= Canada–United States relations =

- Canada: United States

Diplomatic mission
- Embassy of Canada, Washington, D.C.: Embassy of the United States, Ottawa

Envoy
- Canadian Ambassador to the United States Mark Wiseman: American Ambassador to Canada Pete Hoekstra

Canada and the United States have had a long and complex relationship that has had a significant impact on each other's history, economy, and culture. The two countries have historically considered themselves among the "closest allies". They share the longest border (8,891 km, 5,525 mi) between any two sovereign states, and are one of the largest bilateral trading partnerships in the world. Americans rank Canada as one of their respective most favoured nations and historically, a majority of Canadians have held mostly favorable views of the United States. Despite both countries continuing to be close security and strategic partners, political and economic relations rapidly deteriorated during President Donald Trump's second term due to the 2025 U.S. trade war with Canada and U.S. annexation threats towards Canada, with 2025 surveys showing increased and unprecedented distrust and negative views of the United States government by Canadians.

Since the end of World War II, the economies and supply chains of both countries had grown to be increasingly integrated. In 2024, every day, around 328,000 people and $3.6 billion (US$2.6 billion) in goods and services crossed the Canada–U.S. border resulting in around $1.3 Trillion annually. The close economic partnership was facilitated by shared economic interests and previously strong bilateral trade agreements. The North American Free Trade Agreement (NAFTA) and its successor, the United States–Mexico–Canada Agreement (USMCA), have played a pivotal role in fostering economic cooperation and integration between the two nations. Cross-border projects, such as communications, highways, bridges, and pipelines, have led to shared energy networks and transportation systems. The countries have established joint inspection agencies, share data, and led to harmonised regulations on food and manufactured goods. Despite these facts, increasingly recurring and amplifying disputes have included trade disagreements, environmental concerns, uncertainty over oil exports, illegal immigration, terrorism threats, and illicit drug trafficking. A trade disputes over softwood lumber has existed for decades resulting in one of the largest and most enduring trade disputes between the two nations.

Military collaboration was close during World War II and continued throughout the Cold War, bilaterally through NORAD and multilaterally through NATO. However, Canada has long refused to participate in U.S. military operations that are not sanctioned by the United Nations, such as the Vietnam War, the 2003 invasion of Iraq and 2026 Iran war. Canadian peacekeeping is a distinguishing feature that Canadians feel sets their military foreign policy apart from the United States.

Canadian anti-Americanism and American anti-Canadianism have manifested themselves in a variety of ways, ranging from political to cultural due to the asymmetric nature of the relationship. Defining themselves as "not Americans" has been a recurring theme in Canadian identity. Starting with the American Revolution, when Loyalists were resettled in Nova Scotia and Quebec (in present day Canada) between 1782-83 a vocal element in Canada has warned against American dominance or annexation. The War of 1812 saw another attempt by the United States to conquer Canada, and invasions across the border in both directions, however, the war ended with unchanged borders. The British stopped aiding Indigenous attacks on the United States, and the United States never again attempted to invade Canada. As Britain decided to disengage, fears of an American takeover played a role in the Canadian Confederation (1867).

== Country comparison ==
	Canada	United States of America
Flag	Canada	United States
Population	41,651,653	342,726,000
Area	9,984,670 km^{2} (3,855,100 mi^{2})	9,833,520 km^{2} (3,796,740 mi^{2})
Population Density	4.2/km^{2} (11/sq mi)	34.7/km^{2} (90/sq mi)
Capital	Ottawa	Washington, D.C.
Largest City	Toronto – 2,794,356 (6,202,225 Metro)	New York City – 8,600,710 (19,006,798 Metro)
Government	Federal parliamentary constitutional monarchy	Federal presidential constitutional republic
First Leader	Victoria (Monarch); John A. Macdonald (Prime Minister)	George Washington
Current Leaders	Charles III (Monarch); Mark Carney (Prime Minister)	Donald Trump
Official languages	English and French	English
GDP (PPP)	US$2.723 trillion; $65,500 per capita	US$30.616 trillion; $89,599 per capita

== History ==
=== Colonial wars ===
Map of European colonies in North America, c. 1750. Territorial claims by European powers were fought over during the French and Indian Wars.

Before the British conquest of French Canada in 1760, there had been a series of wars between the British and the French that were fought out in the colonies as well as in Europe and on the high seas. In general, the British heavily relied on American colonial militia units, while the French heavily relied on their First Nation allies. The Iroquois Nation were important British allies. Much of the fighting involved ambushes and small-scale warfare in the villages along the border between New England and Quebec. The New England colonies had a much larger population than Quebec, so major invasions came from south to north. The tension along the border was exacerbated by religion, as the French Catholics and English Protestants had a deep mutual distrust. There was a naval dimension as well, involving privateers attacking enemy merchant ships.

England seized Quebec from 1629 to 1632, and Acadia in 1613 and again from 1654 to 1670; These territories were returned to France by the peace treaties. The major wars were (to use American names), King William's War (1689–1697); Queen Anne's War (1702–1713); King George's War (1744–1748), and from 1755 to 1763 the French and Indian War (known in Europe as the Seven Years’ War).

New England soldiers and sailors were critical to the successful British campaign to capture the French fortress of Louisbourg in 1745, and (after it had been returned by treaty) to capture it again in 1758.

=== American Revolutionary War ===
The United Empire Loyalist flag, which is very similar to the Union Jack, was used by immigrants who remained loyal to the British crown during the American Revolutionary War. In present-day Canada, the United Empire Loyalist flag continues to be used as a symbol of pride and heritage for loyalist townships and organizations.

At the outset of the American Revolutionary War, the American revolutionaries hoped the French Canadians in Quebec and the Colonists in Nova Scotia would join their rebellion. They were pre-approved for joining the United States in the Articles of Confederation. When northeastern Quebec was invaded, thousands joined the American cause and formed regiments that fought during the war; however, most remained neutral, and some joined the British effort. Britain advised the French Canadians that the British Empire already enshrined their rights in the Quebec Act, which the American colonies had viewed as one of the Intolerable Acts. The American invasion was a fiasco, and Britain tightened its grip on its northern possessions; in 1777, a major British invasion of New York led to the surrender of the entire British army at Saratoga, and led France to enter the war as an ally of the U.S. The French Canadians largely ignored France's appeals for solidarity.

The American forces had much better success in southwestern Quebec, owing to the leadership of Virginia militia leader George Rogers Clark. In 1778, 200 men under Clark, supplied and supported mainly by Virginia, came down the Ohio River near Louisville, Kentucky, marched across southern Illinois, and then captured Kaskaskia without loss of life. From there, part of his men took Vincennes, but was soon lost to British Lieutenant Colonel Henry Hamilton, the commander at Fort Detroit. Clark later retook it in the Siege of Fort Vincennes in February 1779. Roughly half of Clark's militia in the theater were Canadian volunteers sympathetic to the American cause.

In the end, America won its independence, and the Treaty of Paris compelled Britain to cede parts of southwestern Canada to them. Following America's independence, Canada became a refuge for about an estimated 70,000 or 15% of Loyalists who either wanted to leave the U.S. or were compelled by Patriot reprisals to do so. Among the original Loyalists, there were 3,500 free African Americans. Most went to Nova Scotia, and in 1792, 1,200 migrated to Sierra Leone. About 2,000 black slaves were brought in by Loyalist owners; they remained slaves in Canada until the Empire abolished slavery in 1833. Around 85% of the loyalists remained in the new United States and became American citizens.

=== War of 1812 (1812–1815) ===
The Treaty of Paris of 1783, which ended the American Revolutionary War, called for British forces to vacate all their forts south of the Great Lakes border. Britain refused to do so, citing the failure of the newly independent United States to provide financial restitution for Loyalists who had lost property in the war. The Jay Treaty in 1795 with Great Britain resolved that lingering issue, and the British departed the forts. Thomas Jefferson saw the nearby British presence as a threat to the United States, and so he opposed the Jay Treaty, and which became one of the major political issues in the United States at the time. Thousands of Americans immigrated to Upper Canada (Ontario) from 1785 to 1812 to obtain cheaper land and better tax rates prevalent in that province; despite expectations that they would be loyal to the U.S. if a war broke out, in the event they were largely non-political.

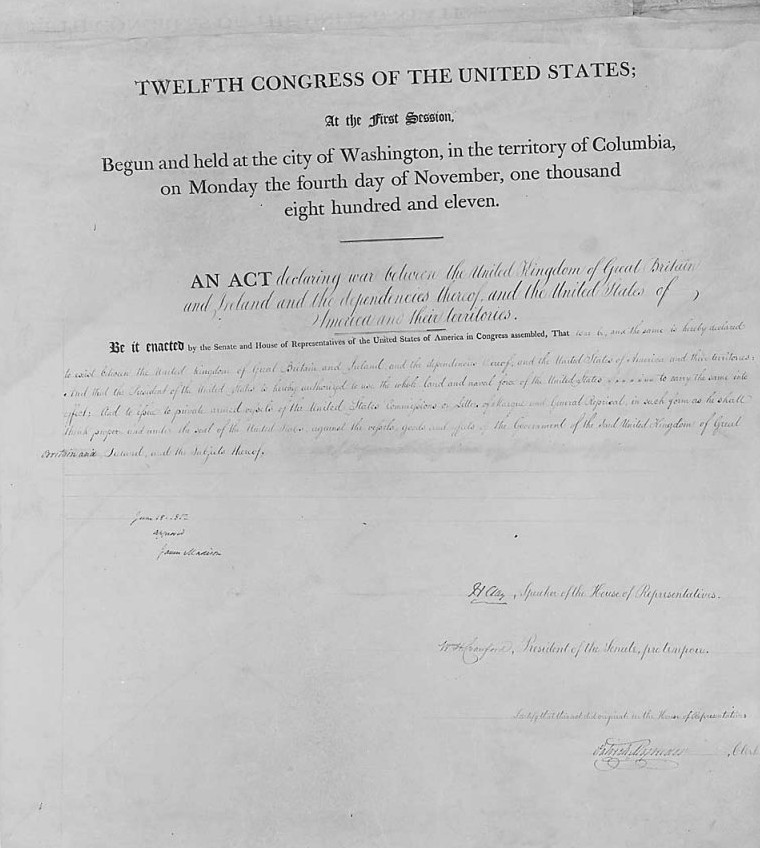
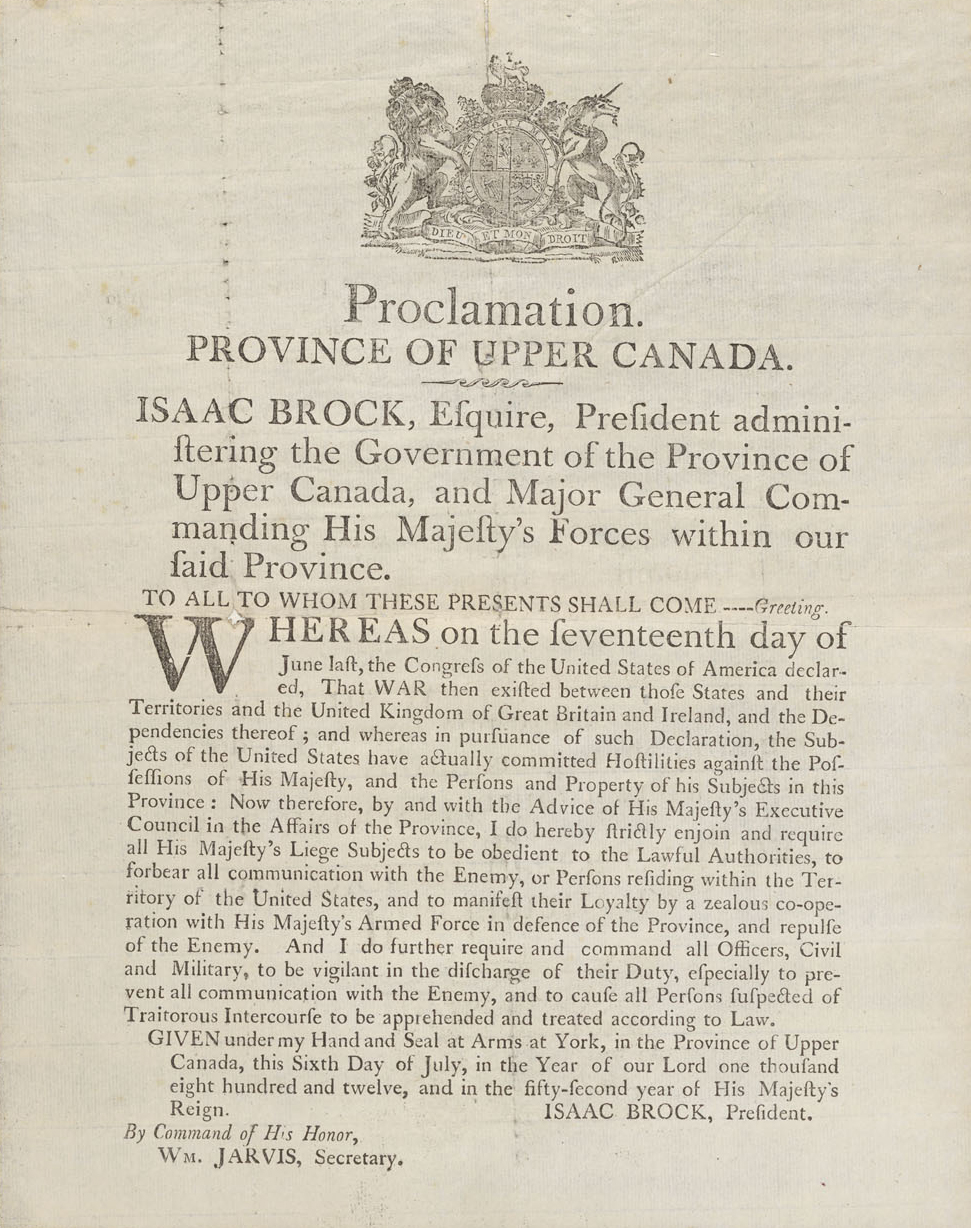
The United States Declaration of War against the British (left) and Governor Issac Brock's proclamation issued in response to it in the Province of Upper Canada (right)

Tensions mounted again after 1805, erupting into the War of 1812 (1812–1815), when the United States Congress, approved/signed by the fourth President James Madison (1751–1836, served 1809–1817), declared war in June 1812 on Britain. The Americans were angered by British harassment of U.S. ships on the high seas and seizure of 6,000 sailors from American ships, severe restrictions against neutral American trade with France, and British support for hostile Native American tribes in Ohio and territories the U.S. had gained in 1783. American "honor" was an implicit issue. While the Americans could not hope to defeat the Royal Navy and control the seas, they could call on an army much larger than the British garrison in Canada, and so a land invasion of Canada was proposed as the most advantageous means of attacking the British Empire. Americans on the western frontier also hoped an invasion would bring an end to British support of Native American resistance to American expansion, typified by Tecumseh's coalition of tribes. Americans may also have wanted to acquire Canada.

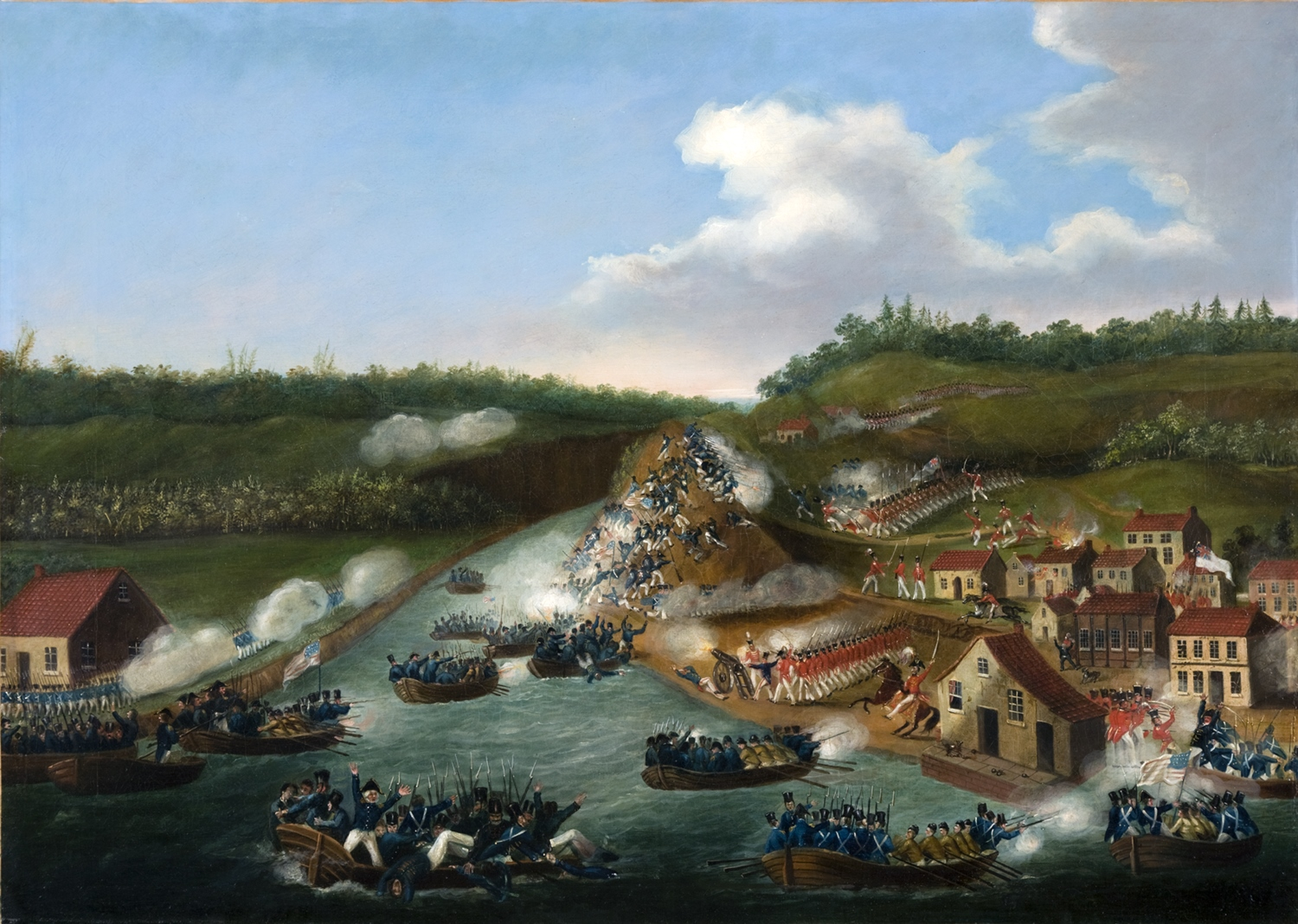
The Battle of Queenston Heights by eyewitness James B. Dennis, depicts the American landing on October 13, 1812

Once war broke out, the American strategy was to seize Canada. There was some hope that settlers in western Canada—most of them recent immigrants from the U.S.—would welcome the chance to overthrow their British rulers. However, the American invasions were defeated primarily by British regulars with support from Native Americans and Upper Canada militia. Aided by the large Royal Navy, a series of British raids on the American coast were highly successful, culminating with an attack on Washington that resulted in the British burning of the White House, the Capitol, and other public buildings. At the end of the war, Britain's American Indian allies had largely been defeated, and the Americans controlled a strip of Western Ontario centered on Fort Malden. However, Britain held much of Maine, and, with the support of their remaining American Indian allies, huge areas of the Old Northwest, including Wisconsin and much of Michigan and Illinois. With the surrender of Napoleon in 1814, Britain ended naval policies that angered Americans; with the defeat of the Indian tribes, the threat to American expansion was ended. The upshot was that both the United States and Canada asserted their sovereignty, Canada remained under British rule, and London and Washington had nothing more to fight over. The war was ended by the Treaty of Ghent, which took effect in February 1815. A series of postwar agreements further stabilized peaceful relations along the Canada–US border. Canada reduced American immigration for fear of undue American influence and built up the Anglican Church of Canada as a counterweight to the largely American Baptist and Methodist churches.

In later years, Anglophone Canadians, especially in Ontario, viewed the War of 1812 as a heroic and successful resistance against invasion and as a victory that defined them as a people. The myth that the Canadian militia had defeated the invasion almost single-handed, known logically as the "militia myth", became highly prevalent after the war, having been propounded by John Strachan, Anglican Bishop of York.

=== Post War of 1812 and mid-19th century ===
In the aftermath of the War of 1812, pro-British conservatives led by Anglican Bishop John Strachan took control in Ontario ("Upper Canada") and promoted the Anglican religion as opposed to the more republican Methodist and Baptist churches. A small interlocking elite, known as the Family Compact, took full political control. Democracy, as practiced in the United States, was ridiculed. The policies had the desired effect of deterring immigration from the United States. Revolts in favor of democracy, supported by America, in Ontario and Quebec ("Lower Canada") in 1837 were suppressed; many of the leaders fled to the US. The American policy was to largely ignore the rebellions, and indeed ignore Canada generally in favor of the westward expansion of the American Frontier.

The 1842 Webster–Ashburton Treaty formalized the U.S.–Canada border in Maine, averting the Aroostook War. During the Manifest Destiny era, the "Fifty-Four Forty or Fight" agenda called for U.S. annexation of what became Western Canada; the U.S. and Britain instead agreed to a boundary of the 49th parallel. As harsher fugitive slave laws were passed, Canada became a destination for slaves escaping on the Underground Railroad.

=== American Civil War ===
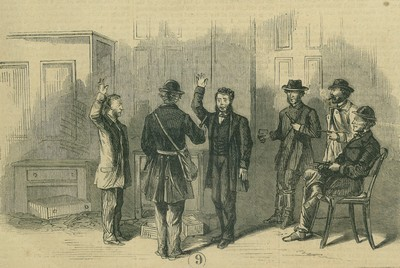
Confederate soldiers force a bank teller to pledge allegiance to the Confederate States of America while conducting the raid at St. Albans, Vermont. The Confederate soldiers launched their raid from the Province of Canada.

The British Empire was neutral during the American Civil War. About 40,000 Canadians volunteered for the Union Army—many already lived in the U.S., and a few for the Confederate Army. However, hundreds of Americans who were called up in the draft fled to Canada. 29 Canadians would receive the Medal of Honor for their actions during the war.

Several events caused strained relations between the British Empire and the United States, over the former's unofficial role in supporting the Confederacy. Blockade runners loaded with arms came from Great Britain and made use of Canadian ports in the Maritimes to break through the Union blockade to deliver the weaponry to the Confederacy in exchange for cotton. Attacks were made on American merchant shipping by British-built Confederate warships such as CSS Alabama. On December 7, 1863, pro-Confederate Canadian sympathizers hijacked an American steamer and killed a crew member off the coast of Cape Cod, Massachusetts, and then used the steamer, originally intended as a blockade runner, to flee back to the Maritimes where they were later able to escape justice for murder and piracy. Confederate Secret Service agents also used Canada as a base to attack American border towns, such as St. Albans, Vermont, on October 19, 1864, where they killed an American citizen, robbed three banks of over US$200,000, then escaped to Canada, where they were arrested but then released by a Canadian court to widespread American anger. Many Americans falsely suspected that the Canadian government knew of the raid ahead of time. American Secretary of State William H. Seward let the British government know that "it is impossible to consider those proceedings as either legal, just or friendly towards the United States."

==== Alabama claims ====
Americans were angry at Britain's perceived support for the Confederacy during the American Civil War. Some leaders demanded a huge payment, on the premise that British involvement had lengthened the war by two years, a claim confirmed by post-Civil War historians and scholars. Senator Charles Sumner, the chairman of the Senate Foreign Relations Committee, originally wanted to ask for $2 billion in war reparations, or alternatively the ceding of all of Canada to the United States.

When American Secretary of State William H. Seward negotiated the Alaska Purchase with Russia in 1867, he intended it as the first step in a comprehensive plan to gain control of the entire northwest Pacific Coast. Seward was a firm believer in Manifest Destiny, primarily for its commercial advantages to the U.S. Seward expected British Columbia to seek annexation to the U.S. and thought Britain might accept this in exchange for the Alabama claims. Soon, other elements endorsed annexation; they planned to annex British Columbia, Red River Colony (Manitoba), and Nova Scotia, in exchange for dropping the damage claims. The idea peaked in the spring and summer of 1870, with American expansionists, Canadian separatists, and pro-American Englishmen seemingly combining forces. The plan was dropped for multiple reasons. London continued to stall, American commercial and financial groups pressed Washington for a quick settlement of the dispute on a cash basis, growing Canadian nationalist sentiment in British Columbia called for staying inside the British Empire, Congress became preoccupied with Reconstruction, and most Americans showed little interest in territorial expansion.

The "Alabama Claims" dispute went to international arbitration. In one of the first major cases of arbitration, the tribunal in 1872 rejected the American claims for damages relating to the British blockade running but ordered Britain to pay $15.5 million only for damages caused by British-built Confederate ships. Britain paid, and the episode ended in peaceful relations.

=== Late 19th century ===
Canada became a self-governing dominion in 1867 in internal affairs, while Britain retained control of diplomacy and defence policy. Before Confederation, there was an Oregon boundary dispute in which the Americans claimed the 54th degree latitude. The Oregon Treaty of 1846 largely resolved the issue, splitting the disputed territory along the 49th parallel – the northern half became British Columbia, and the southern half eventually formed the states of Washington and Oregon.

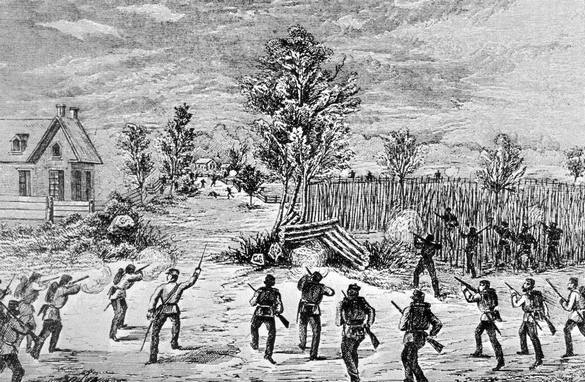
The Battle of Eccles Hill in 1870. The American-based Fenian Brotherhood launched several raids into Canada in 1866 and 1870–71.

Strained relations with America continued, however, due to a series of small-scale armed incursions called the "Fenian raids" conducted by Irish-American Civil War veterans across the border from 1866 to 1871 in an attempt to trade Canada for Irish independence. The American government, angry at Canadian tolerance of Confederate raiders during the American Civil War of 1861 to 1865, moved very slowly to disarm the Fenians. The Fenian raids were small-scale attacks carried out by the Fenian Brotherhood, an Irish Republican organization based among Irish Catholics in the United States. Targets included British Army forts, customs posts, and other locations near the border. The raids were small, unsuccessful episodes in 1866 and again from 1870 to 1871. They aimed to bring pressure on Great Britain to withdraw from Ireland. None of these raids achieved their aims, and all were quickly defeated by local Canadian forces.

The British government, in charge of diplomatic relations, protested cautiously, as Anglo-American relations were tense. Much of the tension was relieved as the Fenians faded away, and in 1872 by the settlement of the Alabama Claims, when Britain paid the U.S. $15.5 million for war losses caused by warships built in Britain and sold to the Confederacy.

After 1874, relations between Canada and the United States were largely amicable. Disputes over ocean boundaries on Georges Bank and fishing, whaling, and sealing rights in the Pacific were settled by international arbitration, setting an important international precedent. Longstanding minor boundary disputes regarding Alaska were made critical by the Klondike Gold Rush in the Yukon portion of Canada, most easily reached through Alaska. In the Atlantic Ocean, the question of fishing rights led to long discussions among Canada, the United States, and Newfoundland.

Both sides raised tariffs on products imported from the other. Canada reversed earlier free trade policies, introducing protective tariffs under its National Policy starting in 1879 to promote industrialization. Hopes for renewed reciprocity agreements to lower the tariff faded away. In the McKinley Tariff of 1890, the U.S. imposed higher duties on imports from Canada, which led to a backlash and the rejection of half-hearted proposals for a political union by which the U.S. would annex Canada. The U.S. economy was growing much faster than the UK economy, and the results were a shift toward more Canadian trade with the U.S. and less with Britain. In 1880, the U.S. supplied 40% of Canada's imports; by 1900, this had risen to 60%. The U.S. also became a major market for Canadian exports, especially raw materials. By 1900, the U.S. absorbed 45% of Canada's exports, up from 32% in 1870. Increased trade was facilitated by expanding rail links and the complementary nature of the two economies: U.S. manufactured goods flowed north, while Canadian raw materials and foodstuffs moved south.

=== Early 20th century ===
==== Alaska boundary ====
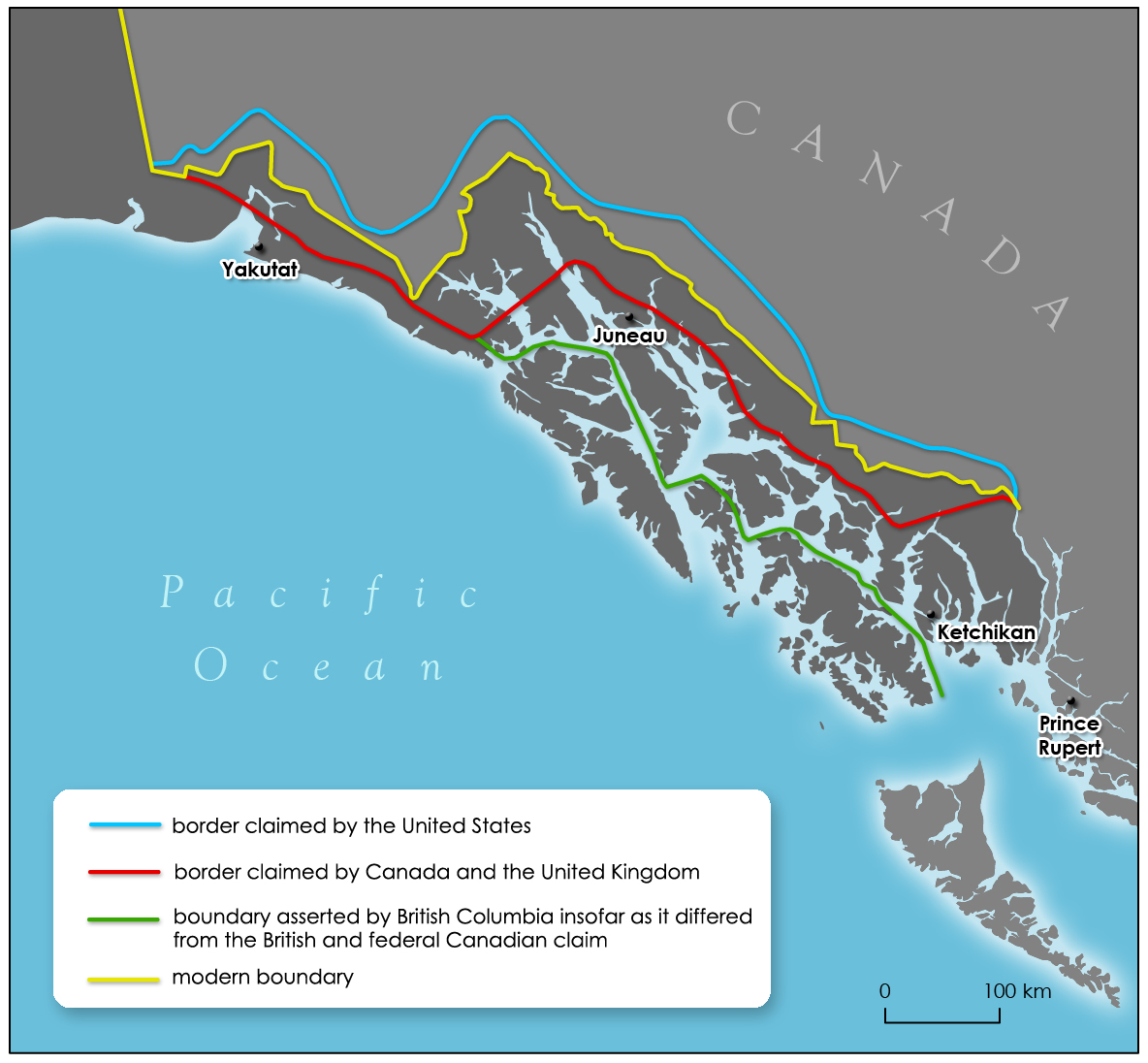
Border claims made during the Alaska boundary dispute. The border dispute was settled by arbitration in 1903, with the modern boundary marked by a yellow line.

A short-lived controversy was the Alaska boundary dispute, settled in favor of the United States in 1903. The issue was unimportant until the Klondike Gold Rush brought tens of thousands of men to Canada's Yukon, and they had to arrive through American ports. Canada needed its port and claimed that it had a legal right to a port near the present American town of Haines, Alaska. It would provide an all-Canadian route to the rich goldfields. The dispute was settled by arbitration, and the British delegate voted with the Americans—to the astonishment and disgust of Canadians who suddenly realized that Britain considered its relations with the United States paramount compared to those with Canada. The arbitration validated the status quo, but made Canada angry at London.

1907 saw a minor controversy over USS Nashville sailing into the Great Lakes via Canada without Canadian permission. To head off future embarrassments, in 1909, the two sides signed the International Boundary Waters Treaty, and the International Joint Commission was established to manage the Great Lakes and keep them disarmed. It was amended in World War II to allow the building and training of warships.

==== Free trade rejected ====
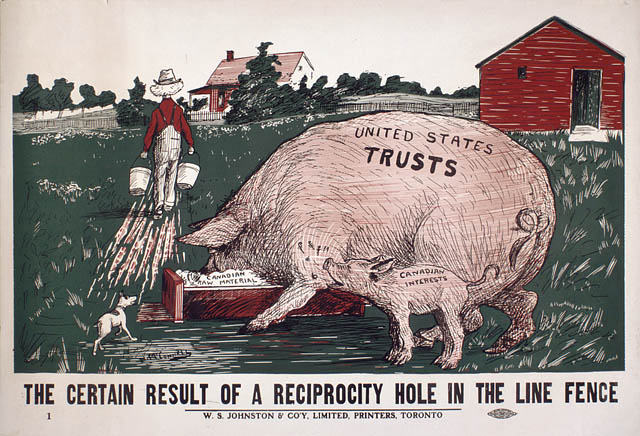
A 1911 Conservative campaign poster warns that the big American companies ("trusts") will hog all the benefits of reciprocity as proposed by Liberals, leaving little left over for Canadian interests

Anti-Americanism reached a shrill peak in 1911 in Canada. The Liberal government in 1911 negotiated a Reciprocity treaty with the U.S. that would lower trade barriers. Canadian manufacturing interests were alarmed that free trade would allow the bigger and more efficient American factories to take their markets. The Conservatives made it a central campaign issue in the 1911 election, warning that it would be a "sell-out" to the United States, with economic annexation a special danger. The Conservative slogan was "No truck or trade with the Yankees", as they appealed to Canadian nationalism and nostalgia for the British Empire to win a major victory.

==== World War I ====
British Canadians were annoyed during a brief period from 1914 to 1916, when the United States insisted on neutrality and seemed to profit heavily, while Canada was sacrificing its wealth and its youth. However, when the U.S. finally declared war on Germany in April 1917, there was swift cooperation and friendly coordination, as one historian reports:

Official co-operation between Canada and the United States—the pooling of grain, fuel, power, and transportation resources, the underwriting of a Canadian loan by bankers of New York—produced a good effect on the public mind. Canadian recruiting detachments were welcomed in the United States, while a reciprocal agreement was ratified to facilitate the return of draft evaders. A Canadian War Mission was established at Washington, and in many other ways, the activities of the two countries were coordinated for efficiency. Immigration regulations were relaxed, and thousands of American farmhands crossed the border to assist in harvesting Canadian crops. Officially and publicly, at least, the two nations were on better terms than ever before in their history, and on the American side, this attitude extended through almost all classes of society.

==== Post-World War I ====
Canada demanded and received permission from London to send its delegation to the Versailles Peace Talks in 1919, with the proviso that it sign the treaty under the British Empire. Throughout the 1920s, Canada began assuming greater responsibility for its own foreign and military affairs. In 1927, the U.S. and Canada exchanged ambassadors for the first time, with Canada appointing Vincent Massey and America William Phillips respectively. The postwar era saw the United States pursue isolationism while Canada became an active member of the British Commonwealth, the League of Nations, and the World Court.

In July 1923, as part of his Pacific Northwest tour and a week before his death, U.S. president Warren Harding visited Vancouver, making him the first American head of state to visit confederated Canada. The then Premier of British Columbia, John Oliver, and then mayor of Vancouver, Charles Tisdall, hosted a lunch in his honor at the Hotel Vancouver. Over 50,000 people heard Harding speak in Stanley Park. A monument to Harding, designed by Charles Marega, was unveiled in Stanley Park in 1925.

Relations with the United States remained cordial until 1930, when Canada vehemently protested the new Smoot–Hawley Tariff Act by which the U.S. raised tariffs on products imported from Canada. Canada retaliated with higher tariffs of its own against American products and moved toward more trade within the British Commonwealth. U.S.–Canadian trade fell 75% as the Great Depression dragged both countries down.

During the 1920s, the war and naval departments of both nations designed war game scenarios with the other as an enemy as part of routine training exercises. In 1921, Canada developed Defence Scheme No. 1 for an attack on American cities and for forestalling an invasion by the United States until British reinforcements could arrive. Throughout the later 1920s and 1930s, the United States Army War College developed a plan for a war with the British Empire waged largely on North American territory: War Plan Red.

Herbert Hoover's meeting in 1927 with British Ambassador Sir Esme Howard agreed on the "absurdity of contemplating the possibility of war between the United States and the British Empire".

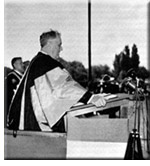
Franklin D. Roosevelt speaking at Queen's University at Kingston. Roosevelt spoke on the U.S. relations with Canada while there.

In 1938, as the roots of World War II were set in motion, U.S. president Franklin Roosevelt gave a public speech at Queen's University in Kingston, Ontario, declaring that the United States would not sit idly by if another power tried to dominate Canada. Diplomats saw it as a clear warning to Germany not to attack Canada. Other diplomats feared it would lead to an American takeover of Canada.

=== World War II ===
The two nations cooperated closely in World War II, as both nations saw new levels of prosperity and a determination to defeat the Axis powers. Prime Minister William Lyon Mackenzie King and President Franklin D. Roosevelt were determined not to repeat the mistakes of their predecessors. They met in August 1940 at Ogdensburg, issuing a declaration calling for close cooperation, and formed the Permanent Joint Board on Defense (PJBD).

King sought to raise Canada's international visibility by hosting the August 1943 Quadrant conference in Quebec on military and political strategy; he was a gracious host but was kept out of the important meetings by Winston Churchill and Roosevelt.

Canada allowed the construction of the Alaska Highway and participated in the building of the atomic bomb. 49,000 Americans joined the RCAF (Canadian) or RAF (British) air forces through the Clayton Knight Committee, which had Roosevelt's permission to recruit in the U.S. in 1940–42.

American attempts in the mid-1930s to integrate British Columbia into a united West Coast military command had aroused Canadian opposition. Fearing a Japanese invasion of Canada's vulnerable British Columbia Coast, American officials urged the creation of a united military command for an eastern Pacific Ocean theater of war. Canadian leaders feared American imperialism and the loss of autonomy more than a Japanese invasion. In 1941, Canadians successfully argued within the PJBD for cooperation rather than a unified command for the West Coast.

==== Newfoundland ====
The United States built large military bases in Newfoundland during World War II. At the time, it was a British crown colony, having lost dominion status. The American spending ended the depression and brought new prosperity; Newfoundland's business community sought closer ties with the United States, as expressed by the Economic Union Party. Ottawa took notice and wanted Newfoundland to join Canada, which it did after hotly contested referendums. There was little demand in the United States for the acquisition of Newfoundland, so the United States did not protest the British decision not to allow an American option on the Newfoundland referendum.

=== Cold War ===
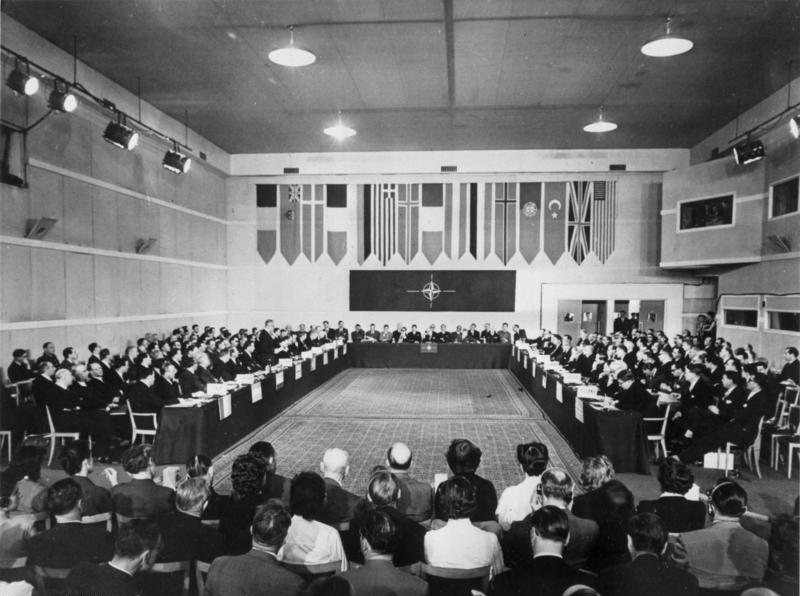
A NATO summit in Paris, May 1955. Both Canada and the United States are founding members of the military alliance.

Prime Minister William Lyon Mackenzie King, working closely with his Foreign Minister Louis St. Laurent, handled foreign relations 1945–48 cautiously. Canada donated money to the United Kingdom to help it rebuild; was elected to the UN Security Council; and helped design NATO. However, Mackenzie King rejected free trade with the United States, and decided not to play a role in the Berlin airlift. Canada had been actively involved in the League of Nations, primarily because it could act separately from Britain. It played a role in the postwar formation of the United Nations, as well as the International Monetary Fund. It played a somewhat larger role in 1947 in designing the General Agreement on Tariffs and Trade. After the mid-20th century onwards, Canada and the United States became extremely close partners. Canada was a close ally of the United States during the Cold War.

==== Vietnam War resisters ====
While Canada openly accepted draft evaders and later deserters from the United States, there was never a serious international dispute due to Canada's actions, while Sweden's acceptance was heavily criticized by the United States. The issue of accepting American exiles became a local political debate in Canada that focused on Canada's sovereignty in its immigration law. The United States did not become involved because American politicians viewed Canada as a geographically close ally not worth disturbing.

==== Nixon Shock 1971 ====
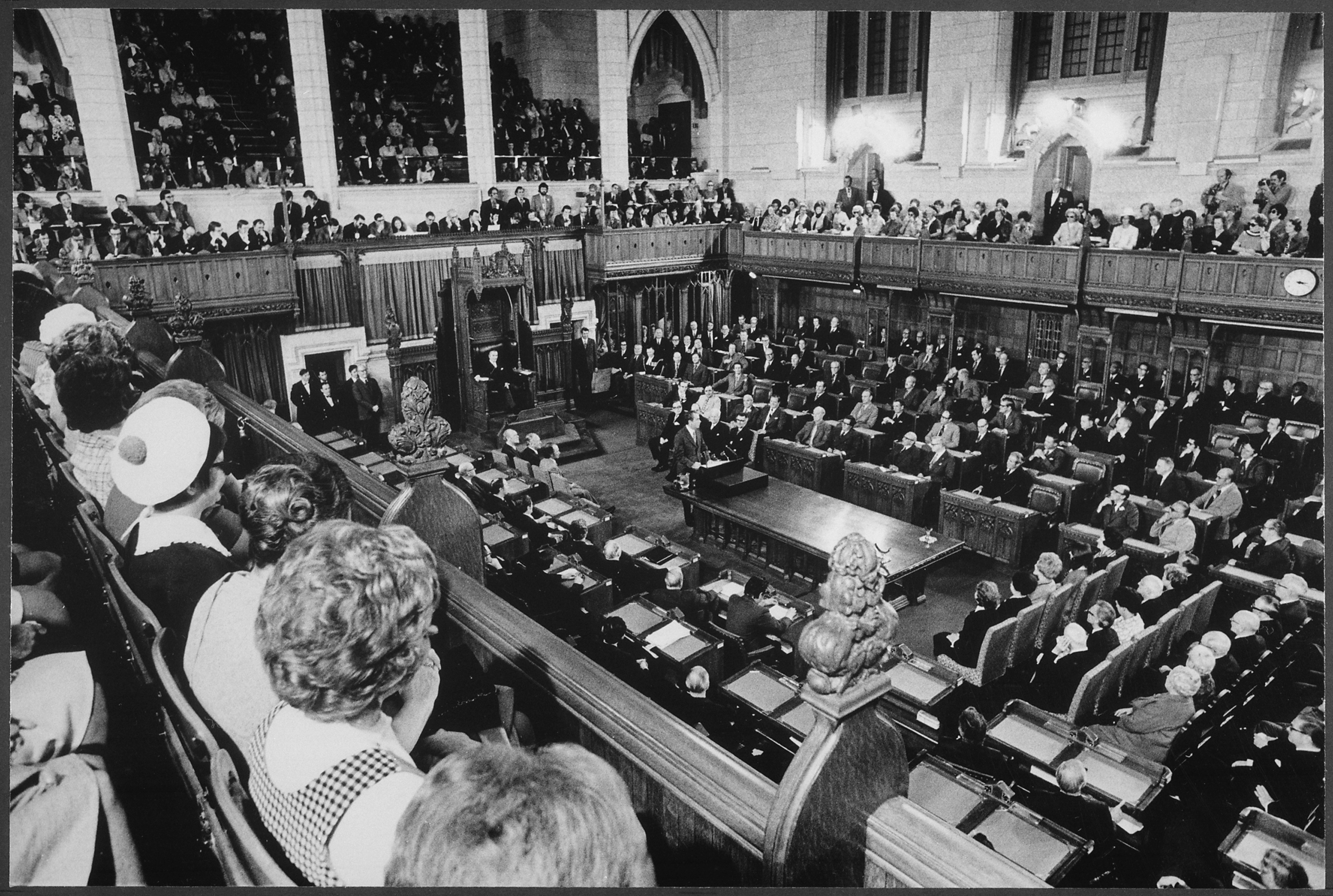
Richard Nixon addresses a joint session of the Parliament of Canada, 1972

The United States had become Canada's largest market, and after the war, the Canadian economy became dependent on smooth trade flows with the United States so much that in 1971, when the United States enacted the "Nixon Shock" economic policies (including a 10% tariff on all imports), it put the Canadian government into a panic. Washington refused to exempt Canada from its 1971 New Economic Policy, so Canadian prime minister Pierre Trudeau saw a solution in closer economic ties with Europe. Trudeau proposed a "Third Option" policy of diversifying Canada's trade and downgrading the importance of the American market. In a 1972 speech in Ottawa, Nixon declared the "special relationship" between Canada and the United States dead.

Relations deteriorated on many points in the Nixon years (1969–74), including trade disputes, defense agreements, energy, fishing, the environment, cultural imperialism, and foreign policy. They changed for the better when Trudeau and Carter found a better rapport. The late 1970s saw a more sympathetic American attitude toward Canadian political and economic needs, the pardoning of draft evaders who had moved to Canada, and the passing of old issues such as the Watergate scandal and the Vietnam War. Canada more than ever welcomed American investments during "the stagflation" that hurt both nations.

=== President Clinton, 1993–2001 ===
Relations with Canada were friendly. The Clinton administration's policy toward Canada was primarily defined by economic integration and cooperation, with a strong emphasis on the North American Free Trade Agreement (NAFTA). The administration continued and expanded upon the close bilateral relationship between the United States and Canada, focusing on trade, economic growth, and regional stability.

The main issues in Canada–US relations in the 1990s focused on the North American Free Trade Agreement, which was signed in 1994. It created a common market that by 2014 was worth $19 trillion, encompassed 470 million people, and had created millions of jobs. Wilson says, "Few dispute that NAFTA has produced large and measurable gains for Canadian consumers, workers, and businesses". However, he adds, "NAFTA has fallen well short of expectations."

==== NAFTA Implementation and Expansion ====
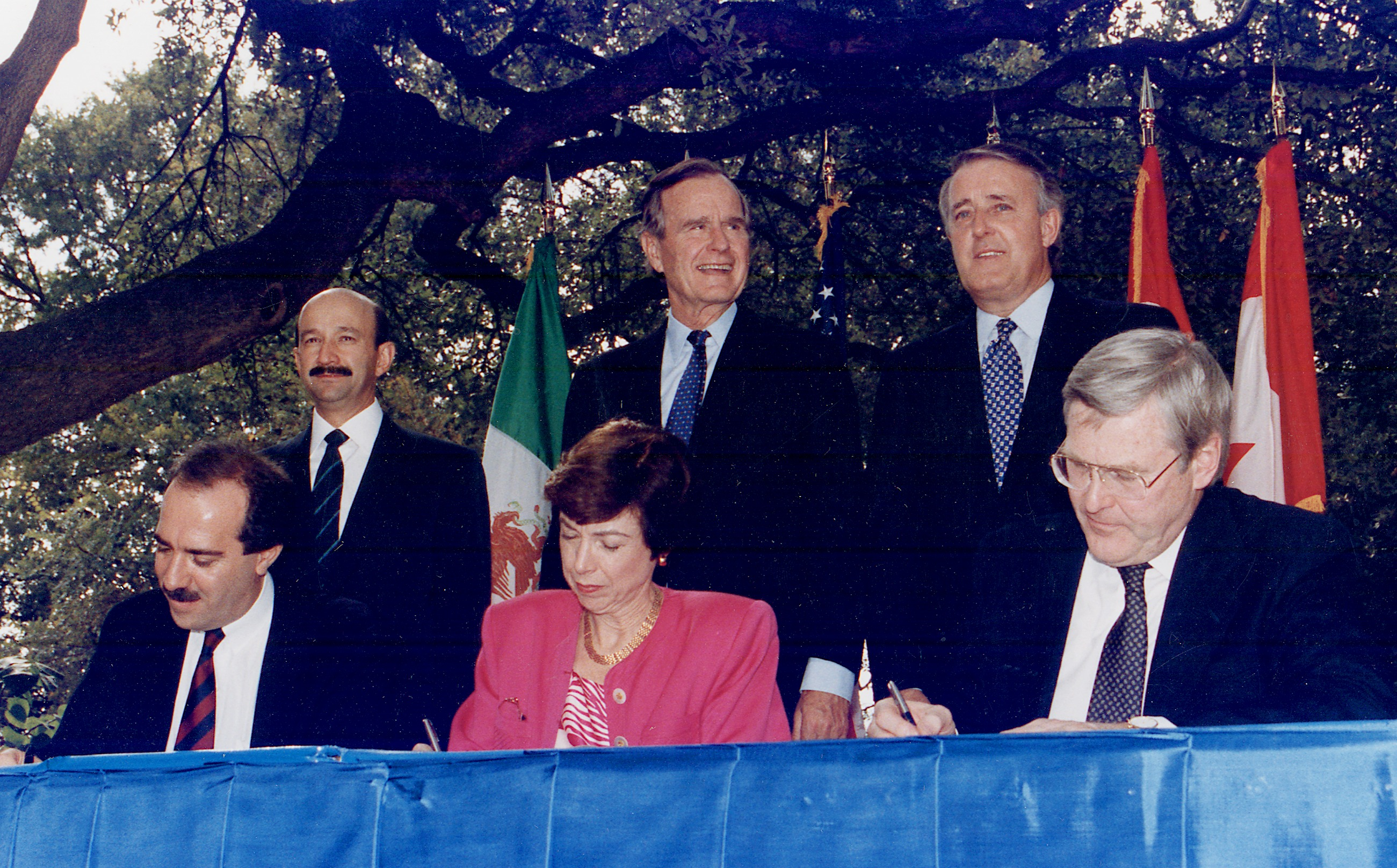
American, Canadian, and Mexican dignitaries initialing the draft North American Free Trade Agreement in October 1992

NAFTA was initially negotiated and signed by Republican president George H. W. Bush in 1992. Liberal opponents tried to block ratification by the U.S. Senate. President Bill Clinton, a Democrat, worked with fellow Democrats to secure its ratification and signed it into law in 1993. NAFTA created a free trade zone among the United States, Canada, and Mexico by eliminating most tariffs and trade restrictions, and included provisions for labor and environmental cooperation. Clinton added supplemental agreements to address labor unions and environmental concerns, making NAFTA the first "green" trade treaty and the first to address labor laws, though with limited enforcement mechanisms.

==== Trade and Economic Growth ====
The administration viewed free trade with Canada as essential for long-term economic prosperity in North America. Clinton argued that NAFTA would increase exports, create jobs, and promote economic growth in all three member countries. The agreement removed barriers in sectors such as agriculture, textiles, and automobiles, and established mechanisms for dispute resolution and intellectual property protection.

While NAFTA was credited with increasing trade and job creation, it also faced criticism from labor unions and environmental groups over job losses and regulatory standards.

==== Bilateral Cooperation ====
Beyond trade, the Clinton administration maintained strong diplomatic and security ties with Canada, consistent with the longstanding partnership between the two countries. There were no major disputes or shifts in the broader relationship during Clinton's tenure, and the administration worked with Canada on issues such as border security and environmental protection. James J. Blanchard, the U.S. ambassador to Canada in 1993–1996, secretly opposed Quebec's separatist movement in the Quebec referendum campaign of October 1995. Blanchard engineered a last-minute statement supporting a united Canada by President Clinton. As a result, five days before the vote, Clinton, in response to a question asked by Canadian reporter Henry Champ, recognized the referendum as an internal issue of Canada. However, he then gave a minute-long statement extolling the virtues of a united Canada, ending with "Canada has been a great model for the rest of the world, and has been a great partner of the United States, and I hope that can continue." While the statement provided relief in sovereignist circles for not being a stronger endorsement of the "No" position, the implication of Clinton, who was popular in Quebec and the leader of the province's most important trading partner, endorsing Canadian unity, had strong reverberations in the electorate.

=== Migration history ===
From the 1750s to the 21st century, there has been an extensive mingling of the Canadian and American populations, with large movements in both directions.

New England Yankee settled large parts of Nova Scotia before 1775 and was neutral during the American Revolution. At the end of the American Revolution, about 75,000 United Empire Loyalistss moved out of the new United States to the eastern Atlantic provinces and south of Quebec. From 1790 to 1812, many farmers moved from New York and New England into Upper Canada (mostly to Niagara, and the north shore of Lake Ontario). In the mid and late 19th century, gold rushes attracted American prospectors, mostly to British Columbia after the Cariboo Gold Rush, Fraser Canyon Gold Rush, and later to the Yukon Territory. In the early 20th century, the opening of land blocks in the Prairie Provinces attracted many farmers from the American Midwest. Many Mennonites immigrated from Pennsylvania and formed their colonies. In the 1890s, some Mormons went north to form communities in Alberta after the Church of Jesus Christ of Latter-day Saints rejected plural marriage. The 1960s saw the arrival of about 50,000 draft dodgers who opposed the Vietnam War.

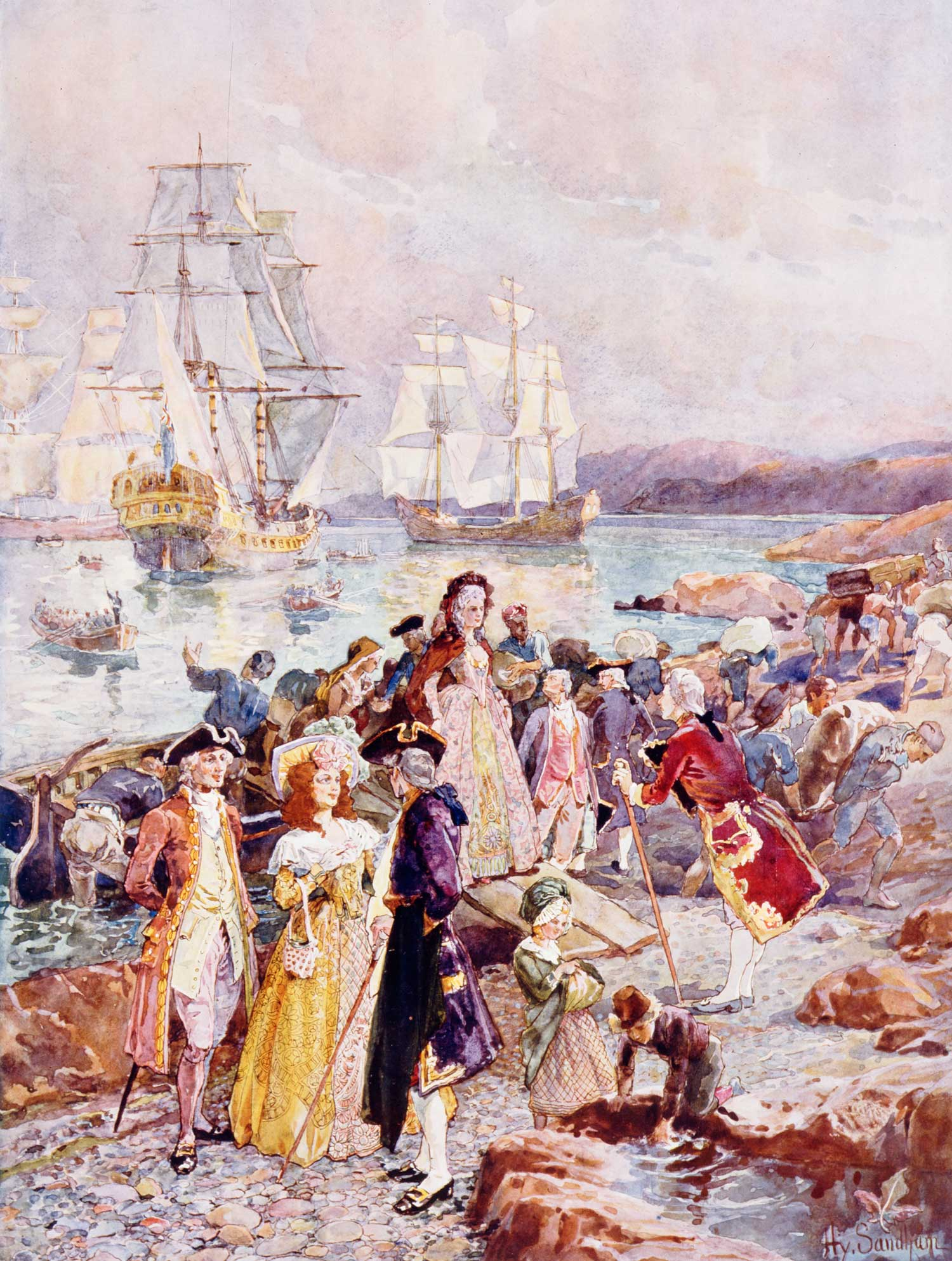
Loyalists landing in present-day New Brunswick. Large movements of population occurred in both directions from the late-18th to the 20th century.

Canada was a way station through which immigrants from other lands stopped for a while, ultimately heading to the U.S. Between 1851 and 1951, 7.1 million people arrived in Canada (mostly from Continental Europe), and 6.6 million left Canada, most of them to the U.S. After 1850, the pace of industrialization and urbanization was much faster in the United States, drawing a wide range of immigrants from the North. By 1870, 1/6 of all the people born in Canada had moved to the United States, with the highest concentrations in New England, which was the destination of Francophone emigrants from Quebec and Anglophone emigrants from the Maritimes. It was common for people to move back and forth across the border, such as seasonal lumberjacks, entrepreneurs looking for larger markets, and families looking for jobs in the textile mills that paid much higher wages than in Canada.

The southward migration slacked off after 1890, as Canadian industry began a growth spurt. By then, the American frontier was closing, and thousands of farmers looking for fresh land moved from the United States north into the Prairie Provinces. The net result of the flows was that in 1901, there were 128,000 American-born residents in Canada (3.5% of the Canadian population) and 1.18 million Canadian-born residents in the United States (1.6% of the U.S. population).

In the late 19th and early 20th centuries, about 900,000 French Canadians moved to the U.S., with 395,000 residents there in 1900. Two-thirds went to mill towns in New England, where they formed distinctive ethnic communities. By the late 20th century, most had abandoned the French language (see New England French), but most kept the Catholic religion. About twice as many English Canadians came to the U.S., but they did not form distinctive ethnic settlements.

== Relations between political executives ==
The executive of each country is represented differently. The President of the United States serves as both the head of state and head of government, and his "administration" is the executive, while the Prime Minister of Canada is head of government only, and his or her "government" or "ministry" directs the executive.

=== W. L. Mackenzie King and Franklin D. Roosevelt (October 1935 – April 1945) ===
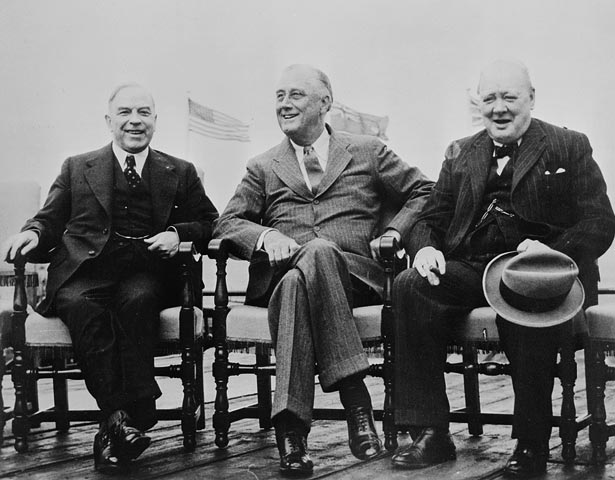
Mackenzie King, Franklin D. Roosevelt, and Winston Churchill at the First Quebec Conference in 1943.

In 1940, W. L. Mackenzie King and Franklin D. Roosevelt signed a defense pact, known as the Ogdensburg Agreement. King hosted conferences for Churchill and Roosevelt, but did not participate in the talks.

=== Louis St. Laurent and Harry S. Truman (November 1948 – January 1953) ===
Prime Minister Laurent and President Truman were both anti-communist during the early years of the Cold War.

=== John G. Diefenbaker and Dwight Eisenhower (June 1957 – January 1961) ===
President Dwight D. Eisenhower (1951–1961) took pains to foster good relations with Progressive Conservative John Diefenbaker (1957–1963). That led to the approval of plans to join in NORAD, an integrated air defense system, in mid-1957. Relations with President John Kennedy were much less cordial. Diefenbaker opposed apartheid in South Africa and helped force that country out of the Commonwealth of Nations. His indecision on whether to accept Bomarc nuclear missiles from the United States led to his government's downfall.

=== John G. Diefenbaker and John F. Kennedy (January 1961 – April 1963) ===
Diefenbaker and President John F. Kennedy did not get along well personally. This was evident in Diefenbaker's response to the Cuban Missile Crisis, where he was slow to support the United States. However, Diefenbaker's Minister of Defence went behind Diefenbaker's back and sent Canada's military to high alert given Canada's legal treaty obligations, to try and appease Kennedy.

=== Lester B. Pearson and Lyndon B. Johnson (November 1963 – April 1968) ===
In 1965, Prime Minister Lester B. Pearson gave a speech in Philadelphia criticizing American involvement in the Vietnam War. This infuriated President Lyndon B. Johnson, who gave him a harsh talk, saying "You don't come here and piss on my rug".

=== Progressive Conservative government (1984–1993) ===
==== Brian Mulroney and Ronald Reagan (September 1984 – January 1989) ====
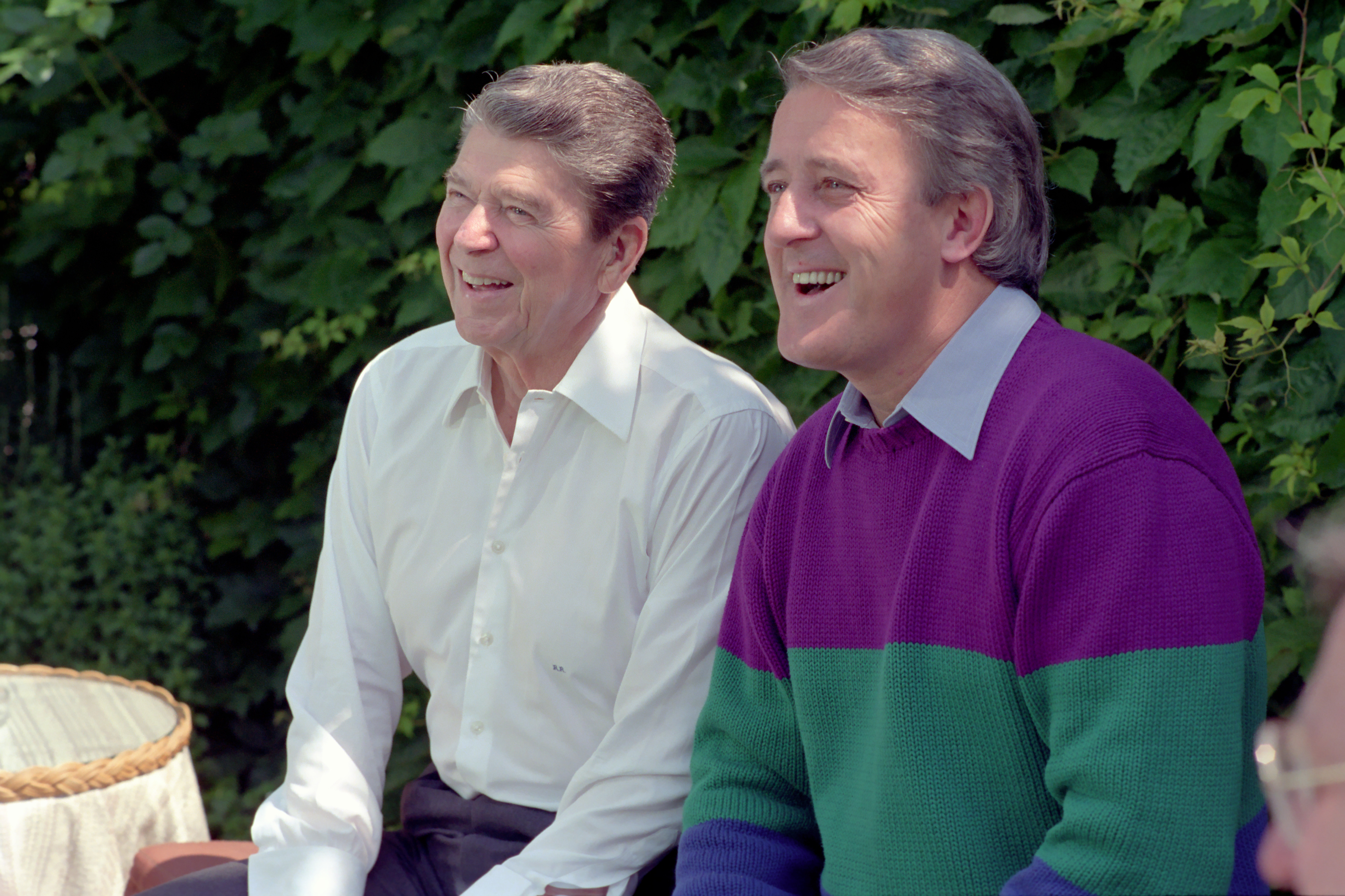
Ronald Reagan (left) and Brian Mulroney in Venice, Italy, June 11, 1987

Relations between Brian Mulroney and Ronald Reagan were famously close. This relationship resulted in negotiations for the Canada–United States Free Trade Agreement, and the U.S.–Canada Air Quality Agreement to reduce acid-rain-causing emissions.

==== Brian Mulroney and George H. W. Bush (January 1989 – January 1993) ====
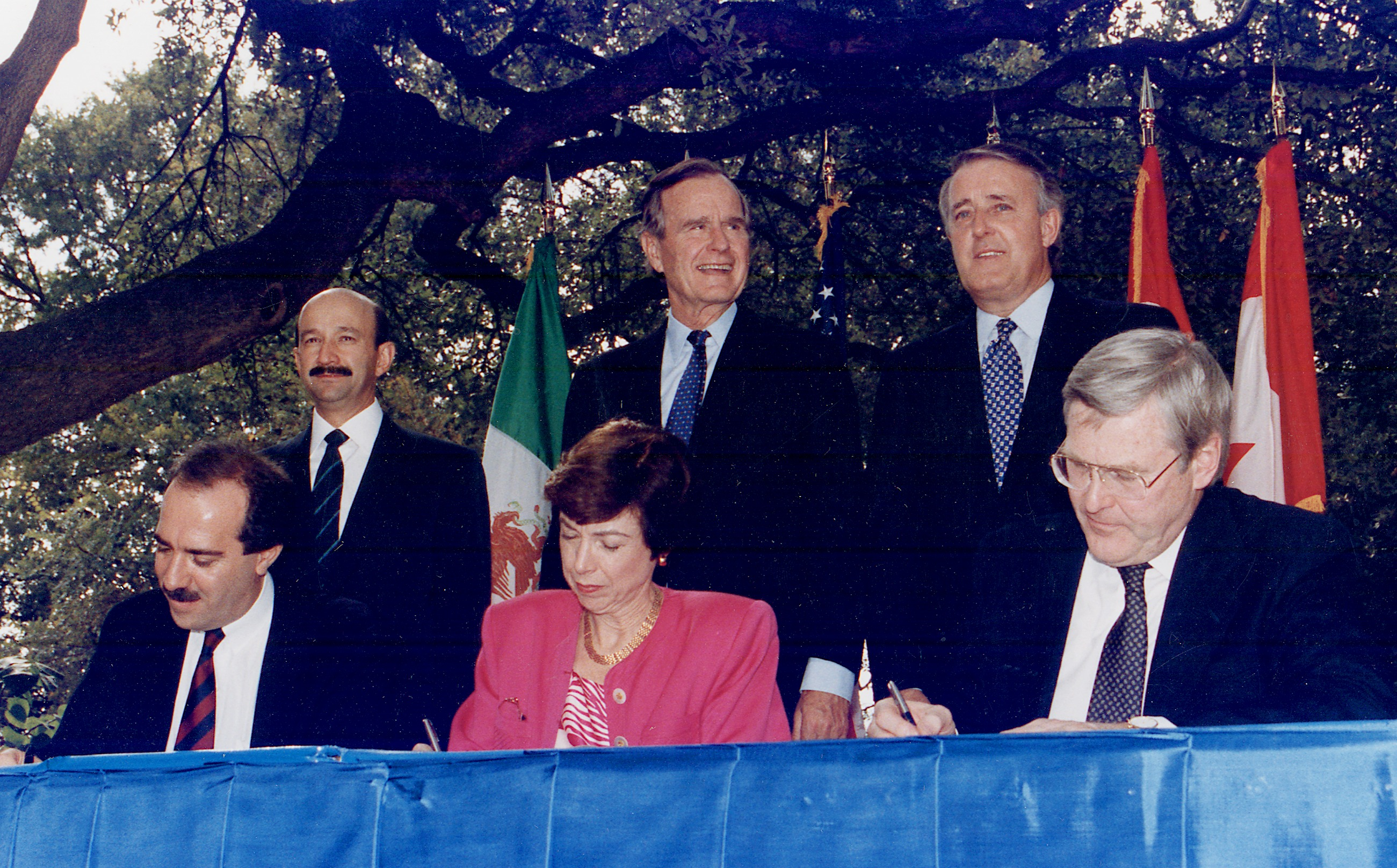
(standing) President Carlos Salinas, President Bush, Prime Minister Brian Mulroney; (seated) Jaime Serra Puche, Carla Hills, and Michael Wilson at the NAFTA Initialing Ceremony, October 1992

The Bush administration and the Progressive Conservative Prime Minister of Canada Brian Mulroney spearheaded the negotiations of the North American Free Trade Agreement (NAFTA). The agreement would eliminate the majority of tariffs on products that were traded among the United States, Canada, and Mexico. This would encourage trade among the countries. The treaty also restricted patents, copyrights, and trademarks, and outlined the removal of investment restrictions among the three countries.

President Bush announced the completion of NAFTA during a Rose Garden appearance on August 12, 1992, calling it the "beginning of a new era".

The agreement came under heavy scrutiny from union-connected Democrats, who charged that NAFTA resulted in a loss of American jobs. NAFTA also contained no provisions for labor rights; according to the Bush administration, the trade agreement would generate economic resources necessary to enable Mexico's government to overcome problems of funding and enforcement of its labor laws. Bush needed a renewal of negotiating authority to move forward with the NAFTA trade talks. Such authority would enable the president to negotiate a trade accord that would be submitted to Congress for a vote, thereby avoiding a situation in which the president would be required to renegotiate with trading partners those parts of an agreement that Congress wished to change. While initial signing was possible during his term, negotiations made slow, but steady, progress. President Clinton would go on to make the passage of NAFTA a priority for his administration, despite its conservative and Republican roots—with the addition of two side agreements—to achieve its passage in 1993.

The treaty has since been defended as well as criticized further. The American economy has grown 54% since the adoption of NAFTA in 1993, with 25 million new jobs created; this was seen by some as evidence of NAFTA being beneficial to the United States. With talk in early 2008 regarding a possible American withdrawal from the treaty, Carlos M. Gutierrez, United States Secretary of Commerce, writes, "Quitting NAFTA would send economic shock waves throughout the world, and the damage would start here at home." But John J. Sweeney, President of the AFL-CIO, wrote in The Boston Globe that "the U.S. trade deficit with Canada and Mexico ballooned to 12 times its pre-NAFTA size, reaching $111 billion in 2004."

Both major policy goals of Mulroney would be finalized under the presidency of George H. W. Bush. Mulroney delivered eulogies at the funerals of both Ronald Reagan in 2004 and George H. W. Bush in 2018.

=== Liberal government (1993–2006) ===
==== Jean Chrétien and Bill Clinton (November 1993 – January 2001) ====
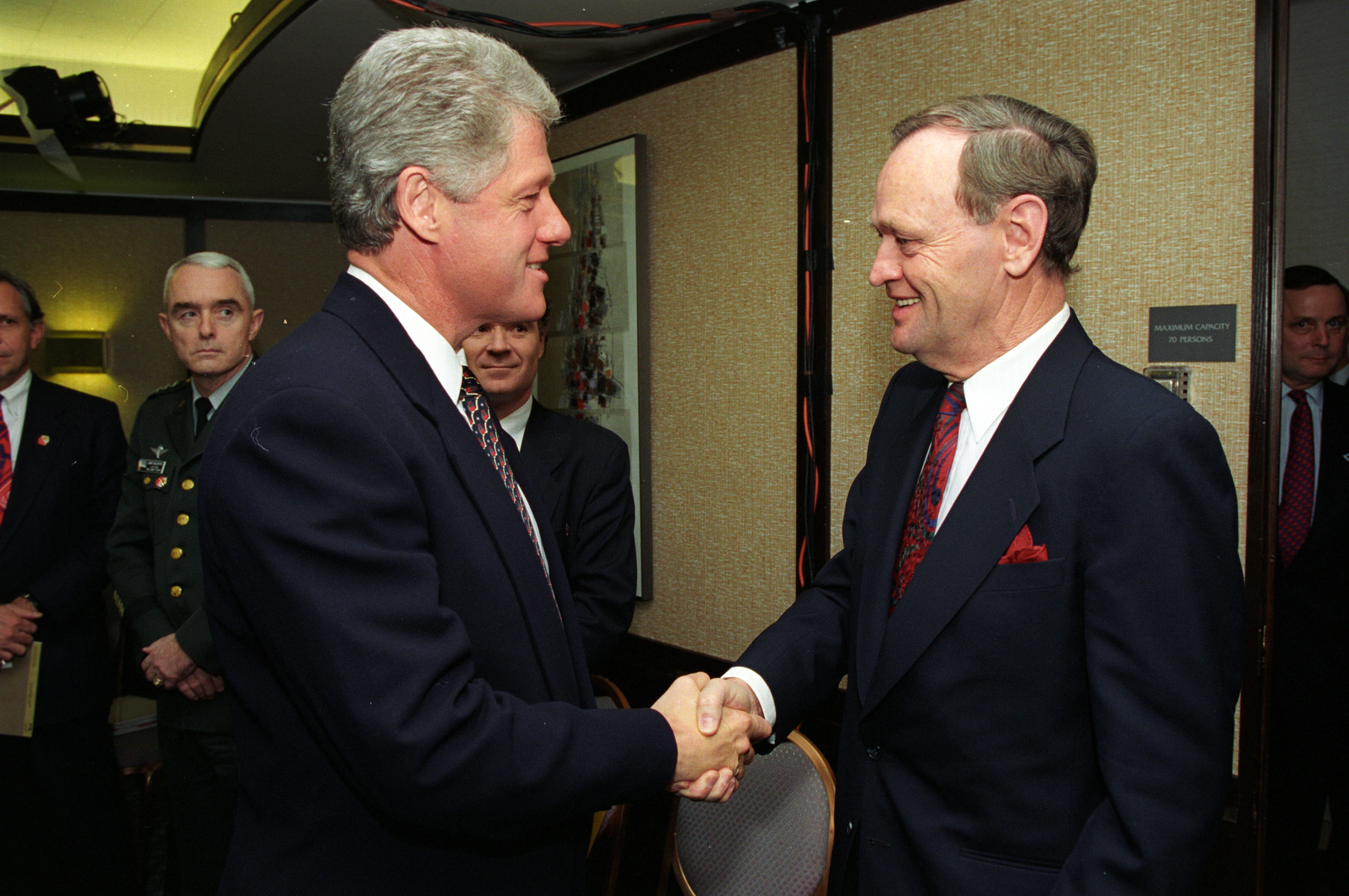
Jean Chrétien shakes hands with Bill Clinton during the APEC summit meeting in November 1993

Although Jean Chrétien was wary of appearing too close to President Bill Clinton, both men had a passion for golf. During a news conference with Prime Minister Chrétien in April 1997, President Clinton quipped, "I don't know if any two world leaders have played golf together more than we have, but we meant to break a record". Their governments had many small trade quarrels over the Canadian content of American magazines, softwood lumber, and so on, but on the whole were quite friendly. Both leaders had run on reforming or abolishing NAFTA, but the agreement went ahead with the addition of environmental and labor side agreements. Crucially, the Clinton administration lent rhetorical support to Canadian unity during the 1995 referendum in Quebec on separation from Canada.

==== Jean Chrétien and George W. Bush (January 2001 – December 2003) ====
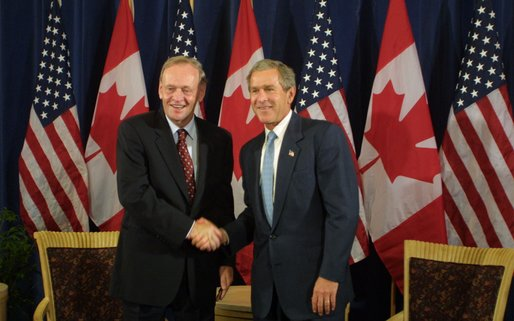
Jean Chrétien shakes hands with George W. Bush during a meeting in September 2002

Relations between Chrétien and George W. Bush were strained throughout their overlapping times in office. Canada offered its full assistance to the U.S. as the September 11 attacks were unfolding. One tangible show of support was Operation Yellow Ribbon, in which more than 200 U.S.-bound flights were diverted to Canada after the U.S. shut down its airspace. Later, however, Chrétien publicly mused that U.S. foreign policy might be part of the "root causes" of terrorism. Some Americans criticized his "smug moralism", and Chrétien's public refusal to support the 2003 Iraq war was met with negative responses in the United States, especially among conservatives.

=== Conservative government (2006–2015) ===
==== Stephen Harper and George W. Bush (February 2006 – January 2009) ====
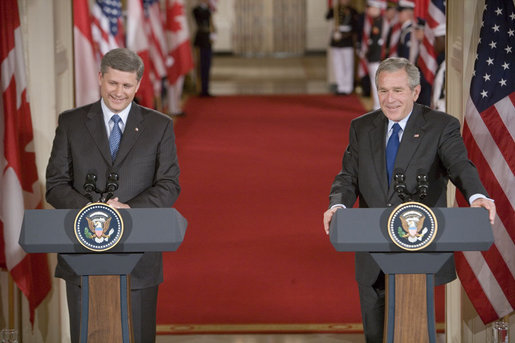
Stephen Harper holds a joint press conference with George W. Bush during a meeting in Washington, D.C., July 2006

Stephen Harper and George W. Bush were thought to share warm personal relations and also close ties between their administrations. Because Bush was unpopular among liberals in Canada (particularly in the media), this was underplayed by the Harper government.

Shortly after being congratulated by Bush for his victory in February 2006, Harper rebuked the U.S. ambassador to Canada David Wilkins for criticizing the Conservatives' plans to assert Canada's sovereignty over the Arctic Ocean waters with military force.

==== Stephen Harper and Barack Obama (January 2009 – November 2015) ====
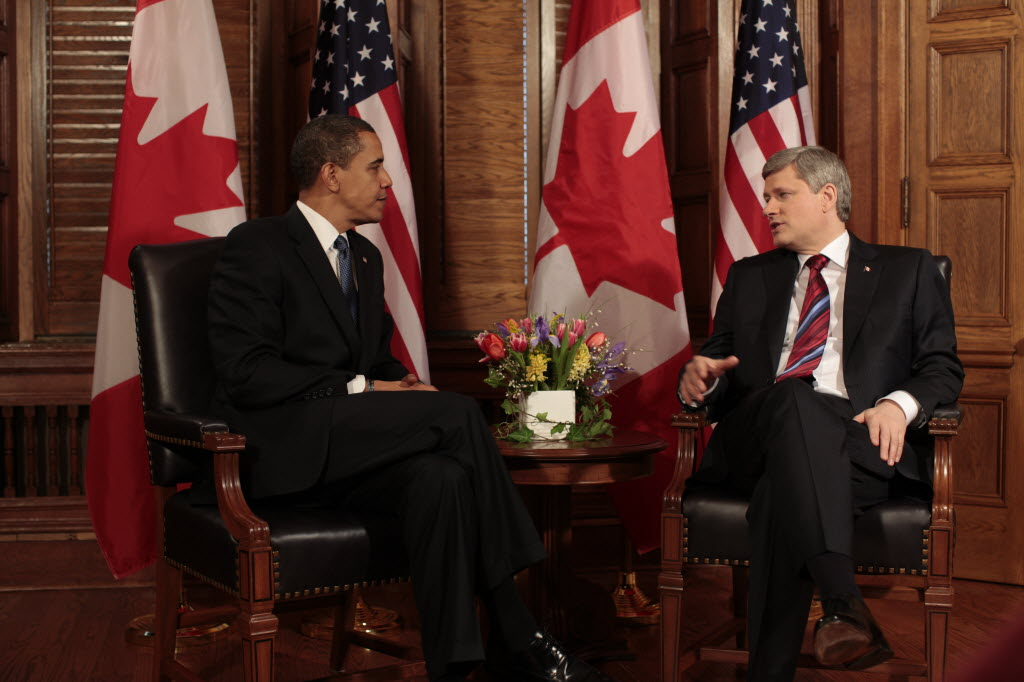
Barack Obama meeting with Stephen Harper in Ottawa, February 2009

President Barack Obama's first international trip was to Canada on February 19, 2009, thereby sending a strong message of peace and cooperation. Except Canadian lobbying against "Buy American" provisions in the U.S. stimulus package, relations between the two administrations were smooth.

They also held friendly bets on hockey games during the Winter Olympic season. In the 2010 Winter Olympics hosted by Canada in Vancouver, Canada defeated the U.S. in both gold medal matches, entitling Stephen Harper to receive a case of Molson Canadian beer from Barack Obama; in reverse, if Canada had lost, Harper would have provided a case of Yuengling beer to Obama. During the 2014 Winter Olympics, alongside U.S. Secretary of State John Kerry & Minister of Foreign Affairs John Baird, Stephen Harper was given a case of Samuel Adams beer by Obama for the Canadian gold medal victory over the U.S. in women's hockey, and the semi-final victory over the U.S. in men's hockey.

==== Canada–United States Regulatory Cooperation Council (RCC) (2011) ====
On February 4, 2011, Harper and Obama issued a "Declaration on a Shared Vision for Perimeter Security and Economic Competitiveness" and announced the creation of the Canada–United States Regulatory Cooperation Council (RCC) "to increase regulatory transparency and coordination between the two countries."

Health Canada and the United States Food and Drug Administration (FDA) under the RCC mandate, undertook the "first of its kind" initiative by selecting "as its first area of alignment common cold indications for certain over-the-counter antihistamine ingredients (GC January 10, 2013)".

On December 7, 2011, Harper flew to Washington, met with Obama, and signed an agreement to implement the joint action plans that had been developed since the initial meeting in February. The plans called on both countries to spend more on border infrastructure, share more information on people who cross the border, and acknowledge more of each other's safety and security inspection on third-country traffic. An editorial in The Globe and Mail praised the agreement for giving Canada the ability to track whether failed refugee claimants have left Canada via the U.S. and for eliminating "duplicated baggage screenings on connecting flights". The agreement is not a legally binding treaty and relies on the political will and ability of the executives of both governments to implement the terms of the agreement. These types of executive agreements are routine on both sides of the Canada–U.S. border.

=== Liberal government (2015–present) ===
==== Justin Trudeau and Barack Obama (November 2015 – January 2017) ====
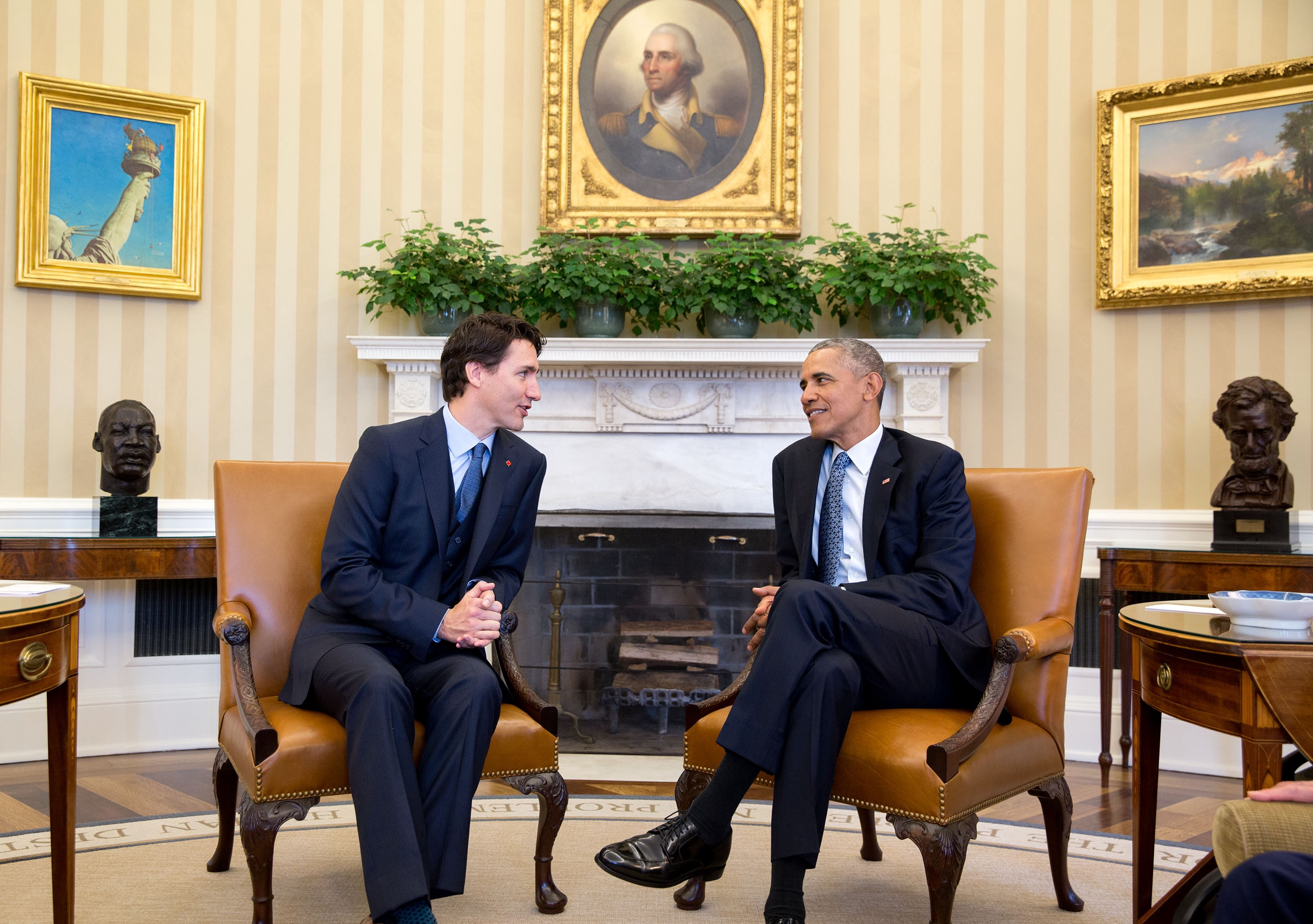
President Barack Obama and Prime Minister Justin Trudeau, March 2016

President Barack Obama and Prime Minister Justin Trudeau first met formally at the APEC summit meeting in Manila, Philippines in November 2015, nearly a week after the latter was sworn into office. Both leaders expressed eagerness for increased cooperation and coordination between the two countries during Trudeau's government with Trudeau promising an "enhanced Canada–U.S. partnership".

On November 6, 2015, Obama announced the U.S. State Department's rejection of the proposed Keystone XL pipeline, the fourth phase of the Keystone oil pipeline system running between Canada and the United States, to which Trudeau expressed disappointment but said that the rejection would not damage Canada–U.S. relations and would instead provide a "fresh start" to strengthening ties through cooperation and coordination, saying that "Canada–U.S. relationship is much bigger than any one project." Obama has since praised Trudeau's efforts to prioritize the reduction of climate change, calling it "extraordinarily helpful" to establish a worldwide consensus on addressing the issue.

Although Trudeau has told Obama his plans to withdraw Canada's McDonnell Douglas CF-18 Hornet jets assisting in the American-led intervention against ISIL, Trudeau said that Canada will still "do more than its part" in combating the terrorist group by increasing the number of Canadian special forces members training and fighting on the ground in Iraq and Syria.

Trudeau visited the White House for an official visit and state dinner on March 10, 2016. Trudeau and Obama were reported to have shared warm personal relations during the visit, making humorous remarks about which country was better at hockey and which country had better beer. Obama complimented Trudeau's 2015 election campaign for its "message of hope and change" and "positive and optimistic vision". Obama and Trudeau also held "productive" discussions on climate change and relations between the two countries, and Trudeau invited Obama to speak in the Canadian parliament in Ottawa later in the year.

==== Justin Trudeau and Donald Trump (January 2017 – January 2021) ====
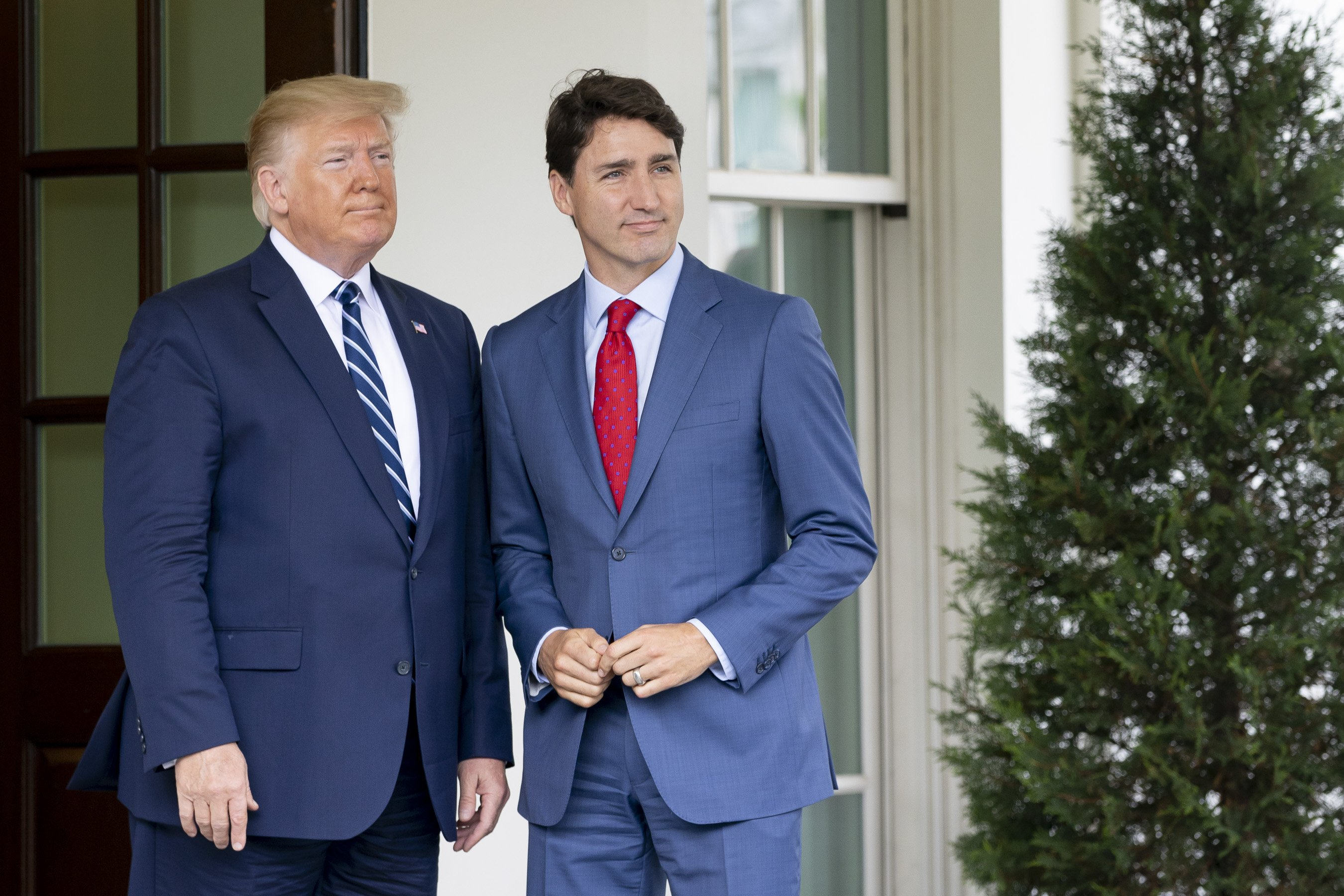
President Donald Trump and Prime Minister Justin Trudeau, June 2019

Following the victory of Donald Trump in the 2016 U.S. presidential election, Trudeau congratulated him and invited him to visit Canada at the "earliest opportunity". Prime Minister Trudeau and President Trump formally met for the first time at the White House on February 13, 2017, nearly a month after Trump was sworn into the office. Trump has ruffled relations with Canada with tariffs on softwood lumber. Diafiltered Milk was brought up by Trump as an area that needed negotiating.

In 2018, Trump and Trudeau negotiated the United States–Mexico–Canada Agreement (USMCA), a free trade agreement concluded between Canada, Mexico, and the United States that succeeded the North American Free Trade Agreement (NAFTA). The agreement has been characterized as "NAFTA 2.0", or "New NAFTA", since many provisions from NAFTA were incorporated and its changes were seen as largely incremental. On July 1, 2020, the USMCA entered into force in all member states.

In June 2018, after Trudeau explained that Canadians would not be "pushed around" by the first Trump tariffs on Canada's aluminum and steel, Trump labeled Trudeau as "dishonest" and "meek", and accused Trudeau of making "false statements", although it is unclear which statements Trump was referring to. Trump's adviser on trade, Peter Navarro, said that there was a "special place in hell" for Trudeau as he employed "bad faith diplomacy with President Trump and then tried to stab him in the back on the way out the door ... that comes right from Air Force One." Days later, Trump said that Trudeau's comments are "going to cost a lot of money for the people of Canada".

In June 2019, the U.S. State Department spokesperson Morgan Ortagus said the U.S. "view Canada's claim that the waters of the Northwest Passage are internal waters of Canada as inconsistent with international law".

==== Justin Trudeau and Joe Biden (January 2021 – January 2025) ====
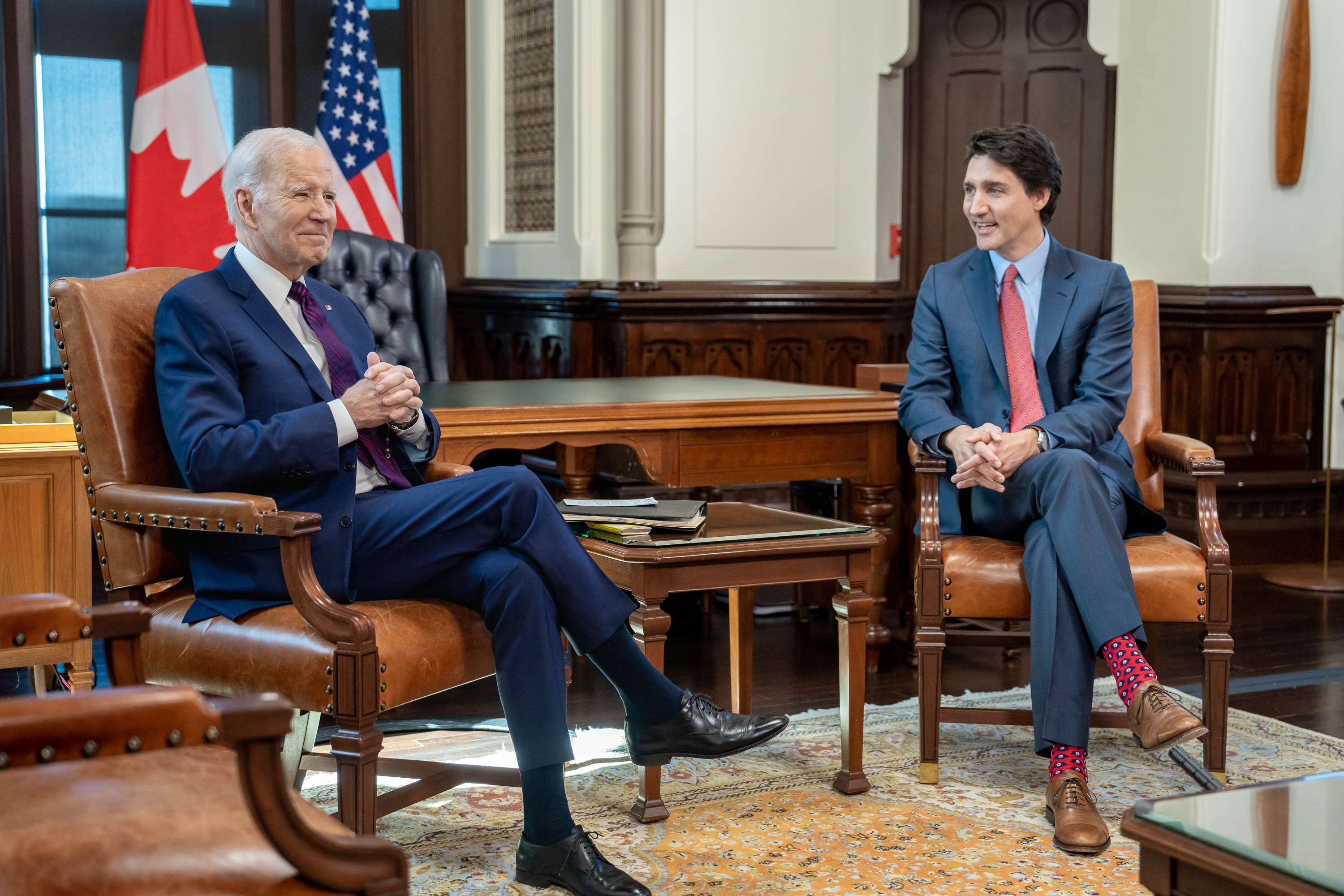
President Joe Biden and Prime Minister Justin Trudeau, March 2023

Following the victory of Joe Biden in the 2020 U.S. presidential election, Trudeau congratulated him on his victory; indicating a significant improvement in Canada–U.S. relationships, which had been strained in the years prior during the first Trump administration.

On January 22, 2021, Biden and Trudeau held their first phone call. Trudeau was the first foreign leader to receive a phone call from Biden as president.

On February 23, 2021, Biden and Trudeau held their first bilateral meeting. Although virtual, the bilateral meeting was Biden's first as president. The two leaders discussed "COVID-19, economic recovery, climate change, and refugees and migration" among other subjects.

==== Justin Trudeau and Donald Trump (January 2025 – March 2025) ====
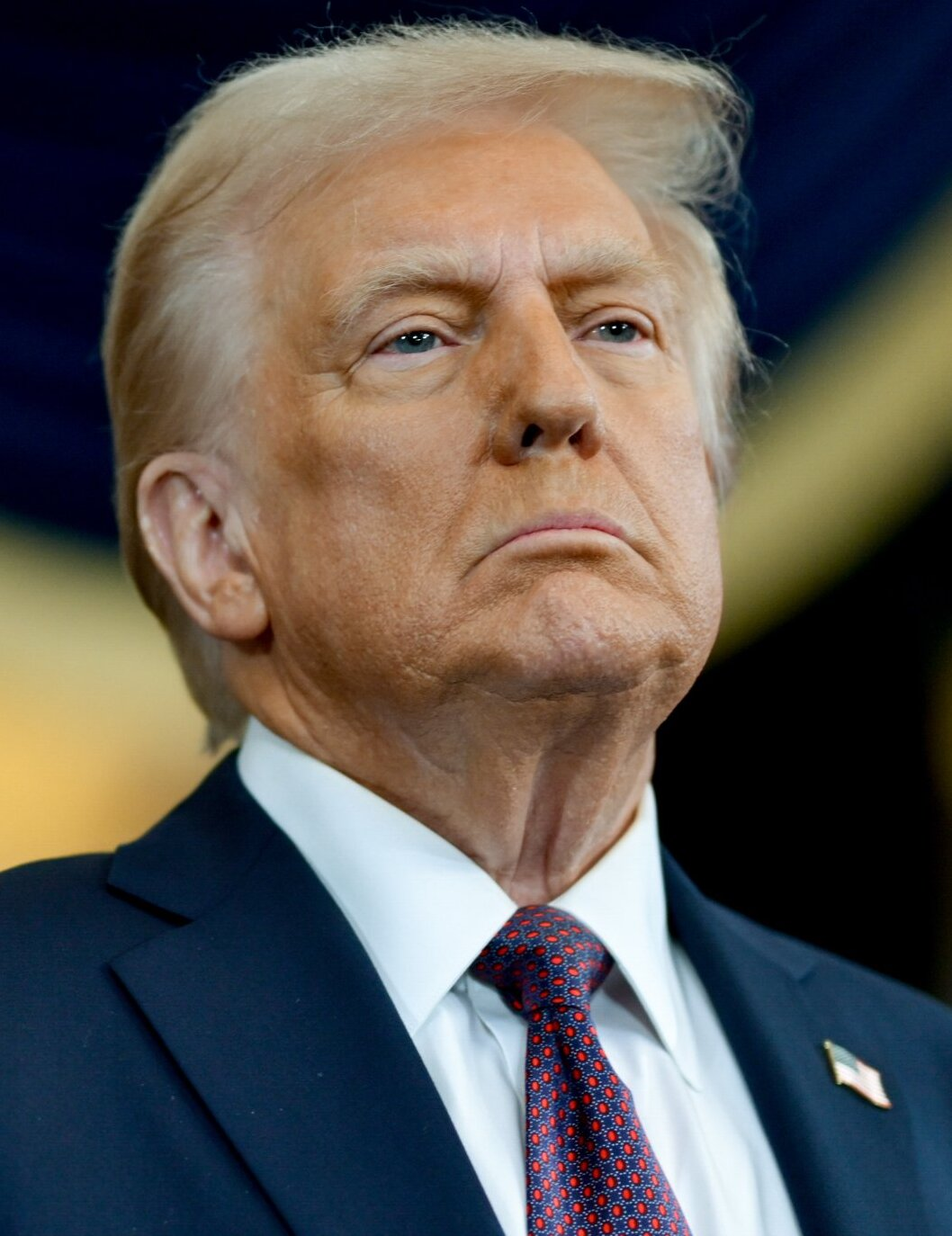
President Donald Trump (since January 20, 2025)

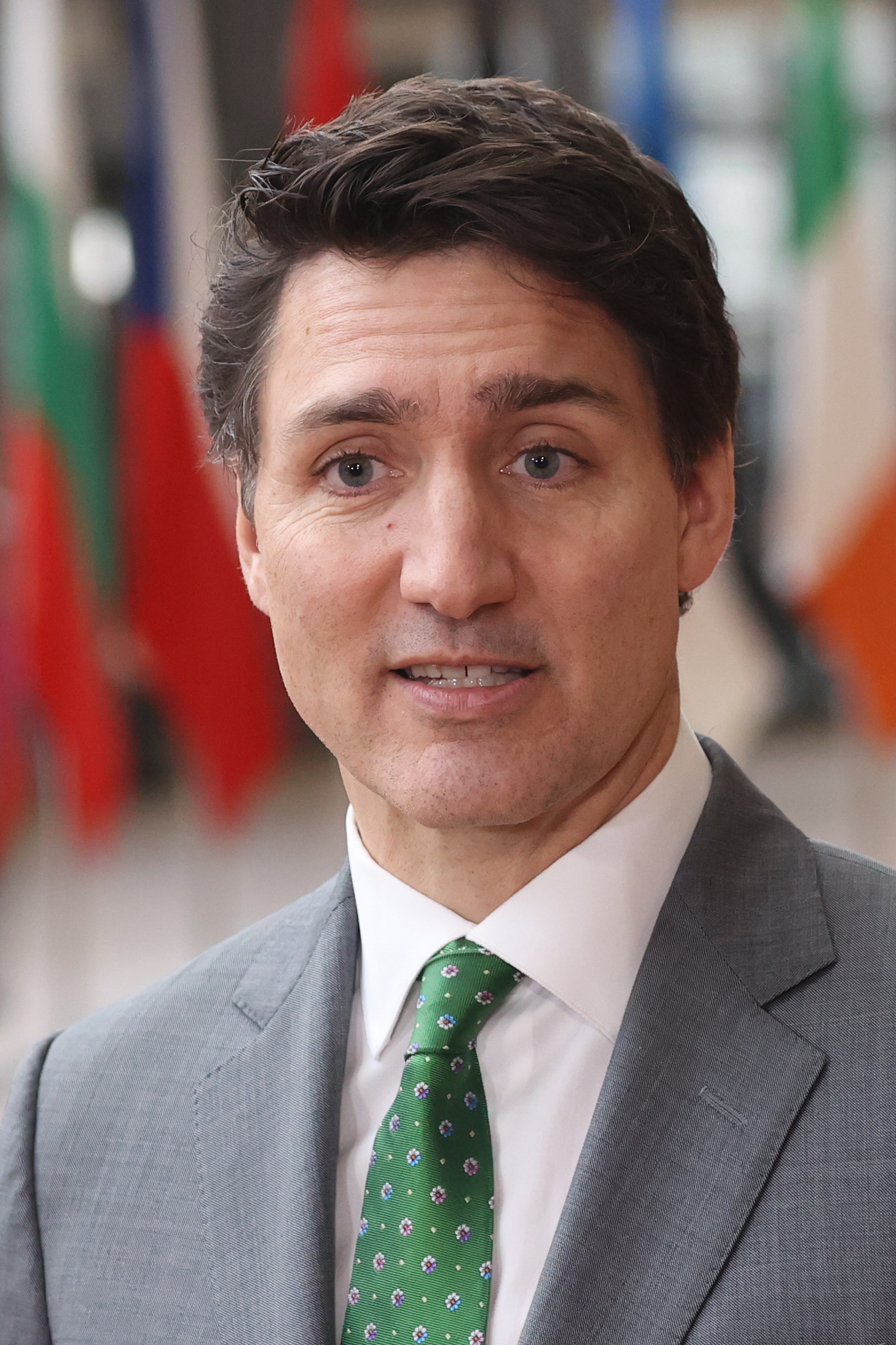
Prime Minister Justin Trudeau (until March 14, 2025)

During his 2024 campaign and continuing into his second presidency, Trump spoke repeatedly about imposing tariffs on Canada and making Canada the 51st U.S. state. On November 29, 2024, Trudeau met with Trump to address trade issues after Trump threatened a 25% tariff on Canadian imports and planned to rethink the USMCA. Trudeau warned of retaliation if tariffs were enacted. Trump continued his comments throughout December, calling Canada a state and Trudeau a governor. On December 18, he claimed many Canadians supported the idea of becoming the 51st state. Trudeau firmly rejected any possibility of annexation on January 7. In early February 2025, Trudeau announced retaliatory tariffs of 25% against the United States on CA$155 billion worth of U.S. goods.

==== Mark Carney and Donald Trump (March 2025 – present) ====
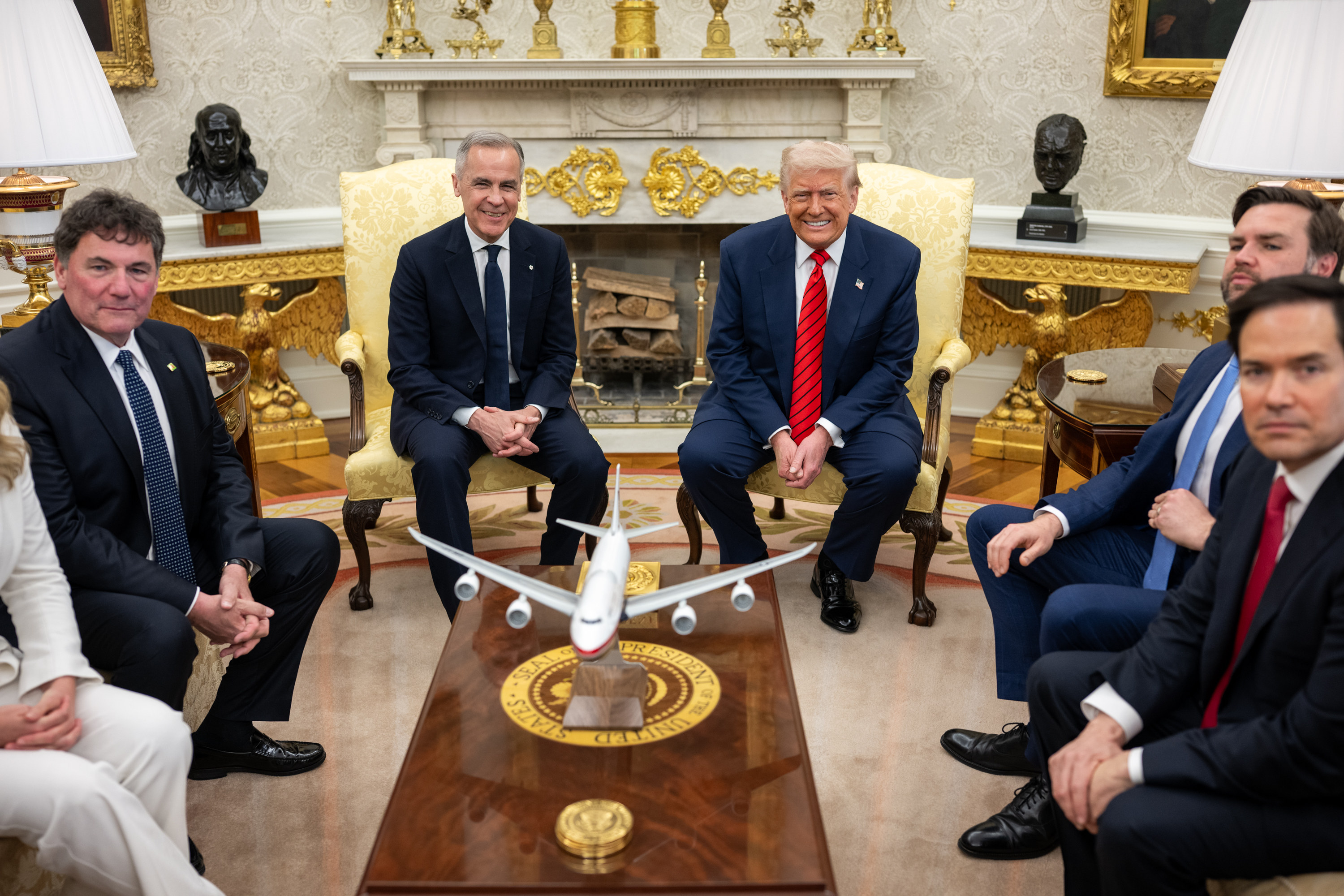
President Donald Trump and Prime Minister Mark Carney, May 2025

In March 2025, Mark Carney vowed to "win the trade war" against U.S. president Donald Trump, who had imposed tariffs on Canadian goods and suggested annexing Canada as the 51st state. Carney condemned Trump's "unjustified tariffs" and pledged retaliatory measures until the U.S. "shows respect." In light of increased hostility between the two nations, the prime minister claimed that the economic and military cooperation that Canada and the US once had was permanently altered to the point of the previously positive relations being over. Mark Carney's victory in the Canadian election signals a shift in the country's relationship with the United States, as he aims to reduce dependence on U.S. policies. Carney has vowed to combat U.S. tariffs and protect Canadian interests, focusing on strengthening ties with Europe and Asia. Prime Minister Carney and President Trump formally met for the first time at the White House on May 6, 2025, nearly two months after Carney replaced Trudeau in office, where Trump continued to suggest Canada's annexation with Carney next to him.

On May 28, 2025, Trump asserted that if Canada were to be formally annexed by the United States as the 51st state, it would be exempt from financial obligations associated with the so-called "Golden Dome" project.

Additionally, after Canada's negotiations with China, in January 2026, Trump threatened to impose a 100% tariff on Canadian imports if Canada moved forward with a potential trade agreement with China, as the existing USMCA agreement requires trilateral consultations before any signatory may begin trade talks with a non-market economy such as China. Trump argued that such an agreement could allow Canada to serve as a transit point for Chinese goods entering the United States, warning that Canada would face an immediate tariff if the deal proceeded. However, Canadian officials clarified that Ottawa was not negotiating a full trade agreement with China but only addressing specific tariff issues.

Despite the tariffs, on February 28, 2026 Carney expressed support for the United States after the attack on Iran, which led to Ali Khamenei's death.

== List and timeline of Canadian Prime Ministers and American Presidents ==
Canadian prime minister	American president	Start	End	Tenure
John A. Macdonald	Andrew Johnson	July 1, 1867	March 4, 1869	612 days
John A. Macdonald	Ulysses S. Grant	March 4, 1869	November 5, 1873	1707 days
Vacant	Ulysses S. Grant	November 5, 1873	November 7, 1873	2 days
Alexander Mackenzie	Ulysses S. Grant	November 7, 1873	March 4, 1877	1213 days
Alexander Mackenzie	Rutherford B. Hayes	March 4, 1877	October 8, 1878	583 days
Vacant	Rutherford B. Hayes	October 8, 1878	October 17, 1878	9 days
John A. Macdonald	Rutherford B. Hayes	October 17, 1878	March 4, 1881	869 days
John A. Macdonald	James A. Garfield	March 4, 1881	September 19, 1881	199 days
John A. Macdonald	Chester A. Arthur	September 19, 1881	March 4, 1885	1262 days
John A. Macdonald	Grover Cleveland	March 4, 1885	March 4, 1889	1461 days
John A. Macdonald	Benjamin Harrison	March 4, 1889	June 6, 1891	824 days
Vacant	Benjamin Harrison	June 6, 1891	June 16, 1891	10 days
John Abbott	Benjamin Harrison	June 16, 1891	November 24, 1892	527 days
Vacant	Benjamin Harrison	November 24, 1892	December 5, 1892	11 days
John Sparrow David Thompson	Benjamin Harrison	December 5, 1892	March 4, 1893	89 days
John Sparrow David Thompson	Grover Cleveland	March 4, 1893	December 12, 1894	648 days
Vacant	Grover Cleveland	December 12, 1894	December 21, 1894	9 days
Mackenzie Bowell	Grover Cleveland	December 21, 1894	April 27, 1896	493 days
Vacant	Grover Cleveland	April 27, 1896	May 1, 1896	4 days
Charles Tupper	Grover Cleveland	May 1, 1896	July 8, 1896	68 days
Vacant	Grover Cleveland	July 8, 1896	July 11, 1896	3 days
Wilfrid Laurier	Grover Cleveland	July 11, 1896	March 4, 1897	236 days
Wilfrid Laurier	William McKinley	March 4, 1897	September 14, 1901	1654 days
Wilfrid Laurier	Theodore Roosevelt	September 14, 1901	March 4, 1909	2728 days
Wilfrid Laurier	William Howard Taft	March 4, 1909	October 6, 1911	946 days
Vacant	William Howard Taft	October 6, 1911	October 10, 1911	4 days
Robert Borden	William Howard Taft	October 10, 1911	March 4, 1913	511 days
Robert Borden	Woodrow Wilson	March 4, 1913	July 10, 1920	2685 days
Arthur Meighen	Woodrow Wilson	July 10, 1920	March 4, 1921	237 days
Arthur Meighen	Warren G. Harding	March 4, 1921	December 29, 1921	300 days
William Lyon Mackenzie King	Warren G. Harding	December 29, 1921	August 2, 1923	581 days
William Lyon Mackenzie King	Calvin Coolidge	August 2, 1923	June 28, 1926	1061 days (first tenure; 1952 days in total)
Vacant	Calvin Coolidge	June 28, 1926	June 29, 1926	1 day
Arthur Meighen	Calvin Coolidge	June 29, 1926	September 25, 1926	88 days
William Lyon Mackenzie King	Calvin Coolidge	September 25, 1926	March 4, 1929	891 days (second tenure; 1952 days in total)
William Lyon Mackenzie King	Herbert Hoover	March 4, 1929	August 7, 1930	521 days
R. B. Bennett	Herbert Hoover	August 7, 1930	March 4, 1933	940 days
R. B. Bennett	Franklin D. Roosevelt	March 4, 1933	October 23, 1935	963 days
William Lyon Mackenzie King	Franklin D. Roosevelt	October 23, 1935	April 12, 1945	3459 days
William Lyon Mackenzie King	Harry S. Truman	April 12, 1945	November 15, 1948	1313 days
Louis St. Laurent	Harry S. Truman	November 15, 1948	January 20, 1953	1527 days
Louis St. Laurent	Dwight D. Eisenhower	January 20, 1953	June 21, 1957	1613 days
John Diefenbaker	Dwight D. Eisenhower	June 21, 1957	January 20, 1961	1309 days
John Diefenbaker	John F. Kennedy	January 20, 1961	April 22, 1963	822 days
Lester B. Pearson	John F. Kennedy	April 22, 1963	November 22, 1963	214 days
Lester B. Pearson	Lyndon B. Johnson	November 22, 1963	April 20, 1968	1611 days
Pierre Trudeau	Lyndon B. Johnson	April 20, 1968	January 20, 1969	275 days
Pierre Trudeau	Richard Nixon	January 20, 1969	August 9, 1974	2027 days
Pierre Trudeau	Gerald Ford	August 9, 1974	January 20, 1977	895 days
Pierre Trudeau	Jimmy Carter	January 20, 1977	June 4, 1979	865 days (first tenure; 1188 days in total)
Joe Clark	Jimmy Carter	June 4, 1979	March 3, 1980	273 days
Pierre Trudeau	Jimmy Carter	March 3, 1980	January 20, 1981	323 days (second tenure; 1188 days in total)
Pierre Trudeau	Ronald Reagan	January 20, 1981	June 30, 1984	1257 days
John Turner	Ronald Reagan	June 30, 1984	September 17, 1984	79 days
Brian Mulroney	Ronald Reagan	September 17, 1984	January 20, 1989	1586 days
Brian Mulroney	George H. W. Bush	January 20, 1989	January 20, 1993	1461 days
Brian Mulroney	Bill Clinton	January 20, 1993	June 25, 1993	156 days
Kim Campbell	Bill Clinton	June 25, 1993	November 4, 1993	132 days
Jean Chrétien	Bill Clinton	November 4, 1993	January 20, 2001	2634 days
Jean Chrétien	George W. Bush	January 20, 2001	December 12, 2003	1056 days
Paul Martin	George W. Bush	December 12, 2003	February 6, 2006	787 days
Stephen Harper	George W. Bush	February 6, 2006	January 20, 2009	1079 days
Stephen Harper	Barack Obama	January 20, 2009	November 4, 2015	2479 days
Justin Trudeau	Barack Obama	November 4, 2015	January 20, 2017	443 days
Justin Trudeau	Donald Trump	January 20, 2017	January 20, 2021	1461 days (first tenure; 1514 days in total)
Justin Trudeau	Joe Biden	January 20, 2021	January 20, 2025	1461 days
Justin Trudeau	Donald Trump	January 20, 2025	March 14, 2025	53 days (second tenure; 1514 days in total)
Mark Carney	Donald Trump	March 14, 2025	Present day	618 days (as of 2026-11-22)

== Military and security ==
The Canadian military, like forces of other NATO countries, fought in cooperation with the United States in most major conflicts since World War II, including the Korean War, the Gulf War, the Kosovo War, and most recently the war in Afghanistan. The main exceptions to this were the Canadian government's opposition to some CIA activities in Canada, the Vietnam War, and the Iraq War, which caused some brief diplomatic tensions. Despite these issues, military relations have remained close.

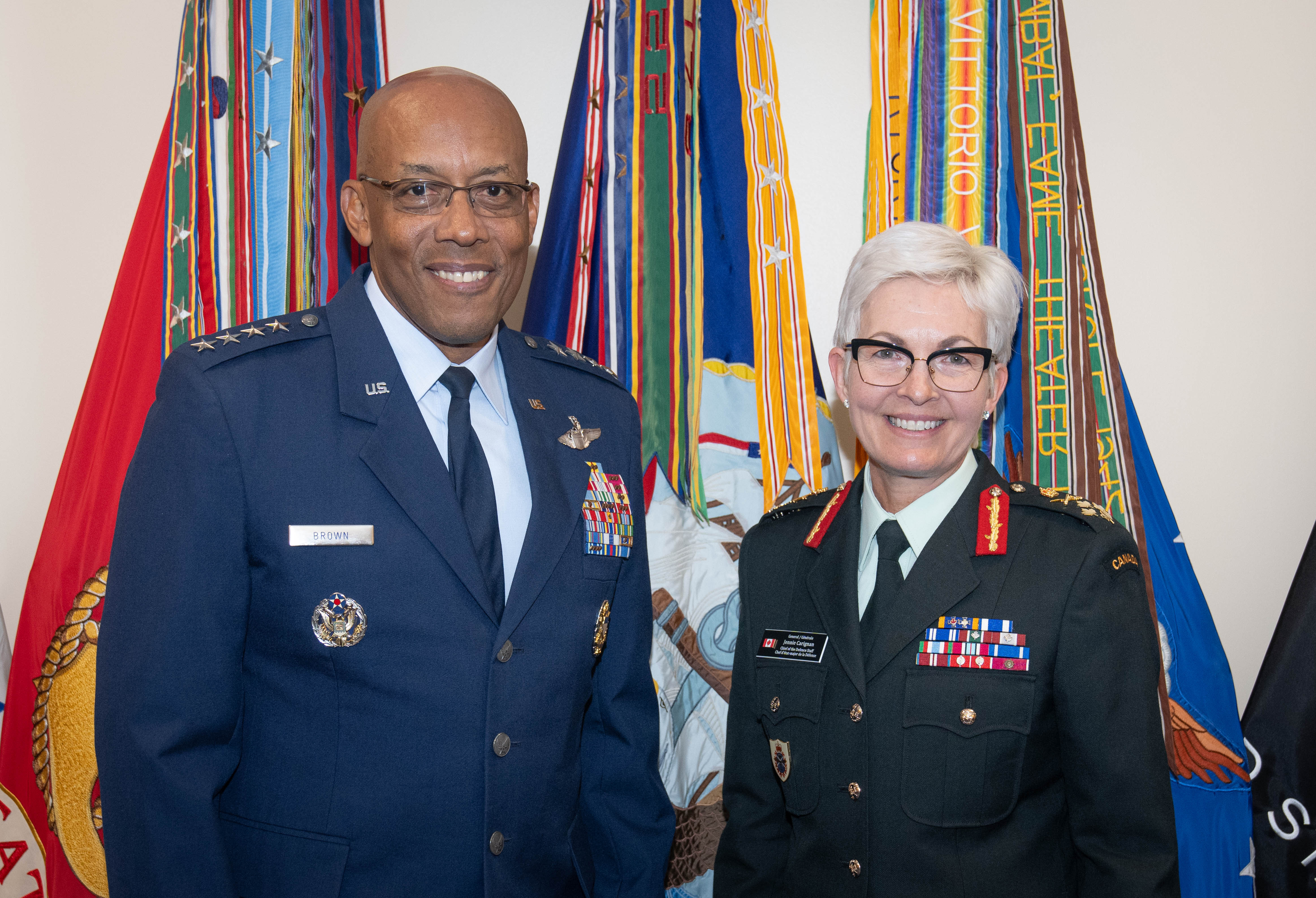
General CQ Brown Jr., Chairman of the Joint Chiefs of Staff, meets with General Jennie Carignan, Chief of the Defence Staff, Canadian Armed Forces at the Pentagon in October 2024

American defense arrangements with Canada are more extensive than with any other country. The Permanent Joint Board of Defense, established in 1940, provides policy-level consultation on bilateral defense matters. The United States and Canada share North Atlantic Treaty Organization (NATO) mutual security commitments. In addition, American and Canadian military forces have cooperated since 1958 on continental air defense within the framework of the North American Aerospace Defense Command (NORAD). Canadian forces have provided indirect support for the American invasion of Iraq that began in 2003. Moreover, interoperability with the American armed forces has been a guiding principle of Canadian military force structuring and doctrine since the end of the Cold War. Canadian navy frigates, for instance, integrate seamlessly into American carrier battle groups.

In commemoration of the 200th Anniversary of the War of 1812, ambassadors from Canada and the United States, and naval officers from both countries gathered at the Pritzker Military Library on August 17, 2012, for a panel discussion on Canada–U.S. relations with emphasis on national security-related matters. Also, as part of the commemoration, the navies of both countries sailed together throughout the Great Lakes region.

According to Canadian and U.S. officials, a U.S. fighter jet shot down an unidentified object over Canada on February 23, 2023, on the orders of Prime Minister Justin Trudeau. The operation was coordinated by the North American Aerospace Defense Command (NORAD), a joint U.S.-Canadian air defense organization. Prime Minister Trudeau said investigators were looking for debris. This decision was made following the conversation between Biden and Trudeau.

The foreign policies of the countries have been closely aligned, yet ultimately independent, since the Cold War. There is also debate on whether the Northwest Passage is in international waters or under Canadian sovereignty.

=== Iran hostage crisis ===
During the 1979 revolution, protesters invaded the U.S. embassy and took many hostages. Six Americans evaded capture and were sheltered by the British and Canadian diplomatic missions. After a U.S. military operation to get them out of Iran failed, Canadian diplomat Ken Taylor, Secretary of State for External Affairs Flora MacDonald, and Prime Minister Joe Clark decided to smuggle the six Americans out of Iran on an international flight by using Canadian passports. An Order in Council was made to issue multiple official copies of Canadian passports with fake identities to the American diplomats in the Canadian sanctuary. The passports contained forged Iranian visas prepared by the U.S. Central Intelligence Agency.

=== War in Afghanistan ===
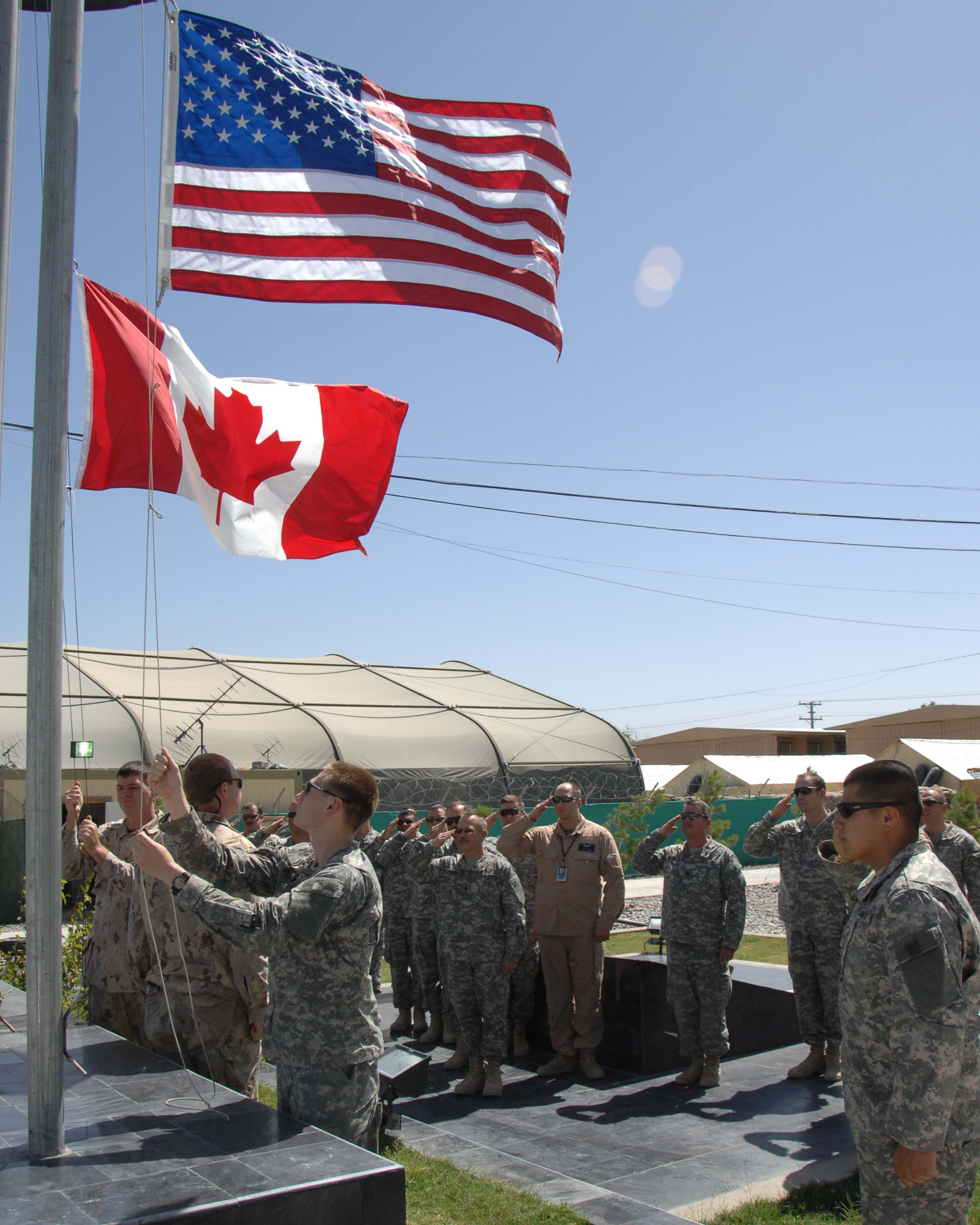
American and Canadian ISAF soldiers gather to commemorate the 65th anniversary of 1st Special Service Force in Bagram, Afghanistan. The 1st Special Service Force was an American-Canadian unit during World War II.

Canada's elite JTF2 unit joined American special forces in Afghanistan shortly after the al-Qaeda attacks on September 11, 2001. Canadian forces joined the multinational coalition in Operation Anaconda in January 2002. On April 18, 2002, an American pilot bombed Canadian forces involved in a training exercise, killing four and wounding eight Canadians. A joint American-Canadian inquiry determined the cause of the incident to be pilot error, in which the pilot interpreted ground fire as an attack; the pilot ignored orders that he felt were "second-guessing" his field tactical decision. Canadian forces assumed a six-month command rotation of the International Security Assistance Force in 2003; in 2005, Canadians assumed operational command of the multi-national Brigade in Kandahar, with 2,300 troops, and supervises the Provincial Reconstruction Team in Kandahar, where al-Qaida forces are most active. Canada has also deployed naval forces in the Persian Gulf since 1991 in support of the UN Gulf Multinational Interdiction Force.

The Canadian Embassy in Washington, D.C. maintains a public relations website named CanadianAlly.com, which is intended "to give American citizens a better sense of the scope of Canada's role in North American and Global Security and the War on Terror".

The New Democratic Party and some recent Liberal leadership candidates have expressed opposition to Canada's expanded role in the Afghan conflict because it is inconsistent with Canada's historic role (since the Second World War) of peacekeeping operations.

=== 2003 Invasion of Iraq ===
According to contemporary polls, 71% of Canadians were opposed to the 2003 invasion of Iraq. Many Canadians, and the former Liberal Cabinet headed by Paul Martin (as well as many Americans such as Bill Clinton and Barack Obama), made a policy distinction between conflicts in Afghanistan and Iraq, unlike the Bush Doctrine, which linked these together in a "Global war on terror".

=== Responding to ISIS/Daesh ===
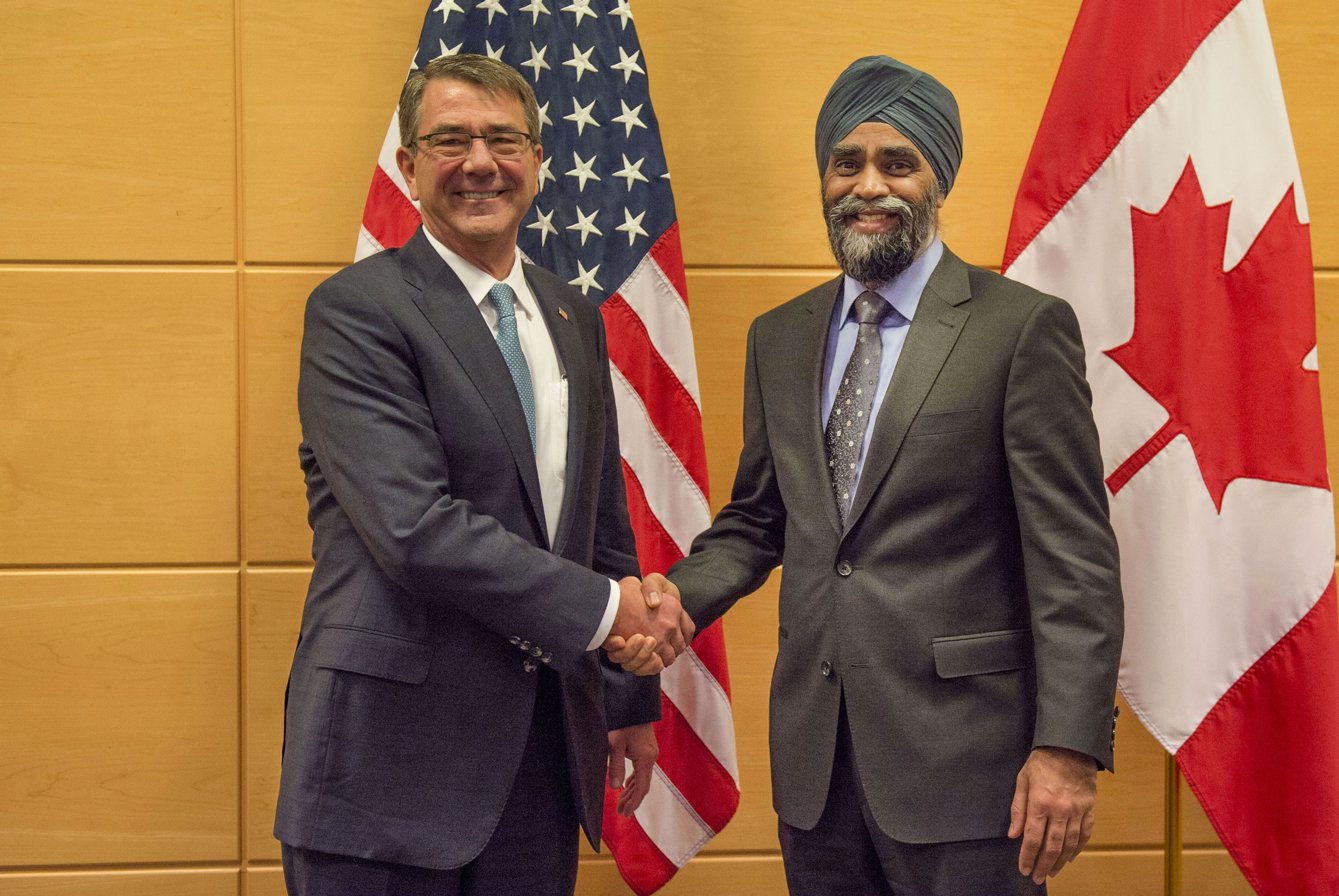
Canadian Minister of Defence Harjit Sajjan meets with U.S. Secretary of Defense Ash Carter at NATO headquarters in 2016

Canada has been involved in international responses to the threats from Daesh/ISIS/ISIL in Syria and Iraq and is a member of the Global Coalition to Counter Daesh. In October 2016, Foreign Affairs Minister Dion and National Defence Minister Sajjan met the U.S. special envoy for this coalition. The Americans thanked Canada "for the role of Canadian Armed Forces (CAF) in providing training and assistance to Iraqi security forces, as well as the CAF's role in improving essential capacity-building capabilities with regional forces".

=== Illicit drugs ===
In 2003, the American government became concerned when members of the Canadian government announced plans to decriminalize the use of cannabis. David Murray, an assistant to the U.S. Drug Czar John P. Walters, said in a CBC interview that, "We would have to respond. We would be forced to respond." However, the election of the Conservative Party in early 2006 halted the liberalization of cannabis laws until the Liberal Party of Canada legalized recreational cannabis use in 2018.

A 2007 joint report by American and Canadian officials on cross-border drug smuggling indicated that, despite their best efforts, "drug trafficking still occurs in significant quantities in both directions across the border. The principal illicit substances smuggled across our shared border are MDMA (Ecstasy), cocaine, and cannabis" The report indicated that Canada was a major producer of Ecstasy and marijuana for the U.S. market, while the U.S. was a transit country for cocaine entering Canada.

=== Defense acquisitions ===
In January 2026, U.S. Ambassador to Canada Pete Hoekstra warned that PM Mark Carney's decision to scale back or cancel Canada's planned F-35 purchase over tariff threats would require changes to NORAD, with the United States likely acquiring additional aircraft and sending fighter jets into Canadian airspace.

In the context of these developments, reports indicated growing debate within Canada regarding its defence relationship with the United States, particularly in relation to military procurement and strategic dependence. According to statements attributed to Canadian prime minister Mark Carney and reporting by multiple media outlets, the government signaled a policy direction aimed at reducing reliance on U.S. military equipment and increasing domestic defence procurement. Carney was reported to have emphasized strengthening Canada's domestic defence industry and diversifying procurement sources.

Media coverage also noted that Canada's defence spending has historically been closely linked to U.S. suppliers, with some reports citing approximately 70 percent dependence on American military procurement. The proposed policy shift was described by analysts as part of a broader effort to increase national defence autonomy and support domestic industry.

== Trade ==
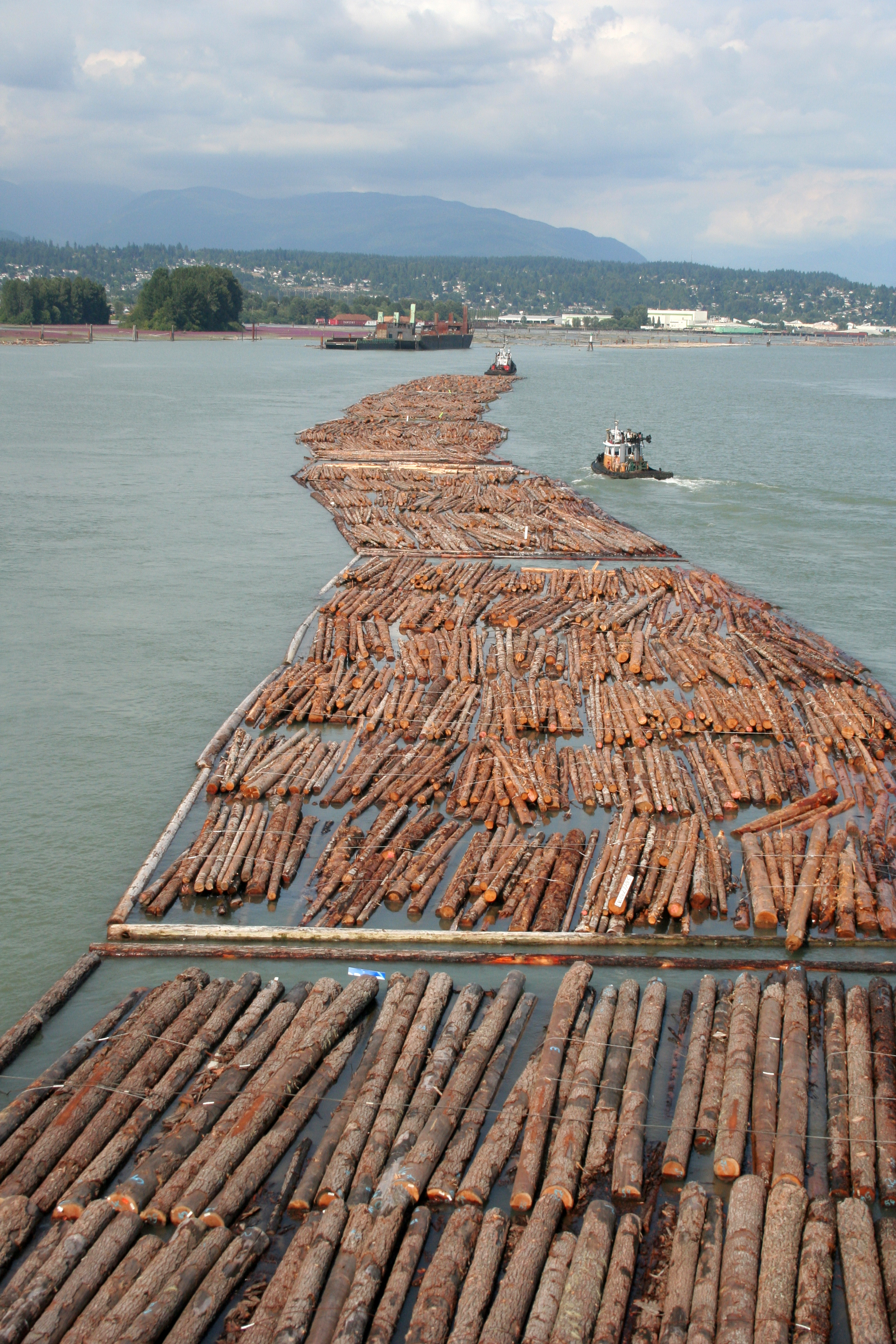
Timber being floated along the Fraser River in Vancouver. Trade disputes over softwood lumber exist between the two countries.

Canada and the United States have the world's second-largest trading relationship, with huge quantities of goods and people flowing across the border each year. Since the 1987 Canada–United States Free Trade Agreement, there have been no tariffs on most goods passed between the two countries.

In the course of the softwood lumber dispute, the U.S. has placed tariffs on Canadian softwood lumber because of what it argues is an unfair Canadian government subsidy, a claim that Canada disputes. The dispute has cycled through several agreements and arbitration cases. Other notable disputes include the Canadian Wheat Board, and Canadian cultural protectionism in cultural industries such as magazines, radio, and television. Canadians have been criticized about such things as the ban on beef since a case of Mad Cow disease was discovered in 2003 in cows from the United States (and a few subsequent cases), and the high American agricultural subsidies. Concerns in Canada also run high over aspects of the North American Free Trade Agreement (NAFTA) such as Chapter 11, before its suspension and replacement with USMCA.

On March 4, 2025, newly elected President Donald Trump imposed a 25% tariff on all Canadian imports, except energy products, which were subject to a 10% tariff, claiming it was to counter illegal immigration and the distribution of fentanyl. Statistics, however, show most illegal immigration on the US-Canadian border comes from the US, and fentanyl distribution from Canada is barely 0.2% compared to over 98% coming out of Mexico. Canada had also already been in the process of implementing more advanced border security in December 2024 a month before Trump's inauguration. In response, Canadian prime minister Justin Trudeau announced 25% tariffs on $30 billion worth of U.S. goods, with an additional $125 billion in tariffs planned for the following weeks. On March 6, Trump delayed tariffs on goods compliant with the United States–Mexico–Canada Agreement (USMCA)—accounting for approximately 38% of imports from Canada. Although the exemption was expected to end on April 2, the U.S. said it would continue indefinitely.

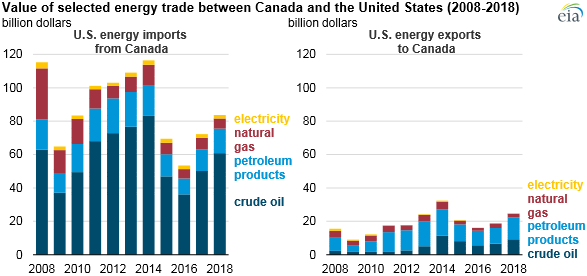
Trade in energy products, 2008–2018

Donald Trump announced on October 25 that he would raise U.S. tariffs on Canada by 10 percent in retaliation for an anti-tariff ad that used excerpts from a Reagan speech in 1987 in which he said that "trade barriers hurt every American worker." On October 25, Ontario Premier Doug Ford announced that he would withdraw the anti-tariff advertisement. Ford claimed the campaign had met its goal of reaching senior U.S. audiences to prompt dialogue about the type of economy Americans want and the effects of tariffs.

On August 25, 2026, in direct response to the sweeping tariffs imposed by the administration of President Donald Trump, the Canadian government announced retaliatory duties of up to 50 percent on a wide range of American-made goods. The countermeasures, set to take effect on September 8, are designed to mirror the United States' actions on a dollar-for-dollar and rate-for-rate basis, targeting nearly $20 billion worth of U.S. imports. The newly imposed tariffs will apply to more than 700 product categories from the United States, encompassing everyday consumer items such as seafood, cheese, clothing, cosmetics, and toilet paper. While the duties will inevitably affect cross-border commerce, Canadian officials have emphasized that the primary objective is not to generate government revenue. Rather, the measures are intended to shield domestic industries from the disruptive impact of American tariffs, to diminish Canada's long-standing dependence on U.S. imports, and to preserve a competitive environment in which Canadian businesses and workers can operate on fair and equitable terms.

== Cultural relations ==
=== Sports ===
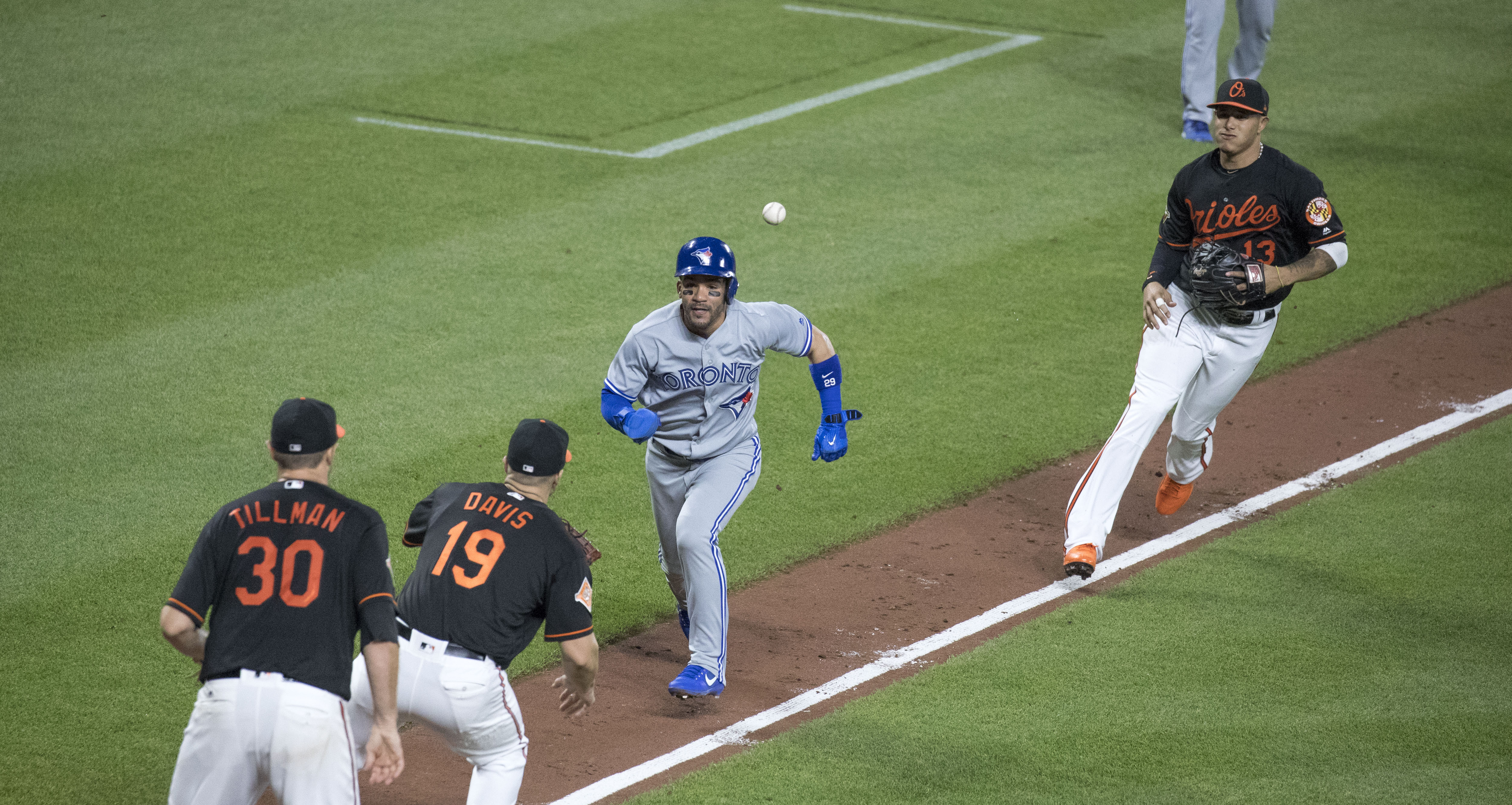
A Toronto Blue Jays baserunner attempting to score against the Baltimore Orioles. Several sports leagues in the United States feature Canadian teams

Several major sports that are popular in the United States have origins in or influences from Canada, such as basketball, which was invented by Canadian-American James Naismith. Other sports show similarities between the two nations' histories as well as their ongoing relationship; for example, Canadian football is similar to American football, but the Canadian Football League restricts the number of American players that can participate to ensure a more Canadian product. During the second Trump presidency, sports have become a way for bilateral tensions to be contested, with fans of each country more frequently booing the national anthem of the other country before games.

The early history and formation of North American baseball were deeply involved with both nations. American migrants played a role in expanding the presence of baseball in Canada, and due to the difficulty of long-distance travel, provincial Canadian teams often played against neighboring American regions rather than against each other.

Traditionally, high-level American hockey development often involved players participating in Canadian competitions, which were of a higher caliber. In the 21st century, American teams have reached greater parity with Canadian teams both at the international level and in the National Hockey League.

In 2026, the two nations (along with Mexico) co-hosted the FIFA World Cup.

=== Tourism ===
Following the Trump administration's tariffs and rhetoric in 2025, Tourism Economics expects travel from Canada to the United States to decline by 20 percent this year, a decline that will be felt most severely in border states like New York and Michigan, as well as popular tourist destinations like California, Nevada, and Florida.

== Environmental issues ==
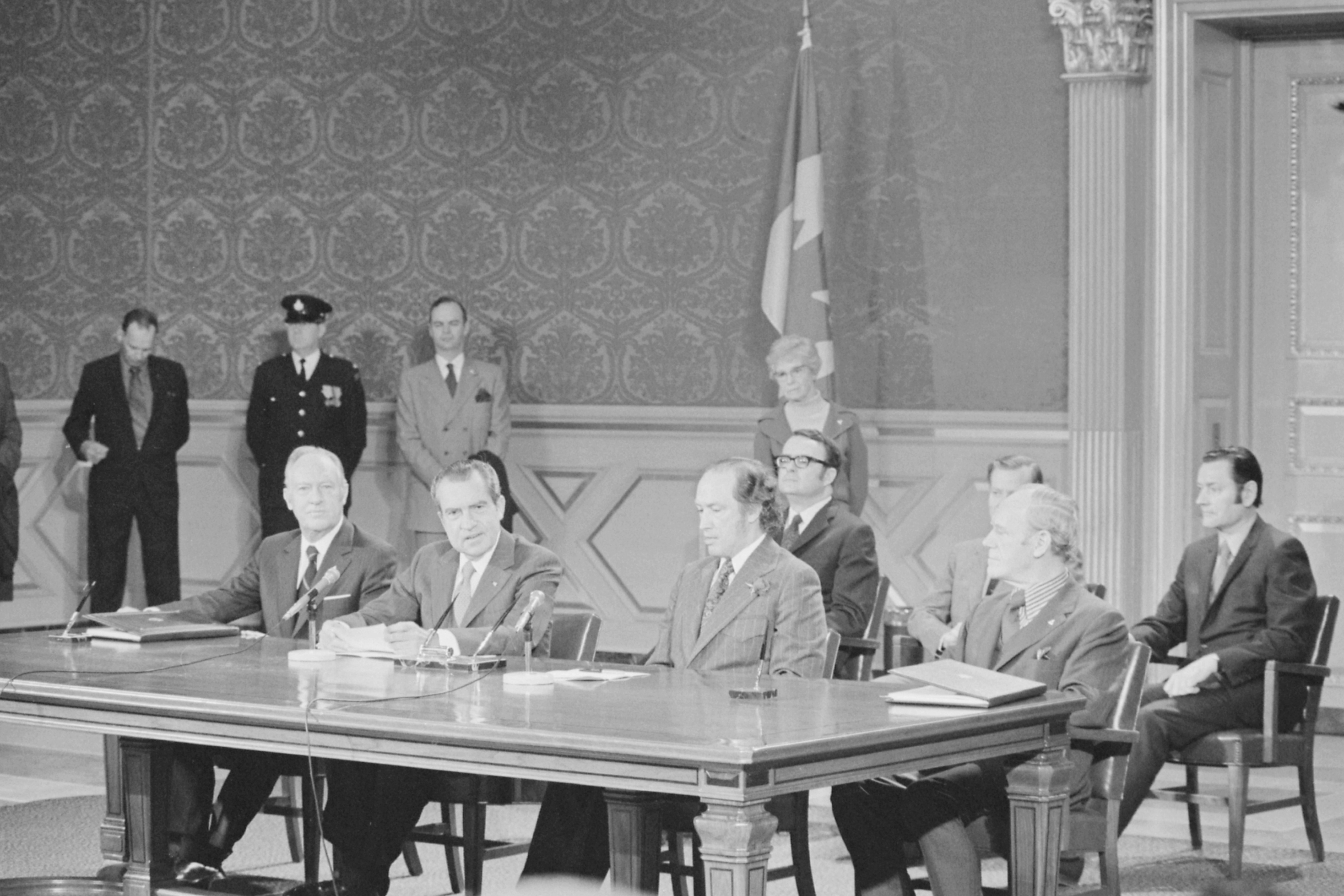
Richard Nixon and Pierre Trudeau at the signing ceremony for the Great Lakes Water Quality Agreement in 1972

A principal instrument of this cooperation is the International Joint Commission (IJC), established as part of the Boundary Waters Treaty of 1909 to resolve differences and promote international cooperation on boundary waters. The Great Lakes Water Quality Agreement of 1972 is another historic example of cooperation in controlling transboundary water pollution. However, there have been some disputes. Most recently, the Devil's Lake Outlet, a project instituted by North Dakota, has angered Manitobans who fear that their water may soon become polluted as a result of this project.

Beginning in 1986, the Canadian government of Brian Mulroney began pressing the Reagan administration for an "Acid Rain Treaty" to do something about U.S. industrial air pollution causing acid rain in Canada. The Reagan administration was hesitant and questioned the science behind Mulroney's claims. However, Mulroney was able to prevail. The product was the signing and ratification of the Air Quality Agreement of 1991 by the first Bush administration. Under that treaty, the two governments consult semi-annually on transboundary air pollution, which has demonstrably reduced acid rain, and they have since signed an annex to the treaty dealing with ground-level ozone in 2000. Despite this, trans-border air pollution remains an issue, particularly in the Great Lakes-St. Lawrence watershed during the summer. The main source of this transboundary pollution results from coal-fired power stations, most of them located in the Midwestern United States. As part of the negotiations to create NAFTA, Canada and the U.S. signed, along with Mexico, the North American Agreement on Environmental Cooperation that created the Commission for Environmental Cooperation that monitors environmental issues across the continent, publishing the North American Environmental Atlas as one aspect of its monitoring duties.

Currently, neither of the countries' governments supports the Kyoto Protocol, which sets out time-scheduled curbing of greenhouse gas emissions. Unlike the United States, Canada has ratified the agreement. Yet after ratification, due to internal political conflict within Canada, the Canadian government does not enforce the Kyoto Protocol and has received criticism from environmental groups and other governments for its climate change positions. In January 2011, the Canadian minister of the environment, Peter Kent, explicitly stated that the policy of his government about greenhouse gas emissions reductions is to wait for the United States to act first, and then try to harmonize with that action – a position that has been condemned by environmentalists and Canadian nationalists, and as well as scientists and government think-tanks.

With large freshwater supplies in Canada and long-term concern about water scarcity in parts of the United States, water export availability or restriction has been identified as an issue of possible future contention between the countries.

=== Newfoundland fisheries dispute ===
The United States and Britain had a long-standing dispute about the rights of Americans fishing in the waters near Newfoundland. Before 1776, there was no question that American fishermen, mostly from Massachusetts, had rights to use the waters off Newfoundland. In the peace treaty negotiations of 1783, the Americans insisted on a statement of these rights. However, France, an American ally, disputed the American position because France had its own specified rights in the area and wanted them to be exclusive. The Treaty of Paris (1783) gave the Americans not rights, but rather "liberties" to fish within the territorial waters of British North America and to dry fish on certain coasts.

After the War of 1812, the Convention of 1818 between the United States and Britain specified exactly what liberties were involved. Canadian and Newfoundland fishermen contested these liberties in the 1830s and 1840s. The Canadian–American Reciprocity Treaty of 1854, and the Treaty of Washington of 1871 spelled out the liberties in more detail. However, the Treaty of Washington expired in 1885, and there was a continuous round of disputes over jurisdictions and liberties. Britain and the United States sent the issue to the Permanent Court of Arbitration in The Hague in 1909. It produced a compromise settlement that permanently ended the problems.

== Common memberships ==
Canada and the United States both hold membership in several multinational organizations, including:

- American Hockey League (AHL)
- Arctic Council
- Asia-Pacific Economic Cooperation
- Canadian Hockey League (CHL)
- CONCACAF
- FIBA
- FIFA
- Food and Agriculture Organization
- G7
- G-10
- G-20 major economies
- International Chamber of Commerce
- International Development Association
- International Ice Hockey Federation (IIHF)
- International Monetary Fund (IMF)
- International Olympic Committee (IOC)
- Interpol
- Major League Baseball (MLB)
- Major League Soccer (MLS)
- National Basketball Association (NBA)
- National Hockey League (NHL)
- National Lacrosse League (NLL)
- National Wrestling Alliance (NWA)
- North American Free Trade Agreement (NAFTA) [Defunct, US Terminated Agreement]
- North American Aerospace Defense Command (NORAD)
- North American Numbering Plan
- North Atlantic Treaty Organization (NATO)
- Organization of American States
- Organisation for Economic Co-operation and Development (OECD)
- Professional Women's Hockey League (PWHL)
- Security and Prosperity Partnership of North America
- UKUSA Community
- United Nations (UN)
- UNESCO
- Women's National Basketball Association (WNBA)
- World Bowling
- World Trade Organization (WTO)
- World Bank
- World Rugby

== Territorial disputes ==
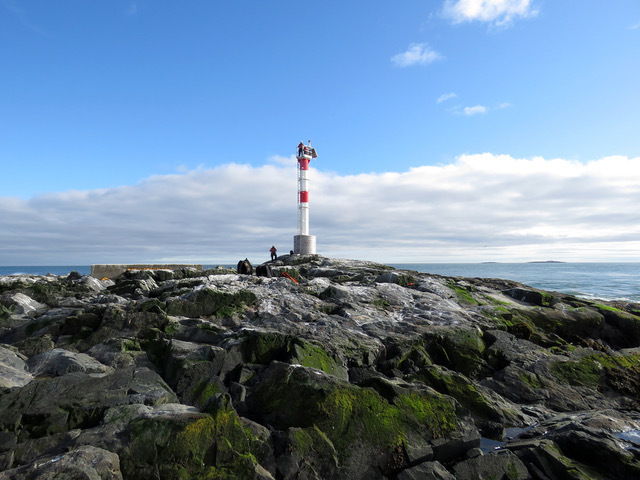
A "buoy" on Machias Seal Island. The waters around the island are one of several maritime territorial disputes between the two countries.

The two countries have had several territorial disputes throughout their histories. Current maritime territorial disputes between the two countries include the Beaufort Sea, Dixon Entrance, Strait of Juan de Fuca, San Juan Islands, Machias Seal Island, and North Rock. Additionally, the United States is one of several countries that contend the Northwest Passage is international waters; whereas the Canadian government asserts it forms Canadian Internal Waters. The Inside Passage is also disputed as international waters by the United States.

Historical boundary disputes include the Aroostook War at the Maine–New Brunswick border; the Oregon boundary dispute at the present day British Columbia–Washington border; and the Alaska Boundary Dispute at the Alaska–British Columbia border. The Maine–New Brunswick boundary dispute was resolved through the Webster–Ashburton Treaty in 1842, the Oregon boundary dispute through the Oregon Treaty of 1846, and the Alaska boundary dispute through arbitration in 1903.

=== Northwest Passage ===
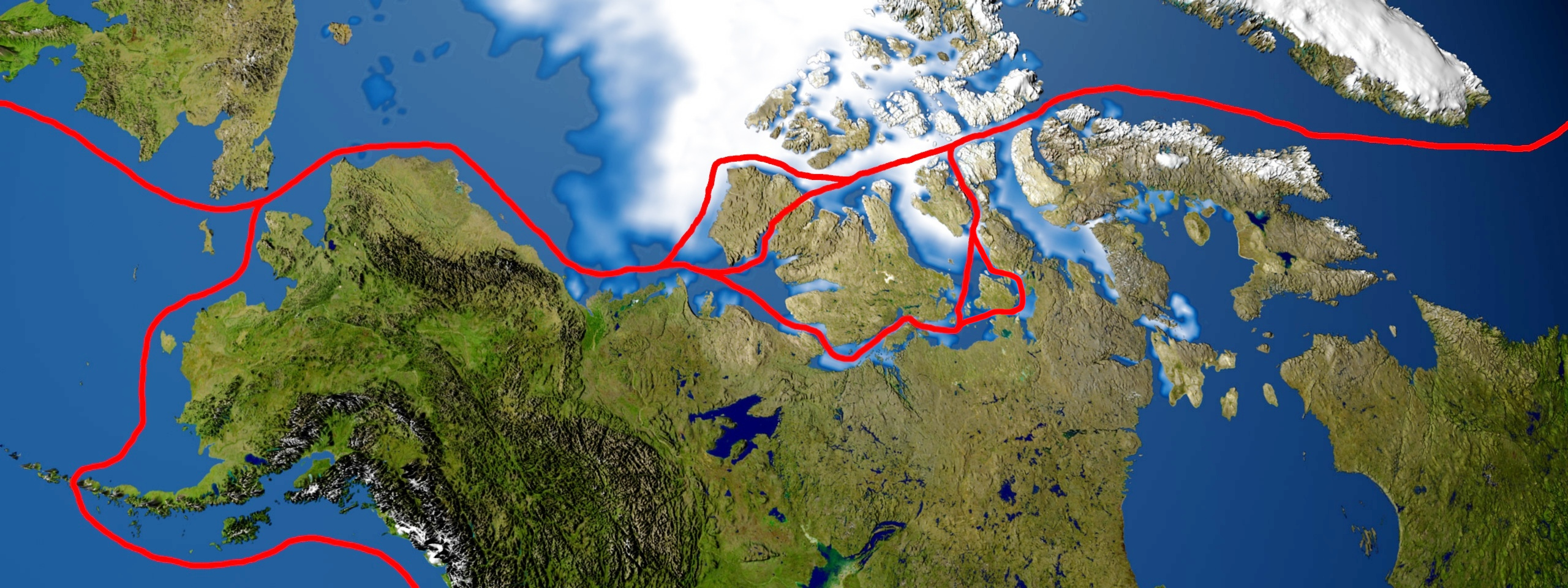
Popular routes on the Northwest Passage

A long-simmering dispute between Canada and the U.S. involves the issue of Canadian sovereignty over the Northwest Passage (the sea passages through the Arctic Archipelago). Canada's assertion that the Northwest Passage represents internal (territorial) waters has been challenged by other countries, especially the U.S., which argue that these waters constitute an international strait (international waters). Canadians were incensed when Americans drove the reinforced oil tanker Manhattan through the Northwest Passage in 1969, followed by the icebreaker Polar Sea in 1985, both without asking for Canadian permission. In 1970, the Canadian government enacted the Arctic Waters Pollution Prevention Act, which asserts Canadian regulatory control over pollution within a 100-nautical-mile (190 km) zone. In response, the Americans in 1970 stated, "We cannot accept the assertion of a Canadian claim that the Arctic waters are internal waters of Canada.... Such acceptance would jeopardize the freedom of navigation essential for United States naval activities worldwide." A compromise was reached in 1988, by an agreement on "Arctic Cooperation," which pledges that voyages of American icebreakers "will be undertaken with the consent of the Government of Canada." However the agreement did not alter either country's basic legal position. Essentially, the Americans agreed to ask for the consent of the Government of Canada without conceding that they were obliged to. In January 2006, David Wilkins, the American ambassador to Canada, said his government opposes Stephen Harper's proposed plan to deploy military icebreakers in the Arctic to detect interlopers and assert Canadian sovereignty over those waters.

Along with other nations in the Arctic Council, Canada, Sweden, Iceland, Norway, Finland, Denmark and Russia, the maritime boundaries in the far north will be decided after countries have completed their submissions, due in 2012. Russia has made an extensive claim based on the Russian position that everything that is an extension of the Lomonosov Ridge should be assigned to Russia. Their submission had been rejected when first submitted by the United Nations in 2001.

In June 2019, the U.S. State Department spokesperson Morgan Ortagus said the US "view Canada’s claim that the waters of the Northwest Passage are internal waters of Canada as inconsistent with international law."

In December 2024, Canada outlined plans to address growing global interest in the Arctic, driven by climate change and geopolitical tensions, including Russia's actions in Ukraine. Recognizing climate change as the central threat, Canada committed to strengthening regional alliances, particularly with the U.S., while enhancing military defenses and asserting sovereignty over the Northwest Passage. It also aimed to resolve territorial disputes with the U.S. and Denmark, revive the Arctic ambassador role, and expand diplomatic ties in Alaska and Greenland. Indigenous leaders, though supportive, stressed the urgent need for better infrastructure in Arctic communities to bolster sovereignty and resilience.

=== Alberta separatism ===
Between April 2025 and January 2026, officials from the Trump administration held several private meetings in Washington with representatives of the Alberta Prosperity Project, an Alberta separatist group. Treasury Secretary Scott Bessent described Alberta as "a natural partner for the U.S." and referred to speculation about a possible referendum on the province's future within Canada. In response, PM Mark Carney and Alberta Premier Danielle Smith said the U.S should respect Canadian sovereignty.

== Views of presidents and prime ministers ==
Presidents and prime ministers typically make formal or informal statements that indicate the diplomatic policy of their administration. Diplomats and journalists at the time—and historians since—dissect the nuances and tone to detect the warmth or coolness of the relationship.

- Prime Minister John A. Macdonald, speaking at the beginning of the 1891 election (fought mostly over Canadian free trade with the United States), arguing against closer trade relations with the U.S. stated "As for myself, my course is clear. A British subject I was born—a British subject I will die. With my utmost effort, with my latest breath, will I oppose the 'veiled treason' which attempts by sordid means and mercenary proffers to lure our people from their allegiance." (February 3, 1891.)

Canada's first Prime Minister also said:

It has been said that the United States Government is a failure. I don't go so far. On the contrary, I consider it a marvelous exhibition of human wisdom. It was as perfect as human wisdom could make it, and under it, the American States greatly prospered until very recently, but being the work of men it had its defects, and it is for us to take advantage by experience, and endeavor to see if we cannot arrive by careful study at such a plan as will avoid the mistakes of our neighbors. In the first place, we know that every individual state was an individual sovereign—that each had its own army and navy and political organization – and when they formed themselves into a confederation, they only gave the central authority certain specific rights about sovereign powers. The dangers that have arisen from this system we will avoid if we can agree upon forming a strong central government—a great Central Legislature—a constitution for a Union which will have all the rights of sovereignty except those that are given to the local governments. Then we shall have taken a great step in advance of the American Republic. (September 12, 1864)

- Prime Minister John Sparrow Thompson, angry at failed trade talks in 1888, privately complained to his wife, Lady Thompson, that "These Yankee politicians are the lowest race of thieves in existence."
- After World War II, years of close military and economic cooperation, President Harry S. Truman said in 1947 that "Canada and the United States have reached the point where we can no longer think of each other as 'foreign' countries."
- President John F. Kennedy told Parliament in Ottawa in May 1961 that "Geography has made us neighbors. History has made us friends. Economics has made us partners. And necessity has made us allies. Those whom nature hath so joined together, let no man put asunder."
- President Lyndon B. Johnson helped open Expo 67 with an upbeat theme, saying, "We of the United States consider ourselves blessed. We have much to give thanks for. But the gift of providence we cherish most is that we were given, as our neighbors on this wonderful continent, the people and the nation of Canada." Remarks at Expo 67, Montreal, May 25, 1967.

Trudeau Washington Press Club speech
Trudeau's famous "sleeping with an elephant" quotation

- Prime Minister Pierre Elliot Trudeau famously said that being America's neighbor "is like sleeping with an elephant. No matter how friendly and even-tempered the beast, if one can call it that, one is affected by every twitch and grunt."
- Prime Minister Pierre Elliot Trudeau, sharply at odds with the U.S. over Cold War policy, warned at a press conference in 1971 that the overwhelming American presence posed "a danger to our national identity from a cultural, economic, and perhaps even military point of view."
- President Richard Nixon, in a speech to Parliament in 1972, was angry at Trudeau and declared that the "special relationship" between Canada and the United States was dead. "It is time for us to recognize", he stated, "that we have very separate identities; that we have significant differences; and that nobody's interests are furthered when these realities are obscured."
- In late 2001, President George W. Bush did not mention Canada during a speech in which he thanked a list of countries who had assisted in responding to the events of September 11, although Canada had provided military, financial, and other support. Ten years later, David Frum, one of President Bush's speechwriters, stated that it was an unintentional omission.
- Prime Minister Stephen Harper, in a statement congratulating Barack Obama on his inauguration, stated that "The United States remains Canada's most important ally, closest friend and largest trading partner, and I look forward to working with President Obama and his administration as we build on this special relationship."
- President Barack Obama, speaking in Ottawa at his first official international visit on February 19, 2009, said, "I love this country. We could not have a better friend and ally."
- President Joe Biden, while addressing Parliament on March 24, 2023, emphasized the strong relationship between the two countries, stating, “Americans and Canadians are two people, two countries, in my view, sharing one heart, a personal connection. No two nations on Earth are bound by such close ties, friendship, family, commerce, and culture." Biden additionally commented on Canada's sports culture, saying, "I have to say, I like your teams except the Leafs." which was met with laughter and applause.

In January 2026, as tensions between the two countries continued, Trump withdrew Canada from participating in the Gaza "Peace Commission".

== Public opinion ==
The Canadian public have historically held a positive view of the United States throughout the 1980s, and 1990s, with favorable views ranging in the high 70% to mid-80% range. In 2013, 64% of Canadians had a favourable view of the U.S. and 81% expressed confidence in then-US president Obama to do the right thing in international matters. According to the same poll, 30% viewed the U.S. negatively..

During the first Trump presidency, a poll in January 2018 showed Canadians' approval of U.S. leadership dropped by over 40 percentage points under Donald Trump, in line with the view of residents of many other U.S. allied and neutral countries. Canadian opinion of the U.S. increased between 2021 and 2024, following an international rebound in the U.S. image abroad following the transition as President of the United States from Donald Trump to Joe Biden, with 61% of Canadians having a favourable opinion of the United States in 2021.

In 2025, following the second inauguration of Donald Trump, as well as the 2025 United States trade war with Canada, a Léger poll found that 27% of Canadians view the U.S. as an enemy country, while 30% of Canadians view the U.S. as an ally. A 2026 Politico poll, 58% of Canadians disagree that the United States is a reliable ally, with 48% of Canadian adults viewing the United States as the biggest threat to peace. According to a 2026 Gallup poll, 80% of Americans have favourable opinions of Canada, while 15% have an unfavourable opinion. This was the lowest on record, as well as down from 89% in 2025. It was largely driven by a drop in favourability of Canada among Republicans, whose favourability of the country dropped from 85% in 2025 to 62% in 2026. According to a 2026 Pew Research Center survey, 19% of Canadians had a favourable view of the United States, while 80% had a negative view. In a July 2026 YouGov poll, 21% of Canadians describe the US as a hostile threat, and a further 28% of Canadians brand the US as generally unfriendly, while only 37% of Canadians view the US as generally a friend and ally or as a friendly rival. The poll also finds that 46% of Canadians view the US's relationship with other countries as being permanently changed, and that things won't go back to normal just because Donald Trump has gone. The poll notes that 20% of Canadians want the US to be their friend and ally, and another 32% of Canadians want to have a positive working relationship with the US, while 32% of Canadians want to keep their distance and not risk getting too close to the US or view the US as a threat to be protected against.

=== Anti-Americanism ===
Anti-Americanism in Canada has unique historical roots. Since the arrival of the Loyalists as refugees from the American Revolution in the 1780s, historians have identified a constant theme of Canadian fear of the United States and of "Americanization" or a cultural takeover. In the War of 1812, for example, the enthusiastic response by French militia to defend Lower Canada reflected, according to Heidler and Heidler (2004), "the fear of Americanization". Scholars have traced this attitude over time in Ontario and Quebec.

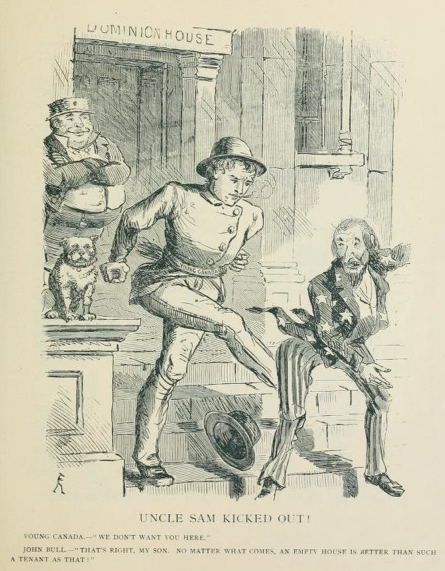
A Canadian political cartoon from 1869 of a "Young Canada" kicking out Uncle Sam from "Dominion House", while John Bull watches in the background

Canadian intellectuals who wrote about the U.S. in the first half of the 20th century identified America as the world center of modernity and deplored it. Anti-American Canadians (who admired the British Empire) explained that Canada had narrowly escaped American conquest with its rejection of tradition, its worship of "progress" and technology, and its mass culture; they explained that Canada was much better because of its commitment to orderly government and societal harmony. There were a few ardent defenders of the nation to the south, notably liberal and socialist intellectuals such as F. R. Scott and Jean-Charles Harvey (1891–1967).

Looking at television, Collins (1990) finds that it is in Anglophone Canada that fear of cultural Americanization is most powerful, for there the attractions of the U.S. are strongest. Meren (2009) argues that after 1945, the emergence of Quebec nationalism and the desire to preserve French-Canadian cultural heritage led to growing anxiety regarding American cultural imperialism and Americanization. In 2006 surveys showed that 60 percent of Québécois had a fear of Americanization, while other surveys showed they preferred their current situation to that of the Americans in the realms of health care, quality of life as seniors, environmental quality, poverty, educational system, racism and standard of living. While agreeing that job opportunities are greater in America, 89 percent disagreed with the notion that they would rather be in the United States, and they were more likely to feel closer to English Canadians than to Americans. However, there is evidence that the elites and Quebec are much less fearful of Americanization and much more open to economic integration than the general public.

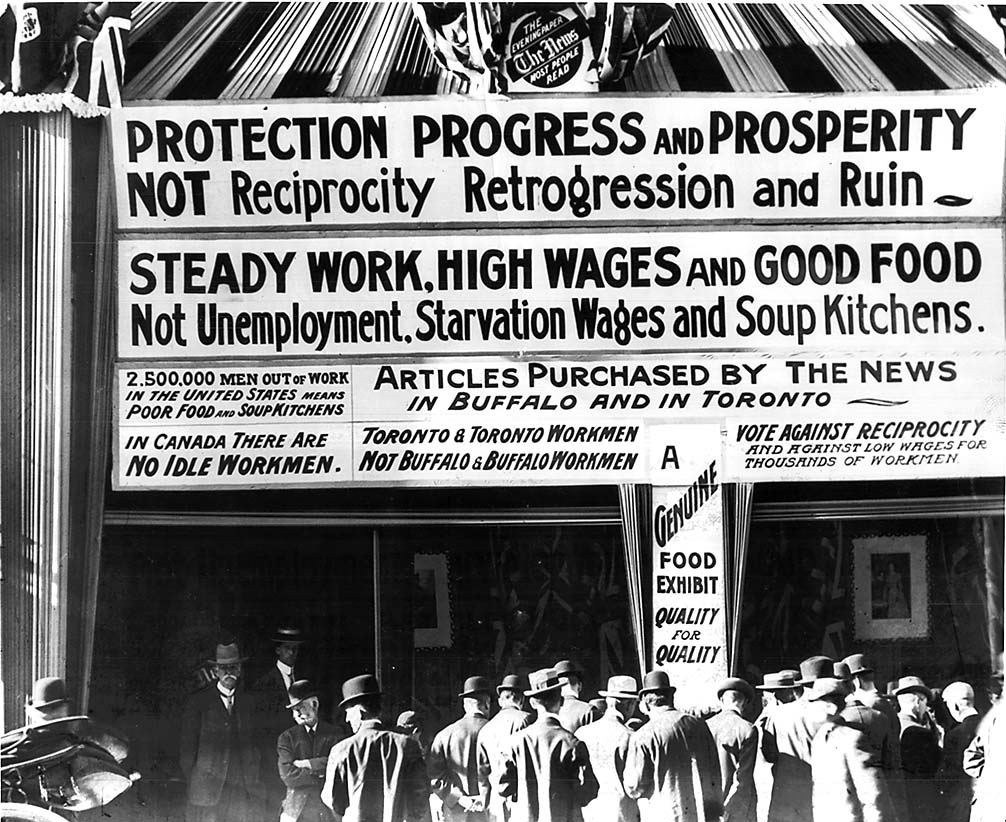
Signage advocating against free trade with the United States on a building in Toronto in 1911

The history has been traced in detail by a leading Canadian historian, J.L. Granatstein, in Yankee Go Home: Canadians and Anti-Americanism (1997). Current studies report that the phenomenon persists. Two scholars report, "Anti-Americanism is alive and well in Canada today, strengthened by, among other things, disputes related to NAFTA, American involvement in the Middle East, and the ever-increasing Americanization of Canadian culture." Jamie Glazov writes, "More than anything else, Diefenbaker became the tragic victim of Canadian anti-Americanism, a sentiment the prime minister had fully embraced by 1962. [He was] unable to imagine himself (or his foreign policy) without enemies." Historian J. M. Bumsted says, "In its most extreme form, Canadian suspicion of the United States has led to outbreaks of overt anti-Americanism, usually spilling over against American residents in Canada." John R. Wennersten writes, "But at the heart of Canadian anti-Americanism lies a cultural bitterness that takes an American expatriate unaware. Canadians fear the American media's influence on their culture and talk critically about how Americans are exporting a culture of violence in their television programming and movies." However Kim Nossal points out that the Canadian variety is much milder than anti-Americanism in some other countries. By contrast, Americans show very little knowledge or interest one way or the other regarding Canadian affairs. Canadian historian Frank Underhill, quoting Canadian playwright Merrill Denison summed it up: "Americans are benevolently ignorant about Canada, whereas Canadians are malevolently informed about the United States."

=== Canadian society's opinion on U.S. presidents ===
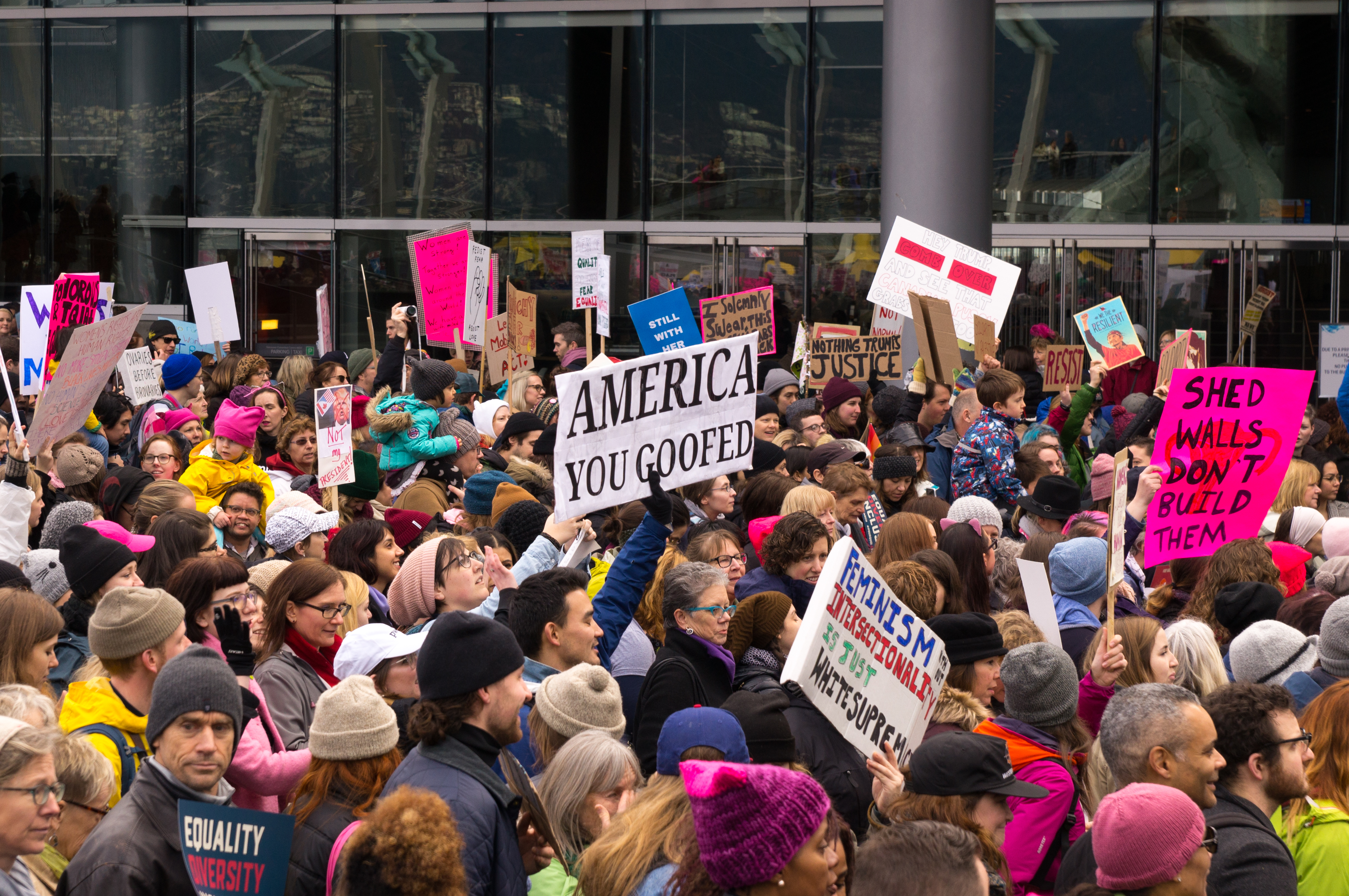
Anti-Trump rally organized in Vancouver in January 2017

United States president George W. Bush was "deeply disliked" by a majority of Canadians according to the Arizona Daily Sun. A 2004 poll found that more than two-thirds of Canadians favored Democrat John Kerry over Bush in the 2004 presidential election, with Bush's lowest approval ratings in Canada being in the province of Quebec where just 11% of the population supported him. Canadian public opinion of Barack Obama was significantly more positive. A 2012 poll found that 65% of Canadians would vote for Obama in the 2012 presidential election "if they could" while only 9% of Canadians would vote for his Republican opponent Mitt Romney. The same study found that 61% of Canadians felt that the Obama administration had been "good" for America, while only 12% felt it had been "bad". Similarly, a Pew Research poll conducted in June 2016 found that 83% of Canadians were "confident in Obama to do the right thing regarding world affairs". The study also found that a majority of members of all three major Canadian political parties supported Obama, and also found that Obama had slightly higher approval ratings in Canada in 2012 than he did in 2008. John Ibbitson of The Globe and Mail stated in 2012 that Canadians generally supported Democratic presidents over Republican presidents, citing how President Richard Nixon was "never liked" in Canada and that Canadians generally did not approve of Prime Minister Brian Mulroney's friendship with President Ronald Reagan.

A November 2016 poll found 82% of Canadians preferred Hillary Clinton over Donald Trump. A January 2017 poll found that 66% of Canadians "disapproved" of Donald Trump, with 23% approving of him and 11% being "unsure". The poll also found that only 18% of Canadians believed Trump's presidency would have a positive impact on Canada, while 63% believed it would have a negative effect. A July 2019 poll found 79% of Canadians preferred Joe Biden or Bernie Sanders over Trump. A Pew Research poll released in June 2021, showed that Canadian opinion of American president Joe Biden is much more favorable than his predecessor Donald Trump, with 77% approving of his leadership and having confidence in him to do the right thing.

Annexation threats by Donald Trump during his second term as U.S. president, as well as the 2025 United States trade war with Canada, have significantly soured public opinion, with a Pollara poll finding that 68% of Canadians are "angry" or "frustrated" at the Trump administration, while a Léger poll found that 74% of Canadians have an unfavourable opinion of Donald Trump. Passenger bookings on Canada to US routes fell by more than 70% in early 2025 compared to the same period in 2024, according to data from aviation analytics firm OAG. According to a Pew Research poll in 2026, 20% of Canadians have confidence in Trump to do the right thing in world affairs, while 79% have no confidence. A July 2026 YouGov poll found that 68% of Canadians view the US under Trump as more of a force for bad and 62% of Canadians view the US under Trump as a less trustworthy ally.

== Residential diplomatic missions ==
of Canada in the United States

- Washington, D.C. (Embassy)
- Atlanta (Consulate-General)
- Boston (Consulate-General)
- Chicago (Consulate-General)
- Dallas (Consulate-General)
- Denver (Consulate-General)
- Detroit (Consulate-General)
- Los Angeles (Consulate-General)
- Miami (Consulate-General)
- Minneapolis (Consulate-General)
- New York City (Consulate-General)
- San Francisco (Consulate-General)
- Seattle (Consulate-General)
- Houston (Trade Office)
- Palo Alto (Trade Office)

of the United States in Canada

- Ottawa (Embassy)
- Calgary (Consulate-General)
- Halifax (Consulate-General)
- Montreal (Consulate-General)
- Quebec City (Consulate-General)
- Toronto (Consulate-General)
- Vancouver (Consulate-General)
- Winnipeg (Consulate)

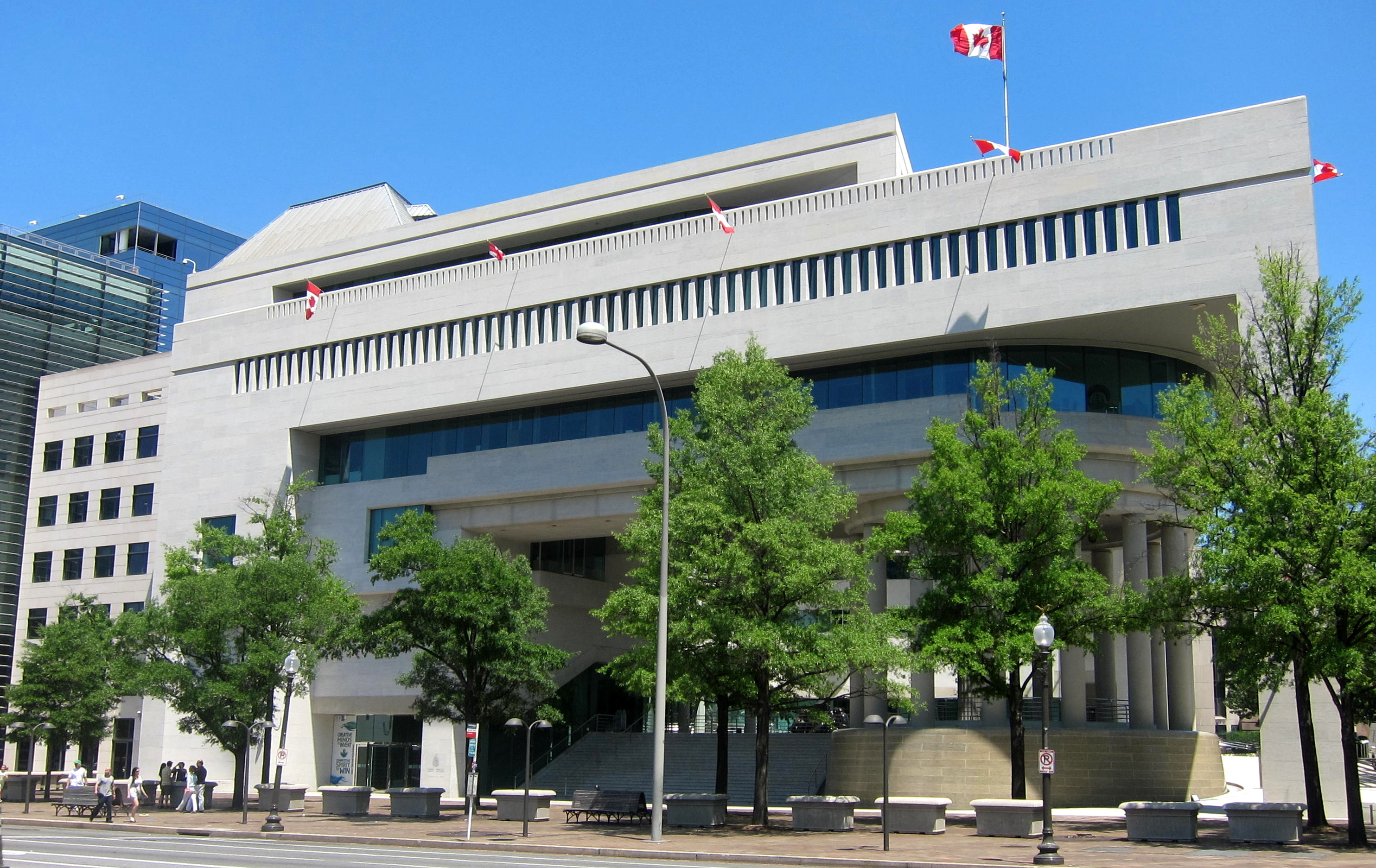
Embassy of Canada in Washington, D.C.
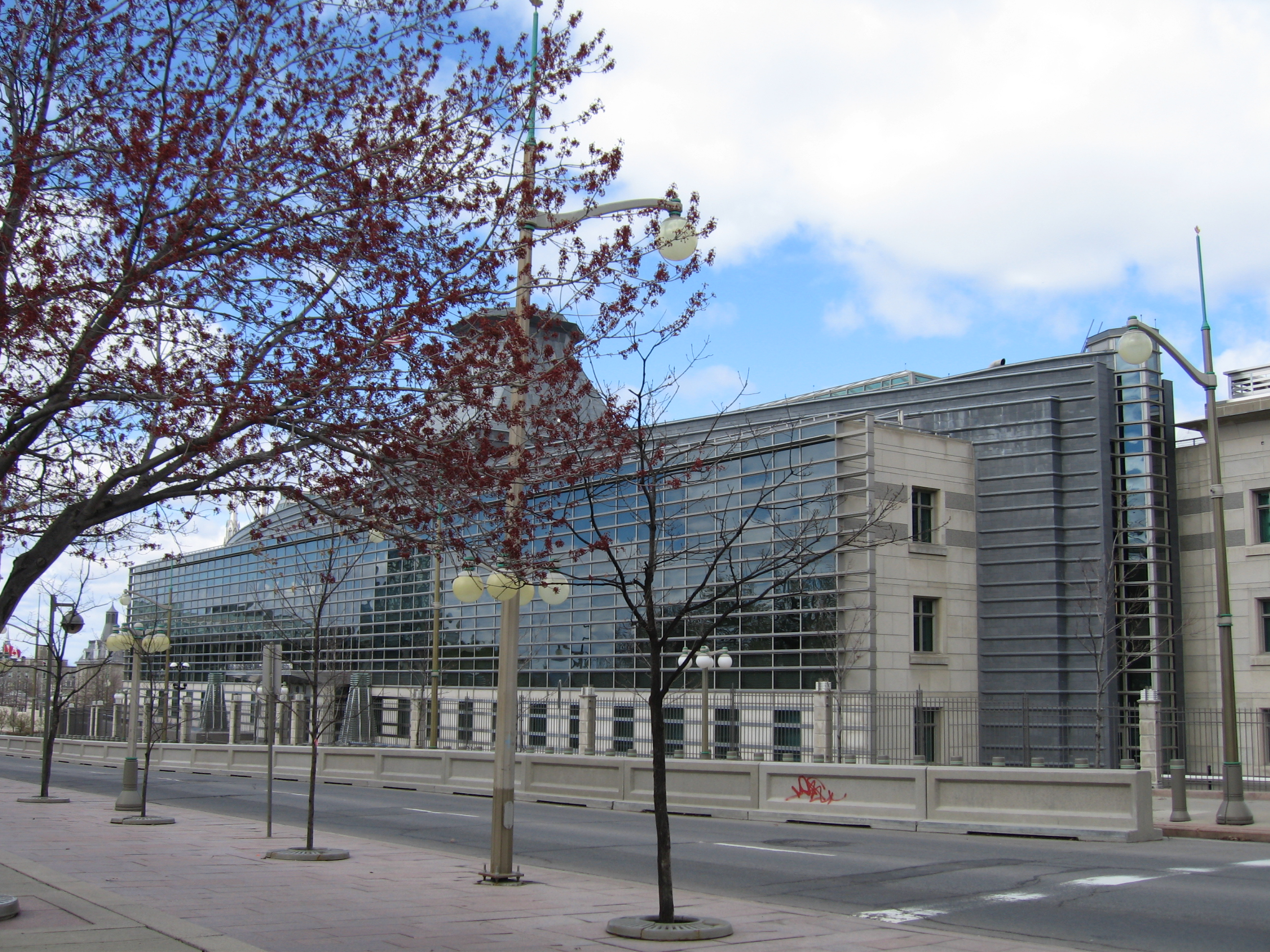
Embassy of the United States in Ottawa

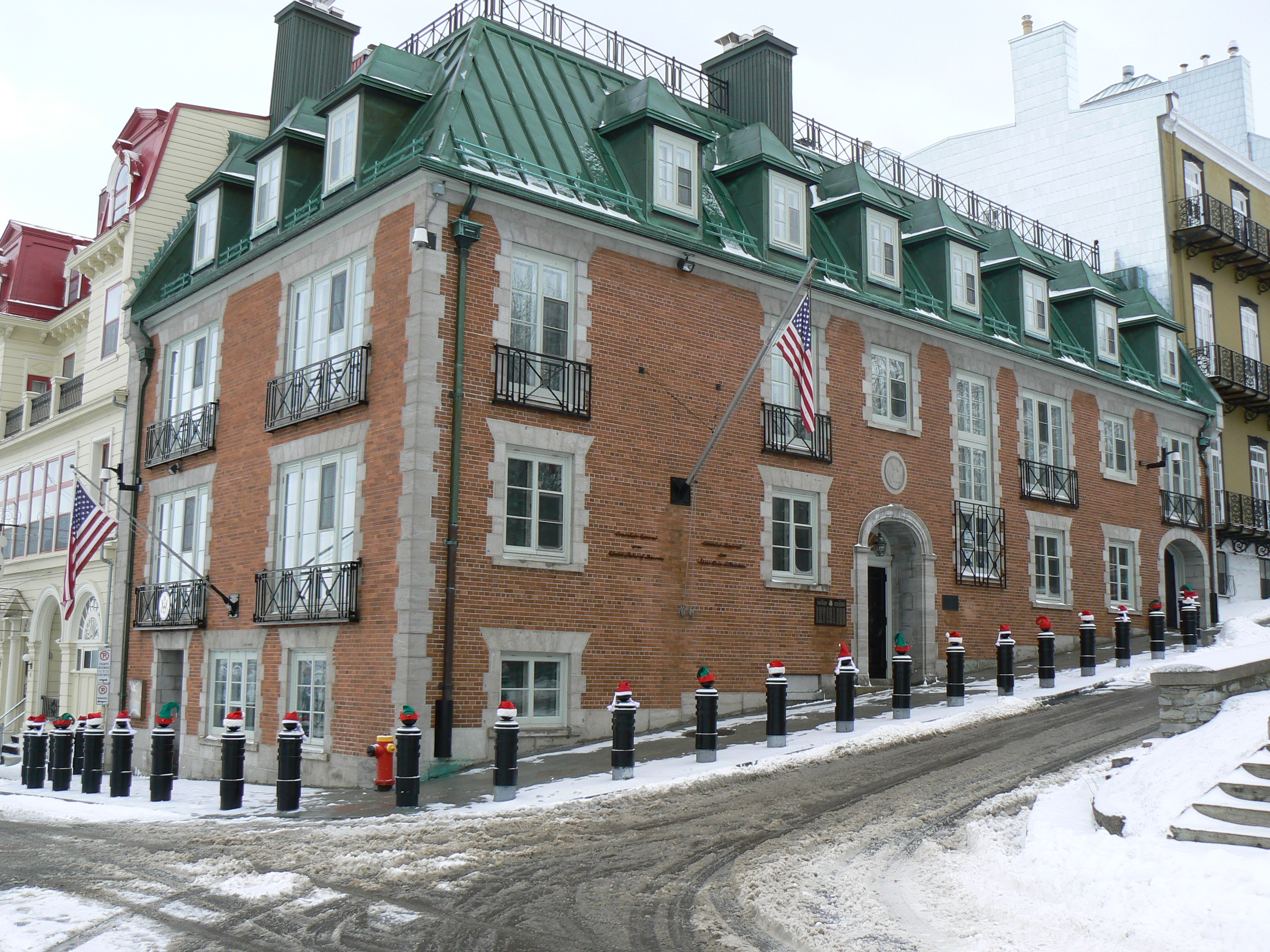
Consulate-General of the United States in Quebec City

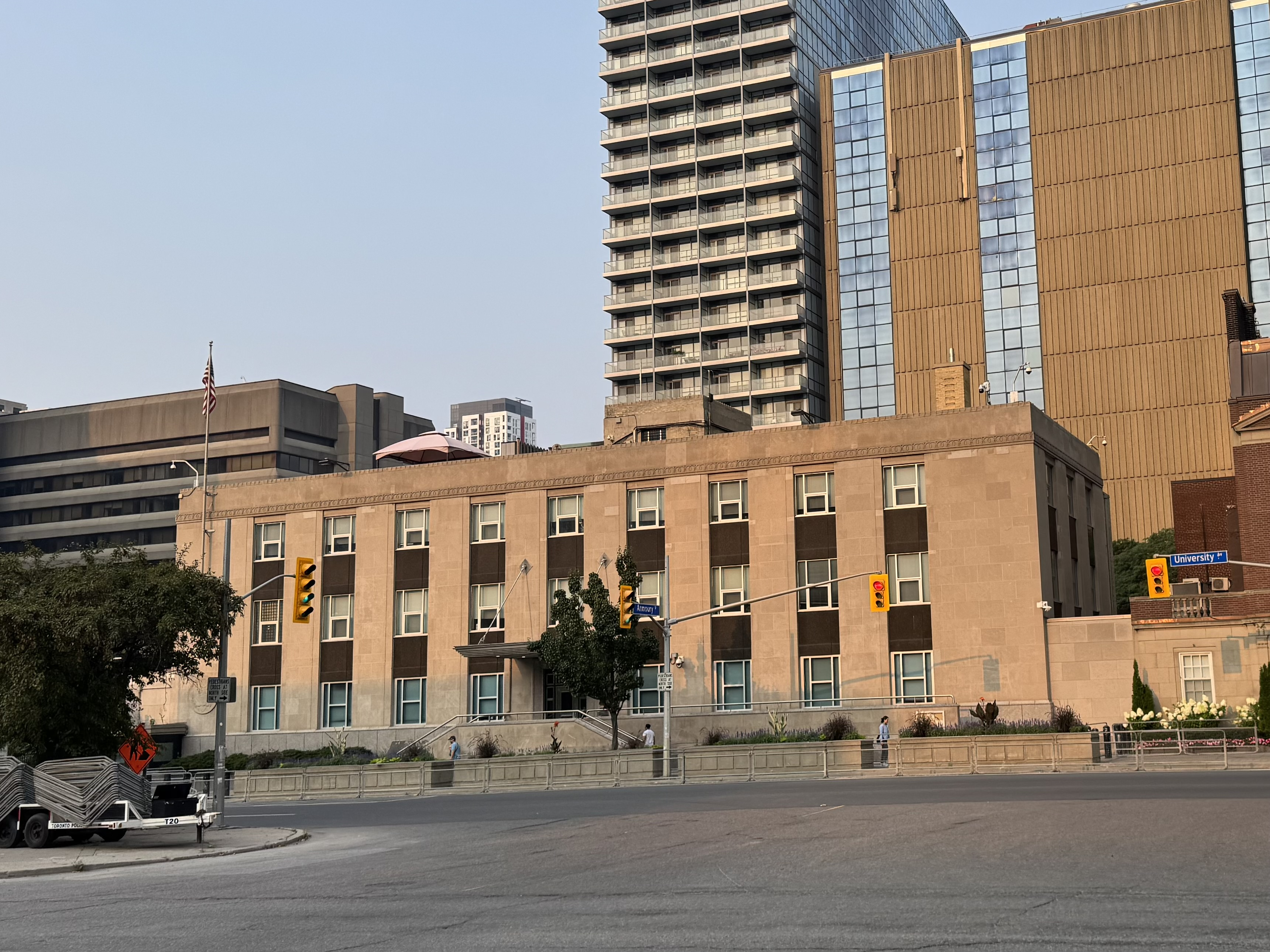
Consulate-General of the United States in Toronto

== See also ==
- Comparison of Canadian and American economies
- Comparison of the Canadian and American healthcare systems
- CIA activities in Canada
- List of ambassadors of Canada to the United States
- List of ambassadors of the United States to Canada
- Movements for the annexation of Canada to the United States
- Security and Prosperity Partnership of North America
