= United States trade war =

United States trade war may refer to:

- 2025–2026 Canada–United States trade war
- 2025–2026 United States trade war with Mexico
- Canada–United States softwood lumber dispute
- China–United States trade war

== See also ==
- Canada–United States trade relations
- Trade war
