= 2025–2026 United States trade war with Canada and Mexico =

From 2025, the United States has engaged in trade wars with Canada and Mexico:

- 2025–2026 Canada–United States trade war
- 2025–2026 Mexico–United States trade war

== See also ==
- Tariffs in the second Trump administration
