= Canada–United States trade relations =

The trade relationship between Canada and the United States is one of the largest in the world. In 2023, the goods and services trade between the two countries totalled US$916 billion with U.S. exports valued at US$440 billion and Canadian exports at US$476 billion, resulting in a United States US$36 billion trade deficit with Canada. In 2024, every day, around 328,000 people and $3.6 billion (US$2.6 billion) in goods and services crossed the Canada–U.S. border resulting in around $1.3 Trillion annually. On February 1, 2025, a trade war started by the United States against Canada as well as Mexico began when the U.S. president Donald Trump signed orders imposing near-universal tariffs on goods from the two countries entering the United States.

Canada has historically held a trade deficit with the United States in every year since 1985 in net trade of goods, excluding services. Canadian politicians have debated protectionism versus free trade since 1866. Trade with the United States was the main topic in the 1911 Canadian Federal Election, where it was proposed by the Liberal Party of Canada and opposed by the Conservative Party, as well as in the 1984 and 1988 Canadian Federal Election, where the Progressive Conservative Party promoted a free trade agreement, opposed by the Liberal Party. A free trade agreement was finally implemented with the Canada–United States Free Trade Agreement in 1987. The trade across Ambassador Bridge, between Windsor, Ontario and Detroit, Michigan, alone is equal to all trade between the United States and Japan.

== History ==
=== Before NAFTA ===
Trade with the United States was the main topic in the 1911 Canadian Federal Election, where it was proposed by the Liberal Party of Canada and opposed by the Conservative Party, as well as in the 1984 and 1988 Canadian Federal Election, where the Progressive Conservative Party promoted a free trade agreement, opposed by the Liberal Party. Although there were many bilateral agreements reducing tariffs, a free trade agreement was not reached until the Canada–United States Free Trade Agreement in 1987.

The Canadian–American Reciprocity Treaty increased trade after 1855. When it ended 1866, Canada turned to tariffs. The National Policy was a Canadian economic program introduced by John A. Macdonald's Conservative Party in 1879 after it returned to power. It was based on high tariffs to protect Canada's manufacturing industry. Macdonald campaigned on the policy in the 1878 election, and handily beat the Liberal Party, which supported free trade.

Efforts to restore free trade with Canada collapsed when Canada rejected a proposed reciprocity treaty in fear of American imperialism in the 1911 federal election. Taft negotiated a reciprocity agreement with Canada, that had the effect of sharply lowering tariffs. Democrats supported the plan but Midwestern Republicans bitterly opposed it. Barnstorming the country for his agreement, Taft undiplomatically pointed to the inevitable integration of the North American economy, and suggested that Canada should come to a "parting of the ways" with Britain. Canada's Conservative Party, under the leadership of Robert Borden, now had an issue to regain power from the low-tariff Liberals. After a surge of pro-imperial anti-Americanism, the Conservatives won.

Ottawa rejected reciprocity, reasserted the National Policy and went to London first for new financial and trade deals. The Payne Aldrich Tariff of 1909 actually changed little and had slight economic impact one way or the other, but the political impact was enormous. The insurgents felt tricked and defeated and swore vengeance against Wall Street and its minions Taft and Aldrich. The insurgency led to a fatal split down the middle in 1912 as the GOP lost its balance wheel.

=== North American Free Trade Agreement (NAFTA) ===
The Canada–United States Free Trade Agreement laid the groundwork for a multilateral and multicultural agreement between the United States, Mexico, and Canada. On January 1, 1994, the North American Free Trade Agreement (NAFTA) came into effect. The agreement has helped to increase trade amongst all three member countries. Although there is some dysfunction between the countries, especially in the area of automobiles and agriculture, the trends are negligible as the agreement has arguably been a boon for all nations involved.

After the September 11 attacks, a debate on whether there should be further North American integration began. Some proposed the adoption of the Amero under the North American Currency Union as the official currency of North America. While these discussions were more prevalent in Canada, studies have shown that United States citizens would not object to economic integration. Former U.S. Ambassador Paul Cellucci stated, however, "Security trumps trade" in the United States, and so as long as Canada is a possible point of entry for terrorists, such integration seems unfeasible.

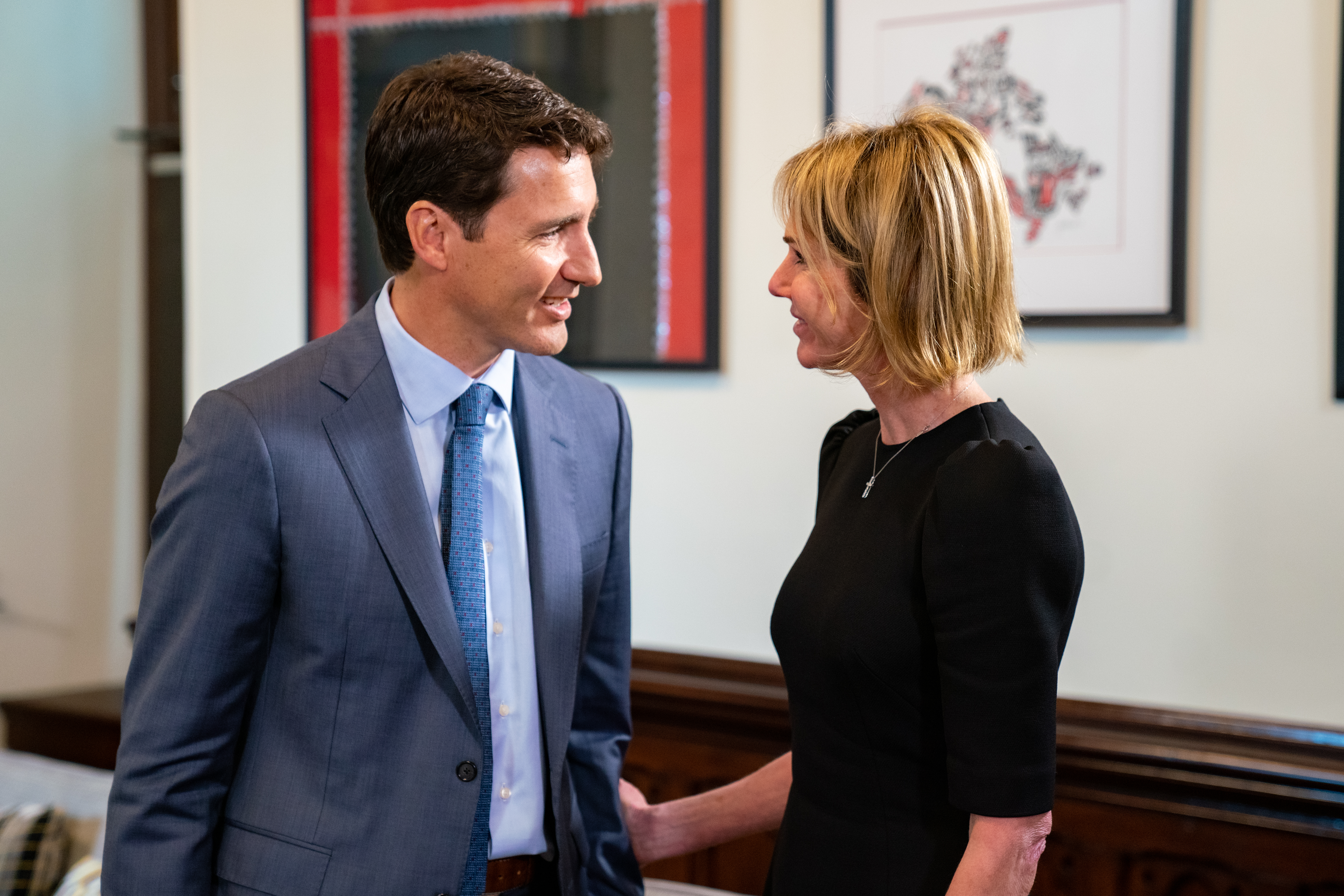
Canadian Prime Minister Justin Trudeau greets U.S. Ambassador Kelly Craft in 2019.

=== Disputes ===
There are several disputes that have arisen from the bilateral trade between the two nations. The United States placed Canada on its Special 301 Report intellectual property rights enforcement (although under the mildest category of "rebuke"). Other products from Canada under dispute include softwood lumber, beef, tomatoes, and other agricultural products.

The heightened border security as a result of the 2001 terrorist attacks has been an issue of concern for businesses in both countries. The issue has become less of a concern since the attacks with the development of new technology, registration, training, and fewer rules. However, a midpoint estimate of US$10.5 billion costs to businesses in delays and uncertain travel time have affected trade.

One ongoing and complex trade issue involves the importation of cheaper prescription drugs from Canada to the United States. Due to the Canadian government's price controls as part of their Single-payer medical system, prices for prescription drugs can be a fraction of the price paid by consumers in the unregulated U.S. market. While laws in the United States have been passed at the national level against such sales, specific state and local governments have passed their own legislation to allow the trade to continue.

==== Softwood lumber ====
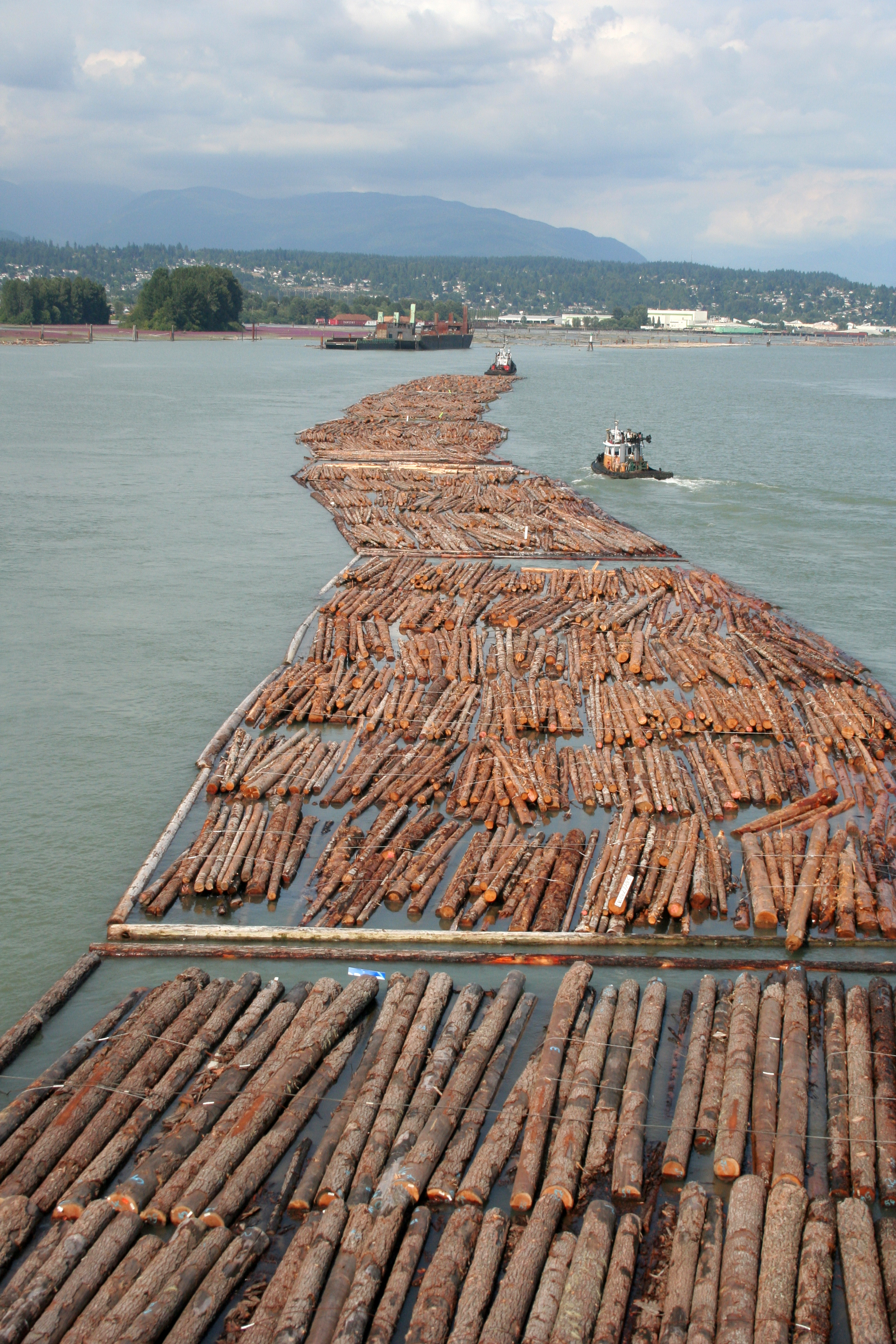
Log driving near Vancouver, British Columbia, Canada

The Canada–United States softwood lumber dispute is one of the most significant and enduring trade disputes in modern history. The dispute has had its biggest effect on British Columbia, the major Canadian exporter of softwood lumber to the United States.

The heart of the dispute is the claim that the Canadian lumber industry is unfairly subsidized by the federal and provincial governments. Specifically, most timber in Canada is owned by provincial governments. The price charged to harvest the timber (the "stumpage fee") is set administratively rather than through a competitive auction, as is often the practice in the United States. The United States claims that the provision of government timber at below market prices constitutes an unfair subsidy. Under U.S. trade remedy laws, foreign goods benefiting from subsidies can be subject to a countervailing duty tariff to offset the subsidy and bring the price of the product back up to market rates.

==== 2025 trade war ====
In 2018 the Trump administration negotiated a new United States–Mexico–Canada Agreement to replace NAFTA. During the second inauguration of Donald Trump, President Trump threatened Canada and Mexico with 25% tariffs across multiple industries.

Due to Trump's tariff threats, Ontario Premier Doug Ford proposed halting US liquor imports. Ford also warned that energy exports to the US will be cut if Trump imposes tariffs. In addition to potentially cutting power to Michigan, New York state, and Minnesota, the Ford government sought to restrict exports of critical Canadian minerals needed for electric vehicle batteries and the supply chain.

On 1 February 2025, President Trump declared a national security emergency under the terms of the International Emergency Economic Powers Act and enacted 25% tariffs on all goods imported from Canada into the United States, excluding energy imports which became subject to a 10% tariff, and suspended the de minimis rule while the emergency is in place. Canada responded by initiating retaliatory 25% tariffs on select goods imported into Canada from the United States. According to the Canadian Chamber of Commerce, Saint John, New Brunswick, followed by Calgary, will be the most impacted cities in Canada as a result of the Trump tariffs.

On 24 October 2025, U.S. President Donald Trump announced the *termination of all trade negotiations with Canada*, stating that ongoing talks between the two countries would not proceed further. The Canadian government responded by expressing regret and noting that the decision followed a series of tariff escalations in 2025. Analysts observe that although the bulk of goods remain covered under the United States–Mexico–Canada Agreement (USMCA) exemptions, the broader suspension of talks signals a significant shift in Canada–U.S. trade relations.

The termination announcement adds to the framework of the wider 2025 trade dispute, which began on 1 February 2025 when the U.S. imposed broad tariffs on Canadian goods and Canada launched retaliatory measures. Observers note that the move raises uncertainty for future bilateral trade policy and bilateral supply-chain integration, especially in sectors such as energy, automotive and agriculture.

In February 2026, the United States House of Representatives voted to repeal tariffs that had been imposed on Canadian goods during Donald Trump's administration. The resolution passed by a 219–211 vote, with a small number of Republican lawmakers joining nearly all Democrats in support. The tariffs had originally been enacted under a national emergency declaration in February 2025, and their repeal represented a rare bipartisan rebuke of Trump's trade policy. Following the vote, President Trump reportedly threatened political consequences for Republicans who voted against the tariff measures. While passage in the House reflects congressional concern over the tariffs, actual repeal would still require Senate approval and presidential assent, and was expected to face a potential veto.

===== Prime Minister's Council on Canada-U.S. Relations =====
In response to the trade tensions, Prime Minister Trudeau announced the Prime Minister's Council on Canada-U.S. Relations in January 2025. Prime Minister Carney updated the council in April 2026. Canada also has a Cabinet committee for Canada-U.S. relations, called the Secure and Sovereign Canada committee. Dominic LeBlanc is the first minister for Canada-U.S. trade.

== By sector ==
=== Energy ===
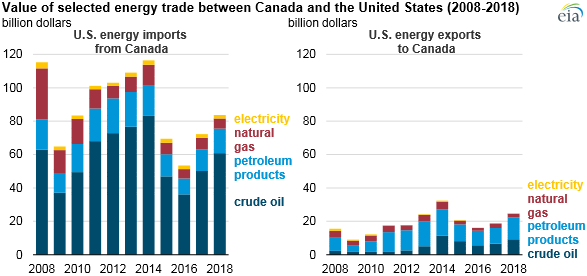
Trade in energy products, 2008–2018

The strength of the Canada–U.S. relationship is demonstrated by impressive bilateral trade of approximately $1.9 billion a day, along the world's longest undefended border. Energy trade is the largest component of this cross-border commerce. Canada has the third-largest oil reserves (after Saudi Arabia and Venezuela), thanks to its oil-sands resources. The United States has historically been Canada's only foreign market for natural gas, oil, and hydropower. In 2010, almost 100% of Canada's exports in these commodity classes were destined for the United States. Canada is the largest foreign supplier of crude oil (25% of oil imports) and natural gas to the United States. In short, this energy relationship has enhanced U.S. energy security and provided Canada with a steady demand for its energy exports.

However, this highly integrated U.S.–Canada energy relationship may change dramatically in the near future. U.S. oil and natural gas production and reserves are expanding because of growing tight oil and shale gas developments. Furthermore, the U.S. Energy Information Administration (EIA) forecasts slower growth in U.S. oil and natural gas consumption in the coming decades until 2035. Consequently, the United States no longer appears to be an unlimited market for Canadian energy, leaving Canada seeking new export destinations.

Both Canada and the United States are increasingly reliant on foreign investment to develop their resource sectors, with Asia serving as an important source of capital. Initially, Asian investors focused on project investments as minority joint venture partners, but they are now showing a growing interest in owning production companies. The objectives of Asian investors for investing in the North American energy sector include seeking attractive financial returns on investment and viewing North America as an energy supply source for their economies. The expanding energy investment and trade between North America and Asia have the potential to be mutually beneficial.

In April 2026, Donald Trump signed an order that authorizes a "Canada-Wyoming crude [oil] pipeline". The pipeline is supposed to go from Canada thru Montana to Wyoming, according to the plans of Bridger, an oil company.

=== Agriculture (Dairy) ===
Another source of tension has been Canada's protection of their dairy farmers. Canada is the only industrialized country in the world to still use a supply management system for regulating the supply of dairy products. The US sees the system as protectionist because after an annual import quota has been reached, a large tariff (240% for milk, 300% for butter) is applied to any additional imports. However, many of these rates were negotiated in the USMCA trade agreement, the US has similar "above-quota" tariffs on imports from Canada, and the quotas are rarely - if ever - reached.

== See also ==
- NAFTA's effect on United States employment
- North American Forum on Integration
- North American SuperCorridor Coalition
- Security and Prosperity Partnership of North America
