= Bridger =

Bridger may refer to:

- Bridger (name)
- Bridger Aerospace, headquartered in Montana, United States
- Bridger Photonics, headquartered in Montana, United States

== Places ==
In the United States:

- Bridger, Montana, town in Carbon County
- Bridger, Gallatin County, Montana, census-designated place
  - Bridger Bowl Ski Area
- Bridger, South Dakota, census-designated place
- Fort Bridger, Wyoming, census-designated place
- Bridger Mountains (Wyoming)
- Bridger Range (Montana)
- Bridger Trail, emigration trail in Wyoming
- Bridger Wilderness, in the Wind River Range, Wyoming
- Bridger–Teton National Forest, Wyoming

== Other uses ==
- Operation Bridger, a nationwide police protective security operation for Members of Parliament in the United Kingdom
