= 2025–2026 Canada–United States trade war =

Ongoing economic conflict

- Part of the Tariffs in the second Trump administration
- Date: February 1, 2025 – present (1 year, 9 months, 2 weeks and 1 day)
- Location: Canada; United States
- Status: Ongoing

Parties
| United States | Canada |

Lead figures
| (United States) Donald Trump; (United States) Howard Lutnick; (United States) Peter Navarro; (United States) Jamieson Greer; (United States) Scott Bessent | (Canada) Justin Trudeau; (Canada) Mark Carney; (Canada) Dominic LeBlanc; (Canada) Mélanie Joly; (Canada) Janice Charette; (Canada) François-Philippe Champagne; (Ontario) Doug Ford |

On February 1, 2025, a trade war started by the United States against Canada as well as Mexico began when U.S. president Donald Trump signed orders imposing near-universal tariffs on goods from the two countries entering the United States. The order called for 25 percent tariffs on all imports from Canada except for oil and energy, which would be taxed at 10 percent.

In response, then–Canadian prime minister Justin Trudeau said Canada would retaliate with 25 percent tariffs on CA$30 billion (US$20.6 billion) of American goods, which would expand to CA$155 billion (US$106 billion) after three weeks. On February 3, one day before they were set to take effect, both leaders negotiated a one-month delay of the imposition of the tariffs.

The U.S. tariffs took effect on March 4; Canada's retaliatory tariffs began simultaneously. On March 6, Trump exempted goods compliant with the United States–Mexico–Canada Agreement (USMCA) from tariffs. Later, the U.S. imposed universal tariffs on steel, aluminum, and automotive imports, including those from Mexico and Canada. Due to the USMCA exemption, as of August 2025, over 85% of Canada-U.S. trade and 84% of Mexico-U.S. trade remains tariff-free.

Trump has said the tariffs are intended to reduce the U.S.'s trade deficit with Canada, force Canada to secure their borders with the U.S. against illegal immigration and fentanyl smuggling, and promote domestic manufacturing in the United States. Trudeau and Trudeau's successor, Mark Carney, have called the U.S. tariffs unjustified and stated that they violate the USMCA. Trudeau said that Trump intended to use tariffs to force Canadian annexation into the United States, pointing to Trump's repeated public suggestions that Canada become the "51st state". Economists have said tariffs would likely disrupt trade between the three countries, upending supply chains and increasing consumer prices. In February 2026, the U.S. Supreme Court struck down the tariffs the Trump administration implemented on imports from Canada and Mexico under the International Emergency Economic Powers Act in Learning Resources, Inc. v. Trump. A 2026 Ipsos poll for Global News found that 53% of Canadians favour waiting until Donald Trump leaves office before signing a new trade deal. Support for waiting was highest amongst Albertans at 62% and British Columbians at 59%.

== Background ==
=== United States–Canada trade ===
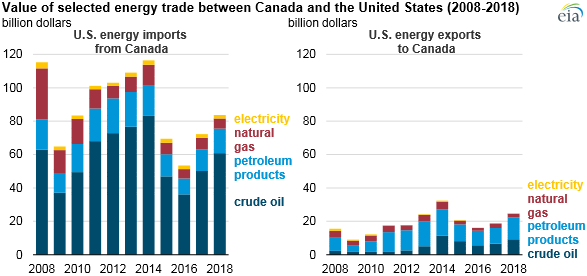
Trade in energy products, 2008–2018

The bilateral trade relationship between the United States and Canada is one of the world's largest. Canada-U.S. trade comprises about one third of Canada's economy, and about 3 percent of the United States's economy. In the first nine months of 2024, Canadian government data estimated that CA$800 billion (US$550 billion) of goods crossed the Canada-U.S. border. More than 70 percent of Canadian exports go to the United States. The countries' energy and automotive markets are both highly integrated, and Canada is the U.S.'s largest supplier of both steel and aluminum. As of November 2024, the U.S. government estimated the United States's trade deficit with Canada to be US$55 billion. This deficit is primarily driven by American demand for Canadian oil; when oil exports are excluded, the U.S. has a trade surplus with Canada. Roughly 60 percent of oil imported by the U.S. is sourced from Canada, and Canada is the largest supplier of U.S. energy imports and second-largest recipient of U.S. energy exports. The increased value of U.S. imports from Canada is partially a result of the Russian invasion of Ukraine in 2022, which created global market instability and raised energy prices. Cars, trucks, other vehicles, and auto parts constitute 27 percent of Canadian exports to the United States. Canada is the second-largest source of automobile parts imported to the United States.

=== Trade agreements ===
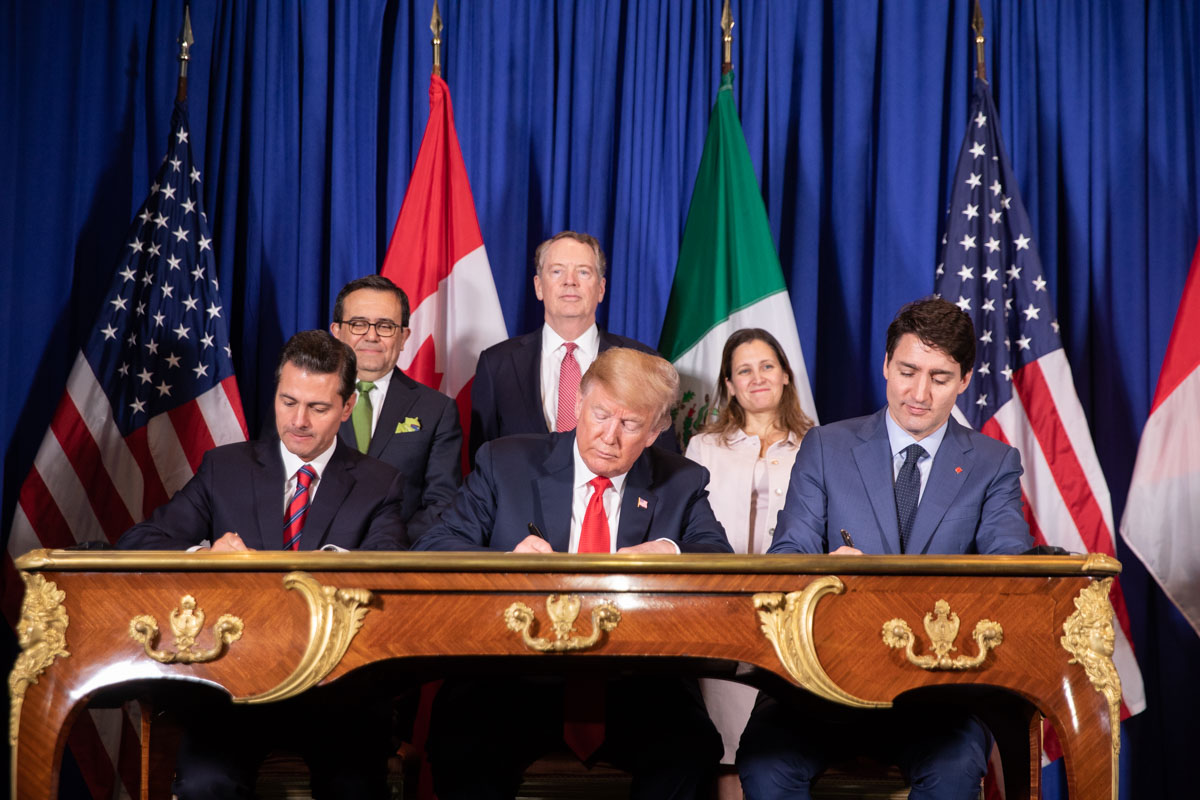
Enrique Peña Nieto, Donald Trump, and Justin Trudeau signing the United States–Mexico–Canada Agreement in 2018

In 1994, the United States, Canada, and Mexico signed the North American Free Trade Agreement (NAFTA), a free trade agreement that eliminated almost all tariffs on trade between the three countries. (Note: Canada and the United States signed an earlier bilateral free trade agreement in 1988.) NAFTA has been described as a source of political division. In the U.S., it caused offshoring as U.S. companies relocated their businesses to Mexico for cheaper labor, harming American factory towns and workers. The backlash against free trade allowed candidates like Donald Trump, who supported protectionist policies, to rise to prominence in U.S. politics. However, many parts of the U.S. benefited from NAFTA's increased trade and economic activity. In 2020, during Trump's first term as U.S. president, NAFTA was replaced by the United States–Mexico–Canada Agreement (USMCA), primarily because Trump disagreed with NAFTA. Changes between NAFTA and the USMCA were largely cosmetic; the new agreement maintained zero tariffs on most products traded across the three countries, but allowed some tariffs to be imposed for national security matters. The region covered by USMCA is one of the world's largest free trade zones.

=== First Trump administration ===
During his first term, Trump threatened tariffs on Mexico if it did not end illegal immigration to the United States across the U.S.-Mexico border and repeatedly threatened to withdraw from NAFTA. However, he ultimately did not impose tariffs on Mexico after it agreed to create the Mexican National Guard, send 6,000 troops to fight illegal immigration, and allowed the U.S. to expand its "remain in Mexico" policy, which forced certain asylum seekers to stay in Mexico until the U.S. processed their asylum claim. Trump pressured Canada and Mexico to renegotiate NAFTA by threatening aggressive import tariffs, and in May 2018, he extended the U.S.'s global tariffs on steel and aluminum to the two countries, inviting them both to retaliate. The three countries agreed to lift the steel and aluminum tariffs in May 2019, one year after they had begun, prior to the USMCA taking effect on July 1, 2020. One month after the USMCA entered force, Trump said that aluminum imports constituted a national security threat that endangered U.S. producers and imposed 10 percent tariffs on Canadian aluminum. Trump ended the tariffs the next month ahead of Canada's planned retaliation.

In 2018 and 2019, Trump also placed major tariffs on China, totaling about US$80 billion of tariffs on about US$380 billion of products, which were largely kept in place by the subsequent administration of Joe Biden. The U.S. government has been concerned over China–Mexico trade, particularly in the automotive sector, because it fears that Chinese companies can use Mexico to export to the United States, circumventing tariffs on China and taking advantage of the USMCA. From October 2023 to October 2024, U.S. authorities apprehended 23,000 people illegally crossing across its northern border from Canada and 1.5 million people illegally crossing its southern border from Mexico.

=== Canadian politics ===
Trump's 2024 presidential campaign outlined an economic strategy that emphasized the use of tariffs to fund proposed tax cuts and encourage domestic manufacturing in the United States. In November 2024, after winning the U.S. presidential election, Trump threatened 25 percent tariffs on all products from Canada and Mexico, which he said would "remain in effect until such time as drugs, in particular fentanyl, and all illegal aliens stop this invasion of our country." Shortly after, Canadian prime minister Justin Trudeau—who has a contentious relationship with Trump—traveled to Trump's estate in Florida to speak with him and discuss the tariffs, as well as illegal immigration and drug smuggling across the Canada-U.S. border. On December 16, Canada announced a plan to spend CA$1.3 billion (US$913 million) on border security to alleviate Trump's concerns. The plan included the creation of a joint U.S.-Canada "strike force" intended to combat transnational crime.

On January 6, 2025, Trudeau declared his intention to resign as Liberal Party leader and prime minister after the election of a new leader on March 9. Doug Ford, the premier of Ontario and head of the Council of the Federation, called a snap provincial election to be held on February 27, saying that he wanted his Progressive Conservative Party of Ontario to have a stronger mandate to oppose Trump's impending tariffs on Canada. On January 31, Trudeau stated on social media that Canada was "ready with a forceful and immediate response" if the U.S. proceeded with its decision to impose tariffs on Canadian exports.

=== Second Trump administration ===
During his inaugural address on January 20, 2025, at the beginning of his second term, Trump said he would enact steep tariffs on other countries. He said that "Instead of taxing our citizens to enrich other countries", the U.S. would "tariff and tax foreign countries to enrich our citizens". Trump said that both Canada and Mexico are allowing "mass numbers of people to come in and fentanyl to come in" to the U.S. across their borders. Approximately 0.2 percent of fentanyl entering the U.S. comes from Canada, while 98 percent comes from Mexico. Trump also said both countries were unfairly profiting from the United States's trade deficits. He has criticized the United States's trade deficit with Canada while citing inaccurate figures that claim it to be as much as US$200 billion.

Even after Trump declared his intention to impose imminent tariffs on Canada and Mexico, U.S. companies did not make a concerted effort to import large quantities of goods to the United States before their enactment.

Trump also made repeated calls for Canada to be annexed by the United States as its "51st state", and said that while he would not use military coercion, he could use "economic force" to bring about Canadian annexation. Since the trade war began, Trudeau has said that Trump's comments should be taken as a serious threat against Canadian sovereignty and that Trump seeks to control Canada to access its mineral resources. In an interview, Trump said that his suggestions to annex Canada were serious, and argued that the U.S. trade deficit with Canada was "essentially a subsidy" and that Canada would be "much better off" in the United States. Trump has argued that Canadian statehood would make tariffs "totally disappear", lower Canadian taxes, and make the country more secure militarily, and called the Canada-U.S. border an "artificial line that looks like it was done with a ruler". Trudeau has said that Canadian annexation is "never going to happen".

== Course of the trade war ==
=== Initial tariff threats (February 1–3, 2025) ===
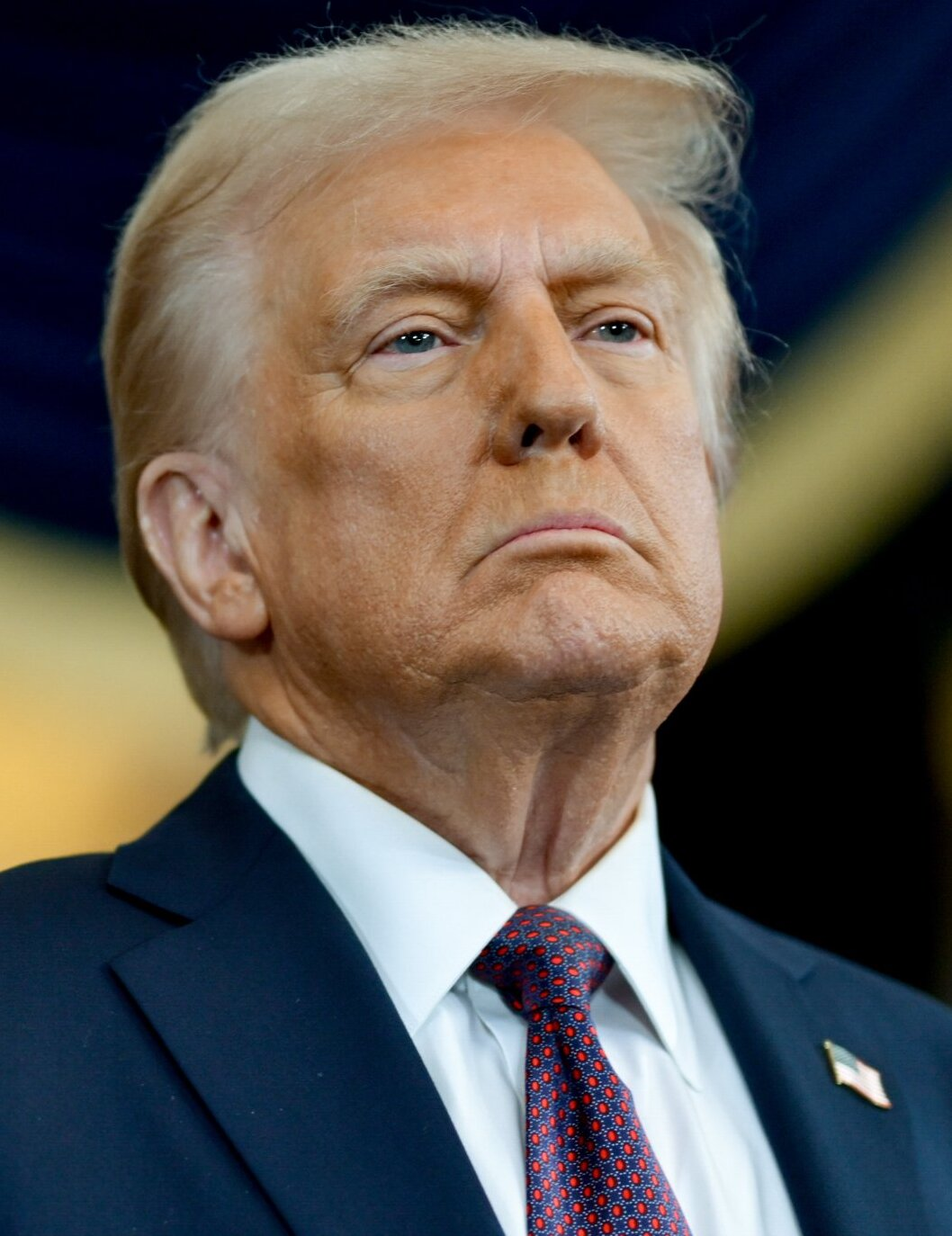
United States president Donald Trump on the day of his second inauguration in 2025

On February 1, 2025, Trump signed three executive orders imposing 25 percent tariffs on all goods from Mexico and Canada except for Canadian oil and energy exports, which received a 10 percent tariff. Mexican energy exports will be subject to the full 25 percent tariff. The orders were issued under the International Emergency Economic Powers Act (IEEPA) and were set to take effect at 12:01 a.m. Eastern Standard Time on February 4. Trump also ordered 10 percent tariffs on China, which would be imposed in addition to the existing tariffs of up to 25 percent on many Chinese goods. The orders included a clause allowing the U.S. to increase its tariffs if the countries respond with their own tariffs or other retaliatory measures.

Trump used the IEEPA—a 1977 U.S. law giving the president broad financial power during declared national emergencies—to circumvent the USMCA's tariff restriction for reasons other than national security, marking the first time the law was used to impose tariffs. Trump cited both the influx of illegal immigrants crossing the United States's borders with both Mexico and Canada, as well as the opioid epidemic in the United States fueled by fentanyl originating in China reaching the U.S. through Mexico and Canada. In the executive order, he said that Canada has played a "central role" in allowing fentanyl to enter the U.S. and that it has failed to "devote sufficient attention and resources or meaningfully coordinate" with the U.S. to "stem the tide of illicit drugs," despite the vast majority of fentanyl in the U.S. coming from the southern border with Mexico. The tariffs are also aimed at forcing manufacturers to hire Americans to make their products in the U.S. instead of importing them from other countries. In later remarks, Trump repeated his hope for Canada to be annexed by the United States, and said that it could do so to avoid tariffs.

According to Bloomberg News, Trump advisors Peter Navarro and Stephen Miller were the leading officials in the economic discussions regarding the imposition of tariffs. At the same time, China was included at the urging of the National Security Council. In a post on Truth Social, Trump said: "We need to protect Americans, and it is my duty as president to ensure the safety of all. I made a promise on my campaign to stop the flood of illegal aliens and drugs from pouring across our borders, and Americans overwhelmingly voted in favor of it." While he acknowledged that the tariffs could cause "temporary short-term disruption," he said that they needed to be imposed. Trump also claimed that "Tariffs don't cause inflation" but rather that "They cause success."

==== Canadian response ====
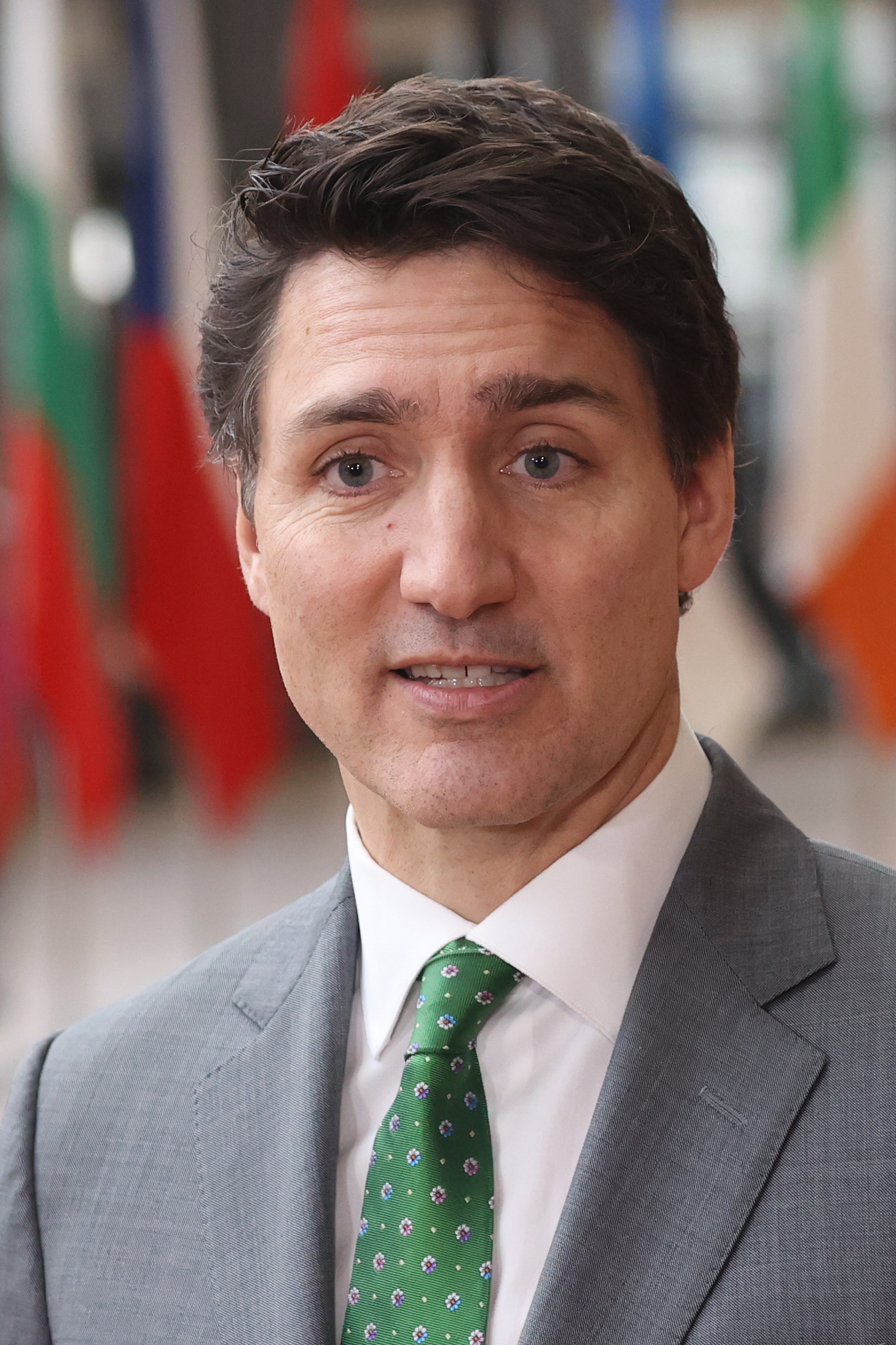
Former Canadian prime minister Justin Trudeau

Hours after Trump imposed the tariffs on February 1, Trudeau said that Canada would retaliate against the United States with tariffs. He said that Canada would impose 25 percent tariffs on CA$30 billion (US$20.6 billion) of American exports immediately after the U.S. tariffs take effect and impose 25 percent tariffs on a further CA$125 billion (US$86 billion) worth of goods in the next three weeks. Trudeau said that the delay would allow Canadian businesses to prepare. He added that Canada was considering more retaliatory trade actions in addition to tariffs to force Trump to end the trade war, including export restrictions on critical minerals and energy products, or a ban on American companies bidding on government contracts.

Trudeau stated that American liquor, vegetables, clothing, shoes, and perfume would be among the first products to face retaliatory tariffs, and that tariffs would also be imposed on consumer goods such as household appliances, furniture, and sports equipment. Canada's retaliation is aimed mainly at "red states" of the U.S., led by Trump's Republican Party. In his speech, Trudeau presented data showing that only about 1 percent of fentanyl imports and illegal border crossings to the United States come from its border with Canada. He called the U.S.-Canada relationship "the most successful partnership the world has ever seen" across all domains and accused Trump's tariffs of violating the USMCA. He also stated that the tariffs pose a threat to American consumers and industries, urging Canadians to "choose Canadian products and services rather than American ones" whenever possible. Trudeau stated: "This is a choice that, yes, will harm Canadians, but beyond that, it will have real consequences for you, the American people. As I have consistently said, tariffs against Canada will put your jobs at risk, potentially shutting down American auto assembly plants and other manufacturing facilities."

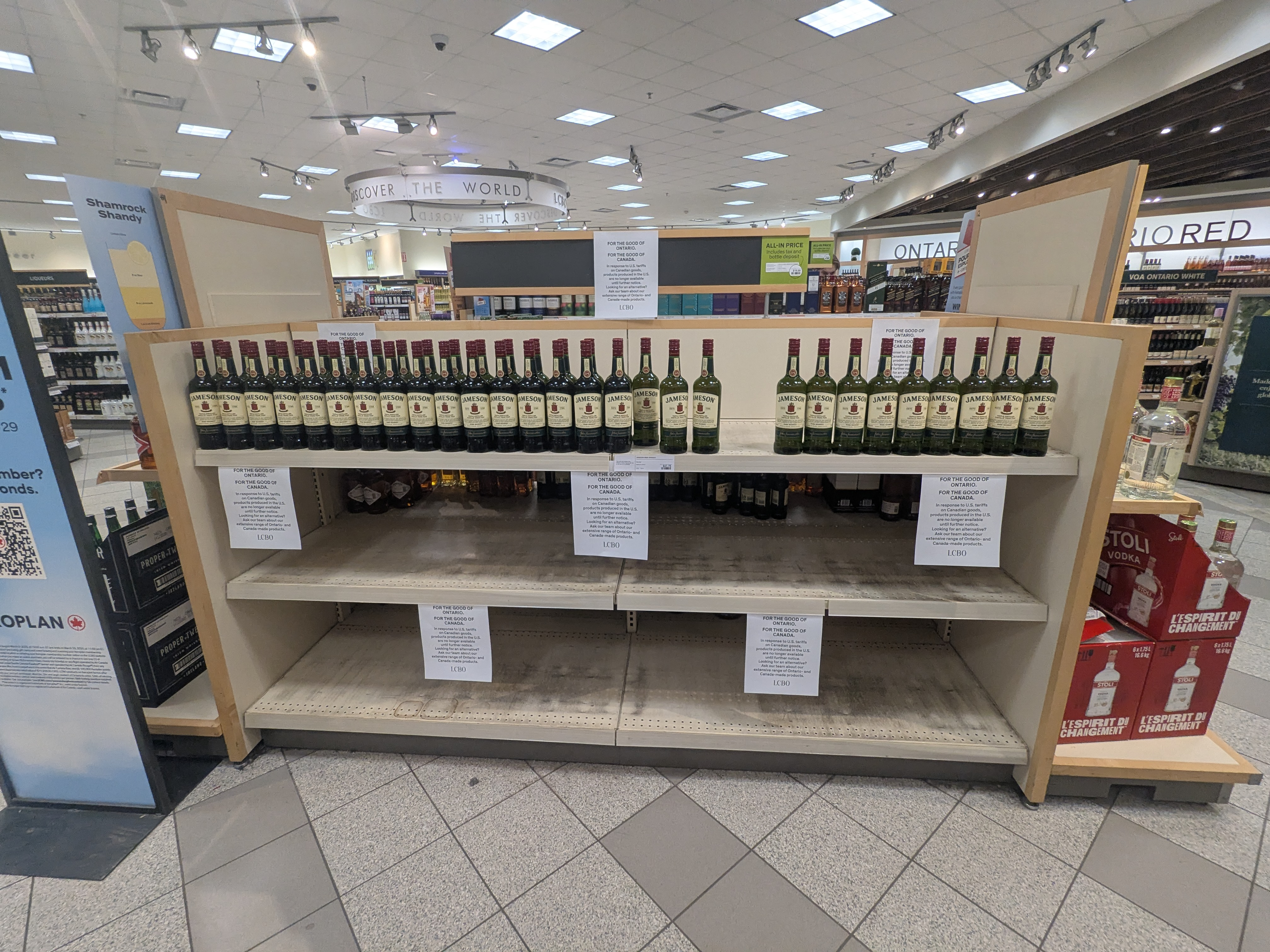
A liquor store shelf in Ontario with all American products removed in March 2025

Canada's premiers also responded. Ontario premier Ford said that Canada has "no choice but to hit back and hit back hard" and ordered the Liquor Control Board of Ontario to end sales of American alcohol. The Premier of Alberta Danielle Smith, who had until then been opposed to aggressive trade action against the United States, said Canada needed to respond to Trump's "mutually destructive policy" and that she supported "the strategic use" of tariffs on U.S. goods "that are more easily purchased from Canada and non-U.S. suppliers". Premier François Legault of Quebec said he ordered Treasury Board president Sonia LeBel to "review all procurement contracts involving American suppliers" and penalize any that do business with Quebec's government. He also directed the Société des alcools du Québec to remove all American products from its shelves. Around Christmas time in 2025, multiple Canadian provinces including Nova Scotia and Manitoba announced they would sell shelved American liquor products being kept in storage with profits going to charitable organizations. No new liquor was purchased for these fundraisers.

In Nova Scotia, Premier Tim Houston said the province will double highway tolls for U.S. vehicles and direct the Nova Scotia Liquor Corporation to stop selling all U.S. liquor by February 4. Northwest Territories premier R.J. Simpson also announced that his government would review its procurement policies to eliminate purchases from U.S. companies where possible. Premier Wab Kinew of Manitoba and Premier Dennis King of Prince Edward Island both said that their provinces would stop importing American liquor, while British Columbia premier David Eby said the BC Liquor Distribution Branch would halt liquor purchases from Republican-led states. On March 10, this was then expanded to ban all U.S. alcohol. Legislation is also planned on being introduced that would tariff U.S. vehicles driving to Alaska through the province. Yukon premier Ranj Pillai said his territory's government would halt orders of U.S. alcohol, review its contracts with U.S. companies, and consider tolls on U.S. vehicles, but later said the measures would be put on hold until tariffs came into effect.

Pierre Poilievre, the leader of the opposition Conservative Party, condemned what he called "massive, unjust and unjustified tariffs". He urged that the government end the current prorogation of parliament to retaliate with measures including dollar-for-dollar tariffs on U.S. goods that he said would raise money to help "affected workers and businesses". He also repeated his demand for a "massive" tax cut and other efforts to bolster the economy.

=== One-month delay (February 3 – March 3, 2025) ===
Trump spoke to Trudeau on the phone on February 3. During their call, he introduced concerns that Canada was not allowing U.S. banks to "open or do business there"; Canada allows American banks to operate commercially in the country but had restricted personal banking to protect its citizens from bank failure. The Canadian Bankers Association said that 16 U.S.-based bank subsidiaries and branches with around CA$113 billion (US$78.6 billion) in assets are currently operating in Canada. After a second call that afternoon, Trump and Trudeau successfully negotiated a one-month delay on the tariffs.

Officials present for the call told The New York Times and the Toronto Star that in addition to concerns over banking, Trump also relayed grievances over Canada's protection of its dairy sector and Canadian consumption taxes that Trump said make American goods more expensive. Trump also said that the 1908 treaty between the United States and the United Kingdom that established the 49th parallel as the border between the U.S. and the dominion of Canada was invalid and that he wanted to revise it. Trudeau and his aides then scrambled to "google" the treaty, after which Trudeau told Trump that it had been superseded by the Canadian Constitution of 1982 and that the patriation of Canada from Britain under the premiership of Trudeau's father Pierre Elliott Trudeau had established Canada's full sovereignty over its territory.

Trump also mentioned during the call that he wanted to revisit the numerous treaties regulating the sharing of lakes and rivers between the U.S. and Canada. In addition, he raised Canada's level of defense spending, and questioned whether Canada does "anything" to contribute to the North American Aerospace Defense Command (NORAD), the joint U.S.-Canada air defense command that operates across North America.

Trudeau told Trump that Canada would appoint a "fentanyl czar", list Mexican drug cartels as terrorists, create an intelligence directive targeting fentanyl and organized crime supported by CA$200 million (US$140 million) in funding, and implement its CA$1.3 billion (US$913 million) border program and establish a Canada-U.S. joint strike force to combat organized crime, fentanyl, and money laundering. Trudeau also assured Trump that 10,000 personnel "are and will be" working on border security in Canada. In response, Trump issued an updated executive order changing the start date of the tariffs to March 4 at 12:01 a.m. Eastern Time. Trump wrote on social media after the call that he was "very pleased with this initial outcome" and the tariffs had been delayed "to see whether or not a final economic deal with Canada can be structured". On February 11, Canada appointed Kevin Brosseau, a former deputy national security advisor to Trudeau and former Royal Canadian Mounted Police senior, as the fentanyl czar.

After the call between Trump and Trudeau on February 3, Howard Lutnick, the incoming U.S. secretary of commerce called Dominic LeBlanc, the Canadian finance minister, who he had been communicating regularly since December 2024. Lutnick said that Trump had realized the U.S.-Canada relationship was governed by a series of agreements that could be quickly abandoned. He said Trump was interested in dissolving arrangements related to sharing and managing the Great Lakes, and reviewing military cooperation between the two countries, including NORAD. Lutnick also said Trump wanted to remove Canada from the Five Eyes, an intelligence-sharing alliance between the U.S., Canada, United Kingdom, Australia, and New Zealand; the Financial Times reported that some officials in Trump's administration have sought to remove Canada from the alliance.

Marco Rubio, the U.S. secretary of state, dismissed that the U.S. was reconsidering military cooperation with Canada. However, Canadian officials, despite initially believing Trump's suggestion of annexing Canada into the United States to be a joke, began to interpret it as a serious threat.

==== Subsequent tariff threats ====
On February 10, 2025, Trump imposed 25 percent tariffs on steel and aluminum entering the United States from all countries, including Canada and Mexico, which provide most of the U.S.'s metal imports. The steel and aluminum tariffs are set to enter force on March 12. Trump said those tariffs were "the first of many", and that over the next four weeks, he would discuss tariffs on cars, pharmaceuticals, chips, and other goods with his team. In response, Trudeau called the tariffs "unacceptable" and said he hoped talks with the Trump administration would resolve the issue, but that Canada will have a "firm and clear" response if needed. Shares of U.S. steelmakers rose in response to Trump's order, while prices for steel and aluminum rose.

=== Imposition of tariffs (March 2025) ===
On March 3, Trump said that the tariffs that were delayed from February would take effect as planned on March 4, and that there was "no room left" for Canada or Mexico to negotiate a last-minute deal with the United States to delay them further. Lutnick said that both Canada and Mexico had made progress on improving border security, but that neither had satisfied the U.S.'s demands to halt the flow of fentanyl into the United States. Canadian foreign minister Mélanie Joly said that Canada was prepared to respond, while Sheinbaum reaffirmed that Mexico's prior response plans would take effect when Trump's tariffs were imposed. U.S. tariffs on Canada and Mexico began as scheduled, at 12:01 a.m. Eastern Time on March 4.

Canada's retaliation began simultaneously: 25 percent tariffs on CA$30 billion (US$20.6 billion) of U.S. goods took effect on March 4, and Trudeau affirmed that 25 percent tariffs on an additional CA$125 billion (US$86 billion) of U.S. goods would take effect 21 days later, on March 25. After the tariffs were imposed on March 4, Trudeau said in a news conference that Trump's "excuse" for the tariffs of fentanyl was "completely bogus" and "completely false", and that Trump was imposing tariffs because he wished for "a total collapse of the Canadian economy" to "make it easier" for the U.S. to annex Canada. Trudeau called Trump's decision to impose tariffs "very dumb", and said Canada would "not back down from a fight".

The onset of the tariffs led to stock market declines in the U.S., especially for retailers and car manufacturers. On March 5, Lutnick said Trump was "listening to the offers from Mexico and Canada" and "thinking about trying to do something in the middle", suggesting that tariffs could take effect at a less significant scale. Later that day, Trump granted a one-month exception from the tariffs for automakers compliant with USMCA regulations, which represent about 85 percent of passenger vehicles imported to the U.S. from Mexico in 2024. Trump decided after meeting with executives from the three largest U.S. automakers—Ford, General Motors, and Stellantis—who said that the tariffs would harm U.S. companies more than their foreign rivals.

==== USMCA exemption ====
After speaking to Sheinbaum, Trump posted on social media that he would delay tariffs on all USMCA-compliant goods until April 2 "out of respect" for Sheinbaum, and thanked her for her "hard work and cooperation". Immediately afterward, Sheinbaum wrote on Twitter that she and Trump had an "excellent and respectful" call and thanked Trump, saying the two had "agreed that our work and collaboration have yielded unprecedented results".

Trudeau and Trump had spoken by phone on March 5, and Trump said their conversation ended on a "somewhat 'friendly'" note. After Sheinbaum's call, Trump extended the delay of tariffs on USMCA-compliant products to Canada on March 6. After Trump's announcement, Canadian officials said that the planned increases in their retaliatory tariffs would be suspended, though the initial tariffs on the U.S. would remain in place.

Although only about 50 percent of U.S. imports from Mexico and 38 percent of U.S. imports from Canada were USMCA-compliant in 2024, many companies had not filed the requisite paperwork because previous tariff levels were so low. Both Canada and Mexico believed that nearly all of their exports would be quickly made compliant. The Royal Bank of Canada estimated that almost 90% of Canadian exports entered the U.S. duty free in April 2025, and by August said 100% of Canadian energy exports and 95% of other exports were compliant with the trade pact.

==== US trade laws ====
There are several laws potentially allowing the U.S. administration to impose tariffs on foreign goods:

- The International Emergency Economic Powers Act (IEEPA) has been used by the U.S. administration to impose tariffs on Canada, Mexico and China for not stopping the smuggling of fentanyl into the U.S., and to impose "Liberation Day" or "reciprocal" tariffs on most on countries in the world. The U.S. administration claimed IEEPA as the legal authority to impose such tariffs even though IEEPA does not explicitly mention tariffs. Some U.S. importers disputed the administration's interpretation of IEEPA. The president invoked IEEPA on short notice without any preliminary investigation. The administration exempted goods covered under the United States–Mexico–Canada free-trade agreement (USMCA) from IEEPA tariffs. However, in February 2026, the U.S. Supreme Court ruled that a president could not use IEEPA to impose tariffs.
- Section 232 of the U.S. Trade Expansion Act of 1962 allows the US president to impose tariffs on specific foreign industries after an investigation by the Department of Commerce. This has been used to impose tariffs on steel (50 percent), aluminum (50 percent), and autos (25 percent excluding U.S. content), severely affecting these Canadian industries.
- Section 301 of Trade Act of 1974 allows tariffs on all products of a country following an investigation into unfair trade practices. This section has been used against China.
- Section 122 of the Trade Act of 1974 allows tariffs of up to 15 per cent for 150 days, after which Congressional approval is required to extend them. After the U.S. Supreme Court ruled against the IEEPA tariffs, the administration invoked section 122 tariffs and used the 150-day period to conduct investigations under section 301. The section 122 tariffs expired on July 24, 2026, and section 301 tariffs went into effect.
- Section 338 of the Tariff Act of 1930, also known as the Smoot–Hawley Tariff Act, allows tariffs of up to 50 per cent where countries have allegedly discriminated against U.S. businesses. No investigation is required and such tariffs have no expiry date. In August 2026, the U.S. levied section 338 tariffs of 50 percent against a variety of Canadian goods representing 5 percent of Canada's exports to the U.S. This was in reaction against Canada's counter-tariffs against the U.S.

=== Outset of trade war (March – April 2025) ===
On March 7, Trump threatened reciprocal tariffs on Canadian lumber and dairy products. He said the tariffs would be as high as about 250 percent and take effect the following week. Later, Trump said that Canada "must immediately drop their Anti-American Farmer Tariff of 250 percent to 390 percent on various U.S. dairy products, which has long been considered outrageous." Canada's tariff-rate quota on U.S. dairy products allows a certain amount of U.S. dairy products to enter the country without facing tariffs, with high tariffs only imposed if the imports surpass a certain amount. Since U.S. dairy exports to Canada have never exceeded the quota, the Canadian tariffs have never been activated.

Beginning on March 10, Ontario imposed a 25 percent surcharge on electricity exports to the U.S. states of Michigan, Minnesota, and New York. The next day, Trump said that Canada would face 50 percent tariffs on steel and aluminum on March 12, rather than the 25 percent tariffs imposed on every other country. Ford said that afternoon that he would suspend the surcharge on electricity exports, saying "The temperature needs to come down." In response, Trump said that the U.S. would only impose 25 percent tariffs on Canadian steel and aluminum. On March 13, the day after those tariffs entered force, Canada imposed 25 percent tariffs on an additional CA$29 billion (US$20 billion) of U.S. goods. In a joint statement, Ford and Lutnick said that U.S. and Canadian officials would meet in Washington, D.C., on March 13 to discuss a "renewed USMCA".

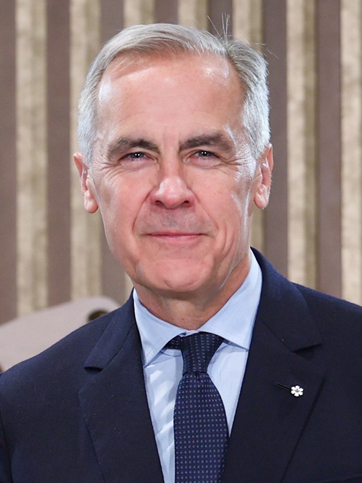
Mark Carney, Trudeau's successor as prime minister

On March 9, Mark Carney won the Liberal Party leadership election to succeed Trudeau as Canadian prime minister. In his acceptance speech, he said that he supported the Trudeau government's retaliatory tariffs and that his government would keep them in place "until the Americans show us respect." As prime minister–designate, he called Trump's threats to impose tariffs on dairy and metals "an attack on Canadian workers, families, and businesses", and that his government would ensure that its response had a "maximum impact in the U.S. and minimal impact here in Canada." He added that tariffs would remain until the U.S. made "credible, reliable commitments to free and fair trade." Carney was sworn in on March 14, beginning his premiership.

Trump pledged to impose "reciprocal" tariffs on all countries beginning in April 2. Regarding Canada, he said that if it did not drop "egregious, long time Tariffs" by April 2, he would "substantially increase" tariffs on Canadian cars entering the U.S. to "essentially, permanently shut down the automobile manufacturing business in Canada." Trump later announced that 25 percent tariffs on all imported cars and car parts would enter force on April 2. In response, Carney said that "it clear that the United States is no longer a reliable partner", and that while "it is possible that, with comprehensive negotiations, we will be able to restore some trust", "there will be no turning back" in the Canada-U.S. relationship.

Carney and Trump spoke directly for the first time in a phone call on March 28. Carney called the call "very cordial" and "substantial", and said that Trump "respected Canada's sovereignty". Trump described his call as "extremely productive" and said that he and Carney "agree on many things". Trump referred to Carney as the "prime minister of Canada", whereas he had addressed Trudeau as the "governor" of Canada as a U.S. state. In addition, Trump said that he believes "things will work out very well between Canada and the United States". Carney told Trump that Canada would respond with retaliatory tariffs if the U.S. tariffs planned for April 2 came into effect. Both leaders agreed to start "comprehensive negotiations about a new economic and security relationship" between Canada and the U.S. after the Canadian federal election on April 28.

On April 2, when Trump imposed universal 10 percent tariffs on imports from all countries, Canada and Mexico were exempted; the countries faced no new tariffs from the U.S. and the exemption given to most USMCA-compliant goods was extended indefinitely. The same day, the U.S. Senate narrowly approved a measure that would revoke some of Trump's tariffs on Canada. Four senators from the Republican Party (Susan Collins, Lisa Murkowski, Rand Paul and Mitch McConnell) joined all senators of the opposition Democratic Party in passing the resolution. However, the measure also needs to pass the Republican-controlled House of Representatives to take effect, in which Republican leaders have much more power to block said measure.

Sheinbaum said that Mexico had been given "preferential treatment" by the U.S. and that Canada and Mexico had avoided additional tariffs because of the USMCA. She added that U.S. and Mexican officials had a "mutual respect" relationship. Mexican economy secretary Ebrard said that the worldwide U.S. tariffs could help Mexico by making it cheaper to do business there relative to other countries. Despite Canada's exclusion, Carney denounced the tariffs and said they would "rupture the global economy" and harm economic growth. He also said he would seek to assemble a "coalition of like-minded countries" to create an alternative to the U.S., and that "if the United States no longer wants to lead, Canada will". He declared: "The 80-year period when the United States embraced the mantle of global economic leadership, when it forged alliances rooted in trust and mutual respect and championed the free and open exchange of goods and services, is over. While this is a tragedy, it is also the new reality."

Trump announced universal 25 percent tariffs on automobiles and automobile parts on March 27, which came into effect on April 3. When the U.S. tariffs began, Carney announced that Canada would retaliate with a 25 percent tariff on U.S. cars and trucks imported into Canada and that Canada would use the money generated from the tariffs to support people and businesses negatively impacted by U.S. tariffs. Sheinbaum said that the U.S. auto export tariffs were a concern for Mexico and that she hoped to continue speaking to U.S. officials to lower tariffs on auto exports, steel, and aluminum. Rather than retaliating with tariffs, however, Sheinbaum announced that Mexico would try to mitigate the impact of the tariffs by increasing domestic production of corn, beans, and rice, in addition to fuel and refined oil products to reduce its dependence on U.S. natural gas.

On April 15, Canada announced several measures to provide relief from tariffs, including a 6-month pause on tariffs for goods imported from the U.S. to be used in "Canadian manufacturing, processing and food and beverage packaging, and for those used to support public health, health care, public safety, and national security objectives." The country also exempted automakers that continue manufacturing in Canada from retaliatory tariffs against the U.S. and began accepting applicants to the "Large Enterprise Tariff Loan Facility" (LETL) program, which supports large Canadian businesses struggling to obtain access to liquidity.

=== Events after the 2025 Canadian federal election (April 2025 – July 2026) ===
Carney led the Liberal Party to victory in the April 28 Canadian federal election, with the party winning enough seats to form a minority government. Carney had campaigned on a promise to stand up to Trump's threats and protect Canada's economy; after winning, he declared: "Trump is trying to break us so he can own us. That will never happen." The day after the election, Trump called Carney to congratulate him on his victory; in a news conference on May 2, Carney said he and Trump had agreed to travel and meet in Washington, D.C., on May 6.

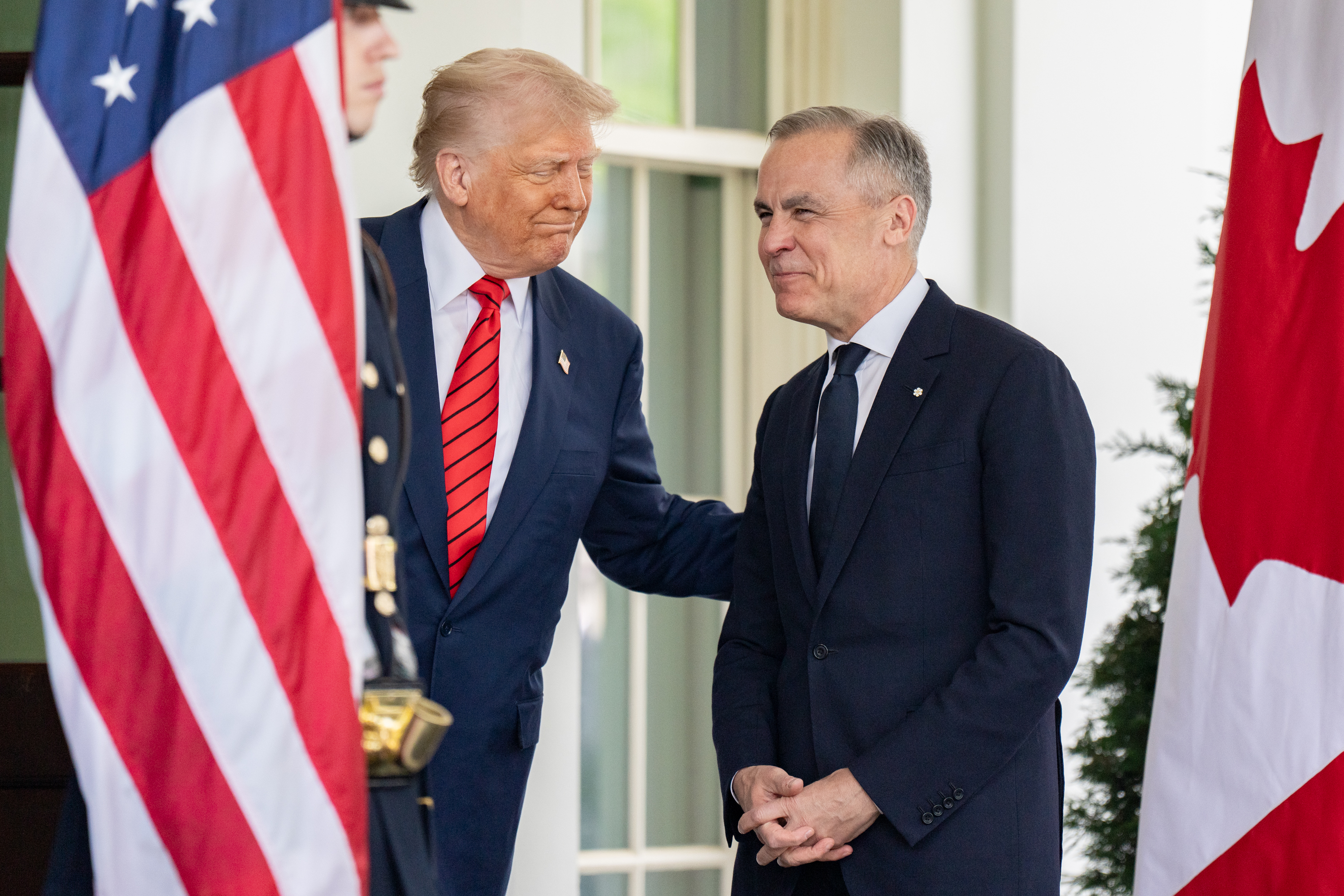
Donald Trump welcoming Mark Carney to the White House in May 2025

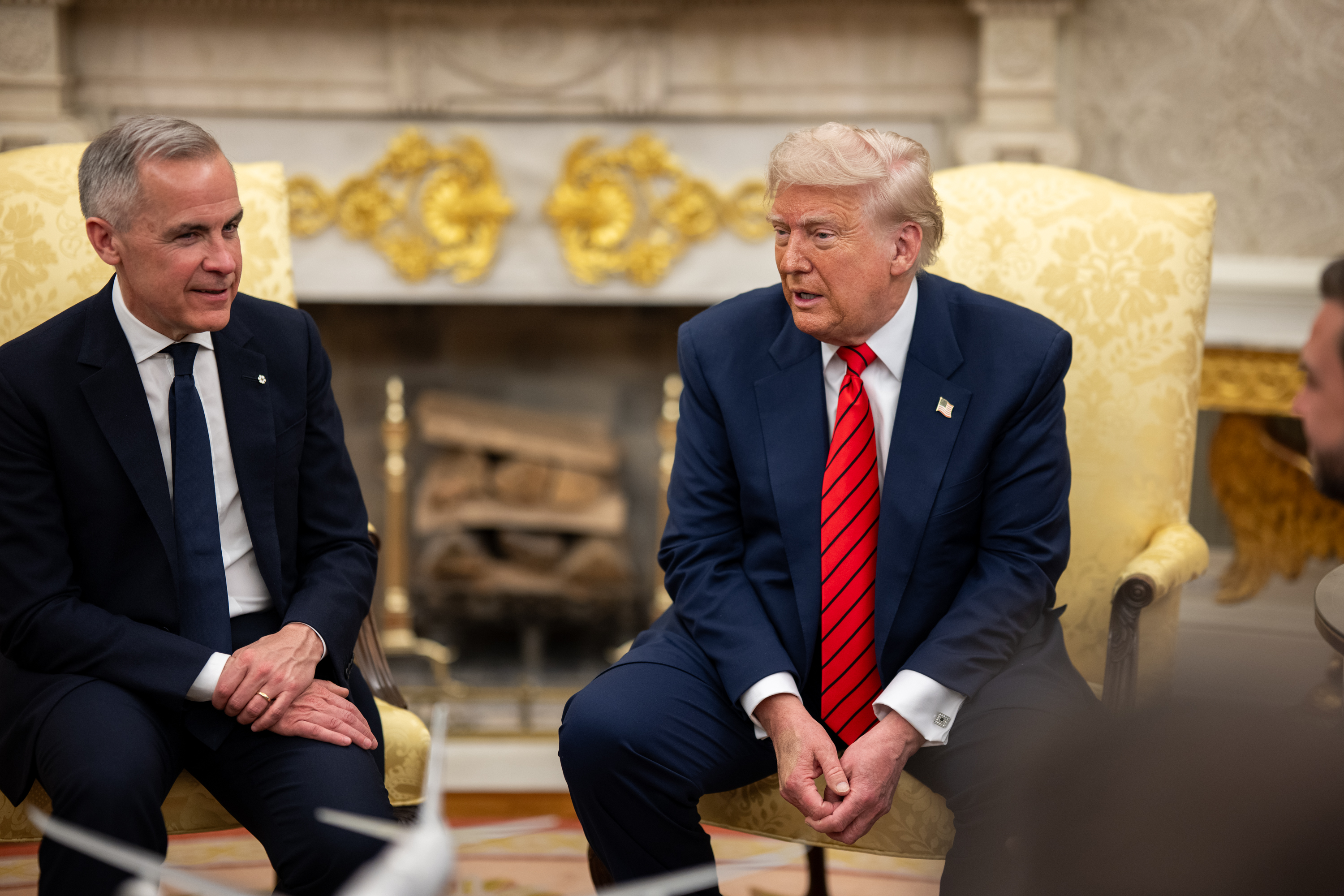
Carney speaking to Trump in the Oval Office during their May 2025 meeting

Carney met Trump at the White House on May 6. (Note: In addition to Carney, the Canadian delegation included international trade minister Dominic LeBlanc, foreign affairs minister Mélanie Joly, public safety minister David McGuinty, and Canadian ambassador to the United States Kirsten Hillman, alongside other top officials. Alongside Trump, American officials present for the meeting included Vice President JD Vance, Secretary of State Marco Rubio, commerce secretary Howard Lutnick, and U.S. trade representative Jamieson Greer.) Carney characterized the meeting, which was two hours long and included a 75-minute one-on-one meeting between the two leaders, as "very positive", and Trump said it went "very well" with "no tension". Trump largely refrained from criticizing Carney or Canada, calling Canada "a very special place" to him and responded to a reporter's question about what "concession" he wanted from Canada by saying he only sought "friendship". When Trump claimed that Canada would be better off as a part of the U.S., Carney told Trump: "As you know from real estate, there are some places that are not for sale," and that "Having met with the owners of Canada over the course of the campaign the last several months, it's not for sale, it won't be for sale ever." In response, Trump said "never say never" but did not press the matter further.

Speaking to reporters at the Canadian Embassy in Washington after the meeting, Carney said that during the meeting Canada "began the renegotiation of our trading relationship" with the U.S. and that Trump had committed to negotiate a new Canada-U.S. trade agreement. During their meeting, Trump and Carney also discussed foreign policy issues such as the Russia–Ukraine war, the Middle Eastern crisis, and China. Carney said he told Trump that it was not "useful" for him to continue referring to Canada as the "51st state" and threatening annexation. After the meeting, Trump echoed Carney's statement that the meeting set Canada-U.S. relations on a better trajectory and called Carney "a big step up" as a leader, criticizing Trudeau and former deputy prime minister Chrystia Freeland. Carney said he and Trump would meet next at the 51st G7 summit in June, which Canada hosted in Kananaskis, Alberta.

By May 14, 2025, consulting group Oxford Economics estimated that Canada had "effectively suspended almost all of its retaliatory tariffs on U.S. products" following the exemptions implemented a month prior. Minister of Finance François-Philippe Champagne called this a "falsehood", and stated that 70 percent of the tariffs were still in place.

On June 4, U.S. steel and aluminum tariffs doubled to 50 percent. Carney said Canada was in intense negotiations with the U.S. but preparing reprisals if they failed. Bea Bruske, president of the Canadian Labour Congress, stated 23,000 steel jobs and another 9,500 aluminum jobs would be impacted within days. At the G7 summit on June 16, the two countries pledged to work on a deal with the next 30 days. In a June 20 press conference, Carney said Canada would increase its counter-tariffs on steel and aluminium products, at the time 25%, on July 21 if talks with the United States stalled.

Carney invited Sheinbaum to the G7 summit, though Trump departed the summit early on June 15 to deal with the Twelve-Day War, missing a scheduled meeting between him and Sheinbaum. On June 27, U.S. president Donald Trump announced the suspension of the trade talks with Canada, also announcing new tariffs on goods crossing the Canada–United States border. That was reverted on June 30, when White House economic advisor Kevin Hassett announced the restart of the trade talks with Canada after the country scrapped its digital services tax on Canadian-source revenue received by large technology firms (which mainly affected American companies including Amazon, Meta, and Google).

On July 11, Trump announced in a letter sent to Carney that the US would raise the tariffs to 35%, starting August 1. He cited the retaliatory tariffs imposed by Canada against the US as the main reason, as well as the continued flow of fentanyl into the US from Canada and the trade deficit with Canada. The letter also stated that if Canada raised its tariffs against the US, the US would raise its tariffs by that percentage on top of the existing 35%, as well as saying if Canada works with the US to stop the flow of fentanyl, the US may adjust the tariffs upwards or downwards, based on the relationships with Canada.

On August 5, the Associated Press reported that due to the USMCA exemption, as of August 2025, over 85% of Canada-U.S. trade and 84% of Mexico-U.S. trade remains tariff-free.

On August 22, Carney announced Canada would drop many of their retaliatory tariffs by matching the USMCA exemption in order to jump start trade talks. "Canada currently has the best trade deal with the United States. And while it's different from what we had before, it's still better than that of any other country," said Carney.

On October 23, Trump announced that all trade negotiations with Canada were canceled after the Ontario government published a public service announcement with audio clips of former US president Ronald Reagan stating that tariffs on foreign goods are poor policy in the long term. Trump later said he would raise tariffs on Canada by "more than 10%" in response to the advertisement.

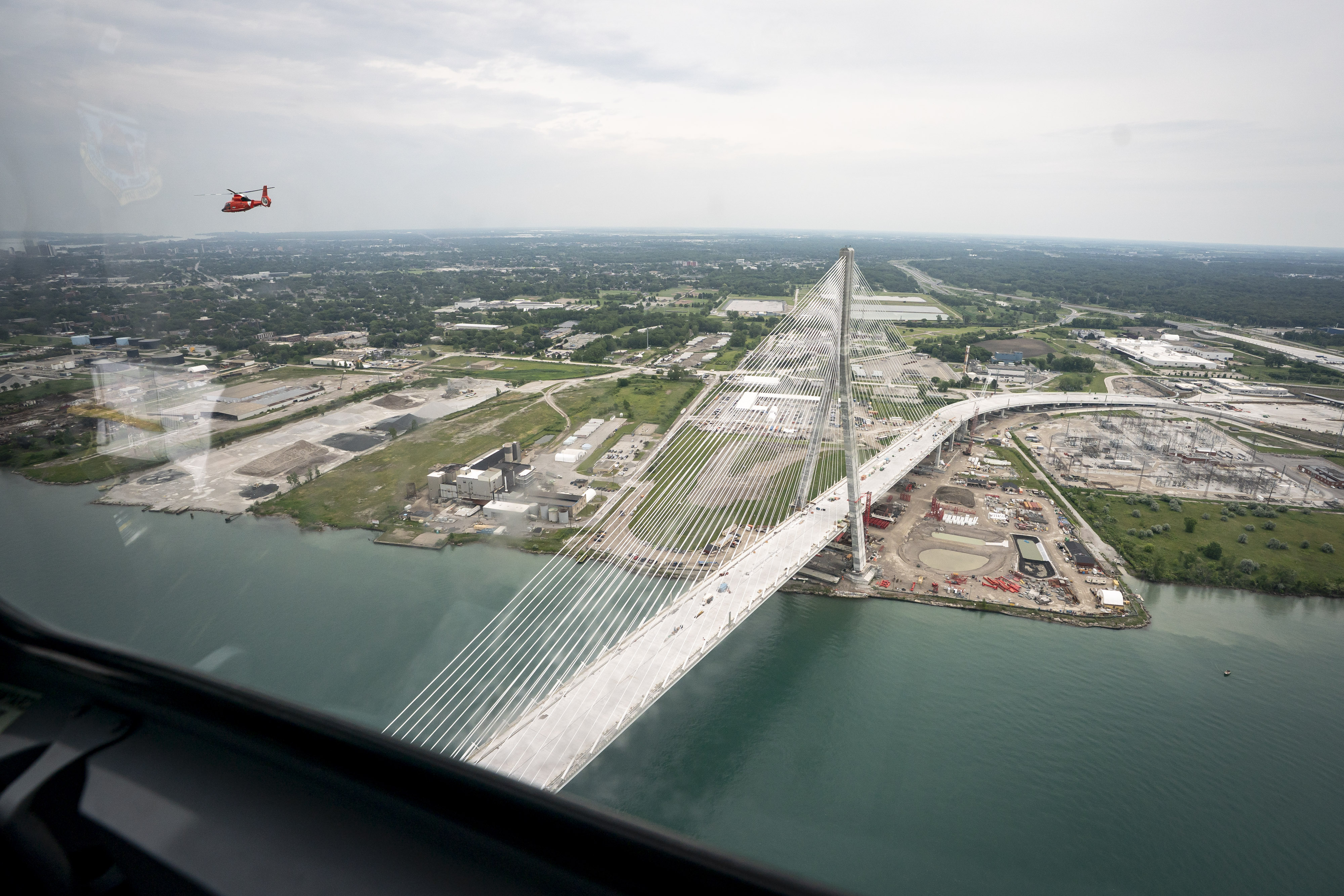
Gordie Howe International Bridge, connecting Detroit to Ontario

On February 8, 2026, Trump threatened to block the opening of the Gordie Howe International Bridge, citing Canada's recent trade developments with China and the alleged one-sided nature of the contract (wherein Canada gains all revenue from bridge tolls to pay back construction costs, as Canada built the bridge in its entirety). Trump said the bridge's opening will be delayed until multiple trade and bridge related grievances were resolved. Trump's announcement was criticised by politicians, business leaders and industry groups. The bridge ceremonially opened on July 24 without the presence of American officials.

=== Escalation (July 2026 – present) ===
On July 20, 2026, Trump announced that he would impose 50% tariffs on certain Canadian goods, which would come into effect 30 days later, on August 19, under Section 338 of the Tariff Act of 1930, also known as the Smoot–Hawley Tariff Act. A Trump administration official argued that Canada's retaliatory measures were discriminatory, and said "specifically Canada has to be held accountable for this continued discrimination". Carney subsequently had a meeting with Canada's provincial premiers in Charlottetown, and told the press that Canada is "in pursuit of a comprehensive agreement that addresses all tariff-related sectors", and that if no agreement would be reached, Canada would consider further retaliation. In August, a Canadian delegation led by cabinet minister Dominic LeBlanc and lead trade negotiator Janice Charette went to Washington, D.C. to negotiate an agreement. The Carney government reportedly offered some specific concessions, such as repealing retaliatory Canadian tariffs on American-made cars. On August 16, sources told The Globe and Mail that American tariffs on lumber and automotive goods were the biggest points of contention.

On August 18, 2026, hours before the Section 338 tariffs would come into effect, Carney spoke with Trump on the phone, and a proposal of terms made by negotiators on both sides was given to Trump to review. That night, Trump suspended the imposition of the tariffs for 3 days, posting on Truth Social that he had "paused the 50% Tariffs against Canada, that were scheduled to kick in tomorrow morning for a three-day period, based on the fact that Canada and the US, subject to the finalization of documents, have a DEAL!", and implied that the Keystone XL pipeline project may be revived, saying "the great Keystone XL Pipeline, long ago killed by Sleepy Joe Biden, may be awoken from the grave!". The next morning, Trump confirmed to the press that the US had come to a deal with Canada subject to the finalization of documents and said that he had "a very good conversation with the Prime Minister last night". Carney issued a statement saying that "substantial progress has been made, although there is important work still to be done", but did not speak of a tentative deal. However, on August 21, the last day to finalize the deal before the tariffs would come into effect, negotiations broke down and no deal was signed. Mark Carney wrote in a statement that evening that Canada suspended trade negotiations with the US because "last-minute changes in the U.S. proposed terms were unfair, uneconomic, and called into question the reliability of any deal", while US representative Jamieson Greer said that "Canada declined to finalize the trade deal under the terms agreed earlier this week, despite the U.S. offer to Canada to receive the best treatment of any major exporter to our market, new demands and walk backs of other commitments by Canada have upended the careful balance reached in the past days", and "in addition, Canada is continuing to maintain its prolonged retaliation against the United States, including, among other things, flat-out prohibitions on certain American goods and services".

The Section 338 tariffs on about US$20 billion worth of Canadian goods came into effect at 12:01 AM Eastern Daylight Time on August 22. That morning, Carney held a press conference at Parliament Hill, in which he reiterated why negotiations with the US broke down, adding that "they asked too much and offered too little" and that "we were not prepared to compromise Canada's sovereignty or undermine our key industries", and announced that Canada would "match Washington's tariffs dollar-for-dollar" in retaliation. Carney also stated that the Americans made "threats to the French language" and "Quebec culture", and made efforts "to restrict our protections of our language, our culture, and in effect, our sovereignty", which helped spell "the end of this phase of the negotiations", which was dismissed by Trump and Lutnick. On August 24, Trump hit back saying that tariffs on Canadian cars, trucks, automotive parts, and steel will be increased to 50% on January 1, 2027, in a post on Truth Social, adding that "Canada will be treated like a State no longer! On Trade, and in other ways, also, they are among the worst Nations in the World to deal with. They feel entitled, and yet, WE DON'T NEED CANADA, THEY NEED US!" Trump also said on Truth Social that day that "someone should get these clowns to 'fall in line' or, the consequences for Canada will be far WORSE!".

On August 24, the Premier of Ontario Doug Ford responded to Trump's Truth Social post announcing 2027 tariff hikes, saying, "[Trump] could kiss my ass", and that he would pursue further retaliation against him. That afternoon, Donald Trump called Doug Ford "the less charismatic, intelligent, and overall unimpressive brother of the late, great, Rob Ford", and said that "without the United States, Canada couldn't survive — It's where they get all of their money and, because of their current bad leadership, primarily Governor Carney, and his Flunky, Ford, they will not be allowed to keep taking advantage of the United States" in a post on Truth Social in response. The next day, when Ford was asked about his comments on the radio, he stood behind his comments and called Trump a "loser".

On August 25, the Canadian Department of Finance officially announced that it would be imposing retaliatory tariffs ranging from 15 to 50% on a list of over 700 American goods, worth about US$19.9 billion, on September 8. The Department of Finance said the counter-tariffs would match the U.S. Section 338 and Section 232 tariffs "dollar for dollar, rate for rate", with each product's rate set to the corresponding U.S. rate, and that they would cover CA$27.6 billion of imports concentrated in steel, dairy, appliances, agricultural equipment, pulp and paper, and electronics. The measures take effect at 12:01 a.m. on September 8, apply only to goods originating in the United States, and do not apply to goods already in transit to Canada. Alongside the tariffs, Minister of Finance François-Philippe Champagne announced a CA$7.5 billion package of support measures for affected workers and businesses, including CA$1.5 billion through the Regional Tariff Response Initiative, CA$500 million in new liquidity funding through the Business Development Bank of Canada, CA$2 billion through a new Canada Strong Diversification Fund and CA$3.5 billion in rapid-response supports for workers and employers, in addition to the nearly CA$25 billion provided since the U.S. tariffs began.

On August 27, Donald Trump signed an executive order to rename Lake Ontario as "Lake America", applicable only within US federal agency reference sources, following his statement that the U.S. does not expect to do "much business with Ontario any longer".

On September 8, the day that Canadian retaliatory tariffs came into effect, Trump, in response, imposed bans on a range of Canadian products including dairy goods, alcoholic spirits, and motorcycles under Section 338 of the Smoot–Hawley Tariff Act, effective September 29. It was also announced that day that the US would impose 50% tariffs on 110 Canadian products and lift certain tariffs on other products, which came into effect on September 15.

On September 12, The Wall Street Journal reported that Mark Carney had been seeking Canada having stronger ties with the European Union amid the trade war and suggested to European leaders that Canada become an "Associate Member of the European Union". The next day, Carney said that "we're not looking to become a member of the European Union" but that Canada will pursue "a unique alliance with the European Union". On September 16, President of the European Commission Ursula von der Leyen said that she would like to work "on opening the door for Canada to be the first associate member of the European Union", in a speech to the European Parliament to which she invited Carney. That day, Trump said that such an agreement could be a "hostile act" and that "if it's a bad intention, we'll put very heavy tariffs on Europe, which is a possibility".

On September 23, 2026, Carney said in an interview with The New York Times that he made preparations for a potential US invasion of Canada.

On September 29, Peter Navarro said that if Canada "interferes in" American elections they "will pay even more dearly", and told Canadians on K Street to "get the hell out of our country". US Ambassador to Canada Pete Hoekstra said that the US is "monitoring" potential Canadian election interreference and said that "if some of it becomes election interference then America will respond to it". On October 21, the Embassy of the United States in Ottawa published a "fact sheet" regarding Canadian interference in American elections saying that "the Canadian government brushes off concerns about potential interference in U.S. elections, even as its ministers and premiers openly describe plans to influence American politics in official documents and public appearances". On October 23, Carney responded saying that "there is no merit to these claims", that "I'm disappointed that their envoy sees that as his role to make these suggestions", and that "we have no intention to interfere with their democratic processes".

On November 1, Carney said that he and Trump had discussed a new trade deal on October 31.

== Reactions and responses ==
=== Canadian reactions ===
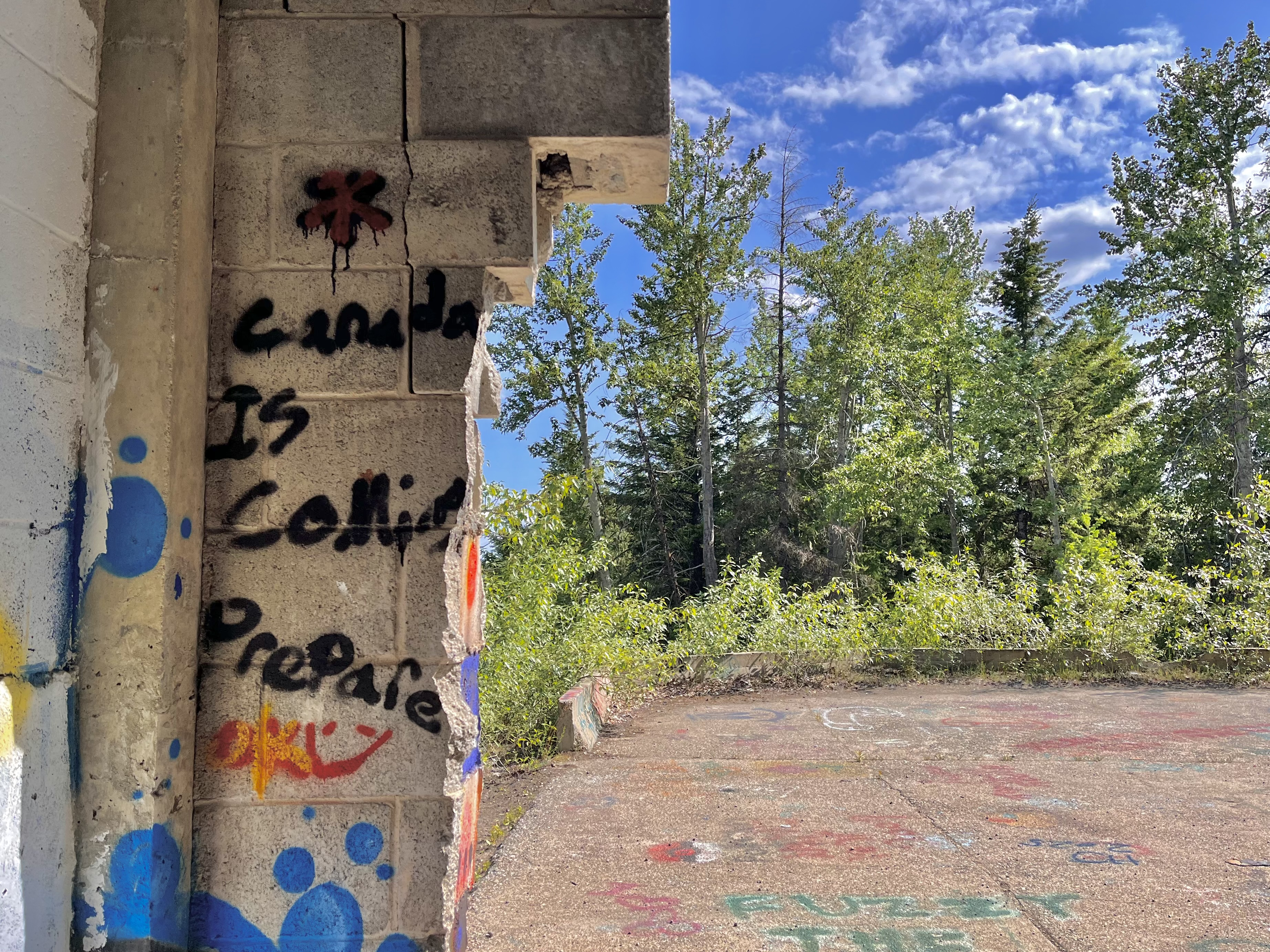
Graffiti reading “Canada Is Coming Prepare” 30 miles south of the border at Colville Air Force Station, Washington

The United States tariffs and threats against Canada have harmed historically strong Canada-U.S. relations, caused increases in Canadian nationalism and patriotism, and led to an uptick in anti-Americanism.

In February 2025, a poll by the Angus Reid Institute found that 91 percent of Canadians expressed a desire to decrease Canada's reliance on the U.S. as a trade partner; it also showed a 10 percentage-point increase in Canadians saying they are "very proud" of and "have a deep emotional attachment" to Canada compared to December 2024. An Ipsos poll in February 2025 found that, after Trump's threats, 68 percent of Canadians thought less of the United States, while 65 percent said they would avoid traveling to the U.S. and 67 percent said they would avoid buying U.S.-made products. The same month, a Léger poll found that 27 percent of Canadians considered the U.S. an "enemy", while only 1 percent of Americans thought the same of Canada.

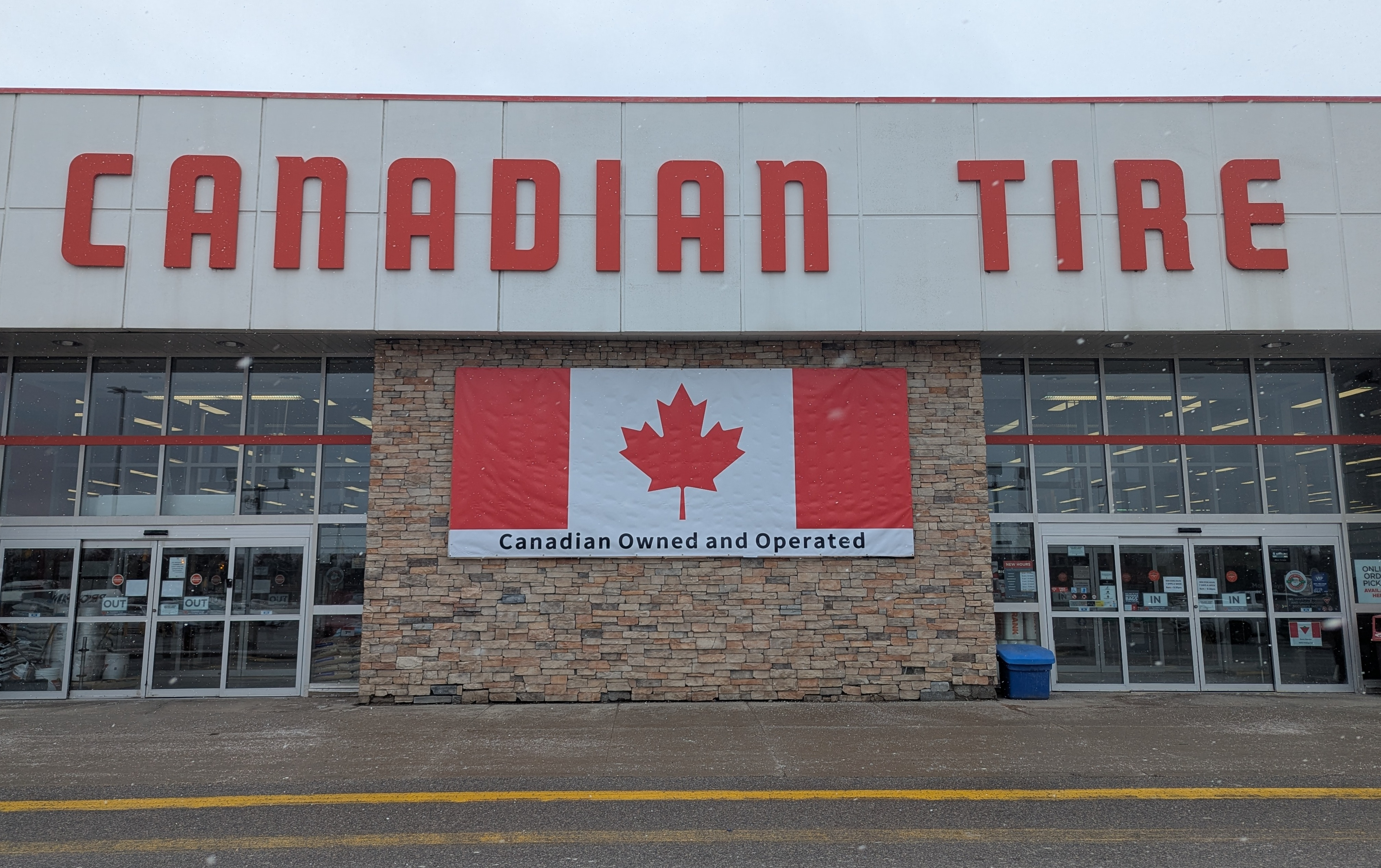
A Canadian Tire store in Ontario featuring a Canadian flag reading "Canadian owned and operated"

In the days after the initial tariff announcements, Canadian crowds booed the U.S. national anthem at sporting events featuring American teams. Many Canadians began a boycott of American goods and travel to the United States and a "Buy Canadian" movement gained traction across the country. As prime minister, Trudeau supported the Canadian boycott.

Many Canadian politicians, including Trudeau and Poilievre, spoke of national unity, and the trade war and conflict with the U.S. created a rally 'round the flag effect in the lead-up to the 2025 Canadian federal election. Both Canadians across the political spectrum and Canadian society at large have grown concerned over threats from the United States; Canadian politicians have a motive to "push back immediately and forcefully" against Trump and the U.S. because of the threats to Canadian sovereignty.

The trade war also increased support for the removal of trade barriers between Canada's provinces, which Trudeau said that all premiers support but that "challenges within bureaucracies" persist. Simultaneously, Alberta premier Danielle Smith pledged to hold a referendum on Albertan separatism in 2026 if enough voters sign a petition in favor of doing so.

Whereas in early January 2025, the Liberals had trailed the Conservatives in federal election opinion polls by over 20 points for months, the party began to close the gap in polls after the trade war began and Trudeau announced his resignation. Support for the New Democratic Party and Bloc Québécois also fell dramatically, and polling suggested a close race between the Carney-led Liberals and the Poilievre-led Conservatives.

In February 2025, following Trump's initial announcement, Canadian travel to the United States dropped by 40 percent compared to February 2024. A March 2025 Abacus Data poll found that 62 percent of Canadians planned to avoid traveling to the U.S. for the next year, and American tourism groups are worried they will lose Canadian tourist traffic. The mayor of Haines, Alaska, a town connected to the outside world only through Yukon, has expressed concern that the tariffs will affect the normally friendly relations between Americans and Canadians. The shift in Canadian travel away from the U.S. could amount to an annual loss of US$4 billion for the U.S. economy. In March 2025, the Trump administration said that beginning on April 11, 2025, Canadians entering the U.S. for more than 30 days are required to register with authorities and be fingerprinted.

=== Other reactions ===
The tariffs could affect negotiations on renewing the USMCA, for which a review is due in 2026. Trump has ordered U.S. officials to review and report how to correct "unfair" trade practices by April 1, 2025. Canadian officials have grown concerned that Trump may threaten tariffs to force changes to the agreement.

In the United States, a February 2025 survey by The Harris Poll for Bloomberg News found that around 60 percent of Americans believe that high tariffs could cause consumer prices to rise. The following month, a poll by the University of Michigan found that the number of Americans expressing confidence in the economy fell by 11 percent in March 2025, and that the number expecting inflation rose. In the United States, Trump's initial decision to impose tariffs on Canada and Mexico was criticized by the editorial board of The Wall Street Journal, which said that his "justification for this economic assault on the neighbors makes no sense" and that Trump had begun "the dumbest trade war in history".

Many Americans believe Trump's threats to annex Canada are a joke or a negotiation strategy, and Trump's tariff policy in general raised questions about whether he has a serious intent to impose tariffs or whether his orders to impose them are threats intended only to serve as a negotiation tactic. The imposition and rollback of tariffs created uncertainty for many businesses, and has led to an erosion of international confidence in the U.S. as a reliable trade partner.

According to Deutsche Welle, Trump's imposition of tariffs on Canada and Mexico violated both the USMCA and the rules of the World Trade Organization (WTO), of which all three countries are members. On March 13, 2025, the WTO said that Canada had formally requested to begin dispute resolution proceedings with the United States, saying that the tariffs violated the U.S.'s commitments under the 1994 General Agreement on Tariffs and Trade. On April 7, Canada also initiated WTO dispute resolution proceedings regarding the U.S. tariffs on cars and car parts.

The European Commission—the executive branch of the European Union—condemned U.S. tariffs on Canada and Mexico, and called for the U.S. to "reconsider its approach".

In February 2026, the United States House of Representatives voted to repeal the tariffs that had been imposed on Canadian goods during Donald Trump's administration. The resolution passed by a 219–211 vote, with a small number of Republican lawmakers joining nearly all Democrats in support. The tariffs had originally been enacted under a national emergency declaration in February 2025, and their repeal represented a rare bipartisan rebuke of Trump's trade policy. Following the vote, President Trump reportedly threatened political consequences for Republicans who voted against the measure. While passage in the House reflects congressional concern over the tariffs, actual repeal would still require Senate approval and presidential assent, and was expected to face a potential veto.

== Economic impact ==
=== Stock market ===
The trade war led investors to fear that tariffs could create inflation by causing rises in both manufacturing costs and consumer prices, leading to volatility in the U.S. stock market. Trump has characterized the economy as being in "period of transition" for the start of his presidency. On March 3, after Trump confirmed the imposition of tariffs on Canada and Mexico, as well as the increase of tariffs on China from 10 percent to 20 percent set to take place the same day, the U.S. stock markets dropped considerably: the S&P 500 index fell by 1.8 percent, while the Nasdaq-100 index fell by 2.6 percent. By March 6, the S&P 500 had lost almost all of its gains since November 2024.

On March 9, Trump declined to say whether his policies could lead to a recession in the United States. He said in an interview with Fox News that it would take time to see the payoff from his policies, but that they would ultimately be worthwhile, saying "If you look at China, they have a 100-year perspective. We have a quarter. We go by quarters, and you can't go by that. You have to do what's right." The next day, the S&P 500 dropped an additional 2.7 percent—its largest single-day drop of 2025—and the Nasdaq by 4 percent. On March 10, the S&P 500 fell by 1.4 percent, pushing it into a correction, which is defined as a fall in a stock market index of over 10 percent from its peak; the S&P 500 was 10.1 percent lower than its record high, which was on February 19. The market's losses were equivalent to over US$4 trillion in value; the Nasdaq-100 and Russell 2000 indices had already entered corrections. On March 11, the S&P 500 rose by 2.1 percent, exiting a correction, though ending the week down 2.3 percent. After Trump's April 2 tariffs, the S&P 500 fell over 10 percent in two days, in its worst week since the COVID-19 recession of 2020.

In Canada and Mexico, stock markets were more stable. By March 6, Mexico's most prominent stock market index, the Índice de Precios y Cotizaciones, had risen 6 percent since the beginning of 2025. Canada's benchmark index, the S&P/TSX, was almost the same level it began the year.

=== Prospective effects ===
The trade war is expected to significantly disrupt trade between the United States, Mexico, and Canada and upend supply chains across North America. Many economists have expressed skepticism over the effectiveness of Trump's strategy in imposing tariffs, and many have said that increased tariffs would raise the prices of consumer goods in the U.S. and worsen the country's cost-of-living crisis. The Budget Lab at Yale University estimated that the tariffs would lead to a loss of about US$1,200 in purchasing power for the typical American household. While some companies will opt to bear the cost of the tariff, others are likely to raise prices on consumer products to offset lost revenue or attempt to negotiate lower prices for their products.

Because the United States does not produce enough oil to satisfy its demand, 10 percent tariffs on Canadian oil and energy will likely lead to an increased oil price across the United States. This is especially true in the Midwest, a region heavily reliant on oil imported from Alberta. The Canadian government had previously said that U.S. gas prices could increase by US$0.75 per gallon overnight if tariffs were imposed. Tariffs could also increase the cost of electricity in some U.S. states, especially those that rely on Canadian provinces like Ontario, Quebec, and British Columbia for energy. Outside North America, tariffs on energy imports would give European and Asian oil refineries a competitive advantage against their rivals.

The tariffs could also lead to price increases in various U.S. imports from Mexico and Canada, including fruits, vegetables, beer, liquor, and electronics from Mexico and potatoes, grains, lumber, and steel from Canada. Price increases would compound with high inflation in the U.S., especially in grocery prices. The cost of Canadian lumber, used by many homebuilders in the U.S., would also likely increase. The tariffs would also cause risk to the U.S. farming and fishing industries.

Canada, a highly trade-dependent economy, will also likely suffer, experiencing harmed economic growth and increased prices for businesses and consumers. The Canadian economy could enter a recession within six months if the tariffs are maintained. Quebec premier Legault said that the U.S. tariffs could cause the loss of as many as 100,000 Canadian jobs within the province. Prices could also increase in Canada for even domestically produced products, mainly if the tariffs cause economic difficulties for smaller businesses. Canadian companies being unable to sell their products to Americans at the same volume would also cause some of them to cut workers, scale back, or even shut down entirely. Canada's mineral processing industry will likely be significantly harmed by the tariffs.

== See also ==
- 2025–2026 Mexico–United States trade war
- Canada–China trade war – Economic conflict between 2024 and 2026
- China–United States trade war
- Tariffs in the second Trump administration
- 2025–2026 Brazil–United States diplomatic dispute
