= Market correction =

New equilibrium price of a commodity

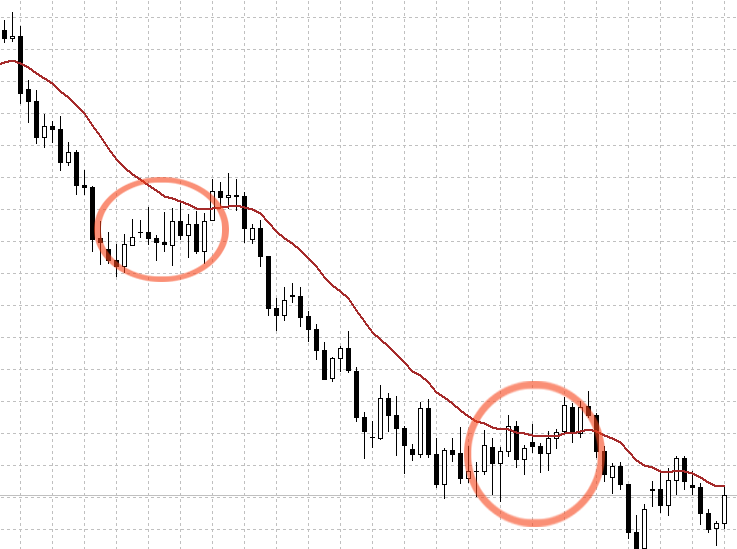
A candlestick chart of a correction, with periods of seeming stability circled.

A stock market correction is typically defined as a drop of more than 10% in the value of a stock index. Corrections end once stocks attain new highs. Stock market corrections are often measured retrospectively from recent highs to their lowest closing price. Each correction is different, but corrections have historically been shorter, sharper, and steeper than bear markets, which are typically defined as a sustained drop of more than 20%.

The most recent example of a stock market correction in the United States was when the S&P 500 fell 18.9% from February 19, 2025 to April 8, 2025. The stock index set a new all-time high on June 27, 2025—marking the end of the correction.

A correction may also be a drop in a commodity price, as in the 2000s United States housing market correction.

== Measurement ==
A stock market correction is generally measured from a recent closing high to a subsequent closing low in a broad market index or other security price. The commonly used threshold is a decline of at least 10%, while a decline of 20% or more in a broad market index is generally classified as a bear market.

Corrections are usually identified retrospectively, because the endpoint of the decline is not known until prices stop falling and begin to recover. The same percentage decline may also be interpreted differently depending on the index, asset class, or time period being measured.
