= 2025–2026 Mexico–United States trade war =

Ongoing economic conflict

- Part of the Tariffs in the second Trump administration
- Date: February 1, 2025 – present (1 year, 9 months and 2 days)
- Location: Mexico; United States
- Caused by: Tariffs imposed by the United States
- Status: Ongoing

Parties
United States	Mexico

Lead figures
(United States) Donald Trump	(Mexico) Claudia Sheinbaum

On February 1, 2025, a trade war started by the United States against Mexico as well as Canada began when the U.S. president Donald Trump signed orders imposing near-universal tariffs on goods from the two countries entering the United States. The order called for 25 percent tariffs on all imports from Mexico.

In response, Mexican president Claudia Sheinbaum said Mexico would enact tariffs and non-tariff retaliation against the United States. On February 3, one day before they were set to take effect, both leaders negotiated a one-month delay for the tariffs.

The U.S. tariffs took effect on March 4; On March 6, Trump exempted goods compliant with the United States–Mexico–Canada Agreement (USMCA) from tariffs. Later, the U.S. imposed universal tariffs on steel, aluminum, and automotive imports, including those from Mexico and Canada. Due to the USMCA exemption, as of August 2025, 84% of Mexico-U.S. trade remains tariff-free.

Trump has said the tariffs are intended to reduce the U.S.'s trade deficit with Canada and Mexico, force both countries to secure their borders with the U.S. against illegal immigration and fentanyl smuggling, and promote domestic manufacturing in the United States. Sheinbaum, Trudeau, and Trudeau's successor, Mark Carney, have called the U.S. tariffs unjustified and stated that they violate the USMCA. Economists have said tariffs would likely disrupt trade between the three countries, upending supply chains and increasing consumer prices. In February 2026, the U.S. Supreme Court struck down the tariffs the Trump administration implemented on imports from Canada and Mexico under the International Emergency Economic Powers Act in Learning Resources, Inc. v. Trump.

== Economic background ==
=== U.S.–Mexico trade ===
The economies of the United States and Mexico are highly intertwined. In 2024, roughly US$800 billion of goods were transported across the Mexico–U.S. border, and over US$1 billion in commerce between the two countries occurs daily. In 2023, U.S. exports to Mexico totaled US$322 billion, while the U.S. imported over US$475 billion of Mexican products, according to data from the U.S. Census Bureau. More than 75 percent of Mexico's exports go to the United States, and the U.S. is Mexico's primary trading partner. Roughly 70 percent of Mexico's natural gas consumption comes from the U.S., and the U.S. imports about 700,000 barrels of crude oil from Mexico each day. Food production between the two countries is also closely integrated: the U.S. sources roughly half of its fresh fruits and vegetables from Mexico, and Mexico is the top market for U.S. agricultural exports. Mexico is the third-largest exporter of steel to the U.S., behind only Canada and Brazil; both Mexico and the U.S. have been accused of violating an agreement signed alongside the USMCA to limit steel exports between each other. Some Americans, including Trump, have said that Mexico has exceeded the level of exports allowed under the agreement. At the same time, the Mexican steel organization Canacero reported that the level of U.S. steel exports also breached the deal. Mexico is the top source of both automobiles and automobile parts imported to the United States.

=== Trade agreements ===
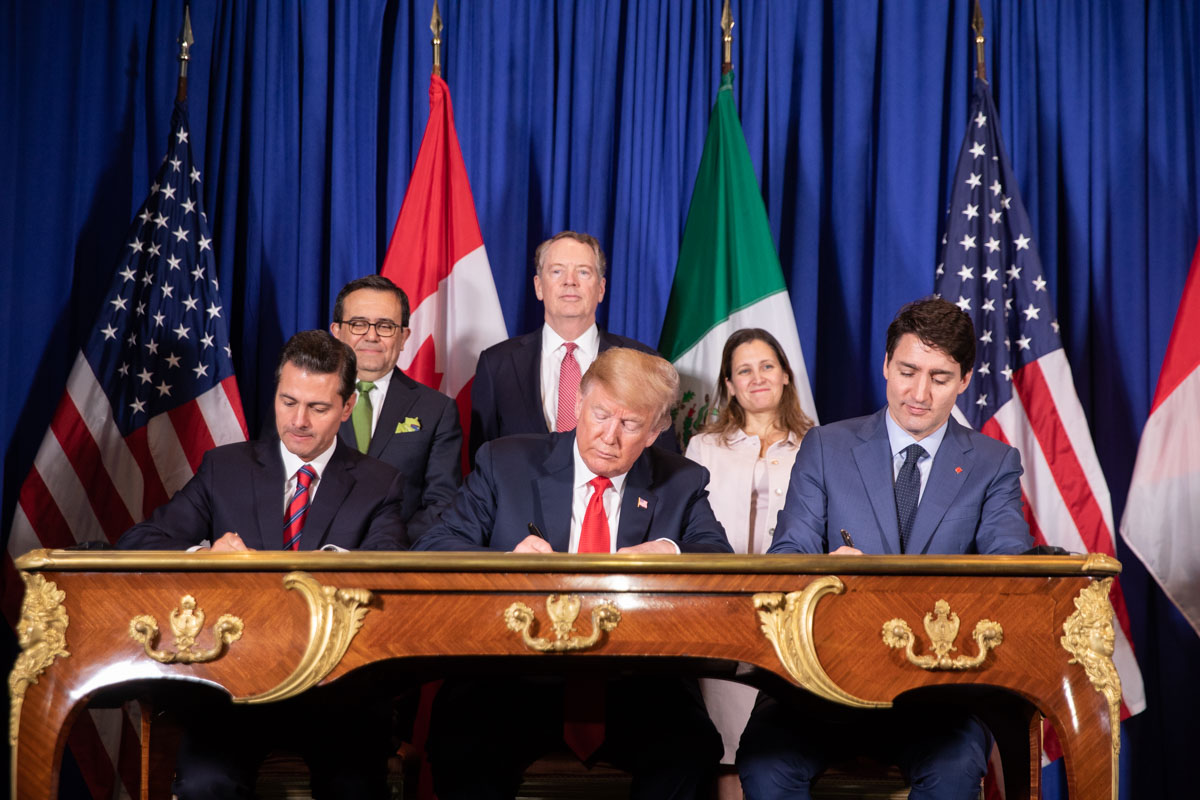
Enrique Peña Nieto, Donald Trump, and Justin Trudeau signing the United States–Mexico–Canada Agreement in 2018

In 1994, the United States, Canada, and Mexico signed the North American Free Trade Agreement (NAFTA), a free trade agreement that eliminated almost all tariffs on trade between the three countries. (Note: Canada and the United States signed an earlier bilateral free trade agreement in 1988.) NAFTA has been described as a source of political division. In the U.S., it caused offshoring as U.S. companies relocated their businesses to Mexico for cheaper labor, harming American factory towns and workers. The backlash against free trade allowed candidates like Donald Trump, who supported protectionist policies, to rise to prominence in U.S. politics. However, many parts of the U.S. benefited from NAFTA's increased trade and economic activity. In 2020, during Trump's first term as U.S. president, NAFTA was replaced by the United States–Mexico–Canada Agreement (USMCA), primarily because Trump disagreed with NAFTA. Changes between NAFTA and the USMCA were largely cosmetic; the new agreement maintained zero tariffs on most products traded across the three countries, but allowed some tariffs to be imposed for national security matters. The region covered by USMCA is one of the world's largest free trade zones.

== Initial tariff threats ==
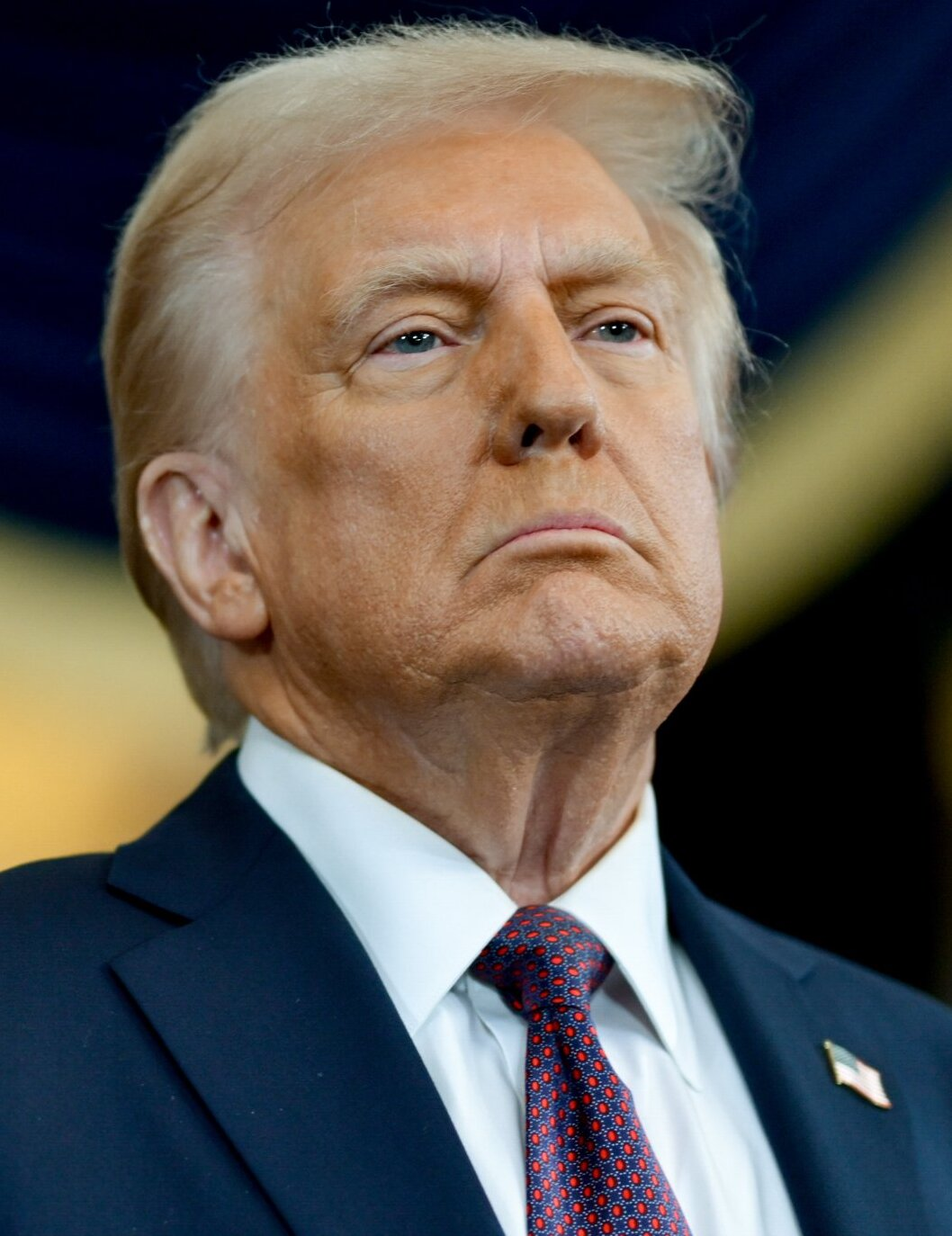
United States president Donald Trump on the day of his second inauguration in 2025

On February 1, 2025, Trump signed three executive orders imposing 25 percent tariffs on all goods from Mexico and Canada except for Canadian oil and energy exports, which received a 10 percent tariff. Mexican energy exports will be subject to the full 25 percent tariff. The orders were issued under the International Emergency Economic Powers Act (IEEPA) and were set to take effect at 12:01 a.m. Eastern Standard Time on February 4. Trump also ordered 10 percent tariffs on China, which would be imposed in addition to the existing tariffs of up to 25 percent on many Chinese goods. The orders included a clause allowing the U.S. to increase its tariffs if the countries respond with their own tariffs or other retaliatory measures.

Trump used the IEEPA—a 1977 U.S. law giving the president broad financial power during declared national emergencies—to circumvent the USMCA's tariff restriction for reasons other than national security, marking the first time the law was used to impose tariffs. Trump cited both the influx of illegal immigrants crossing the United States's borders with both Mexico and Canada, as well as the opioid epidemic in the United States fueled by fentanyl originating in China reaching the U.S. through Mexico and Canada.

According to Bloomberg News, Trump advisors Peter Navarro and Stephen Miller were the leading officials in the economic discussions regarding the imposition of tariffs. At the same time, China was included at the urging of the National Security Council. In a post on Truth Social, Trump said: "We need to protect Americans, and it is my duty as president to ensure the safety of all. I made a promise on my campaign to stop the flood of illegal aliens and drugs from pouring across our borders, and Americans overwhelmingly voted in favor of it." While he acknowledged that the tariffs could cause "temporary short-term disruption," he said that they needed to be imposed. Trump also claimed that "Tariffs don't cause inflation" but rather that "They cause success."

=== Mexican response ===
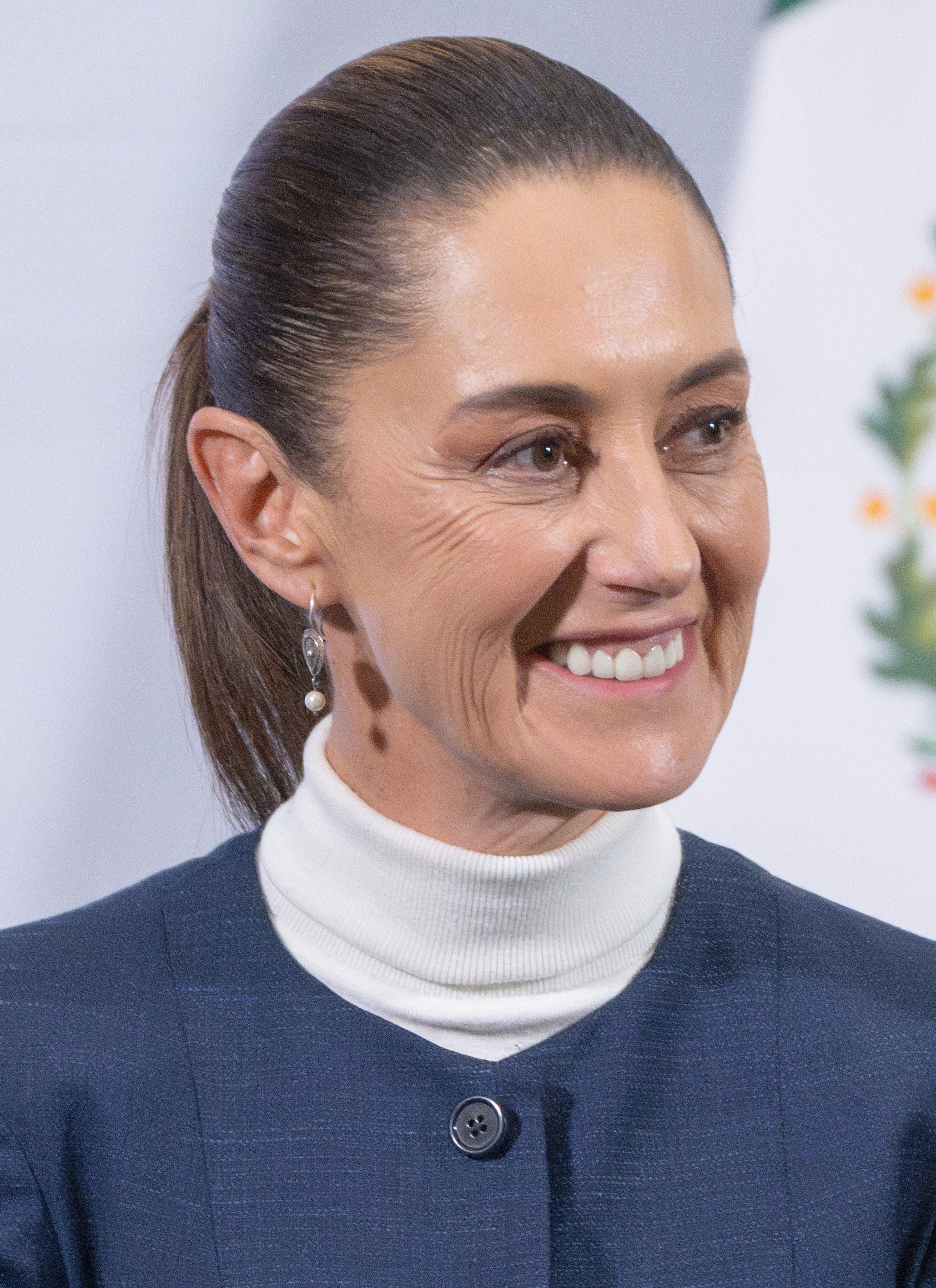
Mexican president Claudia Sheinbaum

Sheinbaum had spoken to Trump before his inauguration to de-escalate his tariff threats. Trump said that Sheinbaum had agreed to "effectively closing" the Mexico–U.S. border to avoid tariffs; Sheinbaum denied this, but said that "there will not be a potential tariff war". After Trump signed executive orders imposing 25 percent tariffs, Sheinbaum said Mexico would implement tariff and non-tariff retaliatory measures against the United States. She said the retaliation was "in defense of Mexico's interests". Sheinbaum did not specify which U.S. goods Mexico's retaliation would target, though media reports claimed Mexico had been preparing possible retaliatory tariffs ranging from 5 percent to 20 percent on pork, cheese, produce, steel, and aluminum; reports also claimed that Mexico intended to exempt the automotive industry from tariffs.

Marcelo Ebrard, Mexico's secretary of economy, called Trump's tariffs a "flagrant violation" of the USMCA. Sheinbaum also responded to Trump's claim that she has an alliance with the Mexican drug cartels, calling it "slander". At an event on February 1, she said Mexico would keep a "cool head" in proceeding with its retaliations, and she proposed establishing a task force with the U.S. to address Trump's issues with Mexico and said that "problems are not resolved by imposing tariffs".

== One-month delay ==
On February 3, 2025, Sheinbaum and Trump mutually agreed to delay the tariffs on Mexico by one month, until March 4. Sheinbaum accepted sending 10,000 troops from the Mexican National Guard to their border to prevent drug trafficking. Trump said the U.S. had pledged to take measures to curb weapons trafficking to Mexico. During their call, Trump complemented Sheinbaum, telling her "You're tough". After their call, Sheinbaum directed Mexican law enforcement agencies to target fentanyl gangs, and Mexican police raided opioid labs and arrested cartel members. On February 27, Mexico transferred 29 cartel operatives, Sinaloa Cartel founding member Rafael Caro Quintero, to the United States to face criminal charges there. Sheinbaum's calm demeanor during calls with Trump and success in mitigating illegal immigration and fentanyl appeared to earn the respect of Trump and impressed members of his administration, including Stephen Miller, who is Trump's deputy chief of staff for policy and the U.S. homeland security advisor. Trump later described Sheinbaum as "a wonderful woman" with whom he has a "very good" relationship.

=== Subsequent tariff threats ===
On February 10, 2025, Trump imposed 25 percent tariffs on steel and aluminum entering the United States from all countries, including Canada and Mexico, which provide most of the U.S.'s metal imports. The steel and aluminum tariffs are set to enter force on March 12. Trump said those tariffs were "the first of many", and that over the next four weeks, he would discuss tariffs on cars, pharmaceuticals, chips, and other goods with his team. In response, Trudeau called the tariffs "unacceptable" and said he hoped talks with the Trump administration would resolve the issue, but that Canada will have a "firm and clear" response if needed. Shares of U.S. steelmakers rose in response to Trump's order, while prices for steel and aluminum rose.

== Imposition of tariffs ==
On March 3, Trump said that the tariffs that were delayed from February would take effect as planned on March 4, and that there was "no room left" for Canada or Mexico to negotiate a last-minute deal with the United States to delay them further. Lutnick said that both Canada and Mexico had made progress on improving border security, but that neither had satisfied the U.S.'s demands to halt the flow of fentanyl into the United States. Sheinbaum reaffirmed that Mexico's prior response plans would take effect when Trump's tariffs were imposed. U.S. tariffs on Canada and Mexico began as scheduled, at 12:01 a.m. Eastern Time on March 4.

The onset of the tariffs led to stock market declines in the U.S., especially for retailers and car manufacturers. On March 5, Lutnick said Trump was "listening to the offers from Mexico and Canada" and "thinking about trying to do something in the middle", suggesting that tariffs could take effect at a less significant scale. Later that day, Trump granted a one-month exception from the tariffs for automakers compliant with USMCA regulations, which represent about 85 percent of passenger vehicles imported to the U.S. from Mexico in 2024. Trump decided after meeting with executives from the three largest U.S. automakers—Ford, General Motors, and Stellantis—who said that the tariffs would harm U.S. companies more than their foreign rivals.

After the U.S. tariffs took effect on March 4, Sheinbaum said she would announce Mexico's countermeasures, including retaliatory tariffs, on March 9. She cited plans to speak with Trump in the intervening days as the reason for her delayed response. Sheinbaum said that if the tariffs persisted, Mexico would "reach out to Canada and other nations" and could look for trading partners other than the U.S. or shift trade alliances "if necessary".

Trump and Sheinbaum spoke by phone on March 6. Sheinbaum began the call by listing to Trump her efforts to secure the Mexico–U.S. border and fight fentanyl trafficking, suggesting to him that the tariffs would make it more difficult for her to justify cooperation with the U.S. to a domestic audience. She sent Trump a chart showing how fentanyl seizures at the border had dropped dramatically since the 10,000 National Guard troops had arrived. During the call, Trump complimented Sheinbaum and asked her opinion of Trudeau, calling her "lucky" after she responded that they rarely talked. While Sheinbaum recounted that Trump initially refused to lift tariffs, by the end of their call Trump offered exclusions for many Mexican goods.

=== USMCA exemption ===
After speaking to Sheinbaum, Trump posted on social media that he would delay tariffs on all USMCA-compliant goods until April 2 "out of respect" for Sheinbaum, and thanked her for her "hard work and cooperation". Immediately afterward, Sheinbaum wrote on Twitter that she and Trump had an "excellent and respectful" call and thanked Trump, saying the two had "agreed that our work and collaboration have yielded unprecedented results".

Trudeau and Trump had spoken by phone on March 5, and Trump said their conversation ended on a "somewhat 'friendly'" note. After Sheinbaum's call, Trump extended the delay of tariffs on USMCA-compliant products to Canada on March 6. After Trump's announcement, Canadian officials said that the planned increases in their retaliatory tariffs would be suspended, though the initial tariffs on the U.S. would remain in place.

Although only about 50 percent of U.S. imports from Mexico and 38 percent of U.S. imports from Canada were USMCA-compliant in 2024, many companies had not filed the requisite paperwork because previous tariff levels were so low. Both Canada and Mexico believed that nearly all of their exports would be quickly made compliant. The Royal Bank of Canada estimated that almost 90% of Canadian exports entered the U.S. duty free in April 2025, and by August said 100% of Canadian energy exports and 95% of other exports were compliant with the trade pact.

=== US trade laws ===
There are several laws potentially allowing the U.S. administration to impose tariffs on foreign goods:

- The International Emergency Economic Powers Act (IEEPA) has been used by the U.S. administration to impose tariffs on Canada, Mexico and China for not stopping the smuggling of fentanyl into the U.S., and to impose "Liberation Day" or "reciprocal" tariffs on most on countries in the world. The U.S. administration claimed IEEPA as the legal authority to impose such tariffs even though IEEPA does not explicitly mention tariffs. Some U.S. importers disputed the administration's interpretation of IEEPA. The president invoked IEEPA on short notice without any preliminary investigation. The administration exempted goods covered under the United States-Mexico-Canada free-trade agreement (USMCA) from IEEPA tariffs. However, in February 2026, the U.S. Supreme Court ruled that a president could not use IEEPA to impose tariffs.
- Section 232 of the U.S. Trade Expansion Act of 1962 allows the US president to impose tariffs on specific foreign industries after an investigation by the Department of Commerce. This has been used to impose tariffs on steel (50 percent), aluminum (50 percent), and autos (25 percent excluding U.S. content), severely affecting these Canadian industries.
- Section 301 of Trade Act of 1974 allows tariffs on all products of a country following an investigation into unfair trade practices. This section has been used against China.
- Section 122 of the Trade Act of 1974 allows tariffs of up to 15 per cent for 150 days, after which Congressional approval is required to extend them. After the U.S. Supreme Court ruled against the IEEPA tariffs, the administration invoked section 122 tariffs and used the 150-day period to conduct investigations under section 301. The section 122 tariffs expired on July 24, 2026, and section 301 tariffs went into effect.
- Section 338 of the Tariff Act of 1930, also known as the Smoot–Hawley Tariff Act, allows tariffs of up to 50 per cent where countries have allegedly discriminated against U.S. businesses. No investigation is required and such tariffs have no expiry date. In August 2026, the U.S. levied section 338 tariffs of 50 percent against a variety of Canadian goods representing 5 percent of Canada's exports to the U.S. This was in reaction against Canada's counter-tariffs against the U.S.

== Course of the trade war ==
On March 9, the day Sheinbaum had planned to announce Mexico's retaliation, she held an event in Mexico City's central plaza to celebrate the delay on the U.S. tariffs, which tens of thousands of Mexicans attended. Sheinbaum said during the event that "Fortunately, dialogue and respect have prevailed" and they she was optimistic that Mexico would not be given further tariffs and that she would negotiate with Trump with a "cool head".

On April 2, when Trump imposed universal 10 percent tariffs on imports from all countries, Canada and Mexico were exempted; the countries faced no new tariffs from the U.S. and the exemption given to most USMCA-compliant goods was extended indefinitely. The same day, the U.S. Senate narrowly approved a measure that would revoke some of Trump's tariffs on Canada. Four senators from the Republican Party (Susan Collins, Lisa Murkowski, Rand Paul and Mitch McConnell) joined all senators of the opposition Democratic Party in passing the resolution. However, the measure also needs to pass the Republican-controlled House of Representatives to take effect, in which Republican leaders have much more power to block said measure.

Sheinbaum said that Mexico had been given "preferential treatment" by the U.S. and that Canada and Mexico had avoided additional tariffs because of the USMCA. She added that U.S. and Mexican officials had a "mutual respect" relationship. Mexican economy secretary Ebrard said that the worldwide U.S. tariffs could help Mexico by making it cheaper to do business there relative to other countries. Despite Canada's exclusion, Carney denounced the tariffs and said they would "rupture the global economy" and harm economic growth. He also said he would seek to assemble a "coalition of like-minded countries" to create an alternative to the U.S., and that "if the United States no longer wants to lead, Canada will". He declared: "The 80-year period when the United States embraced the mantle of global economic leadership, when it forged alliances rooted in trust and mutual respect and championed the free and open exchange of goods and services, is over. While this is a tragedy, it is also the new reality."

Trump announced universal 25 percent tariffs on automobiles and automobile parts on March 27, which came into effect on April 3. When the U.S. tariffs began, Carney announced that Canada would retaliate with a 25 percent tariff on U.S. cars and trucks imported into Canada and that Canada would use the money generated from the tariffs to support people and businesses negatively impacted by U.S. tariffs. Sheinbaum said that the U.S. auto export tariffs were a concern for Mexico and that she hoped to continue speaking to U.S. officials to lower tariffs on auto exports, steel, and aluminum. Rather than retaliating with tariffs, however, Sheinbaum announced that Mexico would try to mitigate the impact of the tariffs by increasing domestic production of corn, beans, and rice, in addition to fuel and refined oil products to reduce its dependence on U.S. natural gas.

On April 11, Trump threatened Mexico with further tariffs and sanctions, saying that it was violating its obligation under the 1944 treaty between the two countries relating to water resources in the Tijuana, Colorado, and Rio Grande rivers. Despite the treaty requiring that Mexico deliver to the United States 1.75 million acre-feet of water every five years, it had offered less than 500,000 from October 2020 to December 2024. Trump accused Mexico of "stealing the water from Texas farmers". Sheinbaum acknowledged that Mexico had failed to fulfill its commitments under the treaty: She said that the 2020–2023 North American drought had prevented Mexico from providing the full amount of water, but that "to the extent of water availability, Mexico has been complying". Sheinbaum said that Mexico had sent "a comprehensive proposal" to the U.S. to resolve the issue, and said that "I am sure that, as in other matters, an agreement will be reached". On April 28, Mexico and the U.S. jointly announced an agreement in which Mexico would immediately transfer some of its water reserves to the United States and give the country a larger share of the water from the Rio Grande through October 2025, and Mexico said the U.S. had agreed not to seek renegotiation of the 1944 water treaty.

== Reactions and responses ==
The tariffs could affect negotiations on renewing the USMCA, for which a review is due in 2026. Trump has ordered U.S. officials to review and report how to correct "unfair" trade practices by April 1, 2025. Canadian officials have grown concerned that Trump may threaten tariffs to force changes to the agreement.

In the United States, a February 2025 survey by The Harris Poll for Bloomberg News found that around 60 percent of Americans believe that high tariffs could cause consumer prices to rise. The following month, a poll by the University of Michigan found that the number of Americans expressing confidence in the economy fell by 11 percent in March 2025, and that the number expecting inflation rose. In the United States, Trump's initial decision to impose tariffs on Canada and Mexico was criticized by the editorial board of The Wall Street Journal, which said that his "justification for this economic assault on the neighbors makes no sense" and that Trump had begun "the dumbest trade war in history".

Many Americans believe Trump's threats to annex Canada are a joke or a negotiation strategy, and Trump's tariff policy in general raised questions about whether he has a serious intent to impose tariffs or whether his orders to impose them are threats intended only to serve as a negotiation tactic. The imposition and rollback of tariffs created uncertainty for many businesses, and has led to an erosion of international confidence in the U.S. as a reliable trade partner.

According to Deutsche Welle, Trump's imposition of tariffs on Canada and Mexico violated both the USMCA and the rules of the World Trade Organization (WTO), of which all three countries are members. On March 13, 2025, the WTO said that Canada had formally requested to begin dispute resolution proceedings with the United States, saying that the tariffs violated the U.S.'s commitments under the 1994 General Agreement on Tariffs and Trade. On April 7, Canada also initiated WTO dispute resolution proceedings regarding the U.S. tariffs on cars and car parts.

In Mexico, the government and local businesses aimed to bolster a "Made in Mexico" campaign to promote domestic products. Some Mexicans called for boycotts of U.S. products after Trump's initial threat of tariffs, and a poll by the Mexican firm Buendía & Márquez found that 80 percent of Mexicans held a negative opinion of Trump in mid-February 2025, an increase from 66 percent in early January. Sheinbaum's approval rating also rose, with some polls in February 2025 suggesting that it exceeds 80 percent.

The European Commission—the executive branch of the European Union—condemned U.S. tariffs on Canada and Mexico, and called for the U.S. to "reconsider its approach".

== Economic impact ==
=== Stock market ===
The trade war led investors to fear that tariffs could create inflation by causing rises in both manufacturing costs and consumer prices, leading to volatility in the U.S. stock market. Trump has characterized the economy as being in "period of transition" for the start of his presidency. On March 3, after Trump confirmed the imposition of tariffs on Canada and Mexico, as well as the increase of tariffs on China from 10 percent to 20 percent set to take place the same day, the U.S. stock markets dropped considerably: the S&P 500 index fell by 1.8 percent, while the Nasdaq-100 index fell by 2.6 percent. By March 6, the S&P 500 had lost almost all of its gains since November 2024.

On March 9, Trump declined to say whether his policies could lead to a recession in the United States. He said in an interview with Fox News that it would take time to see the payoff from his policies, but that they would ultimately be worthwhile, saying "If you look at China, they have a 100-year perspective. We have a quarter. We go by quarters, and you can't go by that. You have to do what's right." The next day, the S&P 500 dropped an additional 2.7 percent—its largest single-day drop of 2025—and the Nasdaq by 4 percent. On March 10, the S&P 500 fell by 1.4 percent, pushing it into a correction, which is defined as a fall in a stock market index of over 10 percent from its peak; the S&P 500 was 10.1 percent lower than its record high, which was on February 19. The market's losses were equivalent to over US$4 trillion in value; the Nasdaq-100 and Russell 2000 indices had already entered corrections. On March 11, the S&P 500 rose by 2.1 percent, exiting a correction, though ending the week down 2.3 percent. After Trump's April 2 tariffs, the S&P 500 fell over 10 percent in two days, in its worst week since the COVID-19 recession of 2020.

In Canada and Mexico, stock markets were more stable. By March 6, Mexico's most prominent stock market index, the Índice de Precios y Cotizaciones, had risen 6 percent since the beginning of 2025. Canada's benchmark index, the S&P/TSX, was almost the same level it began the year.

=== Prospective effects ===
The trade war is expected to significantly disrupt trade between the United States, Mexico, and Canada and upend supply chains across North America. Many economists have expressed skepticism over the effectiveness of Trump's strategy in imposing tariffs, and many have said that increased tariffs would raise the prices of consumer goods in the U.S. and worsen the country's cost-of-living crisis. The Budget Lab at Yale University estimated that the tariffs would lead to a loss of about US$1,200 in purchasing power for the typical American household. While some companies will opt to bear the cost of the tariff, others are likely to raise prices on consumer products to offset lost revenue or attempt to negotiate lower prices for their products.

Because the United States does not produce enough oil to satisfy its demand, 10 percent tariffs on Canadian oil and energy will likely lead to an increased oil price across the United States. This is especially true in the Midwest, a region heavily reliant on oil imported from Alberta. The Canadian government had previously said that U.S. gas prices could increase by US$0.75 per gallon overnight if tariffs were imposed. Tariffs could also increase the cost of electricity in some U.S. states, especially those that rely on Canadian provinces like Ontario, Quebec, and British Columbia for energy. Outside North America, tariffs on energy imports would give European and Asian oil refineries a competitive advantage against their rivals.

The tariffs could also lead to price increases in various U.S. imports from Mexico and Canada, including fruits, vegetables, beer, liquor, and electronics from Mexico and potatoes, grains, lumber, and steel from Canada. Price increases would compound with high inflation in the U.S., especially in grocery prices. The cost of Canadian lumber, used by many homebuilders in the U.S., would also likely increase. The tariffs would also cause risk to the U.S. farming and fishing industries.

The tariffs pose a risk of "severe recession" in Mexico if maintained. A year-long 25 percent tariff could cause Mexican exports to fall by around 12 percent, ultimately leading to a 4 percent decline in the country's gross domestic product in 2025. The American Chamber of Commerce in Mexico, the group representing U.S. companies in the country, said tariffs would harm both economies and "fail to address the real challenges of security, migration and drug trafficking". The Mexican automobile industry is likely to be most susceptible to upheaval from the tariffs, alongside the electric equipment sector, making it the largest beneficiary of the reprieve given to USMCA-compliant car imports.
