= Governorship of Rick Perry =

Rick Perry's tenure as the 47th Governor of Texas

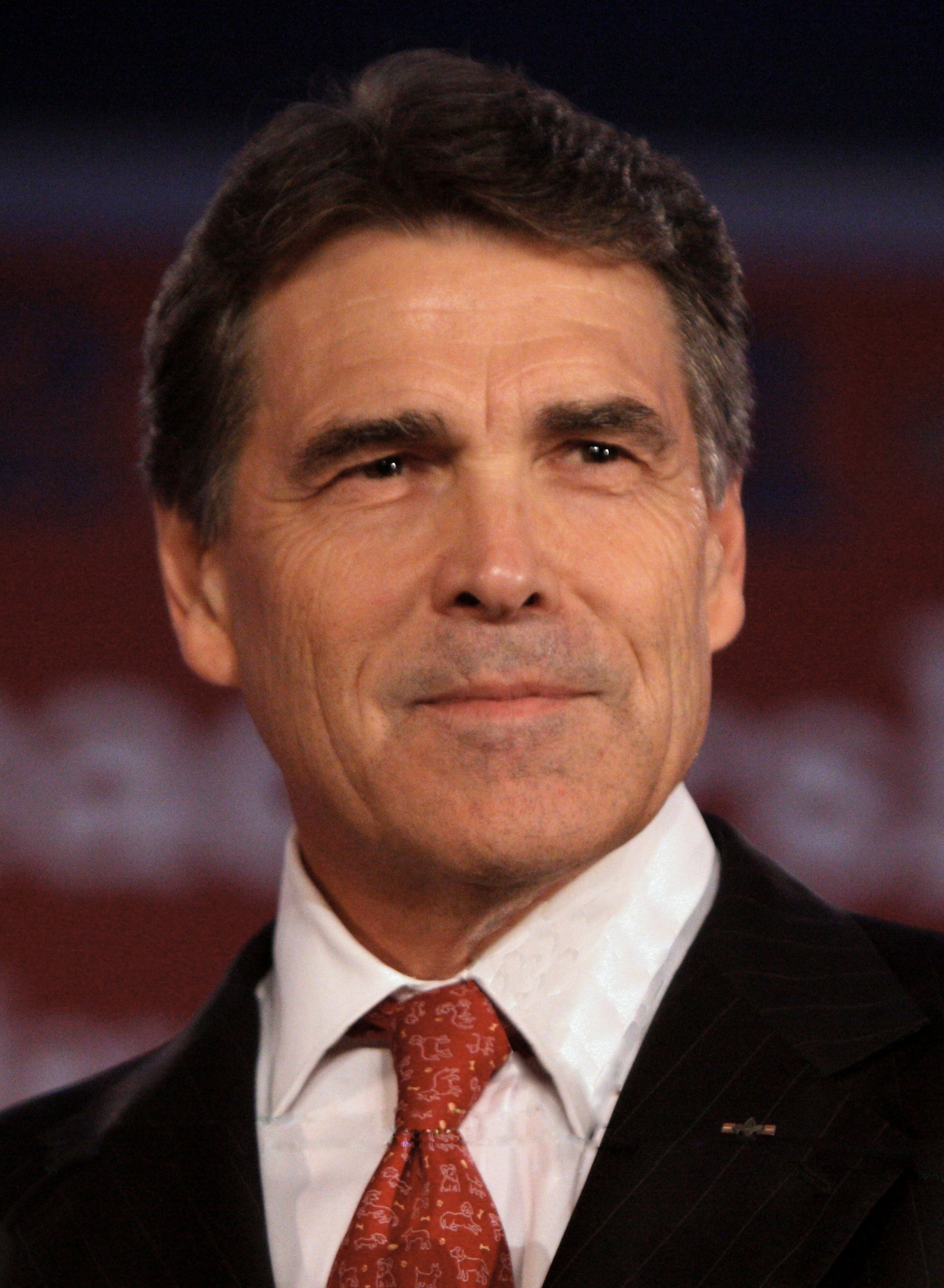
- Governorship of Rick Perry; December 21, 2000 – January 20, 2015
- Party: Republican
- Election: 2002; 2006; 2010
- Seat: Governor's Mansion
- Seal of Texas

Rick Perry, having served as the lieutenant governor of Texas from January 1999 to December 2000, succeeded to the office of Governor of Texas on December 21, 2000, when Governor George W. Bush resigned to prepare for his presidential inauguration. Perry became the first Texas A&M graduate to serve as governor. Perry was a member of the Republican Governors Association, the National Governors Association, the Western Governors Association, and the Southern Governors Association. Perry served as Chairman of the Republican Governors Association in 2008 and 2011.

Perry's public relations office promoted the position that he advocated an emphasis on accountability, raised expectations, and funded programs that worked to improve the quality of Texas schools.

Perry's campaigns for lieutenant governor and governor focused on a tough stance on crime. In June 2002, he vetoed a ban on the execution of intellectually disabled inmates. He has also supported block grants for crime programs.

Perry has also supported tort reform to limit malpractice lawsuits against doctors, and as lieutenant governor he had tried and failed to limit class action awards and allowing plaintiffs to allocate liability awards among several defendants. In 2003, Perry sponsored a controversial state constitutional amendment to cap medical malpractice awards, which was narrowly approved by voters. According to a tort reform advocate, this legislation has resulted in a 21.3 percent decrease in malpractice insurance rates. According to the Texas Medical Board, there has also been a significant increase in the number of doctors seeking to practice in the state.

Perry has drawn attention for his criticism of the Obama administration's handling of the Great Recession, and for turning down approximately $555 million in stimulus money for unemployment insurance. Perry was lauded by the Texas Public Policy Foundation for this decision and his justification – that the funds and the mandatory changes to state law would have placed an enduring tax burden on employers. In September 2009, Perry declared that Texas was recession-proof: "As a matter of fact ... someone had put a report out that the first state that's coming out of the recession is going to be the state of Texas ... I said, 'We're in one?'" Paul Burka, senior executive editor of Texas Monthly, criticized Perry's remarks, saying "You cannot be callous and cavalier when people are losing their jobs and their homes."

The Los Angeles Times reported on August 16, 2011, that Perry received $37 million over 10 years from just 150 donors, which adds up to over a third of the $102 million he had raised as governor through December 2010, according to the group Texans for Public Justice. Almost half of those donors received big contracts, tax breaks or appointments during Perry's tenure.

On July 8, 2013, Perry announced he would not seek reelection to an unprecedented fourth full four-year term in the election in November 2014, during a press conference at Holt Caterpillar in San Antonio, Texas with family and friends present.

== Elections ==
=== 2002 ===
Perry won the office in his own right in the 2002 gubernatorial election when he defeated Laredo businessman Tony Sanchez, polling 2,632,591 votes (57.80 percent) to Sanchez's 1,819,798 (39.96 percent). Four minor party candidates shared 2.21 percent of the vote.

=== 2006 ===
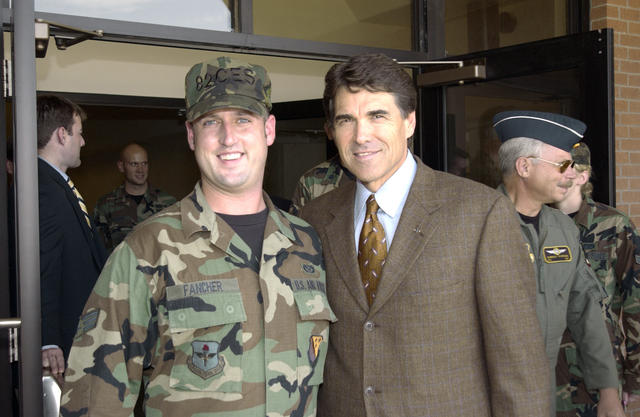
Rick Perry touring Sheppard AFB, Wichita Falls, Texas, on August 28, 2004

The 2006 gubernatorial election proved to be a stiffer challenge for Perry than his 2002 campaign. Though he easily defeated token opposition in the primary election, Perry faced three major opponents: former Democratic Congressman Chris Bell, as well as two major independent candidates – outgoing Republican state Comptroller Carole Keeton Strayhorn and well-known Texas country music singer Kinky Friedman. Perry won the race in a plurality, polling 1,714,618 votes (39 percent) to Bell's 1,309,774 (29.8 percent), Strayhorn's 789,432 (18 percent), Friedman's 553,327 (12.6 percent), with a Libertarian candidate and a write-in independent garnering another 27,444 votes (0.6 percent). Perry became only the third governor in state history to have been elected by a plurality of less than 40 percent of votes cast (the 1853 and 1861 races also featured plurality winners carrying under 40 percent).

Late in the 2006 campaign, the Republican Governors Association received one million dollars from Houston businessman Bob Perry (no relation), and the association thereafter contributed the same amount to Rick Perry. Bell brought suit, contending that the Bob Perry donations had been improperly channeled through the association to conceal their source. In 2010, the Rick Perry campaign paid Bell $426,000 to settle the suit.

=== 2010 ===
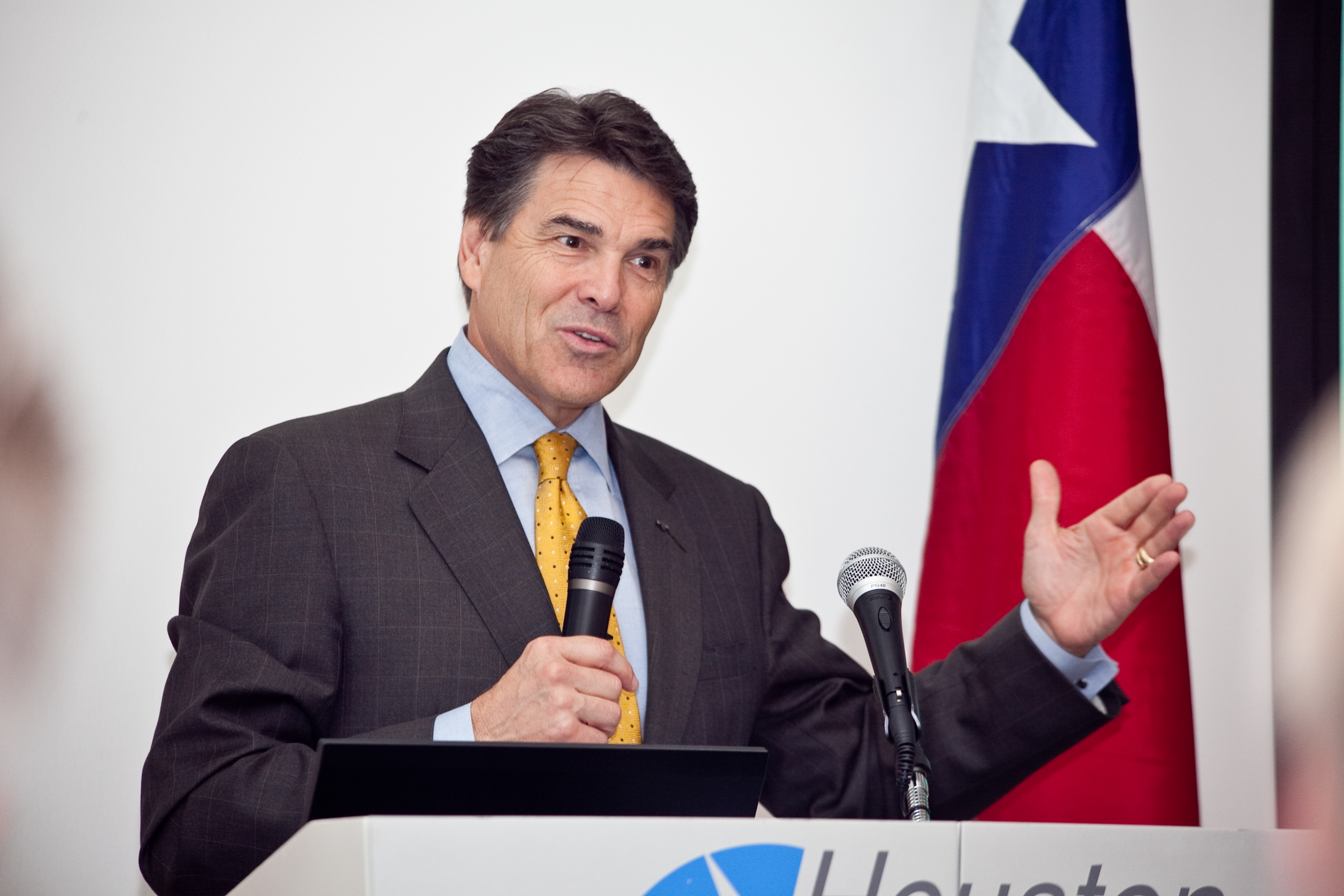
Perry in September 2010

In April 2008, Perry announced his intent to run for re-election. Perry defeated Senator Hutchison and Debra Medina in the March 2, 2010, primary election, becoming the Republican nominee. He faced Democratic nominee William Howard "Bill" White, the former mayor of Houston. During the general election campaign, Perry refused to debate White until White released his tax returns from 1995, his last year as deputy energy secretary in the Clinton administration. White released his tax returns for his six years as mayor of Houston. According to his spokesperson, White had taxes withheld from his $133,000 salary in 1995, the amount of which was offset by losses in the starting of an energy business.

On November 2, 2010, Perry handily won re-election to an unprecedented third four-year term in the general election. He carried 226 out of 254 counties and polled 2,733,784 votes (54.97 percent) to White's 2,102,606 votes (42.28 percent). Perry made history by becoming the first Texas governor to be elected to three four-year terms and the fourth to serve three terms since Shivers, Price Daniel, and John Connally; his third term began on January 18, 2011.

The Koch network gave Rick Perry $76,000 in 2010, in relation to the Texas Gubernatorial elections.

== Economy ==
Since the beginning of his presidential campaign, Perry has made what he calls the economic success of Texas the centerpiece of his campaign. According to Perry and his supporters, the state economy has improved as a result of his policy, including the lack of an income tax and predictable regulation. Others, meanwhile, have questioned whether the Texan economy is truly as successful as Perry claims.

As of August 2011, Texas has an 8.2% unemployment rate. In comparison, the national unemployment rate was 9.1% in August 2011. 25 states have a lower unemployment rate than Texas, and 25 states (including the District of Columbia) have a higher unemployment rate, meaning that Texas has median unemployment among U.S. states. Between June 2009 and August 2011, 237,000 jobs were created in Texas. But when comparing population growth to the unemployment rate the influx of new job seekers has caused the UI rate to appear to be changing only slowly, when in fact the job creation rate has kept pace, or exceeded the influx of new population.

According to a March 28, 2011 report by the Bureau of Labor Statistics, 9.54% of hourly-paid workers in Texas are paid at or below minimum wage. In comparison, the national percentage is 6.0%. Among the 50 U.S. states and the District of Columbia, Texas has the highest percentage of workers paid at or below minimum wage; the state with the second-highest percentage is Mississippi, with 9.50%.

As of 2011, 26% of the Texan population does not have health insurance. In comparison, the statistic among the entire U.S. is 17%.

Paul Krugman, a recipient of the Nobel Prize in Economics, attributed Texas' job growth to its growing population, which he said decreased wages and attracted businesses to the state. According to Krugman, the high population growth in the state was due to a high birth rate, immigration from Mexico, and internal migration of other Americans, due to the warm weather and low cost of living – especially the low housing prices from less restrictive zoning policies, which he described as the "one area where Texas does in fact do something right."

Perry's defenders responded by stating that the median hourly wage is 93% of the national average, and wages have increased at 3.4% in 2010

Several of the business leaders who moved to Texas have ascribed their decision partly to business-friendly policies (including the lack of income tax, low regulation, anti-union laws, and financial incentives), and partly to the convenient Texas geography in the middle of the country with transportation hubs, a large bilingual population, mild winters and abundant space.

== Fiscal policy ==
Perry, a proclaimed proponent of fiscal conservatism, has often campaigned on tax reform and job growth. Perry opposed creating a Texas state income tax and increasing sales tax rates, choosing instead to increase user fees and debt, adding $2 billion for road bonds, borrowing from the Federal Unemployment Trust Fund and adding surcharges to various traffic offenses, protected the state's "Rainy Day fund", balanced the state budget as required by state law, and was reelected on a platform to reduce property taxes that rose with the inflation of property values in the late 1990s and the 21st century. As Governor of Texas, Perry received grades of B in 2004, B in 2006, B in 2008, B in 2010, C in 2012, and B in 2014 from the Cato Institute, a libertarian think tank, in their biennial Fiscal Policy Report Card on America's Governors.

=== Tax policy ===
In 2002, although his Democratic opponent pledged to never raise taxes, Perry refused to make such a promise. In 2009, however, Perry signed Grover Norquist's pledge to "oppose and veto any and all efforts to increase taxes".

In early 2006, Perry signed legislation that delivered a $15.7 billion reduction in property taxes while raising other taxes such as a state franchise tax. The tax was condemned as a "back door" state income tax by many organizations. Perry claimed that the bill would save the average taxpayer $2,000 in property taxes. Critics contended that Perry inflated these numbers; the actual tax savings, some sources said, would average only $150 per family in the first year, and $1,350 over a three-year period.

In 2004, Perry proposed a number of tax increases to pay for public schools, including a tax on strip clubs. The "pole tax" idea went nowhere until 2007, when the Legislature approved a $5 per patron fee. The measure subsequently became tied up in litigation as the adult entertainment industry sued citing performers' First Amendment rights.

=== Industrial policy ===
In 2003, Perry signed legislation that created the Texas Enterprise Fund to enhance the development of the Texas economy. In 2004, he authorized the fund to grant $20 million to Countrywide Financial in return for a promise "to create 7,500 new jobs in the state by 2010." Critics argue those jobs would have been created with or without tax payer money. The grant (all of which are approved by the Governor, the Lieutenant Governor and Speaker of the House) is one of the largest made from the fund in terms of the size and the number of jobs promised. In the fall of 2007, while slashing jobs and with its stock price plummeting, Countrywide assured Perry's office that the company "believed" it would meet its 2010 commitment only to be acquired in a fire sale two months later by Bank of America. Thanks to the "claw-back" provisions in the program, grantees return funds to the state for jobs not created.

The Texas Enterprise Fund has given $435 million in grants to businesses since 2003. The Texas Emerging Technology Fund has given nearly $200 million to businesses since 2005. The New York Times reported that more than a quarter of the companies that have received grants from the enterprise fund in the most recent fiscal year, or their chief executives, made contributions to either Mr. Perry's campaign dating back to 2001 or to the Republican Governors Association since 2008. For example, John McHale, Austin, Texas, gave millions of dollars to Democratic candidates and causes, but 2 years ago wrote a $50,000 check to Perry, then seeking a third term as governor, and in September 2010, wrote another $50,000 check. In May 2010 an economic development fund administered by the governor's office gave $3 million to G-Con, a pharmaceutical start-up that Mr. McHale helped start. At least two other executives with connections to G-Con had also given Mr. Perry tens of thousands of dollars.

Perry has appointed at least four top donors or fund-raisers to the board of the Teacher Retirement System, a $110 billion pension fund. Perry's trustees encouraged the fund to invest more money with hedge funds and private equity firms whose investors, officers, or partners were Perry donors.

=== Staff expenses ===
In June 2010, Perry went on a 12-day trade mission to East Asia. The security detail for the trip cost $129,000 in state money. The Texas Government attempted to block the media's scrutiny of the use of the funds as they contained information that could compromise the future security of the state's senior executive. A member of White's gubernatorial campaign stated that Perry should, "stop hiding the facts on fiscal issues like what he's charging taxpayers for travel". Perry's campaign countered that the trip led to greater exposure for Texas business opportunities in Asia. In all, Perry made 23 foreign trips from 2004 to 2010, including a vacation on Grand Cayman and an education policy retreat in The Bahamas. The state paid only 1% of the travel expenses for these excursions, but security details for all trips combined cost over $1 million in state money. Perry's chief of staff remarked that the trips were "good business sense" as they enhanced the profile of Texan goods and services in foreign markets. White's campaign, however, accused Perry of staging the trips for self-promotion.

== Social policy ==
Perry is anti-abortion and opposes government funding for elective abortions. In 2003, Perry signed the Prenatal Protection Act, which explicitly included fetuses in its definition of human life.

In May 2011, Perry signed a "Mandatory Ultrasound Bill" which stipulates that, prior to every abortion, the abortion practitioner or a certified sonographer must perform a sonogram before any sedative or anesthesia is administered. Before every abortion, the abortion practitioner must give an explanation of the sonogram images of the unborn child. The woman has the right to waive the explanation only in cases of rape, incest, fetal abnormality, and judicial bypass for a minor. The abortion practitioner must also allow the woman to see the sonogram images of the unborn child and hear the heartbeat along with a verbal explanation of the heartbeat before an abortion can be administered. Critics stated that the law was "government intrusion", pointing out that in the first trimester, only transvaginal sonograms (in which a probe is inserted up the woman's vagina) can be performed, and stated that such a procedure would be inappropriate for victims of incest or rape, which the law does not exempt.

Also in 2011, Perry signed a bill that prohibited taxpayer funding for Planned Parenthood, along with a bill that created a "Choose Life" license plate to promote infant adoption in Texas.

=== HPV vaccine controversy ===
On February 2, 2007, Perry issued an executive order mandating that Texas girls receive HPV vaccine that protects against some strains of the human papilloma virus, a contributing factor to some forms of cervical cancer. The order provided vaccination free of charge to those who were not covered by insurance, and included an opt-out provision for parents. At the time of the order, Gardasil, a newly approved drug manufactured by Merck, was the only HPV vaccine approved by the Food and Drug Administration. The move made national headlines, and apparent financial connections between Merck and Perry were reported by news outlets, such as a $6,000 campaign contribution and Merck's hiring of former Perry Chief of Staff Mike Toomey to handle its Texas lobbying work and Perry's "current chief of staff's mother-in-law, Texas Republican state Rep. Dianne White Delisi [as] state director for Women in Government".

In May 2007, the Texas Legislature passed a bill to undo Perry's executive order. Perry did not veto it, saying the Legislature would have sufficient time and votes to override his veto.

== Gun ownership ==
Perry has an A+ rating from the NRA Political Victory Fund. He possesses a Concealed Handgun License (CHL), and in 2005, he signed a number of bills that, among other things, reduced CHL fees for military veterans and senior citizens, reduced the CHL age requirement from 21 to 18 for members of the military, exempted military veterans from taking the range portion of the CHL licensing process (if they had been weapons certified in the military within the past five years), and extended the renewal period for a CHL from four to five years. In 2007, Perry signed castle doctrine legislation, enhancing a person's legal right to use deadly force in self-defense against an intruder within one's place of residence.

In 2011, Perry criticized the U.S. Department of Justice's creation of a reporting requirement for purchases of semi-automatic rifles within the four states bordering Mexico, saying "... the Obama administration should target actual criminals rather than law-abiding citizens and immediately secure our southern border against the northbound and southbound illegal smuggling of drugs, humans, cash, guns, fugitives and stolen vehicles."

== Vetoes ==
Perry set a record in the 2001 legislative session for the use of the veto: he rejected legislation a total of 82 times, more than any other governor in any single legislative session in the history of the state since Reconstruction. Perry's use of the veto drew criticism from some in the 2002 gubernatorial campaign, having used the veto only nine fewer times than preceding Governor George W. Bush had during three legislative sessions and 22 times more than Ann Richards cast in two sessions. In the two legislative sessions following the 2001 session, Perry was more conservative in his use of the veto, employing it 51 times. As of 2011, he had used the veto 273 times, more than any other Texas governor.

== Trans-Texas Corridor ==
In January 2001, Perry proposed the Trans-Texas Corridor, a $145+ billion-dollar project that would build multi-lane highways, rail lines and data lines from Oklahoma to Mexico, and from east to west in southern Texas. Instead of paying for the project with taxes, Perry proposed that it be partially financed, partially built and wholly operated by private contractors who, in exchange for a multibillion-dollar investment, would receive all toll proceeds, notably Cintra, a Spanish-owned company, and its minority partner, San Antonio-based Zachry Construction Corporation, one of Texas' largest road construction companies. Some of the more controversial aspects of the project include tolls, private operation of toll collections (at rates set by local municipalities), and extensive use of eminent domain (or the option for landowners to maintain a lucrative equity stake in the project) to acquire property.

Opponents portrayed the proposal as a "land grab", and criticized Perry for opposing the public release of the actual terms of the 50-year deal with Cintra to the public for fear they would chill the possibility of the company's investment; Perry's former liaison to the legislature, former State Senator Dan Shelly, returned to his consulting/lobbying work with Cintra after securing the TTC deal while on the state payroll. All of Perry's gubernatorial opponents opposed the corridor project, as did the 2006 state party platforms of both the Democratic and Republicans parties. After much contentious debate between supporters and opponents, an official decision of "no action" was issued by the Federal Highway Administration on July 20, 2010, formally ending the project.

In 2001, Perry appointed Ric Williamson of Weatherford, an old friend and former legislative colleague, to the Texas Transportation Commission. Williamson became the commission chairman in 2004 and worked for the improvement of the state's transportation infrastructure until his sudden death of a heart attack on December 30, 2007.

== Death penalty ==
Perry supports the death penalty. On June 2, 2009, Texas carried out the 200th execution since Perry assumed the office of governor. As of August 10, 2011, Texas has carried out 234 executions since Rick Perry became governor. By the end of Rick Perry governorship in 2015. Texas saw a record 279 executions.

Under the Texas Constitution, the governor is not permitted to grant pardon, parole, or to commute a death penalty sentence to life imprisonment on his own initiative (the Constitution was changed in 1936 due to concerns that pardons were being sold for cash under the administrations of former Governor James E. Ferguson and later his wife and Texas' first female Governor Miriam A. Ferguson). Instead, all requests for pardon, parole, and commutation are channeled through the Board of Pardons and Paroles who then reviews each application and makes a recommendation to the governor. Although the Governor can accept or reject a positive recommendation of commutation or pardon from the Board of Pardons and Paroles, he has no power to override a negative recommendation. The only unilateral action which the Governor can take is to grant a one-time, 30-day reprieve to the defendant.

=== Execution of Cameron Todd Willingham ===
Cameron Todd Willingham was a Texas man whose three young children died in a 1991 fire at the family home in Corsicana, Texas. Willingham, accused of having set the fire, was convicted of murder and was executed in 2004. Shortly before the execution and after several years of unsuccessful appeals, arson expert Gerald Hurst filed a report advising the 7-member Board of Pardons and Paroles that the investigation of the case had not been based on good science and that there was no proof of arson, but the Board of Pardons and Paroles declined to recommend clemency to the governor. Perry did not use his authority to grant a one-time, 30-day reprieve to Willingham. Willingham's case gained renewed attention in 2009 after The New Yorker published a story that drew upon the investigations of Hurst and anti-death penalty advocate Elizabeth Gilbert.

In 2005, Texas established a nine-member Texas Forensic Science Commission (TFSC). As part of the Commission's inquiry into the Willingham case, another fire scientist wrote a report that agreed with Gerald Hurst that the charge of arson could not be sustained given the available evidence. Two days before the Commission was to hold a hearing on this report, Perry replaced three of members of the TFSC. Perry's newly appointed Chairman promptly canceled the hearing. Perry denied that the dismissals were related to the case, noting that the terms of the replaced persons were expiring.

In July 2011, Texas Attorney General Greg Abbott ruled that the commission did not have jurisdiction to investigate evidence in cases that occurred before the panel was created in 2005, thus implying that a Commission conclusion regarding the forensic science used in the Willingham case would not be forthcoming.

=== Execution of Mexican nationals ===
Two Mexican nationals have been executed under the Perry administration – José Medellín in 2008 for the 1993 murder of Jennifer Ertman and Elizabeth Peña, and Humberto Leal Garcia in 2011 for the 1994 rape, torture, and murder of Adria Sauceda. At the time of their arrests in the early 1990s, neither had been informed that as Mexican nationals they have the right to inform the Mexican Consulate of the charges and ask for legal assistance. A 2004 ruling by the International Court of Justice concluded that the U.S. had violated the rights of 51 Mexican nationals, including Medellin and Garcia, under the terms of a treaty the U.S. had signed. In response to the ruling, the Bush administration issued an instruction that states comply, but the U.S. Supreme Court ruled that he had exceeded his authority. The Supreme Court also ruled in Medellin v. Texas that the treaty was not binding on states until Congress enacted statutes to implement it, and in Leal Garcia v. Texas declined to place a stay on the executions to allow Congress additional time to enact such a statute. A 2008 ruling by the International Court of Justice asked the United States to place a stay on the executions, but Texas officials stated that they were not bound by international law.

Garcia supporters complained about the use of controversial techniques such as bite mark analysis and luminol in determining his guilt. Garcia however, confessed responsibility for his crimes, and apologized before his execution.

Regarding the Garcia execution, Perry stated that "If you commit the most heinous of crimes in Texas, you can expect to face the ultimate penalty under our laws."

=== Pardons and commutations ===
In 2005, Frances Newton's appeal for a commutation of her death penalty was declined. Her attorney had argued Newton was incapable of standing trial. The Board of Pardon and Parole did not recommend a commutation, and Perry did not grant the one-time reprieve. Newton was executed on September 14, 2005.

In 1990, Tyrone Brown was sentenced to life in a Texas maximum security prison for smoking marijuana while on probation. Texas Judge Keith Dean had originally placed Brown on probation, but changed the sentence after Brown tested positive for marijuana. After being defeated in the last Dallas election, Dean requested the governor pardon Brown. On March 9, 2007, Perry granted Brown a conditional pardon after receiving a recommendation from the Texas Board of Pardons and Paroles.

On August 30, 2007, Perry commuted the death sentence of Kenneth Foster, an accomplice in a 1996 murder, doing so three hours before Foster was to die by lethal injection. Evidence had shown that while Foster was present at the scene of the crime (transporting the individual who actually committed the crime away from the scene in his car), he had nothing to do with the actual commission of the murder, and may not have even been aware that it had been taking place, as he was outside in his car at the time. The Board of Pardon and Parole recommended commutation, and Perry accepted the recommendation, converting the sentence to life in prison with a possibility of parole in 2037.

== Education ==
As lieutenant governor, Perry initially sponsored a controversial school voucher bill as an alternative to the "Robin Hood" school finance proposal. In 2004, Perry attacked the same "Robin Hood" plan as detrimental to the educational system and attempted to get the legislature to replace it with one that he said would encourage greater equity, cost less, hold down property and sales taxes, and foster job growth. Perry supported the legalization of video lottery terminals at racetracks and on Indian reservations as well as increases in cigarette taxes.

A special session of the legislature was convened on June 21, 2005, to address education issues, but resistance developed from House Speaker Tom Craddick, a Republican from Midland. Perry's proposal was attacked by members from property-poor districts and was rejected. During the session, Perry became involved in a heated debate with Comptroller Carole Strayhorn about the merits of his school finance proposal. Strayhorn initially planned to oppose Perry in the 2006 Republican primary, but she instead ran as an independent in the general election. Another special session was convened on July 21, 2005, after Perry vetoed all funding for public schools for the 2007–2008 biennium. He vowed not to "approve an education budget that shortchanges teacher salary increases, textbooks, education technology, and education reforms. And I cannot let $2 billion sit in some bank account when it can go directly to the classroom."

Perry's campaign office in 2006 declared that without the special session, some "$2 billion that had been intended for teacher pay raises, education reforms, and other school priorities would have gone unused because House Bill 2 [the public school reform package] didn't pass." The bill failed to pass in the first session, and was refiled in a second session, in which the bill was defeated 62–79, after 50 amendments were added without discussion or debate.

Late in 2005, to maximize the impact of a bipartisan education plan, Perry asked his former rival in the race for lieutenant governor, John Sharp—a former Texas State Comptroller and a member of the Texas Railroad Commission, Texas State Senate and Texas House of Representatives—to head an education task force charged with preparing a bipartisan education plan. Sharp accepted Perry's offer and removed himself as a potential candidate for governor in 2006. The task force issued its final plan several months later, and the legislature adopted it. For his successful efforts, Sharp was later nominated by The Dallas Morning News for the "Texan of the Year" award.

In 2007, Perry vetoed government provided health insurance for community college faculty due to revelations that schools had been using state funds to pay benefits for non-state employees. Funding for state-employed school personnel was restored in a joint agreement and funding re-allocation later that same year.

In June 2011, Perry signed into law Senate Bill 1736, which establishes the "College Credit for Heroes" program. The new law is intended to help veterans get college credit for military training.

As of 2011, Texas still ranks at the bottom of many educational indicators. Texas has the fewest percentage of adults with high school diplomas, compared to the other U.S. states. Texas is also ranked low in high school graduation rate, though the exact ranking depends on how the statistic is defined. Texas is 49th in verbal SAT scores in the nation and 46th in average math SAT scores. Texas Democrats, U.S. Secretary of Education Arne Duncan, and other detractors of Perry have criticized him regarding Texas schools' performance and class size. Pay increases for Texas's teachers have not kept up with the national average.

== Inauguration concert controversy ==
Perry invited his friend, rock musician Ted Nugent, to perform at a black-tie gala hours after Perry's second inauguration ceremony on January 16, 2007. Nugent appeared onstage during the inaugural ball wearing a cutoff T-shirt emblazoned with the Confederate flag and shouting derogatory remarks about non-English speakers, according to press reports. The NAACP condemned Nugent's wearing the Confederate flag. Perry's spokesman, Robert Black, downplayed the Tuesday-night incident. "Ted Nugent is a good friend of the governor's. He (Perry) asked him (Nugent) if he would play at the inaugural. He didn't put any stipulation of what he would play."

== Congressional redistricting ==
In 2003, Perry called three consecutive special legislative sessions to procure a congressional redistricting plan he said would be more reflective of the state's population. The plan finally adopted—supported by then U.S. House Majority Leader Tom DeLay of Sugar Land—brought about a five-seat Republican gain in the delegation. In 2006, however, the five-seat edge was reduced to three seats. Thereafter, Republicans gained one seat in 2008 and an additional three seats in the 2010 election; they now hold a 23–9 majority.

== Texas and states' rights ==
In April 2009, Perry endorsed a resolution in support of states' rights under Tenth Amendment to the United States Constitution, reaffirming that power that is not delegated to the federal government by the U.S. Constitution, nor prohibited by it to the States, are reserved to the States. In his speech, Perry stated "A number of recent federal proposals are not within the scope of the federal government's constitutionally designated powers and impede the states' right to govern themselves. HCR 50 affirms that Texas claims sovereignty under the 10th Amendment over all powers not otherwise granted to the federal government. ". On April 9, 2009, Perry said, "I believe that our federal government has become oppressive in its size, its intrusion into the lives of our citizens, and its interference with the affairs of our State. That is why I am here today to express my unwavering support for efforts all across our country to reaffirm the States' rights affirmed by the Tenth Amendment to the U.S. Constitution. I believe that returning to the letter and spirit of the U.S. Constitution and its essential 10th Amendment will free our State from undue regulations, and ultimately strengthen our Union." Similar legislation has been passed by other states.

After a Tea Party rally held on April 15, 2009, Perry told a group of reporters:

Texas is a unique place. When we came into the union in 1845, one of the issues was that we would be able to leave if we decided to do that ... My hope is that America and Washington in particular pays attention. We've got a great union. There's absolutely no reason to dissolve it. But if Washington continues to thumb their nose at the American people, who knows what may come of that.

Perry's statement was widely interpreted as raising the possibility of the secession of Texas from the union, and was criticized on that basis. A spokesperson for Perry said that Perry "never advocated seceding". Perry's statement that Texas, in joining the union, had reserved the right to leave was also widely disputed.

== Immigration ==
In 2001, Perry expressed his pride in the enactment of the statute extending in-state tuition to children of undocumented workers. He said:

We must say to every Texas child learning in a Texas classroom, "we don't care where you come from, but where you are going, and we are going to do everything we can to help you get there." And that vision must include the children of undocumented workers. That's why Texas took the national lead in allowing such deserving young minds to attend a Texas college at a resident rate.

Perry has opposed the creation of the Mexico – United States barrier, which is meant to keep out illegal aliens. Instead of barricading the border completely with a fence, Perry believes that the federal government should fulfill its responsibility to its citizens by securing the borders with "boots on the ground" and technology to improve safety while not harming trade with the state's biggest trading partner, Mexico. Perry said the Arizona immigration law SB 1070 "would not be the right direction for Texas" and would distract law enforcement from fighting other crimes.

During a large surge in illegal immigration through the U.S. southern border in the summer of 2014, Perry criticized U.S. President Barack Obama, saying that the surge was "a humanitarian crisis that he has the ability to stop." On July 21, 2014, Perry announced he would send in 1,000 National Guard troops to secure the border. Although illegal immigration levels declined over 70% after Perry deployed the National Guard, PolitiFact.com rated his claim that the decline resulted from the surge as "mostly false."

== Human Trafficking ==
The State Department estimates that one in five victims of human trafficking in the US pass through Texas. Perry has consistently spoken out against human trafficking in Texas, saying:

Human traffickers exploit their victims' hopes and dreams, promising better days and better lives but delivering them instead into a world that's nothing more than modern-day slavery. Hopefully, when human traffickers understand their own freedom and profits are on the line, perhaps for the rest of their lives, they will think twice about continuing to engage in these criminal activities.

Perry has signed several bills that both target traffickers and provide services to victims. In 2009 Perry created the Human Trafficking Prevention Task Force, a group that collects information on trafficking and makes recommendations to combat it. Anti-trafficking legislation signed by Perry includes creation of rescue hotlines for victims and increased prison sentences for traffickers.

== Response to 2011 drought and wildfires ==
On April 21, 2011, Perry proclaimed a three-day period, from April 22 to 24, as "Days of Prayer for Rain in the State of Texas" in response to the wildfires then covering much of the state.

By late July, 75% of the state was experiencing exceptional drought conditions, as opposed to 10–20% in April.

== Indictment ==
On August 15, 2014, Perry was indicted for abuse of power as he threatened to veto funding for state public corruption prosecutors; this might constitute an obstacle to his presidential aspirations.

== Environment ==
Perry opposed the regulation of greenhouse gases as pollutants; a spokesman for Perry cited "unsettled science" regarding climate change. Under Perry Texas sued the Obama administration to overturn Environmental Protection Agency regulations.
