= Trans-Texas =

Trans-Texas may refer to:

- Trans-Texas Corridor (TTC), a transportation network in the planning and early construction stages in the U.S. state of Texas
- Trans-Texas Airways, a former a United States airline, known as Texas International from 1969
