= Lehmberg =

Lehmberg is a surname. Notable people with the surname include:

- Rosemary Lehmberg (born c. 1949), American attorney
- Stanford Lehmberg (1931–2012), American historian and professor
- Emilio Lehmberg (1905–1959), Spanish composer
