= North American SuperCorridor Coalition =

"NASCO project logo depicting the three associated countries' flag iconography as a singular element."

The North America SuperCorridor Coalition (NASCO) is a non-profit organization that seeks to develop an international multi-modal transportation system along the International Mid-Continent Trade Corridor, which it claims will improve trade competitiveness and quality of life in North America.

== Scope ==
NASCO's scope encompasses Interstate highways I-35, I-29, and I-94 and the significant connectors to those highways in the United States, Canada, and Mexico. Certain commentators and politicians have referred to I-35 as the "NAFTA superhighway". Some of the beliefs associated with this appellation have been characterized by opponents as a conspiracy theory to undermine U.S. sovereignty.

== Border crossings ==
The project includes the largest border crossing in North America – the Ambassador Bridge in Detroit, Michigan and Windsor, Ontario – and one of the largest inland ports, Laredo, Texas and Nuevo Laredo, Tamaulipas, the ports of Manzanillo, Colima and Lázaro Cárdenas, Michoacán. It runs as far north as Edmonton, Alberta and Winnipeg, Manitoba.

== Affiliations ==
NASCO now includes the former North American International Trade Corridor Partnership, a nonprofit organization in Mexico. Membership includes public and private sector entities along the corridor in all three participating countries. In the past, the Texas Department of Transportation, which once proposed building the Trans-Texas Corridor, was a NASCO member, but has not been for the last few years.

== Funding ==
NASCO has received $2.5 million in earmarks from the United States Department of Transportation for the development of a technology and tracking tools. NASCO states that the deployment of a modern information system will reduce cost, improve efficiency, reduce trade-related congestion, and enhance security of cross-border and intra-corridor trade and traffic.

== See also ==
- North American Free Trade Agreement
- Security and Prosperity Partnership of North America
