= Interstate 605 (Washington) =

Never-built Interstate highway in Washington

Interstate 605
- Proposed 1998 corridor of I-605 highlighted in red

Route information
- Auxiliary route of I-5
- Status: Never built
- NHS: Entire route

Location
- Country: United States
- State: Washington

Highway system
- Interstate Highway System; Main; Auxiliary; Suffixed; Business; Future; State highways in Washington; Interstate; US; State; Scenic; Pre-1964; 1964 renumbering; Former
| ← SR 603 | → SR 702 |

Interstate 605 (I-605) is the popular moniker given to several proposals for a new auxiliary Interstate Highway bypassing I-5 and I-405 in the U.S. state of Washington. Proposals have been heard from since the 1960s, including highways connecting from I-5 all the way to the Canada–US border, and some just between I-5 and I-90. The Washington State Department of Transportation (WSDOT) has no projects designated I-605 at this time. However, some I-605 proposals have included State Route 18, which has been partially constructed as a freeway.

== Proposals ==
Some of the first plans for a new Interstate Highway freeway, bypassing I-405, surfaced in 1965 while the highway was still under construction. The first proposal was to create a new highway between I-405 and the west banks of Lake Sammamish. Residents however forced the highway to the east banks of the lake after voicing their concerns. Residents on the east side of the lake voiced similar concerns and the plan was later dropped. While the moniker of "I-605" was applied to the proposal, in official studies it was only referred to as the Auburn–Bothell Highway or by the provisional designation of Primary State Highway 19 (PSH 19).

In 1998, the Washington State Legislature ordered a $500,000 study to investigate the benefits of extending SR 18 north to Everett through the Snoqualmie Valley. The plan was dropped as the study found that on average only five minutes would be saved over current routes. In 2002, Bellevue Square owner Kemper Freeman, Jr. made his support known for a new freeway linking Snohomish County via the Snoqualmie Valley.

Another $500,000 study was ordered in 2003 by the legislature, creating a new commerce corridor to link Lewis County in the south to the Canada–US border in the north. However the study showed that a highway existing north of I-90 was not economically feasible. The study proposed a toll road only for trucks, since the presence of passenger cars would discourage truck drivers from using the new alternate route. The highway was estimated to cost between $13.5 and $19 billion.

== Related projects ==
The state currently has no plans to build I-605. However, the SR 18 corridor is part of most I-605 proposals. WSDOT has widened most of SR 18 between I-5 and Hobart to full freeway standards, while the remainder is a two-lane mountainous highway with truck lanes on uphill segments. WSDOT once proposed to creating a full limited-access freeway for the remainder, but updated preliminary plans would upgrade it to a four-lane divided highway, with right-in/right-out at Tiger Mountain and a diverging diamond interchange at I-90. While SR 18 has been a part of most I-605 proposals, it only bypasses the Greater Seattle area on the southern and eastern sides.

== See also ==
- List of future auxiliary Interstate Highways
- List of Interstate Highways in Washington
