= Rosemary Lehmberg =

American lawyer

District Attorney for Travis County, Texas
- In office 2009 – January 3, 2017
- Preceded by: Ronnie Earle
- Succeeded by: Margaret Moore

Personal details
- Born: c. 1949 (age 76–77) Taylor, Texas, U.S.
- Party: Democratic
- Education: University of Texas at Austin; Saint Mary's University School of Law
- Occupation: Attorney

Rosemary Lehmberg (born c. 1949) is a former District Attorney of Travis County, which includes the capital city of Austin, Texas. She began working in the District Attorney's office in 1976. She headed many Divisions of the DA's office, establishing the Travis County Children's Advocacy Center, and was called "The Best Lawyer for Children's Issues" by The Austin Chronicle. In 2009, she became the first female District Attorney in Travis County. Lehmberg served eight years as Travis County's district attorney before retiring in January 2017.

In 2013, she was arrested for and pleaded guilty to drunk driving. She was sentenced to forty-five days in jail. According to Lehmberg's lawyer, David Sheppard, Lehmberg's sentence was "without doubt the harshest sentence anyone has ever received for first time DWI" in Travis County. Video of her detainment and extremely inebriated and aggressive behavior was released to the public. Governor Rick Perry demanded Lehmberg's resignation, and stated that if she did not step down, he would use his line-item veto power to cut all funding to the Public Accountability Office, which is under Lehmberg's authority. Lehmberg refused, and Governor Perry vetoed the office's funding. Perry was indicted for this action but was later cleared of all charges.

== Biography ==
=== Career ===
Born in Taylor, Texas, Lehmberg graduated from the University of Texas at Austin in Natural Sciences and received her J.D. degree from Saint Mary's University School of Law in San Antonio. She ran a private practice until 1976 when she began working for the DA's office in Travis County. She worked in the 167th District Court as a trial attorney, was promoted multiple times and headed specialized legal divisions. She became the Director of the Family Justice Division in 1988, and started the Travis County Children's Advocacy Center (since the Center for Child Protection). She was named the Best Lawyer for Children's Issues by The Austin Chronicle. She was the First Assistant District Attorney from 1997 to 2009, and became the first female District Attorney in Travis County in 2009.

In 2010, Lehmberg stated that the Hate Crimes Task Force she had started would be expanded due to the beating of two gay men in Austin, a case which remained unsolved. In 2011, Lehmberg denied that the sentencing of former House Representative Tom DeLay to three years in prison was a form of political payback by her office. DeLay's conviction was reversed on appeal; the Texas Court of Criminal Appeals found that prosecutors had insufficient evidence to prove their case.

=== Arrest ===
In April 2013, motorists saw Lehmberg driving in a bike lane for over a mile on southbound FM 620, and at one point veering into oncoming traffic on Comanche Trail. When pulled over at an Austin church parking lot, police discovered vodka on her passenger side seat. Her blood alcohol level was .239, three times the legal limit. Lehmberg was taken into custody and while incarcerated officials claimed she was "uncooperative" and "aggressive" and had to be restrained with leg irons, handcuffs, and a spit mask. However, officers have stated they did not observe any spitting, and one jailer stated it was used to protect her identity. Video of her detention were released to the public by an Austin radio station.

DA Lehmberg was charged with a DWI, to which she pleaded guilty and was sentenced to 45 days in jail and a $4,000 fine, ultimately serving 22 days of that sentence. Her driver's license was suspended for 180 days and she waived her right to appeal. Lehmberg wrote a letter from jail to residents of Travis County apologizing for her behavior, vowing to get professional help and to not seek a third term in 2016. A few days after the arrest, Austin attorney Kerry O'Brien filed a civil lawsuit to remove Lehmberg from office under a rarely used state law that allows for removal of certain public officers for "intoxication". In June 2013, Rick Reed, former prosecutor, filed a criminal complaint against Lehmberg for abuse of office, due to her threats and apparent attempts to obtain special treatment on the night of her arrest. The grand jury eventually concluded her actions while in custody did not constitute official misconduct and Lehmberg was no-billed. The civil suit went to trial in December 2013, and the judge declined to remove her from office.

=== Post-incarceration events ===
Then Texas Governor Rick Perry demanded Lehmberg step down from her position or he would veto $7.5 million of state funding for the Public Corruption office which Lehmberg worked for. Meetings were held between Travis County officials and Governor Perry's representatives in order to reach an agreement to keep the funding going. Perry's representatives indicated that if Lehmberg stepped down, funding would be restored and her top lieutenant would be allowed to succeed her. Later the offer was changed, so she would be allowed to work at the DA's office in another capacity. When Lehmberg refused, Perry vetoed the office's funding, stating "The person charged with ultimate responsibility of that unit has lost the public's confidence." Travis County helped to pay for the office's funding, but several staffers were laid off.

As a result of the veto, a group called Texans for Public Justice filed an ethics complaint against Governor Perry, claiming the veto was an illegal attempt to coerce a public official to resign. Lehmberg was not involved in reviewing the ethics complaint and a special prosecutor was appointed to review the claims instead. On August 15, 2014, a grand jury indicted Perry on two counts. Perry vowed to fight the prosecution, and on February 22, 2016, more than a year after he left office, the Texas Court of Criminal Appeals granted Perry's pretrial habeas petition and dismissed all criminal charges against him.

Attorney Kerry O'Brien filed a complaint with the Texas Ethics Commission on August 8, 2014, alleging that during Lehmberg's 2013 legal battles she paid her attorney using improper and unreported campaign contributions.
