= NAFTA superhighway =

Type of highway in the United States

Interstate 29 and Interstate 35, described by the Ministry of Transportation for the province of Alberta as the "NAFTA superhighway"

The NAFTA superhighway is a term sometimes used informally to refer to certain existing and proposed highways intended to link Canada, Mexico, and the United States. Although the term has not been used publicly by governments in an official policy context, there are some dissident beliefs about this appellation that are associated with nationalist conspiracy theories regarding alleged secret plans to undermine U.S. sovereignty. Development of these routes is supported by the North American SuperCorridor Coalition as part of a NASCO Corridor. These include Interstate 35 from Laredo, Texas to the Canadian border that downgrades to a non-freeway route ending at Thunder Bay, Ontario, and Interstate 29, a spur that also downgrades to a regular highway at the border and continues to Winnipeg, Manitoba.

The term is also sometimes used to describe some additional partly-built or proposed highways and supercorridors which are intended to connect the road systems of the three nations of the North American Free Trade Agreement (NAFTA) trade bloc. Interstate 69, which runs from Port Huron, Michigan, near the US-Canada border, to western Kentucky, is one among them. Ontario Highway 402 and other motorways in the Windsor-Quebec City Corridor in Canada might be viewed as an extension of this NAFTA superhighway to the northeast. There is now not a single motorway that has been finished in the southwest, from western Kentucky to the Mexican border. While I-69 is being built, the main routes to Mexico currently consist of portions of US Routes 45 and 51 from Kentucky to western Tennessee, I-155 from Tennessee to Missouri, portions of Interstates 55 and 40 from Missouri to Arkansas, and I-30 from Arkansas to the Texas portion of I-35, the original Nafta Superhighway that runs south to the Mexican border at Laredo, Texas. The uncompleted section of I-69 south of Kentucky is expected to eventually continue southwestward to the Texas Gulf Coast. It will have a spur linking to the original Pan-American Highway route through Mexico to Laredo, and additional branches extending to the Mexican spurs that cross the border at Pharr, Texas, and Brownsville, Texas.

The CANAMEX Corridor is another major route that links the three NAFTA countries. It includes Mexican Federal Highway 15, American I-19 and I-15, and Alberta highway 2. The route is sometimes referenced as part of the NAFTA superhighway concept, but it already has a name of its own. In addition to the major north–south corridors that link the Canadian and Mexican borders, Interstate 94 is an important east–west inland freeway (not coast-to-coast like most of the other major east–west interstates) that directly or indirectly links the corridors. I-94 starts near the CANAMEX Corridor in Montana (Interstate 90 bridges the gap thereby providing an indirect link) then follows a northerly route just south of the Canadian border to intersect fully with the I-29 and I-35 routes of the "NAFTA Superhighway". Further east, it links Chicago and the Windsor-Quebec City Corridor that has its western terminus at the Port Huron border crossing. The Canadian corridor is a de facto continuation of I-94 and I-96 to and from eastern Canada. It is also linked by I-94 to the Chicago-Kansas City Expressway that follows a more southerly route to and from I-35. The importance of the Port Huron border crossing is enhanced by the fact that I-69 connects to the Windsor-Quebec City Corridor at the same bridge as I-94.

== See also ==
- North American Union
- Security and Prosperity Partnership of North America
- Free Trade Area of the Americas
