= List of Interstate Highways in Washington =

Interstate Highways in Washington
- Highway markers for Interstate 5, Interstate 90, and Interstate 182

- Map of highways in Washington with the Interstates highlighted in red

System information
- Length: 764.26 mi (1,229.96 km)
- Formed: June 29, 1956

Highway names
- Interstates: Interstate nn (I‑nn)
- Business Loops: Business Loop Interstate nn (BL I‑nn)
- Business Spurs: Business Spur Interstate nn (BS I‑nn)

System links
- State highways in Washington; Interstate; US; State; Scenic; Pre-1964; 1964 renumbering; Former

The Interstate Highways in Washington are segments of the national Interstate Highway System that lie within the U.S. state of Washington. The system comprises 764 miles (1,230 km) on seven routes that are owned and maintained by the Washington State Department of Transportation (WSDOT); the design standards and numbering across the national system are managed by the Federal Highway Administration (FHWA) and the American Association of State Highway and Transportation Officials (AASHTO).

Washington has three primary Interstates and four auxiliary routes; the seven routes serve most of the state's major cities. The longest of these is Interstate 90 (I-90), which is 298 miles (480 km) long and connects the state's two largest cities, Seattle and Spokane. I-5 is the only Interstate to span the state from south to north, traveling from the Oregon state line to the Canadian border. The system also includes several business routes that are not maintained or managed by WSDOT, but rather by local governments.

The general plan and federal funding for the Interstate Highway System were approved by the U.S. Congress in the Federal-Aid Highway Act of 1956. The federal plan incorporated elements of the Washington state government's plan for limited access highways, including an urban tollway that was later cancelled. The original allocation of two primary routes and two auxiliary routes was later expanded in the 1960s and 1970s with the addition of I-82 and two more auxiliary routes. The last segment of the Interstate Highway System in Washington, a section of I-90 between Seattle and Bellevue, was completed in 1993. An eighth route, popularly named I-605, has been proposed in several forms since the 1960s but was never submitted for formal approval.

== Description ==
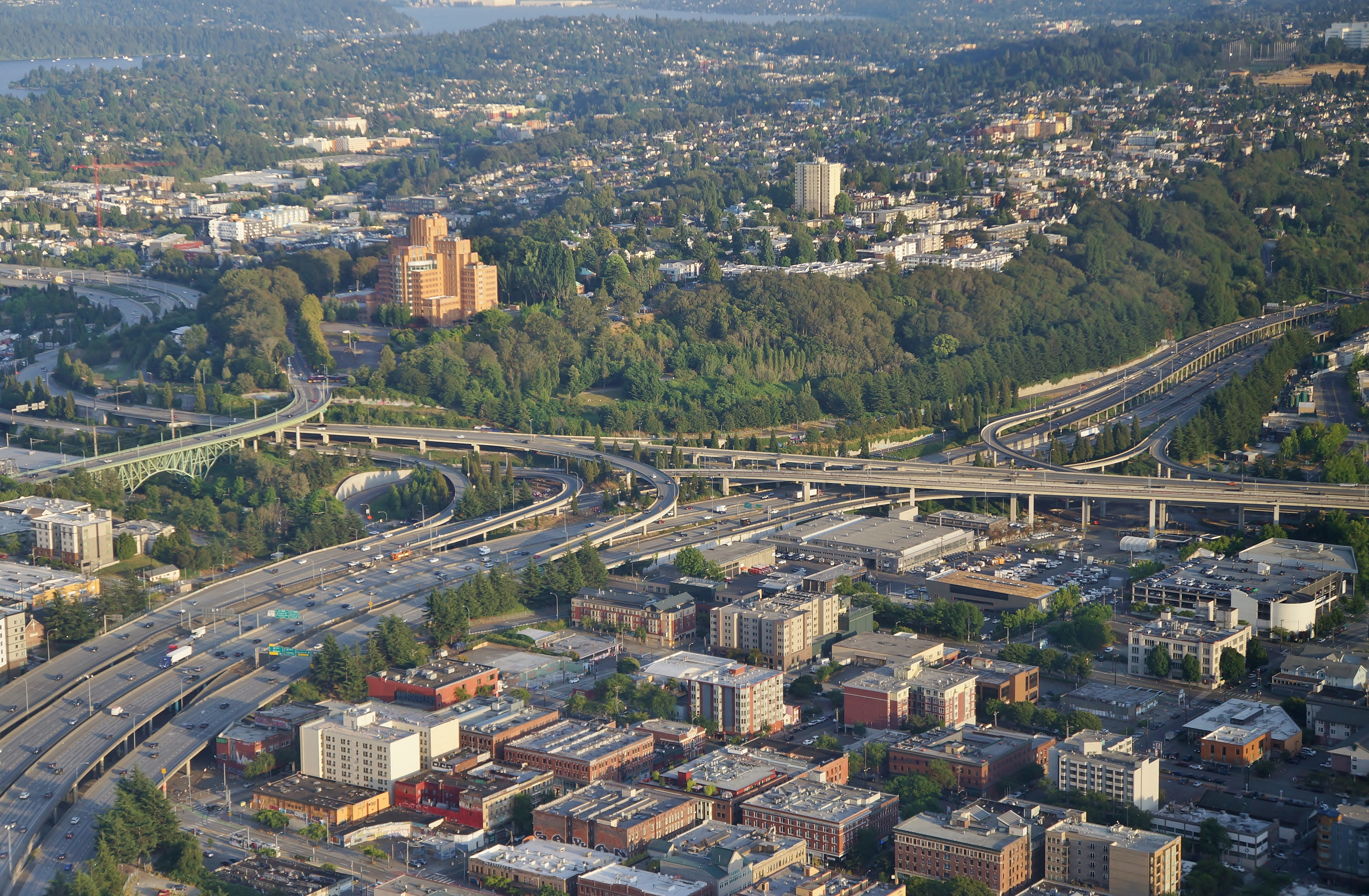
Aerial image of the I-5 and I-90 interchange south of Downtown Seattle

All seven Interstate Highways in Washington are legally defined as part of the state highway system, which is maintained and administered by WSDOT. They are all freeways built to Interstate Highway standards, which require full grade separation and control of access via interchanges, design speeds of 50 to 70 miles per hour (80 to 113 km/h), a minimum of two lanes per direction, and widths of at least 12 feet (3.7 m) for lanes and 4 to 10 feet (1.2 to 3.0 m) for the left and right shoulders, respectively. The FHWA is responsible for overseeing these standards and can also approve exceptions. The numbering scheme used to designate the Interstates was developed by AASHTO, an organization composed of the various state departments of transportation in the United States. A set of business routes, which use a modified green Interstate shield, are designated and maintained by local governments instead of WSDOT and do not require approval from the FHWA.

The Interstate Highway System covers about 764 miles (1,230 km) in Washington and consists of three primary routes and four auxiliary routes. They connect the major cities and metropolitan areas of the state, working in concert with the U.S. routes and state routes also maintained by WSDOT. The longest route, I-90, is 298 miles (480 km) and connects the state's two largest cities, Seattle and Spokane; the shortest is I-705 at 1.5 miles (2.4 km). The widest section in the state is on I-5 in Downtown Seattle, which spans 13 lanes and includes a set of reversible express lanes that change direction depending on time of the day. Various sections of the Interstate Highways serving the Seattle and Portland–Vancouver metropolitan areas also have designated lanes for high-occupancy vehicles, buses, and tolled vehicles. The Seattle–Tacoma area ranks third among U.S. metropolitan areas for the number of sections with high-occupancy vehicle lanes. In 2019, Washington's Interstates carried an estimated 17.4 billion vehicle miles traveled, comprising 28 percent of all travel on roads in the state.

== History ==
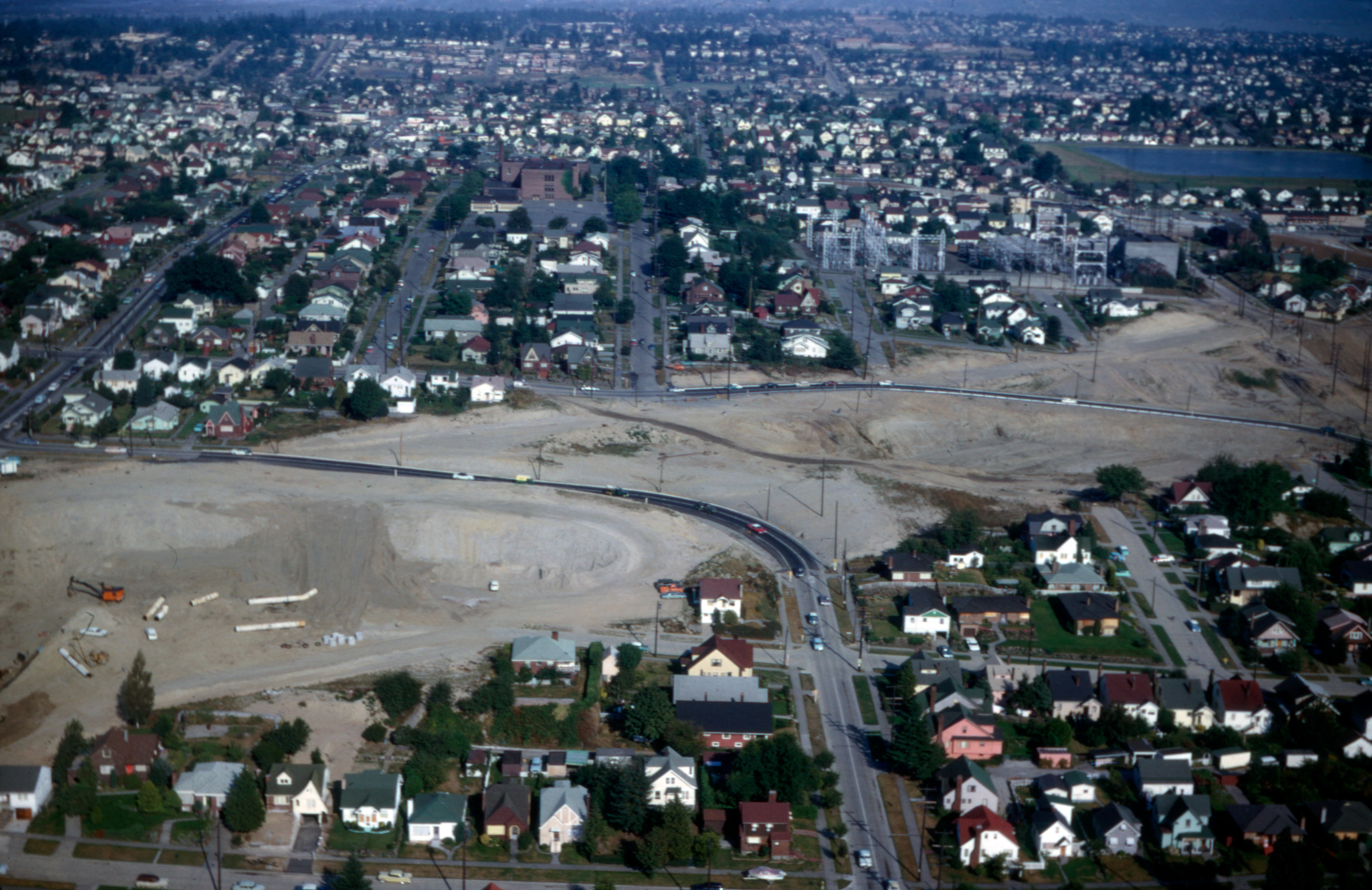
Construction of I-5 in north Seattle, 1963

Early proposals for a national system of "superhighways" with limited access and grade separation emerged in the 1930s at the behest of the Bureau of Public Roads (BPR; now the FHWA) under the Roosevelt administration. A 1939 BPR report evaluated national corridors for tolled superhighways, including a north–south route on the West Coast terminating at the Canadian border in Washington and an east–west route originating in Seattle to connect the Northern states. The first major expressway with limited access to be built in the state was the Alaskan Way Viaduct in Downtown Seattle, which was announced in 1947 and used federal grants authorized by the Federal-Aid Highway Act of 1944. It opened in 1953 and replaced sections of U.S. Route 99 (US 99), part of the older United States Numbered Highway System.

The Washington State Legislature approved their own plans for a system of limited-access highways in 1947, in response to rising collisions and hazardous conditions on existing state roadways. The legislation authorized planning for a tolled superhighway between Seattle and Tacoma that would later be extended south to Oregon and north to British Columbia as a replacement for US 99. A second bill in 1951 authorized the construction of expressways to replace rural sections of US 99 and US 10 (the east–west trunk), particularly by bypassing small cities, and the program was expanded to cover 2,388 miles (3,843 km) by 1953. In addition to the inter-regional superhighways planned in the 1930s and 1940s, the BPR also surveyed potential urban routes and bypasses that would perform auxiliary functions. These included bypasses of Seattle and Portland, Oregon, the latter of which would also encompass Vancouver, Washington.

The Federal-Aid Highway Act of 1956, signed into law by President Dwight D. Eisenhower on June 29, 1956, formally authorized the creation of the Interstate Highway System and its design standards. It also established a federal commitment to fund 90 percent of construction costs for eligible Interstate projects. In August 1957, the American Association of State Highway Officials (AASHO; now AASHTO) designated the state's two primary routes as I-5 and I-90, replacing US 99 and US 10, respectively. A pair of auxiliary routes were also included in the original Washington allocation and numbered in 1958: I-205, bypassing Portland and Vancouver; and I-405, bypassing Seattle. Washington's third primary route, connecting Ellensburg to Pendleton, Oregon, was authorized by the BPR in October 1957 as part of an addition to the Interstate Highway System. It was numbered I-82 by AASHO in 1958, completing the initial allocation of 726 miles (1,168 km) for Washington. A rejected extension of I-82 across the Cascade Range to Tacoma and Aberdeen, totaling 167 miles (269 km), was submitted by Washington in 1959.

Among the first Interstate projects in Washington to be built with funding from the Federal-Aid Highway Act of 1956 were bypasses of Fort Lewis and Olympia that had already been planned by the state government. They were incorporated into I-5, and in early 1958 the Tacoma project became the first section in the state to use the Interstate shield. I-5 was also the first Interstate to be fully completed in Washington, following the opening of a section between Everett and Marysville on May 14, 1969. The first auxiliary route to be fully completed was I-405, which was opened to traffic between Woodinville and Lynnwood in November 1969. The state government made improvements to the expanding Interstate system in the 1960s and 1970s, building rest areas and scenic overlooks on the primary routes and introducing mileage-based exit numbers in 1973.

The southern section of I-82 between Yakima and Oregon was originally routed away from the Tri-Cities region, where local leaders petitioned for access to the Interstate system. Following a dispute between the states of Washington and Oregon, the FHWA proposed to route I-82 towards the Tri-Cities, which would be directly served by a spur route. The new connector, numbered I-182, was approved in 1969 and fully opened in 1986 alongside the last Washington section of I-82; the highways were delayed by disagreements with local governments and spending cuts during the early 1980s recession. The Washington section of I-205 was completed with the opening of the Glenn L. Jackson Memorial Bridge over the Columbia River in December 1982, a few months before the Oregon section was fully open to traffic. The final Interstate to be added in Washington was I-705, a short spur into Downtown Tacoma, which was approved by the FHWA and AASHTO in 1978 and opened in 1988.

The final section of the Interstate system in Washington, I-90 between Seattle and Bellevue, took over 30 years to plan and construct amid disagreements and litigation over its design and other mitigation. The 7-mile (11 km) section included construction of the Homer M. Hadley Memorial Bridge to supplement the existing Lacey V. Murrow Memorial Bridge (both among the longest floating bridges in the world), expansion of the Mount Baker Tunnel, and a set of lids in Seattle and Mercer Island; its total cost was $1.56 billion (equivalent to $3.05 billion in 2024 dollars), among the most expensive parts of the Interstate system. The FHWA estimated the total cost to construct the Interstate Highway System in the state to be $4.558 billion in 1989 (equivalent to $10 billion in 2024 dollars), placing Washington eighth among all states by total cost.

An outer beltway for the Seattle metropolitan area, bypassing I-405 and several Eastside suburbs, has been proposed under the unofficial moniker of "I-605" several times since the 1960s. The state government has never formally applied for its addition to the Interstate Highway System, but it was tentatively designated as State Route 605 (SR 605) by the legislature. Proposals to build a north–south freeway near Lake Sammamish were defeated in 1968, but the idea was revived in 1998 as an extension of SR 18 through the Snoqualmie Valley. A 2004 study commissioned by the state legislature determined that an outer beltway would not be feasible to construct due to its high costs as well as opposition from local residents and environmental groups.

== Primary Interstates ==
List of Primary Interstate Highways in Washington
Number	Length (mi)	Length (km)	Southern or western terminus	Northern or eastern terminus	Formed	Removed	Notes
I-5	276.62	445.18	I-5 at Oregon state line in Vancouver	Highway 99 at Canadian border in Blaine	1957	current	Main north–south corridor in Western Washington; completed in 1969. Officially designated the Purple Heart Trail since 2013.
I-82	132.57	213.35	I-90 / US 97 in Ellensburg	I-82 / US 395 at Oregon state line near Plymouth	1957	current	Serves the Yakima Valley and Tri-Cities regions and was completed in 1986.
I-90	297.51	478.80	SR 519 in Seattle	I-90 at Idaho state line near Liberty Lake	1957	current	Main east–west corridor in Washington and the longest Interstate, completed in 1993. Officially designated the American Veterans Memorial Highway since 1991.
1.000 mi = 1.609 km; 1.000 km = 0.621 mi

Primary Interstates

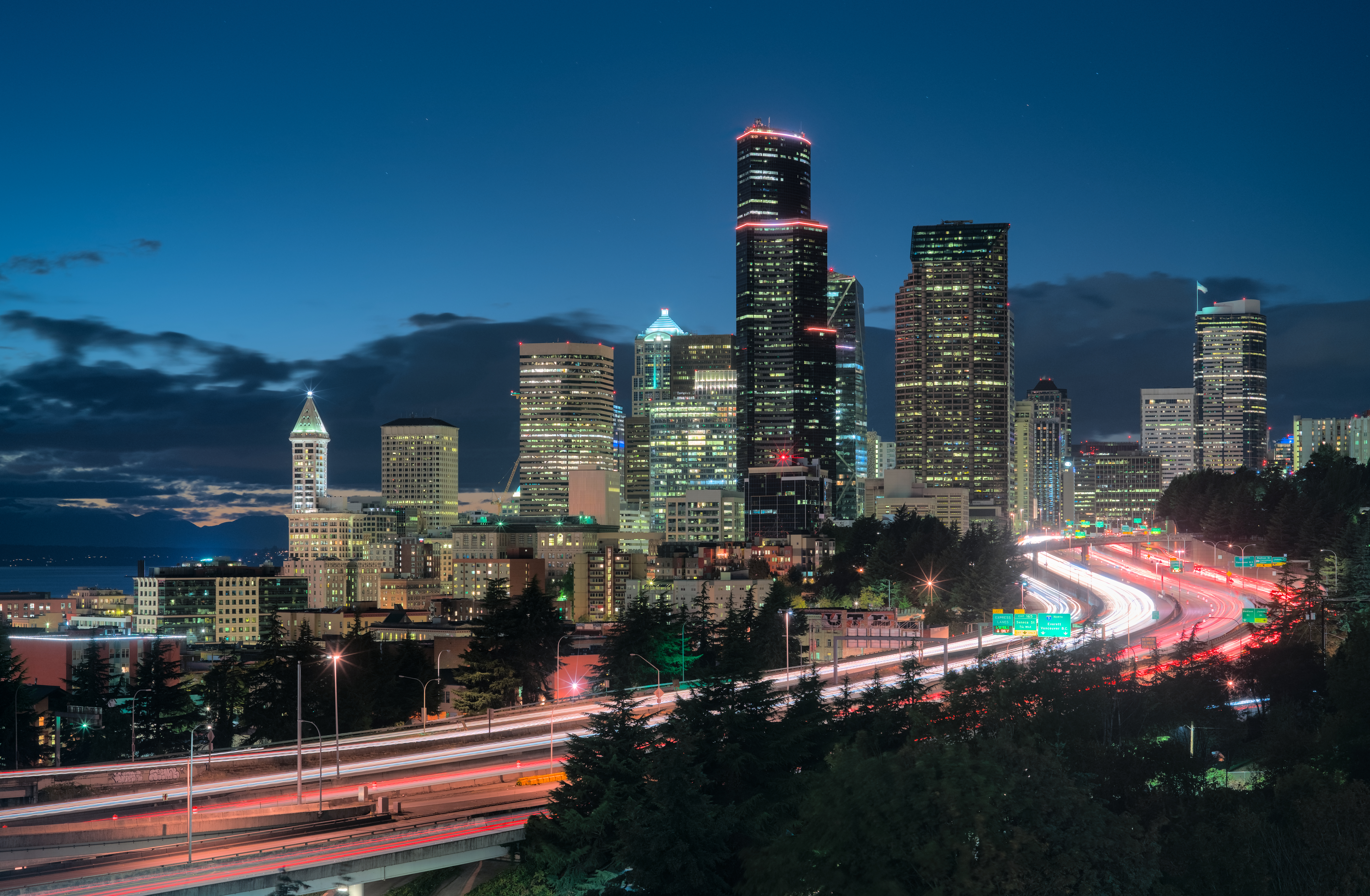
I-5 in Downtown Seattle, 2018

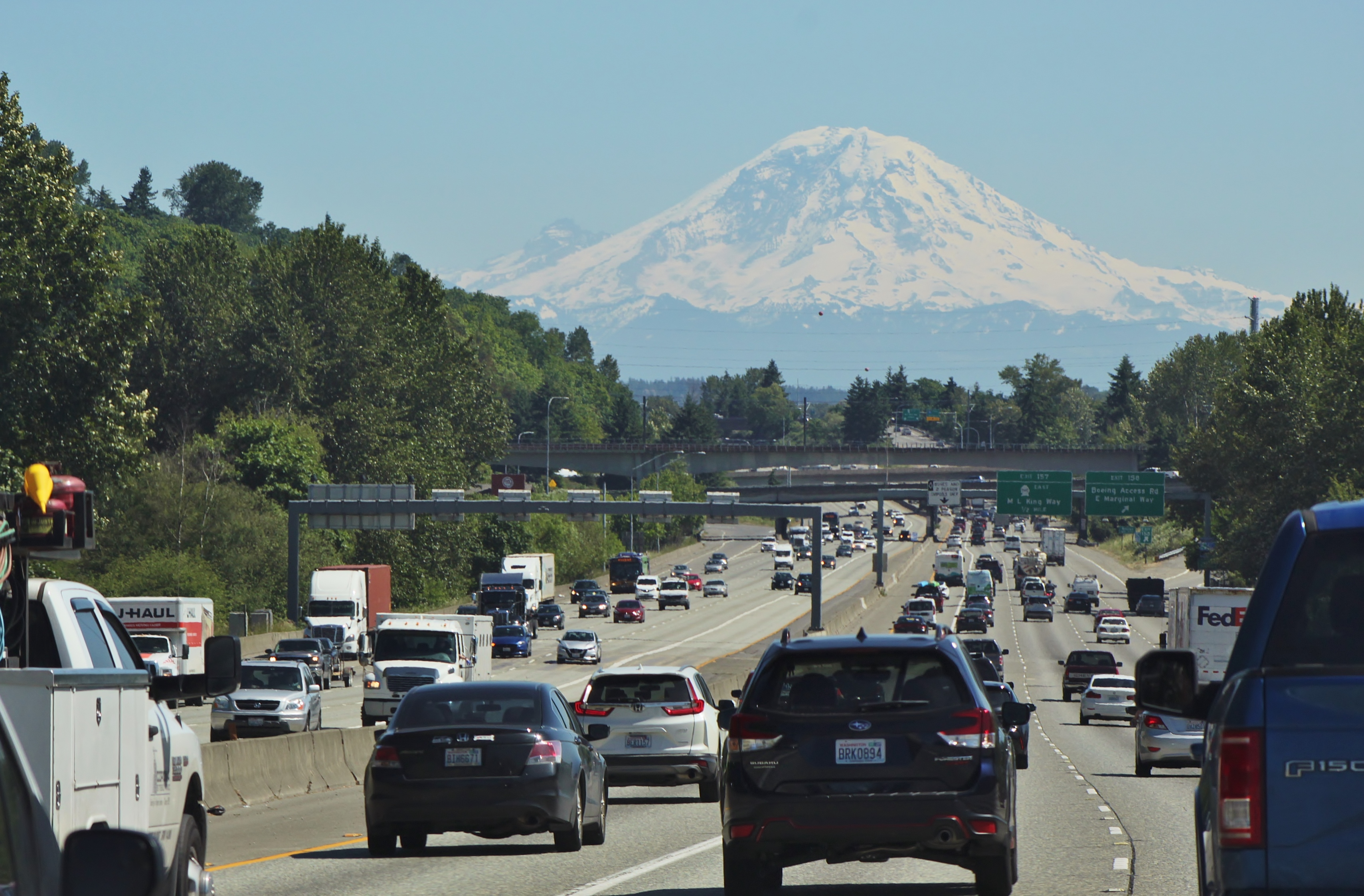
I-5 near Seattle with Mount Rainier in the background

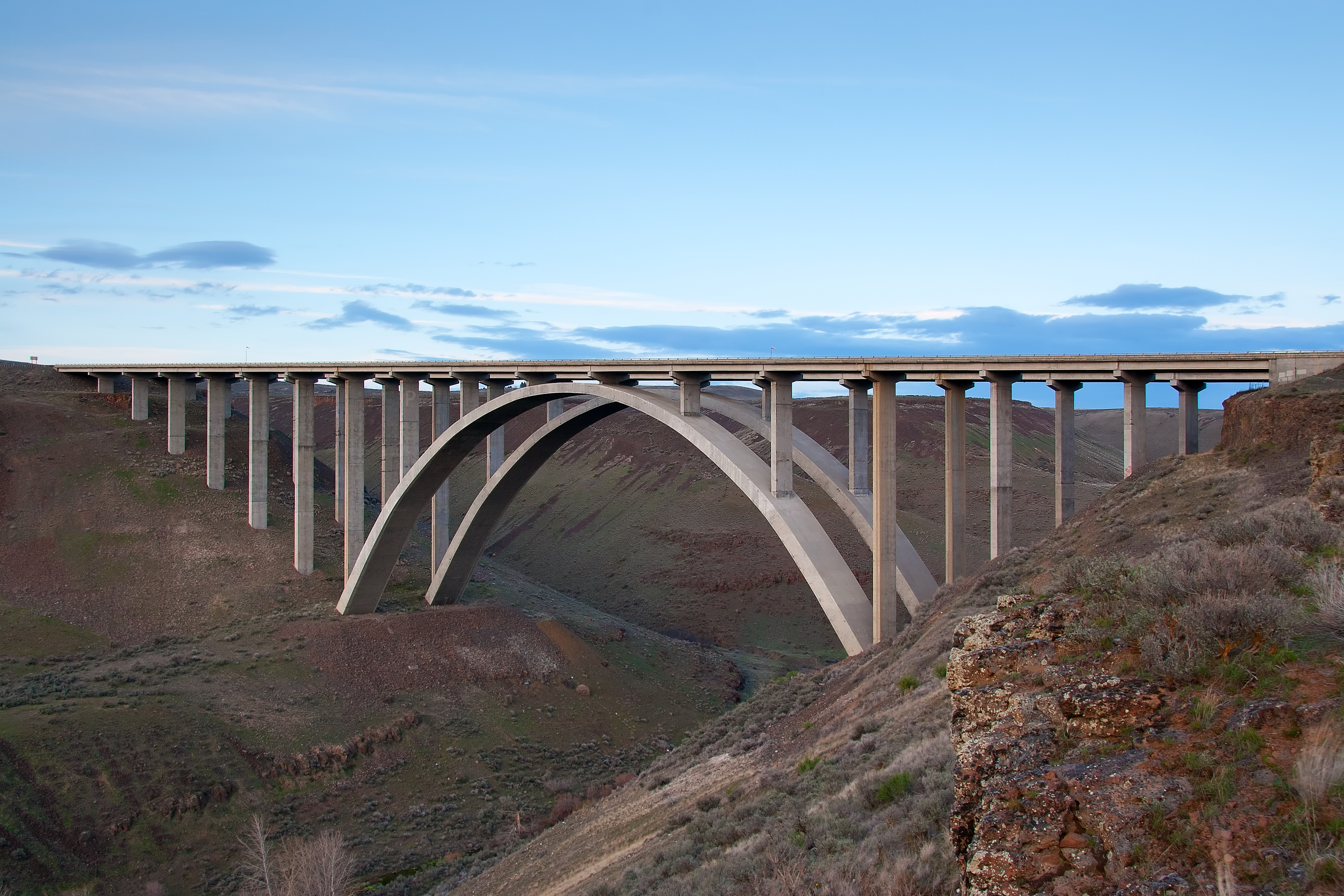
The Fred G. Redmon Bridge on I-82 near Yakima

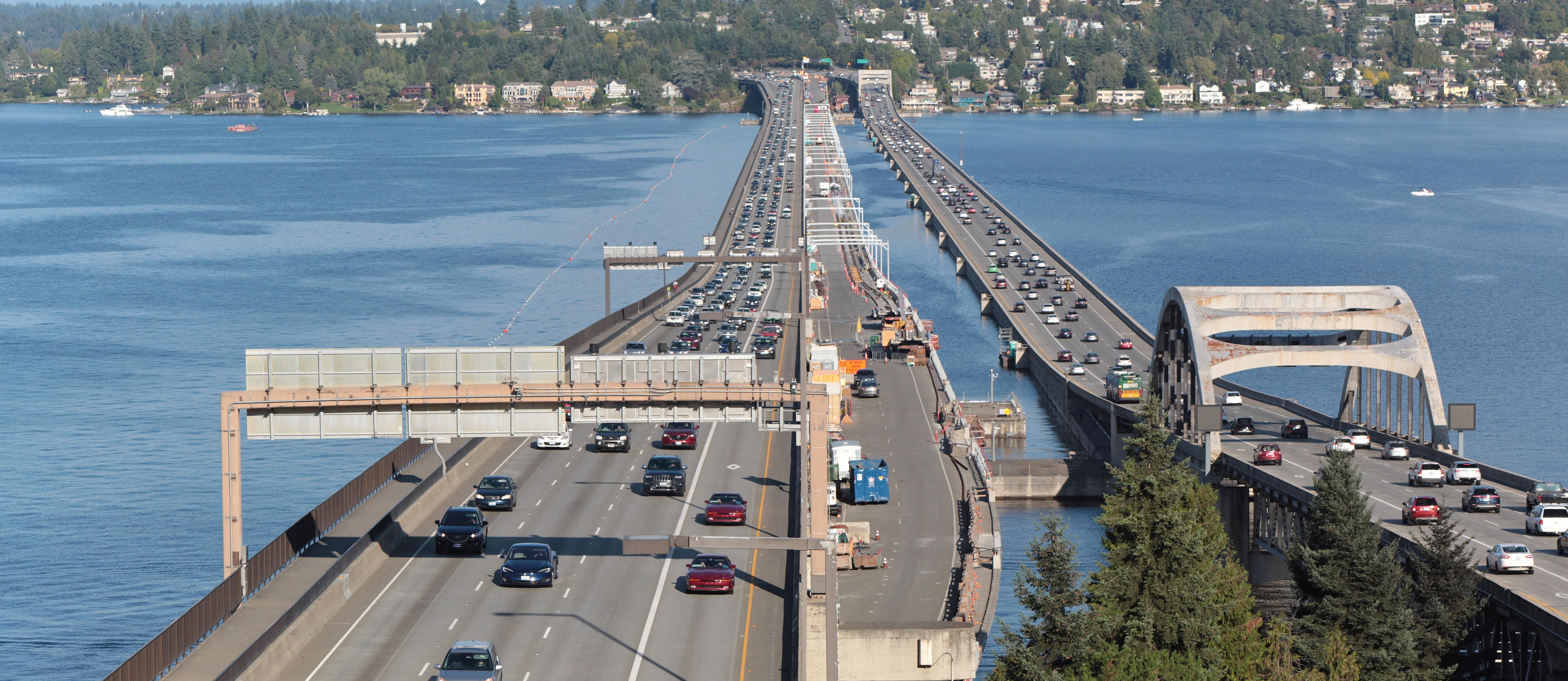
The Interstate 90 floating bridges on Lake Washington

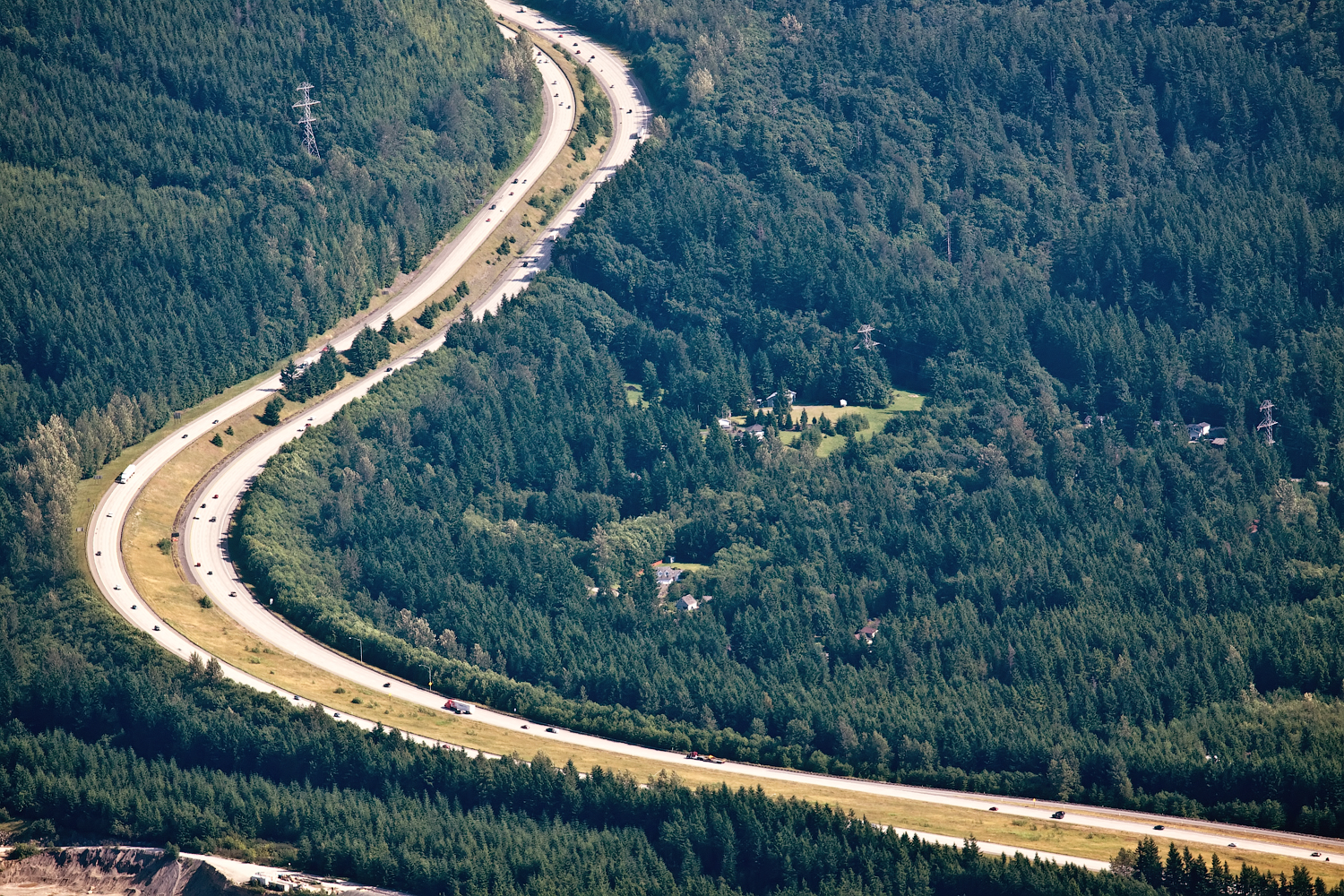
Aerial view of I-90 near North Bend

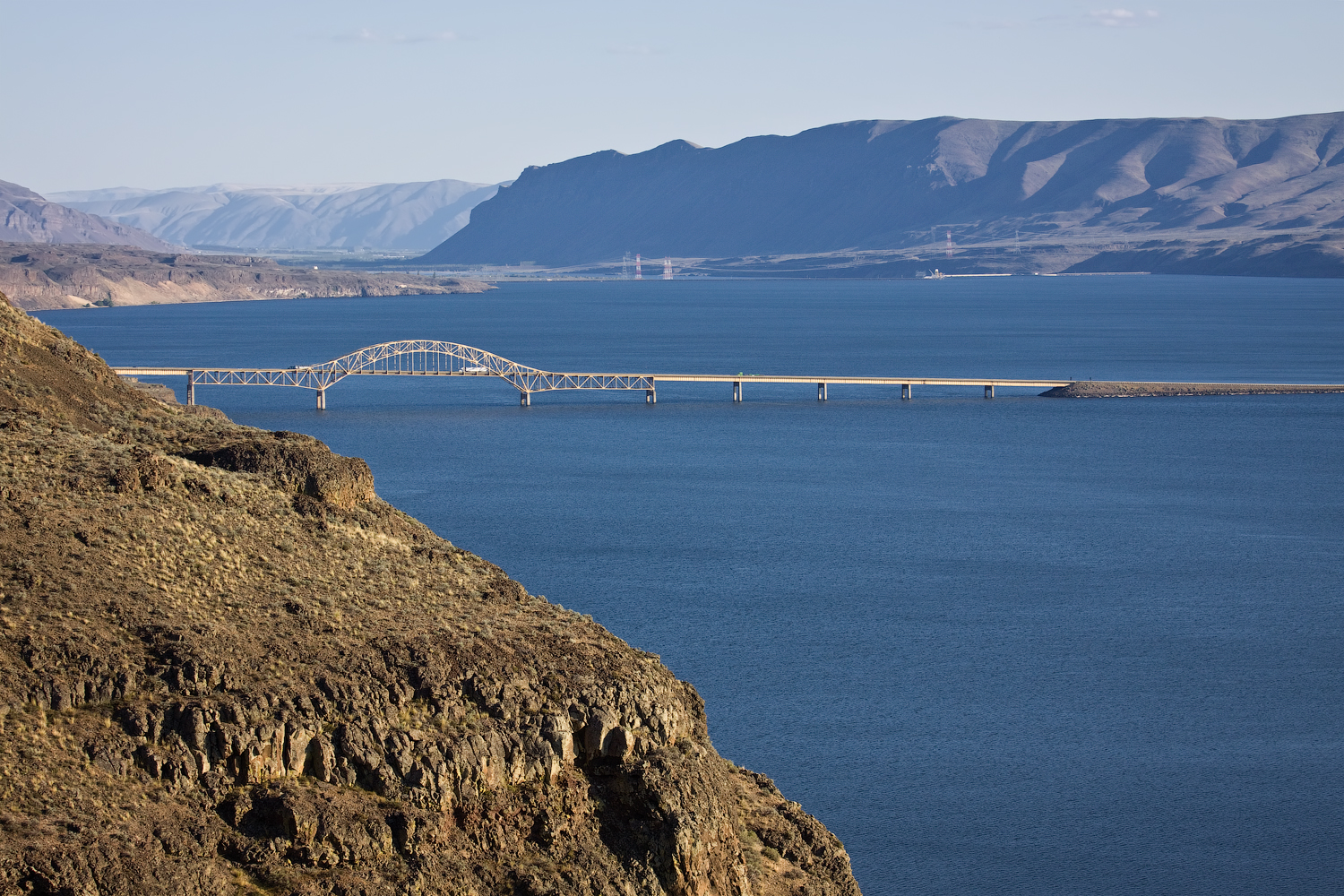
I-90 crossing the Columbia River on the Vantage Bridge

== Auxiliary Interstates ==
List of Auxiliary Interstate Highways in Washington
Number	Length (mi)	Length (km)	Southern or western terminus	Northern or eastern terminus	Formed	Removed	Notes
I-182	15.19	24.45	I-82 / US 12 near Richland	US 12 in Pasco	1969	current	I-182 is a spur that serves the Tri-Cities area and was completed in 1986.
I-205	10.57	17.01	I-205 at Oregon state line near Vancouver	I-5 in Salmon Creek	1958	current	I-205 is a loop that bypasses Portland, Oregon, and Vancouver, Washington; its Washington section was completed in 1982 and the entire highway opened in 1983.
I-405	30.30	48.76	I-5 / SR 518 in Tukwila	I-5 / SR 525 in Lynnwood	1958	current	I-405 is a loop that bypasses Seattle to serve the Eastside and was completed in 1969.
I-705	1.50	2.41	I-5 / SR 7 in Tacoma	Schuster Parkway in Tacoma	1978	current	I-705 is a spur that serves Downtown Tacoma and was completed in 1988.
1.000 mi = 1.609 km; 1.000 km = 0.621 mi

Auxiliary Interstates

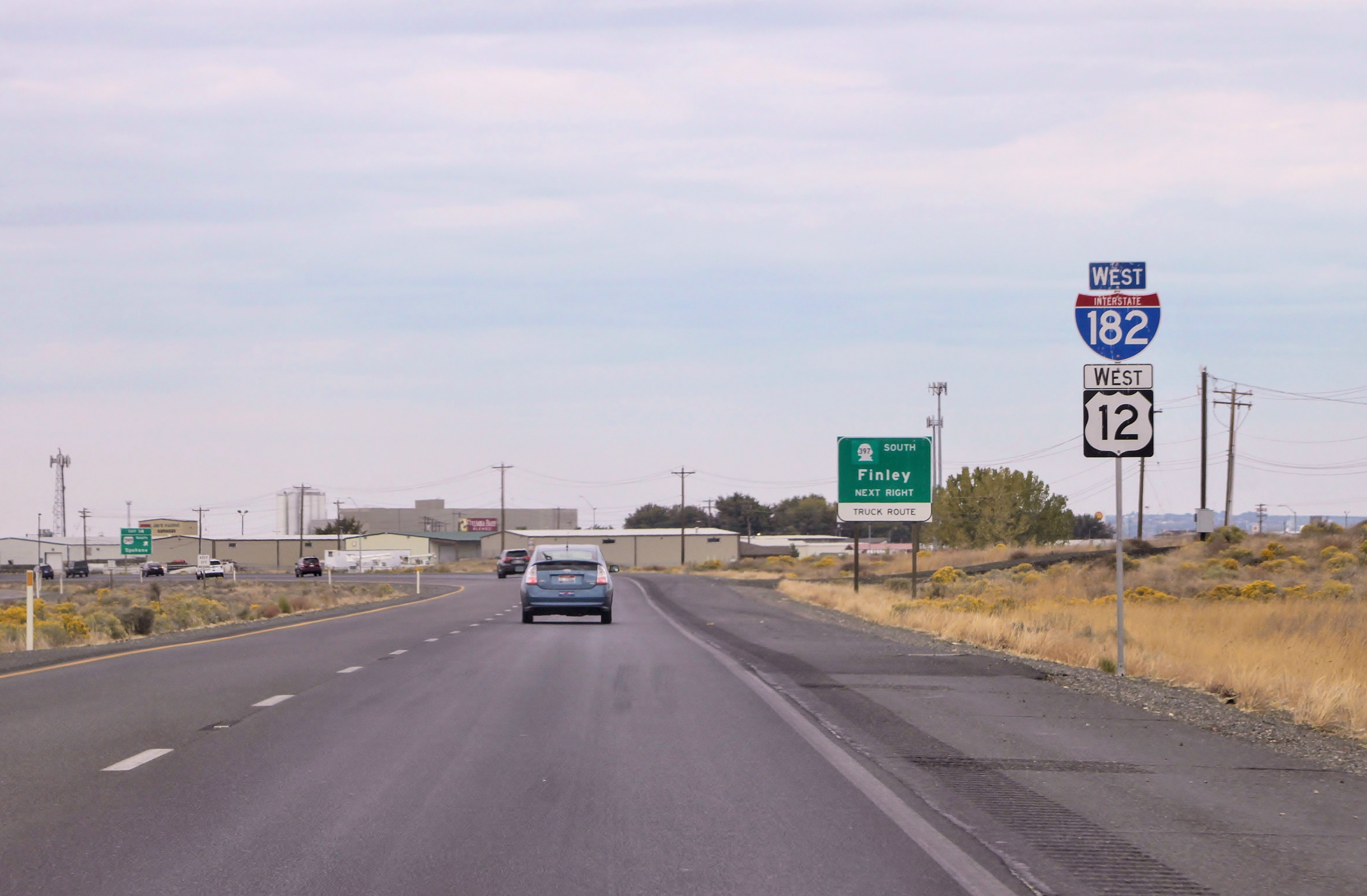
I-182 westbound in Pasco

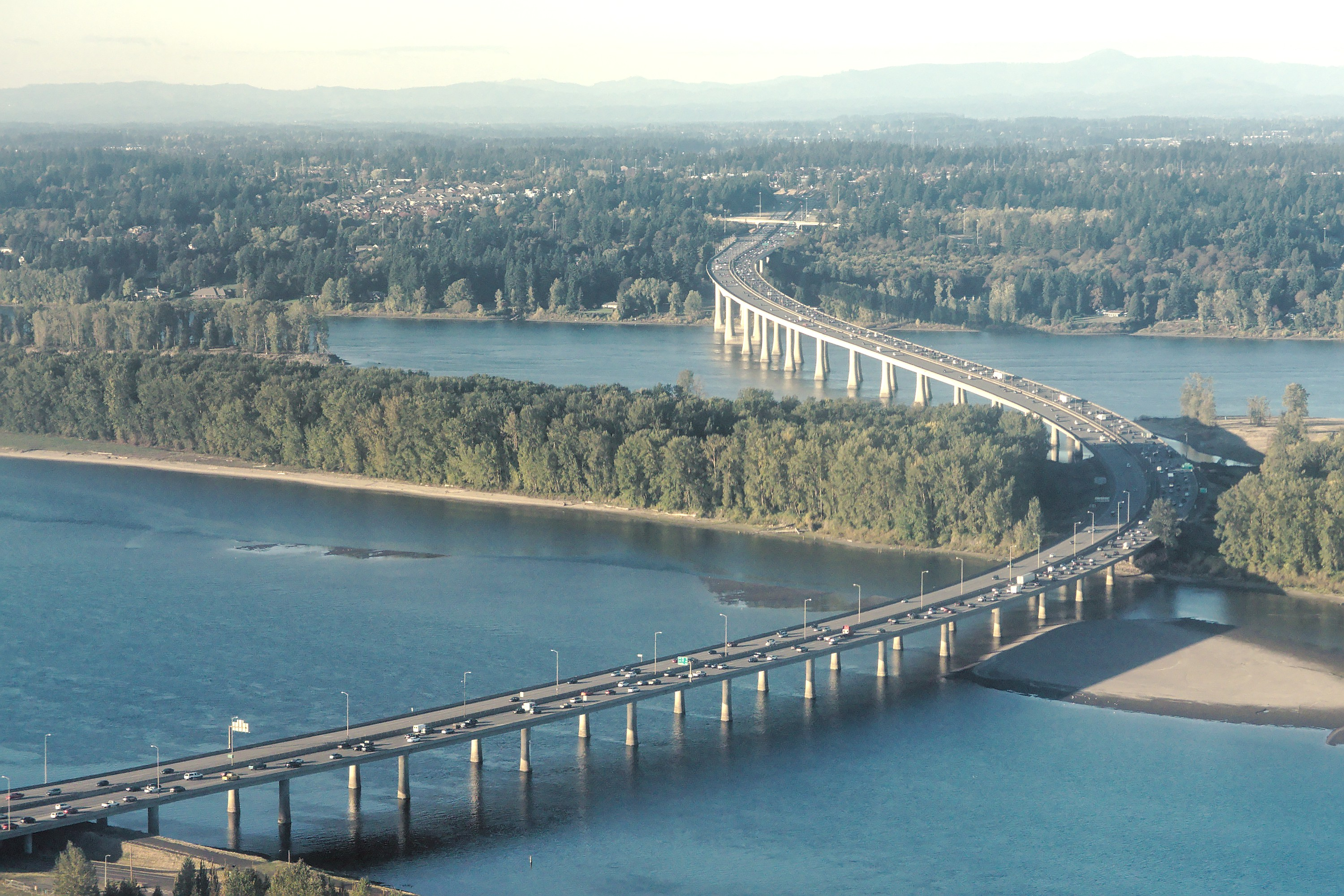
I-205 crossing the Columbia River on the Glenn L. Jackson Memorial Bridge

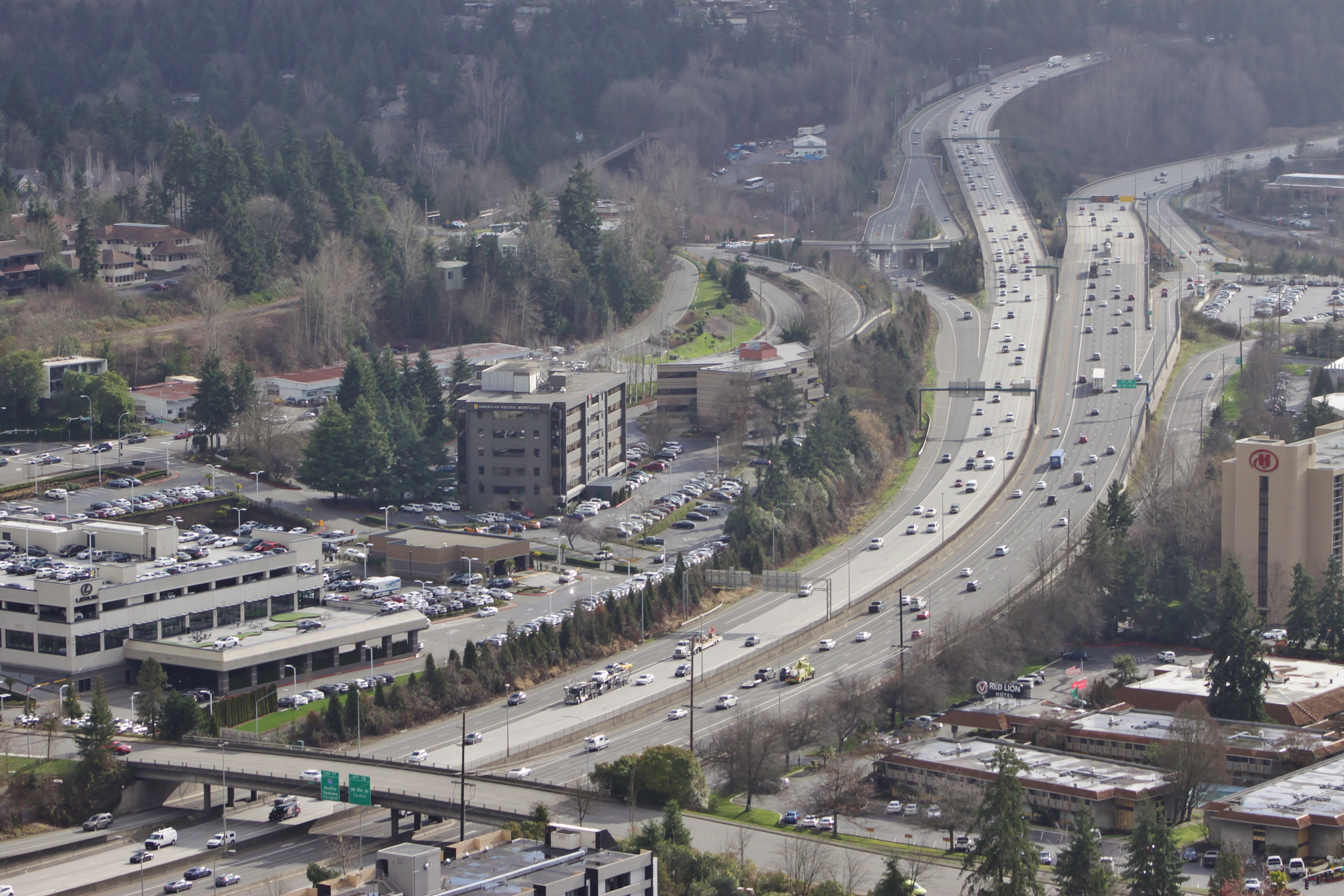
Aerial view of I-405 near Downtown Bellevue

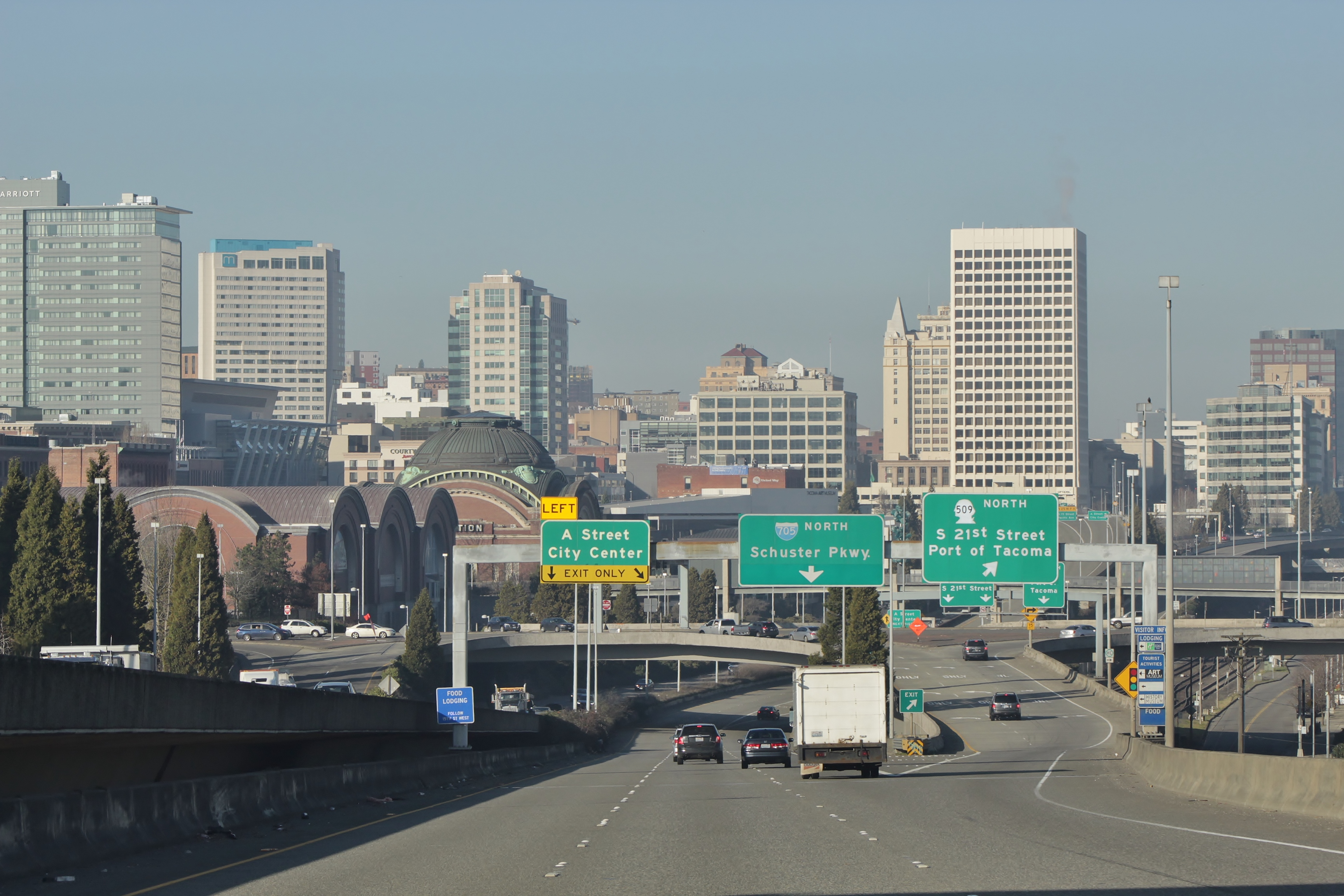
I-705 in Downtown Tacoma
