= Cintra =

Spanish transport infrastructure company

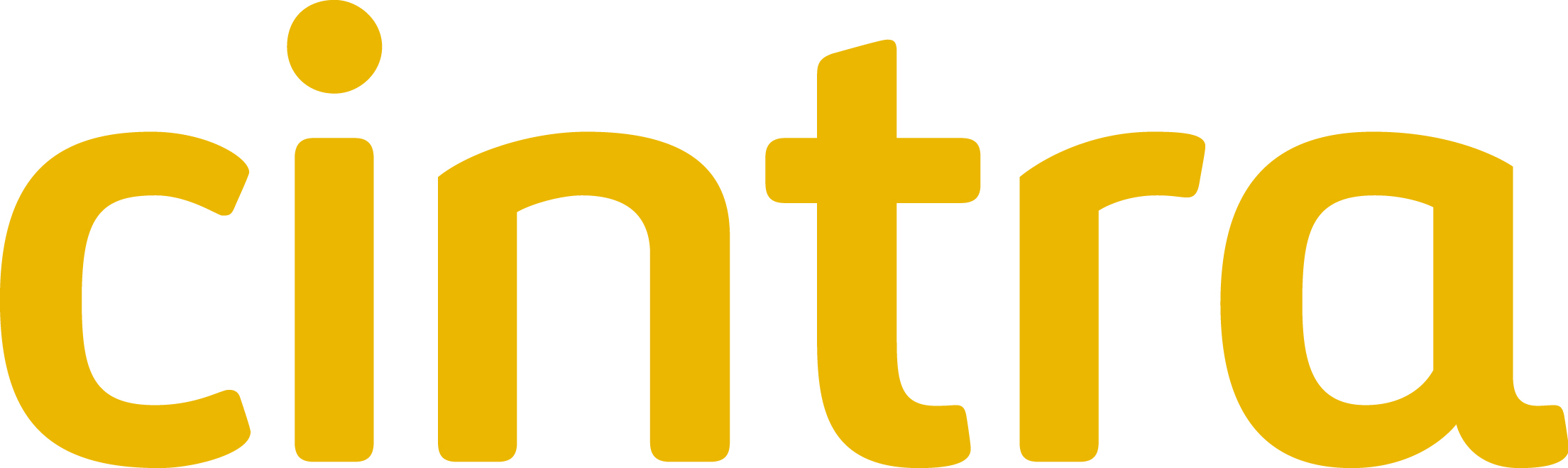
- Type: Subsidiary
- Traded as: BMAD: CIN
- Industry: Transportation
- Founded: 1998; 28 years ago
- Headquarters: Madrid, Spain
- Key people: Enrique Díaz-Rato Revuelta (CEO); Rafael del Pino y Calvo-Sotelo (chairman of the board)
- Products: Toll roads, car parks
- Revenue: €735.9 million (2008)
- Operating income: ▲€400.8 million (2008)
- Net income: ▼ (€56.3 million) (2008)
- Number of employees: 1,950 (2008)
- Parent: Ferrovial
- Website: Spain: www.cintra.es U.S.: www.cintra.us

Cintra, S.A. (Concesiones de Infraestructuras de Transporte, translated as Toll Transport Infrastructures) is one of the largest private developers of transport infrastructure in the world. Its assets are fundamentally toll roads and car parks, in which it has a total investment of €16billion. Formerly traded on the Madrid Stock Exchange and part of the Spanish benchmark IBEX 35 stock index, Cintra was reacquired by its former owner Ferrovial in December 2009.

== History ==
The Company was founded in 1998 as a spin off from Ferrovial with the objective of focusing on Ferrovial's infrastructure development business. Initially Ferrovial's toll road assets were transferred to the new company and, subsequently, its car park assets were also transferred. A controlling stake continued to be owned by Ferrovial, which maintained a 66.88% shareholding. Cintra was reacquired in full by Ferrovial in December 2009. The deal was structured as a reverse takeover (despite both companies being publicly traded), resulting in Ferrovial taking Cintra's stock market listing and ISIN code.

Operating in 9 countries including Canada, Chile, Greece, Ireland, Portugal, Spain, and the United States, the company currently manages 24 highways totaling 1,468 km. Its asset portfolio includes 6 North American highway concessions: a minority stake in the 407 Express Toll Route (407 ETR) in Ontario and majority stakes in the LBJ Express, the North Tarrant Express, North Tarrant Express 35W in Texas, the I-66 Express in Virginia and the I-77 Express in North Carolina; as well as various highways on the Spanish peninsula, such as Madrid’s M45, the Autema, Ausol 1 & II highways, and the Radial 4.

In 2005, Cintra was named strategic partner of the State of Texas for the subsequent 50 years, in order to help develop the Trans-Texas Corridor. It was to be operated in a partnership with San Antonio, Texas based Zachry Construction Company. Widely seen as one of the most ambitious infrastructure projects in the United States, the project was eliminated as the scope and invasive nature of the project were exposed. Cintra continues working with the local administration to deliver infrastructure.

== Business model ==
The nature of Cintra’s business is to collect the revenues of the infrastructure assets they manage. Cintra's assets, especially its toll road concessions, typically require a large initial investment, yet then generate stable incomes over long periods of time. The weighted average lifespan of its infrastructure assets is reported to be close to 75 years.

Cintra derives around 70% of its revenues from its business activities outside of Spain. Canada, which reported €354m or 33% of Cintra’s total revenues in the first three quarters of 2008, is the country which contributes most in this regard.

Cintra's Car Parks business currently manages over 300,000 parking spaces in close to 140 cities in Spain and Andorra. It is the largest Spanish company, according to the number of spaces under management, and offers a varied and complete range of management services, including: underground parking, parking on public roads, residential parking and vehicle removal.

== Recent developments ==
In Jan 2009, Cintra was awarded two new significant projects: the A1 in Poland, and two segments of the regional corridor ‘North Tarrant Express’ located in the Dallas / Fort Worth area of Texas: The former concession was commissioned by the Polish infrastructure ministry to build, finance and operate three sections of the 180km A1 toll road between Strykow and Pyrzowice. It will require a total investment of approx. €2.1bn The latter concession, in which Cintra owns 75% of the winning consortium company (the other 25% is held by Meridiam), is for 52 years and will measure 21.4km. Assuming financing and other pending requirements are fulfilled as planned, the company’s total number of highways will increase to 25.

The company has recently expressed an interest in possible divestments of both its Car park and Chilean toll road businesses.

Cintra is a sponsor of the M3 Motorway being built in Ireland, through the Hill of Tara archaeological complex. The Irish Justice ruled in 2007 in favor of the project, which is supported by the Irish Green Party and local communities, citing a substantial boost to trade and communications.

A consortium composed of Cintra, Macquarie and Porr has emerged as preferred bidder for the D4 - R7 expressways public private partnership (PPP) project in Slovakia.

== Cintra's toll roads ==
- Toowoomba Second Range Crossing (TSRC)
- 407 ETR
- 407 EDG
- 407 East Phase 2
- LBJ Express
- North Tarrant Express
- North Tarrant Express 35W
- I-77 Express Lanes
- SH 130, Segments 5 & 6
- Ruta del Cacao Toll Road
- Central Greece Highway E65
- Ionian Roads Highway
- M3 Highway
- M4-M6 Highway
- Via do Infante Highway
- Euroscut Açores Highway
- Norte Litoral Highway
- ViaLivre
- Bratislava D4-R7 Ring Road (Slovakia)
- Alcalá-O´Donnell Highway
- Autopista del Sol Highway
- Autema Highway
- SerranoPark
- La Plata Highway (A-66)
- Almanzora Toll Road
- M8, M73 and M74 Highway
