= Trans-Texas Corridor =

Texas transportation network proposal

The Trans-Texas Corridor (TTC) was a proposal for a transportation network in the U.S. state of Texas that was conceived to be composed of a new kind of transportation modality known as supercorridors. The TTC was initially proposed in 2001 and after considerable controversy was discontinued by 2010 in the planning and early construction stages.

The network, as originally envisioned, would have been composed of a 4,000-mile (6,400 km) network of supercorridors up to 1,200 feet (370 m) wide to carry parallel links of tollways, rails, and utility lines. It was intended to route long-distance traffic around population centers, and to provide stable corridors for future infrastructure improvements–such as new power lines from wind farms in West Texas to the cities in the east–without the otherwise often lengthy administrative and legal procedures required to build on privately owned land. The tollway portion would have been divided into two separate elements: truck lanes and lanes for passenger vehicles. Similarly, the rail lines in the corridor would have been divided among freight, commuter, and high-speed rail. The Texas Department of Transportation (TxDOT) intended to "charge public and private concerns for utility, commodity or data transmission" within the corridor, in essence making a toll road for services such as water, electricity, natural gas, petroleum, fiber optic lines, and other telecommunications services. The network would have been funded by private investors and built and expanded as demand warrants.

In 2009, TxDOT decided to phase out the all-in-one corridor concept in favor of developing separate rights-of-way for road, rail, and other infrastructure using more traditional corridor widths for those modes. In 2010, official decision of "no action" was issued by the Federal Highway Administration, formally ending the project. The action eliminated the study area and canceled the agreement between TxDOT and ACS-Zachry.

In 2011, the Texas Legislature formally canceled the Trans-Texas Corridor with the passage of HB 1201.

== Network ==
The TTC was hoped to be a multi-use, statewide system that would have included new and existing highways, railways, and utility rights-of-way. According to the Houston Chronicle, on January 6, 2009, "In response to public outcry, the ambitious proposal to create the Trans-Texas Corridor network has been dropped and will be replaced with a plan to carry out road projects at an incremental, modest pace".

The network was proposed to include separate lanes for passenger and truck traffic, freight and high-speed commuter railways, and infrastructure for utilities, including water, oil, and gas pipelines; electricity; along with broadband and other telecommunications services. Although the model corridor design incorporates all of these elements running in parallel within a shared right-of-way, more recent plans suggested that existing rail and road corridors could be used for some components of the TTC. The model corridor design also represented the ultimate build-out of a corridor section, which would not have been realized for decades, if at all, as corridor segments and components were planned to be built based on traffic demand.

The Texas Department of Transportation (TxDOT) attempted to provide oversight for planning, construction, and maintenance while day-to-day operations would have been performed by private companies. In March 2005, TxDOT and ACS-Zachry signed a comprehensive development agreement which authorized $3.5 million of planning for TTC-35. This agreement did not designate the alignment, authorize construction, set toll rates or who collects them, and did not eliminate competition for future services. There were no contracts awarded to develop or finance any other corridor.

== Corridors ==
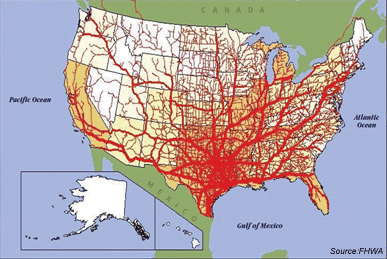
This map of the United States shows the volume of freight shipped through Texas, a major trade gateway from Mexico, as red lines branching out from the heart of the state. Only freight passing through Texas is included.

There were two initial trans-Texas corridors under consideration: One would have paralleled Interstate 35 (I-35), from Gainesville to Laredo and passing the Dallas-Fort Worth Metroplex, Austin and San Antonio. The other would have been an extension of the proposed I-69 corridor, generally following US 59, from Texarkana past Houston to either Laredo or the Rio Grande Valley. Both of these corridors have seen large increases in freight traffic demand over the past two decades due to increased trade with Mexico.

Two additional high priority potential corridors would have paralleled Interstate 45 from Dallas to Houston and Interstate 10 from El Paso to Orange.

=== TTC-35 ===
ACS-Zachry, a partnership between Spanish-based toll-road developer/operator ACS and Texas-based Zachry Construction, was awarded a $3.5 million contract to help plan the entire TTC-35 route in March 2005. The study area for Trans-Texas Corridor-35 (TTC-35) generally followed Interstate 35 from Laredo to the Oklahoma border. The environmental study for the project proceeded in two tiers: a first tier that refined the study area to a 10-mile (16 km) wide study corridor and a second tier that selected particular alignments for the various corridor components; where all corridor components (rail, highway, and utilities) were planned to be built adjacent to one another, this corridor would have been approximately 1,200 feet (370 m) wide.

The TTC-35 Tier 1 draft environmental impact statement (EIS) was published in April 2006. The final EIS was expected originally to be submitted to the Federal Highway Administration in 2007; as of April 2008, preparation of the final EIS was listed as "ongoing."

The draft EIS included 12 different study corridor alternatives by choosing among four variations along the route. The first variation, from Laredo to southeast of San Antonio, would have included either the current I-35 alignment until curving off to the east at a point south of San Antonio or would have followed a more direct route to the east. The study area for all alternatives continued northeast, paralleling I-35. The second variation would have either passed just to the east of the municipal boundaries along I-35 from Austin to Temple or further east. The third variation would have passed either to the west of Fort Worth or east of Dallas. The fourth variation was dependent on the eastern third variation and would have either rejoined the western third variation near the Oklahoma border or would have ended at the Oklahoma border near U.S. Route 75. The draft EIS designated a recommended preferred alternative corridor running to the east of I-35 and I-35E from near Gainesville to south of San Antonio, where the corridor would join I-35 to run south to Laredo.

On October 7, 2009, TxDOT officials announced that the department would recommend the "No Action Alternative", which effectively ended the efforts to develop the Interstate 35 corridor through the TTC concept.

==== SH 130 ====
State Highway 130 is a component of the Central Texas Turnpike System, much of which was thought likely to be incorporated into TTC-35. Segments 1-4 of SH 130 were built by Lone Star Infrastructure in the Austin metropolitan area as an eastern relief route for Interstate 35.

On June 28, 2006, ACS-Zachry reached a $1.3 billion agreement with the state to build segments 5 and 6 of SH 130, which could have represented the alignment of TTC-35's highway component between Interstate 10 at Seguin east of San Antonio and U.S. Route 79 near Taylor, Texas. According to the "Facility Plan of Finance," $412 million of financing for the project would be a federally-guaranteed loan under the Transportation Infrastructure Financing and Innovation Act, while the remaining financing would be from equity put forward by ACS-Zachry and bank loans from private lenders. Per the agreement, TxDOT would receive between 4.65% and 50% of toll revenues depending on the performance of the facility, with a smaller share due to TxDOT if TxDOT does not authorize posting of daytime speed limits of 80 mph (130 km/h) or higher along the route.

The ACS-Zachry Preliminary Financial Plan showed the expected toll revenue to be collected for Segment 5 and 6 at $14.9 billion over 50 years. The Preliminary Financial Plan for Segment 5 and 6 also showed $12.4 billion in earnings before taxes for the developer.

=== I-69/TTC ===
The second priority corridor for development was the Interstate 69 extension through Texas, which would have roughly followed the route of US 59 from Laredo via Houston to Carthage; there, the national I-69 corridor would have continued northeast into Louisiana and a spur route north to Texarkana would have continued along US 59 to Interstate 30. The original national plan for I-69 also included two spur routes to the Rio Grande Valley following US 281 and US 77; Texas was also studying a connection between the I-69 corridor near Laredo and Corpus Christi known as the "Port to Port Corridor".

Texas' portion of I-69 was originally planned to be developed as a traditional Interstate highway (with a mixed-use freeway component only), as it is being developed in other states, but was rolled into the Trans Texas Corridor concept soon after the latter's announcement due to their substantial overlap in purpose and scope. However, on June 11, 2008, TxDOT announced they planned to limit further study of I-69 to existing highway corridors–U.S. 59, U.S. 77, U.S. 281, U.S. 84, and SH 44–outside transition zones in the lower Rio Grande Valley, Laredo, Houston, and Texarkana. TxDOT also announced it was reverting to building I-69 as a standard 4-lane freeway instead of a multi-modal corridor as previously envisioned under the Trans-Texas Corridor concept. The latest plan called for adding a second carriageway and eliminating at-grade intersections along US-59 and US-77 in rural areas, with tolled bypasses around major cities and towns along the I-69 route.

According to the Deep East Texas Council of Governments, I-69 is a "future NAFTA Superhighway". It will enter the U.S. from the Mexican state of Tamaulipas.

=== Other potential corridors ===
Texas officials identified several other possible TTC corridors in the long-range plan. Interstate 10 through the southern part of the state, Interstate 20 from east of the Dallas-Fort Worth Metroplex to I-10 near Midland, along an extended Interstate 27 through western Texas, and a new terrain corridor along the northern Texas border paralleling sections of Interstate 30 from the Arkansas line at Texarkana to Fort Worth, US-287 from Fort Worth to Amarillo, and Interstate 40 from Amarillo to New Mexico.

== As alternatives to California seaports ==
One component of TTC-69 could have been part of a freight corridor that stretched from ports on the Pacific coast of Mexico to the Great Lakes. Depending on the level of traffic on that route, opponents argued that it would draw shipping traffic away from U.S. ports in California (San Diego, Long Beach and Los Angeles) in favor of Mexican seaports.

== Criticism ==
A citizens uprising was started in 2003 by Linda and David Stall of Fayette County, after reading a small notice in a trade paper about a hearing to be held by TxDOT in their rural town of Fayetteville, Texas. The Stalls notified their friends and neighbors. Eight hundred people showed up to a town hall with a seating capacity of 100. David Stall, a city manager, and Linda Stall, an escrow officer of a Texas title company, founded CorridorWatch.org to lead the building of a network of people who worked together to defeat the construction project. The Motorcycle Riders Caucus, active within both the Democratic and Republican parties, was categorically opposed to toll roads, and they were the most powerful caucus in Texas. Its chair Sputnik helped to develop Stall's network into an immense, diverse coalition of voters opposed to the corridor. As lobbyist for the Texas Motorcycle Rights Association, Sputnik convinced many state legislators to vote against it.

American author and conservative activist Jerome Corsi vehemently opposed the corridor and wrote a book titled The Late Great USA: NAFTA, the North American Union, and the Threat of a Coming Merger with Mexico and Canada. In 2002, the TTC was estimated to cost between US$145.2 billion to $183.5 billion to complete the entire 4,000-mile (6,400 km) network. Some criticisms have focused on the enormous width of the corridors. The planned system, if built out to its fullest extent, could have required about 584,000 acres (2,360 km^{2}) of land to be purchased or acquired through the state's assertion of eminent domain. Environmentalists were concerned about the effects of such wide corridors and private land owners have expressed concerns about property rights. Opponents also alleged that noise from the TTC would be of such a high volume that it would render the area within one mile (1.6 km) of the corridor uninhabitable by humans, at least during periods of peak traffic on all components of the corridor (freight and passenger rail, truck lanes, and passenger lanes) if they are colocated and built to full capacity.

According to TxDOT documents released in June 2002, "Governor Rick Perry wrote Transportation Commission Chairman John W. Johnson on January 30, 2002 to outline his vision for the Trans Texas Corridor. The governor asked the three-member commission to assemble the Texas Department of Transportation's top talent to create and deliver a Trans Texas Corridor implementation plan in 90 days."

In spite of public complaints–and both the 2006 platforms of the Texas Republican and Democratic parties opposing the plan–Governor Rick Perry continued to support the TTC.

Among the opponents to the corridor was the Republican State Representative Lois Kolkhorst of Washington County, who opposed on the basis that the project would undermine private property rights.

In the 2010 gubernatorial elections, Senator Kay Bailey Hutchison ran several attack advertisements regarding the TTC as Perry's attempts to expand government and take land from the average Texan. Ultimately, the advertisements did not have a great effect as Hutchison bowed out following her loss in the Republican primary.

== Financing ==
To help pay for building the roads and rails, the highways would have been partially financed through private investment. The investors would have then operated the highways as toll roads.

Based on The ACS-Zachry Preliminary Financial Plan (TTC-35 Development Agreement, Exhibit C) funding the TTC-35 Corridor awarded to ACS-Zachry showed that 22%(1) of the initial infrastructure costs were shown to be funded with equity provided by ACS-Zachry. The other 78% was to be provided by bank loans or bonds arranged by ACS-Zachry. Based on then-current federal regulations these bonds could have been tax-exempt. It was also noted in the financial plan that ACS-Zachry expected to have 12% return on investment for their equity partners. The 12% return was after taxes, which would have been approximately equivalent to 16% before taxes. The plan called for paying off the bank loans and the bonds prior to retiring the equity as shown in cash flow diagrams of the Preliminary Financial Plan (TTC-35 Development Agreement, Exhibit C). With usual bond financing there is a 3:1 ratio between total fees collected and value of capital infrastructure built. With TTC-35 the ratio was in the order of magnitude of 13:1. So while TTC-35 committed to construct $8 billion in infrastructure ACS-Zachry expected to collect $114 billion in toll revenues as shown in the preliminary plan. A report by the Texas State Auditor estimated the toll to be collected for TTC-35 to be $104 billion or more, confirming the order of magnitude of tolls collected.

== See also ==
- International Mid-Continent Trade Corridor
- Interstate 69
- North American SuperCorridor Coalition
