= Supercorridor =

A supercorridor is a proposed new type of transportation infrastructure in the United States.

A supercorridor would use swaths of land up to 1,200 feet (370 m) wide to carry parallel links of freeways, rails, and utility lines. The freeway portions would be divided into two separate elements: truck lanes and lanes for passenger vehicles. Similarly, the rail lines in the corridor would be divided among freight, commuter, and high-speed rail. Services expected to be carried in the utility corridor include water, electricity, natural gas and petroleum, plus fiber optic lines and other telecommunications services.

Supercorridors bypass traditional national borders, instead using inland ports known as "smartports". Border guards and customs officers would check the cargo at these inland ports.

== Proposals ==
No such supercorridors exist. The US State of Texas proposed the Trans-Texas Corridor in 2001 and eventually killed the project in 2011 before any of the project had been constructed. The Texas Department of Transportation concluded that it was more economical to route the transportation and utility corridors separately. The State of Washington studied a supercorridor commonly called Interstate 605 in 2003, but took no action.

The North American SuperCorridor Coalition advocates for the construction of several such corridors through the United States, Canada, and Mexico.

== Criticism ==
Critics of supercorridors complain that existing transportation infrastructure is not being invested in and maintained. Other critics are concerned about the environmental damage which might occur by creating a supercorridor. Still others are concerned about issues of national and state sovereignty, and the possible increased danger of terrorism, in the rapid transfer of individuals, goods and materials across borders. The study of Interstate 605 found that the corridor would be expensive and more than half of its length would not be economically feasible. Acquisition of large swaths of land for such corridors has created questions about property rights and the use of eminent domain.
