= Tyrone Brown (pardonee) =

African-American man from Texas (born 1973)

Tyrone Brown (born 1973) is an African-American man from Texas who, in 1990, was sentenced to a life term in a Texas maximum security prison and was kept incarcerated for 17 years after testing positive once for smoking marijuana while on probation for robbing a man of two dollars at the age of 17. No one was hurt in the robbery, and Brown had voluntarily returned the wallet to the victim. Brown's case attracted some attention in the press in 2006, and he was later granted a conditional pardon by Texas Governor Rick Perry. He was released on March 16, 2007.

== Early life ==
Brown was a high-school dropout and had been a victim of child abuse by his father, who had reportedly beat him.

== Original crime ==
When he was 17 years old, Brown and another 17-year-old committed a robbery. Brown and his partner confronted a man with a pistol and demanded that he give them his wallet. The victim handed his wallet to Brown, and after removing the two dollars that it contained, Brown returned the wallet to him. Judge Keith Dean in Dallas, Texas originally sentenced Brown to 10 years of probation for the crime, before changing his sentence to life in prison after he tested positive once for marijuana use.

== Press attention ==
Brown's case was contrasted in the press with the case of an influential white defendant; both defendants were sentenced by the same judge, Keith Dean. The other man had committed murder by shooting an unarmed prostitute in the back (and then taking money from his victim after shooting him), and had then violated his parole by repeatedly testing positive for cocaine use over a period of several years, breaking through the glass door of a woman's home to confront her in a dispute, living with at least two men who had multiple criminal convictions, and being arrested for crack cocaine possession while driving a congressman's car. Probation records indicated that the man had failed five drug tests over a three-year period. In contrast with the way Brown was treated, the other defendant was never sent to jail and received an early lifting of all of the usual conditions of probation.

After Brown's case and the contrasting treatment of the other man became well known, in part due to a feature report on the ABC News television program 20/20, the judge involved in the two cases, Keith Dean, failed to win re-election to his position.
