= Rick Perry veto controversy =

2014 prosecution in Texas, United States

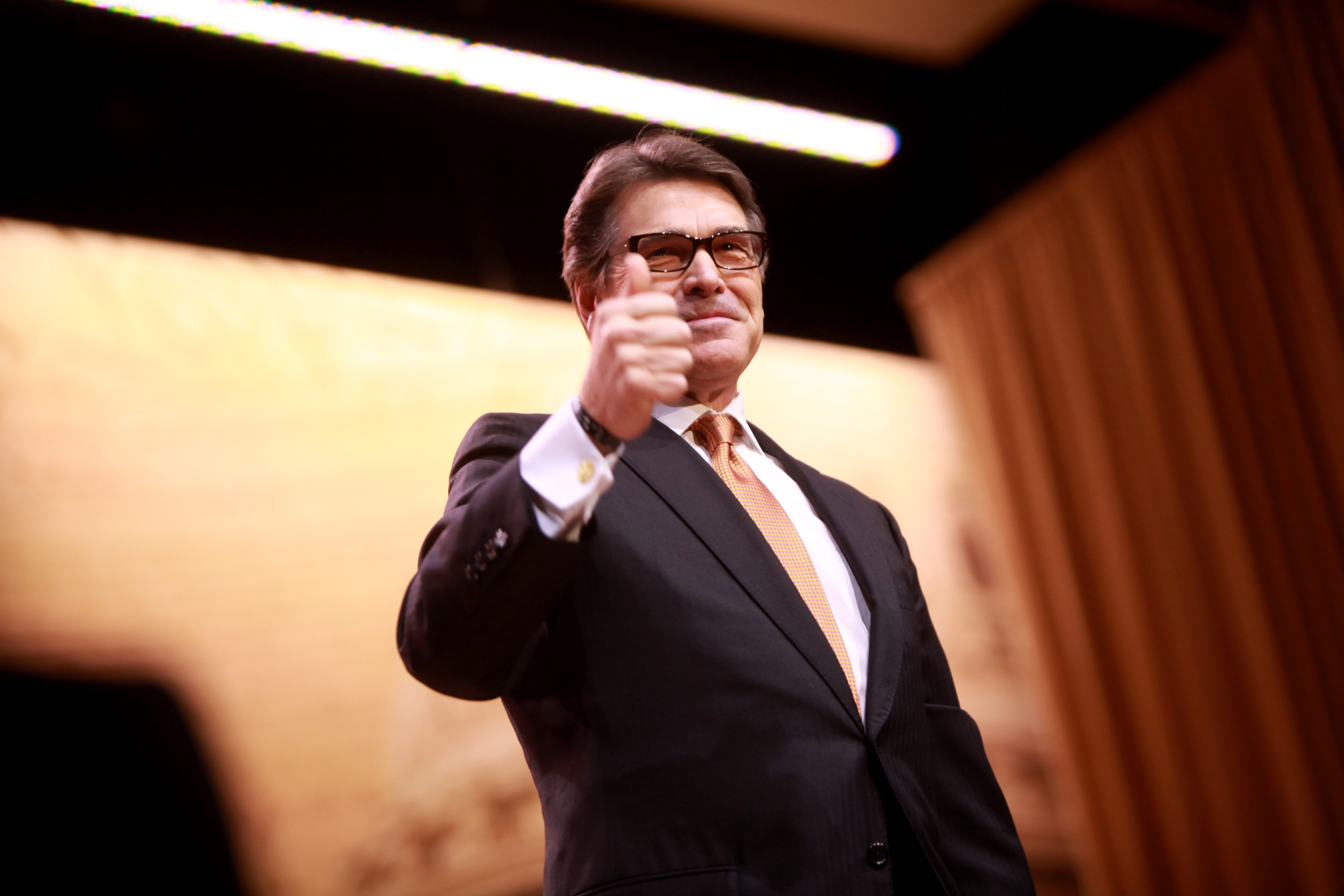
- Perry in 2014.
- Date: August 15, 2014
- County: Travis County, Texas
- Indictment Charges: Abuse of official capacity Coercion of a public servant
- Plea: Not guilty
- Judge: Bert Richardson
- Prosecutor: Michael McCrum
- Outcome: Prosecution ruled unconstitutional by the Texas Court of Criminal Appeals

On August 15, 2014, Texas Governor Rick Perry was indicted by a Travis County grand jury, but has since been cleared on all charges. The first charge of the indictment was abuse of official capacity, a first-degree felony, for threatening to veto $7.5 million in funding for the Public Integrity Unit, a state public corruption prosecutors department. The second charge, which has since been ruled unconstitutional, was coercion of a public servant, a third-degree felony, for seeking the resignation of Travis County District Attorney Rosemary Lehmberg, a Democrat, after she was convicted of drunk driving and incarcerated. Lehmberg was a district attorney in Travis County, Texas, and the Travis County DA's office managed the Public Integrity Unit's operations. The veto was seen as retribution for Lehmberg not stepping down. Perry pleaded not guilty to both charges.

On July 24, 2015, the Texas Third Court of Appeals dismissed the indictment for coercion of a public official on the basis that the indictment violated Perry's First Amendment rights to free speech. The indictment for abuse of power, a charge which his lawyers said is a misdemeanor, was likewise dismissed, in February 2016.

== Indictment ==
According to the complaint from Texans for Public Justice that led to the indictment, at the time of the veto, prosecutors in the Texas Public Integrity Unit had been investigating a state agency called the Cancer Prevention and Research Institute of Texas, described by The New York Times as "one of Perry’s signature initiatives [that] came under scrutiny by state lawmakers after accusations of mismanagement and corruption." According to Texas Democrats, if Perry could, he would appoint a Republican district attorney and hinder the investigation. According to officials in Perry's office, Lehmberg was offered a job at the DA's office and Perry offered to appoint her top lieutenant, a Democrat, as district attorney. Perry was never a target of the probe according to an affidavit by the investigator on the case. Texas Democrats have said that Perry didn't oppose other elected officials who were convicted of drunk driving in Texas. Republicans say that none of the other elected officials were responsible for an office responsible for the ethics and integrity of public officials.

Billy Ray Stubblefield, chief judge of Texas' Third Judicial District, presides over the case. Michael McCrum was appointed special prosecutor by Bert Richardson, a former judge of the 379th District Court in Bexar County and the incoming 2015 Place 3 judge of the Texas Court of Criminal Appeals. Richardson had been selected by Judge Stubblefield to handle the grand jury investigation. Jay Root of the Texas Tribune said "Lehmberg and other Travis County officials recused themselves from the case and are not prosecuting it" noting that the prosecutor was appointed by Richardson, a "Republican judge".

== Response ==
Rick Perry's supporters called the charges political and partisan, and several Democratic commentators, including David Axelrod, Jonathan Prince, Matthew Yglesias, and Jonathan Chait have stated that they believe the charges were either weak or unwarranted.

Harvard Law School professor Alan Dershowitz stated that "it's so important to put a stop to it now, to say the criminal law is reserved for real crimes, not for political differences where a party in power or out of power gets revenge against the other party. That's just not the way to use the criminal justice [system]." On August 16, 2014, Perry called the indictment a political move and an abuse of power, and vowed to fight the charges. The Texas Democratic Party asked Perry to resign.

Major newspapers including The New York Times ("appears to be the product of an overzealous prosecution"), The Los Angeles Times ("the courts are the wrong place to settle political scores"), The Washington Post ("The grand jury, however, would criminalize Mr. Perry’s conduct by twisting the pertinent statutes into a pair of pretzels"), and USA Today ("Politics as usual should not be a violation of criminal law") criticized the indictment. The Dallas Morning News editorially said that the key question for the jury to decide after hearing all the evidence is “[d]id our governor violate state law in how and why he withheld that funding?”

Eugene Volokh, UCLA School of Law professor, writing in The Washington Post said that the Texas Constitution gives Perry the right to veto bills and he cannot be prosecuted for using his lawful and constitutional authority as Texas Governor. Volokh said Perry's statements in the media threatening the veto are protected by the First Amendment to the U.S. Constitution and cited the Texas Courts of Appeals's case State v. Hansen as support for the First Amendment protection of Perry, where the court stated, "Coercion of a lawful act by a threat of lawful action is protected free expression".

Other news reports, however, have highlighted the fact that that additional district attorneys in Texas, who were Republican, had also been charged with DUI's during his governorship and against whom Perry took no similar action as he directed against the Democrat, Lehmberg, of Travis county. A spokesman for Rick Perry said, however, "They were not in charge of the Public Integrity Unit, which receives state taxpayer dollars...we don’t have any evidence that they behaved as inappropriately and abusively to law enforcement as Lehmberg did."

== Defense ==
On August 19, 2014, Perry arrived at the Travis County jail where he was processed, photographed for his mug shot, finger printed, and released. Perry pleaded not guilty, and waived arraignment. On August 25, attorneys for Perry filed a writ of habeas corpus application to dismiss the felony charges against him.

Perry hired former Clinton White House special counsel Mark Fabiani, GOP attorney Bobby Burchfield, defense lawyer David Botsford, Republican lawyer Ben Ginsberg, former Texas Supreme Court Justice Tom Phillips, and former McCain/Palin consultant Steve Schmidt to help him with legal issues and strategy around the indictment. Leading the team was Houston trial lawyer and Texas A&M University Regent Tony Buzbee.

On September 8, 2014, in the second motion to dismiss the charges brought against the governor, lawyers for Perry referenced the French king, Louis XIV. Perry's lawyers stated that Perry has "no more has custody or possession of the State's general revenue funds than does any Texan. No governor can say of his or her state what the Sun King said of France: "L'etat c'est moi."

On October 3, 2014, Perry's lawyers filed another motion to have the charges dismissed, arguing that Lehmberg did not file a motion to have herself recused from the case and there was never an order from a judge recusing her from the case, contrary to the requirements of Texas state law. Also, Perry's lawyers argued that McCrum did not file the documentation that McCrum was required to file to take the oath of office. On the oath of office form from McCrum, McCrum's signature was missing and it was signed by Judge Richardson instead of McCrum. A state district judge rejected this motion to dismiss in November, while leaving all other motions to quash and writs still pending.

On January 28, 2015, District Judge Bert Richardson of San Antonio again ruled that Perry's motion to quash and dismiss the indictment "does not challenge the sufficiency of the indictment." Special prosecutor Michael Crum has stated that the case is stronger than it may outwardly appear, and that it should be heard by a jury.

On February 13, 2015, special prosecutors Mike McCrum and David Gonzalez, amended the indictment to fill out their argument that Perry's action was illegal.

== Further developments in 2015 ==
In a survey conducted by Public Policy Polling (PPP) in Iowa a week after the indictment, Perry’s net favorability rating among Republicans went up 7 percentage points.

The Third Court of Appeals considered an interlocutory appeal of a decision by the trial judge, Bert Richardson, to not throw out the case. On July 24, 2015, the Texas Third Court of Appeals dismissed the indictment for coercion of a public official, on the basis that the indictment violates his First Amendment rights to free speech. The more serious indictment for abuse of power remained against Perry, carrying a potential prison sentence of five to 99 years, and was later dismissed in February 2016 by the Texas Court of Criminal Appeals.

=== Mugshot photo ===
A Political Action Committee supporting Perry, RickPAC, used Perry's mugshot on a US$25 T-shirt to raise money, the front featuring Perry’s mugshot with a stamp that says "WANTED for securing the border and defeating Democrats", and on the back featuring Lehmberg’s mugshot with the caption "GUILTY for driving while intoxicated and perversion of justice." The mugshot went viral when it was released and people added their own touches and overlays to the photo in social media.

== Dismissal of all charges in 2016 ==
The Texas Court of Criminal Appeals dismissed all charges in February 2016. The court was divided 6-2, and its majority opinion by Presiding Judge Sharon Keller was accompanied by two concurring opinions and two dissents.

The court dismissed the abuse-of-official-capacity charge, and upheld the earlier dismissal of the coercion-of-a-public-servant charge. The former charge was dismissed under the separation of powers provision of the Texas Constitution, a provision which the court interpreted as forbidding prosecution of a governor for his veto, using the abuse-of-official-capacity statute. As to the latter charge, the court agreed with the lower court that it would violate the free speech principles in the First Amendment to the United States Constitution if a governor who threatens a veto is prosecuted using the coercion-of-a-public-servant statute.

The court also addressed the procedural question of whether Perry could make his separation-of-powers argument in a pretrial habeas corpus application, followed by an interlocutory appeal (i.e. an appeal before the end of the lower court proceedings). On this question, the court said: "The nature of the constitutional right at issue entitles him to raise these claims by pretrial habeas corpus." The previous understanding had been that a defendant seeking pretrial habeas relief had to successfully argue that a statute was facially unconstitutional, rather than unconstitutional as applied (which was Perry's argument).

According to the U.S. Supreme Court, the U.S. Congress cannot limit the veto power of the U.S. president, and the Texas Court of Criminal Appeals here decided that the same principle applies to the governor. Thus, said the court, the Texas Legislature cannot turn a veto into a crime: "When the only act that is being prosecuted is a veto, then the prosecution itself violates separation of powers," wrote Judge Keller.

This dismissal ended the abuse-of-power accusations that had detrimentally affected Perry's unsuccessful campaign for president in 2015. The case also cost Perry more than $2 million in attorney fees.

== See also ==
- Tom DeLay campaign finance trial
