= Texans for Public Justice =

- Abbreviation: TPJ
- Formation: 1997
- Founder: Craig McDonald
- Type: 501(c)4
- Tax ID no.: 74-2804942
- Headquarters: Austin, Texas
- Region served: Texas
- Director: Craig McDonald
- Research Director: Andrew Wheat
- Revenue: $248,367 (FY 2013)
- Website: tpj.org

Texans for Public Justice (TPJ) is an Austin-based non-profit group founded in 1997 to take on political corruption and corporate abuses in Texas, United States. Their early focus was on tracking campaign contributions in Texas and elsewhere, including contributions to George W. Bush's campaign in the 2000 and 2004 US presidential elections. The group lodged the original complaints which led to the now overturned conviction of former US Representative Tom Delay, as well as former Texas Governor Rick Perry's August 2014 felony indictment.

It has been accused of being "funded by out-of-state foundations and rich individuals to specialize in "lawfare" against state officials of whose policies they disapprove". Craig McDonald, a Michigan native, founded the organization and is its current Director. He began his career on the political left via the public interest movement in the late-1970s working as a community organizer. Working for Ralph Nader's Public Citizen activist group in 1984, he went on to create the Texas office of Public Citizen in that same year.

According to TPJ, its board of directors includes, in addition to McDonald, two other veterans of Nader's Public Citizen; a former aide to the late Texas Democratic Gov. Ann Richards who was also a Clinton-Gore organizer; and a journalist who "has written for numerous progressive publications." McDonald claims that TPJ only reveals its institutional funders and doesn't reveal its individual supporters for fear of political retaliation. He said he doesn't consider that policy in conflict with the group's work in highlighting the impact of money in politics. The group receives monies from George Soros, Open Society Foundations, the Piper Foundation, the Sunlight Foundation, the Winkler Family Foundation, and Good Jobs First. Its 2005 tax return showed "Texas trial lawyers as major contributors."
