= North American integration =

Economic and political integration of the United States, Canada and Mexico

North American integration is the process of economic and political integration in North America, largely centred on the integration of Canada, Mexico, and the United States.

== History ==
=== North American Accord and free trade ===
While Ronald Reagan was organizing his run for the 1980 U.S. presidential election, two of his policy advisers, Richard V. Allen and Peter Hannaford, were traveling with him in Europe. They developed and proposed to him an idea regarding cooperation in North America, especially in the energy sector. A few months later, another colleague, domestic policy advisor Martin Anderson, suggested calling the proposal the "North American Accord". It would create a common market among the United States, Canada, and Mexico. Reagan saw this proposal as a solution to undocumented immigration and other problems between the U.S. and its neighbours. Despite being greeted with some scepticism and resistance from leaders in Canada and Mexico, Reagan endorsed the idea when he formally announced his candidacy in November 1979.

Reagan eventually found a sympathetic voice in Canada after a 1985 report by a Canadian government commission suggested pursuing a free trade agreement with the United States. After becoming prime minister in 1984, Brian Mulroney responded by initiating discussions with the United States and these negotiations culminated with the signing of the Canada-U.S. Free Trade Agreement (FTA) in 1988. This agreement served as a template for American negotiations with Mexico that were eventually expanded to include Canada in what became the North American Free Trade Agreement (NAFTA).

=== Vicente Fox and NAFTA-Plus ===
Jorge Castañeda, serving as a policy advisor to then Mexican presidential candidate Vicente Fox, was influenced by Robert Pastor's ideas on deepening integration of NAFTA and encouraged Fox to adopt these policies as part of his campaign. Before and after the election Fox made appearances on several U.S. news programs advocating greater integration including a plan to open up the U.S.–Mexico border within ten years. Around this time a number of proposals were also put forward for an expansion of the NAFTA agreement, generically called "NAFTA-Plus." After taking office, Vicente Fox proposed one such plan to President George W. Bush of the United States and Canadian Prime Minister Jean Chrétien that would move towards a supranational union in the form of the European Union. Fox's proposal was rejected by President Bush.

=== Security and Prosperity Partnership ===
The Security and Prosperity Partnership of North America (SPP) was formed at a meeting of North American leaders on March 23, 2005. It was described by the leaders of Canada (Paul Martin), Mexico (Fox) and the United States (Bush), as a dialogue to provide greater cooperation on security and economic issues. A number of academics and government officials at the time viewed the SPP as moving North America towards greater integration.

In a private round-table discussion on March 15, 2006, U.S. on the Security and Prosperity Partnership Commerce Secretary Carlos Gutierrez advocated creating a North American Competitiveness Council composed of business leaders from all three NAFTA countries in order to ensure sustainable regional integration and address issue that might impede such integration. Just over two weeks later the council was formed as an SPP working group. It has submitted several reports suggesting new measures on deepening integration of the NAFTA region including a Regulatory Cooperation Framework and a trilateral tax treaty to "provide clear rules governing tax matters affecting trade and investment between the three countries".

Several advocates of integration saw the SPP as being insufficient. One criticism was that the governments lacked a "vision of what North America might become" and as such did not provide the proper context that would allow the initiative to deal with barriers to deeper integration. Another problem seen with the dialogue was that it operated from a federal perspective at the exclusion of state, provincial, and local government involvement. The separation between the security aspect of the initiative and the economic aspect was also seen as a failing of the initiative.

=== USMCA ===
The United States–Mexico–Canada Agreement (USMCA) replaced NAFTA on July 1, 2020.

== Two-speed integration ==
Several works have discussed taking a two-speed approach to North American integration, with Canada and the United States pursuing deeper integration, with Mexico to be included at a later date. This has been likened to the European Union's multi-speed approach towards integration with the United States advancing in its integration with Canada faster than with Mexico.

In this scenario, the Canada–United States border would be opened up to goods, services, and people. Part of this could include the formation of a security perimeter around the two countries with reduced focus on security along the national borders. The perimeter approach has been discussed publicly by officials of the U.S. and Canadian governments. It has been suggested this approach could raise concerns that such an agreement would set a precedent for a later agreement of the same kind with Mexico.

=== Two-speed integration in practice ===
==== Harper-Obama border deal ====
On February 4, 2011, Harper and Obama issued a "Declaration on a Shared Vision for Perimeter Security and Economic Competitiveness" and announced the creation of the Canada–United States Regulatory Cooperation Council (RCC) "to increase regulatory transparency and coordination between the two countries."

== Country comparison ==
	Canada	Mexico	United States of America
Flag	Canada	Mexico	United States
Coat of arms	Canada	Mexico	United States
Population	40,513,781 (as of 2023)	128,455,566 (as of 2023)	334,914,895 (as of 2023)
Total Area	3,855,100 square miles (9,985,000 km^{2})	761,610 square miles (1,972,600 km^{2})	3,535,363 square miles (9,156,550 km^{2})
Population density	4.3/km^{2}	66.1/km^{2}	37.5/km^{2}
Exclusive Economic Zone	5,559,077 km^{2}	3,269,386 km^{2}	11,351,000 km^{2}
Capital city	Ottawa	Mexico City	Washington
Currency	Canadian Dollar	Mexican Peso	United States Dollar
GDP Nominal ($, in millions) 2023	$2,117,805	$1,811,468	$27,067,158 ^{(incl. Puerto Rico)}
GDP Nominal ($) 2023 Per Capita	$53,247	$13,804	$80,412

== Organizations involved ==
The following is a list of organizations that are by varying degrees associated with the integration efforts of North America. Some are policy think tanks while others are involved in specific facets of integration. Most, but not all, are trilaterally oriented (i.e., representing Canada, Mexico and the United States); a few tend to be bilateral organizations such as for Canada and the U.S.

Organization	Description	Home country	Countries of Organization's participants	Official Website
Advisory Committee on International Economic Policy (ACIEP)		U.S.	U.S.	ACIEP membership
Annexation.ca	A movement dedicated to the exploration of the potentialities for a democratic annexation of Canada to the USA.	Canada	Canada & U.S.	Annexation.ca
Border Environment Cooperation Commission (BECC)	Aims to promote binational health and environmental projects along the U.S.-Mexican border and partners with the North American Development Bank (NADB).	Mexico & U.S.	Mexico & U.S.	BECC
Canadian Council of Chief Executives		Canada		CCCE
Center for North American Studies (CNAS) at American University	Educates and promotes policy debates between governments about the North American Region.	U.S.	U.S.	CNAS
Center for U.S. and Mexican Law at University of Houston Law Center	A research center devoted to the independent, critical study of Mexican law and legal aspects of U.S. – Mexico relations.	U.S.	Mexico & U.S.	Center for U.S. and Mexican Law
Digital Government Society of North America		U.S.	Canada, Mexico, United States (potentially)	DGSNA ∙ DGRC
North American Aerospace Defense Command (NORAD)	Handles aerospace warning and control for North America and awareness of activities in U.S. and Canadian maritime areas and as well as inland waterways.	U.S.	Canada and U.S.	NORAD
North American Center for Transborder Studies (NACTS) at Arizona State University	A center for scholars regarding the trilateral issues in North America.	U.S.		NACTS
North American Development Bank (NADB)	Created under the guidance of NAFTA to focus on environmental issues along the U.S.–Mexican border and partners with the Border Environment Cooperation Commission (BECC).		Mexico and U.S.	NADB
North American Forum				North American Forum
North American Forum on Integration		Canada	Canada, Mexico & U.S.	NAFI
The North American Institute (NAMI)				NAMI
North American Integration and Development (NAID Center)				NAID
United States Northern Command (USNORTHCOM) (a.k.a. NORAD-U.S. Northern Command Command Center)	A "central collection and coordination facility for a worldwide system of sensors designed to provide the commander and the leadership of Canada and the U.S. with an accurate picture of any aerospace threat"	U.S.	U.S.	USNORTHCOM
Security and Prosperity Partnership Of North America (SPP)	Leads an agenda "to enhance the competitive position of North American industries in the global marketplace", prevent & respond to threats in North America, and "ensure the streamlined movement of legitimate travelers and cargo across our shared borders"		Canada, Mexico and U.S.	SPP in Canada ∙ SPP in Mexico ∙ SPP in the U.S.
Transatlantic Economic Council (TEC)				TEC∙ EU-USA TEC
United North America	A non-profit organization that advocates the admittance of Canadian provinces into the United States as new states of the Union.	Canada	Canada	United North America

== Integration by topic ==
=== Energy integration ===
In the early twenty-first century there is a clearly established North American energy market, which is in some respects quite distinct from global energy trends. The United States had been the world's largest energy importer for the later third of the twentieth century and the first few years of the twenty-first. Canada and Mexico are exporters of energy to the United States. In 2008, Canada was the largest foreign supplier to the US of all forms of power – oil and gas, electricity and uranium – exporting more than Can$125 billion annually across its southern border. However, by 2012 increased oil and natural gas production in the United States had driven North American oil and gas prices down compared to world prices. The price spread between American West Texas Intermediate oil and European Brent crude was as much as US$20, with the prices spread between US NYMEX gas and European gas even greater.

Proposals to build large cross-border energy infrastructure projects are controversial. The proposed Keystone XL pipeline between Canada and the United States was rejected by President Obama in 2012, for example.

=== Foreign investment ===
The Canada-US and North American Free Trade agreements (specifically Chapter 11 of NAFTA) have essentially removed most barriers to cross-border expansions and takeovers within North America, with a few notable exceptions. Most major sectors are highly integrated, with the most important companies working in all three countries. Sectors that were still not highly integrated in 2012 were healthcare, banking, telecoms, broadcasting, and airlines, largely because these areas have been "ring-fenced" within the agreements, or are subject to other legislative hurdles. In Mexico the energy sector is also ring-fenced by provisions in the Mexican constitution that protect the state oil company, Pemex, from privatization. By contrast, the United States lacks any large government energy company, and Canada's attempt to create one (Petro-Canada) was short-lived.

=== Political integration ===
As of 2016, there have been no official proposals to create a supranational governing body in North America such as the European Union. There have been some private discussions of a "North American Union", and a great deal of conspiracy theories surround such discussions, but no actual official moves toward such a scheme. There is also a small minority in Canada that is interested in "annexationism", or having the United States absorb Canada.

== Alternatives ==
Besides North American integration, the three countries in question could pursue (and have pursued in the past) several other policies which could be complementary to North American integration, or in direct opposition to it. On the one hand, the countries in question could pursue economic nationalism or protectionism by reestablishing trade barriers between themselves. This type of policy is embraced by economic nationalist groups such as the Council of Canadians. As well, the three countries could eliminate barriers with countries outside the North American continent either individually or in concert, thereby eliminating North America as a distinct trade bloc, this is potentially the outcome of any trans-Atlantic or trans-Pacific free trade agreement, or global trade liberalization through the World Trade Organization. Or by doing both of the above, a country could withdraw from North American integration while pursuing integration with other partners. As an example, before the 1940s Canada's trade strategy was often to pursue free trade within the British Empire, rather than North America. And this policy has gained some renewed interest in the forms of proposed a Commonwealth free trade area and a proposed CANZUK freedom of movement area. Likewise, Mexico has also pursued trade integration with the rest of Latin America at different points, including joining the Community of Latin American and Caribbean States in 2010, which pointedly excluded Canada and the United States.

It is also possible to support North American integration in principle while opposing it in practice and advocating for more environmental and labor integration, perhaps mirroring the economic integration of the European social model or other ideas from the alter-globalization movement.

== See also ==
- CANAMEX Corridor
- Commission for Environmental Cooperation
- Council of Canadians
- Digital Government Society
- European integration
- Federalism
- Intergovernmentalism
- Neofunctionalism
- North American Development Bank
- North American energy independence
- North American Forum on Integration
- North American Leaders' Summit
- North American SuperCorridor Coalition
- North American Transportation Statistics Interchange
- Organization of American States
- Supranationalism
- Transatlantic Free Trade Area
- Trans-Pacific Partnership
