= Roberto Velasco Álvarez =

Mexican lawyer and politician

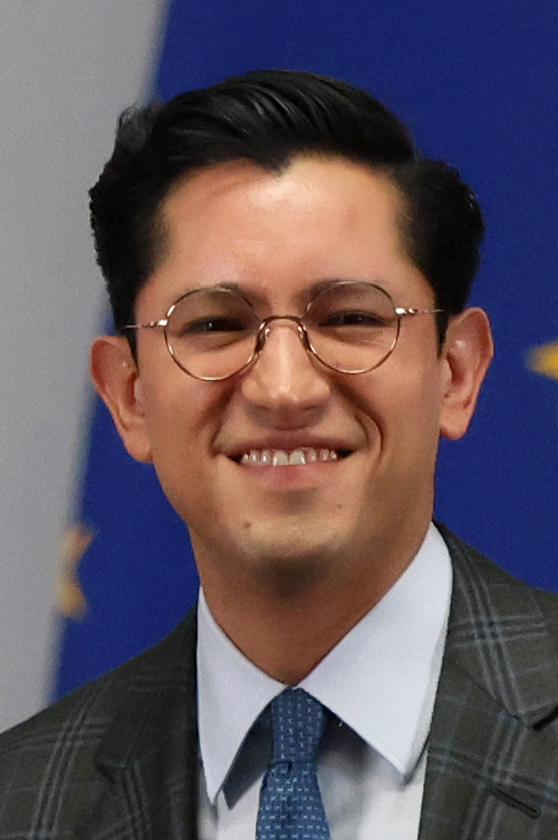
- Velasco in 2026

Secretary of Foreign Affairs
- Incumbent
- Assumed office 8 April 2026
- President: Claudia Sheinbaum
- Preceded by: Juan Ramón de la Fuente

Personal details
- Born: September 14, 1987 (age 39)
- Education: Ibero-American University (LLB); University of Chicago (MPP)

Roberto Velasco Álvarez (born September 14, 1987) is a Mexican politician and diplomat. He has served as Secretary of Foreign Affairs since April 1, 2026, during the administration of President Claudia Sheinbaum.

In 2013, he graduated with a law degree from the Universidad Iberoamericana in Mexico City. He also holds a master's degree in public policy from the University of Chicago.

Since June 2020, Roberto Velasco has coordinated North American policy at Mexico's Secretariat of Foreign Affairs (SRE), leading multiple high-level bilateral and trilateral negotiations on security, human mobility, economy, border, and water, among others.Between December 2018 and May 2020, he served as Director General for Public Affairs at the SRE.

While in Chicago, he was editor-in-chief of the Chicago Policy Review, a magazine published by students at University of Chicago's Harris School of Public Policy and collaborated in the office of the city's mayor.

Velasco Álvarez also has extensive experience in federal, state and local government in Mexico, including positions in the Mexico City Legislative Assembly, the Mexico City borough of Miguel Hidalgo, and the Secretariat of the Economy.

Additionally, he has held several party positions since 2006, always in support of former president Andrés Manuel López Obrador's political movement. He now works with President Claudia Sheinbaum Pardo.

== Political career ==
His beginnings as a public official were in the Legislative Assembly of the Federal District. He also has experience in the local administration of Mexico City. In 2017, he collaborated in the North America Regional Direction of the Mexican Government trust that promoted international trade and investment. In 2008, he was the leader of the Youth of the Convergencia Party (now Movimiento Ciudadano) in the Federal District.

After the July 2018 presidential elections, Velasco Álvarez received an invitation from former Secretary Marcelo Ebrard Casaubon to support the transition process of the new cabinet. In December of the same year, he was appointed Director-General for Public Affairs at the Secretariat of Foreign Affairs.

In 2019, Roberto Velasco was part of the Mexican delegation appointed by President López Obrador to prevent the imposition of tariff rates on Mexican goods, which would have caused a trade war with its most important trading partner, the United States. US president Donald Trump announced that his government would impose tariff rates on all goods imported from Mexico. The amount would start at 5% and increase to 25% if Mexico did not take measures to curb migrant flows to the US.

In charge of public affairs at the Secretariat of Foreign Affairs, Velasco Álvarez published opinion pieces in media outlets such as The Washington Post, The Wall Street Journal, and El País. He also coordinated with Canal Once the production of the series "Mexico Abroad" on the foreign policy agenda of López Obrador's government.

In June 2020, Foreign Secretary Ebrard appointed Roberto Velasco as General Director for North America, a position in which he led negotiations with the United States to resolve the crisis of shared water management under the 1944 Water Treaty.

Likewise, Velasco was a key figure in ensuring that in July of that same year, the official working visit of President López Obrador to his US counterpart, Donald Trump, took place. The visit focused on celebrating the entry into force of the USMCA, where Mexico and the United States reaffirmed the strategic alliance between both countries.

Subsequently, in December 2020, he was appointed Acting Undersecretary for North America.

In February 2021, Roberto Velasco presented the Work Plan for North America of the Secretariat of Foreign Affairs in the Senate of the Republic. At the end of his speech, senators from the various parliamentary groups carried out a round of questions. At the end of the question and answer session, he received the support of the President of the Foreign Relations Committee, Héctor Vasconcelos, who stated that "the Senate of the Republic congratulates itself on the meeting held on the plan of activities and responsibilities for North America" and expressed on behalf of the joint committees "their best wishes for the success of the tasks entrusted to Master Velasco".

With the changes made in the Official Gazette of the Federation in June 2021, Velasco Álvarez assumed the position of Chief Officer for North America at the Secretariat of Foreign Affairs.

In charge of Mexico's foreign policy in North America, Roberto Velasco reactivated some of the institutional mechanisms that had been paused during the administration of President Donald Trump.

First, the U.S.-Mexico High-Level Economic Dialogue (HLED) stands out, headed by US Vice President Kamala Harris, Secretary Marcelo Ebrard, and Secretary Tatiana Clouthier. The HLED seeks to advance strategic economic, social and commercial priorities that are central to spurring regional economic growth, creating jobs, investing in our people and reducing inequalities and poverty in all of its dimensions.

Additionally, he resumed the High-Level Security Dialogue (HLSD) and led the Mexican delegation that negotiated the Bicentennial Framework that replaced the Mérida Initiative: a plan aimed at reducing addictions and homicides, arms trafficking, human and drug trafficking, among other common priority objectives of Mexico and the United States.

Velasco Álvarez was also an important figure in the realization of the 9th North American Leaders' Summit (NALS) held on November 18, 2021, in Washington D.C.; Presidents López Obrador and Joe Biden, along with Prime Minister Justin Trudeau, met with the aim of working towards a more prosperous, equal, and secure North America.

Likewise, the Chief Officer for North America worked with Foreign Affairs Minister Marcelo Ebrard to finalize a working visit by President López Obrador to his US counterpart, Joe Biden, on July 12, 2022. The conversation between the two leaders allowed progress on a wide range of bilateral relationship issues such as border, security, economy, climate change, and labor mobility.

== Personal life ==
Velasco is openly gay.
