= Canada-United States Union =

Canada-United States Union may refer to either of the following proposals:

- Movements for the annexation of Canada to the United States
- North American Union
