= Regulatory Cooperation Council =

International trade organization

Canada–United States Regulatory Cooperation Council (RCC)
Member countries:
Canada
United States

The Canada–United States Regulatory Cooperation Council (RCC) is an initiative between Canada and the United States with a mandate of working together "to promote economic growth, job creation, and benefits to our consumers and businesses through increased regulatory transparency and coordination" between the two countries.

Announced by President Obama and Prime Minister Harper in February 2011, the RCC recognizes that regulatory differences and duplicative procedures impose unnecessary requirements and costs on citizens, businesses and economies, thus slowing down trade and investment and limiting timely access to products. It therefore seeks to eliminate these unnecessary requirements, making it easier for Canadian and American firms to do business on both sides of the border.

The Canadian Senate Standing Committee on National Finance (Note: Standing Committee on National Finance examined "the potential reasons for price discrepancies in respect of certain goods between Canada and the United States, given the value of the Canadian dollar and the effect of cross border shopping on the Canadian economy; That, in conducting such a study, the committee take particular note of differences between Canada and the United States including, but not limited to, market sizes, transportation costs, tariff rates, occupancy costs, labour costs, taxes and fees, regulations, mark-up (Standing Committee on National Finance 2013-02)." The Committee was unable to explain why Canadians paid 11% more than Americans for identical goods, even after considering tariffs, etc and in spite of a dollar at par for many years and observed that "As more Canadian consumers become aware of smartphone applications and Internet sites for price shopping and comparison, and become price-savvy consumers, competitive pressures in Canada will increase and the price for products in Canada will converge to U.S. prices.") however, in its report entitled The Canada USA Price Gap recommended that "the Government of Canada, through the Canada–United States Regulatory Cooperation Council, continue to integrate the safety standards between Canada and the United States with the intent to reduce the price discrepancies without compromising the safety needs of the two countries (page vi and 27)." In his testimony before the Senate Committee, Bank of Canada governor Mark Carney said results of the bank's September 2011 survey showed a major price gap, with Canadians paying 11% more than Americans for identical goods. He notes that this was an improvement over April 2011 when the difference was 18%.

The agreement is not a legally binding treaty, and relies on the political will and ability of the executives of both governments to implement the terms of the agreement. These types of executive agreements are routine—on both sides of the Canada-U.S. border.

== Joint Action Plan ==
Joint Action Plan issues include

- Agriculture & Food (Food Safety, Agricultural Production, Marketing)
- Transportation (Surface: Road & Rail, Marine, Other Transportation Issues)
- Health And Personal Care Products And Workplace Chemicals

Health Canada and the United States Food and Drug Administration (FDA) under the RCC mandate, undertook the "first of its kind" initiative by selecting "as its first area of alignment common cold indications for certain over-the-counter antihistamine ingredients (GC 2013-01-10)."

- Environment
- Cross-Sectoral Issues (Small Business Lens, Regulatory Approach To Nanomaterials).

== Goals ==
The mandate is to work together "to facilitate closer regulatory cooperation between the two countries and enhance economic competitiveness by aligning regulatory systems where appropriate, while maintaining high levels of protection for health, safety and the environment.".

== History ==
Since its launch in February 2011, progress under the RCC has been ongoing:

February 4, 2011 – Washington, DC Prime Minister Stephen Harper and U.S. President Barack Obama announced the creation of a U.S.–Canada Regulatory Cooperation Council (RCC) to better align "regulatory approaches. The goal of regulatory cooperation is to remove unnecessary requirements and align standards. Such differences and duplications slow down trade and investment, limit timely access to products, and add costs to manufacturers and consumers. The RCC's work will focus on addressing these, thus making it easier for Canadian and American firms to do business on both sides of the border."

December 7, 2011 – Washington, DC Prime Minister Harper and President Obama signed the Joint Action Plan which called on both countries to foster new approaches to regulatory cooperation and serve as a template for future efforts between Canada and the U.S. The initial Joint Action Plan provided an opportunity to enhance Canada-U.S. regulatory cooperation through the identification of specific regulatory issues and challenges that agencies on both sides of the border would work together to resolve or improve.

An editorial in The Globe and Mail praised the agreement for giving Canada the ability to track whether failed refugee claimants have left Canada via the U.S. and for eliminating "duplicated baggage screenings on connecting flights".

May 2012 – Washington, DC President Obama issued Executive Order 13609 Promoting International Regulatory Cooperation, an effort that targets "… strengthening institutional mechanisms for facilitating international regulatory cooperation and reflecting a commitment to regulatory cooperation going forward.”

August 2014 – Canada and the United States released the RCC Joint Forward Plan, which enables a new approach to regulatory cooperation through: new senior level bi-national governance and leadership between federal regulatory partners; the establishment of an RCC specific work planning process; and the creation of new channels for stakeholders to provide input to Canadian and U.S. regulators.

May 2015 – Details of work under the RCC Joint Forward Plan were released via 12 Regulatory Partnership Statements (RPS) between 16 similarly mandated departments and agencies. These federal regulators also released their bi-national work plans that cover regulatory sectors such as health products, food safety, transportation safety, aquaculture, work place safety and environmental initiatives.

June 2015 – Under the Office of Information and Regulatory Affairs, the Regulatory Working Group releases guidelines in support of Executive Order 13609, "Promoting International Regulatory Cooperation".

== See also ==
- Canada–United States relations
- North American Free Trade Agreement
- North American Plant Protection Organization
- North American Union
- North American Competitiveness Council

Related infrastructure projects:
