= United States of North America =

United States of North America may refer to:

- an obsolete name of the United States
- a fictional country in the 1966 novel Colossus (novel)
- a fictional country in the 1985 computer game A Mind Forever Voyaging
- a fictional country in the 2010 series "Star Carrier" by William H. Keith Jr.
- a fictional country in the 2014 web novel series The Irregular at Magic High School

== See also ==
- North American Union, theoretical economic and political continental union of Canada, Mexico and the United States
- American (word)
- Abel Buell, publisher of A New and Correct Map of the United States of North America, 1783
