= Robert Pastor =

American writer and academic

- Born: Robert Alan Pastor; April 10, 1947; Newark, New Jersey
- Died: January 8, 2014 (aged 66); Washington, D.C.
- Education: Lafayette College, John F. Kennedy School of Government, Harvard University
- Occupations: writer, member of the United States National Security Council staff

Robert Alan Pastor (April 10, 1947 – January 8, 2014) was a member of the National Security Council staff and a writer on foreign affairs.

== Education ==
Pastor earned his bachelor's degree in history from Lafayette College and a Masters of Public Administration and Policy (MPA), with a concentration in International Economics from the John F. Kennedy School of Government at Harvard University. He also held a PhD in from Harvard University. He served in the US Peace Corps in Malaysia where he learned Malay/Indonesian. He also was a Fulbright Professor at El Colegio de México in Mexico where he taught courses on U.S. Foreign Policy.

== Personal life ==
Pastor was married to the former Margaret McNamara, daughter of former Secretary of Defense Robert McNamara, with whom he had two children. He lived in Washington, D.C. He died of colon cancer in 2014.

== Work history ==
Pastor was a member of the National Security Council Staff with a portfolio that included Latin America and the Caribbean during the administration of President Jimmy Carter from 1977 to 1981.

Pastor was nominated by President Bill Clinton in 1994 to serve as the Ambassador to Panama. The Senate Foreign Relations Committee approved his nomination by a vote of 16–3, but Senator Jesse Helms prevented the full Senate from voting. After the Republicans won control of the Senate in November 1994, Helms became chairman of the committee and refused to permit a vote on Pastor, who then requested for Clinton to withdraw his nomination. The main reason that Helms opposed the nomination was that he held Pastor accountable for negotiating the Panama Canal Treaties.

He served as a Senior Fellow at the Carter Center, where he established the programs on Latin America and the Caribbean, democracy and election-monitoring, and Chinese village elections. He was also Goodrich C. White Professor of Political Science at Emory University.

Pastor was Vice President of International Affairs at American University in Washington, D.C. from September 2002-December 2007. There, he helped establish the American University of Nigeria, transformed and expanded the study abroad program and introduced the "Abroad at AU" program, bringing students from around the world to study for a semester or year at AU. He also founded and headed the university's Center for Democracy and Election Management, and the Center for North American Studies and was executive director of the Carter-Baker Commission on Federal Election Reform. In 2003, Pastor was elected to the Common Cause National Governing Board.

Pastor was Vice Chair of the Independent Task Force on the Future of North America, sponsored by the Council on Foreign Relations in association with the Mexican Council on Foreign Relations (Consejo Mexicano de Asuntos Internacionales) and the Canadian Council of Chief Executives.

== North American Community ==
Pastor's advocacy of North American integration has been the subject of heated controversy, with criticisms from the left and the right. Pastor proposed a North American Community, "whose premise is that all three sovereign countries benefit when each of the countries makes progress, and all suffer when one fails".

Pastor is featured in the 2010 Canadian documentary film Water On The Table, in which he refers to the North American Free Trade Agreement (NAFTA) and debates water rights issues.

== Published works ==
He is well-published on US foreign policy, having written or edited 17 books, including "The North American Idea: A Vision of a Continental Future,"Exiting the Whirlpool: US Foreign Policy Toward Latin America and the Caribbean, Democracy in the Caribbean: Political, Economic and Social Perspectives and Limits to Friendship: The United States and Mexico.

Pastor has published extensively his theories of a North American Community, including Toward a North American Community: Lessons from the Old World to the New.

Through the Independent Task Force on North America he has released the reports Building a North American Community and "Creating a North American Community", both released in 2005.

== See also ==
- North American Community of Nations
- Operation Charly
