= North American Union =

Theoretical Canada-Mexico-US union

Map showing the theoretical union located in the world map

The North American Union (NAU) is a theoretical economic and political continental union of Canada, Mexico and the United States, the three largest and most populous countries in North America. The concept is loosely based on the European Union, occasionally including a common currency called the amero or the North American Dollar. A union of the North American continent, sometimes extending to Central and South America, has been the subject of academic concepts for over a century, as well as becoming a common trope in science fiction. One reason for the difficulty in realizing the concept is that individual developments in each region have failed to prioritize a larger union. Some form of union has been discussed or proposed in academic, business, and political circles for decades. However, government officials from all three nations say there are no plans to create a North American Union and that no agreement to do so has been proposed, much less signed. The formation of a North American Union has been the subject of various conspiracy theories.

== History ==
Since at least the mid-19th century, numerous concepts for a union among Canada, Mexico and the United States, some including the Caribbean, the Central American and the South American countries, have been proposed, such as the North American Technate. Following the Maastricht Treaty and the North American Free Trade Agreement (NAFTA) going into effect in the early to mid-1990s, there was speculation about the formation of a North American Union, similar to the European Union created by Maastricht, being a possible future step for the region. Several proposals for continental integration of North America advocated the creation of a union styled after the European Union, though many academic and business groups advocated less dramatic changes involving the formation of a customs union or common market.

While serving as a policy adviser to the presidential campaign of Vicente Fox during the 2000 general election in Mexico, Jorge Castañeda, influenced by American academic Robert Pastor's ideas on deepening integration of NAFTA, encouraged Fox to include policies on integration as part of his campaign. Before and after the election Fox made appearances on several U.S. news programs advocating greater integration including a plan to open up the U.S.-Mexico border within ten years. Some in the United States saw this proposal for open borders as a call for or inevitable step towards a "North American Union" and received it with a mixture of praise and criticism, with critics like Pat Buchanan suggesting it would mean an end to U.S. sovereignty.

During an interview for Commanding Heights: The Battle for the World Economy in 2001, after he was elected president, Fox said that he sought with the United States a "convergence of our two economies, convergence on the basic and fundamental variables of the economy, convergence on rates of interest, convergence on income of people, convergence on salaries." He suggested this might take as long as 20 years to be realized, but the ultimate "convergence" he saw between the United States and Mexico would allow them to "erase that border, open up that border for [the] free flow of products, merchandises, [and] capital as well as people". Fox cited the success he claimed countries Republic of Ireland and Spain had in modernizing their economies and raising the standard of living for their citizens by joining what is now the European Union. Vicente Fox also proposed a plan to U.S. President George W. Bush and Canadian Prime Minister Jean Chrétien that he said would move the North American continent towards an economic union based on the example of the European Union. Fox's proposal was rejected by President Bush, with Fox later alleging in his book Revolution of Hope that the White House wanted him to "stop raising hackles" by talking about a North American Union.

Later, amid a push for greater integration and concerns about the impact of heightened security on trade relations following the September 11 attacks in 2001, an effort was organized in 2003 by the Canadian Council of Chief Executives, U.S. Council on Foreign Relations, and the Mexican Council on Foreign Relations called the Independent Task Force on North America. Several weeks before a meeting of North American leaders on March 23, 2005, the Task Force issued a press release and a statement from the Task Force's chairmen calling for deeper integration of NAFTA to form a North American Economic and Security Community by 2010.

A January 2005 leaked diplomatic cable includes discussion by U.S. government officials about the best approach to North American integration based on an assessment of Canadian views. The National Post's Robert Hiltz described the cable in June 2011 as discussing "the obstacles surrounding the merger of the economies of Canada, the United States and Mexico in a fashion similar to the European Union."

Two months later at the March meeting of North American leaders, the Security and Prosperity Partnership of North America (SPP) was formed. It was described by the leaders of Canada, Mexico and the United States as a dialogue to provide greater cooperation on security and economic issues. In response to later concerns, a section was put up on the initiative's site clarifying the SPP was not a legal agreement, that the initiative "does not seek to rewrite or renegotiate NAFTA", and that the partnership itself "creates no NAFTA-plus legal status." A number of academics and government officials at the time viewed the SPP as moving North America towards greater integration.

In May 2005, the Task Force published a report praising the SPP initiative and pushing for greater economic integration by 2010. They repeated their call for the "establishment by 2010 of a North American economic and security community, the boundaries of which would be defined by a common external tariff and an outer security perimeter." In the report the Task Force said that a North American Community, which would be similar to the European Community which preceded the EU, should not rely on "grand schemes of confederation or union" and did not suggest a supranational government or a common currency. The Task Force's recommendations included developing a North American common market and security perimeter, among other common goals.

The SPP initiative was officially ended in August 2009 though the North American Leaders' Summit and most of the working groups set up under the initiative remain active. Several advocates of integration saw the SPP as being insufficient. One criticism was that the governments lacked a "vision of what North America might become" and as such did not provide the proper context that would allow the initiative to deal with barriers to deeper integration.

== Claims of implementation ==
In 2005, claims emerged from critics of North American integration that a "North American Union" was not only being planned, but was being implemented by the governments of Canada, Mexico, and the United States. These critics cited the formation of the Security and Prosperity Partnership of North America and claimed it was an attempt to dramatically alter the economic and political status quo between the countries outside of the scrutiny of the respective national legislatures, a critique heightened by the subsequent publication of the Independent Task Force on North America report which praised the SPP initiative and called for greater economic integration by 2010.

While a broad spectrum of observers criticized the secrecy of the SPP and its dominance by business groups, the specific claim that its true aim was to expand NAFTA into a North American Union analogous to the European Union (EU), with open borders and a common currency, among other features, was being made by the fall of 2006, when conservative commentators Phyllis Schlafly, Jerome Corsi, and Howard Phillips started a website dedicated to quashing what they perceived as the coming North American "Socialist mega-state".

The belief that a North American Union was being planned and implemented in secret became widespread, so much so that the NAU was a topic of debate during the 2008 U.S. presidential election campaigns and the subject of various U.S. Congress resolutions designed to thwart its implementation. Prominent critics such as Lou Dobbs, then an employee of CNN, and Republican presidential candidate Ron Paul denounced the concept, joined by left-wing nationalist groups in Canada, Internet blogs, and widely viewed videos and films such as "Zeitgeist" (2007). Corsi's book The Late Great USA: The Coming Merger with Mexico and Canada (2007) also helped bring the NAU discussion into the mainstream. These beliefs are the latest example of a long line of erroneous conspiracy theories which suggest that the United States' sovereignty is being eroded by a cabal of foreign and domestic players.

Phyllis Schlafly claimed the actual goals of the SPP were confirmed by the Task Force, and by the Task Force's co-chair American University professor Robert Pastor. Critics often cite Pastor as being the "father" of the NAU. His book Towards a North American Community: Lessons from the Old World for the New (2001) has been called a blueprint for the plan, and it includes a suggestion to adopt a common North American currency called the amero.

== Features ==
Administrative divisions within North America

Concepts of a North American Union share a number of common elements between them. NASCO and the SPP have both denied that there are any plans to establish a common currency, a "NAFTA Superhighway", or a North American Union in "Myths vs Facts" pages on their websites.

=== Amero ===
The "amero" is the appellation given to what would be the North American Union's counterpart to the euro. It was first proposed in 1999 by Canadian economist Herbert G. Grubel. A senior fellow of the Fraser Institute think-tank, he published a book entitled The Case for the Amero in September 1999, the year that the euro became a virtual currency. Robert Pastor, vice-chairman of the Independent Task Force on North America, supported Grubel's conclusions in his 2001 book Toward a North American Community, stating that: "In the long term, the amero is in the best interests of all three countries." Another Canadian think-tank, the conservative C.D. Howe Institute, advocates the creation of a shared currency between Canada and the United States. Although then-Mexican President Vicente Fox had expressed support for the idea, when Grubel brought up the idea to American officials, they said they were not interested, citing lack of benefits for the U.S.

One economic analysis has concluded that cross-border trade costs are likened to that of a tariff roughly equivalent to 170%. Forty-four percent of that "tariff" is attributed to "border related trade barriers" which breaks down as follows, "a 8% policy barrier, a 7% language barrier, a 14% currency barrier (from the use of different currencies), a 6% information cost barrier, and a 3% security barrier." On August 31, 2007, Internet broadcaster and conspiracy theorists Hal Turner and Ace Sabau claimed to have arranged for a United States government minted amero coin to be smuggled out of the U.S. Treasury Department by an employee of that organization. Snopes has assessed both Turner's story and the existence of the amero as false.

=== NAFTA superhighway ===
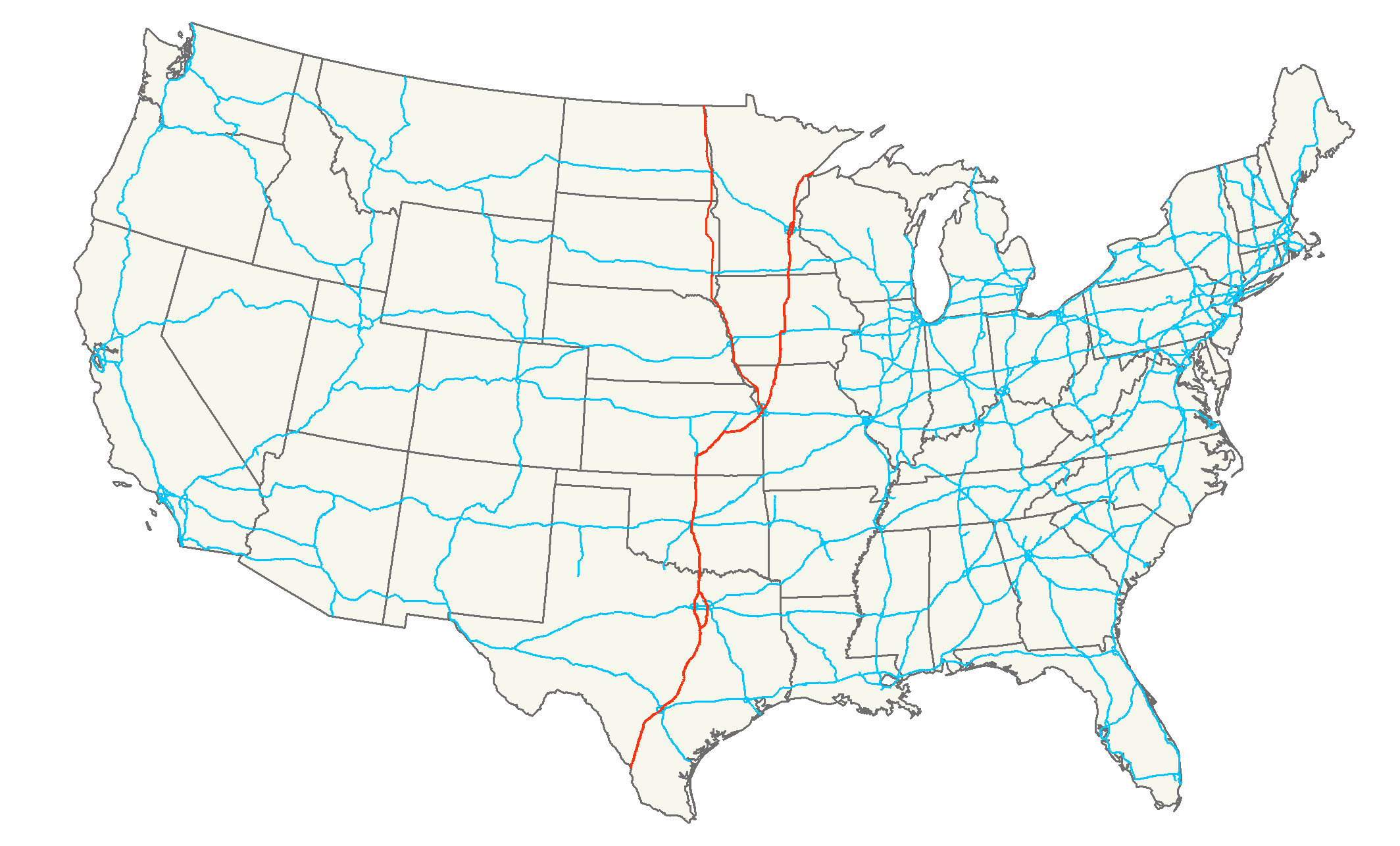
Interstate 29 and Interstate 35

The Trans-Texas Corridor was first proposed by Texas Governor Rick Perry in 2002. It consists of a 1,200 foot (366 m) wide highway that also carries utilities such as electricity, petroleum, and water, as well as railway track and fiber-optic cables. In July 2007, U.S. Representative and candidate for the Republican nomination in the 2008 presidential election Duncan Hunter successfully offered an amendment to H.R. 3074, the Department of Transportation Appropriations Act, 2008, prohibiting the use of federal funds for U.S. Department of Transportation participation in the activities of the Security and Prosperity Partnership of North America (SPP). Hunter stated that:

Unfortunately, very little is known about the NAFTA Super Highway. This amendment will provide Congress the opportunity to exercise oversight of the highway, which remains a subject of question and uncertainty, and ensure that our safety and security will not be compromised in order to promote the business interests of our neighbors

The Ministry of Transportation for the province of Alberta displayed a diagram on their website that labelled I-29 and I-35 as "NAFTA superhighway".

In 2011, the Texas Legislature repealed its authorization for the establishment and operation of the Trans-Texas Corridor.

== Official statements ==
In 2001, President of Mexico Vicente Fox said in an interview for Commanding Heights: The Battle for the World Economy that in the long term he sought with the United States a "convergence of our two economies, convergence on the basic and fundamental variables of the economy, convergence on rates of interest, convergence on income of people, convergence on salaries." He suggested this might take as long as 20 years to be realized, but the ultimate "convergence" he saw between the United States and Mexico would allow them to "erase that border, open up that border for [the] free flow of products, merchandises, [and] capital as well as people". After leaving office, he continued to support the concept, while expressing his disappointment with the changed American political situation which made it seem more difficult to come to fruition. In an online discussion of his book Revolution of Hope: The Life, Faith, and Dreams of A Mexican President Fox cited the process of European integration and asked a question, "Why can't we be not only partners in the long term, but a North American Union?"

In September 2006, U.S. Representative Virgil Goode proposed with six co-sponsors non-binding House Concurrent Resolution 487, which specifically outlined opposition to a North American Union or a NAFTA Superhighway as a threat to U.S. sovereignty. The bill never left committee. The same resolution was reintroduced by Goode in January 2007 for the 110th Congress as House Concurrent Resolution 40, this time with forty-three cosponsors, including 2008 Republican presidential candidates Duncan Hunter, Ron Paul and Tom Tancredo, who all expressed opposition to a North American Union during their campaigns.

U.S. Commerce Secretary Carlos Gutierrez stated in 2007: "There is no secret plan to create a North American union, or a common currency, or to intrude on the sovereignty of any of the partner nations".

Regarding the NAFTA superhighway, officials from the Federal Highway Administration have denied such a scheme. Also, the NASCO denies a new proposal for a "NAFTA superhighway" saying, "it exists today as I-35."

In an August 2007 press conference in Montebello, Quebec, Canadian Prime Minister Stephen Harper stated that he didn't believe that the NAU was a "generally expressed concern", while U.S. President George W. Bush called concerns of a North American Union "political scare tactics" and described as "comical" the "difference between reality and what some people are talking on TV about."

== See also ==
- United States of North America
- African Union
- American expansionism under Donald Trump (Donroe Doctrine)
- Ameripol
- Canada–United States relations
- Mexico–United States relations
- Canada–Mexico relations
- European Union
- Movements for the annexation of Canada to the United States
- North American Leaders' Summit
- North American Competitiveness Council
- North American monetary union (amero)
- North American Forum on Integration
- North American SuperCorridor Coalition
- Security and Prosperity Partnership of North America
- Organization of American States
