= Digital Government Society =

- Formation: 2005; 21 years ago
- Type: 501(c)(3) not-for-profit membership corporation
- Headquarters: Los Angeles; California
- Method: conferences, publications, mentoring, education, training, consulting
- President: Jing Zhang (2024-)
- Website: dgsociety.org

The Digital Government Society or DGS is an international, nonprofit, professional society devoted to advancing democratic digital government via research, policy, and best practice, including original countries, Canada, the United States, and Mexico, and other countries around the world.

== History and purpose ==
The organization was founded in 2005 as the Digital Government Society of North America, registered in the State of California, as a charitable organization. It was renamed "The Digital Government Society (DGS)" on October 11, 2013. It grew out of the US National Science Foundation's CISE-based Digital Government program. The founding members include Yigal Arens at USI/Information Sciences Institute, Eduard Hovy at Carnegie Mellon University (at USI/Information Sciences Institute formerly), Sharon Dawes at University at Albany, Larry Brandt at the National Science Foundation, and Valerie Gregg, also at the National Science foundation.

The National Science Foundation formed a partnership known as "dg.o" (DigitalGovernment.Org), for the advancement of digital government. It brings together computer science researchers with federal, state and local agencies to improve the quality and scope of on-line government services. Larry Brandt, NSF program director, stated "With the dg.o, the next steps are to build a multi-sector research-based community of many universities and government agencies." NSF-funded digital government activities include:

- improving citizen access to government statistical data
- managing information and knowledge for law enforcement
- implementing a testbed of high-speed communications for comprehensive emergency management
- ensuring security for web-based statistical analysis of confidential data

The dg.o consortium is expected to support participating research institutions and the digital government community by giving academic researchers insight into federal agency needs, transferring emergent information technology from academia to member agencies, acting as an information source across agencies and helping to leverage resources through collaboration.

== Board of directors ==
The society's activities are conducted and overseen by the board of directors. The board consists of the executive board members that includes president, president elect, treasurer, secretary, and immediate past president, and other board members. The board of directors are elected for a two-year term through nominations and member votes every two years, starting in January of the first year ending in December of the second year. The election is usually held in late November or early December of the second year of the two-year term.

The current and past president of the Digital Government Society include:

- Jing Zhang (2024-2025)
- Marijn Janssen (2022-2023)
- Luis Felipe Luna-Reyes (2020-2021)
- Sehl Mellouli (2018-2019)
- Soon Ae Chun (2016-2017)
- Theresa Pardo (2014-2015)
- John Bertot (2012-2013)
- Jochen Scholl (2010-2011)
- Eduard Hovy (2008-2009)
- Sharon Dawes (2006-2007).

The past board members are listed here.

The current board members from 24-25 are listed here.

The board members are responsible for holding monthly meetings to discuss all aspects of the DGS activities and the community building efforts. The DGS operates with the standing committees, including membership committee, annual conference organization committee, award committee, liaison committee, communications committee, etc. as well as ad-hoc committees. Each committee consists of a committee chair and several volunteer committee members.

== Activities ==
Every year, the DGS hosts "dg.o conference", the International Conference on Digital Government Research, which is a premier venue for the digital government research community. Current and previous conferences include:

- dg.o 2024, In-person Conference, Taipei, Taiwan
- dg.o 2023, In-person Conference, Gdańsk, Poland, 2023
- dg.o 2022, Virtual Conference, 2022
- dg.o 2021, Virtual Conference, University of Nebraska, Omaha, 2021
- dg.o 2020, Virtual Conference due to COVID19 pandemic, Seoul National University, S. Korea.
- dg.o 2019, Mohammed Bin Rashid School of Government, UAE, 2019
- dg.o 2018, Delft University of Technology, The Netherlands, 2018
- dg.o 2017, City University of New York, College of Staten Island, New York, NY on June 7–9, 2017
- dg.o 2016, Shanghai, China, in June 2016
- dg.o 2015, Arizona State University, Phoenix, AZ on May 27–30, 2015.
- past dg.o conferences

The DGS also makes efforts to the global reach, including EU academic activities (e.g. IFIP 8.5 Working Group E-gov and E-Part), and a collaboration with China.
