= Border Environment Cooperation Commission =

Coordinates: 31.717923°N 106.396495°W

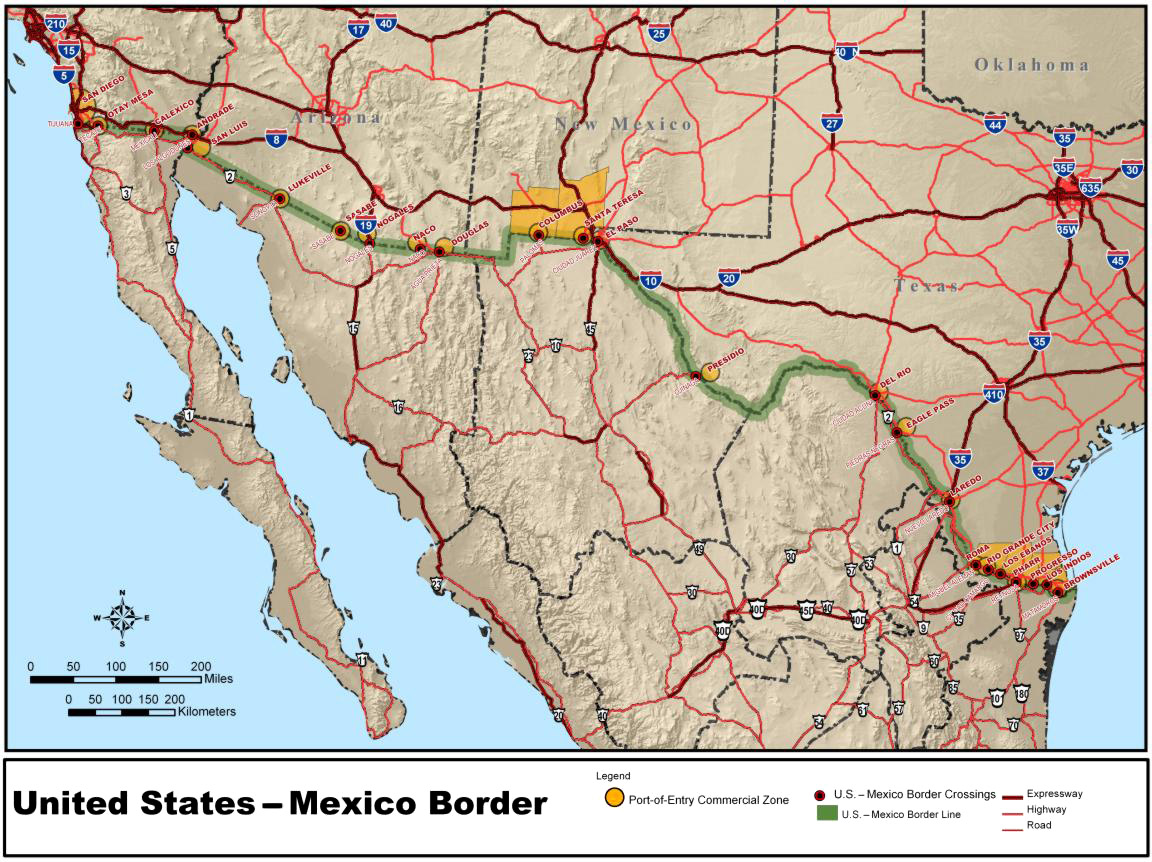
United States–Mexico border map

The Border Environment Cooperation Commission (BECC) headquartered in Ciudad Juarez, Chihuahua, Mexico, is a binational organization created in 1994 by the Federal Governments of the United States of America and Mexico under a side-agreement to the North American Free Trade Agreement (NAFTA). BECC along with its sister-institution the North American Development Bank (NADB), established by the same agreement and headquartered in San Antonio, Texas, USA, are charged with helping to improve the environmental conditions of the Mexico–United States border region in order to advance the well-being of residents in both nations. The scope of their mandate and the specific functions of each institution are defined in the agreement between the two governments (the "Charter"), as amended in August 2004.

== History ==
The BECC (and the NADB) were established by the Border Environment Cooperation Agreement of November 1993 (Agreement Between the Government of the United States of America and the Government of the United Mexican States Concerning the Establishment of a Border Environment Cooperation Commission and a North American Development Bank.)

== Merger with NADB ==
In 2017, BECC announced its merger with the North American Development Bank (NADB).
