= North American Leaders' Summit =

Meetings of the US, Canada and Mexico leaders

- Participants: Prime Minister of Canada; President of Mexico; President of the United States

The North American Leaders' Summit (NALS), called the Three Amigos Summit in the English language popular press, Cumbre de los tres amigos in Spanish and Sommet des trois amigos in French, is the trilateral summit between the prime minister of Canada, the president of Mexico, and the president of the United States. The summits were initially held as part of the Security and Prosperity Partnership of North America (SPP), a continent-level dialogue between the three countries established in 2005, and continued after SPP became inactive in 2009.

The most recent North American Leaders' Summit was hosted by Mexican president Andrés Manuel López Obrador on January 10, 2023 in Mexico City.

== Meetings ==
Until 2009, the summits were held as part of the wider Security and Prosperity Partnership of North America. There are no fixed dates for the summits and in some years a summit has not been held for varying reasons. In 2011, the summit was postponed out of respect for the bereavement of the Mexican government after the death of Mexican Interior Minister Francisco Blake Mora, and in 2015, Prime Minister of Canada Stephen Harper cancelled the Three Amigos summit as a political statement to protest U.S. President Barack Obama's push against the Keystone XL oil pipeline.

During the first administration of Donald Trump from 2017 to 2021, no official summits were held. The leaders of the three countries continued to meet at other events, such as the signing of the United States–Mexico–Canada Agreement during the 2018 G20 Buenos Aires summit.

During the second administration of Donald Trump, since 2025, there are no official summits planned to be held. The leaders of the three countries are involved with the 2025–2026 United States trade wars with Canada and Mexico. The three leaders briefly met trilaterally during the 2026 FIFA World Cup draw at the Kennedy Center in Washington, D.C. on Friday, December 5, 2025.

No.	Year	Dates	Location	Host leader	Guest leaders
1	2005	March 23	(United States) Waco, Texas	George W. Bush	(Mexico) Vicente Fox (Canada) Paul Martin
2	2006	March 31	(Mexico) Cancún, Quintana Roo	Vicente Fox	(United States) George W. Bush (Canada) Stephen Harper
3	2007	August 20–21	(Canada) Montebello, Quebec	Stephen Harper	(United States) George W. Bush (Mexico) Felipe Calderón
4	2008	April 21–22	(United States) New Orleans, Louisiana	George W. Bush	(Mexico) Felipe Calderón (Canada) Stephen Harper
5	2009	August 8–11	(Mexico) Guadalajara, Jalisco	Felipe Calderón	(Canada) Stephen Harper (United States) Barack Obama
6	2012	April 2	(United States) Washington, D.C.	Barack Obama	(Mexico) Felipe Calderón (Canada) Stephen Harper
7	2014	February 19	Toluca, State of Mexico	Enrique Peña Nieto	(Canada) Stephen Harper (United States) Barack Obama
8	2016	June 29	(Canada) Ottawa, Ontario	Justin Trudeau	(United States) Barack Obama (Mexico) Enrique Peña Nieto
9	2021	November 18	(United States) Washington, D.C.	Joe Biden	(Canada) Justin Trudeau (Mexico) Andrés Manuel López Obrador
10	2023	January 10	Mexico City	Andrés Manuel López Obrador	(Canada) Justin Trudeau (United States) Joe Biden

== Photo gallery ==
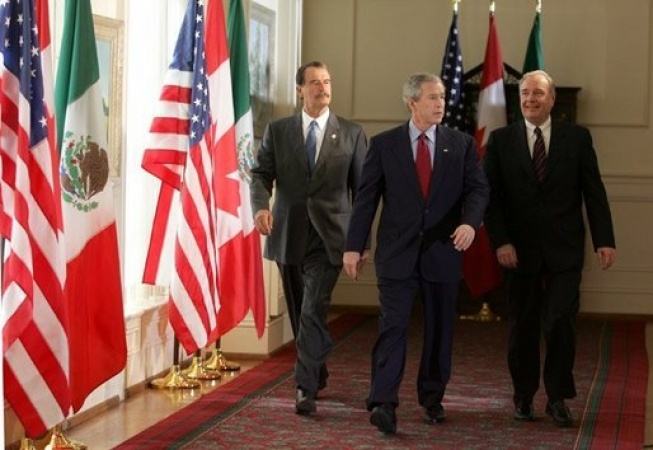
I Summit of Leaders of America (2005).

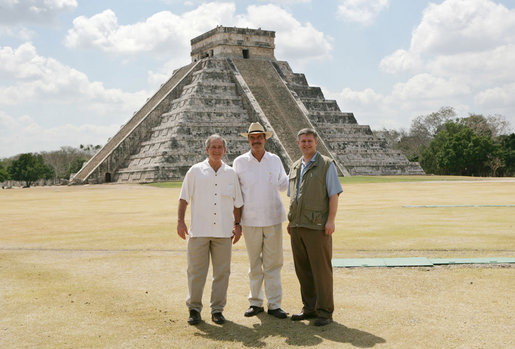
II Summit of Leaders of America (2006).

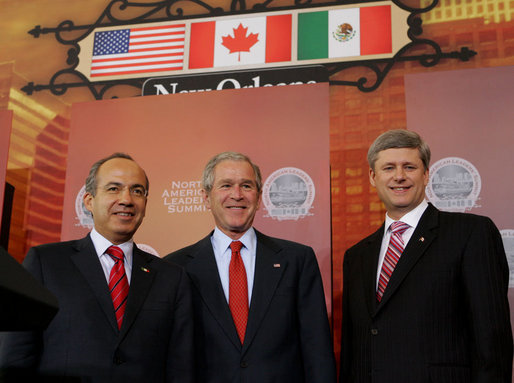
IV Summit of Leaders of America (2008).

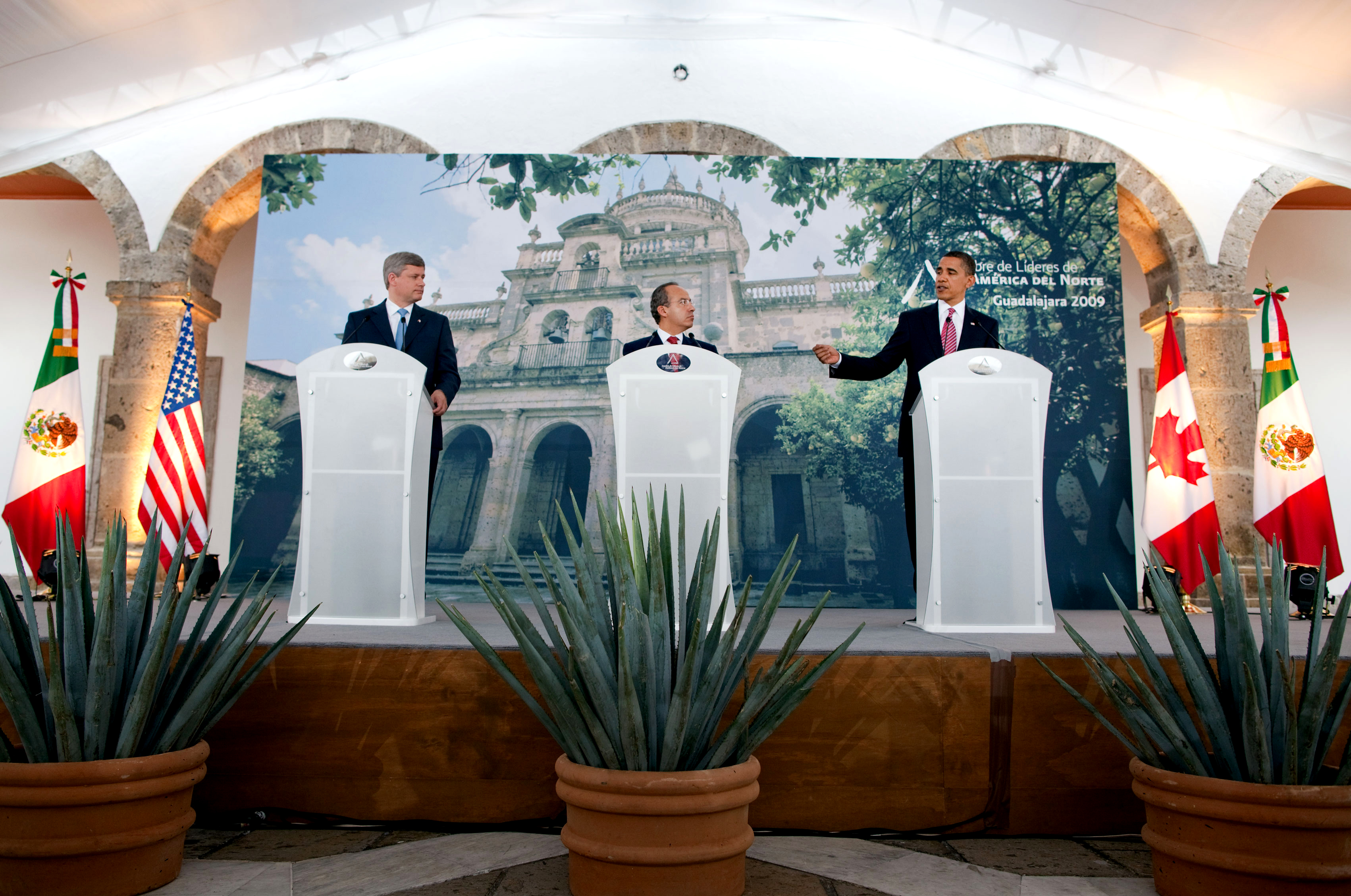
V Summit of Leaders of America (2009).

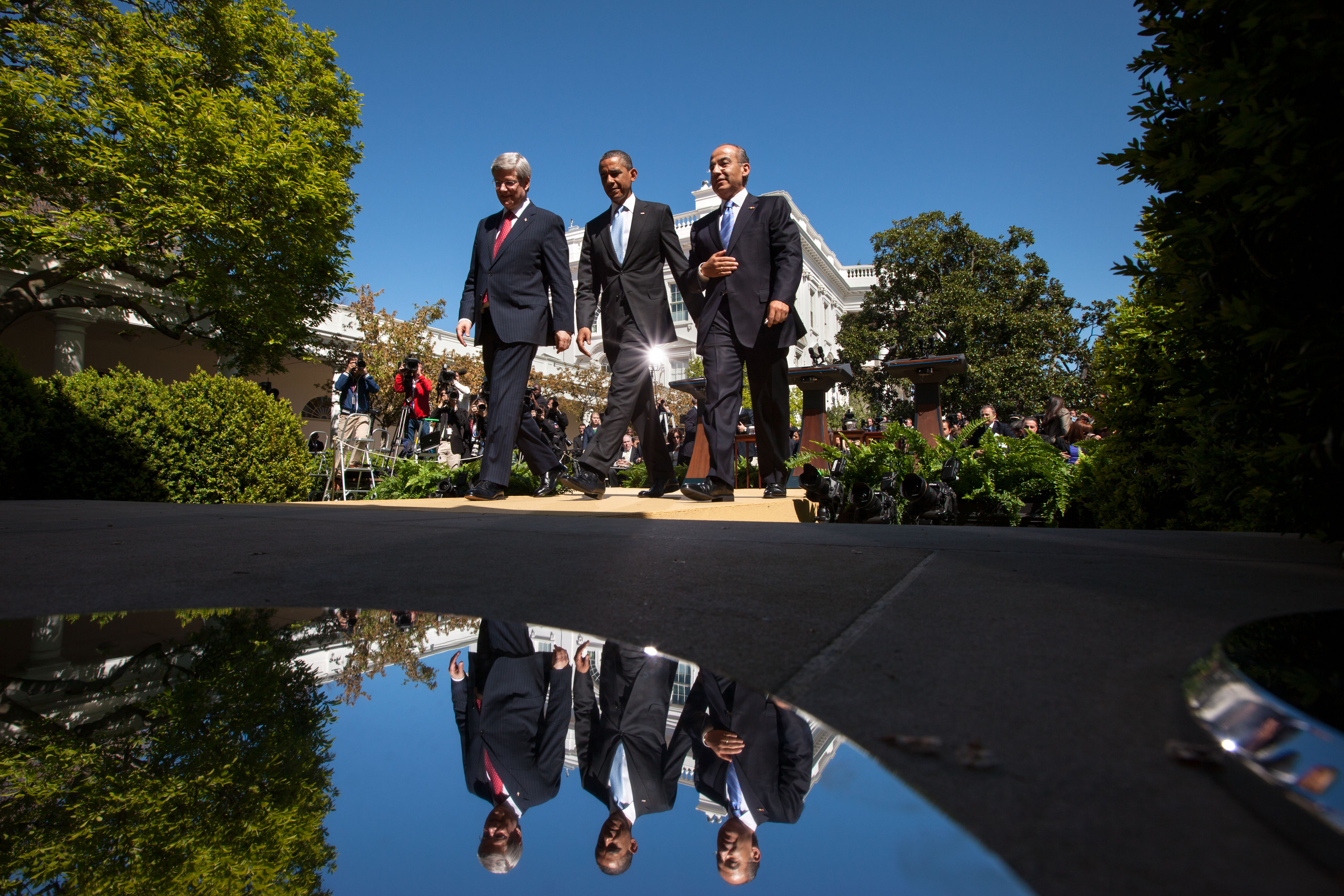
VI Summit of Leaders of America (2012).

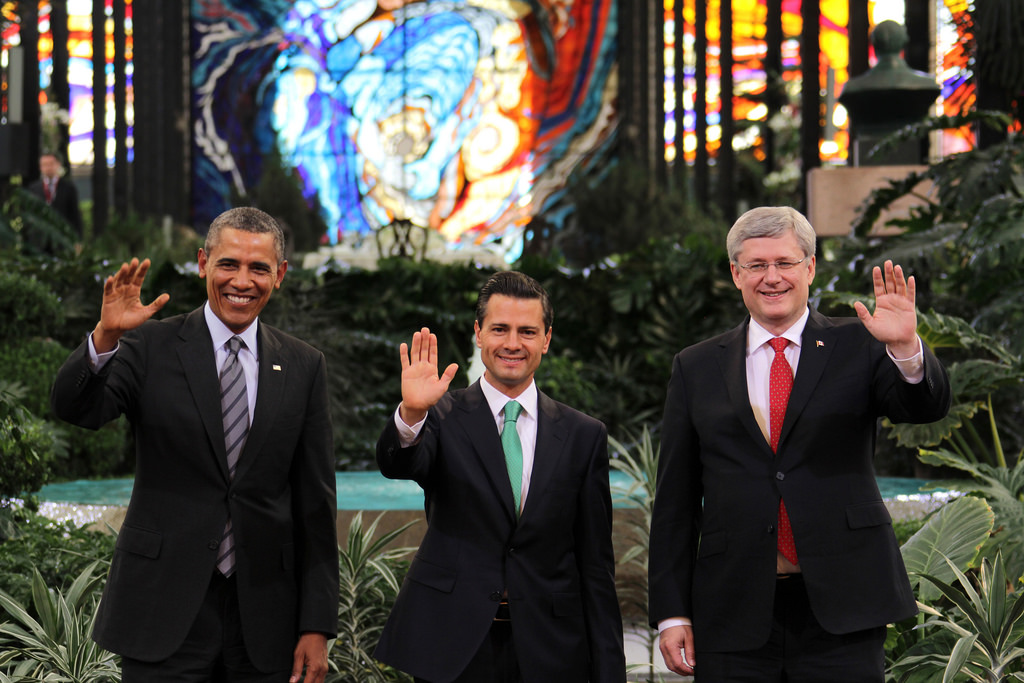
VII Summit of Leaders of America (2014).

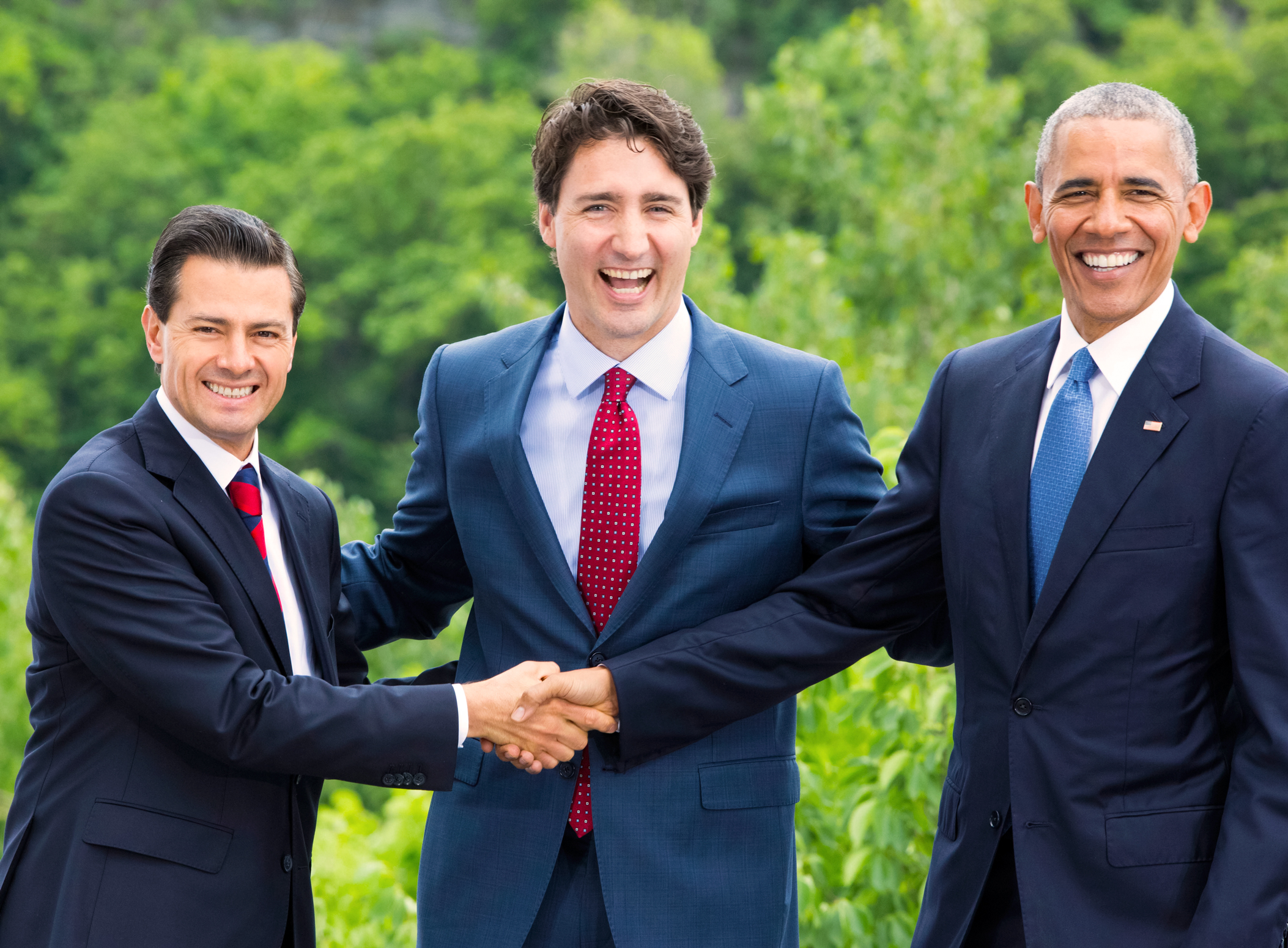
VIII Summit of Leaders of America (2016).

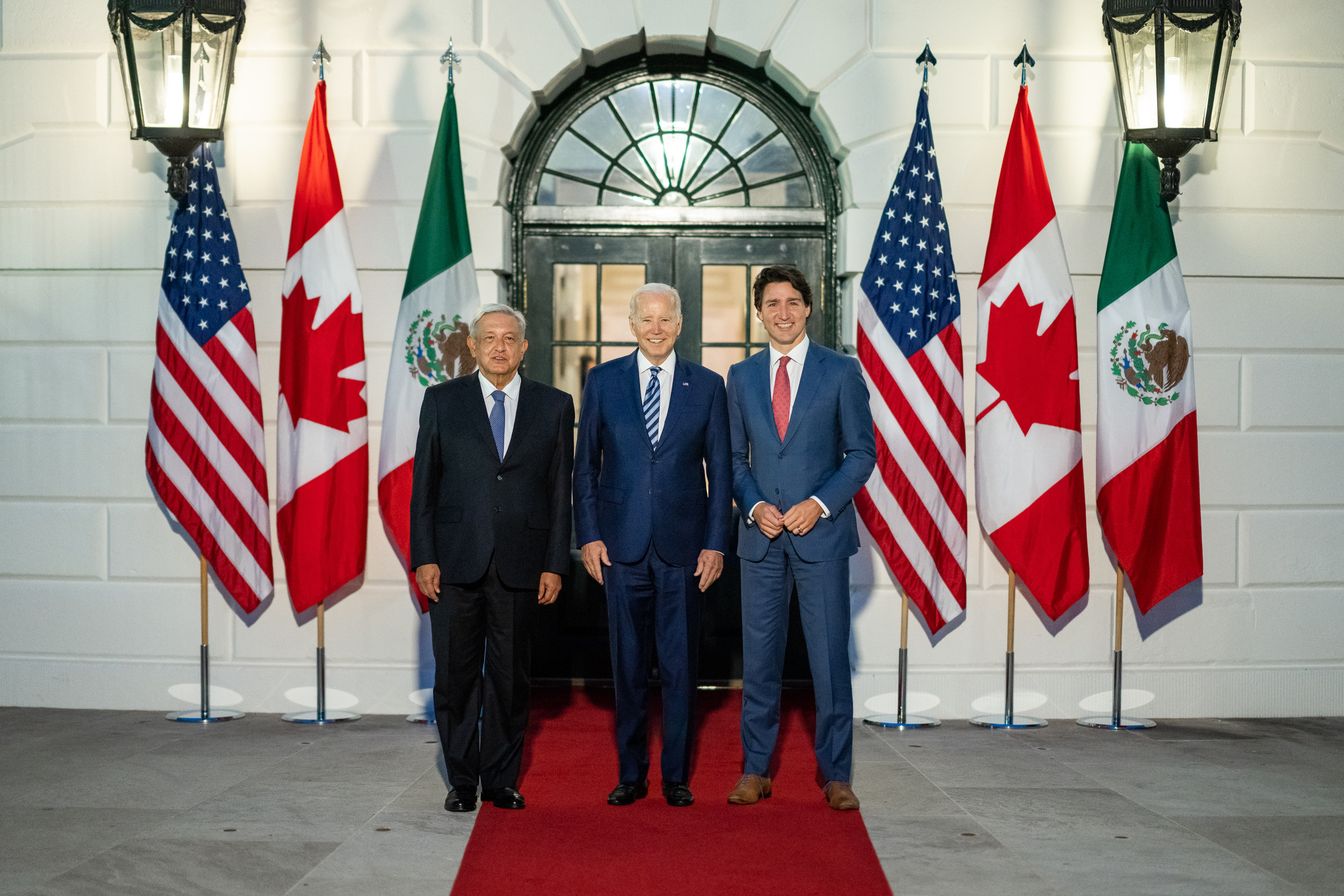
IX Summit of Leaders of America (2021).

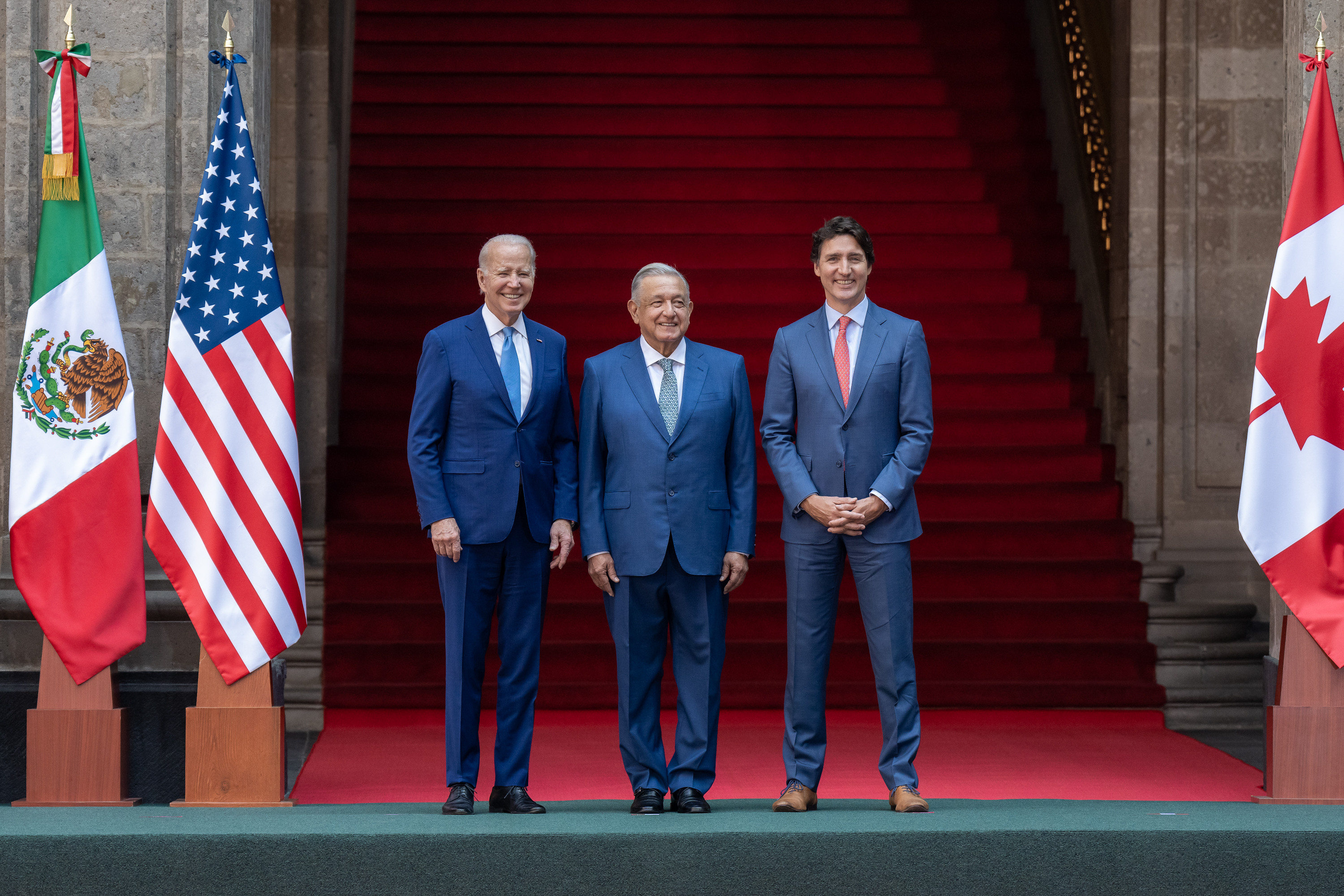
X Summit of Leaders of America (2023).

== See also ==
Bilateral relations

- Canada–United States relations
- Mexico–United States relations
- Canada–Mexico relations

Trilateral relations

- United States–Mexico–Canada Agreement, and its predecessor the North American Free Trade Agreement
- North American Agreement on Environmental Cooperation
- Security and Prosperity Partnership of North America, predecessor to NALS
- North American Union, a theoretical economic and political union of the three countries
