= North American Development Bank =

Binational financial institution supporting infrastructure development

Logo of the North American Development Bank, from its Twitter page

The North American Development Bank (NADBank) is a binational financial institution capitalized and governed equally by the Federal Governments of the United States of America and Mexico to provide financing to support the development and implementation of infrastructure projects. In 2013, the banking institution was integrated into the U.S.--Mexico High Level Economic Dialogue in terms of making effective use of it in terms of fostering economic growth, productivity, entrepreneurship, and innovation between Mexico and the United States. In 2017, the North American Development Bank merged with the Border Environment Cooperation Commission.

== History ==
The NADBank was established by the Border Environment Cooperation Agreement of November 1993 (Agreement Between the Government of the United States of America and the Government of the United Mexican States Concerning the Establishment of a Border Environment Cooperation Commission and a North American Development Bank.)

In the United States, participation by the government was authorized by North American Free Trade Agreement Implementation Act § 541 (22 U.S.C. § 290m).

== Infrastructure financing ==
Infrastructure financing from the bank consists of the following:

- Loan Program
- Community Assistance Program
- Border Environment Infrastructure Fund (BEIF)

== Technical Assistance ==
=== Technical Assistance Program (TAP) ===
The NADB provides technical assistance by providing technical studies, forums, and training programs under the following classifications:

- Project development
- Sector Studies
- Capacity Building

=== Project Development Assistance Program (PDAP) ===
Projects selected to receive a BEIF grant are also eligible to receive technical assistance through PDAP to support development activities aimed at facilitating their successful implementation and reinforcing their long-term sustainability and proper operation.

=== Border 2025: U.S.-Mexico Environmental Program ===
The Border 2025 Program is an environmental program implemented under or build upon the following agreements:

- The 1983 La Paz Agreement
- The Border 2012 Environmental Program
- The Border 2020 Environmental Program

The U.S.-Mexico Environmental Program encourages meaningful participation from communities and local stakeholders.

== Merger with BECC ==
In 2017, NADB announced its merger with the Border Environment Cooperation Commission (BECC). As stated by Carlos Márquez-Padilla Casar, Head of International Finance at Mexico’s Ministry of Finance (Secretaría de Hacienda y Crédito Público or SHCP) and Board chair for 2017:

This merger defines a new era for the institution that maintains its mission of helping to preserve and protect human health and environmental conditions for the communities in the border region. In addition, this merger ensures that the Bank’s functions and operations continue to be strengthened to serve border needs more effectively.
