= U.S.–Mexico High-Level Economic Dialogue =

The U.S.-Mexico High-Level Economic Dialogue (HLED) is a bilateral commercial and economic dialogue between the United States and Mexico, of which the formation of the dialogue was announced by U.S. President Barack Obama and Mexican President Peña Nieto in May of 2013.

== Pillars of the dialogues ==
The original dialogue (2013) was built on the following pillars:

- Promoting Competitiveness and Connectivity
  - Transportation
  - Telecommunications
- Fostering Economic Growth, Productivity, Entrepreneurship, and Innovation
  - Joint investment promotion
  - Economic development on the border and a Comprehensive Economic Development Strategy
  - Making effective use of the North American Development Bank (NADB)
  - Partnership on advanced manufacturing
  - Entrepreneurship
  - Workforce Development
- Partnering for Regional and Global Leadership
  - Partnering to promote development in Central America
  - Regional trade priorities
  - Transparency and anti-corruption

== Launch and subsequent meetings ==
In September of 2013, Vice President Joe Biden and the Mexican government, launched the HLED. The following year (2014), Commerce Secretary Penny Pritzker and Mexican Secretary of Economy Ildefonso Guajardo met for a midyear review of the project. Among the accomplishments at that point were:

- The signing of Americas Competitiveness Exchange on Innovation and Entrepreneurship: A program where businesses and government leaders toured technology centers, innovation hubs, and investment zones in the Southeast United States.
- Working group meetings on the Bilateral Forum for Education, Innovation, and Research (FOBESII): FOBESII was created with the goals of increasing educational and professional exchange programs, promoting joint science and technology research, and encouraging innovation.

The second meeting in 2015 established the goal of energy and climate cooperation as one of its goals.

Under the leadership of the U.S.-Mexico Entrepreneurship and Innovation Council (MUSEIC), the project had announced in 2016 that Mexico had developed its national cluster map for identifying investment and trade opportunities and design economic development strategies.

=== Relaunch ===
After the departure of the Trump Administration in 2021, the President Joe Biden and Mexican President Andrés Manuel López Obrador relaunched the program, with the following pillars:

- Building Back Together
- Promoting Sustainable Economic and Social Development in Southern Mexico and Central America
- Securing the Tools for Future Prosperity
- Investing in Our People

United States Trade Representative Katherine Tai made the following statement about the relaunch:

Investing in our people—and our workers especially—is one of our top priorities, and a critical aspect of the Biden-Harris Administration’s worker-centric economic policies. Thousands of people and vehicles cross our shared border every day, and the value of our bilateral trade in goods and services is more than $1.5 billion per day. However, our relationship is not purely economic. Our peoples have a shared history and culture, and the ties between our two countries go back centuries. That human connection reinforces and distinguishes our relationship – and maintaining these close ties depends on us investing in our people.

In the first year of the relaunch (2022), the following had occurred:

- “Sowing Opportunities” (Sembrando Oportunidades) was created to increase technical cooperation and address the root causes of irregular migration in Northern Central America (NCA). From this scenario, the Root Causes Strategy for the NCA region was also launched by the Biden-Harris Administration in 2021.
- The U.S. Agency for International Development (USAID) had launched a new economic development project called Southern Mexico Generating Employment and Sustainability (SURGES).

In 2023, the Mexican Agency for International Development Cooperation (AMEXCID) and the United States Agency for International Development (USAID) announced a program for economic development in the agricultural sector of Guatemala. In 2024, the two organizations concluded capacity training there for agribusiness, good agricultural practices, and regenerative agriculture.

== Organizational structure ==
The U.S. side of the HLEC was originally co-chaired by the U.S. Department of Commerce, the U.S. Department of State, and the Office of the U.S. Trade Representative. Participation includes the following:

- U.S. Departments of Agriculture
- U.S. Department of Energy
- U.S. Department of Homeland Security
- U.S. Department of Labor
- U.S. Department of Transportation
- U.S. Department of the Treasury
- U.S. Agency for International Development (USAID)

=== The Mexican side of HLEC was originally co-chaired by ===
- Secretariats of Economy
- Secretariat of Finance and Public Credit
- Secretariat of Foreign Affairs

Participation included the following:

- Secretariat of Agriculture and Rural Development
- Secretariat of Infrastructure, Communications, and Transportation
- Secretariat of Public Education
- Secretariat of Energy
- Secretariat of Tourism
