= Eduard Hovy =

Computational linguist at Carnegie Mellon University

- Born: Johannesburg
- Education: Yale University
- Known for: Natural Language Processing; Computational Linguistics
- Scientific career
- Workplaces: Carnegie Mellon University
- Website: www.cs.cmu.edu/~hovy/

Eduard Hovy is a Research Professor in the Language Technologies Institute at Carnegie Mellon University. He is one of the original 17 Fellows of the Association for Computational Linguistics.

== Biography ==
Eduard Hovy received M.S. (December 1982) and Ph.D. (May 1987) degrees in Computer Science from Yale University. He was awarded honorary doctorates from the National University of Distance Education (UNED) in Madrid in 2013 and the University of Antwerp in 2015.
