= North American Forum on Integration =

North American think tank

The North American Forum on Integration (NAFI), also known as Le Forum sur l'Intégration Nord-Américaine (FINA) or Foro sobre la Integración NorteAmericana (FINA), was a North American think tank based in Montreal, Quebec, that advocates closer ties between Canada, Mexico, and the United States, including a common currency and common EU style parliament.
