= Security and Prosperity Partnership of North America =

North American international organization

Security and Prosperity Partnership of North America Partenariat nord-américain pour la sécurité et la prospérité (French) Alianza para la Seguridad y la Prosperidad de América del Norte (Spanish)
- Logo

- Members of the Security and Prosperity Partnership of North America
- Membership: Canada; Mexico; United States

Leaders
  - Prime Minister of Canada: Stephen Harper (last)
  - President of Mexico: Felipe Calderón (last)
  - President of the United States: Barack Obama (last)
- Establishment: 2005
  - Waco Security and Prosperity Partnership Trilateral Summit: March 23, 2005
  - Cancellation: August 2009
| Succeeded by |
| North American Leaders' Summit |

The Security and Prosperity Partnership of North America (SPP) was a supra-national level dialogue with the stated purpose of providing greater cooperation on security and economic issues. The Partnership was founded in Waco, Texas, on March 23, 2005, by Prime Minister of Canada Paul Martin, President of Mexico Vicente Fox, and U.S. President George W. Bush. It was the second of such regional-level initiatives involving the United States following the 1997 Partnership for Prosperity and Security in the Caribbean (PPS).

Since August 2009, the SPP is no longer active. It has been largely superseded by the annual North American Leaders' Summit, an event that was established as part of the SPP.

== Organization ==
The SPP was neither a treaty nor a trade agreement.

The initial SPP Working Groups were the Manufactured Goods and Sectoral and Regional Competitiveness Working Group, E-Commerce & ICT Working Group, Energy Working Group, Transportation Working Group, Food & Agriculture Working Group, Environment Working Group, Financial Services Working Group, Business Facilitation Working Group, Movement of Goods Working Group, and Health Working Group. The Transportation Working Group was formed to analyze border trade and traffic flows. The U.S. Health and Human Services Office of the Assistant Secretary for Preparedness and Response (ASPR) led the SPP Health Working Group, in order to improve the ability of three countries to mutually assist each other during public health emergencies, to exchange information for policy planning, and to improve product safety.

== Goals ==
The stated goals of the SPP were cooperation and information sharing, improving productivity, reducing the costs of trade, enhancing the joint stewardship of the environment, facilitating agricultural trade while creating a safer and more reliable food supply, and protecting people from disease.

== Announced funding ==
On 26 February 2008, Canada's Minister of Finance Jim Flaherty, announced his government's 2008 budget, which included "$29 million over two years to meet priorities under the Security and Prosperity Partnership of North America".

== Trilateral summit meetings ==
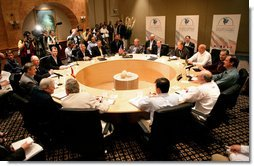
The 2006 meeting of the Security and Prosperity Partnership of North America

As part of SPP, an annual trilateral summit was held between the leaders of the three countries. Following the cancellation of the SPP in 2009, meetings continued as the North American Leaders' Summit.

- March 23, 2005 - Baylor University, Waco, Texas, United States

A video of the Waco SPP Trilateral Summit News Conference is available online.

- March 31, 2006 - Cancún, Quintana Roo, Mexico

Meeting between Mexican President Fox, Canadian Prime Minister Harper, and U.S. President Bush. A U.S. White House press release regarding the Cancun SPP Trilateral Summit is available online.

- August 20–21, 2007 - Montebello, Quebec, Canada

The United States, Canada, and Mexico had a major trilateral summit meeting regarding SPP at the Château Montebello in Montebello, Quebec. This conference was described as a public relations event with the purpose of promoting the SPP among investors and to reassure the public about the initiative. The summit was also noteworthy because a short five minute video uploaded to YouTube led to the eventual police admission of the use of undercover officers disguised as protesters at the summit. Critics charged that the undercover officers were agents provocateurs sent to disrupt the protest by inciting violence: "This circumstance is unique because it was among the very first occurrences in Canada where user-generated footage uploaded to video-sharing site YouTube elicited an official police response offered in defence of police tactics".

- April 21–22, 2008 - New Orleans, Louisiana, United States

In his 2008 State of the Union address, President George W. Bush announced that a summit on the SPP would be held from April 21–22, 2008, in New Orleans, Louisiana. According to the White House, the summit focused on improving the SPP initiatives and on discussing "hemispheric and global issues of importance to North America".

- August 9–10, 2009 - Guadalajara, Jalisco, Mexico

== North American Competitiveness Council ==
The North American Competitiveness Council (NACC) was an official tri-national working group of the SPP. It was created at the second summit of the SPP in Cancún, Quintana Roo, Mexico, in March 2006. The SPP is an agreement between the leaders of the United States, Canada and Mexico to work towards a more integrated North American economy and security region. Composed of 30 corporate representatives from some of North America's largest companies, the North American Competitiveness Council has been mandated to set priorities for the SPP and to act as a stable driver of the integration process through changes in government in all three countries.

The NACC became inactive in 2009.

=== History ===
While the North American Competitiveness Council was officially born on March 31, 2006, at the second annual summit of the Security and Prosperity Partnership of North America, its seeds were planted three months earlier. On January 10 and 11, 2006, United Parcel Service, the Council of the Americas and the North American Business Committee convened a "public/private sector dialogue on the SPP" in Louisville, Kentucky, United States. The meeting was attended by 50 government officials and business leaders from Canada, the U.S. and Mexico, including officials from the Canadian Privy Council Office, the Mexican Presidency, the U.S. Department of Homeland Security and corporate reps from ExxonMobil, DaimlerChrysler, Ford, Tyco, and FedEx.

According to an account of the meeting from the Council of the Americas, attendees discussed "marrying policy issues with business priorities", and that "one critical factor in the success of the SPP will be the active engagement of the North American business community." Private sector supporters of the SPP "need to build a genuine constituency for North American integration if it is to move forward successfully", says the Council of the Americas report. "Leadership from governments that recognizes the importance of business issues to the overall social welfare empowers the private sector to engage substantively and pragmatically on trade and security issues without undue deference to political sensibilities."

On March 15, 2006, North American business leaders met in Washington, D.C., with U.S. Secretary of Commerce Carlos Gutierrez, Canadian Deputy Minister of Industry Suzanne Hurtubise and Dr. Alberto Ortega from the Mexican Presidency. According to a backgrounder from the Council of the Americas, the government officials were interested in "the views of the North American business community on priorities for the SPP, as well as recommendations from business leaders on how the SPP can help their companies be more competitive in the global market, how SPP can reduce the cost of doing business, and any specific recommendations to cut red tape or eliminate unnecessary barriers to trade in North America." Business leaders were also asked about the possible creation and institutionalization of a North American Competitiveness Council. There was unanimous support.

Just over two weeks later, U.S. President George W. Bush, Canadian Prime Minister Stephen Harper and former Mexican President Vicente Fox met in Cancún for the second annual summit of the Security and Prosperity Partnership. The leaders were each accompanied by five private sector representatives who pledged their commitment to the SPP process and helped set the agenda for the North American Competitiveness Council (NACC). They decided that the council would be composed of 30 CEOs, ten from each country, who would meet annually with senior government officials to advise them on corporate priorities for the SPP.

The NACC was officially launched on June 15, 2006, at a joint press conference held by Carlos Gutierrez, Mexican Economy Minister Sergio García de Alba and Canadian Industry Minister Maxime Bernier. According to a Council of the Americas report, the purpose of institutionalizing the North American business community's involvement in the SPP process was, "so that the work will continue through changes in administrations." The NACC will make sure that, "governments look to the private sector to tell them what needs to be done." According to a Canadian press release, the NACC "has a mandate to provide governments with recommendations on broad issues such as border facilitation and regulation, as well as the competitiveness of key sectors including automotive, transportation, manufacturing and services."

The NACC met again in Washington, D.C., on August 15, 2006. The meeting was chaired by Ron Covais, President of the Americas for Lockheed Martin, and was co-hosted by the U.S. Chamber of Commerce and the Council of the Americas – both U.S. NACC co-secretariats. The U.S. business leaders outlined their key priorities as "standards and regulatory cooperation, border security and infrastructure, supply chain management, energy integration, innovation, and external dimensions", but the NACC as a whole eventually agreed on three overall priorities: border crossing facilitation (to be handled by the Canadian NACC members), regulatory convergence (to be handled by the U.S. NACC) and energy integration, which the Mexican NACC members would handle.

The North American Competitiveness Council met with SPP ministers for the first time on February 23, 2007, in Ottawa. At that meeting, the business council released a preliminary report containing over 50 recommendations for continental integration, including a North American resource pact and intensified regulatory convergence between all three countries.

On July 26, 2007, the conservative, non-partisan U.S. government watchdog Judicial Watch notified Commerce Secretary Carlos Gutierrez that it was seeking access to the meetings and records of the North American Competitiveness Council (NACC) under the provisions of the Federal Advisory Committee Act (FACA) – the federal open meetings law (5 U.S.C App. 2 §3(2)). "Specifically", said Judicial Watch in a press release, the group, "seeks to attend and/or participate in meetings of the NACC and its U.S. component subcommittees."

The NACC met again with SPP ministers and NAFTA leaders on August 21, 2007, at the Chateau Montebello hotel in Quebec, Canada. It was the only non-governmental organization with full access to the meeting, the third Security and Prosperity Partnership Leaders Summit since March 2005. The group of CEOs released another report praising the Canadian, Mexican and U.S. governments for moving quickly on NACC recommendations for a North American Regulatory Cooperation Framework and Intellectual Property Action Plan. The NACC report explained that the group is prepared, "to move beyond our initial report" and would be "pleased to engage on other strategic issues affecting the competitiveness and security of the North American economies."

The SPP has scheduled a meeting in New Orleans on April 21–22, 2008, where the three government leaders will meet with corporate leaders from each of the three nations to discuss "harmonization" of policies, in order to integrate environmental, energy, labor, and other standards for the benefit of these large corporations and for the purported benefit of mutual security.

=== Media coverage ===
Until the February 23, 2007, NACC/SPP meeting in Ottawa, there had been very little media coverage of the North American Competitiveness Council, its mandate or its meetings. In fact, the only mainstream North American source to write about the NACC has been Canada's Maclean's magazine, which ran a story on September 13 by Luiza Savage called "Meet NAFTA 2.0."

Savage described the NACC as a "cherry-picked group of executives who were whisked to Cancún in March by the leaders of Canada, the U.S. and Mexico, and asked to come up with a plan for taking North American integration beyond NAFTA." She quoted Annette Verschuren, president of Home Depot Canada, who called the Cancún meeting "an intimate discussion" and "a lot of fun [because] there were no reporters, just a freewheeling discussion on the things that drive you crazy."

Ron Covais of Lockheed Martin told Savage that, "The guidance from the ministers was, 'tell us what we need to do and we'll make it happen,'" and that rather than going through the legislative process in any country, the Security and Prosperity Partnership must be implemented in incremental changes by executive agencies, bureaucrats and regulators. "We've decided not to recommend any things that would require legislative changes", Covais tells Savage, "because we won't get anywhere."

=== NACC Members ===
U.S. Representatives:

- Campbell Soup Company
- Chevron Corporation
- Ford Motor Company
- FedEx Corporation
- General Electric Company
- General Motors Corp.
- Kansas City Southern
- Lockheed Martin Corporation
- Merck & Co., Inc.
- Mittal Steel USA
- New York Life Insurance Company
- The Procter & Gamble Company (joined in 2007)
- UPS
- Wal-Mart Stores, Inc.
- Whirlpool Corporation (note: Herman Cain was incorrectly noted as being a member of the NACC/SPP in representing the Whirlpool Corporation. Herman Cain served on the board of directors for Whirlpool. In order to be eligible to be an executive member of the NACC listed above, you must be a senior executive of the company being represented. Jeff Fettig had been CEO of Whirlpool since 2004.)

Canadian Representatives:

- Dominic D'Alessandro, Manulife Financial
- Paul Desmarais, Jr., Power Corporation of Canada
- David A. Ganong, Ganong Bros. Limited
- Richard George, Suncor Energy Inc.
- E. Hunter Harrison, CN
- Linda Hasenfratz, Linamar Corporation (NACC chairperson)
- Michael Sabia, Bell Canada Enterprises
- Jim Shepherd, Canfor Corporation
- Annette Verschuren, The Home Depot
- Richard E. Waugh, Scotiabank

Mexican Representatives:

- José Luís Barraza, President of Consejo Coordinador Empresarial (CCE) and CEO of Grupo Impulso, Realiza & Asociados, Inmobiliaria Realiza and Optima
- Gastón Azcárraga, President of Consejo Mexicano de Hombres de Negocios (CMHN) and CEO of Mexicana de Aviación and Grupo Posadas
- León Halkin, President of Confederación de Cámaras Industriales (CONCAMIN) and chairman of the board and CEO of four companies in the industrial and real estate markets
- Valentín Díez, Chairman of the Mexican Business Council for Trade, Investment, and Technology (COMCE) and former Vicepresident of Grupo Modelo.
- Jaime Yesaki, President of Consejo Nacional Agropecuario (CNA) and CEO of several Poultry companies.
- Claudio X. González, President of Centro de Estudios Económicos del Sector Privado (CEESP) and chairman of the board and CEO Kimberly-Clark de Mexico
- Guillermo Vogel, Vice President of TAMSA (Tubos de Acero de México)
- César de Anda Molina, President and CEO of Avicar de Occidente
- Tomás González Sada, President and CEO of Grupo CYDSA
- Alfredo Moisés Ceja, President of Finca Montegrande

== Criticism ==
In 2006, CNN anchor Lou Dobbs argued that the SPP was part of a plan to merge the United States, Canada, and Mexico into a North American Union similar to the European Union. At the time, Dobbs claimed that U.S. President Bush, who left office on January 20, 2009, was to have bypassed Congress and ultimately create a union based on a Texas highway corridor.

The Council of Canadians claimed that the SPP extended the controversial "no fly list" of the United States, made Canadian water a communal resource, and forced Canada and Mexico to adopt the United States' security policies—one of which would allow foreign military forces to neglect sovereignty in the case of a "civil emergency". It also touched on the issue of Albertan tar sands expansion to five times its current size.

On May 10, 2007, Conservative MP Leon Benoit, chair of the Canadian House of Commons Standing Committee on International Trade, prevented University of Alberta professor Gordon Laxer from testifying that SPP would leave Canadians "to freeze in the dark" because "Canada itself—unlike most industrialized nations—has no national plan or reserves to protect its own supplies" by saying Laxer's testimony was irrelevant, defying a majority vote to overrule his motion, shutting down the committee meeting, and leaving with the other three out of four Conservative members; the meeting later continued, presided over by the Liberal vice-chair. After these disruptions, the National Post reported on a Conservative party manual to, among other things, usurp Parliamentary committees and cause chaos in unfavourable committees. The New Democratic Party (NDP) also criticized SPP for being undemocratic, not open to Parliament, and opaque. NDP leader Jack Layton described the process as not simply unconstitutional, but "non-constitutional", held completely outside the usual mechanisms of oversight.

Approximately thirty U.S.-based organizations also sent an open letter to Congress on April 21, 2008, criticizing the secrecy and lack of any sort of democratic oversight:

"What differentiates the SPP from other security and trade agreements is that it is not subject to Congressional oversight or approval. The SPP establishes a corporate/government bureaucracy for implementation that excludes civil society participation. ... Facing a worrisome pact pushed forward in secrecy, it is time for Congress to halt this undemocratic approach and establish a process based on openness, accountability, and the participation of civil society.

== Cancellation ==
In August 2009, the SPP website was updated to say: "The Security and Prosperity Partnership of North America (SPP) is no longer an active initiative. There will not be any updates to this site". Subsequent to this the website link does not connect and the cache website links do not work.

The NDP called this a "victory" which is "the result of the active and sustained efforts across the country, and across North America, of Canadian, Mexican, and American activists from the labour movement, civil society, progressive legislators and all those concerned and committed to build a better quality of life in our Canada and throughout North America".

== Renewed discussions ==
On February 4, 2011, Canadian Prime Minister Stephen Harper and U.S. President Barack Obama announced a new security and prosperity initiative with plans to "pursue a perimeter approach to security in ways that support economic competitiveness, job creation, and prosperity".

On March 13, 2011, the Canadian government announced it was beginning a five-week consultation process "with all levels of government and with communities, non-governmental organizations and the private sector, as well as with our citizens on the implementation of the shared vision for perimeter security and economic competitiveness".

== See also ==
- Canada–United States relations
- Canada–U.S. Civil Assistance Plan, signed February 14, 2008
- North American Free Trade Agreement
- North American Plant Protection Organization
- North American Union
- North American currency union (the currency of which is often called the "Amero")
- North American Competitiveness Council
- North American Aerospace Defense Command
- Partnership for Prosperity and Security in the Caribbean
- Alliance for Progress
- Defence Diplomacy
- Robert Pastor

Related infrastructure projects:

- North American SuperCorridor Coalition – Connecting Mexico City, central United States, and several Canadian provinces
- Trans-Texas Corridor – Superhighway connecting Northern Mexico and Texas
- East–West Economic Corridor – Superhighway connecting Southeast Asian countries
- Pan-European Corridor X – Superhighway connecting the European Union
- European route E73 – fifth segment of Pan-European Corridor with toll road listings
