= Sylvie Bedard =

Canadian diplomat

Sylvie Bédard is the Canadian Ambassador to Ecuador.

Since joining the Department of Foreign Affairs and International Trade in 1995 Bedard has served as director of the Centre of Learning for International Affairs and Leadership in the Canadian Foreign Service Institute from 2016 to 2018, deputy director of Aboriginal Affairs from 2005 to 2006, Canada-US Relations from 2002 to 2004 and Inter-American Affairs from 2001 to 2002.
