= Washington State Route 240 =

State highway in Benton County, Washington, US

State Route 240
- Map of the Tri-Cities and Hanford areas with SR 240 highlighted in red

Route information
- Auxiliary route of SR 24
- Maintained by WSDOT
- Length: 41.31 mi (66.48 km)
- Existed: 1964–present

Major junctions
- West end: SR 24 near the Hanford Nuclear Reservation
- SR 225 near West Richland; SR 224 in Richland; I-182 / US 12 in Richland
- East end: US 395 in Kennewick

Location
- Country: United States
- State: Washington
- Counties: Benton

Highway system
- State highways in Washington; Interstate; US; State; Scenic; Pre-1964; 1964 renumbering; Former
← SR 231	→ SR 241

State Route 240 (SR 240) is a state highway in the U.S. state of Washington. It travels diagonally from northwest to southwest within Benton County, serving the Hanford Nuclear Reservation and the Tri-Cities region. The highway begins at a junction with SR 24 and travels around Richland on a limited-access bypass. From there, it briefly overlaps Interstate 182 (I-182) and continues southeast as a freeway along the Columbia River into Kennewick, terminating at an interchange with U.S. Route 395 (US 395). SR 240 is one of the busiest highways in the Tri-Cities region, with a daily average of 76,000 vehicles on a section crossing the Yakima River Delta.

The riverfront route between Richland and Kennewick was part of a 19th-century wagon road and the Inland Empire Highway, a state road established in 1913. It was incorporated into US 410 in 1926 and was part of US 12 from 1967 to 1986. The highway through the Hanford Nuclear Reservation was established as a state highway in the 1950s and opened on July 14, 1965, to connect Richland to the Vernita Bridge on SR 24.

== Route description ==
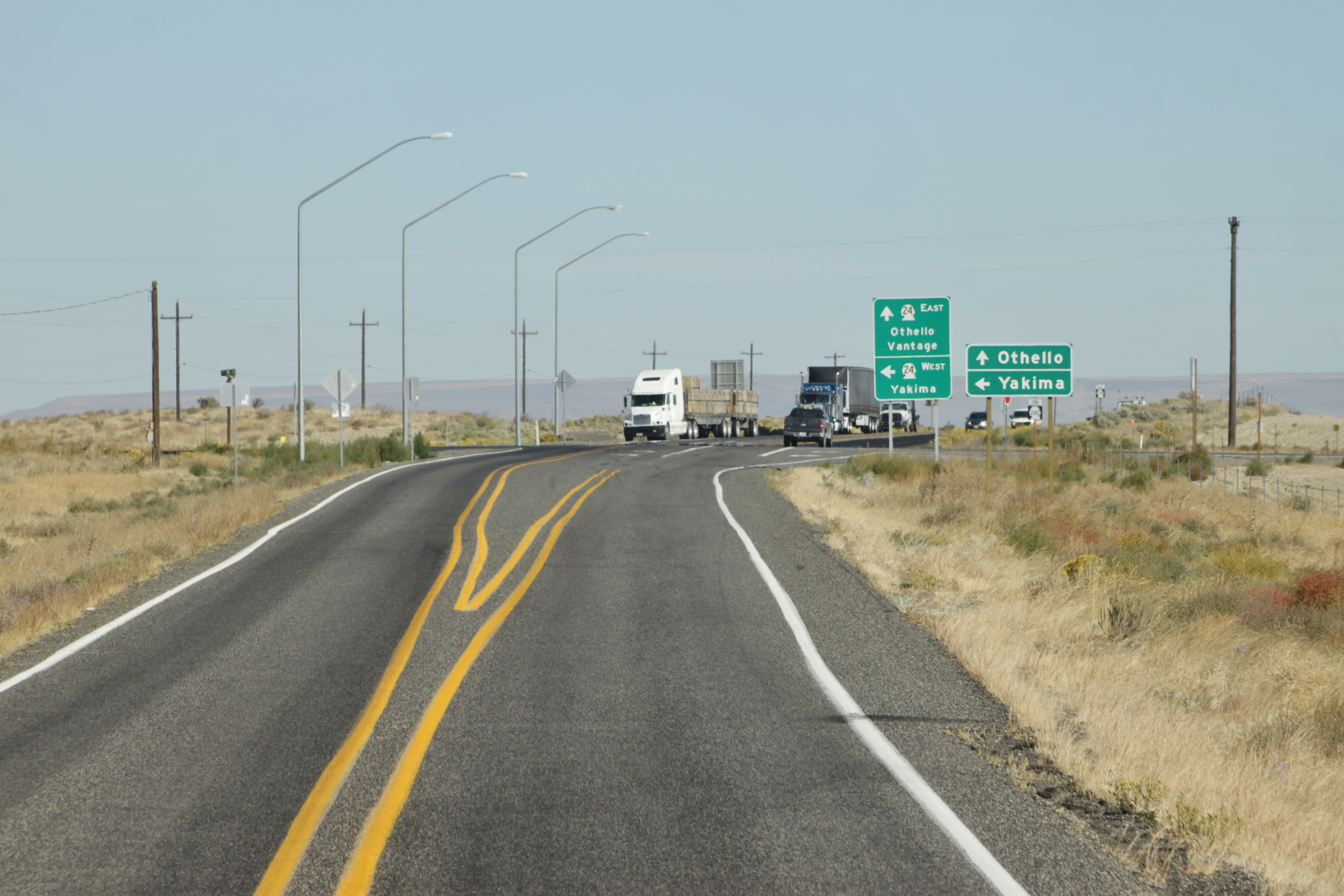
SR 240 westbound at its terminus with SR 24 on the Hanford Nuclear Reservation

SR 240 begins at an intersection with SR 24 west of the Hanford Nuclear Reservation in northwestern Benton County. SR 24 continues west towards Yakima and north across the Hanford Reach of the Columbia River on the Vernita Bridge. SR 240 travels southeasterly along Cold Creek Valley at the foot of the Yakima Ridge and Rattlesnake Hills, forming the boundary between the Saddle Mountain National Wildlife Refuge (part of the Hanford Reach National Monument) and the rest of the Hanford Site, including the Laser Interferometer Gravitational-wave Observatory. Cold Creek empties into the Yakima River near the Horn Rapids Dam, where the highway intersects SR 225, which continues southwest to Benton City.

About one mile (1.6 km) downstream from the dam, SR 240 enters the city of Richland and continues its southeasterly course along the north side of the Yakima River. The highway passes the city's landfill and a suburban golf course before reaching an intersection with Stevens Drive and Jadwin Avenue at the edge of Richland's residential neighborhoods. From the intersection, SR 240 turns southwest onto the six-lane Bypass Highway, which acts as a divided highway with limited intersections that travels around the west side of Richland. Jadwin Avenue continues southeast from the intersection as a business route of SR 240, while Stevens Drive continues north to the Pacific Northwest National Laboratory.

The four-mile (6.4 km) Bypass Highway is followed to the west by the Tri-City Railroad, formerly the main rail link to the Hanford Site and now owned by the Port of Benton, and to the east by the multi-use Urban Green Belt Trail. The highway travels south around Richland's suburban neighborhoods and passes the Richland Airport. SR 240 intersects SR 224 at Van Giesen Street, providing connections to West Richland and Benton City, and continues southeast along the Yakima River to the Chamna Natural Preserve. At the park, SR 240 crosses over and intersects Interstate 182 (I-182) in a trumpet interchange, beginning a short concurrency with I-182 and the already-overlapping U.S. Route 12 (US 12). The three highways continue east for approximately one mile (1.6 km) and reach a combination interchange with George Washington Way, a local road that carries part of SR 240 Business. From the interchange, SR 240 turns south and crosses the Yakima River towards Kennewick, while I-182 and US 12 continue east across the Columbia River to Pasco.

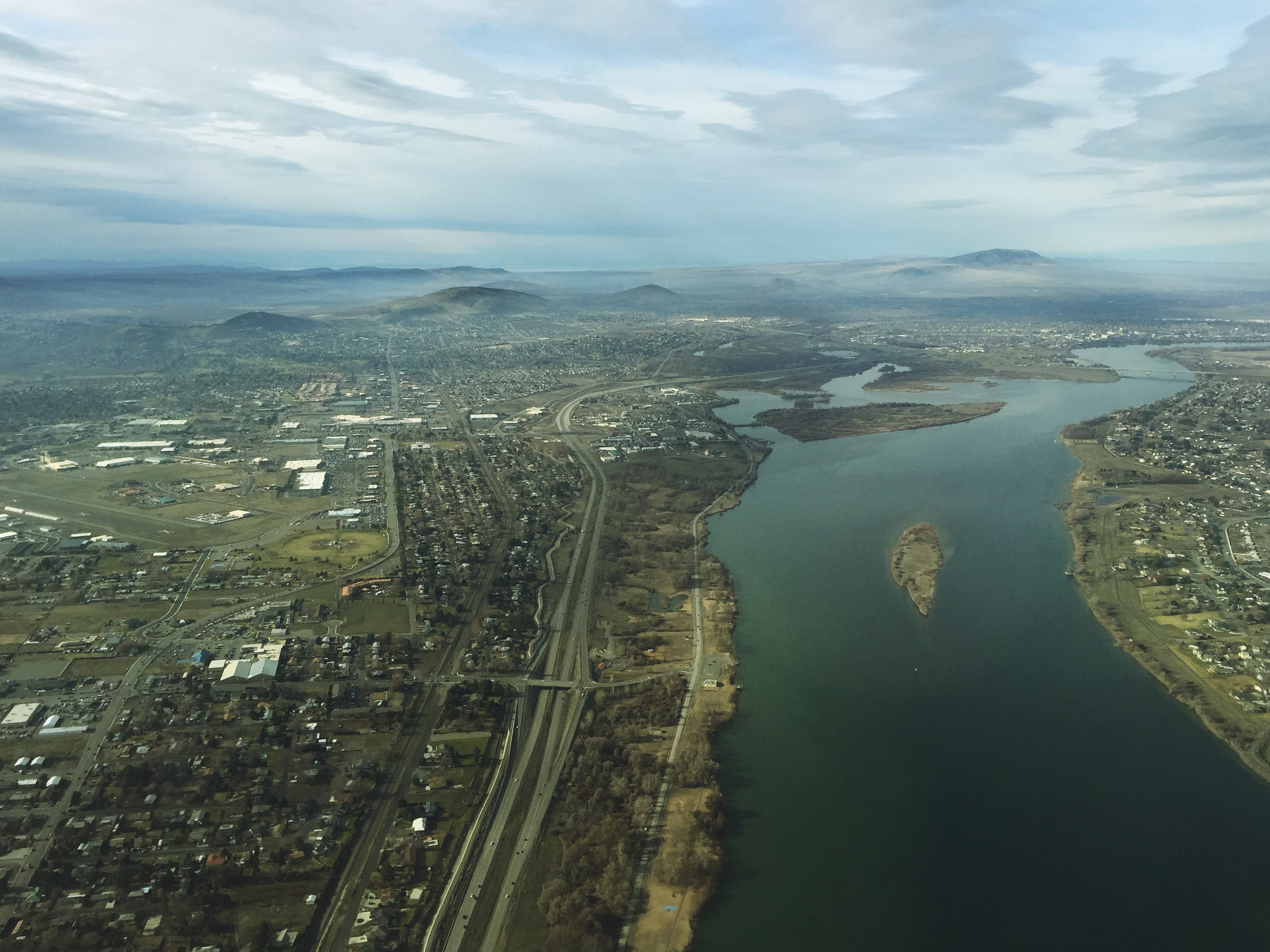
Aerial view of SR 240 along the Columbia River in Kennewick

SR 240 continues across the Yakima River Delta as a fully grade-separated freeway, fronted to the west by a branch of the Union Pacific Railroad and the east by the Sacagawea Heritage Trail. The freeway narrows to six lanes at an interchange with the Columbia Park Trail in the Richland Wye and to four lanes at a partial cloverleaf interchange with Columbia Center Boulevard, located north of the Columbia Center Mall and the Toyota Center. SR 240 enters Kennewick after the interchange and continues along the south side of the Columbia River and Columbia Park, passing north of suburban neighborhoods and the Vista Field airport, which closed in 2013. The freeway intersects Edison Street and Columbia Park Trail on the north side of the railroad before reaching its eastern terminus, a dogbone interchange with US 395 at the south end of the Blue Bridge. The interchange also includes direct ramps to the northbound lanes of US 395 as well as access to Columbia Drive, a local street that connects to downtown Kennewick. The junction is located near the site where the Kennewick Man, a skeleton belonging to a 9,000-year-old man, was discovered in 1996.

SR 240 is maintained by the Washington State Department of Transportation (WSDOT), which conducts an annual survey on the state's highways to measure traffic volume in terms of annual average daily traffic. The busiest section of the highway, across the Yakima River Delta south of I-182, carried a daily average of 76,000 vehicles in 2016; the least busiest section of the highway, near its intersection with SR 24, carried only 2,600 vehicles. The Bypass Highway section of SR 240 in Richland is designated as part of the National Highway System, a network of roads identified as important to the national economy, defense, and mobility. The corridor, along with the freeway section from Richland to Kennewick, was also designated as a Highway of Statewide Significance by the Washington State Legislature.

== History ==
The highway between Richland and Kennewick was originally part of the first federal wagon road to be constructed in the Pacific Northwest, laid in 1853 between Fort Walla Walla and the Puget Sound region via Naches Pass. The wagon road is commemorated with a historic marker in Columbia Park, just north of the Edison Street interchange on SR 240. Local Native American tribes also used a trail following the route of the Hanford Highway to reach points west of Rattlesnake Mountain, including Yakima. By the early 1910s, several unpaved roads connected Richland to the Cold Creek Valley and Kennewick via a more westerly crossing of the Yakima River Delta on a bridge built by the Benton County government in 1906. The Richland–Kennewick section was incorporated into the Inland Empire Highway, a paved cross-state route created by the legislature in 1913. The Yakima Valley section of the Inland Empire Highway, later numbered as State Road 3 and Primary State Highway 3, was incorporated into the national highway system in 1926 as part of US 410 between Yakima and Pasco. The Columbia Trail portion of US 410 was paved in concrete by the Benton County government in 1932, constituting the region's first paved highway.

The road along Cold Creek was closed in November 1943 as part of the establishment of a federal weapons development facility at the Hanford Site during World War II. To serve the new facility and evacuate residents in the event of an emergency, a four-lane highway bypassing Richland to the west was constructed by the county government in July 1948, connecting to US 410 with a new bridge over the Yakima River. The four-lane bridge was built by the Atomic Energy Commission and opened in 1951, replacing a bailey bridge that had been in use since 1948. The remaining stretch of US 410 was moved to an expressway connecting with the new Pioneer Memorial Bridge, which opened on July 30, 1954.

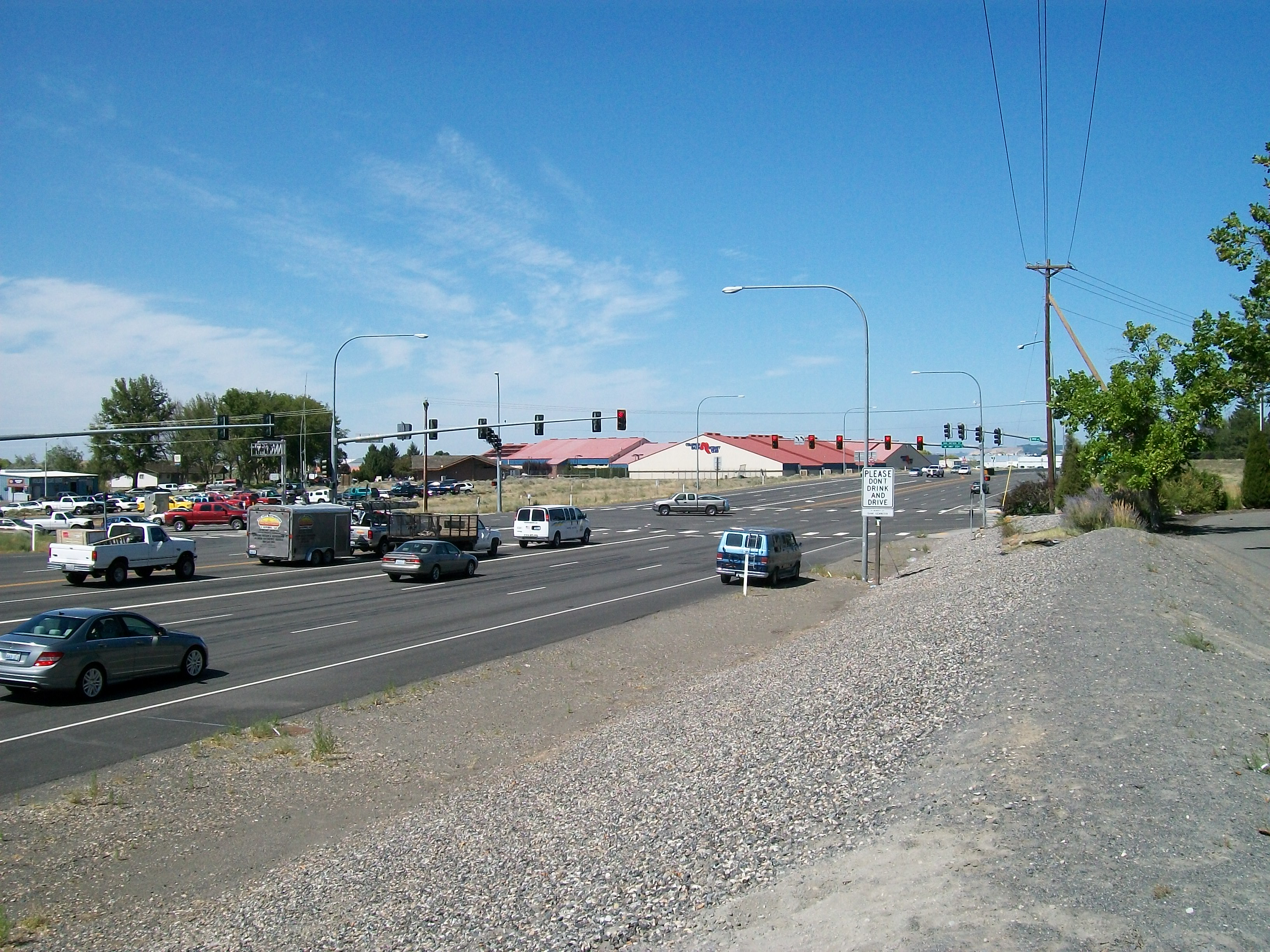
A section of the Richland Bypass Highway, opened in 1948 and later incorporated into SR 240, as seen from SR 224

The southern section of the Richland bypass, terminating near Hanford, was designated as Secondary State Highway 3R (SSH 3R) in 1953 and extended west via modern SR 224 to Kiona two years later. Shortly after the Atomic Energy Commission approved preliminary plans for a state highway across part of the Hanford Nuclear Reservation in 1959, the state legislature designated it as Secondary State Highway 11C (SSH 11C) and allocated gas tax funds to construct it, despite opposition from Yakima legislators. Under the state law, passed despite opposition from Yakima legislators, SSH 11C would not be built until a bridge replacing the Vernita ferry was ready for traffic. The 22-mile (35 km) highway was rebuilt at a cost of $770,000 (equivalent to $5.83 million in 2024 dollars) and opened on July 14, 1965, linking Richland to the nearly-complete Vernita Bridge. An additional 7 miles (11 km) of the highway, bypassing the Pacific Northwest National Laboratory in North Richland, opened on June 20, 1968.

SR 240 was created during the 1964 state highway renumbering as part of the new sign route system, replacing SSH 11C and the eastern section of SSH 3R. The Richland–Kennewick freeway was renumbered in 1967 after US 12 was extended west to replace portions of US 410. US 12 was then moved onto the newly completed I-182 in the 1985 and SR 240 was extended east to a junction with the relocated US 395 in Kennewick. The Richland Bypass was also widened from two lanes to five in 1980, at a cost of $1.83 million.

The population of the Tri-Cities region grew substantially in the late 20th century, causing increased traffic congestion on the urban sections of SR 240. A $58 million highway widening program was completed in 2007 by WSDOT, expanding SR 240 to six lanes between Stevens Drive and Columbia Center Boulevard. The Yakima River Bridge was demolished in 2004 and replaced by a set of two bridges carrying three lanes each, as well as a multi-use bicycle and pedestrian trail. The western portion of the Columbia River Trail interchange at the Richland Wye was converted into a roundabout that opened to traffic in June 2007. A separate $16 million project completed in November 2009 converted the cloverleaf interchange at US 395 into a dogbone interchange with two roundabouts to improve safety and traffic flow. Due to remaining congestion issues on the Bypass Highway, WSDOT is considering several strategies to increase capacity, including reversible lanes, high-occupancy vehicle lanes, and opening the shoulder to traffic during peak periods. Long-term plans from the City of Richland propose the conversion of the Bypass into a full freeway with interchanges and right-in/right-out access to replace existing intersections.

== Major intersections ==
The entire highway is in Benton County.

Location	mi	km	Destinations	Notes
	0.00	0.00	SR 24 – Othello, Vantage, Yakima	Western terminus; continues as SR 24 eastbound
	20.48	32.96	SR 225 south – Benton City, Hanford Nuclear Reservation	
Richland	28.86	46.45	SR 240 Bus. south (Jadwin Avenue) / Stevens Drive	
Richland	30.25	48.68	SR 224 west / Van Giesen Street – West Richland	
Richland	West end of freeway			
Richland	33.10	53.27	I-182 west / US 12 west to I-82 – Yakima, Pendleton	West end of I-182/US 12 overlap
Richland	34.22	55.07	I-182 east / US 12 east / George Washington Way – Pasco	East end of I-182/US 12 overlap
Richland	34.22	55.07	SR 240 Bus. north (George Washington Way)	
Richland	35.95	57.86	Columbia Park Trail	
Richland	37.05	59.63	Columbia Center Boulevard – Toyota Center	
Kennewick	38.62	62.15	Edison Street	
Kennewick	40.51	65.19	Columbia Park Trail – Columbia Park	Westbound exit and entrance only
Kennewick	41.31	66.48	US 395 / Columbia Drive – Pasco, Spokane, Pendleton	Eastern terminus; continues as Columbia Drive
1.000 mi = 1.609 km; 1.000 km = 0.621 mi: Concurrency terminus; Incomplete access

== Business route ==
State Route 240 Business
- Location: Richland
- Length: 4.0 mi (6.4 km)

State Route 240 Business (SR 240 Bus.) is a business route of State Route 240 within the city of Richland. It travels north–south through the city's main commercial center, primarily on George Washington Way and Jadwin Avenue, from the eastern interchange with I-182 to the Stevens Drive intersection at the north end of the Richland Bypass. The northbound lanes continue on George Washington Way and travel west on McMurray Street before joining Jadwin Avenue, while the southbound lanes stay on Jadwin Avenue until it intersects George Washington Way near Howard Amon Park. Sections of George Washington Way carry a daily average of 42,000 vehicles and are also listed as part of the National Highway System.
