= Washington State Route 225 =

Highway located entirely in Benton County, Washington

State Route 225

Route information
- Auxiliary route of SR 22
- Maintained by WSDOT
- Length: 11.32 mi (18.22 km)
- Existed: 1991–present

Major junctions
- South end: SR 224 in Kiona
- North end: SR 240 at Horn Rapids Dam

Location
- Country: United States
- State: Washington
- County: Benton

Highway system
- State highways in Washington; Interstate; US; State; Scenic; Pre-1964; 1964 renumbering; Former
← SR 224	→ SR 231

State Route 225 (SR 225) is an 11.32-mile (18.22 km) long two-lane state highway located entirely in Benton County, Washington, United States. The highway travels over the Benton City – Kiona Bridge, which is listed on the Washington Heritage Register and National Register of Historic Places, over the Yakima River. After turning through Benton City, the highway parallels the river for the remainder of the route. Several different proposals have been introduced to alleviate traffic flow issues at the SR 224 / SR 225 interchange, which was ultimately replaced with a roundabout in 2016.

== Route description ==
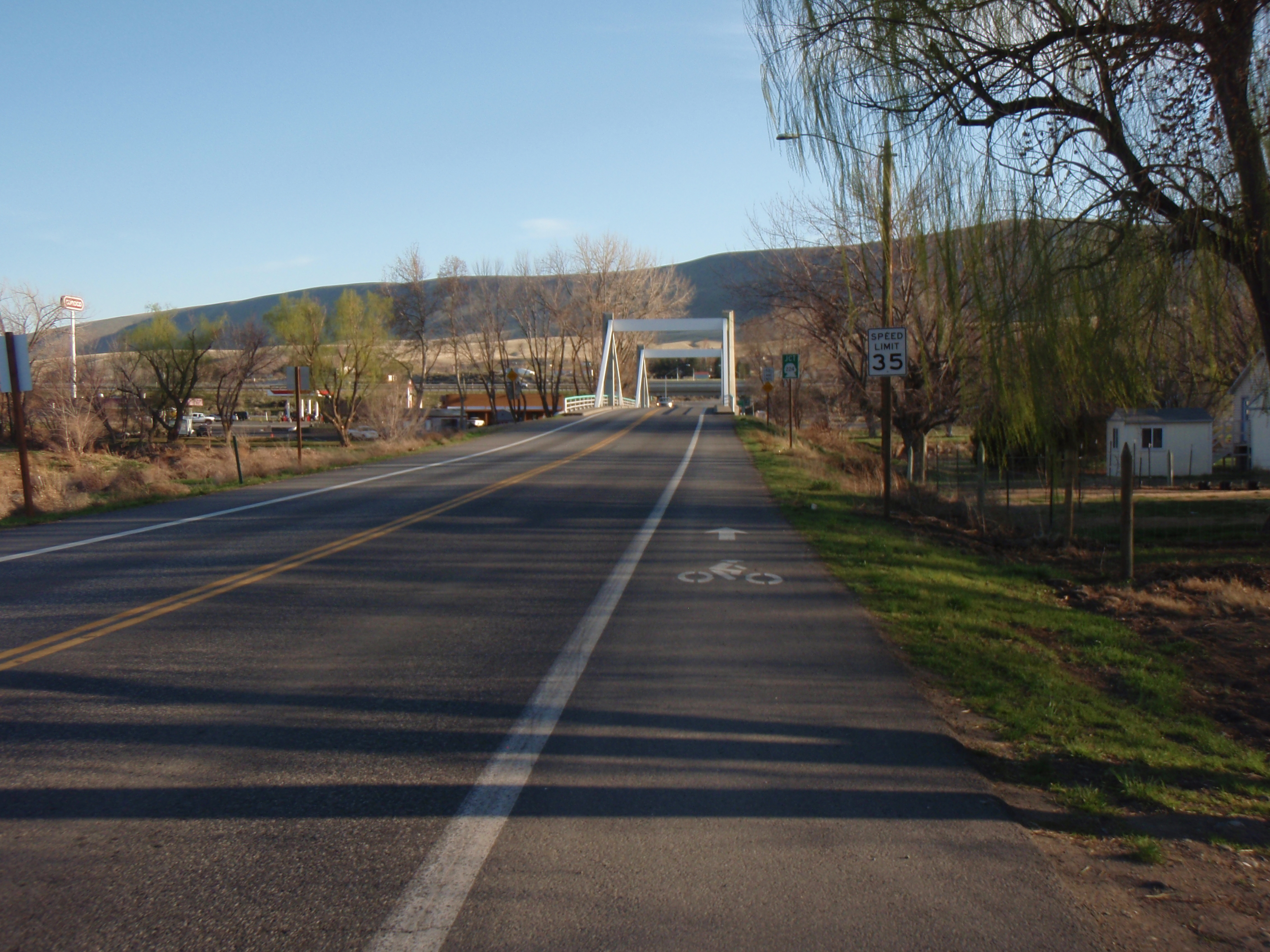
Benton City – Kiona Bridge from the north

SR 225 starts at a roundabout with SR 224 just north of the Interstate 82 / U.S. Route 12 interchange in south Benton City. The highway passes over the Yakima River on the Benton City – Kiona Bridge, which is listed on the Washington Heritage Register and the National Register of Historic Places. After a brief turn to the west, the highway resumes northerly into Benton City, serving as the main street through town. The Yakima River continues to parallel the highway as it exits town, passing between a hill on the west side and the river, followed by Horn Rapids County Park on the east until the highways terminus at SR 240.

Every year the Washington State Department of Transportation (WSDOT) conducts a series of surveys on its highways in the state to measure traffic volume. This is expressed in terms of annual average daily traffic (AADT), which is a measure of traffic volume for any average day of the year. In 2009, WSDOT calculated that as few as 1,000 cars used the highway at the terminus at SR 240, and as many as 7,800 cars at the interchange with SR 224.

== History ==
Horne Road was considered for inclusion on the state highway system by a legislative committee in 1986. SR 225 was added to the highway logs during the 1991 legislative session, and since then the only major changes to the highway have been the replacement of the bridge over a drainage canal about 0.27 miles (0.43 km) from the western terminus of the highway.

In 2010, WSDOT began studying several different designs for the SR 224 / SR 225 interchange to improve traffic flow, including signalizing the intersection, moving the off ramp from I-84 and making a 5-way stop, and multiple different roundabout solutions. The highway's southern terminus was converted into a roundabout in June 2016, at a cost of $4.5 million.

== Major intersections ==
The entire highway is in Benton County.

Location	mi	km	Destinations	Notes
Benton City	0.00	0.00	SR 224 to I-82 / US 12 – West Richland, Richland, Kennewick	Roundabout
Yakima River	0.03– 0.10	0.048– 0.16	Benton City – Kiona Bridge	
	11.32	18.22	SR 240 – Vantage, Richland	
1.000 mi = 1.609 km; 1.000 km = 0.621 mi
