= Washington State Route 224 =

State highway in Benton County, Washington, US

State Route 224

Route information
- Auxiliary route of SR 22
- Maintained by WSDOT
- Length: 10.15 mi (16.33 km)
- Existed: 1965–present

Major junctions
- West end: I-82 / US 12 in Benton City
- East end: SR 240 in Richland

Location
- Country: United States
- State: Washington
- Counties: Benton

Highway system
- State highways in Washington; Interstate; US; State; Scenic; Pre-1964; 1964 renumbering; Former
← SR 223	→ SR 225

State Route 224 (SR 224) is a 10.15-mile (16.33 km) long state highway located entirely in Benton County, Washington, United States. The highway serves to connect SR 225 to Interstate 82 (I-82) and U.S. Route 12 (US 12), and to link Benton City to West Richland and Richland. Before the 1964 state highway renumbering the highway was numbered Secondary State Highway 3R. SR 224 is a lightly traveled rural highway except through Richland, where an average of 16,000 cars traveled the highway daily in 2009. The Washington State Department of Transportation (WSDOT) rebuilt its southern terminus as a roundabout in 2016, as part of a project to improve traffic congestion near the Red Mountain AVA.

== Route description ==
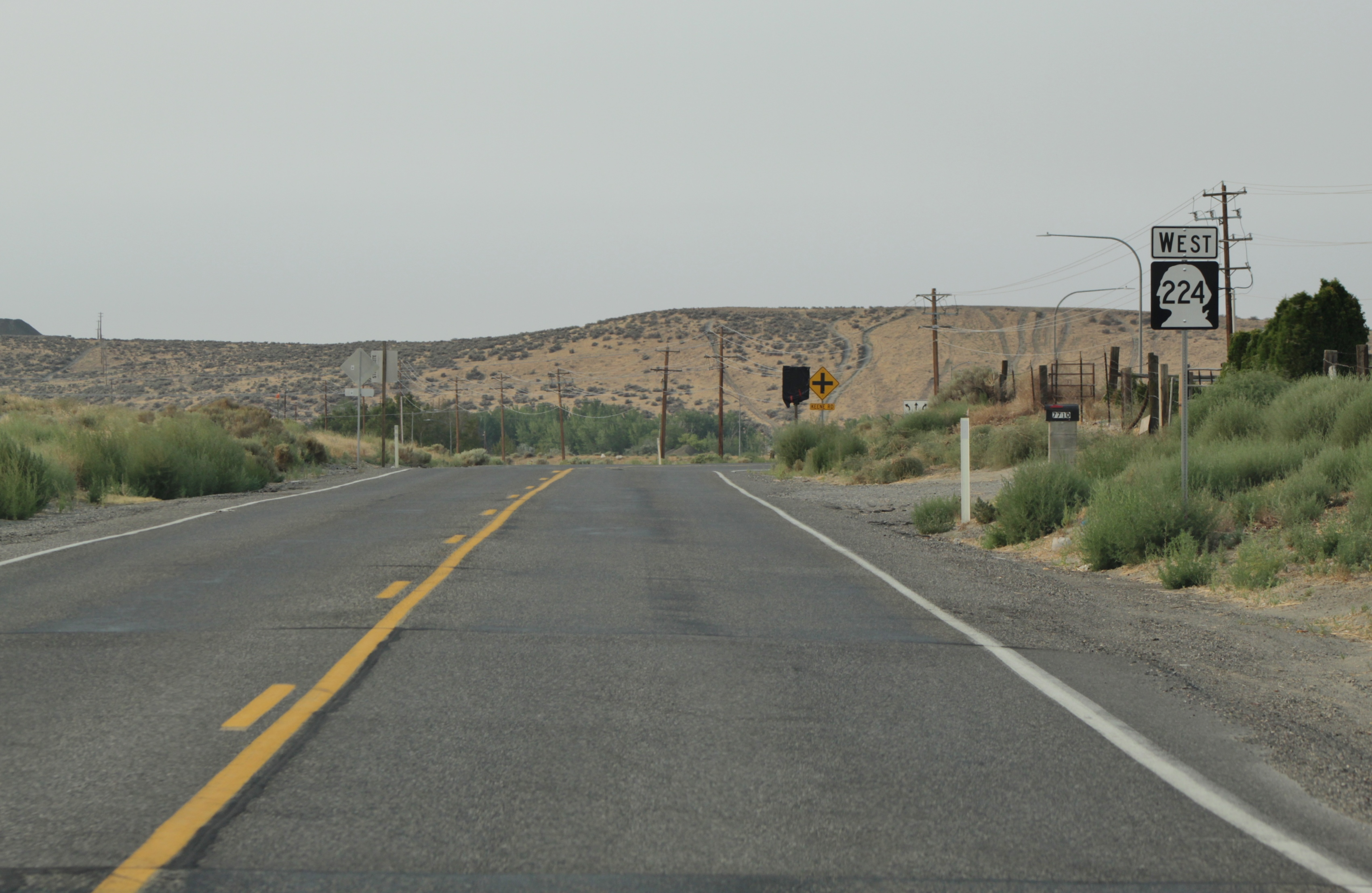
SR 224 westbound approaching Kiona

SR 224 begins at an interchange with I-82 in southern Benton City. After only 0.05 mi (80 m), SR 224 intersects SR 225 at a roundabout and turns to the east as Kennedy Road. After passing a park and ride lot on the south side of the highway, the road turns back to the north off of Kennedy road, paralleling the Yakima River, slowly turning northeast through a rural area of Benton County. After passing through farmland SR 224 enters West Richland and becomes Van Giesen Street, the main east–west thoroughfare of the city. Exiting the town, the highway passes over the Yakima River and enters Richland, passing through a rural area on the south side of Richland Airport. At the southeast corner of the airport, SR 224 crosses over a single track belonging to the Port of Benton and managed by Tri-City Railroad and terminates at an intersection with SR 240 (the Richland Bypass Highway). Van Giesen Street continues east from the terminus of SR 224 for another 1.7 miles (2.7 km), intersecting SR 240 Business near the western shore of the Columbia River.

The highway is primarily a two-lane road between Benton City and West Richland. The road expands to four lanes in West Richland, a width the highway remains to its terminus in Richland. Speed limits posted on the highway range from 30 miles per hour (48 km/h) to 55 miles per hour (89 km/h). Every year WSDOT conducts a series of surveys on its highways in the state to measure traffic volume. This is expressed in terms of annual average daily traffic (AADT), which is a measure of traffic volume for any average day of the year. In 2009, WSDOT calculated that as few as 3,200 cars traveled through the intersection at Keene Road, west of West Richland, and as many as 16,000 cars at the eastern terminus.

== History ==
Shield of former SSH 3R

A roadway has connected Benton City to Richland since at least 1926, while a road with an alignment more similar to that of the current highway first appeared on maps in 1939, with termini at the concurrent highways U.S. Route 410 and PSH 3. The highway now known as SR 224 was numbered Secondary State Highway 3R (SSH 3R) between 1937 and the 1964 state highway renumbering, which abolished the Primary and Secondary highway numbers, replacing them with Sign Route numbers, later renamed State Routes.

The Kiona interchange on I-82 was dedicated and opened on June 26, 1974, and cost $3 million to construct. The interchange was built as part of the initial construction of I-82 through southern Washington. The current bridge that carries SR 224 over the Yakima River was constructed in 1993, replacing the original bridge on the highway as part of a widening project. Local leaders had been lobbying for a bridge replacement and street widening since the mid-1970s, following floods that damaged sections of SR 224. A proposal to remove SR 224 from the state highway system was considered by a legislative committee in 1986.

The highway's southern terminus, at I-82 and SR 225, was converted into a roundabout in June 2016 to improve traffic flow. The $4.5 million project was the first project funded by the Connecting Washington tax package, passed in 2015 by the state legislature. A road connecting SR 224 near the Red Mountain AVA to the a new interchange on I-82 is planned to begin construction in 2019 and will cost $24.9 million.

== Major intersections ==
The entire highway is in Benton County.

Location	mi	km	Destinations	Notes
Benton City	0.00	0.00	I-82 / US 12 to I-182 – Yakima, Richland, Kennewick	
Benton City	0.05– 0.06	0.080– 0.097	SR 225 north (First Street) – Benton City	Roundabout
Richland	10.15	16.33	SR 240 to I-182 / Van Giesen Street – Vantage, Kennewick	
1.000 mi = 1.609 km; 1.000 km = 0.621 mi
