= Benton City – Kiona Bridge =

Bridge in United States of America

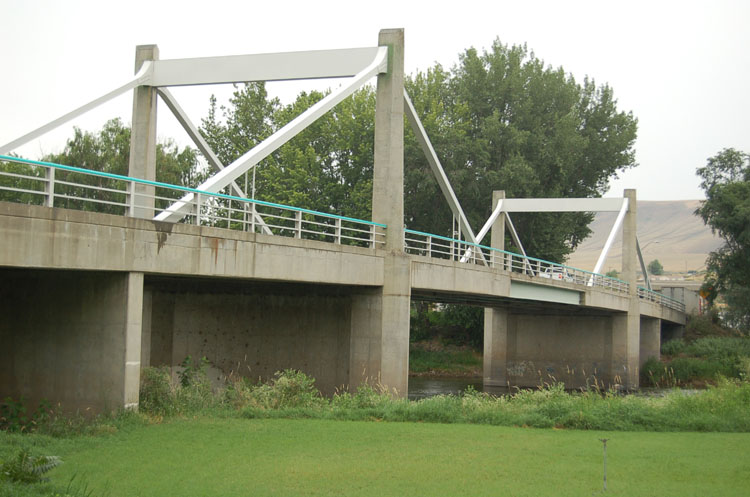
- Looking up at the bridge from the banks of the Yakima River
- Coordinates: 46°15′10.54″N 119°28′31.74″W
- Carries: SR 225
- Crosses: Yakima River
- Locale: Benton City, Washington
- Maintained by: WSDOT
- ID number: 082446000000000

Characteristics
- Design: box girder bridge/cable-stayed bridge
- Material: Steel
- Total length: 400 feet (121.9 m)
- Width: 26 feet (7.8 m)

History
- Designer: Homer M. Hadley
- Opened: July 4, 1957

Statistics
- Daily traffic: 9,500 (2012)

The Benton City – Kiona Bridge is a steel box girder and cable-stayed bridge carrying two lanes of Washington State Route 225 over the Yakima River in Benton City, Benton County, Washington. The current span was opened to traffic on July 4, 1957 and measures 400-foot-long (121.9 m) by 26-foot (7.8 m) wide. Two bridges had previously connected the cities of Benton City and Kiona before and were located 300 feet (91 m) downstream. The first bridge was open by 1901, and the immediate predecessor bridge was closed and torn down in 1964. The bridge is owned and maintained by the Washington State Department of Transportation, and was added to the Washington Heritage Register on January 25, 2002.

== Description ==
The Benton City – Kiona Bridge is located about 150 feet (46 m) from the southern terminus of Washington State Route 225 (SR 225) in Benton City, just south of downtown. The unincorporated community of Kiona is just south of concurrent highways Interstate 82 (I-82) / U.S. Route 12 (US 12), where SR 225 terminates. The bridge is 400-foot-long (121.9 m) by 26-foot (7.8 m) wide, carrying two lanes of SR 225, linking Benton City to I-82/US 12. While SR 225 on both sides of the bridge features bicycle lanes, the bridge does not. The bridge does feature 4-foot-wide (1.2 m) sidewalks raised 10 inches (25 cm) above the roadway surface.

The bridge, as well as the remainder of SR 225 are considered a major collector road by the Washington State Department of Transportation (WSDOT), which the Federal Highway Administration defines as linking towns to larger arterials. Every year, WSDOT conducts a series of surveys on its highways in the state to measure traffic volume. This is expressed in terms of average annual daily traffic (AADT), a measure of traffic volume for any average day of the year. In 2012, WSDOT calculated that 9,500 vehicles traveled on SR-225 along the bridge.

== History ==
=== Earlier spans ===
The first span recorded was built by 1901. That bridge was destroyed during a flood along the Yakima River in late 1917. This bridge was recorded on the Pasco quadrangle produced by the United States Geological Survey in 1914. The letters "US" were inscribed in one of the approach spans of the bridge as a way marker for travelers through the region. Major flooding happened along the Yakima River near Benton City in 1894, 1917, 1922, 1933, and 1948. A new bridge was built after the original span collapsed in the flood. By 1954 the second bridge was considered no longer sufficient for the traveling public with a roadway less than 17 feet (5.2 m) wide. The second bridge was torn down in 1964, seven years after the opening of the current bridge.

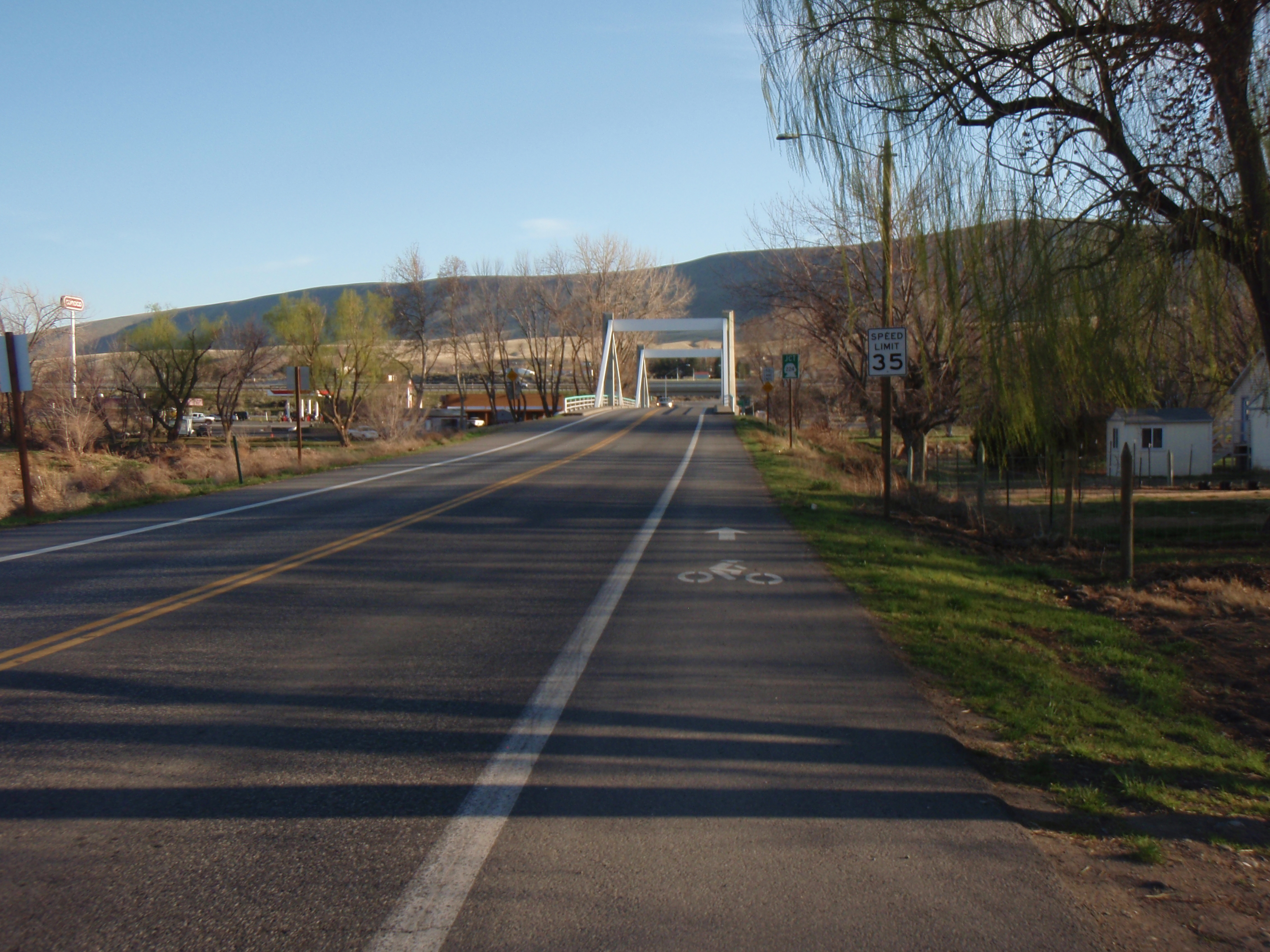
Approaching bridge from the north

=== Current span ===
The first proposals for the current bridge were submitted in November 1955, with a cost estimate of $140 thousand (equivalent to $1.2 million in 2023). The bridge was designed so that there was a clearance of 2 feet 9 inches (0.84 m) higher than the 1933 Yakima River flood level. The new bridge was to be built 600 feet (180 m) downstream from the previous bridge, but was built 300 feet (91 m) upstream instead. The second bridge had been in place for 40 years and was seeing an average of 1,700 cars-per-day over the bridge. By comparison 9,500 cars on an average 2012 day travel over the current bridge.

Everett McKellar of Chelan won the contract to build the bridge, designed by Homer M. Hadley in 1956. Hadley designed the Lacey V. Murrow Memorial Bridge across Lake Washington and the Third Lake Washington Bridge was named after him. The cost of the bridge came out at just over $196 thousand (equivalent to $1.7 million in 2023), and was opened to traffic on July 4, 1957.

The bridge is believed to be the first steel box girder bridge built in the United States.

The bridge was listed on the Washington Heritage Register on January 25, 2002.
