= Benton, Washington =

Benton, Washington may refer to:

- Benton County, A county in the U.S. state Washington
- Benton City, City in Benton County
