= Tri-City Raceway =

Motorsport track in the United States

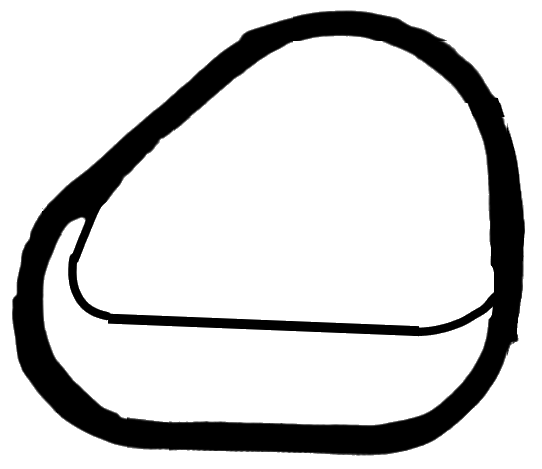
- Tri-Oval (1968–present)
- Location: 8280 West Van Giesen Street; West Richland, Washington, United States; 99353
- Coordinates: 46°16′55.2″N 119°23′34.8″W
- Owner: City of West Richland
- Operator: Friends of Red Mountain Event Center; West Richland Police Department
- Broke ground: March 11, 1968; 58 years ago
- Opened: Initial: April 28, 1968; 58 years ago Reopening: October 1, 2021; 4 years ago
- Closed: 2004; 22 years ago
- Construction cost: $250,000 USD
- Major events: Current: ARCA Menards Series West; NAPA Auto Care 150 (1968–1970, 1972, 1989–1990, 1993–1994, 2003, 2024–present); Former: NASCAR Northwest Series (1985–2004)
- Website: tricityraceway.com

Tri-Oval (1968–present)
- Surface: Asphalt
- Length: 0.500 mi (0.805 km)
- Turns: 3

Tri-City Raceway is a 0.500 mi (0.805 km) tri-oval short track in West Richland, Washington, United States. The facility has hosted a variety of events since its opening in 1968, including NASCAR and CARS Tour West events. Tri-City Raceway is owned by the city of West Richland and is operated by the Friends of Red Mountain Event Center and the West Richland Police Department.

Tri-City Raceway opened in 1968 under the ownership of the Western Sintering Company. Within the first 15 years of the track's existence, the track faced constant financial troubles and disputes with drivers despite numerous managers. In 1982, a group of four businessmen acquired the facility's lease and revitalized the track in the following years. In 1999, the facility was sold to Paul Alderman, and after a period of high-turnover with its managers, Alderman closed the facility for auto racing after 2004.

The track was acquired in 2008 by the Port of Kennewick, who planned to turn the facility into a wine-related business. However, the plans ultimately fell through, and the track was sold to the city of West Richland in 2019. With the city's purchase, multiple organizations leased out the track, including the Friends of Red Mountain Event Center, who organized the return of auto racing in 2021.

== Description ==
=== Configuration ===
Tri-City Raceway is measured at 0.5 mi (0.80 km). Unlike most short tracks, Tri-City Raceway is shaped in the form of a tri-oval, with three turns instead of the usual four.

=== Amenities ===
The track is located in West Richland, Washington, and served by Washington State Route 224. On track property, a 5-acre (2.0 ha) police station owned by the West Richland Police Department was constructed and completed in 2021.

== Track history ==
=== First opening period ===
==== Construction, first events ====
On January 11, 1968, president of the Western Sintering Company, John Rector, announced plans to build a 0.5 mi (0.80 km) tri-oval racing facility named "Tri-City Raceways". Initial plans for the facility included the tri-oval, a dirt motocross track within the tri-oval's infield, and 4,000 grandstand seats. In addition, newly-appointed track manager Jerry Wagner also announced near-future master plans, which included plans to construct a dragstrip and a sports car track layout. Groundbreaking on Tri-City Raceway occurred on March 11, and the first events were held at the track on April 28 on the tri-oval. The first events on the track's motocross circuit were held two weeks after on May 12. On August 17, the first NASCAR-sanctioned race was held at the facility's tri-oval, with Ray Elder winning a NASCAR Pacific Coast Late Model Division event. According to the Tri-City Herald, the entire facility, including land and construction costs, costed $250,000 (adjusted for inflation, $2,314,593).

==== Turbulent decades, frequent financial and organizational struggles ====
In 1969, Tri-City Raceway underwent a renovation project, which included the installation of new bleacher seats, a new press box, and improved spectator amenities. Two years later, Wagner was replaced as manager and operator of Tri-City by Raceway Industries, Inc., led by president George Cantrell. As part of Cantrell's tenure, the pit area was moved from outside the eastern portion of the track to the infield of the track, which was achieved by the removal of the motocross track. In a 1999 interview, Rector described the motocross track as "a disaster", having lost money in every event it hosted. Months into his tenure, Cantrell faced a boycott from the track's jalopy racing division drivers due to purse money disputes. The following year, A&P Sports, headed by racing driver Bill Amick, took over operational control of Tri-City Raceway. In later interviews, Amick stated that the jalopy driver boycott was a primary reason for his investment in the track. During Amick's tenure, he reported that A&P Sports lost money on operating the facility due to purse increases and renovations, leading to the eventual cutting of sportsman racing for the rest of 1972 starting in August.

By the start of 1973, A&P Sports opted out of their lease due to numerous disagreements with the organization and drivers, with sportsman racer Larry Pryor taking over operations in January. Like Amick, Pryor also stated that he lost money operating the track, and he gave up operating control to Steve Dickmann in 1976. After three years under Dickmann's operational control, local businesspeople Doug and Karen McGaughey took over operations in 1979. After facing declining car counts for races and driver disputes due to a lack of communication between the drivers and the McGaugheys, they gave up their control to former racing driver Joe Bonner in October 1979. Although Bonner was reported by the Herald to have improved the financial situation of the facility in May 1980 with increased attendance in comparison to 1979, by the end of the year, the track came under criticism from drivers due to inconsistent rules.

After the track experienced a financially "mediocre" season in 1981, Bonner gave up operating control to a group of four businessmen consisting of Gene Wagner, Wayne Walden, Jerry Harmon, and Jack Goodell for 1982 on November 1, 1981. By 1985, Herald writer Hec Hancock wrote that the operators, now consisting of Walden, Goodell, and Tom Cissell, were "winning an uphill battle to put the track in the black" with rising attendance figures and a new $60,000 scoreboard being installed within the year. In December 1998, after Walden's lease expired, the Herald reported the sale of Tri-City Raceway to Paul Alderman, a Ellensburg car dealer. Within the first year of Alderman's ownership, several renovations were made to the facility, including the installation of an improved lighting system, flattening the infield, adding power and water stations for pit stalls, and completing the track's irrigation system. In 2001, Dennis Williams became the promoter of Tri-City Raceway; he left in June 2002 due to financial problems. Five months after Williams' departure, Alderman hired Chris Lewandoski as the track's general manager. By April 2003, multiple renovations were made, including the construction of a 1/4 mi (0.40 km) track within the tri-oval and additional lighting.

=== 2004–2021 closure ===
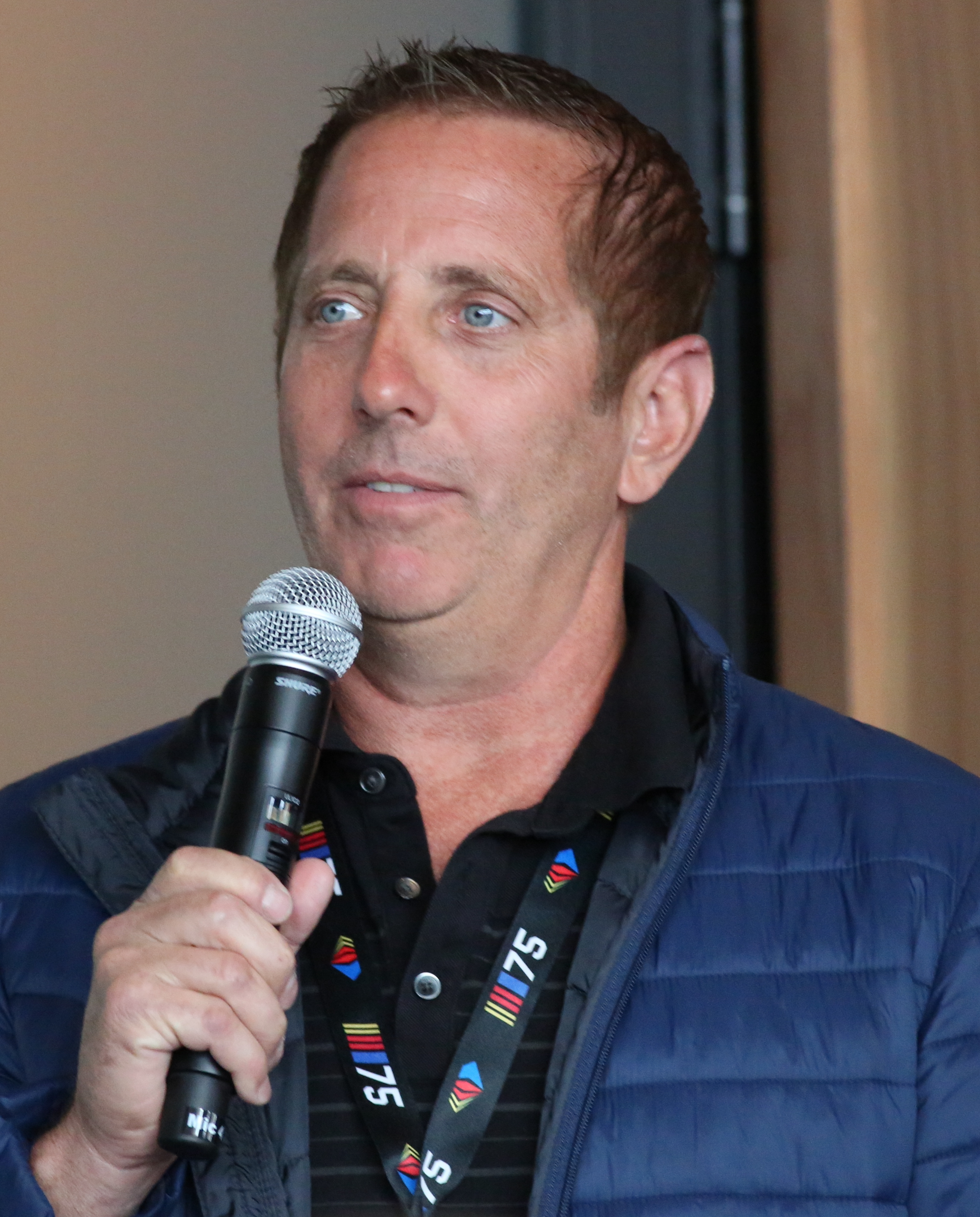
NASCAR driver and Washington native Greg Biffle (pictured in 2023) was negotiating to purchase Tri-City Raceway in the mid-2000s; however, the purchase ultimately never occurred.

By 2004, with the release of Lewandoski in July 2003 and rising costs, the number of racing weekends for Tri-City Raceway were cut from 29 to four. Alderman further stated to the Herald of the potential closure of the track if no operator could be found to run the track. The final major race under Alderman's tenure occurred on September 4 for a NASCAR Northwest Series race. In 2005, Alderman officially announced a racing hiatus for Tri-City Raceway due to a lack of viable operators for the facility; according to Alderman, he did not promote the track itself due to complications with his health. By the start of 2007, Alderman stated that he had "no real strong offers" for either the sale or purchase of the track; despite this, the track was still being maintained by employees. According to various sources, NASCAR driver and Washington native Greg Biffle was in negotiations to purchase the facility sometime in the mid-2000s. However, negotiations fell through after Biffle was "medium done" with the purchase. Biffle later stated that he had attempted to purchase the facility for four years and ultimately, did not go through due to the long distance between Biffle and the track; at the time, Biffle resided in Charlotte, North Carolina.

==== Failed Port of Kennewick redevelopment ====
In January 2008, Tri-City Raceway was officially sold to the Port of Kennewick for $1,750,000, with port officials stating plans to redevelop the facility to a wine-related business. Alderman later stated to the Herald that he sold off the facility because he "just got tired of keeping it up. At some point you have to cut your losses". Two months later, Port of Kennewick executive director Tim Arntzen announced further plans for the development, stating hopes for the city of West Richland to annex the track's 93 acres (38 ha). He later added that the facility had "great potential as a mixed-use project". By January 2015, port and city of West Richland officials stated hopes of annexing the track into West Richland to be a part of the Red Mountain wine growing area. However, development into a wine-related business was dependent on the construction of a proposed interchange on the nearby Interstate 82. In September 2019, the interchange proposal was rejected by the Federal Highway Administration after the agency determined that traffic was too light for a new interchange on the highway.

In September 2019, city of West Richland officials stated plans to purchase Tri-City Raceway to build a new police station for the city's police department. By the 25th, negotiations were mostly complete, with talks focusing on the final purchase price for the facility. The city of West Richland officially bought and annexed Tri-City Raceway in October for $1,800,000, with Port of Kennewick official Skip Novakovich stating that "the Port of Kennewick doesn’t have the time or the money to go forward with any kind of investment in this property. The city of West Richland does". Work on the police station started in February 2021 and was completed by December of the year at a cost of $12,300,000.

=== Red Mountain Event Center reopening ===
In July 2020, a group named the Friends of Red Mountain Event Center, consisting of Eric Van Winkle, Greg Walden, and Jesse Brown, announced hopes in the Herald to lease parts of the Tri-City Raceway complex to use as a multi-event center. The group included plans to host auto racing, drive-in movie nights, and car shows. The group hosted their first event, a drive-in movie night, on October 15. By the start of 2021, Herald writer Jeff Morrow proclaimed that "NASCAR-style racing could come back" to the facility within the year. In May, the West Richland City Council unanimously approved a five-year lease for the group alongside a $1.2 million renovation, which included the re-adding of grandstands and lights, renovations to the track's walls, and renovations to the track's concessions areas. Tri-City Raceway officially reopened for auto racing for practice sessions on October 1, hosting its first events on the weekend of October 2–3, hosting various events. In 2023, Walden began discussions with NASCAR executive Ken Clapp on the potential return of the now-named ARCA Menards West Series in 2025. The negotiations were successful, and after it was moved up to 2024, the return of the series occurred on August 10. In 2025, after the closure of nearby Hermiston Raceway, Walden stated plans of constructing a 1/4 mi (0.40 km) oval within the track's infield, stating that "we would be looking at it in 2026".

== Events and uses ==
=== Auto racing ===
Tri-City Raceway currently hosts events from various sanctioning series, including the regional NASCAR-sanctioned ARCA Menards West Series and the CARS Tour West under the organization's Northwest Pro Late Model division. In addition, the track formerly hosted the regional NASCAR-sanctioned NASCAR Northwest Series annually from 1985 until 2004.

=== Other events and uses ===
- On June 13, 1975, Tri-City Raceway was the site of a rock music concert that drew in a reported audience of 7,000 to 8,000 people. The concert was known for a chaotic reputation, which led to new ordinances being passed within the track's local county of Benton County to require permits and insurance for future concerts that attracted over 1,000 people.
- On August 16, 1981, Tri-City Raceway hosted a country music concert that attracted 2,000 people.
- Tri-City Raceway is the host of the Sand and Sage Sports Car Club, who run autocross events at the facility.
