= Zintel Canyon Dam =

Dam in Washington, USA

- Location: Kennewick, Benton County, Washington, USA
- Coordinates: 46°10′29″N 119°11′01″W
- Construction began: March 1992
- Opening date: December 1992
- Operator(s): U.S. Army Corps of Engineers (Operator)

Dam and spillways
- Impounds: Zintel Canyon
- Height: 90 feet (27 m)
- Length: 520 feet (160 m)

Zintel Canyon Dam is a dam spanning Zintel Canyon on the south side of Kennewick in the U.S. state of Washington. The structure was constructed in 1992 to block a water body that runs dry most of the year. The watershed above the dam is approximately 18 square miles (47 km^{2}) comprising a semi-arid region of the Horse Heaven Hills. The dam was built to protect portions of Kennewick from a 100-year flood scenario. While rare, water has been observed behind the dam in the past.

Despite the low precipitation in the area, summertime thunderstorms can stall in the hills and send a flash flood down the canyon. A more minor threat comes from rapid snowmelt in the hills above the dam. Small floods from these events have filled Kennewick's Rainier Street seven times before construction of the dam.

A project that was underway to improve Kennewick's water supply in 2014 caused erosion on public land near the Washington State Patrol office near the dam. This resulted in an accumulation of silt at the base of the back side of the structure. This project will allow the city to store water in an aquifer in the Southridge area, lowering the amount of water the city pulls out of the Columbia River.

The maximum reservoir capacity behind the dam is 1260 acre-feet.

== See also ==
- Amon Creek
- List of dams in the Columbia River watershed
