= Amon Creek =

Stream in Washington, United States

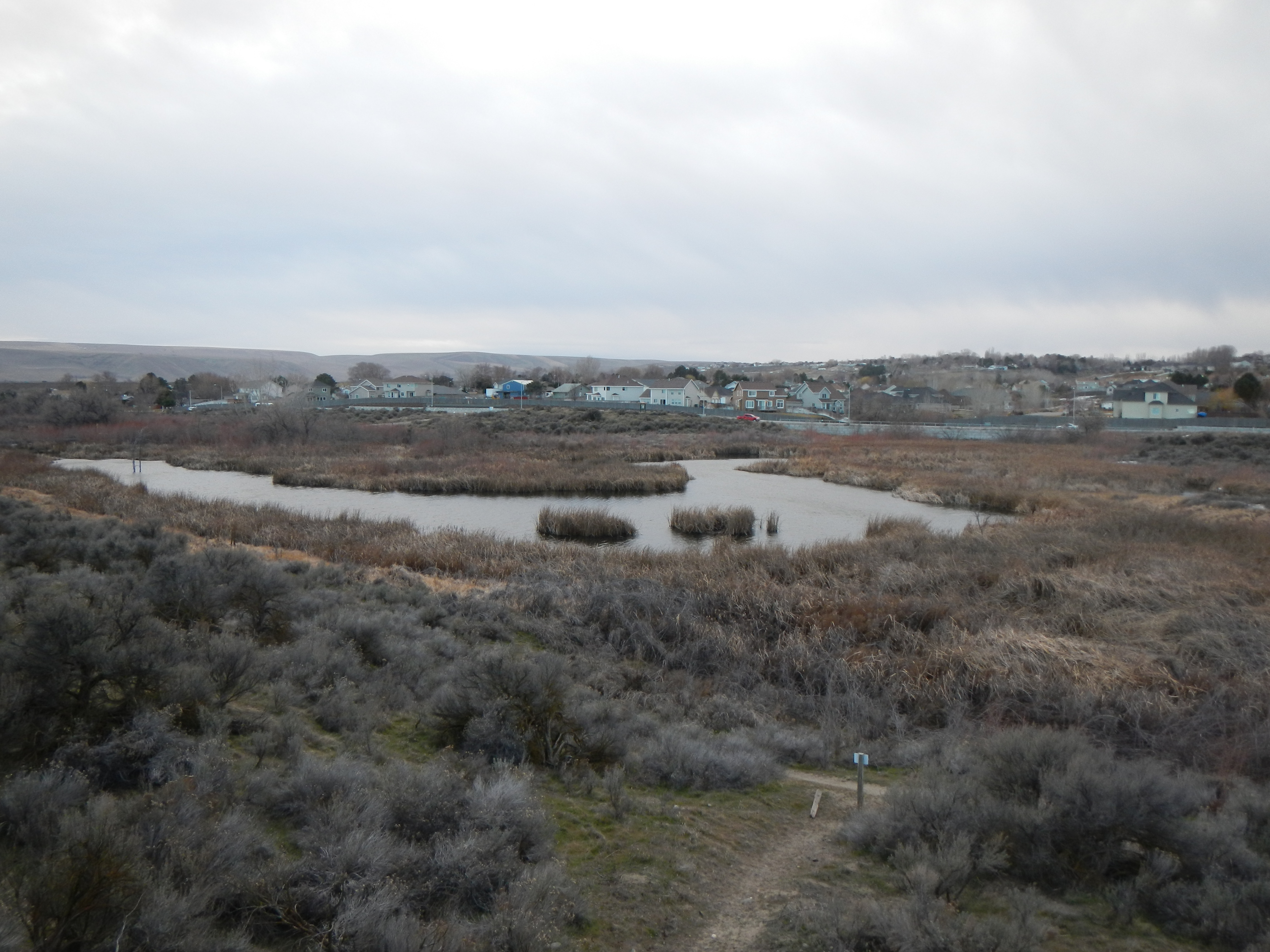
- The West Fork of Amon Creek in Richland

- Location of the mouth of Amon Creek in Washington Amon Creek (Washington (state))

Location
- Country: United States
- State: Washington
- Cities: Kennewick, Richland

Physical characteristics
- Source
  - location: Rural Benton County, Washington, United States
  - coordinates: 46°05′48″N 119°16′02″W
  - elevation: 1,688 ft (515 m)
- Mouth: Yakima River
  - location: Richland, Benton County, Washington, United States
  - coordinates: 46°14′50″N 119°15′41″W
  - elevation: 351 ft (107 m)
- Length: 13 mi (21 km) Length measured from the East Fork Source to Mouth at the Yakima River.
- Basin size: 62.24 sq mi (161.2 km^{2})
- Discharge
  - location: Mouth
  - average: 54 cu ft/s (1.5 m^{3}/s)

Basin features
- Tributaries
  - left: West Fork Amon Creek
  - right: East Fork Amon Creek

Amon Creek is the largest tributary of the Lower Yakima River in Benton County, Washington. From the source of its East Fork to its mouth at the Yakima, it flows about 13 miles (21 km), passing through Kennewick and Richland. The East Fork as well as the main course north of where both forks come together flow south to north. The West Fork starts in Badger Canyon by heading south, but slowly wraps around along with the topography of the canyon to flow out of it northbound. There is an easily visible riparian zone along most of the length of the main course, along with the West Fork up Badger Canyon and the East Fork until I-82.

== Course ==
The entire course of Amon Creek, as well as its two forks, is within Benton County. The creek flows through the semi-arid climate in the rain shadow of the Cascade mountains. Because of this, the creek serves an important role as an oasis, especially outside of developed areas.

The flow in the West Fork mainly comes from springs in and around Badger Canyon whereas the flow in the East Fork is primarily runoff from nearby irrigation canals.

=== Main course ===
The East and West Forks of Amon Creek come together at the Meadow Springs Country Club in Richland. It then flows north in a canyon through residential portions of Richland. After passing under Columbia Park Trail, the creek enters the dense forest of the Yakima River Delta before ending at the Yakima River a mile from where it meets the Columbia. Only about 1% of the discharge into the Yakima River is natural.

=== West Fork ===
The West Fork of Amon Creek rises in Badger Canyon southwest of Richland. It flows through the canyon parallel to Badger Road until near Cottonwood Elementary School, where it breaks away and flows under Interstate 82 to the west of Badger Road. From there it flows through the Amon Creek Natural Preserve. After that it flows into the Meadow Springs Country Club where it meets the East Fork.

=== East Fork ===
The East Fork of Amon Creek rises in the Horse Heaven Hills south of Kennewick and typically only flows when the irrigation canals are full. Above Interstate 82, the East Fork is usually dry except in times of heavy snow melt or rainfall. After passing under I-82 and entering Kennewick, the East Fork is largely used as a wasteway for canals operated by the Kennewick Irrigation District (KID). It then flows past orchards, under Clearwater Avenue, briefly through Amon Basin, and enters the Meadow Springs Country Club.

== Amon Basin ==
Amon Basin
- Floor elevation: 500 feet (200 m)
- Length: 1.1 miles (1.8 km)
- Width: 0.5 miles (0.8 km)

Geography
- Rivers: Amon Creek
- Interactive map of Amon Basin

Amon Basin is a bowl-shaped area upstream of the Meadow Springs Country Club which holds both the West Fork and the East Fork of Amon Creek. While the two forks pass within about a third of a mile of each other, their confluence is about a mile upstream.

The Amon Basin has unique ecological significance to the area, especially in the wetlands along the West Fork where several different kinds of animals can be seen. Outside of the riparian zone, one finds sagebrush as well as animal life that is typical of the Columbia Basin.

The basin extends further south along the West Fork than it does along the East Fork.

== Recreation ==
There are several recreational opportunities along the length of the creek. South of Thompson Hill, many people make use of small two-track roads that cross the East Fork for off-roading. On the West Fork just north of I-82, there is the Amon Creek Nature Preserve in Amon Basin which includes several trails for hiking and observing the wildlife. The confluence of the two forks is in the Meadow Springs Country Club, which is an 18-hole golf course. At the mouth of the creek in the Yakima River Delta there is a dense forest administered by the USACE which holds many trails for hiking and mountain biking.

Bird watching is also popular along the entire length of the creek as many migrant birds utilize the ecosystem around the creek while they are in the Columbia Basin.

== Wildlife ==
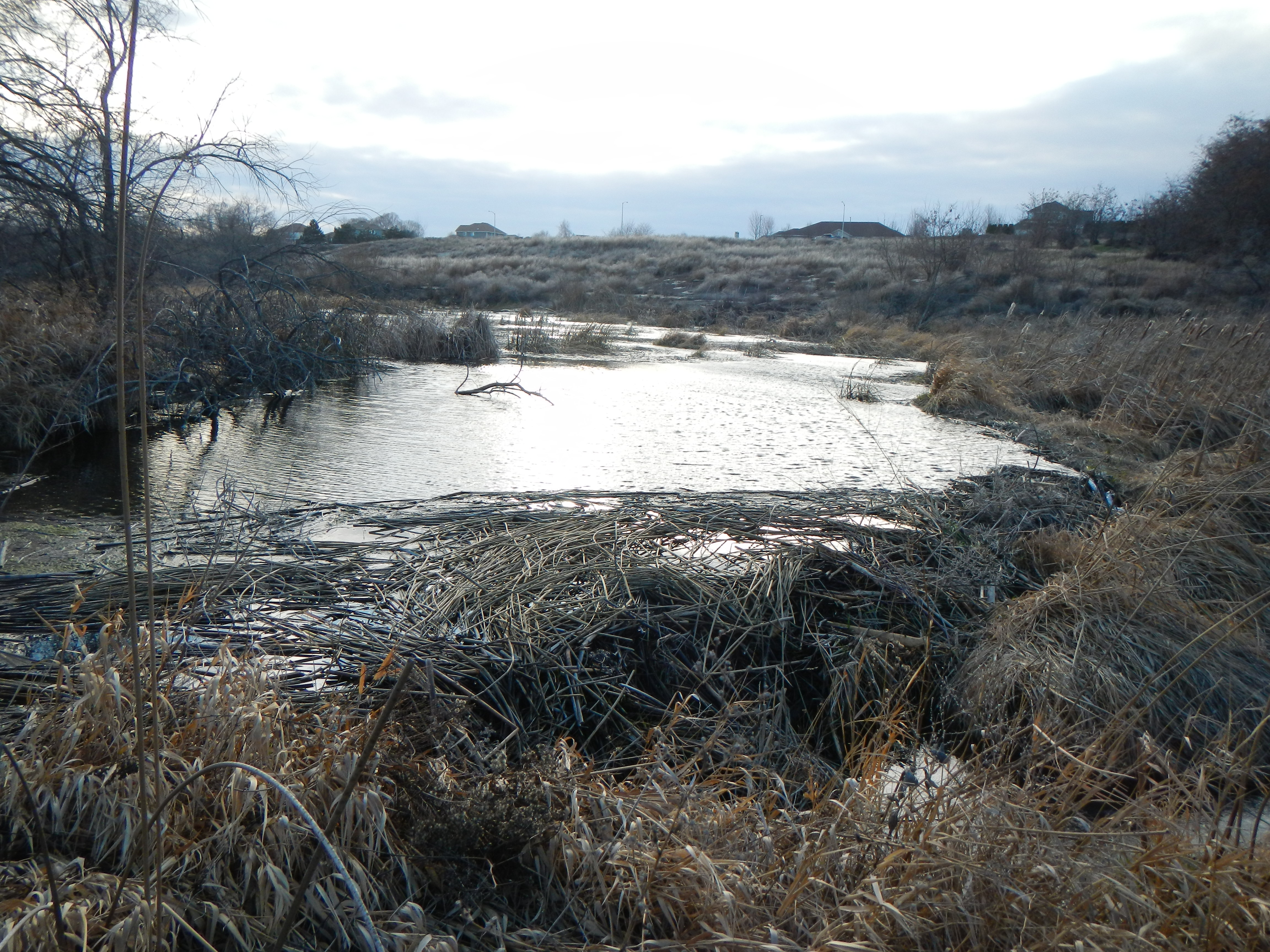
A beaver dam on the West Fork of Amon Creek in Amon Basin

Below Meadow Springs Country Club, several fish species have been spotted. In some years, these can include salmon and trout, however summer water temperatures, which can exceed 74 °F (23 °C), can be lethal to fish populations. The creek also serves as an oasis with heightened amounts of vegetation around it. The basin around the creek serves as a home to hares, quail and beavers. River otters have been spotted in the creek.

In Amon Basin, there are about a half dozen beaver dams which form small ponds along the length of the creek in that area.

It is believed that fish hatcheries run by the Yakama Nation have contributed to the fish population in the creek.

== History ==
Around 8 million years ago, as the Cascade Mountains were starting to rise, the Columbia River changed its course to flow through what is now Wallula Gap. The Yakima River then formed and flowed through Badger Canyon and the Amon Basin, which were carved by the Columbia. Around 10,000 years ago, the Missoula Floods further altered the landscape, opening up the Horn Rapids area for the Yakima River to flow through. The West Fork now utilizes the canyons left by the Yakima and Columbia Rivers.

In 1970, the West Fork was altered to provide irrigation to the new Meadow Springs Country Club. They built four reservoirs connected by culverts. This made fish passage through the golf course on the West Fork nearly impossible. The East Fork was left in its natural state. Conditions on the West Fork further worsened in 1998 when a KID canal broke, causing release of sediment with the floodwater. Though the floodplain upstream of the golf course served its purpose well, the upper two reservoirs were filled with four feet of sediment, decreasing the depth to between 12 and 18 inches (30 to 46 cm). This starkly raised temperatures in the creek.

In 2008, over 16 tons of illegally dumped trash were removed from the newly established Amon Creek Nature Preserve along the West Fork directly upstream of the golf course. Volunteers also removed 14 broken-down vehicles.

== See also ==
- Zintel Canyon Dam
