= Yakima River Delta =

River delta in Washington, United States

Coordinates: 46.2497°N 119.2528°W

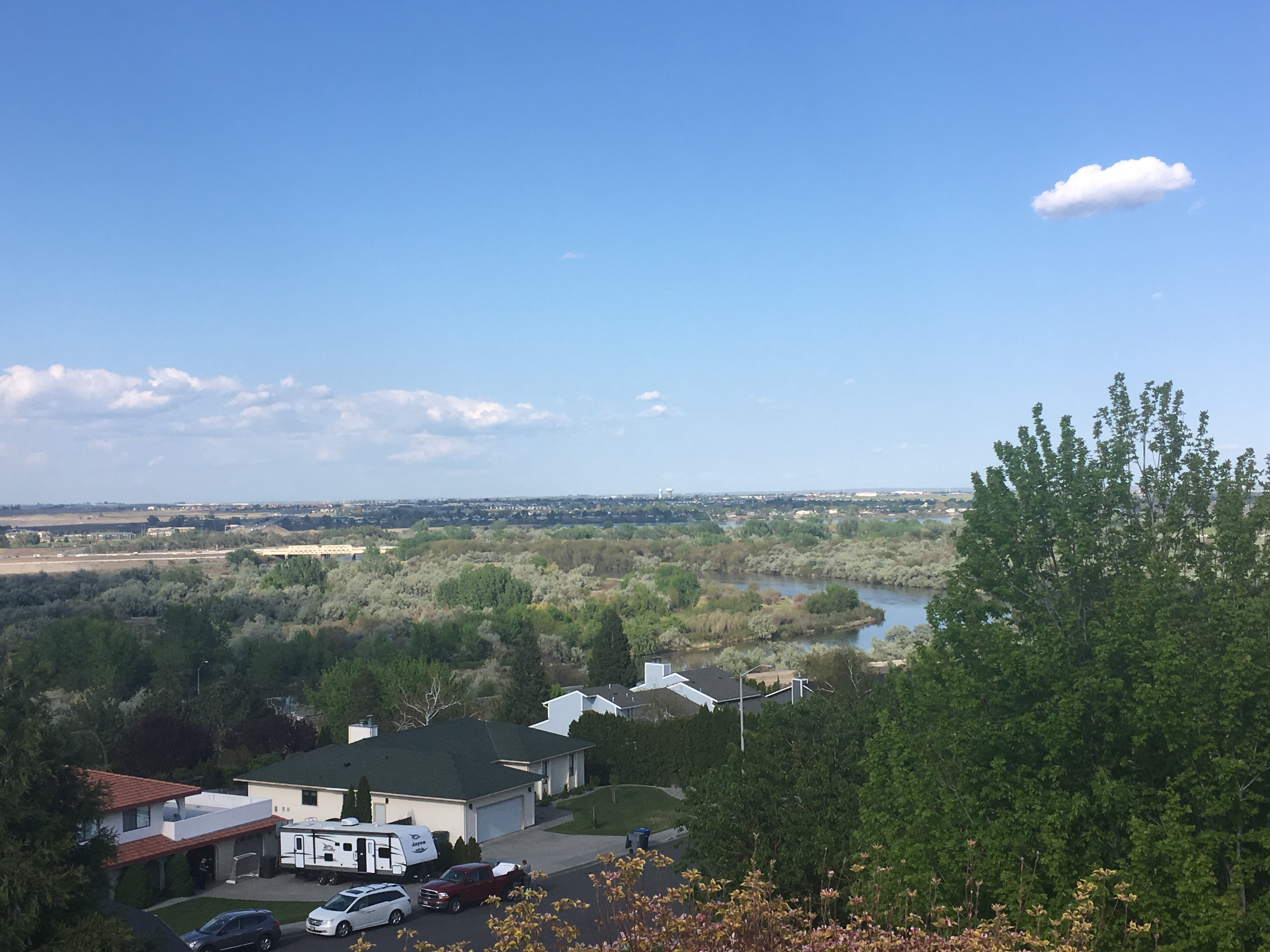
A portion of the Yakima Delta as seen from the south.

The Yakima River Delta is an area of land in Richland, Washington where the Yakima River enters the Columbia River at River Mile 335. It hosts several protected areas and is crossed by State Route 240. This area is mostly floodplain with riparian-type growth, including non-native species such as Russian olive. Amon Creek enters the Yakima River in this area.

The area is used extensively for recreational purposes, such as kayaking and hiking. The Sacagawea Heritage Trail, a bike path traveling through all three cities in the Tri-Cities, crosses the delta alongside State Route 240.

The delta is generally bounded by Columbia Park Trail to the south and Interstate 182 to the north. A small portion of extends to the north of I-182 between Queensgate Drive and the Bypass Highway toward the site of the Duportail Bridge. The portion to the east of State Route 240 is dotted by numerous islands, and Bateman Island lies immediately to the east.

== Protected Areas ==
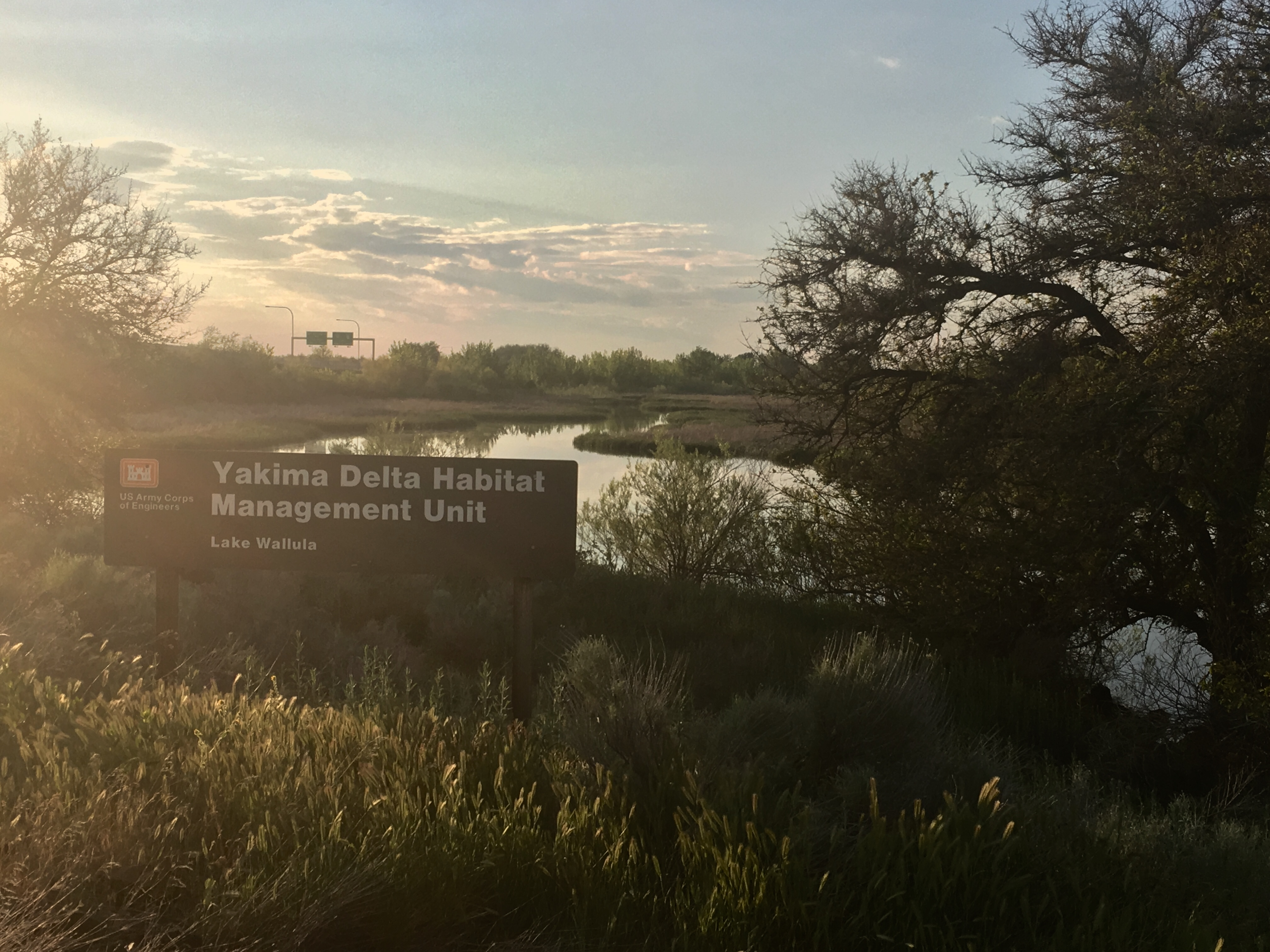
Signage for the Yakima Delta Wildlife Management Unit.

Most of the delta is located within protected areas. The entirety of the south side of the Yakima River, as well as a portion on the west side of the river to the north of I-182, are contained within the Yakima Delta Wildlife Management Unit which is owned by the U.S. Army Corps of Engineers. The Unit encompasses approximately 300 acres (120 ha). The portion of the delta directly south of Columbia Point is also within the unit.

To the north of the river west of State Route 240 is the 276-acre (112 ha) Chamna Natural Preserve, which is owned by the city but jointly maintained by the Tapteal Greenway. The preserve is home to 11 miles (18 km) of hiking trails with interpretive signage to provide visitors with descriptions of the plants and wildlife that can be found within its boundaries. Chamna was the name of a nearby Native American village.

Both sections are day-use areas where camping and hunting are prohibited.

== Ecology ==
Despite being positioned within an arid climate, the delta provides habitat to a wide variety of plant and animal life. Numerous birds frequent the area, including more unusual species such as marbled godwit and red phalarope. Salmon are an important species that inhabit the waters, which are controlled by the McNary Dam near Umatilla, Oregon. The dense riparian forest adjacent to more desert plant life make it susceptible to wildfires, one of which occurred in 2011. Current threats to the ecology of the area include recreational overuse and invasive species.

=== Restoration ===
Several agencies have worked to restore the ecology of the river delta in recent years with other projects in their planning stages. Repeated efforts to control invasive species are conducted by the Benton County Conservation District and Noxious Weed Control Board. These efforts are to control common reeds, which tend to group together choking out native plants. Beyond this, they create a habitat for mosquitos, which then create a public health hazard. The Tapteal Greenway and City of Richland removed 16 tons of garbage from the Chamna Natural Preserve.

The construction of the causeway connecting Bateman Island to the shore around 1940 dammed water that previously flowed between the island and the shore, causing temperatures to sharply increase in the water to the west of the island. This water temperature provides an ideal habitat for exotic species to feed on juvenile salmon in the spring. The causeway also blocks adult salmon heading upstream from entering the Yakima River as they had done before it was built. Restoring the natural flow on the south side of the island, along with other restoration projects throughout the Lower Yakima Basin could provide billions of dollars to the economy.
