= Horn Rapids Dam =

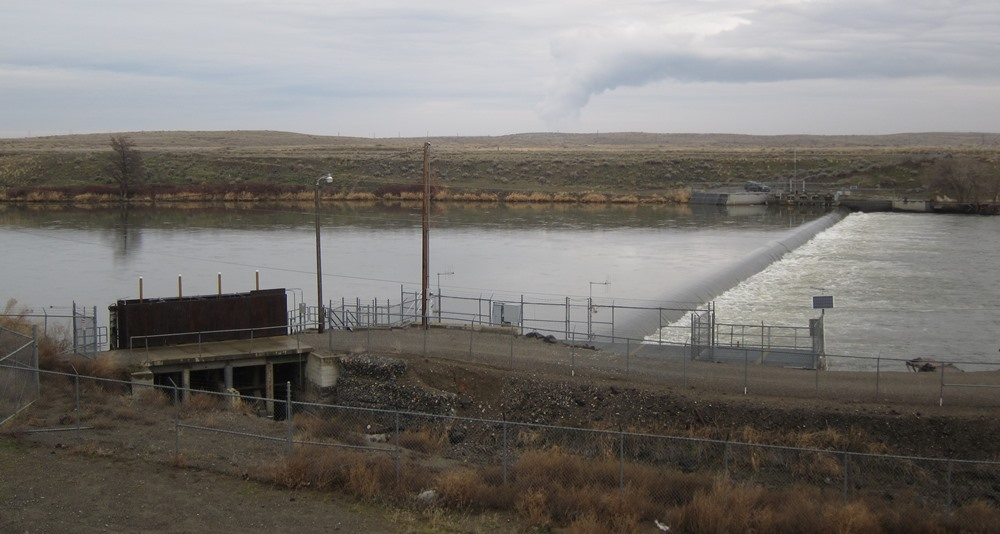
- Wannawish Dam with south canal in foreground
- Interactive map of Horn Rapids Dam
- Location: Benton County, Washington
- Coordinates: 46°22′43″N 119°25′01″W
- Opening date: 1892

Dam and spillways
- Impounds: Yakima River
- Height: 12 ft (3.7 m)
- Length: 520 ft (160 m)

Horn Rapids Dam (also known as Wanawish Dam) is a concrete barrage dam on the Yakima River in Benton County, Washington near the intersection of SR 240 and SR 225. The dam is not used for hydroelectric production, rather to fill irrigation canals on either bank of the river.

Permits for the dam were filed by the Yakima Irrigation and Improvement Company in 1889, and the original dam was completed in 1892. When the company went under in 1896, the dam was bought by the Northwestern Pacific Company (a subsidiary of Northern Pacific). A more substantial rock-filled timber crib dam was put in place in 1908, when the northern irrigation canal was built. The dam was damaged in a flood in 1996, but was replaced by a concrete structure in 1997.

Former Camp Columbia (occasionally referred to as Columbia Camp) was located on the north bank of the river just above the dam. This was a prison camp during World War II for low-security prisoners; political dissidents and the like. The camp was operated from 1944 through 1947. There were barracks and a large orchard, but no perimeter fences, and inmates were allowed to move about freely.

The dam is still used as a historic fishing location by the Yakama Indian Nation, and traditional fishing scaffolds can be seen there year-round.

== See also ==
- List of dams in the Columbia River watershed
