= West Richland, Washington =

- City
- City of West Richland
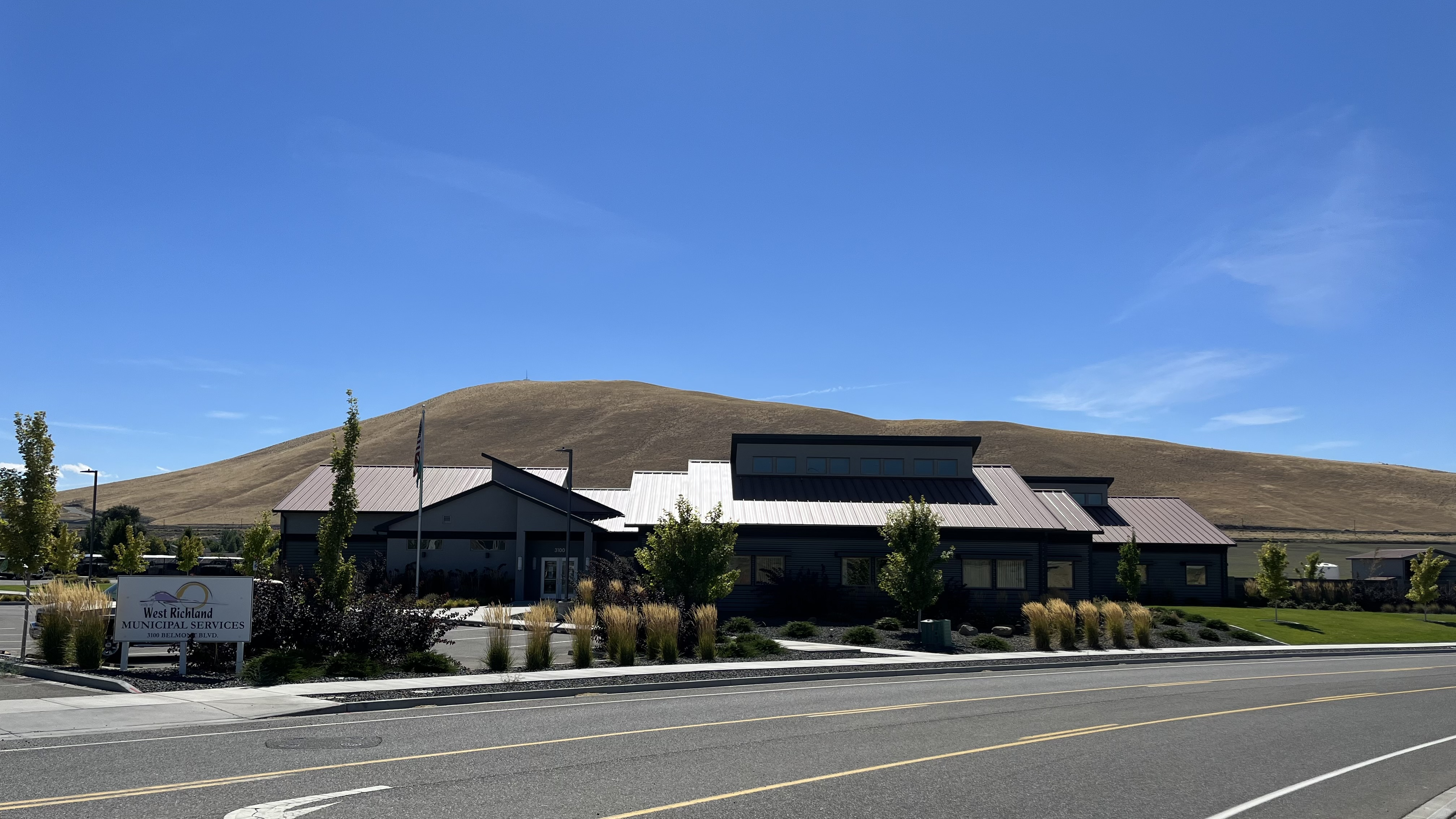
- West Richland's City Hall complex on Belmont Blvd.

- Location of West Richland, Washington
- Coordinates: 46°18′1″N 119°20′50″W
- Country: United States
- State: Washington
- County: Benton
- Incorporated: June 13, 1955

Government
  - Type: Mayor–council
  - Mayor: Fred Brink

Area
  - Total: 22.28 sq mi (57.71 km^{2})
  - Land: 22.12 sq mi (57.28 km^{2})
  - Water: 0.17 sq mi (0.43 km^{2})
- Elevation: 449 ft (137 m)

Population (2020)
  - Total: 16,295
  - Estimate (2023): 18,456
  - Density: 736.8/sq mi (284.5/km^{2})
- Time zone: UTC-8 (Pacific (PST))
  - Summer (DST): UTC-7 (PDT)
- ZIP codes: 99352-99353
- Area code: 509
- 5377665: 53-77665
- Website: westrichland.org

West Richland is a city in Benton County, Washington. The population was 16,295 at the time of the 2020 census. The city is part of the Tri-Cities metropolitan area, whose principal cities (the Tri-Cities) are Richland, Kennewick, and Pasco.

== History ==
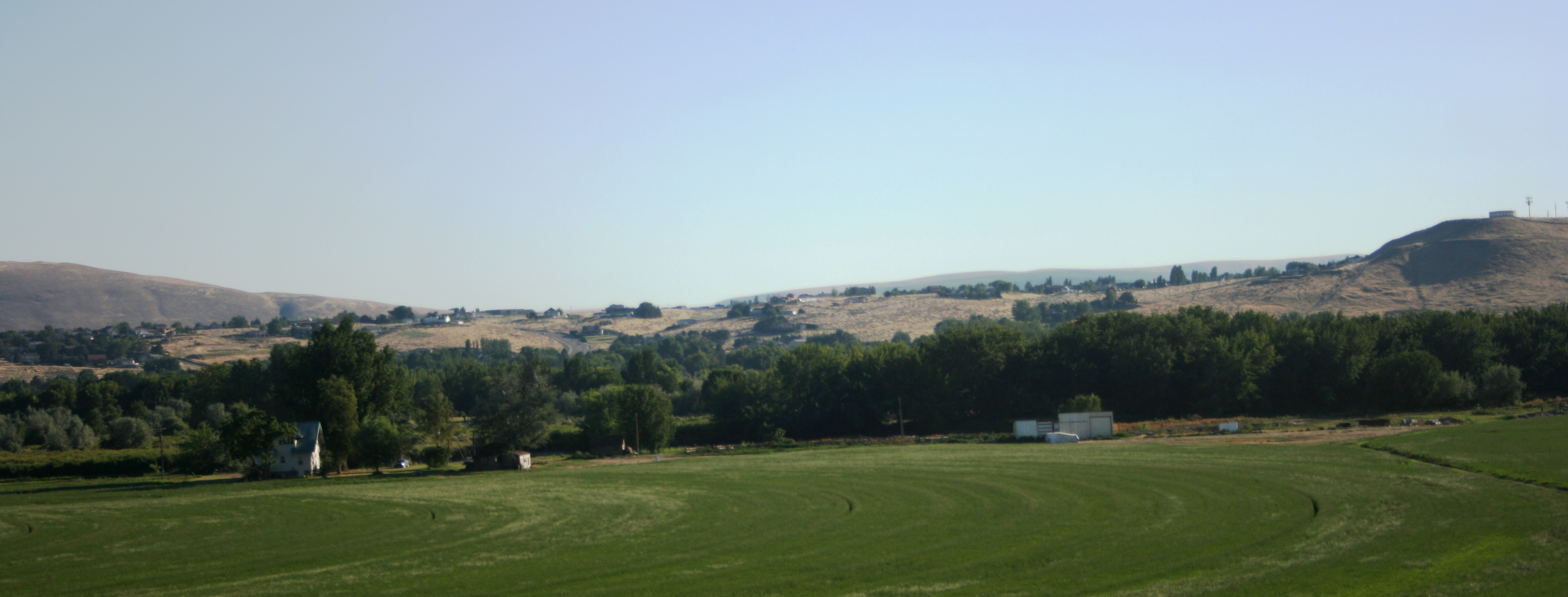
West Richland as seen across Yakima from Richland.

The original people of the region were the Chemnapum Indians (closely related to the Wanapum tribe), living near the mouth of the Yakima River. Lewis and Clark passed through the area in 1805, and an expedition of the Army Corps of Topographical Engineers headed by Robert E Johnson mapped the Yakima Valley in 1841.

In 1853, a road was authorized by Congress to pass through the Yakima Valley, and passed through present-day West Richland; however, settlement did not properly begin until the late 1870s. The first schoolhouse was built in 1896 on the Van Horn Property just south of what is now Van Giesen Street. Benton County was created in 1905, Richland was incorporated in 1906, and the West Richland area was known as 'Lower Yakima'.

An irrigation canal from the north side of Horn Rapids Dam was built in 1908 to bring water into Richland.

The Yellowstone Trail, a national highway stretching from Albany, New York, to Seattle, was located through the Yakima Valley in 1917 and 1918. It crossed the Fallon Bridge between Richland and West Richland and then proceeded directly west to Kiona.

During the 1940s, the city of Richland was built, run and maintained by the War Department for the duration of the Manhattan Project. A number of residents had chafed at the government's regulations, and as a result many of them had moved across the Yakima River, where it was possible to purchase land and own (rather than rent) a house.

Carl Heminger purchased some 80 acres (320,000 m^{2}) in 1948, and laid out plans for a city. It was proposed that it be named Heminger City (presumably after himself), but in 1949 the townspeople chose the name Enterprise instead. Heminger moved a mile down the road in protest, and platted a small community there called Heminger City. This was eventually incorporated in the West Richland City limits. When the time came in 1955 to incorporate the town, it was decided to rename to West Richland, taking advantage of the already well-known status of nearby Richland. West Richland was officially incorporated on June 17, 1955, combining the two towns of Heminger City and Enterprise.

In 2008, West Richland was the location of the speed test for the fastest production car in the world (the Aero SSC TT) at over 250 mph (400 km/h).

The city annexed the Lewis and Clark Ranch, a 7,600-acre (3,100 ha) property along the Yakima River in 1981. Plans to develop a planned community with up to 34,000 homes were released in 2025.

== Geography ==
According to the United States Census Bureau, the city has a total area of 22.12 square miles (57.29 km^{2}), of which, 21.92 square miles (56.77 km^{2}) is land and 0.20 square miles (0.52 km^{2}) is water.

=== Climate ===
According to the Köppen Climate Classification system, West Richland has a semi-arid climate, abbreviated "BSk" on climate maps, falling slightly short of being classified as a desert climate.

Climate data for West Richland, Washington
Month	Jan	Feb	Mar	Apr	May	Jun	Jul	Aug	Sep	Oct	Nov	Dec	Year
Mean daily maximum °C (°F)	4 (39)	8 (47)	14 (57)	18 (65)	22 (72)	26 (79)	30 (86)	29 (85)	25 (77)	18 (64)	9 (48)	3 (38)	17 (63)
Mean daily minimum °C (°F)	−3 (26)	−2 (29)	1 (33)	3 (38)	7 (44)	11 (51)	13 (55)	13 (55)	9 (48)	4 (39)	0 (32)	−3 (26)	4 (40)
Average precipitation mm (inches)	28 (1.1)	23 (0.9)	20 (0.8)	20 (0.8)	18 (0.7)	15 (0.6)	7.6 (0.3)	7.6 (0.3)	10 (0.4)	15 (0.6)	28 (1.1)	33 (1.3)	230 (8.9)
Source: Weatherbase

== Demographics ==
Historical population
Census	Pop.	Note	%±
1960	1,347		—
1970	1,107		−17.8%
1980	2,938		165.4%
1990	3,962		34.9%
2000	8,385		111.6%
2010	11,811		40.9%
2020	16,295		38.0%
2023 (est.)	18,456		13.3%
U.S. Decennial Census 2020

The U.S. Census Bureau estimated the population of West Richland to be 18,456 residents in 2023. The median income for a household in the city was estimated to be $102,974 and the per capita income was $36,735; about 7% of persons were below the poverty line. There were 933 veterans in the city and 6.2% of the population was foreign born.

=== 2020 census ===
As of the 2020 census, West Richland had a population of 16,295. The population density was 731.4 inhabitants per square mile (282.4/km^{2}). The median age was 36.4 years. 28.6% of residents were under the age of 18 and 12.6% of residents were 65 years of age or older. For every 100 females there were 99.6 males, and for every 100 females age 18 and over there were 97.9 males age 18 and over.

96.9% of residents lived in urban areas, while 3.1% lived in rural areas.

There were 5,628 households in West Richland, of which 41.3% had children under the age of 18 living in them. Of all households, 62.9% were married-couple households, 13.6% were households with a male householder and no spouse or partner present, and 17.1% were households with a female householder and no spouse or partner present. About 17.2% of all households were made up of individuals and 6.6% had someone living alone who was 65 years of age or older.

There were 5,773 housing units, of which 2.5% were vacant. The homeowner vacancy rate was 0.9% and the rental vacancy rate was 5.0%.

Racial composition as of the 2020 census
Race	Number	Percent
White	13,086	80.3%
Black or African American	138	0.8%
American Indian and Alaska Native	118	0.7%
Asian	354	2.2%
Native Hawaiian and Other Pacific Islander	15	0.1%
Some other race	951	5.8%
Two or more races	1,633	10.0%
Hispanic or Latino (of any race)	2,233	13.7%

=== 2010 census ===
As of the 2010 census, there were 11,811 people, 4,145 households, and 3,253 families living in the city. The population density was 538.8 inhabitants per square mile (208.0/km^{2}). There were 4,298 housing units at an average density of 196.1 per square mile (75.7/km^{2}). The racial makeup of the city was 90.3% White, 0.8% African American, 1.2% Native American, 1.9% Asian, 0.2% Pacific Islander, 2.4% from other races, and 3.2% from two or more races. Hispanic or Latino of any race were 7.1% of the population.

There were 4,145 households, of which 43.1% had children under the age of 18 living with them, 65.7% were married couples living together, 8.7% had a female householder with no husband present, 4.1% had a male householder with no wife present, and 21.5% were non-families. 17.0% of all households were made up of individuals, and 4.5% had someone living alone who was 65 years of age or older. The average household size was 2.85 and the average family size was 3.22.

The median age in the city was 35.4 years. 29.6% of residents were under the age of 18; 7% were between the ages of 18 and 24; 27.7% were from 25 to 44; 27.5% were from 45 to 64; and 8.3% were 65 years of age or older. The gender makeup of the city was 50.5% male and 49.5% female.

== Culture ==
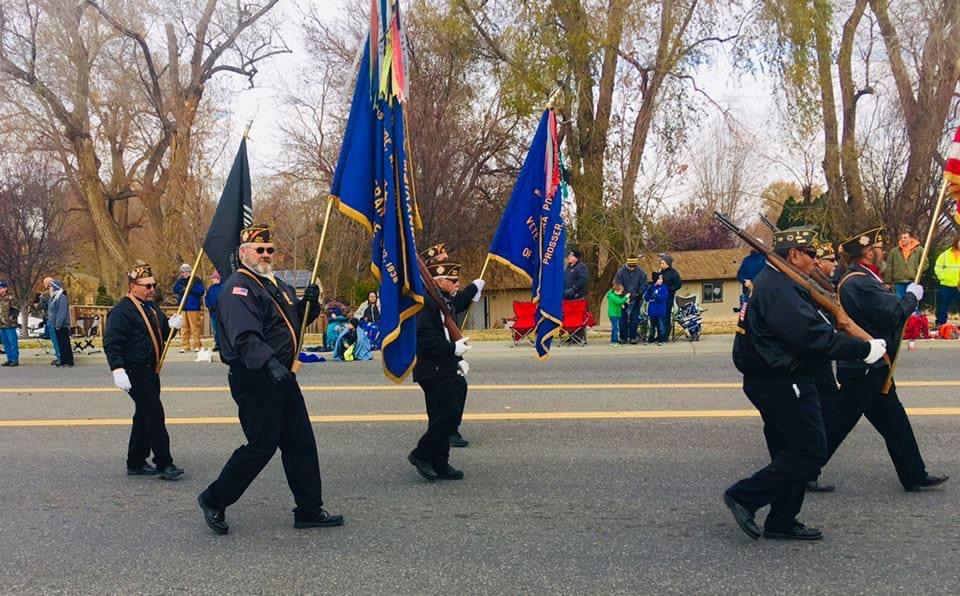
The 2018 West Richland Veteran's Day Parade.

The City of West Richland has held a Veteran's Day Parade annually since 1999. It is one of only three cities in Washington, as well as the only Washington city east of the Cascade Mountain Range, which has regional site designation from the United States Department of Veterans Affairs. The parade has grown over decades. As of 2023, it boasts an attendance of over 3,000 people, as well as more than 1,000 participants and over 100 parade entries.

The Tri-City Raceway is a half-mile oval racetrack opened in 1968 that currently ARCA Menards Series West and CARS Tour West stock car races.

== Economy ==
- SSC North America, an automobile manufacturer credited with creating the former fastest production car in the world, the SSC Aero.

== Government ==
West Richland has a mayor–council government, which differs from the council–manager system used by other cities in the Tri-Cities area. The city council has seven members who are elected at-large to four-year terms. The mayor is an elected, full-time position; since 2026, former councilmember Fred Brink has served in the position.

== Notable people ==
- Ryan Kennelly, world record geared bench-press holder (1075 lbs, 489 kg).
- Rachel Willis-Sørensen, opera singer
