= Kiona, Washington =

Unincorporated community in Washington, United States

Kiona
- Unincorporated community
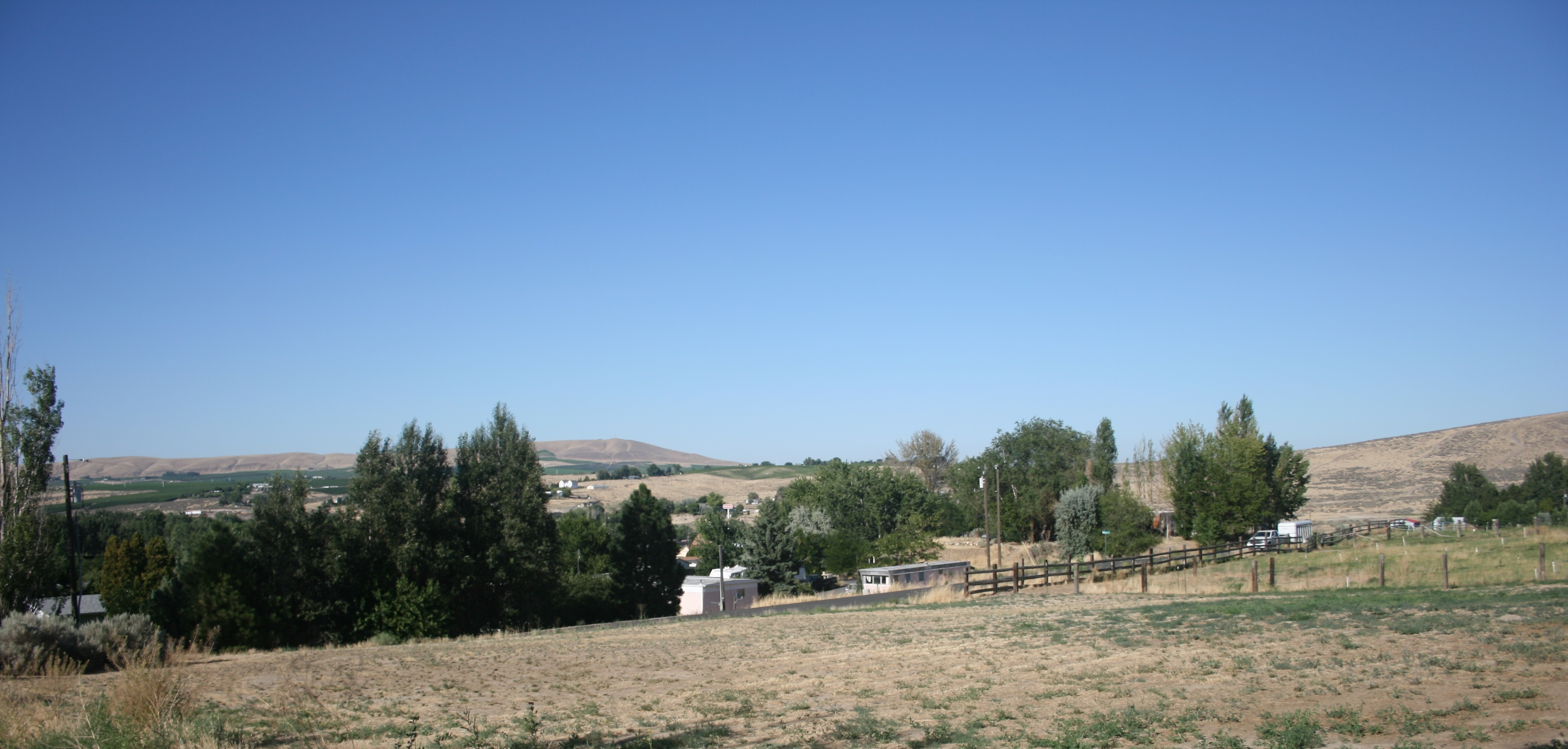
- Kiona, Washington looking east-north-east toward Red Mountain in the distance.

- Location within Benton County, Washington
- Coordinates: 46°14′59″N 119°28′42″W
- Country: United States
- State: Washington
- County: Benton
- Elevation: 518 ft (158 m)
- Time zone: UTC-8 (Pacific (PST))
  - Summer (DST): UTC-7 (PDT)
- ZIP codes: 99320
- Area code: 509
- GNIS feature ID: 1512351

Kiona is an unincorporated community in Benton County, Washington, United States. Kiona is a term belonging to North American indigenous people meaning "brown hills." Kiona and Benton City share a school district (commonly called "Ki-Be").

== History ==
In 1888, the Northern Pacific Railroad built a new station in the western part of Benton County at present-day Kiona. This allowed farmers to easily bring their produce to market (the main crops were corn, wheat, alfalfa, potatoes, and fruit, especially apples), which encouraged further settlement in the area.

Due to the sparse precipitation in the area, most agriculture at the time was dryland farming. Irrigation first came to the county in the 1890s and brought many changes. In the 1890s the Yakima Irrigation and Improvement Company built a canal bringing water from the Yakima River to Kiona.

The Oregon-Washington Railroad and Navigation Company built a new railroad across the Yakima River from Kiona in 1907. The new community of Benton City sprang up around it. Beginning in 1917, the Yellowstone Trail, a national highway from Massachusetts to Seattle, was routed through Kiona.

Kiona has never been officially incorporated as a city.

In 2002, the Benton City – Kiona Bridge over the Yakima River at Benton City was added to the National Register of Historic Places.
