= Kiona-Benton City School District =

School district in Washington

The Kiona-Benton City School District is a public school district in Benton County, Washington.

== Schools ==
The Ki-Be School District, as it is informally known, includes three schools

=== Kiona-Benton Elementary School ===
- mascot - Teddy Bears

=== Kiona-Benton Middle School ===
- mascot - Cubs
- colors - Black, White and Blue

=== Kiona-Benton High School 1A School ===
- mascot - Bears
- colors - Blue, Black, and White
- accent - Since 2009 black
- publications - The Bear (the school's annual yearbook)

== Sports ==
=== Sports for Elementary School ===
Grades K-5th have access to multiple athletic programs.

- Grid Kids Football
- Little Guy Wrestling (Boys and Girls)
- AAU Basketball (Boys and Girls)
- Little League Baseball
- Softball
- Youth Soccer (Boys and Girls)

=== Sports for Middle School ===
- Football
- Volleyball
- Cross Country (joined with high school)
- Wrestling (Boys and Girls)
- Basketball (Boys and Girls)
- Baseball
- Softball
- Soccer (Boys and Girls)
- Track and Field

=== Sports for High School ===
- Football
- Volleyball
- Cross-country
- Basketball (Boys and Girls)
- Wrestling (Boys and Girls)
- Baseball
- Softball
- Soccer (Boys and Girls)
- Track and Field
- Tennis
- Cheerleading

== Performing arts ==
The school district is currently working on building up respectable programs for Band, Choir, and Drama. As of 2009-2010, KBSD offers Band for 5th grade-8th grade, and Choir for 7th and 8th grade at the Middle School. At the High School, the offerings expand. KBHS currently has one Band, 3 Choirs (Mixed Choir known as "The Ursa Major Chorus", Treble Choir, an a cappella group known as "The Royales"), and Drama classes. The Drama club also offers students the opportunity to perform in full production plays.

== Clubs ==
The high school clubs:

- FFA
- FBLA
- Teen Read Club
- Art Club
- Science Bowl
- TSA
- FCCLA
- Buddy Club
- Knowledge Bowl
- Yearbook

== Yearly Activities ==
Throughout the year the students enjoy "Breaking-down-the-walls," an activity in which students get to know their schoolmates. In Fall the teenagers' favorite events are Homecoming, the Veterans Day Assembly, Spirit Week and Halloween. Winter activities include Christmas. Spring activities are Prom, Senior Skip-day (the last day of school for seniors) and Spring Break. Camp Wooten is highly enjoyed and eagerly waited for by the 6th graders.

== Alumni ==
- James Otto
