= Tri-City Railroad =

Overview
- Headquarters: Kennewick, Washington
- Reporting mark: TCRY
- Locale: Tri-Cities, Washington
- Dates of operation: 1999–2022

Technical
- Track gauge: 4 ft 8 1/2 in (1,435 mm) standard gauge

Other
- Website: http://www.tcry.com

The Tri-City Railroad (TCRY) was a privately owned Class III railroad founded by Randolph Peterson in 1999.

Tri-City Railroad operated a rail line located in Richland, Washington called the Southern Connection. The line was constructed between 1949 and 1950 as a second rail link to the Hanford Nuclear Reservation.

In 1998 the Port of Benton acquired the southern connection with Union Pacific Railroad and BNSF Railway as operators. Tri-City Railroad leased the operation and maintenance of the line in 2002.

Tri-City Railroad contracted with Pacific Northwest National Laboratory in 2005 to assist in developing the Radiation Portal Monitoring System technology for the U.S. Department of Homeland Security's use at railroad border crossings nationwide. In 2014, it contracted with Pacific Northwest National Laboratory to assist in testing for shock and vibration in the movement of spent nuclear fuel by rail.

In 2011, Tri-City began operating on Mare Island in California.

In June 2022, the Port of Benton ended its relationship with Tri-City Railroad after a Benton County court found it had breached the terms of its 2002 lease and failed to maintain the tracks. The railroad ceased operations in July 2022. In February 2023, the Port of Benton contracted with Columbia Rail Group, based in Walla Walla, Washington, to operate and maintain the tracks formerly managed by the Tri-City Railroad.
