= Benton City, Washington =

- City
- City of Benton City
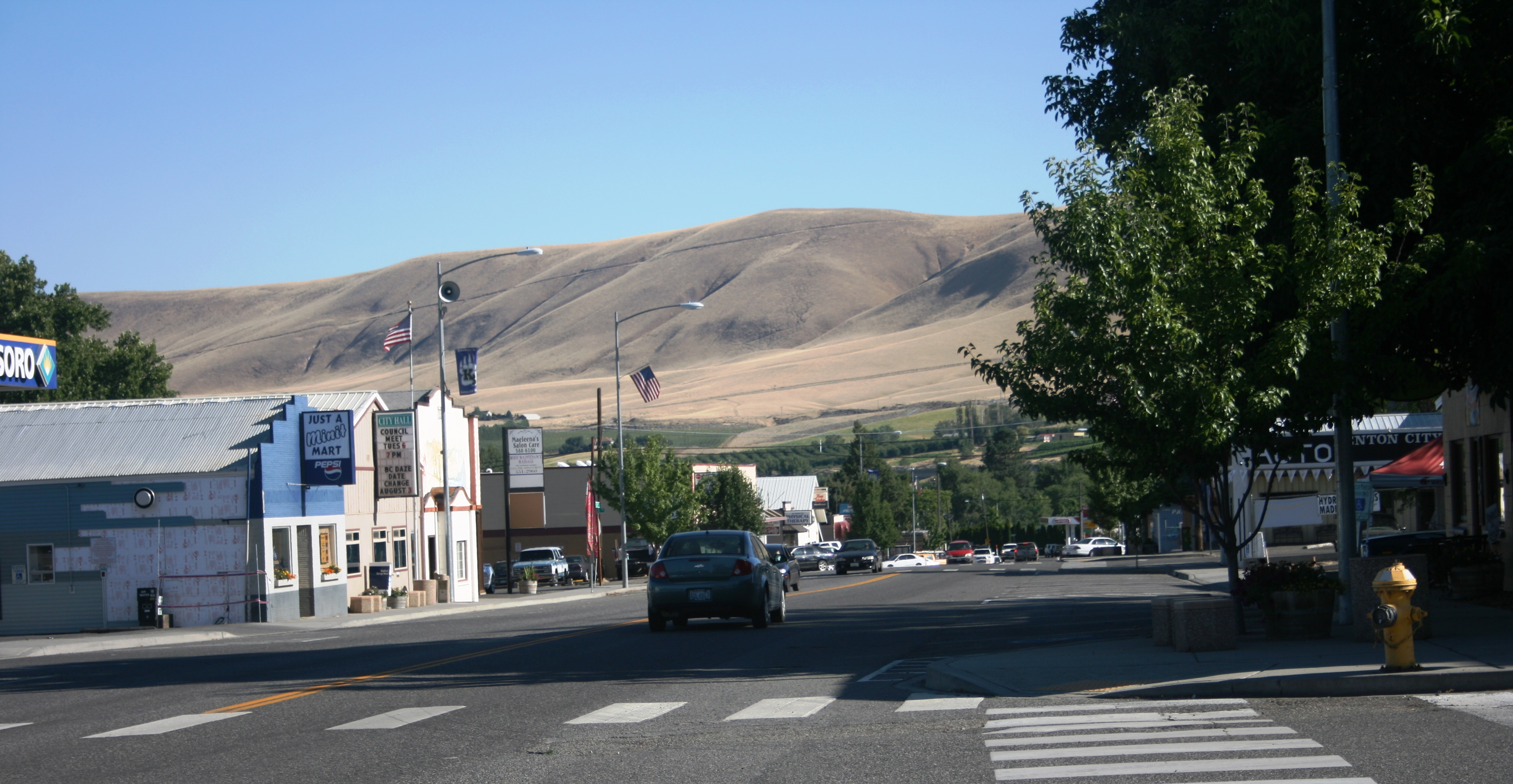
- Down Main Street looking to the south towards the Horse Heaven Hills

- Location of Benton City, Washington
- Coordinates: 46°16′4″N 119°28′50″W
- Country: United States
- State: Washington
- County: Benton

Government
  - Mayor: Len Burton

Area
  - Total: 2.53 sq mi (6.56 km^{2})
  - Land: 2.47 sq mi (6.39 km^{2})
  - Water: 0.066 sq mi (0.17 km^{2})
- Elevation: 472 ft (144 m)

Population (2020)
  - Total: 3,479
  - Density: 1,410/sq mi (544.3/km^{2})
- Time zone: UTC-8 (Pacific (PST))
  - Summer (DST): UTC-7 (PDT)
- ZIP code: 99320
- Area code: 509
- FIPS code: 53-05560
- GNIS feature ID: 2409836
- Website: ci.benton-city.wa.us

Benton City is a city in Benton County, Washington, United States. It is also included in the Tri-Cities metropolitan area, which consists of both Benton and Franklin counties. The population was 3,479 at the 2020 census. The city shares a school district with the adjacent unincorporated community of Kiona.

== History ==
=== Pre-incorporation ===
Benton City was originally platted by the North Coast Railroad in 1909. The line was originally conceived as the North Coast Railroad in 1909, then came under ownership of the Oregon-Washington Railroad and Navigation Company in 1913 when North Coast was merged with Oregon Railroad and Navigation Company before becoming part of the Union Pacific Railroad. It took its name from Benton S. Groscup (and not the county's namesake), who was influential in the separation of Benton County from Yakima County. Freight and passenger depots were built by the railroad in 1910.

=== Post-incorporation ===
The town was officially incorporated July 2, 1945. Irrigation water was brought to the area via the Sunnyside Canal in 1947, allowing the area to grow considerably.

In 2002, the Benton City – Kiona Bridge over the Yakima River at Benton City was added to the National Register of Historic Places.

== Geography ==
Benton City is situated on the inside of a bend on the north side of the Yakima River. The unincorporated community of Kiona is along the southern border of the city.

Interstate 82 and U.S. Route 12 pass through Benton City south of the Yakima River, with access from Exit 96. It is 22 miles (35 km) east to downtown Kennewick on the Columbia River and 65 miles (105 km) northwest to Yakima.

According to the United States Census Bureau, Benton City has a total area of 2.53 square miles (6.55 km^{2}), of which 2.47 square miles (6.40 km^{2}) is land and 0.07 square miles (0.18 km^{2}) is water.

=== Climate ===
Climate data for Benton City, Washington
Month	Jan	Feb	Mar	Apr	May	Jun	Jul	Aug	Sep	Oct	Nov	Dec	Year
Record high °F (°C)	71 (22)	73 (23)	82 (28)	92 (33)	104 (40)	110 (43)	110 (43)	113 (45)	106 (41)	89 (32)	77 (25)	66 (19)	113 (45)
Mean daily maximum °F (°C)	41 (5)	48 (9)	58 (14)	65 (18)	73 (23)	80 (27)	88 (31)	88 (31)	78 (26)	64 (18)	49 (9)	38 (3)	64 (18)
Mean daily minimum °F (°C)	29 (−2)	30 (−1)	35 (2)	41 (5)	48 (9)	54 (12)	59 (15)	58 (14)	50 (10)	40 (4)	34 (1)	28 (−2)	42 (6)
Record low °F (°C)	−21 (−29)	−22 (−30)	11 (−12)	23 (−5)	30 (−1)	38 (3)	41 (5)	39 (4)	31 (−1)	13 (−11)	−6 (−21)	−10 (−23)	−22 (−30)
Average precipitation inches (mm)	1.01 (26)	0.80 (20)	0.69 (18)	0.60 (15)	0.65 (17)	0.50 (13)	0.25 (6.4)	0.16 (4.1)	0.31 (7.9)	0.54 (14)	1.02 (26)	1.12 (28)	7.6 (190)

== Demographics ==
Historical population
Census	Pop.	Note	%±
1950	863		—
1960	1,210		40.2%
1970	1,070		−11.6%
1980	1,980		85.0%
1990	1,806		−8.8%
2000	2,624		45.3%
2010	3,038		15.8%
2020	3,479		14.5%
U.S. Decennial Census

=== 2020 census ===
As of the 2020 census, Benton City had a population of 3,479. The median age was 34.1 years; 27.6% of residents were under the age of 18 and 13.3% were 65 years of age or older. For every 100 females there were 98.9 males, and for every 100 females age 18 and over there were 97.8 males age 18 and over.

0.0% of residents lived in urban areas, while 100.0% lived in rural areas.

There were 1,277 households in Benton City, of which 39.2% had children under the age of 18 living in them. Of all households, 43.3% were married-couple households, 21.3% were households with a male householder and no spouse or partner present, and 25.5% were households with a female householder and no spouse or partner present. About 23.9% of all households were made up of individuals and 9.7% had someone living alone who was 65 years of age or older.

There were 1,381 housing units, of which 7.5% were vacant. The homeowner vacancy rate was 1.9% and the rental vacancy rate was 15.1%.

Racial composition as of the 2020 census
Race	Number	Percent
White	2,273	65.3%
Black or African American	12	0.3%
American Indian and Alaska Native	48	1.4%
Asian	20	0.6%
Native Hawaiian and Other Pacific Islander	7	0.2%
Some other race	739	21.2%
Two or more races	380	10.9%
Hispanic or Latino (of any race)	1,211	34.8%

=== 2010 census ===
As of the 2010 census, there were 3,038 people, 1,086 households, and 738 families residing in the city. The population density was 1,235.0 inhabitants per square mile (476.8/km^{2}). There were 1,162 housing units at an average density of 472.4 per square mile (182.4/km^{2}). The racial makeup of the city was 78.6% White, 0.4% African American, 1.1% Native American, 0.3% Asian, 0.1% Pacific Islander, 16.3% from other races, and 3.2% from two or more races. Hispanic or Latino of any race were 28.5% of the population.

There were 1,086 households, of which 38.9% had children under the age of 18 living with them, 47.1% were married couples living together, 14.7% had a female householder with no husband present, 6.2% had a male householder with no wife present, and 32.0% were non-families. 24.8% of all households were made up of individuals, and 7.6% had someone living alone who was 65 years of age or older. The average household size was 2.80 and the average family size was 3.38.

The median age in the city was 32.8 years. 30.1% of residents were under the age of 18; 9.3% were between the ages of 18 and 24; 26.5% were from 25 to 44; 24.8% were from 45 to 64; and 9.5% were 65 years of age or older. The gender makeup of the city was 50.6% male and 49.4% female.

=== 2000 census ===
As of the census of 2000, there were 2,624 people, 894 households, and 660 families residing in the city. The population density was 1,507.8 people per square mile (582.3/km^{2}). There were 1,043 housing units at an average density of 599.3 per square mile (231.4/km^{2}). The racial makeup of the city was 84.34% White, 0.15% African American, 1.14% Native American, 0.61% Asian, 0.04% Pacific Islander, 10.63% from other races, and 3.09% from two or more races. Hispanic or Latino of any race were 19.51% of the population.

There were 894 households, out of which 44.6% had children under the age of 18 living with them, 54.4% were married couples living together, 11.3% had a female householder with no husband present, and 26.1% were non-families. 21.5% of all households were made up of individuals, and 7.2% had someone living alone who was 65 years of age or older. The average household size was 2.94 and the average family size was 3.44.

In the city, the age distribution of the population shows 34.7% under the age of 18, 8.5% from 18 to 24, 28.8% from 25 to 44, 19.7% from 45 to 64, and 8.2% who were 65 years of age or older. The median age was 30 years. For every 100 females, there were 104.7 males. For every 100 females age 18 and over, there were 102.5 males.

The median income for a household in the city was $33,636, and the median income for a family was $43,036. Males had a median income of $32,464 versus $22,137 for females. The per capita income for the city was $13,971. About 11.7% of families and 15.7% of the population were below the poverty line, including 16.5% of those under age 18 and 2.0% of those age 65 or over.

== Landmarks ==
- Brown's Rock
- Kendall Barn
- Rancho Los Arados
- Yakima River

== Notable Person ==
- James Otto, country musician, graduated from Kiona-Benton High School

== Annual events ==
- Annual Winterfest
- Benton City Daze
- Benton City No Spray Day
- Little Miss Benton City Pageant
- Benton City Day Of Recognition For Local Businesses

== See also ==
- Red Mountain AVA
- Kiona-Benton City School District
