= Yakima River =

River in Washington state, United States

Yakima River.
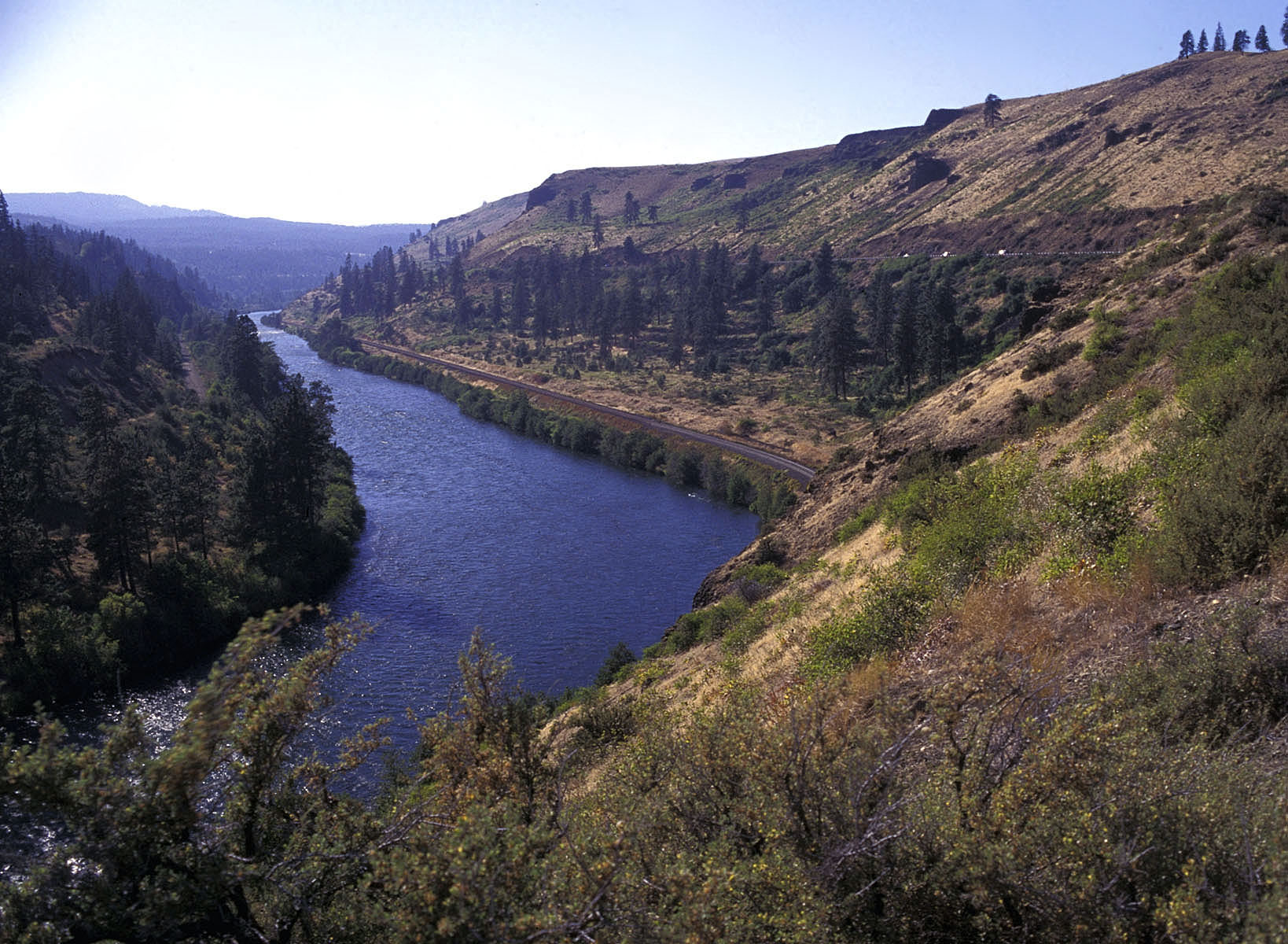
- State Route 10 winds past the Yakima River near the town of Thorp.

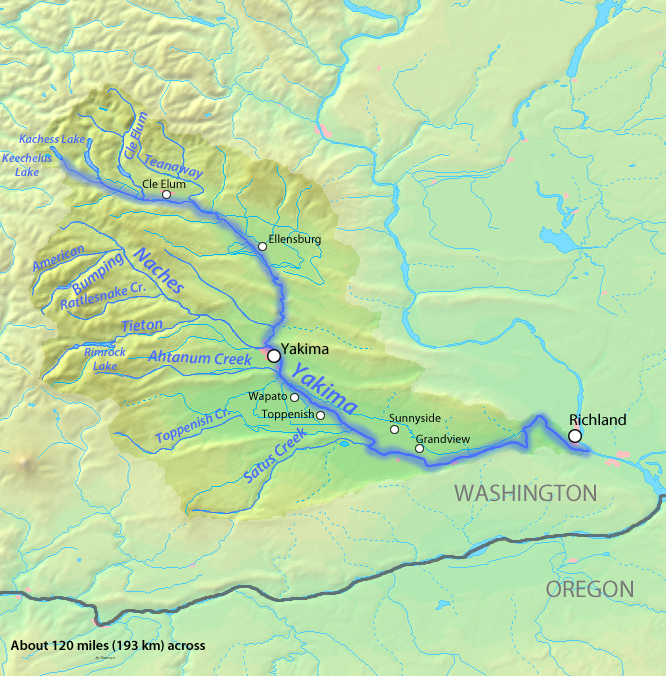
- Map of the Yakima River watershed

Location
- Country: United States
- State: Washington
- Cities: Benton City, Cle Elum, Ellensburg, Yakima, Sunnyside, Richland

Physical characteristics
- Source: Keechelus Lake
  - location: Kittitas County, Washington
  - coordinates: 47°19′20″N 121°20′21″W
  - elevation: 2,520 ft (770 m)
- Mouth: Columbia River at Lake Wallula
  - location: Richland, Benton County, Washington
  - coordinates: 46°15′10″N 119°13′51″W
  - elevation: 344 ft (105 m)
- Length: 214 mi (344 km)
- Basin size: 6,150 sq mi (15,900 km^{2})
- Discharge
  - location: Kiona, RM 30
  - average: 3,493 cu ft/s (98.9 m^{3}/s)
  - minimum: 225 cu ft/s (6.4 m^{3}/s)
  - maximum: 59,400 cu ft/s (1,680 m^{3}/s)
- Discharge
  - location: Mabton, RM 60
  - average: 3,311 cu ft/s (93.8 m^{3}/s)
- Discharge
  - location: Union Gap, RM 107
  - average: 3,542 cu ft/s (100.3 m^{3}/s)
- Discharge
  - location: Umtanum, RM 140
  - average: 2,430 cu ft/s (69 m^{3}/s)

Basin features
- Tributaries
  - left: Cle Elum River, Teanaway River
  - right: Naches River

The Yakima River is a tributary of the Columbia River in south central and eastern Washington state, named for the indigenous Yakama people of the Yakama Nation.

The first western explorers to visit the river were Lewis and Clark on or about October 17, 1805. They stopped briefly at the confluence of the Yakima and the Columbia, although they did not proceed upriver. Lewis and Clark mention in their journals that the Chin-nâm pam (or the Lower Snake River Chamnapam Nation) called the river Tâpe têtt (also rendered Tapteete), possibly from the French tape-tête, meaning "head hit".

== Course ==
The length of the river from headwaters to mouth is 214 miles (344 km), with an average drop of 9.85 feet per mile (1.866 m/km). It is the longest river entirely in Washington state. The headwaters are located in the Cascade Range with an elevation of 2,449 feet (746 m) at Keechelus Dam on Keechelus Lake near Snoqualmie Pass, in Kittitas County. The river flows through both Yakima and Benton counties before connecting with Columbia River creating Bateman Island at the Yakima River Delta with an elevation of 340 feet (100 m).

About 9 million years ago, the Yakima River flowed south from near Vantage to the Tri-Cities, and then turned west straight for the ocean through Badger Canyon west of Kennewick. Badger Canyon was once a waterway of the Yakima River, this pre-existing channel led the Yakima River to make tribute to the Columbia River at the current location of the city of Kennewick. Beginning nearly 15,000 years ago the Columbia Plateau was transformed by the successive Missoula glacial outburst floods. Much of the flood water made way down the Columbia river Channel where a 'choke-point' known as Wallula Gap caused the restriction of flow. Floodwaters began ponding near the Tri-Cities resulting in the back-flooding of the Columbia's tributary valleys. Badger Canyon was an entry point for back-flooding of the Yakima Valley, successive floods left behind thick deposits of sediments in Badger Canyon and the Valley beyond. These flood deposits which were deposited in large quantities in short amounts of time changed the ground elevation within Badger Canyon causing the Yakima River to re-route north of Red Mountain and enter the Columbia River by present-day Richland.

During the last ice age, the Missoula Floods further altered the landscape of the area, opening up the Horn Rapids area to the Yakima River. The West Fork of Amon Creek now utilizes Badger Canyon.

== Recreation ==
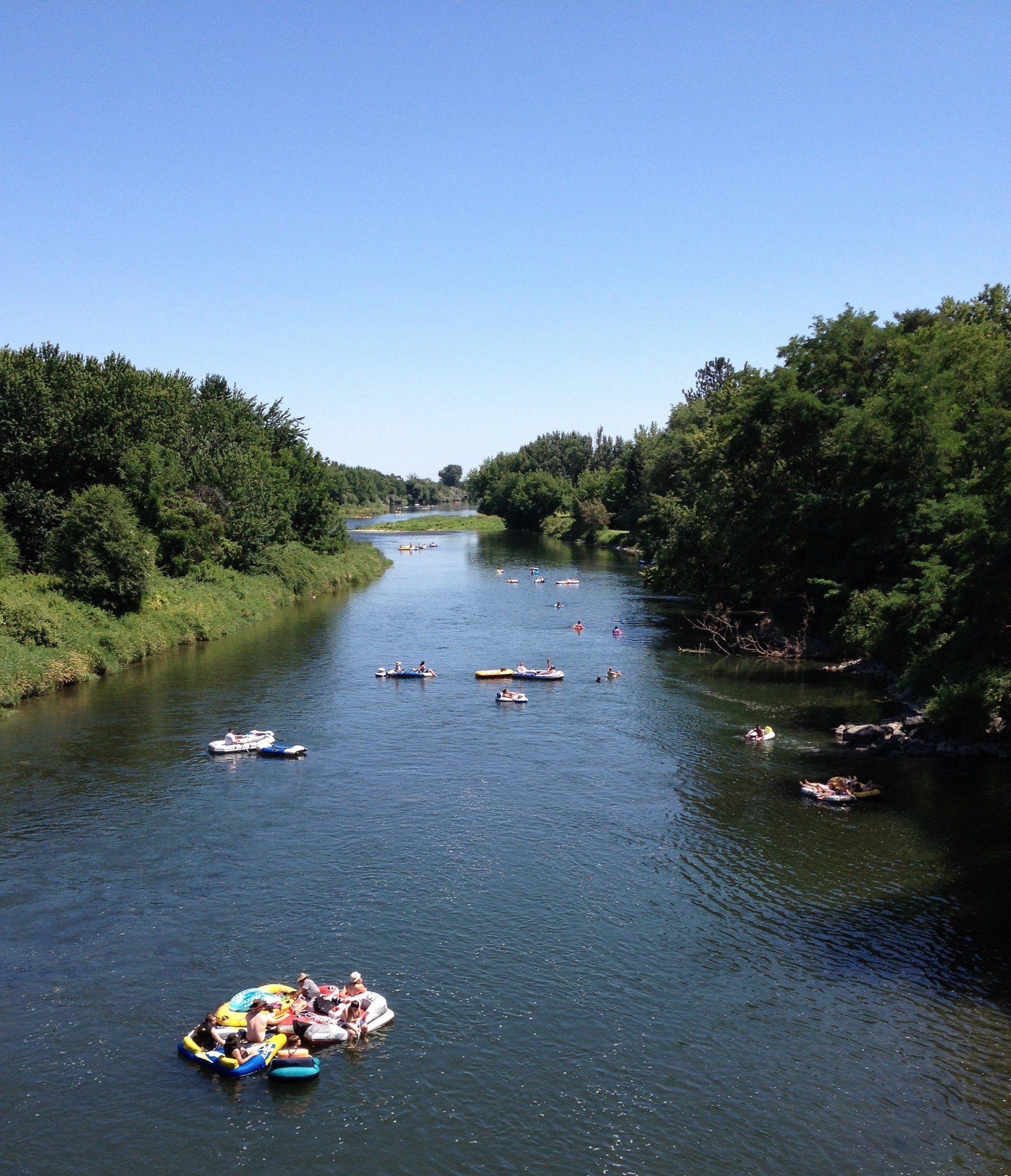
Rafters enjoying a summer day on the Yakima River at West Richland, Washington near the confluence with the Columbia River.

The Yakima River is used for rafting, kayaking, and fishing, especially around the Ellensburg area and near the confluence with the Columbia River during the summer months. The Yakima River is ranked between Class I and Class II rapids, depending on the circumstances and season. In the Tri-Cities, the delta where the Yakima meets the Columbia has several hiking trails.

The Yakima River is the only Blue Ribbon river in Washington state, with diverse fisheries including Rainbow Trout, Brown Trout, Smallmouth Bass. The Yakama Nation began reintroducing Sockeye Salmon to the basin in 2009.

The dry climate, with over 300 sunshine days a year, draws visitors from Seattle, about two hours' drive away.

== Yakima Valley ==
The Yakima River Basin consists of approximately 6,150 square miles (15,900 km^{2}) located in south central Washington State. It is bounded by the Cascade Mountains on the west, the Wenatchee Mountains on the north, Rattlesnake Mountain and the Rattlesnake Hills on the east, and the Horse Heaven Hills to the south. The basin encompasses areas designated by the Washington Department of Ecology as the Upper Yakima Water Resource Inventory Areas (WRIAs) 38 and 39 and the Lower Yakima WRIA 37. The dividing line between these northern and southern sections is the confluence of the Naches and Yakima Rivers.

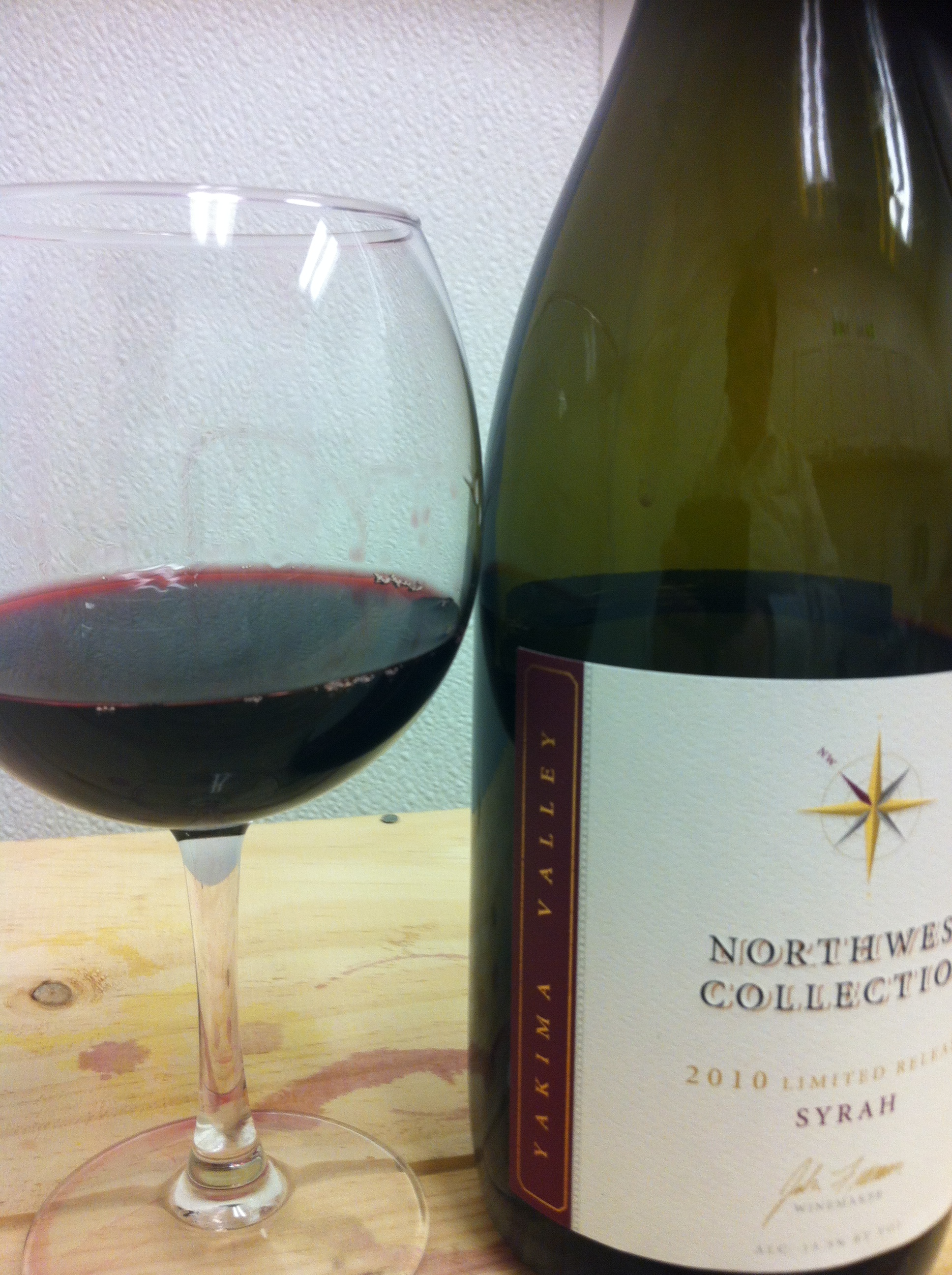
A Syrah wine grown in the Yakima Valley AVA.

The Yakima River provides irrigation for the dry but fertile land in the valley, and irrigated agriculture is the economic base. Agricultural land totals 1,000 square miles (2,600 km^{2}), including irrigated pastures, orchards, grapes, hops, and field crops. A significant portion of Washington apples and cherries are grown in the valley, as well as most (75%) of the United States's hops. Since the late 20th century, the wine industry has grown rapidly in the area. It is the location of the Yakima Valley AVA, a designated American Viticultural Area.

Major landowners in the valley include federal and state agencies and the Yakama Indian Nation. Private ownership accounts for 1,246,818 acres (5,045.69 km^{2}). The United States Forest Service manages 892,509 acres (3,611.86 km^{2}), and the Yakama Nation owns 889,786 acres (3,600.84 km^{2}) within the basin. Forested areas in the northern and western portions of the basin occupy approximately 2,200 square miles (5,700 km^{2}) and are used for recreation, wildlife habitat, timber harvest, grazing, and tribal cultural activities. Range lands comprise about 2,900 square miles (7,500 km^{2}) and are used for military training, grazing, wildlife habitat, and tribal cultural activities.

Major population centers include the city of Yakima and the Tri-Cities area. Population growth for the 1990s was projected at 7.9% in Kittitas County, 19.7% in Yakima County, and 22.7% in Benton County. While much of the growth in Benton and Yakima counties has been in and around the incorporated areas, most of the growth in Kittitas County has been in unincorporated areas.

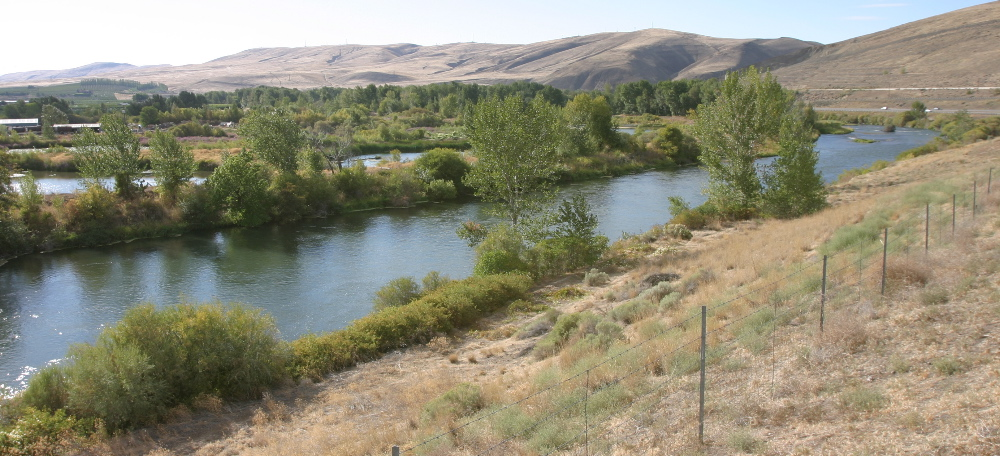
The Yakima River south of Union Gap

In addition to irrigated agriculture, the major economic driving forces include timber harvest and processing, cattle, and outdoor recreation. With the significant reduction in timber harvesting on federal lands and the implementation of the Northwest Forest Plan to protect the endangered northern spotted owl, the timber economy has been greatly eroded in recent years. The proximity to high population areas of the Puget Sound has caused a rapid increase in the demand for outdoor recreational experiences in the basin.

== River modifications ==
The Yakima River and its tributaries have been heavily altered for the purpose of irrigated agriculture, managed by local Irrigation Districts. With the Reclamation Act of 1902 the United States Bureau of Reclamation began building infrastructure to deliver water for Yakima Valley farmers. In drought years, irrigation systems in the Yakima's watershed contribute to periods of both severe river dewatering and elevated flows, relative to the historic streamflow regime. As a result, discharge statistics for the Yakima River are heavily affected by the irrigation system. The USGS operates four streamflow gauges on the Yakima River. The highest average discharge recorded, 3,542 cubic feet per second (100.3 m^{3}/s), is more than halfway up the river at Union Gap. The two downriver gauges show average flows of a reduced amount.

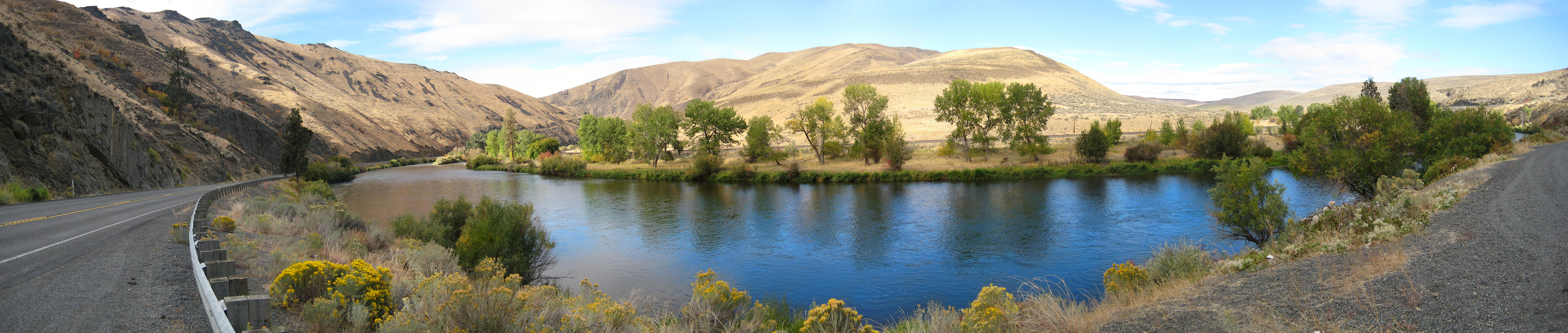
180° panorama of the Yakima River as viewed from Highway 821.

== See also ==
- List of rivers of Washington (state)
- List of tributaries of the Columbia River
- List of dams and reservoirs in Washington (state)
