= Timeline of the Tri-Cities, Washington =

The following is a timeline of the history of the Tri-Cities, an area of the U.S. state of Washington encompassing the cities of Kennewick, Pasco, and Richland.

== Before the 19th century ==
- Native Americans explore and settle throughout the Columbia Basin region which includes the Tri-Cities area. Kennewick Man lived there approximately 9,000 years before present.

== 19th century ==
- 1805 - October 16: The Lewis and Clark Expedition passes through the Tri-Cities area heading west, camping near present-day Sacajawea State Park and visiting Bateman Island.
- 1806 - April 28: The Lewis and Clark Expedition passes through the Tri-Cities area on their return journey.
- 1811 - Members of the Astor Expedition likely passed through the Tri-Cities traveling on the Snake and Columbia Rivers.
- 1824 - June 29: As part of the Oregon boundary dispute, the British propose a boundary between the United States and British North America using the Columbia River in a manner that would have split the region, placing what is now Kennewick and Richland in British territory with the Pasco side of the river being American territory. This proposal was rejected by the United States.

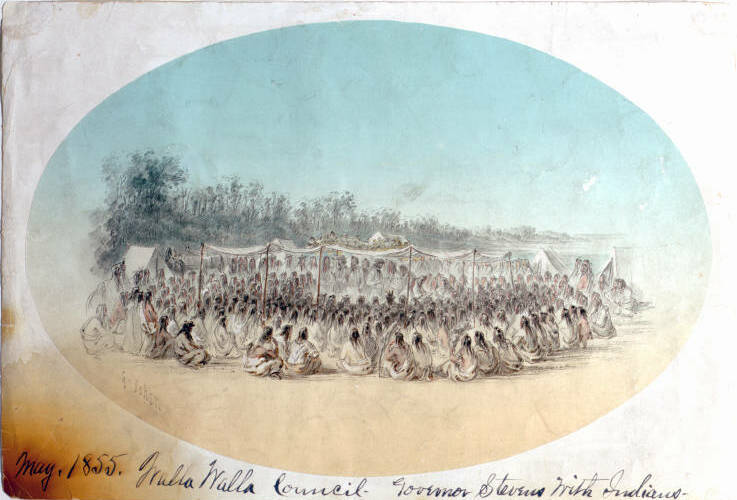
The Walla Walla Council.

- 1847 - The St. Rose of Chemna Catholic mission was established approximately 3 miles from the confluence of the Columbia and Yakima Rivers on the south bank, at the approximate location of the current I-182 bridge in South Richland. The mission was reported abandoned as late as 1859.
- 1855 - The Umatilla and Yakama tribes cede the land the Tri-Cities sit on at the Walla Walla Council.
- 1879 - Ainsworth becomes the first community platted. The town, which no longer exists, was in what is now the east end of Pasco.
- 1883 - November 28: Franklin County splits from Whitman County with Ainsworth as the county seat.
- 1884 - The Oregon Steam Navigation Company opens a railroad bridge over the Snake River at Ainsworth.
- 1885 - The seat of Franklin County moves from Ainsworth to Pasco.
- 1888 - The Northern Pacific Railroad opens a railroad bridge across the Columbia River.
- 1891 - September 3: Pasco is incorporated.
- 1894 - February 1: Weather records begin to be taken at Kennewick.

== 20th century ==
=== 1900s to 1940s ===
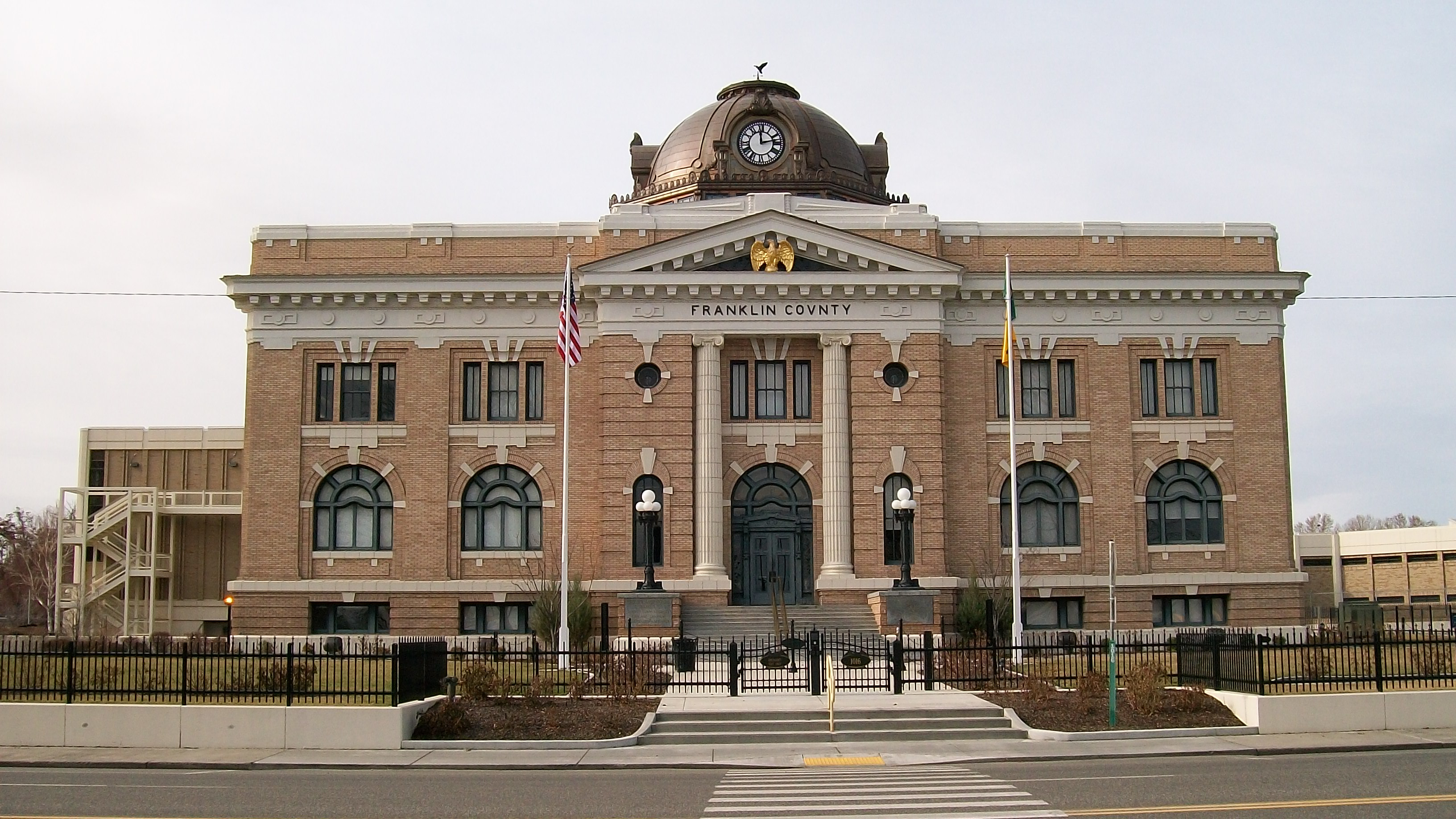
The Franklin County Courthouse in Pasco.

- 1902
  - The first issue of the Pasco Express, a weekly newspaper, is published.
  - March 27: The first issue of the Columbia Courier, a weekly newspaper, is published. It would later become the Kennewick Courier.
  - September: The first load of wheat originating at Pasco was shipped.
- 1904 - February 5: Kennewick is incorporated.
- 1905 - March 8: Benton County is formed out of the eastern portions of Klickitat County and Yakima County with Prosser as county seat.
- 1908 - January 27: The first issue of the Kennewick Reporter, a weekly newspaper, is published.
- 1910 - April 28: Richland is incorporated.
- 1913 - Construction of the Franklin County Courthouse is completed.
- 1914 - April 2: The Kennewick Courier and Kennewick Reporter merge to become the Kennewick Courier-Reporter.
- 1915
  - March 6: The Port of Kennewick is created.
  - May 3: The Celilo Canal opens near The Dalles, Oregon, granting the Tri-Cities access to the Pacific Ocean.
- 1922 - The Pasco-Kennewick Bridge, informally known as the Green Bridge, opens allowing automobile traffic to cross the Columbia without a ferry for the first time in the area.
- 1926 - April 6: The first civilian air mail flight in the United States departs Pasco for Boise, Idaho and Elko, Nevada operated by Varney Air Lines.
- 1931 - Sacajawea State Park is established at the confluence of the Columbia and Snake Rivers where Lewis and Clark camped in 1805.
- 1936 - July 15: The State Line earthquake, centered near Milton-Freewater, Oregon, impacts the region.
- 1940 - The Port of Pasco is created.
- 1942
  - Naval Air Station Pasco is established, becoming one of the three busiest naval aviation training facilities of World War II.
  - June 1: Grand Coulee Dam, part of the Columbia Basin Project, is completed allowing water from the Columbia River to be used for irrigation in and north of Pasco.
- 1943
  - The Richland Airport is built as part of the Hanford Site.
  - February 9: Selection of the Hanford Site is approved as part of the Manhattan Project, encompassing Richland and a large portion of Benton County to the north of town.

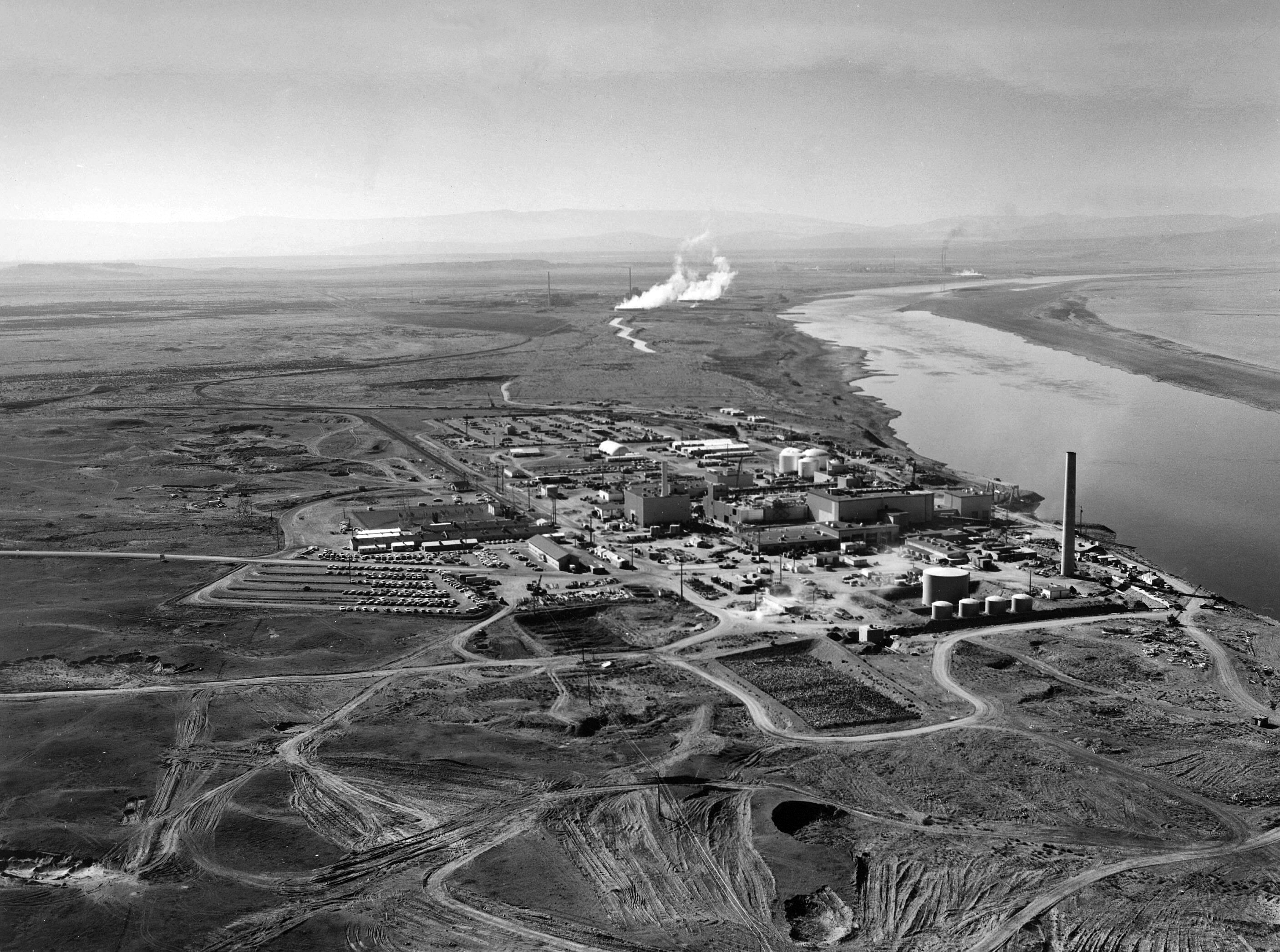
Several of the reactors on the Hanford Site.

- 1944 - September: The B Reactor on the Hanford Site is completed, becoming the first large-scale nuclear reactor in the world.
- 1945
  - May 7: Plutonium from the Hanford Site is used at the Trinity Site near Socorro, New Mexico in the world's first test of a nuclear bomb.
  - August 9: Plutonium from the Hanford Site is used in Fat Man, the bomb detonated over the Japanese city of Nagasaki.
- 1946 - Crane manufacturer Lampson International is established in Kennewick.
- 1947 - November 13: The Pasco Herald (formerly the Pasco Express) moves to Kennewick, rebrands as the Tri-City Herald, and becomes a daily newspaper.
- 1948 - May 31: Flooding on the Columbia River inundates a large portion of Kennewick and Richland, killing one.
- 1949 - May 10: The Uptown Shopping Center opens in Richland.

=== 1950s to 1990s ===
- 1950
  - The Tri-City Braves baseball team forms. The team was known under various names during its existence, including the Tri-City Atoms.
  - February 4: The Courier-Herald (formerly Kennewick Courier-Reporter) publishes its final issue.
- 1953 - Regional restaurant chain Zip's Drive In is established in Kennewick.

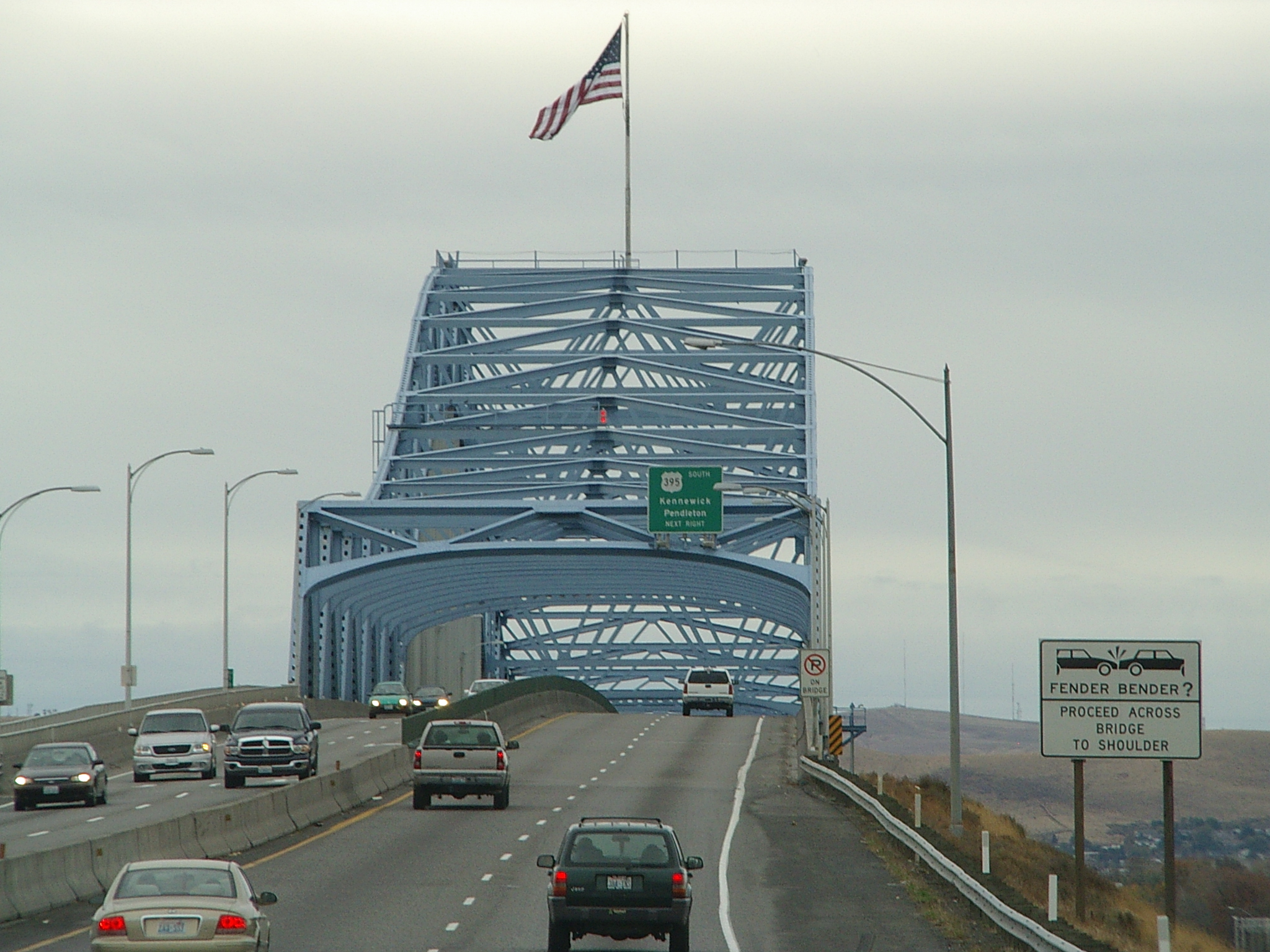
The Blue Bridge.

- 1954
  - McNary Dam near Umatilla, Oregon is completed, impounding the Columbia River and inundating parts of the Tri-Cities.
  - July 30: The Blue Bridge, officially named the Pioneer Memorial Bridge, opens.
  - December 28: KEPR begins television broadcasts.
- 1955
  - June 13: West Richland is incorporated.
  - September: Columbia Basin College opens in Pasco.
- 1958 - November: Port of Benton is created with a port district covering all of the parts of Benton County that weren't included in the Port of Kennewick's district.
- 1961
  - Ice Harbor Dam opens on the Snake River upstream of Pasco.
  - August 5: Ice Harbor Dam records the hottest temperature in Washington State history with a high of 118 °F (48 °C).
  - October 10: KNDU begins television broadcasts.
  - December: The Port of Benton opens the Richland Airport for public use.
- 1963 - September 26: President John F. Kennedy visits the Hanford Site for the groundbreaking of the N Reactor.
- 1965
  - The Federal Building in Richland opens upon completion of construction.
  - January 4: Pacific Northwest National Laboratory opens in Richland.
- 1966 - July: Annual hydroplane races begin in Columbia Park.
- 1969 - Columbia Center Mall opens in Kennewick.
- 1970 - October: KVEW begins television broadcasts.
- 1974 - The Tri-City Ports (formerly the Tri-City Atoms and Tri-City Braves) play their final baseball season.
- 1977 - Control of the Hanford Site passes from the Department of Defense to the Department of Energy.
- 1978 - September 8: The Cable Bridge, officially known as the Ed Hendler Bridge, opens replacing the Pasco-Kennewick Bridge (Green Bridge) built in 1922.

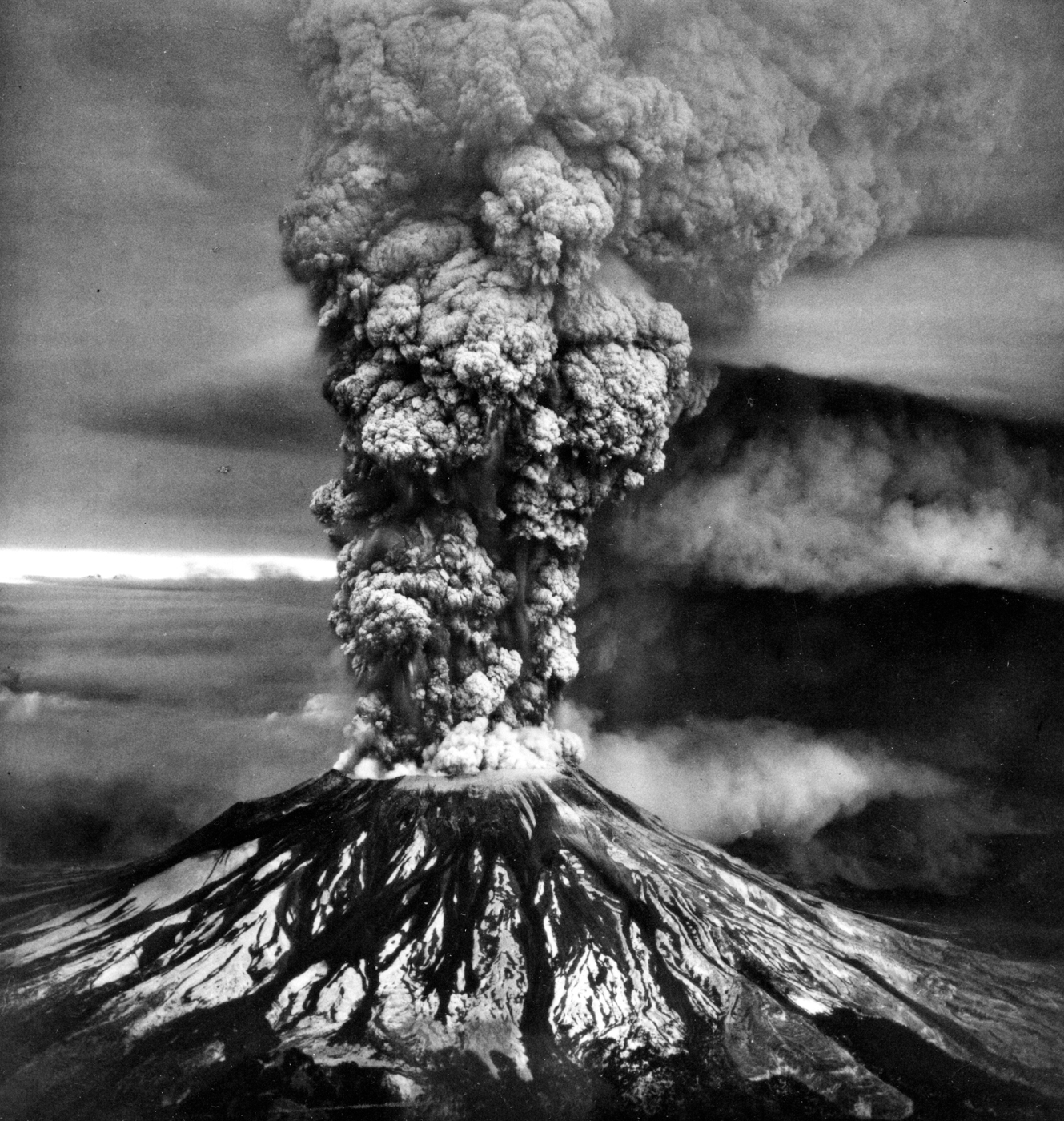
Mount St. Helens erupting on May 18, 1980.

- 1980 - May 18: Mount St. Helens erupts, blanketing the Tri-Cities in ash.
- 1982 - May 10: Passenger service on Ben Franklin Transit, the area's public transit agency, begins.
- 1983 - The Walla Walla Padres baseball team relocates to Richland and becomes the Tri-City Triplets.
- 1984
  - November 27: The Interstate 182 Bridge opens, creating the first road connection between Richland and Pasco.
  - December 13: The Columbia Generating Station, a nuclear power plant north of Richland, starts commercial power production.
- 1986
  - The Tri-City Triplets play their final season before relocating to Boise, Idaho.
  - February 23: The stretch of Interstate 82 between Benton City and Kennewick is dedicated, granting the Tri-Cities access to the Interstate Highway System.
- 1987
  - The Tri-City Herald switches from an afternoon daily newspaper to a morning daily newspaper.
  - October 18: KTNW begins television broadcasts.
- 1988
  - The New Westminster Bruins of the Western Hockey League relocate to Kennewick, becoming the Tri-City Americans.
  - November 19: The Toyota Center opens as the Tri-Cities Coliseum in Kennewick.
- 1989 - October 4: Four locations on the Hanford Site are added to the list of Superfund sites for environmental clean up. One was removed in 1996.

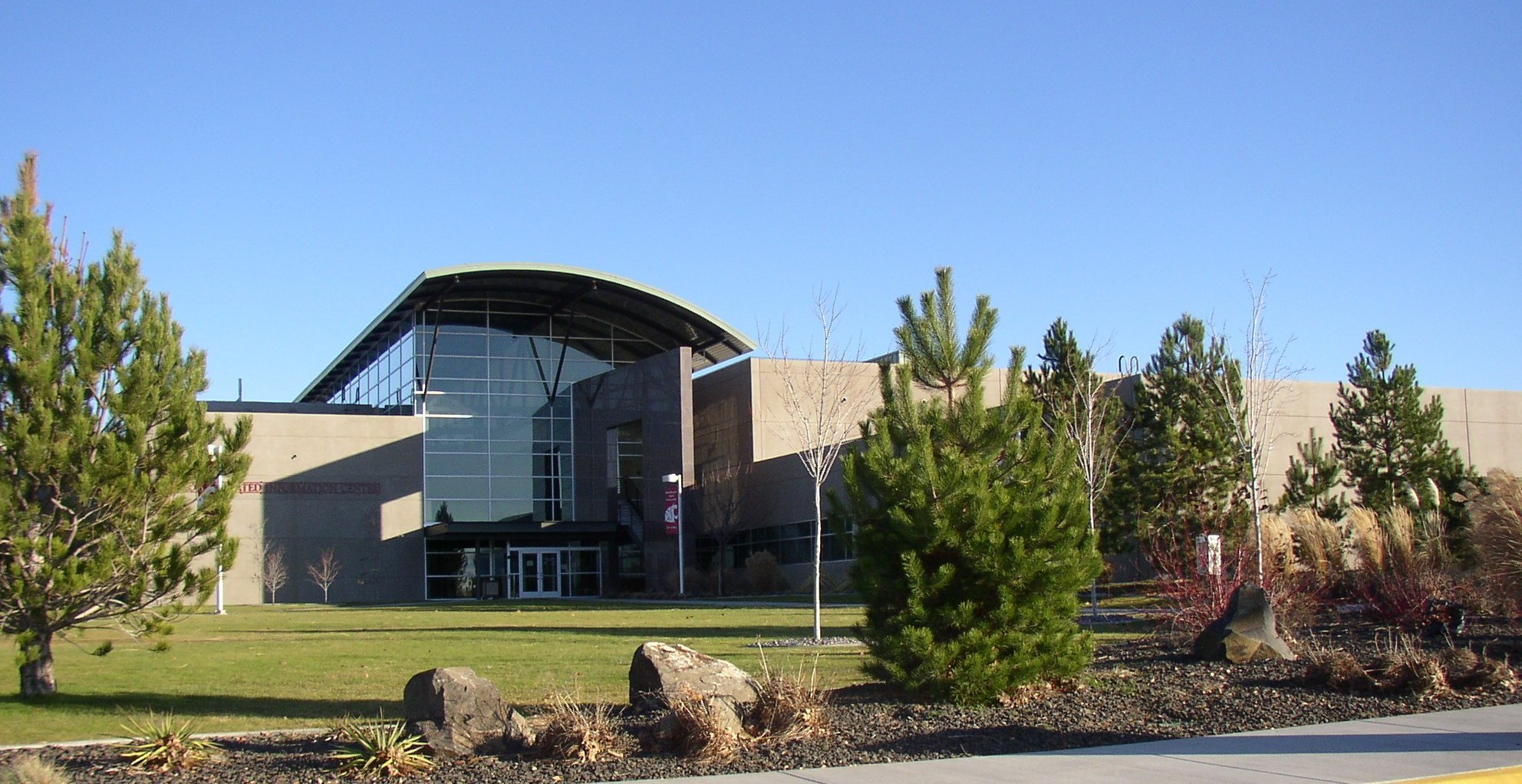
A building on the WSU Tri-Cities campus.

- 1990
  - Washington State University establishes its Tri-Cities campus in Richland. Previous to this, the site offered some courses from WSU, the University of Washington, and Oregon State University.
  - March: The Pasco-Kennewick Bridge (Green Bridge) that was built in 1922 is demolished.
  - July & August: Some events of the 1990 Goodwill Games take place at the Toyota Center.
- 1995
  - Gesa Stadium opens in Pasco as Tri-City Stadium.
  - The Tri-City Posse forms as a founding member of the Western Baseball League.
- 1996 - July 28: Kennewick Man is discovered in Columbia Park.
- 1999 - January 11: KFFX begins television broadcasts as KAUP, changing callsigns in April.

== 21st century ==
- 2000 - The Tri-City Posse plays their final season.

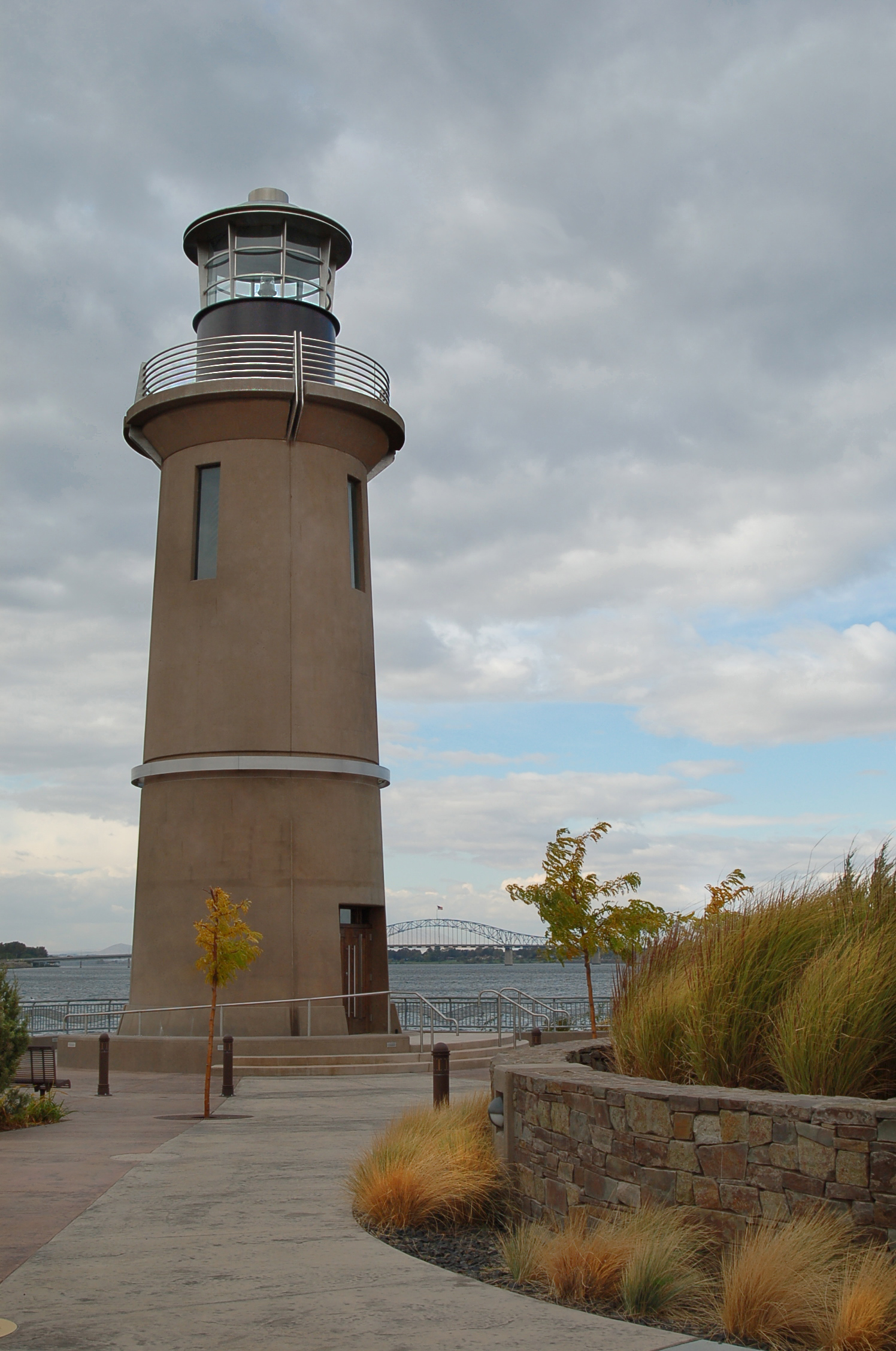
The lighthouse on Clover Island.

- 2001
  - The Portland Rockies baseball team (affiliated with the Colorado Rockies) relocates to Pasco and become the Tri-City Dust Devils.
  - November 18: The Church of Jesus Christ of Latter-day Saints dedicates the Columbia River Washington Temple in Richland.
- 2005 - March 26: Arena football team Tri-Cities Fever plays their first game.
- 2006 - Columbia Basin College opens its Health Science Center in Richland.
- 2010 - February: The first lighthouse to be built in the United States since 1962 becomes operational on Clover Island.
- 2011 - September 11: A memorial to the victims of the September 11 attacks, including pieces from the World Trade Center, is dedicated at the Southridge Sports and Events Complex.
- 2013 - December 31: The Port of Kennewick closes Vista Field, which was originally built as an axillary airfield for NAS Pasco.
- 2015 - September 14: Scientists at the Laser Interferometer Gravitational-Wave Observatory (LIGO) on the Hanford Site and in Livingston, Louisiana detect gravity waves for the first time. The 2017 Nobel Prize in Physics would be awarded based on this discovery.
- 2016 - June 30: Tri-Cities Fever goes into dormancy.
- 2017 - May 9: A section of tunnel where contaminated materials were stored on the Hanford Site collapses.

== See also ==
- Timeline of Seattle
- Timeline of Spokane, Washington
- Timeline of Washington (state) history
