= Interstate 182 =

Interstate Highway in Washington, U.S.

Interstate 182
- Map of the Tri-Cities in Washington with I-182 highlighted in red

Route information
- Auxiliary route of I-82
- Maintained by WSDOT
- Length: 15.19 mi (24.45 km)
- Existed: June 23, 1969–present
- History: Completed in 1986
- Tourist routes: Lewis and Clark Trail
- NHS: Entire route

Major junctions
- West end: I-82 / US 12 near Richland
- SR 240 in Richland; US 395 in Pasco; US 395 / SR 397 in Pasco
- East end: US 12 in Pasco

Location
- Country: United States
- State: Washington
- Counties: Benton, Franklin

Highway system
- Interstate Highway System; Main; Auxiliary; Suffixed; Business; Future; State highways in Washington; Interstate; US; State; Scenic; Pre-1964; 1964 renumbering; Former
← SR 181	→ SR 193

Interstate 182 (I-182) is an east–west auxiliary Interstate Highway in the U.S. state of Washington. It connects I-82 to the Tri-Cities region and crosses the Columbia River on the Interstate 182 Bridge between Richland and Pasco. I-182 is 15 miles (24 km) long and entirely concurrent with U.S. Route 12 (US 12). It also intersects Washington State Route 240 (SR 240) and US 395.

Business leaders in the Tri-Cities began lobbying for a freeway in 1958 after early alignments for I-82 were routed away from the area. I-182 was created by the federal government in 1969 as a compromise that would directly connect to the Tri-Cities area while allowing other traffic to bypass it. The project would also incorporate an existing proposal to build a bridge between Richland and Pasco at the site of a cable ferry that ran until 1931.

Construction on I-182 was to begin in 1971, but was delayed by opposition from conservation groups, disputes over interchange locations, and a federal freeze on highway funding in 1980. The first section to be built, over the Yakima River west of Richland, began construction in late 1980 and opened to traffic three years later. The Interstate 182 Bridge opened in November 1984 and linked to a longer section opened a month earlier in Pasco connecting to the existing US 12 bypass. The final sections of the freeway, between I-82 and Richland, opened to traffic in March 1986.

== Route description ==
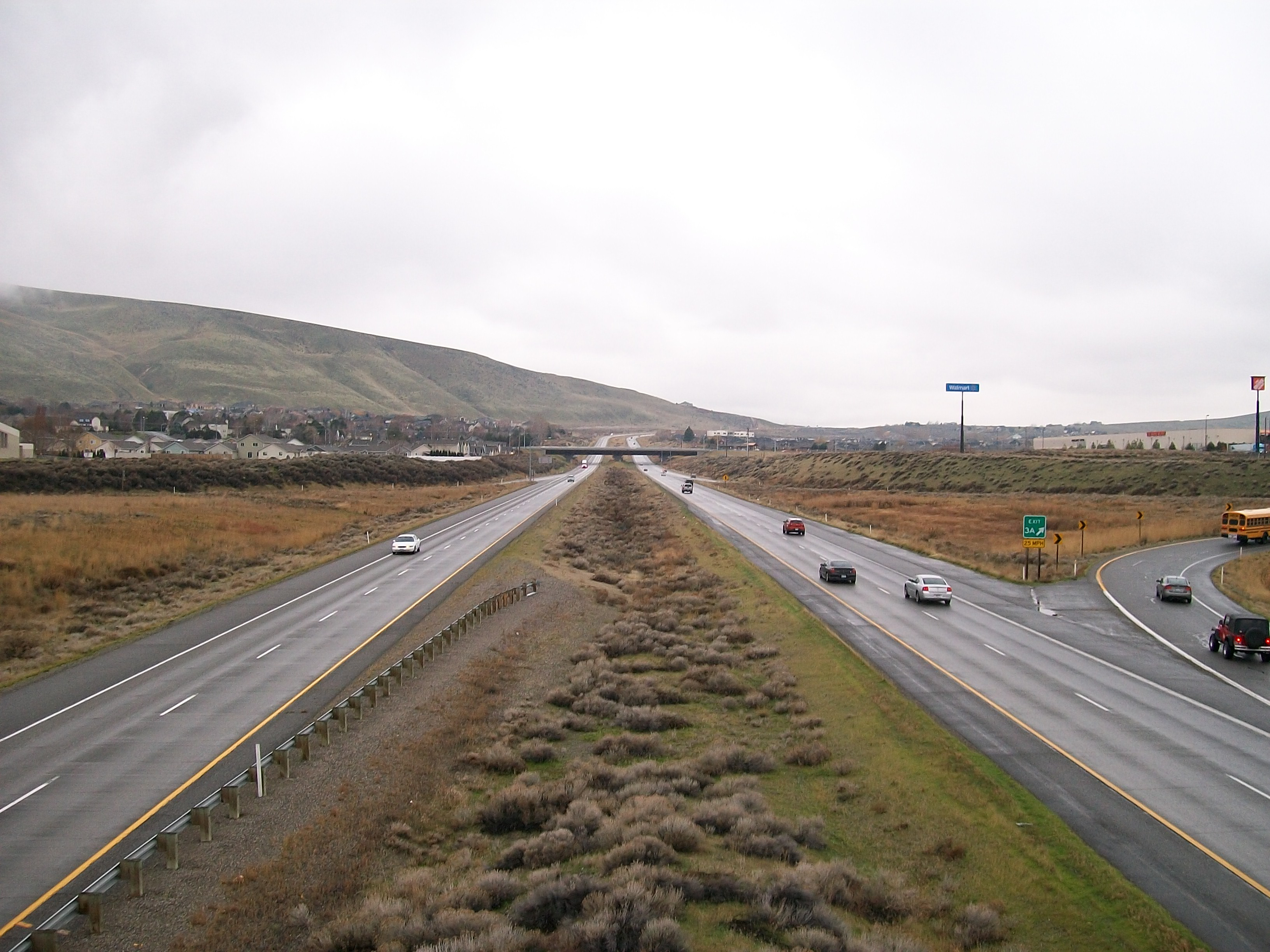
I-182 approaching Queensgate Drive in western Richland

The freeway begins at a trumpet interchange with I-82 and US 12 near Badger Mountain southwest of Richland. The I-182/US 12 concurrency travels through the Goose Gap in the Horse Heaven Hills and continues northeast into suburban Richland, cutting between housing subdivisions and big-box stores around the Queensgate Drive interchange. It then crosses over the Yakima River and intersects SR 240, beginning a short concurrency along the southern outskirts of central Richland while following the Tri-City Railroad. At the following interchange with George Washington Way, SR 240 splits from the freeway and travels southeast towards Kennewick.

From Richland, I-182 passes a golf course and crosses the Columbia River on the Interstate 182 Bridge—officially, the Lee–Volpentest Bridges—which carries six lanes and a section of the Sacagawea Heritage Trail on twin 1,950-foot-long (590 m) concrete spans. The freeway then enters Franklin County and passes through the suburban neighborhoods of western Pasco as it bends southeast after an interchange with Broadmoor Boulevard. It then passes Gesa Stadium, a minor league ballpark, at North Road 68 and reaches an interchange with US 395, which connects to downtown Kennewick via the Blue Bridge.

I-182 continues concurrently with US 12 and US 395 around the south side of the Columbia Basin College campus and uses an eastbound collector–distributor lane until its next interchange at 20th Avenue, near the entrance to the Tri-Cities Airport. The freeway passes between residential areas and a golf course before crossing over a railyard owned by the BNSF Railway north of Pasco's Amtrak station. At a cloverleaf interchange with SR 397 northeast of Pasco, US 395 splits off to travel north towards Spokane. I-182 ends southeast of the interchange, while the roadway continues as US 12 towards Burbank and Walla Walla.

As a component of the Interstate Highway System, the entire 15-mile (24 km) corridor of I-182 is listed as part of the National Highway System, a national network of roads identified as important to the national economy, defense, and mobility; it is also part of the state government's Highway of Statewide Significance program, recognizing its connection to major communities. The freeway is maintained by the Washington State Department of Transportation (WSDOT), which conducts an annual survey of traffic volume that is expressed in terms of annual average daily traffic. Average traffic volumes on the highway in 2016 ranged from a minimum of 11,000 vehicles at the I-82 interchange to a maximum of 67,000 vehicles at its eastern interchange with SR 240. The corridor is served by several bus routes operated by Ben Franklin Transit and has two park-and-ride facilities.

== History ==
=== Predecessor highways and crossings ===
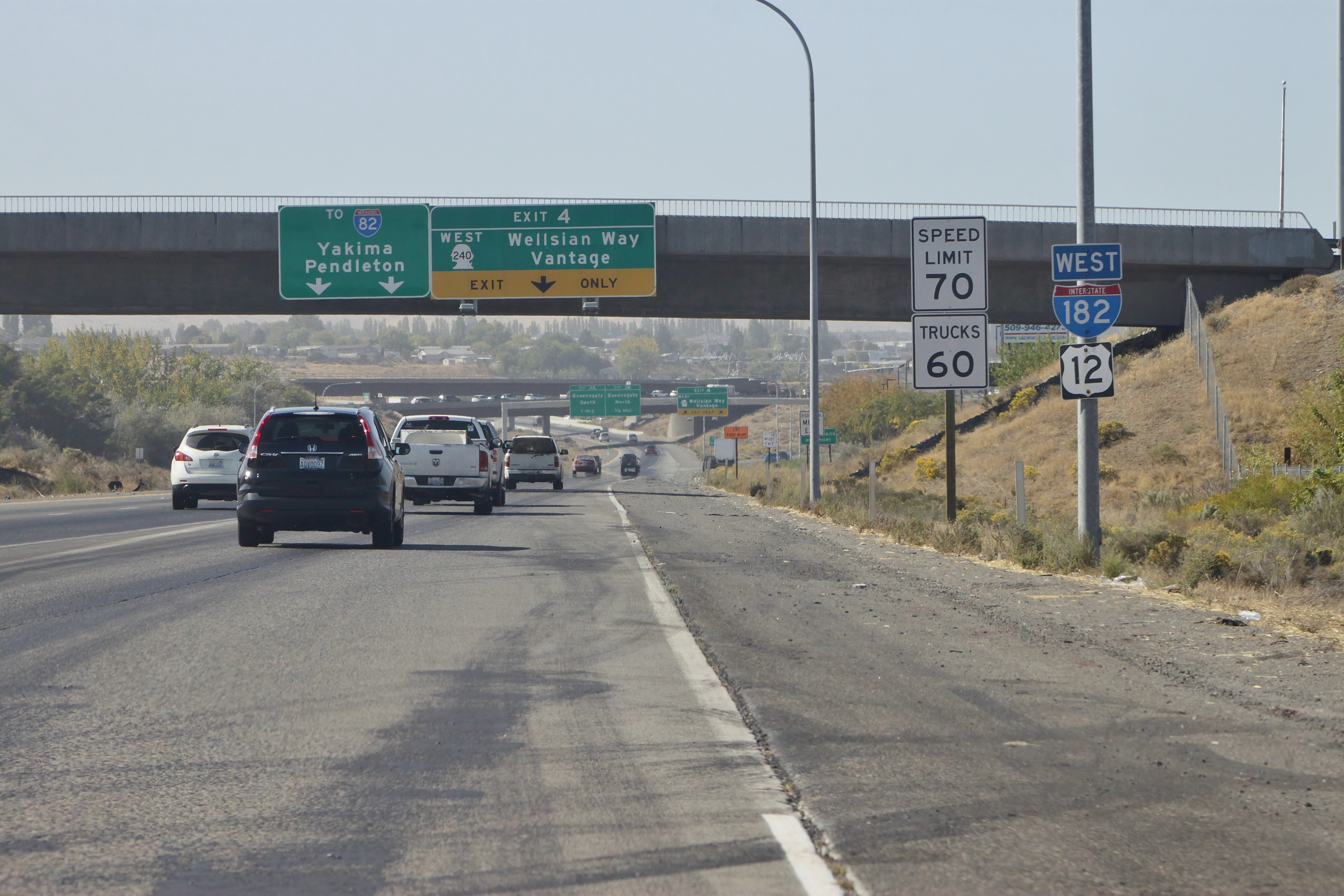
I-182 westbound near SR 240 in Richland, co-signed with US 12 (the successor to US 410)

The Tri-Cities region gained its first overland connection in July 1888 with the completion of the Northern Pacific Railway's permanent bridge over the Columbia River between Kennewick and the new town of Pasco. A road bridge was opened nearby in October 1922 and became part of the Inland Empire Highway (State Road 3), a state highway created in 1913 to connect Ellensburg to the Palouse and Spokane. The Inland Empire Highway was incorporated into the national numbered highway system created in 1926, which divided it between several routes. The Tri-Cities section was part of US 410, an east–west route that connected Aberdeen to Lewiston, Idaho.

Richland's sole Columbia River crossing was the Timmerman ferry, a cable ferry that ran from 1894 to 1931, but an alternate existed using the Yakima River bridge and a route through Kennewick. A fixed bridge north of the city was proposed in the 1940s and 1950s in response to job growth at North Richland's Hanford Site under the jurisdiction of the Atomic Energy Commission (AEC). The bridge was never funded for study, but the AEC built a four-lane bridge across the Yakima River to connect Richland to Kennewick in 1951 that replaced an earlier bailey bridge and helped relieve Hanford traffic.

=== I-82 routing dispute ===
I-82 was added to the Interstate Highway System in October 1957 by the federal government, which allocated approximately 132 miles (212 km) for the corridor from Ellensburg, Washington, to Pendleton, Oregon. The initial proposal from the federal government, which was approved by the Washington State Highway Commission in January 1958, would follow the Yakima Valley but bypass the Tri-Cities by turning south near Prosser or Mabton to cross the Columbia River near Boardman, Oregon. After the route was shifted east in 1958 to cross the Columbia River on the existing Umatilla Bridge, business leaders in the Tri-Cities began lobbying for a longer freeway to directly serve the area. In 1961, the state government ordered a feasibility study to examine a modified route that would serve the Tri-Cities, including the use of the Hanford Site to bypass the Yakima Valley. The study came in response to a lobbying effort from the Tri-Cities with support from Walla Walla leaders. The study initially concluded that a Tri-Cities alignment would be unable to stay within the maximum mileage from the federal Bureau of Public Roads (BPR) for the project, but a re-study was ordered in January 1962.

The results of the second study were unveiled by the Washington State Highway Commission in May 1963, including a route that would turn south at Kiona on the outskirts of the Tri-Cities. The commission instead chose a route that would turn south in Prosser, which sparked another round of requests the following year from the newly-formed Benton–Franklin Counties Good Roads Association. The association received support from local politicians, businessmen, and the Tri-City Nuclear Industrial Council among other groups. A separate feasibility study begun in 1965 recommended a longer alignment through southern Richland and northern Pasco that would continue along Lake Wallula towards Pendleton. This study was endorsed by the commission and the regional BPR office in December 1967 but remained opposed by Oregon groups.

=== Planning and opposition ===
I-182 was proposed by the federal government in late 1968 as a compromise between the Washington and Oregon highway commissions, which allowed the Interstate system to serve the Tri-Cities without a great impact to direct traffic bound for Oregon. Its designation and general route, from I-82 in Prosser to US 12 (which replaced US 410 in 1967) east of Pasco, was approved by the American Association of State Highway Officials on June 23, 1969. The Washington State Highway Commission also approved the general corridor for I-182 on July 22; the state legislature codified the highway as State Route 182 in 1971. Construction on the 35-mile (56 km) freeway was scheduled to begin as early as 1971 if engineering work was accelerated, but was delayed by limited funding and disputed routing decisions.

The new freeway would use part of the Pasco Bypass, which opened on June 11, 1965, as part of US 410. Other sections were redesigned through route revisions prompted by local requests, particularly in Pasco after the governments of Richland and Benton County approved a tentative design for two interchanges in October 1970. The state's proposed alignment north of the Tri-Cities Airport was abandoned in favor of a southern route around the Columbia Basin College campus connecting to the Pasco Bypass. A proposed interchange on the east side of the proposed Columbia River bridge in western Pasco was also moved to Road 100 by the state highway commission.

An environmental impact statement (EIS) under the newly-enforceable National Environmental Policy Act (NEPA) was ordered for the project in early 1971 following protests from local conservation groups, such as the Lower Columbia Basin Audubon Society and Rattlesnake Hills chapter of the Sierra Club. They raised concerns on the impact of the proposed Columbia River bridge on wildlife, particularly waterfowl around nearby Columbia Point in the Yakima River Delta. They were joined by landowners protesting the routing of I-182 through farmland west of Richland, but were overruled by the Richland city council's endorsement of the Goose Gap corridor in April 1971. The conservationists and landowners threatened to file a lawsuit against the Washington State Department of Highways for violating the NEPA, but halted their plans to sue after negotiations with the state following delays in bidding for the Kiona section in early 1973. The state government promised to not commit to a Richland-area route as a result of these negotiations.

=== Route changes and funding ===
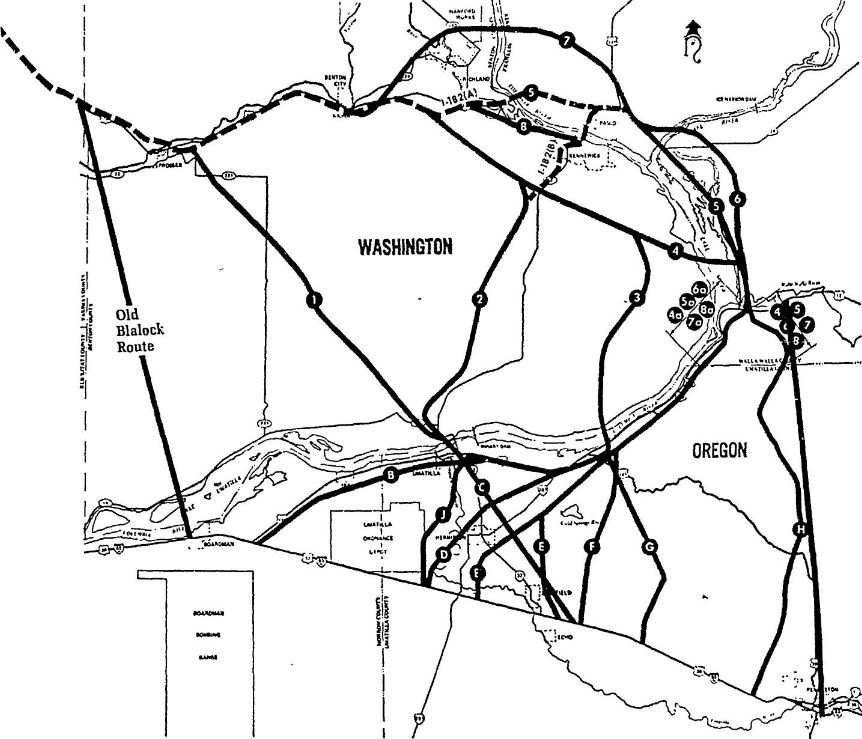
A map produced by the Tri-City Herald in 1974 showing routes considered for I-82 and I-182

The routing of I-182 also remained affected by the unresolved routing of I-82 between Prosser and Oregon; among the options considered were a full route through the Tri-Cities towards the Wallula Gap as well as routes in the Horse Heaven Hills with a north–south version of I-182 through Kennewick. A cross-state compromise was reached in late 1973, which allowed for I-82 to be routed through the Horse Heaven Hills to the southwest of the Tri-Cities and towards the Umatilla Bridge; a truncated version of I-182 would then run from an interchange near Badger Mountain to Pasco. The first freeway interchange built to Interstate Highway standards on the truncated section of I-182 was a full cloverleaf interchange at Oregon Avenue (now SR 397). It began construction in 1971 and opened in July 1973 as part of $2 million in improvements (equivalent to $11 million in 2024 dollars) to the Pasco Bypass funded by the state.

The Federal Highway Administration (successor to the BPR) granted full approval to the corridor for I-182 in December 1976 and estimated its full cost at $90 million (equivalent to $385 million in 2024 dollars); the EIS for the project and the Prosser–Oregon section of I-82 had been approved in October and the federal government found no significant impacts. The general design of I-182, including its interchanges and proposed location, were approved the following year after several public hearings and consultation with local governments. The Richland city government attempted to shift the location of the SR 240 interchange to the west side of the Yakima River, but withdrew those plans amid criticism from other local officials. In 1978, the Franklin County Board of Commissioners attempted to shift the Road 100 interchange east by 1,200 feet (370 m) to align with the existing road, which was opposed by local landowners who sought an angled interchange at Road 116 to serve future housing development. Following a study and several public hearings, the county commissioners voted the following year to confirm that the interchange location would follow Road 100; the vote was later upheld in a 1983 decision by the Washington Supreme Court following several appeals by opponents. The state government estimated that 37 homes, several warehouses, an adult movie theater, and part of a local golf course would need to be demolished or relocated to make way for the freeway.

Construction of I-182 was originally planned to be completed by 1979, but reduced revenue from the state's gas tax, meant to match the federal government's 90 percent contribution to Interstate construction funding, pushed back the start of construction by several years. Completion of I-182 was also delayed by a federal freeze on highway funding with major cutbacks on projects that had not begun construction ordered by the Carter administration in early 1980 due to a national inflation crisis. Washington received $55 million out of its requested $228 million allocation (equivalent to $175 million out of $726 million in 2024 dollars) for 1980, which caused planning delays on I-182 and other projects around the state. In June, former governor Albert D. Rosellini, as a member of the Washington State Transportation Commission, proposed earmarking all remaining federal funds to complete I-90 between Seattle and Bellevue while deferring other projects, but the commission rejected his proposal following public outcry.

The federal government released $150 million (equivalent to $478 million in 2024 dollars) of Washington's 1981 allocation in October 1980, which allowed for bidding to construct I-182 to begin amid the wait for more funding. The state legislature passed a law in March 1982 that would allow WSDOT (successor to the highways department) to sell short-term municipal bonds in order to resume stalled projects, including I-182, until the federal government would be able to allocate more funds. A five-cent national gas tax increase in 1983 allowed for $16 million (equivalent to $42 million in 2024 dollars) in restored funds to be allocated to Washington, which was earmarked for I-82, I-182, and I-90.

=== Construction ===
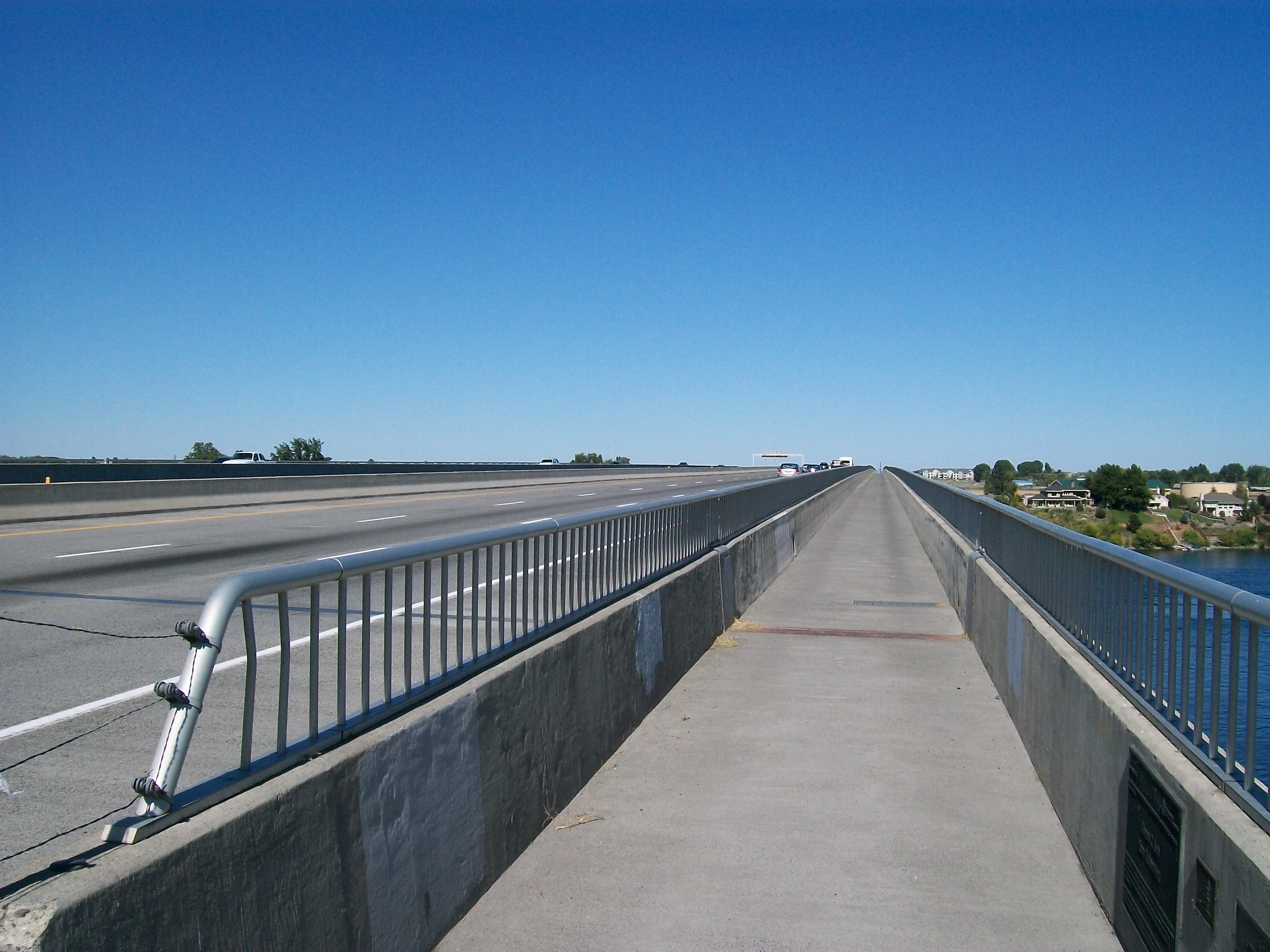
The Interstate 182 Bridge, which spans the Columbia River between Richland and Pasco, opened in November 1984.

Construction on I-182 was divided into three sections: the 7.6-mile (12.2 km) western half from I-82 to Road 100 in western Pasco with four interchanges, the 5.4-mile (8.7 km) eastern half from Road 100 to US 395 near the Columbia Basin College, and the existing Pasco Bypass carrying US 12 and US 395. In October 1980, construction on the first project in the western segment, the 824-foot (251 m) Yakima River Bridge (officially the R.C. Bremmer Bridge), began with the relocation of a nearby electrical line and railroad. The longer Columbia River Bridge broke ground on July 8, 1981, following three attempts to solicit construction bids, and was scheduled to be complete within three years.

Bidding on the Richland section of I-182 between the Yakima and Columbia rivers was delayed due to a months-long land dispute with the owner of a gravel pit on the site of a proposed interchange. The dispute was resolved with a tentative payment agreement in July 1981, which allowed construction to begin in April 1982. The section also included the partial closure of the city-owned Sham-Na-Pum golf course at Columbia Point, which was reconfigured to allow for continued play until its planned redevelopment into a shopping mall. The westbound span of the Yakima River Bridge opened for temporary use by two-way traffic in September 1983.

Construction on the east side of the river near Pasco began in early 1982; grading work on the West Pasco section was completed by the end of the year. The first overpass on I-182, which carried US 12 (now Kennedy Road) west of Richland, opened to traffic in April 1983. In April 1984, a section of SR 240 was rerouted onto the new lanes of I-182 in Richland in preparation for further work on the George Washington Way interchange. US 12 was redirected to a loop ramp at the Columbia Basin College interchange in June 1984, which caused complaints due to its slower speeds compared to the direct ramp that was to be demolished for the interchange. A 5-mile (8.0 km) section in Pasco between Road 100 and Columbia Basin College was completed in September 1984 but remained unopened for another month due to delays in light installation.

The Interstate 182 Bridge over the Columbia River, officially named the Lee–Volpentest Bridges, was dedicated on November 27, 1984. It cost $28 million (equivalent to $71 million in 2024 dollars) to construct and was the first major bridge in the state to use post-tensioned cast-in-place concrete. The north span of the bridge was initially opened to two-way traffic while work was completed on the south span, which took until 1986. The bridge's opening triggered new housing development in western Pasco, primarily to serve Hanford workers who saw large reductions in their commuting distance.

Paving of the westernmost section of I-182, between I-82 and Richland, began in July 1985 under the M.A. Segale Construction Company as part of the final phase of major construction for the freeway. The section was paved by the end of the year, but the freeway remained closed to traffic due to cold weather delaying final preparations for use. The Richland section between US 12 and George Washington Way was opened on January 8, 1986, following an additional delay while new signs were reinstalled after they had been knocked over in a windstorm. The I-82 interchange opened on March 27 and marked the full completion of I-182; the highways were opened on an accelerated schedule to be used as a detour during a long-term closure of the nearby Blue Bridge for re-decking.

=== Later projects ===
The completion of I-182 triggered plans for new commercial and residential development at its interchanges in the 1990s and early 2000s, particularly Kennedy Road (now Queensgate Drive) in Richland, Road 100 (renamed Broadmoor Boulevard in 1996) in western Pasco, and Road 68 in Pasco. The Queensgate Drive interchange was rebuilt from 2001 to 2005 at a cost of $2.3 million to add a westbound auxiliary lane on I-182 and a loop ramp for southbound traffic. Construction began in July 2001, and the loop ramp opened to traffic in October of that year; it was followed by the auxiliary lane, which was completed in November 2005. A second phase to add a matching ramp and auxiliary lane for eastbound traffic was left unfunded with a projected cost of $4.6 million. The city of Richland later replaced the east half of the interchange with a roundabout that opened in August 2018. The Broadmoor Boulevard interchange gained a westbound loop onramp in 2009, shortly after the city of Pasco completed improvements to the Road 68 loop ramps.

== Exit list ==
County	Location	mi	km	Exit	Destinations	Notes
Benton		0.00	0.00		I-82 / US 12 west – Prosser, Yakima, Umatilla, Pendleton	Western terminus, eastbound entrance and westbound exit, west end of US 12 overlap
Benton	Richland	2.93	4.72	3	Queensgate Drive	Signed as westbound exits 3A and 3B
Benton	Richland	3.83	6.16	4	SR 240 west / Wellsian Way – Vantage	West end of SR 240 overlap
Benton	Richland	4.95	7.97	5	SR 240 east / SR 240 Bus. west (George Washington Way) – Kennewick	Signed as exits 5A and 5B, east end of SR 240 overlap
Columbia River		5.87– 6.25	9.45– 10.06	Interstate 182 Bridge		
Franklin	Pasco	7.31	11.76	7	Broadmoor Boulevard	Signed as eastbound exits 7A and 7B
Franklin	Pasco	9.33	15.02	9	Road 68	
Franklin	Pasco	12.25	19.71	12A	US 395 south – Kennewick, Pendleton	West end of US 395 overlap
Franklin	Pasco	12.69	20.42	12B	North 20th Avenue – Columbia Basin College	
Franklin	Pasco	13.78	22.18	13	North 4th Avenue – City Center	
Franklin	Pasco	14.37	23.13	14	US 395 north / SR 397 south (Oregon Avenue) – Spokane, Finley	Signed as exits 14A and 14B, east end of US 395 overlap
Franklin	Pasco	15.19	24.45		US 12 east – Walla Walla	Eastern terminus, east end of US 12 overlap
1.000 mi = 1.609 km; 1.000 km = 0.621 mi: Concurrency terminus
