= Washington State Route 397 =

State highway in Washington, United States

State Route 397
- A map of the Tri-Cities with SR 397 highlighted in red.

Route information
- Auxiliary route of US 395
- Maintained by WSDOT
- Length: 22.31 mi (35.90 km)
- Existed: 1991–present

Major junctions
- South end: I-82 / US 395 near Finley
- North end: I-182 / US 12 / US 395 in Pasco

Location
- Country: United States
- State: Washington
- Counties: Benton, Franklin

Highway system
- State highways in Washington; Interstate; US; State; Scenic; Pre-1964; 1964 renumbering; Former
← US 395	→ SR 401

State Route 397 (SR 397) is a state highway in the U.S. state of Washington, serving the Tri-Cities region. It primarily functions as a truck route through industrial areas in Finley, Kennewick, and Pasco, running 22 miles (35 km) between junctions with Interstate 82 (I-82) and I-182. The highway crosses the Columbia River on the Cable Bridge, built in 1978 to replace an earlier bridge.

SR 397 was added to the state highway system in 1991, as a short route connecting Finley to Pasco. Two years later, the highway was extended further south into Finley. The remaining highway between I-82 and Finley in the Horse Heaven Hills was constructed by the state government and Benton County from 2004 to 2008 and was signed as part of SR 397 in 2009.

== Route description ==
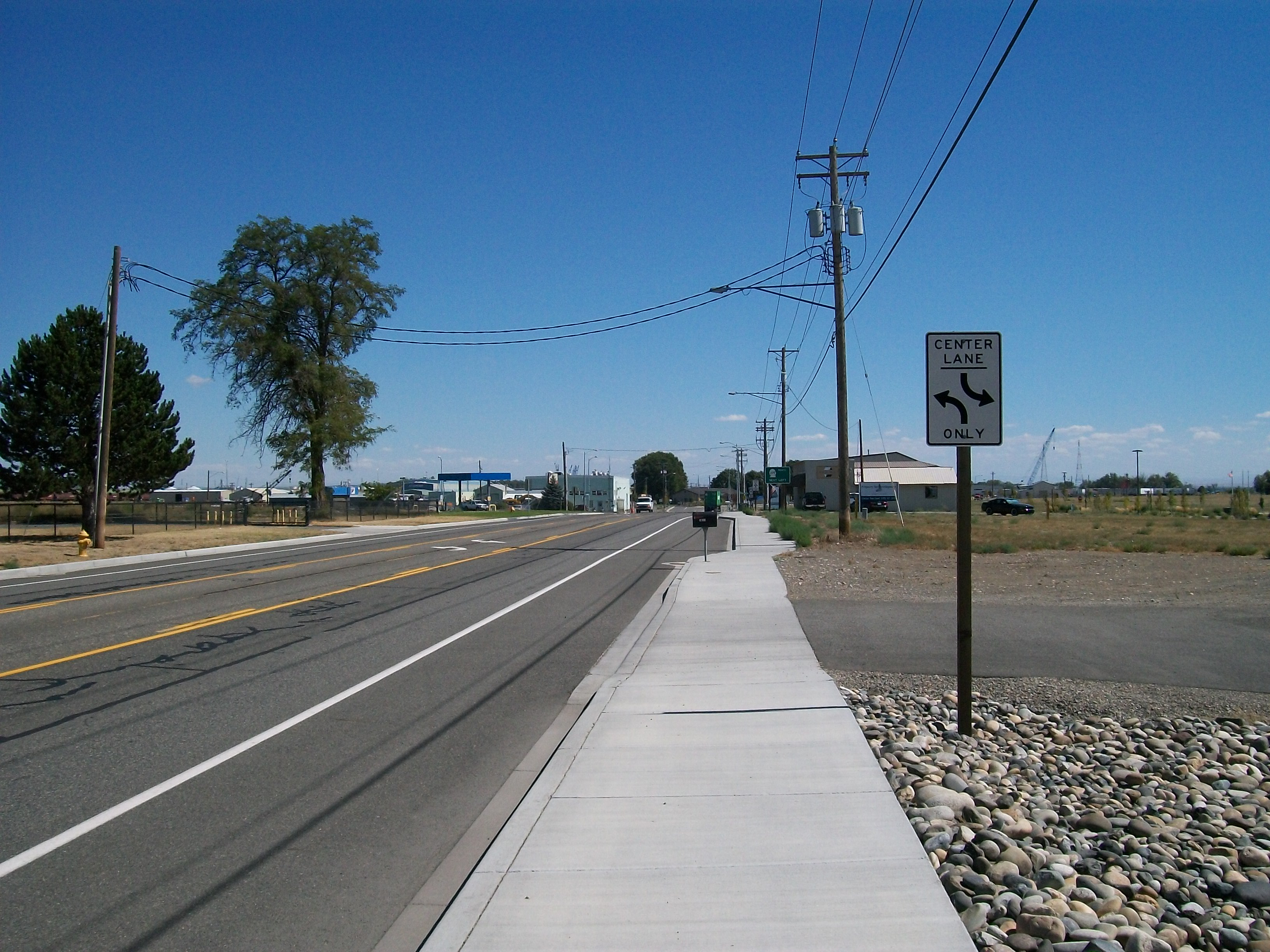
Looking eastbound on Ainsworth Street, which carries a section of SR 397 in Pasco

SR 397 begins at an interchange with I-82 and U.S. Route 395 (US 395) in the Horse Heaven Hills southwest of Kennewick. The highway runs east along the barren top of the ridge, arcing to the north, crossing several canyons and gullies, and traveling through several cuts in the hills. The road takes a turn north at Nine Canyon, descending into the predominantly rural Finley area. SR 397 turns east to cross an irrigation canal and a section of the Fallbridge Subdivision railroad operated by the BNSF Railway, which also carries Amtrak's Empire Builder service. After passing several chemical plants and industrial facilities on the west bank of the Columbia River, the highway turns northwest onto Chemical Road and follows the railroad into Kennewick.

The highway skirts the east side of downtown Kennewick, running along Gum Street through an industrial park on the north side of the railroad. Its main connection to downtown Kennewick is Columbia Drive, which continues west to Clover Island and the junction of US 395 and SR 240 near Columbia Park. SR 397 then crosses the Columbia River on the Cable Bridge (officially the Ed Hendler Bridge), the first modern cable-stayed bridge to be constructed in the United States. The bridge's north end is in Pasco (seat of Franklin County), where SR 397 turns east on Ainsworth Street and crosses over the BNSF Lakeside Subdivision before continuing north. The highway travels around the south and east edges of downtown Pasco on Oregon Avenue, serving the Port of Pasco industrial area and the east side of a railyard and the city's Amtrak station. SR 397 makes a gradual turn to the northeast before terminating at a cloverleaf interchange with I-182, US 12, and US 395 near the Tri-Cities Airport.

SR 397 is maintained by the Washington State Department of Transportation (WSDOT), which conducts an annual survey on the state's highways to measure traffic volume in terms of annual average daily traffic. The highway's daily vehicle counts range from a minimum of 760 vehicles in Nine Canyon to a maximum of 18,000 on the north side of the Cable Bridge.

== History ==
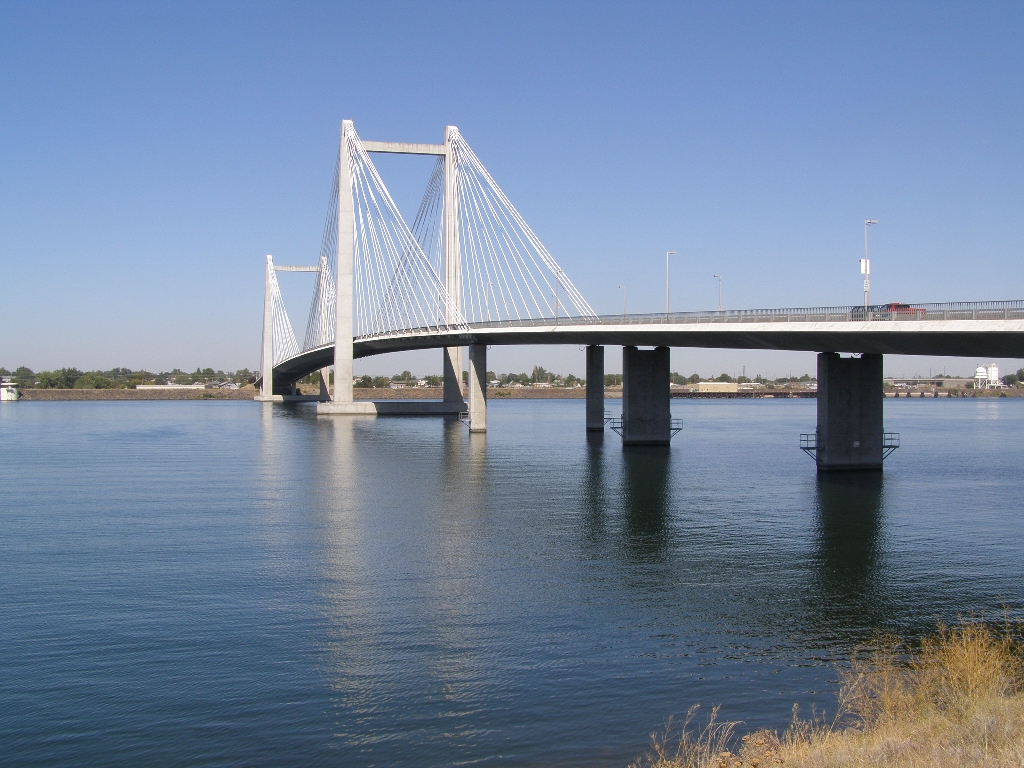
The Cable Bridge carries SR 397 across the Columbia River

The Cable Bridge, which carries SR 397 across the Columbia River, was opened on September 16, 1978, and built using $30 million in federal, county, and city funding (equivalent to $113 million in 2024 dollars). It replaced the "Green Bridge", which was built in 1922 and carried a section of the Inland Empire Highway (later part of US 410) until the opening of the Blue Bridge in 1954.

Chemical Road was built in the early 1960s to serve a number of new industrial facilities in Finley, following the general path of the Spokane, Portland and Seattle Railway towards Kennewick. The county government had previously considered paving nearby roads as early as the 1910s. The first section of Chemical Road was completed in 1961 by Benton County, at a cost of $237,000. Construction of a railroad underpass on Gum Street east of downtown Kennewick began the following year and was completed in September 1963, at a cost of $340,000. Additional railroad crossings were completed by 1965 and the road was renamed to Chemical Drive to conform with Kennewick's city guidelines.

The state legislature designated a state highway on Chemical Road and the Cable Bridge in 1991, numbering it SR 397. The road and bridge were transferred to state control in April 1992, originally terminating at Game Farm Road in central Finley. In 1993, SR 397 was extended south by one mile (1.6 km) to Piert Road following a request from WSDOT and Benton County that was endorsed by the Washington State Transportation Improvement Board and approved by the state legislature.

An east–west road connecting Finley to I-82 in southern Benton County was first proposed by the county government in 1961 to allow truck traffic to bypass the Tri-Cities. The 10-mile (16 km) highway, named the "intertie", was built with 12-foot (3.7 m) lanes and 6-foot (1.8 m) shoulders to accommodate truck traffic; additionally, several streets in Kennewick and Finley were extended to connect with the new road. The $15.4 million project was funded using a $5 million allocation from the legislature's 2003–05 transportation budget, as well as $4.3 million from the state gas tax, $3.7 million from Benton County, and additional funds from the Port of Kennewick and the federal government. The first phase, a 3.24-mile (5.21 km) section between I-82 and Olympia Street, began construction in March 2004 and was completed in October. The second phase, extending to Finley Road on the south side of Nine Canyon, began construction in 2005 and was completed in November 2006. The final phase, connecting to SR 397 in Finley via a railroad overpass, was completed on October 8, 2008. The highway was initially signed as a county route until it was transferred to the state by a legislative action in 2009 extended SR 397 to the Locust Road interchange.

== Major intersections ==
County	Location	mi	km	Destinations	Notes
Benton		0.00	0.00	I-82 / US 395 south – Pendleton, Yakima	Continues west as Locust Grove Road
Benton	Kennewick	17.90	28.81	To US 395 / SR 240 via Columbia Drive	
Columbia River		18.08– 18.56	29.10– 29.87	Cable Bridge	
Franklin	Pasco	22.31	35.90	I-182 west / US 12 / US 395 north – Richland, Walla Walla, Lewiston, Spokane	Continues north as US 395
1.000 mi = 1.609 km; 1.000 km = 0.621 mi
