= Harold H. Ginnold =

American architect

Harold Horatio Ginnold
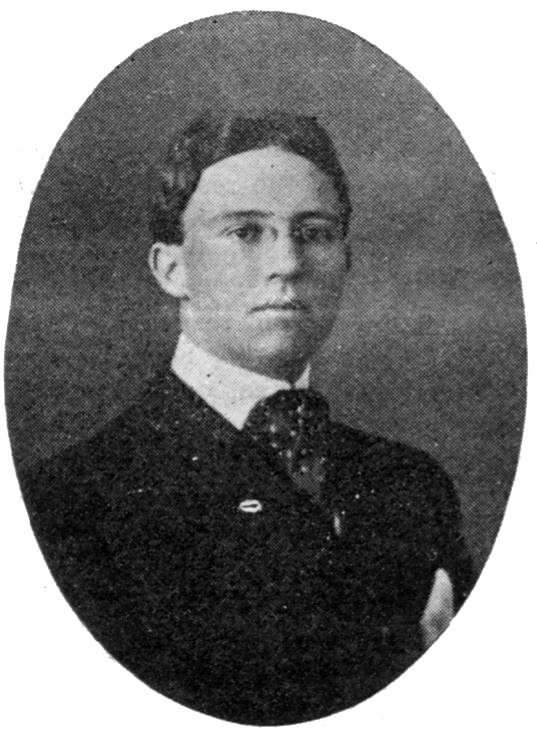
- Portrait of Harold Ginnold c. 1907
- Born: April 29, 1886; Evergreen, Colorado
- Died: June 14, 1959 (aged 73)
- Occupation: Architect
- Spouse: Hypatia Dermul (m. 1907)
- Children: Richard Ginnold

Harold Horatio Ginnold^{Note 1} (April 29, 1886^{Note 2} – June 14, 1959) was an American architect active from the 1910s to 1940s, primarily in the Pacific Northwest. He designed Carnegie Libraries, courthouses, schools, and other buildings. Many of his projects are now listed on the National Register of Historic Places, as well as the Washington State Heritage Register.

== Life and career ==
Harold Ginnold was born in Jefferson County, Colorado, and moved with his family to California shortly thereafter. He arrived in Seattle in 1902, and in 1907, he married Hypatia Dermul of Port Angeles.

On arriving in Seattle, Harold Ginnold found employment with architects James Schack, Harlan Thomas, and as a partner at C. Lewis Wilson & Company. During this period, he worked on many large projects, including on county courthouses and Carnegie libraries, several of which became listed historic properties. He entered private practice in 1914, which he maintained until 1933. While in private practice, he designed several buildings in and around Port Angeles, Washington including the Lincoln School, it's 1922 expansion, and schools in Forks, Beaver, Blyn and Joyce.

He left private practice in 1933, and became the in-house architect for the Construction Quartermasters office at Fort Lewis, now Joint Base Lewis-McChord. He also worked with the Civilian Conservation Corps in the 1930s. In 1946, he moved to San Francisco, California to serve as the Veterans Administration's chief of construction services for their San Francisco office.

Harold Ginnold died in San Mateo County, California in 1956.

== Buildings ==
Media related to Buildings designed by Harold H. Ginnold at Wikimedia Commons
Query for Items where "architect" statement has value of "Harold Ginnold" at Wikidata.

Select buildings designed by Harold H. Ginnold
Year	Building	Location	Notes	Image
1911	Pacific County Courthouse	South Bend	Listed on the National Register of Historic Places. As partner at C. Lewis Wilson and Company	
1911	Pasco Carnegie Library	Pasco	Listed on the National Register of Historic Places. As partner at C. Lewis Wilson and Company	
1913	Franklin County Courthouse	Pasco	Listed on the National Register of Historic Places. As partner at C. Lewis Wilson and Company	
1913	Port Townsend Carnegie Library	Port Townsend	Listed on the National Register of Historic Places. As partner at C. Lewis Wilson and Company	
1914	Kuppler Building	Port Angeles	Possibly the first building Ginnold designed while in private practice.	
1916	Beaver School	Clallam County	Listed on the National Register of Historic Places.	
1916	Lincoln School	Port Angeles	Ginnold was the architect for both the 1916 construction and 1922 expansion of the school.	
1919	Port Angeles Carnegie Library	Port Angeles	Listed on the National Register of Historic Places as a contributing property.	

== Notes ==
^Note 1 : Some sources record Ginnold's last name as "Grinnold", occasionally using both spellings in the same source. Some sources also record his first name as "Haral."

^Note 2 : While both Houser and Ochsner record Ginnold's date of birth as April 29, 1886, the Pacific Coast Architectural Database reports ambiguity as to his date of birth in the primary source documents.

== Additional resources ==
- Many of Harold Ginnold's projects were documented in Pacific Builder and Engineer; the Seattle Public Library maintains scans of some editions here.
- The University of Washington library system maintains architectural drawings of several of Harold Ginnold's projects, some are available here.
