= Interstate 182 Bridge =

Highway bridge between Richland and Pasco, Washington, U.S.

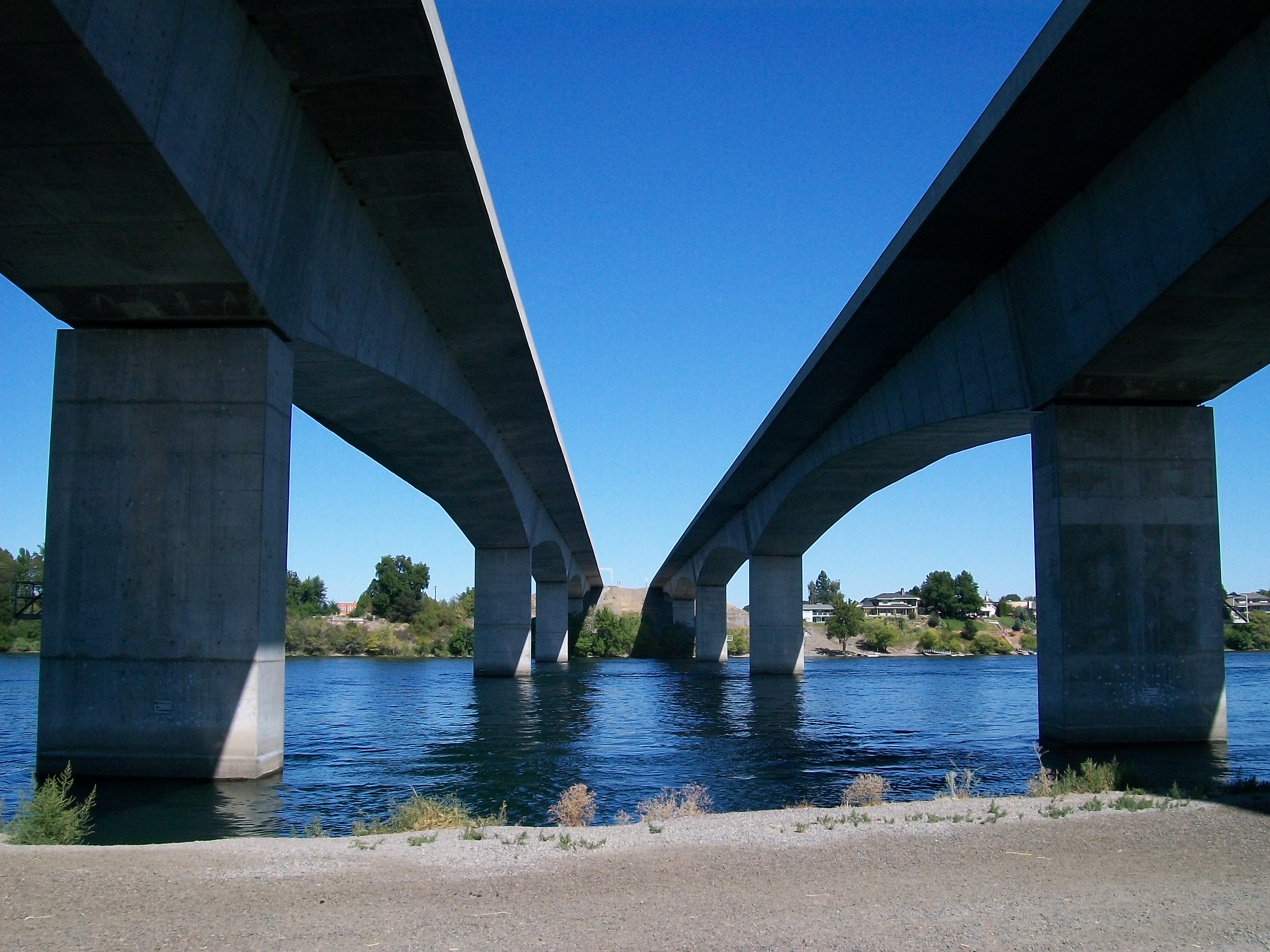
- Coordinates: 46°15′53″N 119°14′33″W
- Carries: 6 lanes of I-182 / US 12 and Sacagawea Heritage Trail
- Crosses: Columbia River
- Locale: Pasco–Richland, Washington, U.S.
- Official name: Lee–Volpentest Bridges
- Maintained by: Washington State Department of Transportation

Characteristics
- Design: Concrete arch
- Total length: 1,950 ft (594.4 m)

History
- Opened: November 27, 1984

Statistics
- Daily traffic: 64,000 (2016)

The Interstate 182 (I-182) Bridge, officially the Lee–Volpentest Bridges, is the collective name for a pair of bridges carrying Interstate 182 over the Columbia River between Pasco and Richland in the U.S. state of Washington. They are named after Glenn C. Lee, publisher of the Tri-City Herald, and Sam Volpentest, a prominent local businessman. It is one of three bridges connecting Pasco to the other members of the Tri-Cities of Washington (Kennewick and Richland), along with the Cable Bridge and the Blue Bridge.

== History ==
In 1894 the Timmerman ferry started operation at this site and continued operation until 1931. The city of Richland, which grew rapidly beginning in the 1940s due to its proximity to the Hanford Site, proposed a bridge over the Columbia River to Pasco several times in the decade following the ferry's shutdown. Most proposals in the 1960s and 1970s focused on a location north of the city at Horn Rapids Road to allow Hanford commuters to bypass the city. After Interstate 182 was approved in 1969, proposals remained for a separate, tolled crossing north of the city to be built in tandem with the interstate bridge.

Preliminary work at the bridge site, including soil tests, began in early 1978. Ground was broken on the I-182 Bridge on July 8, 1981, with construction expected to be finished in late 1984 at a cost of $23.8 million. It was the first bridge in the state to be built with post-tensioned cast-in-place concrete, which progressed from each side of the river. Work was delayed by approximately 90 days due to the discovery of faulty bridge bearings, which were replaced at a cost of $600,000 (of which $240,000 was paid by the state government). The final concrete pour was completed on June 26, 1984. The westbound span was dedicated and opened to two-way traffic on November 27, 1984. The eastbound span opened in early 1986.

The bridge was named for Tri-City Herald publisher Glenn C. Lee and businessman Sam Volpentest, both prominent members of the Tri-City Nuclear Industrial Council and advocates for local highway projects. Others suggested for the bridge's namesake included Pasco lobbyist George L. Cook, U.S. Senator Warren G. Magnuson, and Tri-City Herald editor Donald Pugnetti.

During construction of the bridge on May 17, 1983, a crane collapsed and killed a foreman. The bridge was unofficially dedicated as the John K. Seward Memorial Bridge by other construction workers in his honor. A memorial plaque was installed in lieu of naming the bridge for the foreman.

== See also ==
- Blue Bridge (Washington) carries US 395 over the Columbia River.
- Cable Bridge carries SR 397 over the Columbia River.
- Duportail Bridge carries Richland's Duportail Street over the Yakima River.
