= Ben Franklin Transit =

Washington state public transportation operator

- Founded: 1981
- Headquarters: 1000 Columbia Park Trail; Richland, Washington
- Service area: Tri-Cities, Washington
- Service type: Transit, Paratransit
- Routes: 22
- Hubs: 7
- Fleet: 71 (fixed-route)
- Daily ridership: 24,200 (weekdays, Q2 2026)
- Annual ridership: 3,625,000 (2025)
- Fuel type: Diesel, battery-electric
- Chief executive: Brian Lubanski
- Website: bft.org

Ben Franklin Transit is the a public transit system in the Tri-Cities region of southeastern Washington in the United States. It covers Benton and Franklin counties, which include the cities of Richland, Kennewick, and Pasco. The system has 22 routes within these cities and other areas of the two counties that run seven days a week. A dial-a-ride system provides paratransit service for customers with disabilities who are unable to use the regular transit bus service. In 2025, the system had a ridership of 3,625,000, or about 24,200 per weekday as of the second quarter of 2026.

== History ==
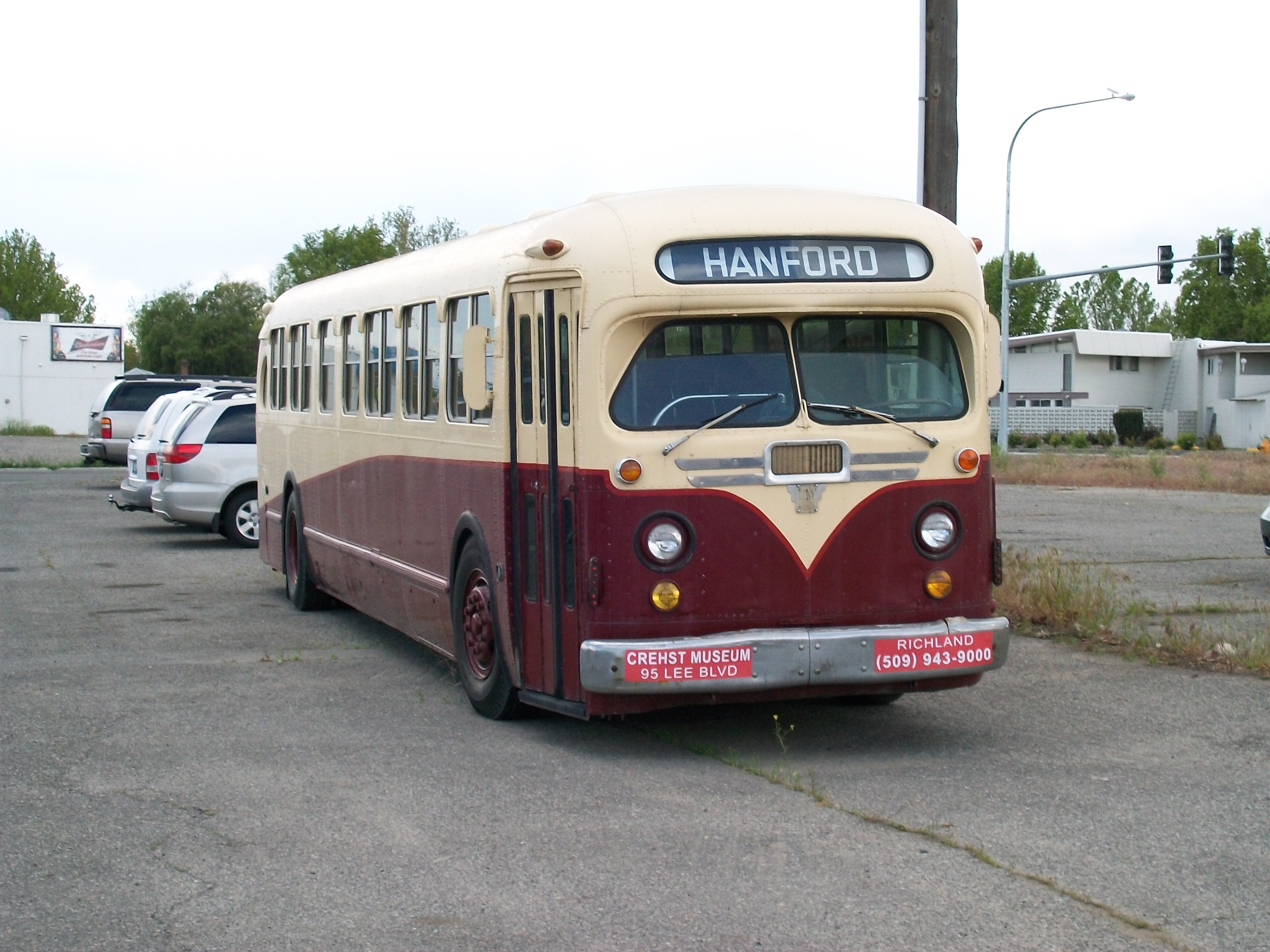
A former U.S. Department of Energy commuter bus that served the Hanford Site

The roots of public transportation in the Tri-Cities region can be traced back to the beginnings of the Hanford Site, which was opened in 1943 in the midst of World War II, and ultimately produced the plutonium used in the Fat Man bomb that was detonated over Nagasaki, Japan. General Electric, and later the Atomic Energy Commission, provided bus service to bring its workers to and from the Hanford site to locales in the area, largely Richland.

On April 4, 1978, Benton County voters were asked to vote on a proposed countywide bus system that would be operated by the Benton County Transit Authority and financed by a 0.3 percent sales tax. It was defeated by a 3–1 margin by voters after an opposition campaign by Rockwell Hanford drivers, who feared they would lose their jobs if the proposal passed. The public transportation benefit area (PTBA) officials later passed a resolution that the bus system would not compete with Rockwell Hanford. A bus system proposal was brought to the voters again two years later; the proposed service area was scaled back to just Kennewick and Richland in Benton County and expanded to include Pasco in neighboring Franklin County.

The Benton–Franklin Public Transportation Benefit Area was approved by voters on May 19, 1981, and funded by a 0.3 percent sales tax. The system was named Ben Franklin Transit in August to reflect the two constituent counties. Ben Franklin Transit began service on May 10, 1982, and carried 2,043 total riders on its first day. Ridership continued to slowly grow after that, as more routes were launched and more buses were put into service. Ben Franklin Transit would later buy out the Bassett Transit franchise, which had operated commuter bus service to the unsecured portions of the Hanford site, primarily the Energy Northwest Nuclear Power Plant. Residents of Benton City and Prosser voted to be annexed into the Ben Franklin Transit system in November 1997. Prosser Rural Transit, an independent system that began operations in 1977, continued to run until Ben Franklin Transit fully absorbed it in April 1998. The first buses to Benton City began operation on July 13, 1998.

Voters in the PTBA approved a March 2002 ballot measure to raise the sales tax by an additional 0.3 percent. The system annexed Finley into the service area in April 2005 after a campaign led by two high school students. In 2007, Ben Franklin Transit was awarded the Governor's Award for Sustainable Practices.

== Fleet ==
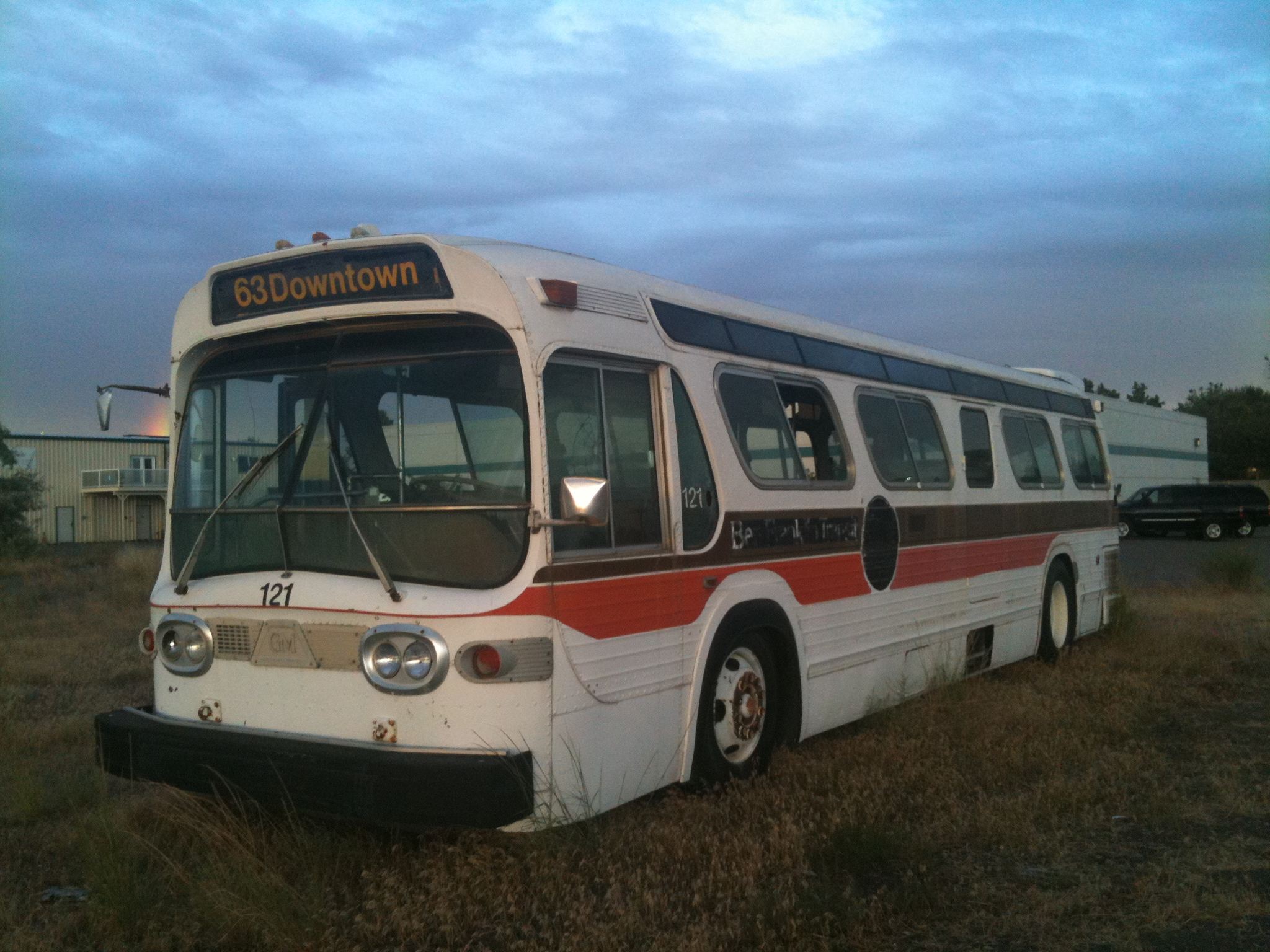
GM New Look, used in the early years of Ben Franklin Transit

Originally operating with a fleet that largely consisted of used GM New Look buses bought from the Minneapolis, MN MTC (Metropolitan Transit Commission), Ben Franklin Transit put out a bid in 1987 for 30 new buses. After some delays, mainly due to cost and budget constraints at the time, the $4.5 million bid was awarded to Gillig Corporation, which would build a total of thirty-three Gillig Phantom coaches (6 30 ft and 27 35 ft) at a cost of $135,759 each. In 1992, Gillig also won the contract to provide Ben Franklin Transit with eight 40-foot coaches, which had been specified in the original order, but were delayed due to cost. All subsequent bids afterwards for town coaches have been awarded to Gillig, with the exception of the nine Optima Opus coaches purchased in 2003–2004.

=== O2Diesel ===
In 2006, Ben Franklin Transit entered into an agreement with O2Diesel to test a blended fuel that included both bio-diesel and ethanol. This experiment lasted for approximately 1 year but was ended due to cost and supply problems.

=== ZEPS EBus ===
An electric bus from Complete Coach Works, converted from a 2005 Gillig Low Floor, was introduced to service in mid-2013. It primarily operated during weekday peak hours on the 23/26 pair. In a press release, CCW announced a new battery pack that is being retrofitted into this bus.

== Service ==
There are 18 bus routes which serve a specific local area, as well as routes which provide a connection between the cities. An on-demand microtransit service, BFT Connect, operates in six zones around the Tri-Cities. Ben Franklin Transit operates a dial-a-ride system for paratransit service that accommodates customers with disabilities who are unable to use the regular transit bus service.

The KML file gives a rough approximation of the service area. The PTBA boundary is contiguous with populated areas and with many voting precincts that fill in the gaps.

No.	Area served	Transit Center(s)	Route description (Local) Cities Served (Regional & Rural)	Service Days	Notes
Metro 1	Regional	Three Rivers Transit Center, 22nd Avenue Transit Center	Pasco, Kennewick	Sunday to Saturday	
Metro 2	Regional	Richland ↔ Pasco (CBC & Airport)	Pasco, Kennewick	Sunday to Saturday	
Metro 3	Regional	22nd Avenue Transit Center, Dayton Transfer Point	Pasco, Kennewick	Sunday to Saturday	
20	Richland Local	West Richland Transit Center, Richland Transit Center	Thayer, Van Giesen	Monday to Saturday	
25	Richland Local	Knight Street Transit Center	Wright, Stevens	Monday to Saturday	
26	Richland Local	Knight Street Transit Center	George Washington Way	Monday to Saturday	
40	Kennewick Local	Three Rivers Transit Center, Dayton Transfer Point	Kennewick Avenue Crosstown	Monday to Saturday	
41	Kennewick Local	Dayton Transfer Point	Central Kennewick Circulator	Monday to Saturday	
42	Kennewick Local	Three Rivers Transit Center, Dayton Transfer Point	4th Crosstown	Sunday to Saturday	
47	Kennewick Local	Three Rivers Transit Center, Dayton Transfer Point	27th Crosstown	Monday to Saturday	
48	Kennewick Local	Three Rivers Transit Center, Dayton Transfer Point	10th Crosstown	Monday to Saturday	
64	Pasco Local	22nd Avenue Transit Center	Lewis Street, S Elm, Lakeview, Amazon	Sunday to Saturday	
65	Pasco Local	22nd Avenue Transit Center	Sylvester, N Elm, Tierra Vida	Monday to Saturday	
67	Pasco Local	22nd Avenue Transit Center	Sandifur Parkway	Monday to Saturday	
110	Rural	West Richland Transit Center, Three Rivers Transit Center	Kennewick, Richland, West Richland	Monday to Saturday	
123	Regional	Three Rivers Transit Center, Knight Street Transit Center	Richland, Kennewick	Sunday to Saturday	
170	Rural	Prosser (Stacy Street) Transit Center, Benton City Park & Ride, Knight Street Transit Center	Richland, Benton City, Prosser	Monday to Saturday	
225	Regional	22nd Avenue Transit Center, Knight Street Transit Center	Pasco, Richland	Sunday to Saturday	
268	Regional	22nd Avenue Transit Center, Knight Street Transit Center	Pasco, Richland	Monday to Friday	

== Fares ==
Fares are either exact cash, a pre-purchased ticket or a pass. Upon payment of fare, a transfer valid for 3 hours after arrival at the next transit center can be requested. A day pass is also available from the driver.
