= Cable Bridge =

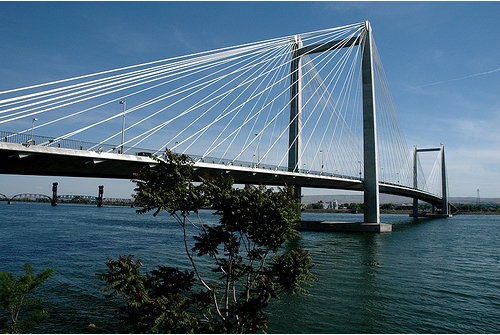
- Coordinates: 46°13′6.25″N 119°6′13.73″W
- Carries: Four lanes of SR 397, Sacagawea Heritage Trail
- Crosses: Columbia River
- Locale: Pasco–Kennewick, Washington
- Official name: Ed Hendler Bridge
- Maintained by: Washington State Dept. of Transportation
- ID number: 085555000000000

Characteristics
- Design: Cable-stayed bridge
- Total length: 2,503 ft (762.9 m)
- Width: 80 ft (24.4 m)
- Longest span: 981 ft (299.0 m)
- Clearance below: 48 ft (14.6 m)

History
- Designer: John Clark, Arvid Grant, Holger Svensson
- Opened: September 8, 1978

Statistics
- Daily traffic: 16,129 (2012), 8,279 (1994)

Location
- Interactive map of Cable Bridge

The Cable Bridge, officially called the Ed Hendler Bridge and sometimes called the Intercity Bridge, spans the Columbia River between Pasco and Kennewick in southeastern Washington as State Route 397. It was constructed in 1978 and replaced the Pasco–Kennewick Bridge, an earlier span built in 1922 and demolished in 1990.

The bridge is one of seven major bridge structures in the Tri-Cities area. The Blue Bridge (another Pasco/Kennewick bridge), the Interstate 182 Bridge that connects Pasco with Richland, the U.S. Highway 12 bridge over the Snake River (Pasco/Burbank), and three railroad bridges are the others. However, the Cable Bridge is the only bridge that carries traffic that is not a freeway.

It was dedicated on September 8, 1978, and was inaccurately claimed to be the first major cable-stayed bridge to be built in the United States (and second-longest of its kind in the world at the time) but was built after the Sitka Harbor Bridge, constructed in 1971. It was constructed almost entirely of prestressed concrete, beginning with the towers and followed by the bridge deck, which was cast in individual segments, raised up and secured to each other.

The bridge was named after Ed Hendler, a Pasco insurance salesman, as well as the city's former mayor, who headed up the committee responsible for obtaining the funding for construction of the bridge. Hendler died in August 2001.

A controversial feature of the bridge was added in 1998, when lights were added to illuminate the bridge at night. Many thought this was unnecessary and a waste of both electricity and money. During a power crisis in 2000, the lights were turned off, but they were turned on for one night to honor Hendler's passing. Now the lights are turned on at night, and turned off at 2 am.

In March 2007, the old guardrail system on the bridge, which consisted of steel cables, was replaced with a more rigid system, consisting of steel rails bolted to the original system's mounts on the bridge deck.

== The bridge as a status symbol ==
The Cable Bridge, from the time of its opening, is considered a landmark and symbol of the Tri-Cities. Every winter, an event known as the Lampson Cable Bridge Run, including mile, five-kilometer, and 10-kilometer foot races, starts at the Kennewick end of the bridge near the Lampson International headquarters. All three share the same starting line. The five- and 10-kilometer events share an indoor finish line at the Lampson Maintenance Shop, while the 1-mile has its own outdoor finish.

At the foot of the Kennewick end is the Tri-Cities Vietnam Veterans Memorial, which has engraved on it the names of the area's dead. The remaining pier of the old Pasco–Kennewick bridge, which was replaced by the Cable Bridge, now serves as a scenic lookout, from which one can view the more recent bridge.

The bridge's sodium vapor lights are planned to be replaced with programmable LEDs that would be able to change color for special events.
