= B. B. Horrigan =

American politician

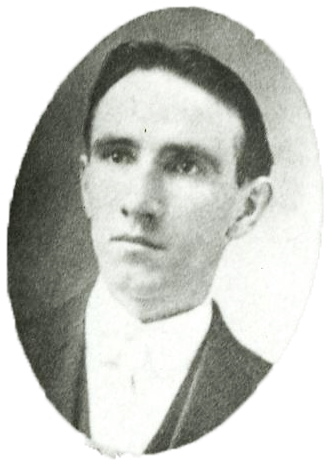
- Horrigan in 1913

Member of the Washington House of Representatives for the 14th district
- In office 1911–1915

Personal details
- Born: August 28, 1880 Minnesota, United States
- Died: August 5, 1970 (aged 89) Pasco, Washington, United States
- Party: Democratic

Bartholomew Bertram Horrigan (August 28, 1880 – August 5, 1970) was an American politician in the state of Washington. He served in the Washington House of Representatives.
