= Duportail Bridge =

- Coordinates: 46°15′51″N 119°18′23″W
- Carries: Four lanes of Duportail Street
- Crosses: Yakima River; Columbia Canal
- Locale: Richland, Washington
- Maintained by: City of Richland

Characteristics
- Total length: 0.67 miles (1.08 km)
- No. of spans: 5

History
- Constructed by: Apollo Construction
- Construction start: February 28, 2018
- Construction cost: $38.5 million (2016)
- Opened: December 16, 2020

Location
- Interactive map of Duportail Bridge

The Duportail Bridge is a four-lane bridge in Richland, Washington, United States, over the Yakima River and Columbia Canal. It opened on December 16, 2020, and connects the Queensgate area with downtown Richland via Duportail Street.

== History ==
Construction of the Duportail Bridge was Richland's top priority since at least 2007. For individuals to get between Richland's center and the Queensgate-area, they had to travel on I-182. In 2016, the bridge carrying I-182 over the Yakima River carried an average of 54,000 vehicles a day. The new bridge was expected to remove thousands of vehicles from this load.

Official planning for the bridge began in 2011, but encountered several roadblocks before construction began. After the job was awarded to Apollo Construction, another bidder, N.A. Degerstrom from Spokane filed an injunction. That injunction was lifted a few days later, allowing Richland to officially award the contract in January 2018.

== Funding ==
The City of Richland went through several avenues to secure funding to build the bridge. In 2014, it applied for a federal grant that would have paid for the entire cost. In the application, the city listed a number of benefits including decreased air pollution, less traffic deaths, and saving up to $30 million in improvements to I-182. That application was later denied, forcing the city to seek other sources for funding.

Over $30 million was provided by the state government to complete the bridge, with approximately $2 million coming from federal sources. The majority of the state funding came from an 11.9 cent increase in the state's gas tax, with a smaller portion being allotted for improvements to the intersection at State Route 240.

Another source for funding was through car tabs. Richland established a Transportation Benefit District to levee a $20 fee that is added to the cost of a resident's annual car registration. This licensing fee was expected to raise $875,000 in the first year. Of that $20 fee, $3 goes directly to the construction costs of the bridge. This fee is expected to be removed in 2039.

== Construction ==
Construction on the bridge officially began in March 2018 and was expected to continue until 2020. The project was split into two phases, the bridge itself and improvements to the intersection of State Route 240 and Duportail Street. The project also added traffic lights to the intersection of Duportail and Tanglewood Drive on the east side of the river. A water pipeline, currently running beneath the Yakima River, was replaced with the new line crossing the bridge.

Portions of the building involving the river were restricted to the summer months due to state and federal regulations. These regulations are in place to make it easier for fish to migrate through the channel. During construction, access to the Yakima River and trails around it was restricted. Richland set up detours for recreational trails, and suggested that boaters use boat launches that are either upstream or downstream of the construction site.

The bridge opened to traffic on December 16, 2020.
