= Franklin County Courthouse (Washington) =

- U.S. National Register of Historic Places
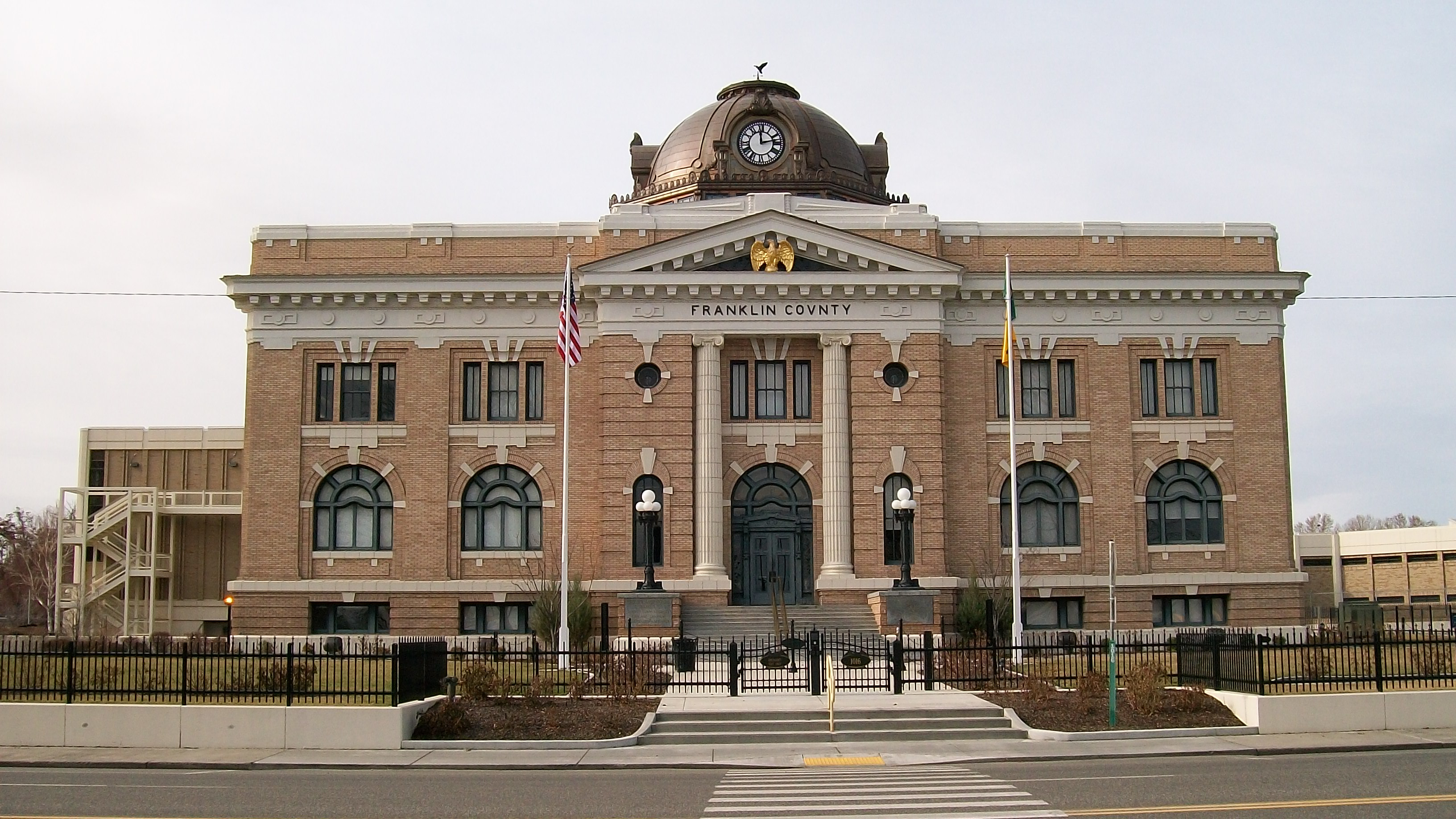

- Location within Washington (state) Location within the United States
- Interactive map showing the location of Franklin County Courthouse
- Location: 1016 N. 4th St., Pasco, Washington
- Coordinates: 46.237222°N 119.095556°W
- Area: less than one acre
- Built: 1912-13
- Architect: C. Wilson Lewis and Co.
- Architectural style: Late 19th and 20th Century Revivals, Second Renaissance Revival
- NRHP reference No.: 78002740
- Added to NRHP: February 8, 1978

The Franklin County Courthouse in Pasco, Washington is a historic courthouse which was built in 1912–13. It was listed on the National Register of Historic Places in 1978.

== Overview ==
It is located at 1016 N. 4th St. in Pasco.

It was designed by architects C. Lewis Wilson and Company, of Seattle, Centralia and Chehalis.

Its "central rotunda interior is the most arresting space .... The creme colored marble coupled with azure and gold accents provide a space that is at once comfortable and elegant."
