= Blue Bridge (Washington) =

Four-lane arch-truss bridge

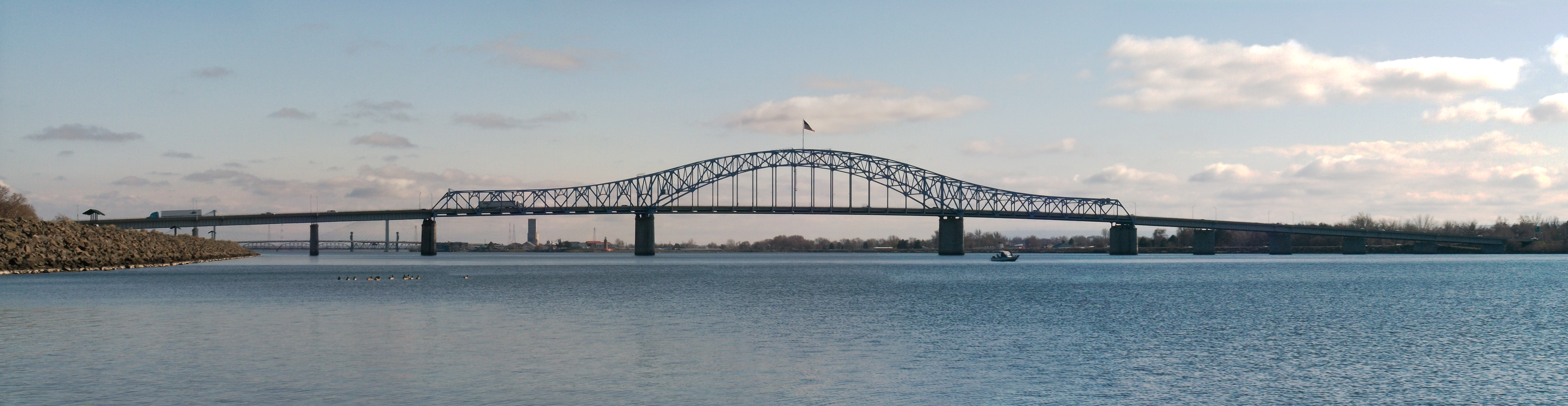
- Coordinates: 46°13′29.92″N 119°8′8.52″W
- Carries: Four lanes of US 395
- Crosses: Columbia River
- Locale: Kennewick-Pasco, Washington
- Official name: Pioneer Memorial Bridge
- Maintained by: Washington State Dept. of Transportation

Characteristics
- Design: Through arch shaped Truss bridge
- Material: Concrete/steel
- Total length: 2,520 ft (768.1 m)
- Width: 63 ft (19.2 m)

History
- Construction start: September 19, 1951
- Opened: July 30, 1954
- Pioneer Memorial Bridge – Blue Bridge
- U.S. National Register of Historic Places
- Nearest city: Kennewick, Washington
- Built: 1954
- Built by: PJ Jarvis, Inc.; Cascade Construction Company; Robert W. Austin Company
- MPS: Bridges and Tunnels Built in Washington State, 1951-1960
- NRHP reference No.: 02000241
- Added to NRHP: February 7, 2002

Location
- Interactive map of Blue Bridge

The Blue Bridge (officially named the Pioneer Memorial Bridge) is a four-lane arch-truss bridge connecting Pasco, Washington to Kennewick, Washington. U.S. Route 395 crosses the Columbia River via this bridge. The name comes from the blue paint used on the truss superstructure, with white paint on the suspension beams. The bridge was painted green at time of construction (green being the state color of Washington). It is one of three bridges connecting Pasco to the other members of the Tri-Cities of Washington (Kennewick and Richland), along with the Cable Bridge to the east and the Interstate 182 Bridge from Richland to the northwest.

== History ==
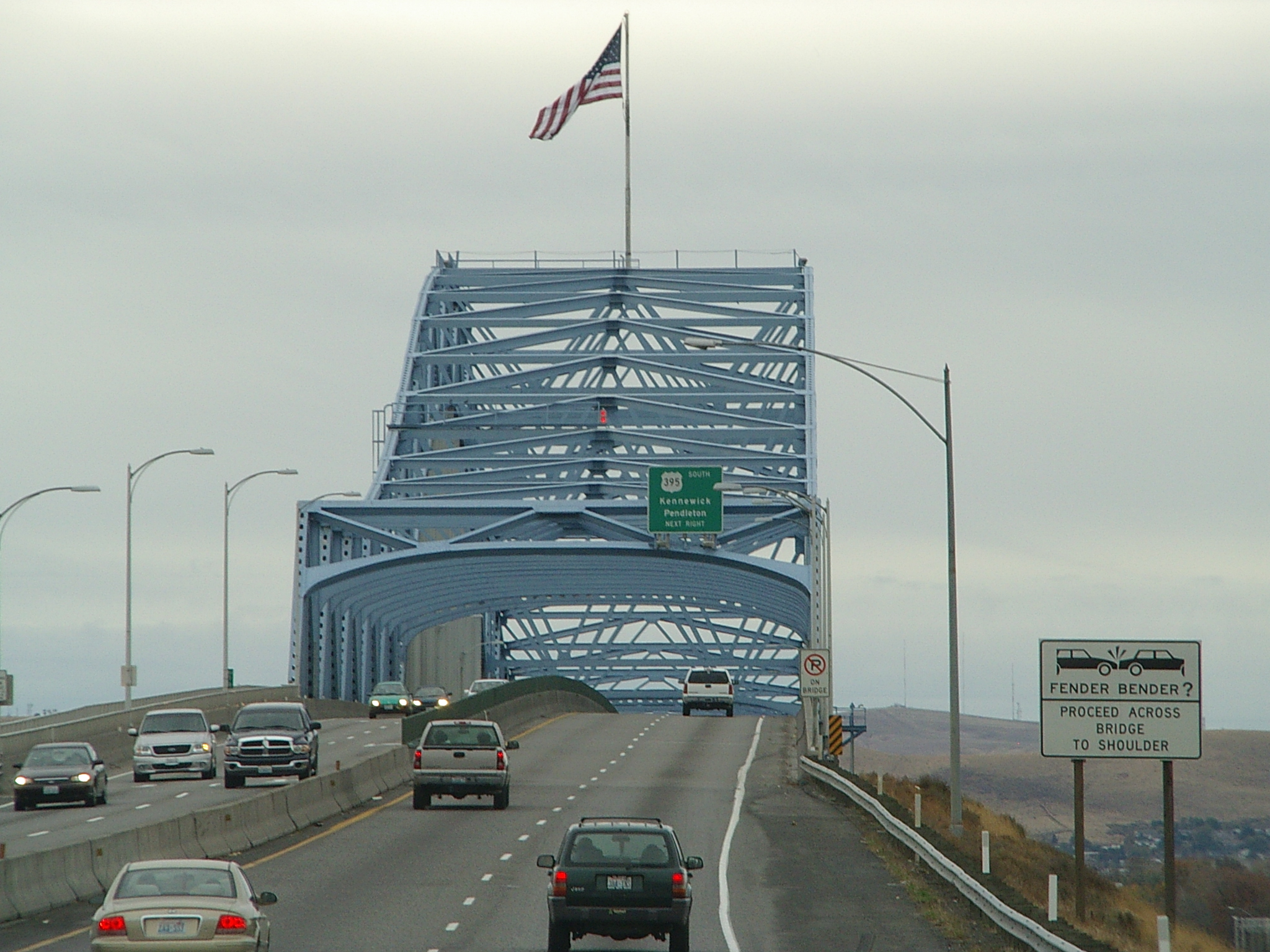
View from roadway

The bridge was first proposed in 1949 as the previous bridge (commonly referred to as the "Green Bridge") was unable to handle the 10,000+ cars that were crossing it daily. Work on the bridge was begun on September 19, 1951. Work was completed in the summer of 1954 with a total cost of about $7.1 million. The bridge was dedicated without an official name on July 30, 1954. The "Pioneer Memorial Bridge" moniker was chosen in a radio contest in 1967, but locals used their own nicknames. After the bridge was repainted from green to blue, the "Blue Bridge" moniker became the most popular among Tri-City residents. A 15-by-25-foot (4.6 by 7.6 m) United States flag flies atop the bridge, which was added during the re-decking of the bridge in 1986 through a donation drive sponsored by the Shriners.

In 2002, the bridge was listed on the National Register of Historic Places.

During rush hour, the junction of U.S Route 395 and State Route 240 on the southbound side of the bridge is especially crowded. Late in 2005, it was announced that funding had been obtained in order to remedy the situation, by modifying the approaches and exits to the bridge, especially at the Highway 395 southbound exit on the Kennewick side of the bridge. This included constructing two roundabouts in place of the usual cloverleaf pattern. Construction began February 23 and was completed in October 2009.

A year-long repainting and repair project lasted from January 2024 to January 2025, with traffic restrictions from February to December. The bridge was repainted in the same Air Force Blue color as before.
