= Finley, Washington =

- CDP
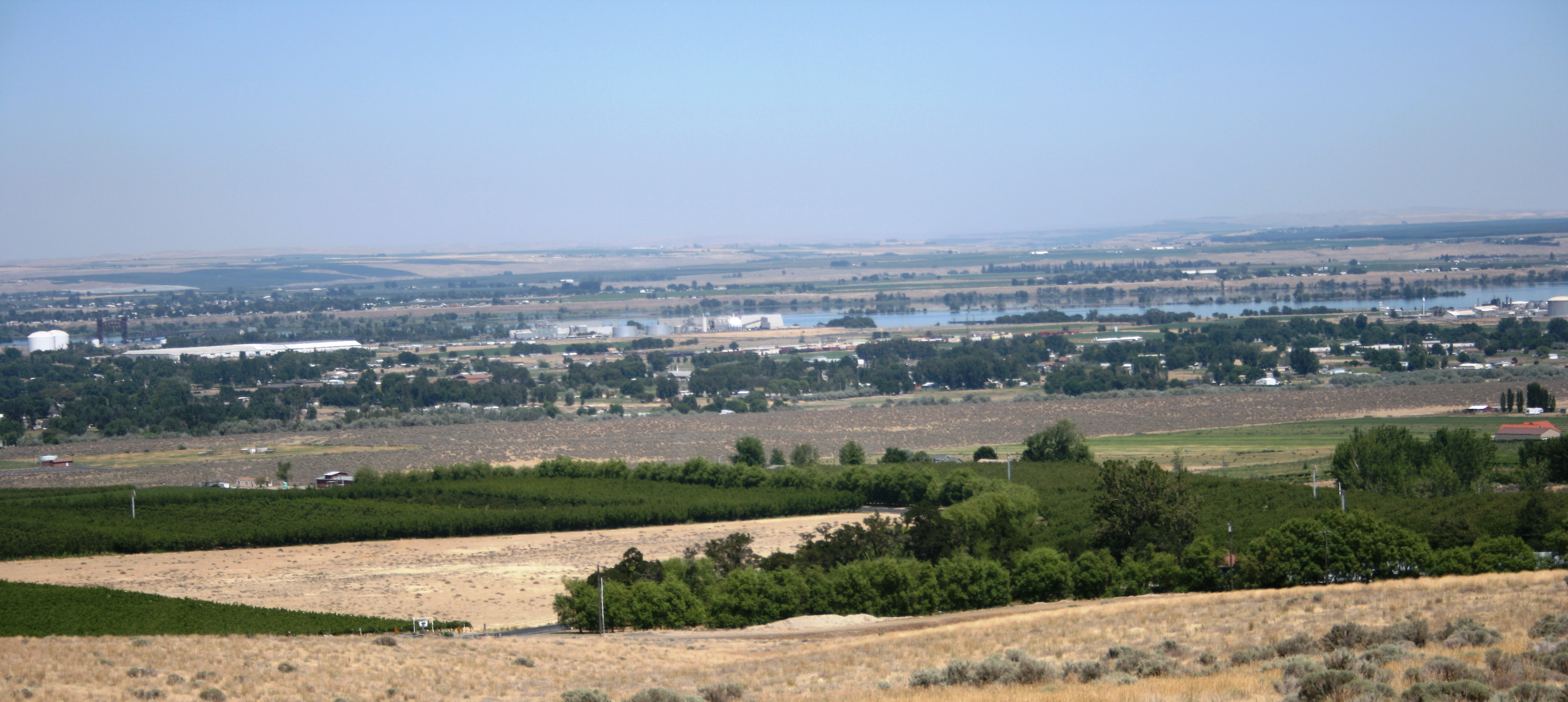
- Finley shown with industrial complexes along Columbia River and orchards in the foreground

- Location of Finley, Washington
- Coordinates: 46°09′32″N 119°01′26″W
- Country: United States
- State: Washington
- County: Benton

Area
  - Total: 14.6 sq mi (37.7 km^{2})
  - Land: 11.5 sq mi (29.8 km^{2})
  - Water: 3.1 sq mi (7.9 km^{2})
- Elevation: 341 ft (104 m)

Population (2020)
  - Total: 6,152
  - Density: 501/sq mi (193.5/km^{2})
- Time zone: UTC-8 (Pacific (PST))
  - Summer (DST): UTC-7 (PDT)
- ZIP code: 99337
- Area code: 509
- FIPS code: 53-23865
- GNIS feature ID: 2408211

Finley is a census-designated place (CDP) in Benton County, Washington, United States. The population was 6,152 at the 2020 census. It is located to the southeast of the larger city of Kennewick.

== History ==
A post office called Finley was established in 1906, and remained in operation until 1935. The community was named after George E. Finley, a pioneer settler. It includes the community of Hedges. Finley became a CDP in 2010. Prior to then, it was a part of the larger Pasco area.

== Geography ==
According to the United States Census Bureau, the CDP has a total area of 14.6 square miles (37.7 km^{2}), of which, 11.5 square miles (29.8 km^{2}) of it is land and 3.0 square miles (7.9 km^{2}) of it (20.88%) is water.

== Demographics ==
Historical population
Census	Pop.	Note	%±
1990	4,897		—
2000	5,770		17.8%
2010	6,012		4.2%
2020	6,152		2.3%
U.S. Decennial Census; 1970 1980 1990; 2000 2010

As of the census of 2000, there were 5,770 people, 1,987 households, and 1,585 families residing in the CDP. The population density was 501.2 people per square mile (193.6/km^{2}). There were 2,082 housing units at an average density of 180.8/sq mi (69.8/km^{2}). The racial makeup of the CDP was 91.40% White, 0.03% African American, 1.11% Native American, 0.24% Asian, 0.12% Pacific Islander, 4.71% from other races, and 2.37% from two or more races. Hispanic or Latino of any race were 8.99% of the population.

There were 1,987 households, out of which 39.1% had children under the age of 18 living with them, 62.7% were married couples living together, 10.5% had a female householder with no husband present, and 20.2% were non-families. 14.9% of all households were made up of individuals, and 4.3% had someone living alone who was 65 years of age or older. The average household size was 2.90 and the average family size was 3.19.

In the CDP, the age distribution of the population shows 29.5% under the age of 18, 8.4% from 18 to 24, 28.5% from 25 to 44, 24.8% from 45 to 64, and 8.8% who were 65 years of age or older. The median age was 36 years. For every 100 females, there were 101.7 males. For every 100 females age 18 and over, there were 101.8 males.

The median income for a household in the CDP was $42,820, and the median income for a family was $47,983. Males had a median income of $41,103 versus $23,818 for females. The per capita income for the CDP was $17,282. About 6.2% of families and 6.5% of the population were below the poverty line, including 9.1% of those under age 18 and 8.4% of those age 65 or over.
