= Pasco–Kennewick Bridge (1922) =

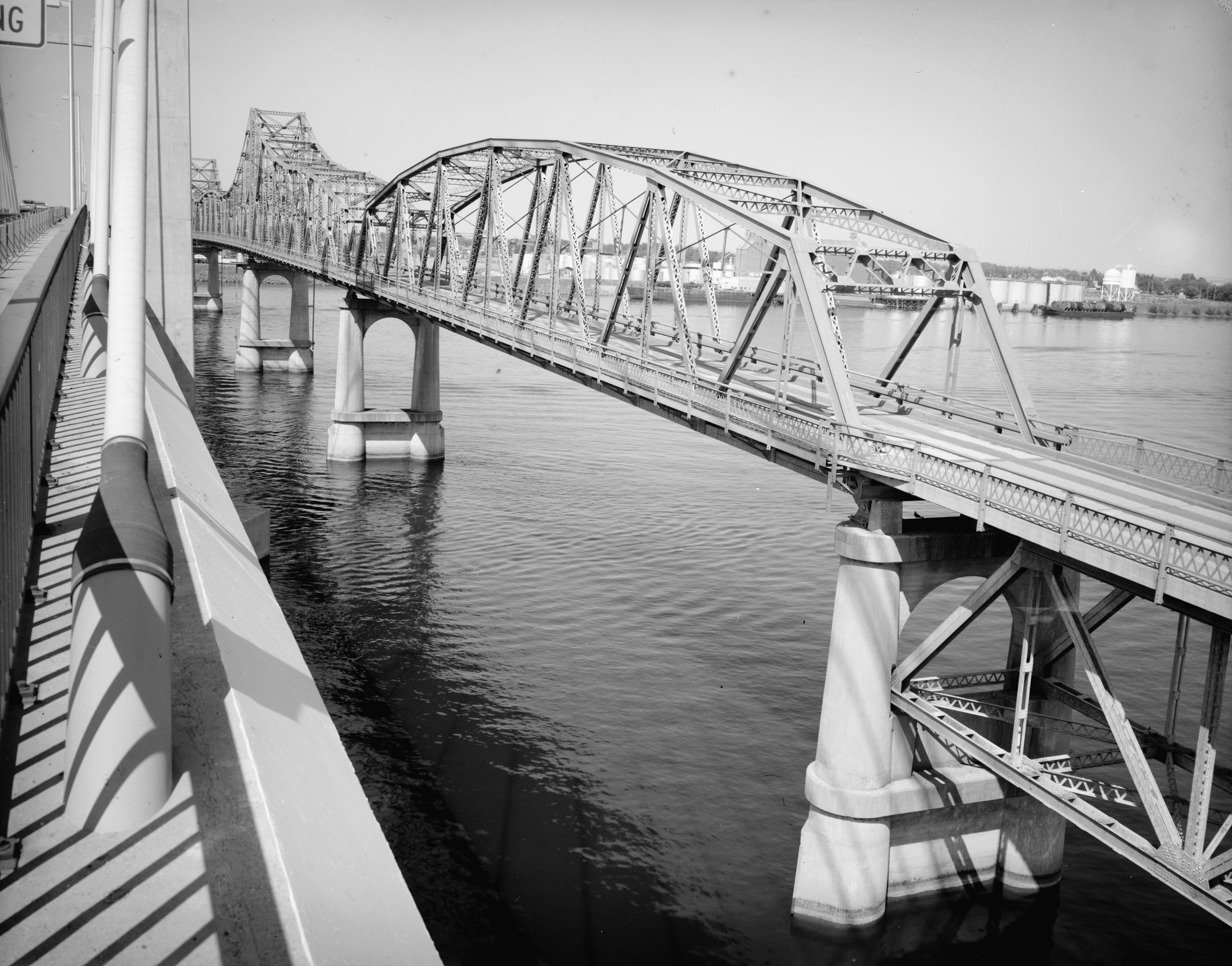
- As seen from the newer Cable Bridge
- Coordinates: 46°13′6.25″N 119°6′13.73″W
- Pasco–Kennewick Bridge
- Formerly listed on the U.S. National Register of Historic Places
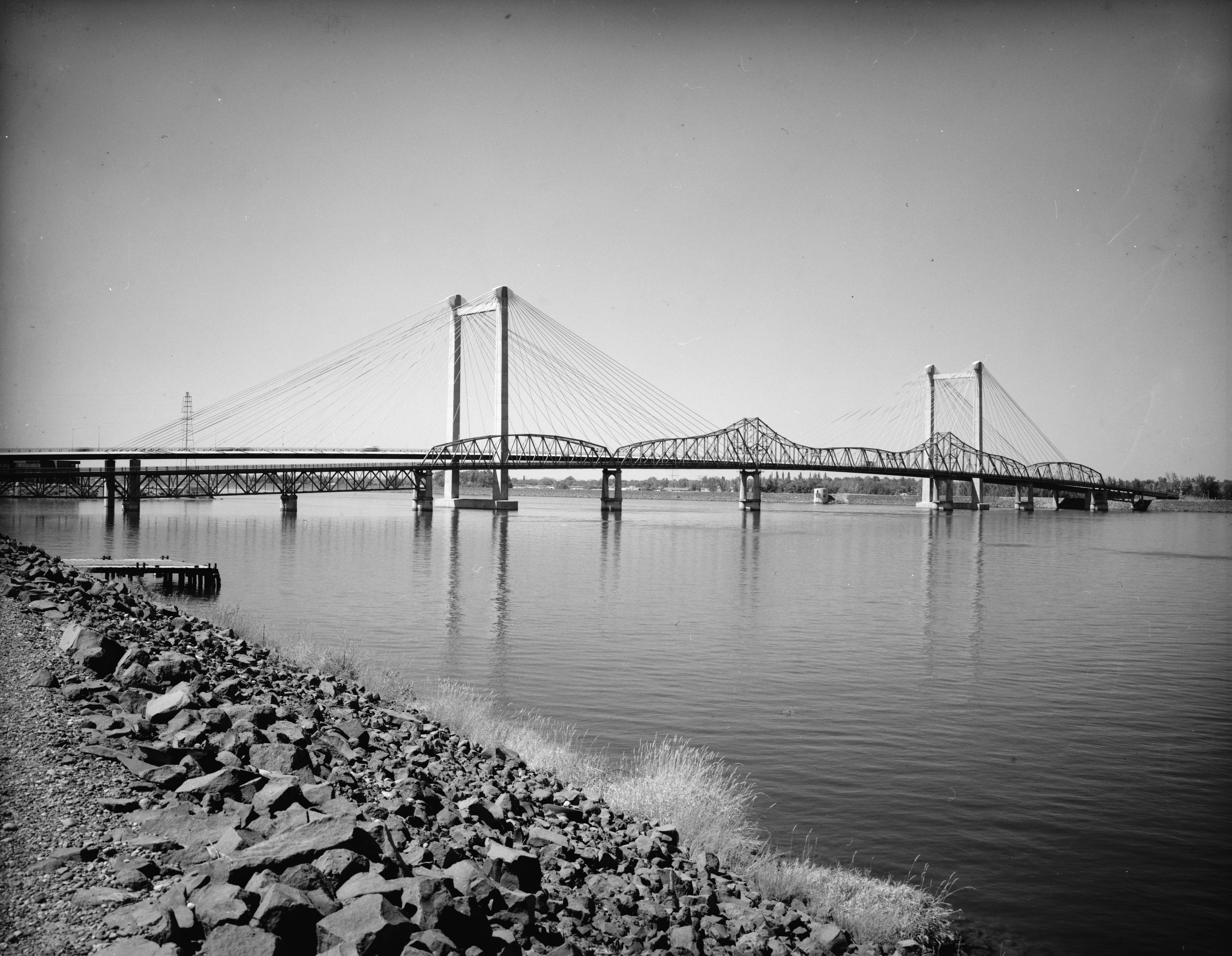
- Pasco–Kennewick Bridge with the Cable Bridge in the background

- Location within Washington (state)
- Location: Pasco, Washington
- Built: 1922
- Architect: Union Bridge Co.
- MPS: Historic Bridges/Tunnels in Washington State TR
- NRHP reference No.: 82004213

Significant dates
- Added to NRHP: July 16, 1982
- Removed from NRHP: July 16, 1990
- Crosses: Columbia River
- Locale: Pasco–Kennewick, Washington, U.S.

Characteristics
- Design: Cantilever truss bridge
- Material: Steel
- Total length: 3,300 ft (1,006 m)
- Height: 185 ft (56 m)
- Longest span: 432 ft (132 m)
- Clearance below: 54 ft (16 m)

History
- Designer: M. M. Caldwell
- Opened: October 7, 1922
- Inaugurated: October 21, 1922
- Closed: 1978
- Replaced by: Cable Bridge

Statistics
- Daily traffic: 18,000 cars/day
- Toll: none (after 1931)

Location
- Interactive map of Pasco–Kennewick Bridge

The Pasco–Kennewick Bridge or Benton–Franklin Inter-County Bridge, known locally as the Green Bridge, was a steel cantilever truss bridge in the northwest United States. It crossed the Columbia River in central Washington, connecting Pasco and Kennewick, two of the Tri-Cities. Succeeded by the Cable Bridge in 1978, it was demolished in 1990.

== Construction ==
The bridge was completed 104 years ago in 1922 after only a year of construction, replacing an outmoded ferry system in which a single trip transported a maximum of six cars across the Columbia River. It was in fact the first bridge for vehicular traffic across the middle part of the Columbia River (only ferries and rail bridges were previously available).

Originally planned in 1913 by B. B. Horrigan, funding was not secured until 1919, when Charles G. Huber of the Union Bridge Company sold $49,000 worth of company shares to finance the project, despite the country being in the grips of the Post-World War I recession. It was the first bridge of that size to be financed entirely with stock sales, and was a toll bridge for the first nine years; tolls were removed in 1931 once the initial construction costs ($480,000) had been repaid. It was also the first of three cantilever bridges built over the Columbia River in the 1920s.

The construction of the bridge was seen as a landmark in the development of the state's economy. The significance of the bridge is partly reflected in the beliefs and expectations of local and state residents who perceived the dedication as a history-making event, bringing together people from across the state; a gala affair that included speeches, car caravans, picnics, street dancing, and carnivals. As the Kennewick Courier-Reporter wrote, "The day the bridge was opened to traffic, a new era dawned for each community." The bridge was also an essential part of the old Inland Empire Highway system.

Not only did it transform the nickname "Twin Cities" into reality, but it was also a major crossing of the Columbia River, thereby making it an important part of the transcontinental Yellowstone Trail, and marked the first time that eastern and western halves of the state cooperated in the construction of something that was beneficial to both.

The state of Washington purchased the bridge in 1931 and added it to the state highway system in 1933. Benton and Franklin counties took ownership of the bridge in 1954, and then sold it to the cities of Pasco and Kennewick in 1968 for one dollar, which allowed the counties to begin planning the construction of the newer Cable Bridge.

== Use ==
Four years after its construction, the Green Bridge carried the newly formed US 410 between Kennewick and Pasco. In 1967, US 410 was decommissioned when US 12 was expanded from Lewiston to Aberdeen. The Green Bridge carried US 12 until its closure in 1978.

== Demolition ==
After the completion of the Cable Bridge, bridge preservationists led by Virginia Devine succeeded in placing the Pasco-Kennewick Bridge on the National Register of Historic Places. As a result, the Advisory Council on Historic Preservation came to an agreement with the Federal Highway Administration (FHWA) and the Washington state historic preservation office such that if the state wanted to demolish the bridge, it would then be subject to a popular vote.

In 1980, citizens of both Pasco and Kennewick voted in favor of its demolition, which then triggered a review by the FHWA to determine if any alternative uses could save the bridge from destruction. Preservationists submitted alternative plans to the FHWA, but the FHWA subsequently ruled that none of them were feasible or prudent. A lawsuit followed, with the United States District Court for the Eastern District of Washington ruling in favor of the FHWA. The case was then appealed to the United States Court of Appeals for the Ninth Circuit, whereupon the earlier ruling was overturned, with the order for the FHWA to conduct a more thorough review.

However, the FHWA still came to the same conclusion and the bridge was dismantled in March 1990, with most of the piers removed by the end of 1991. A proposal to keep the piers to support a new fishing pier was rejected by the Kennewick city council in 1991. One pier, as well as several wood and concrete footings portions several meters above the river bottom only visible while scuba diving, remains and serves as a scenic lookout from which the newer bridge may be seen.

== See also ==
- List of bridges documented by the Historic American Engineering Record in Washington (state)
