= Howard Amon Park =

City park in Washington, United States

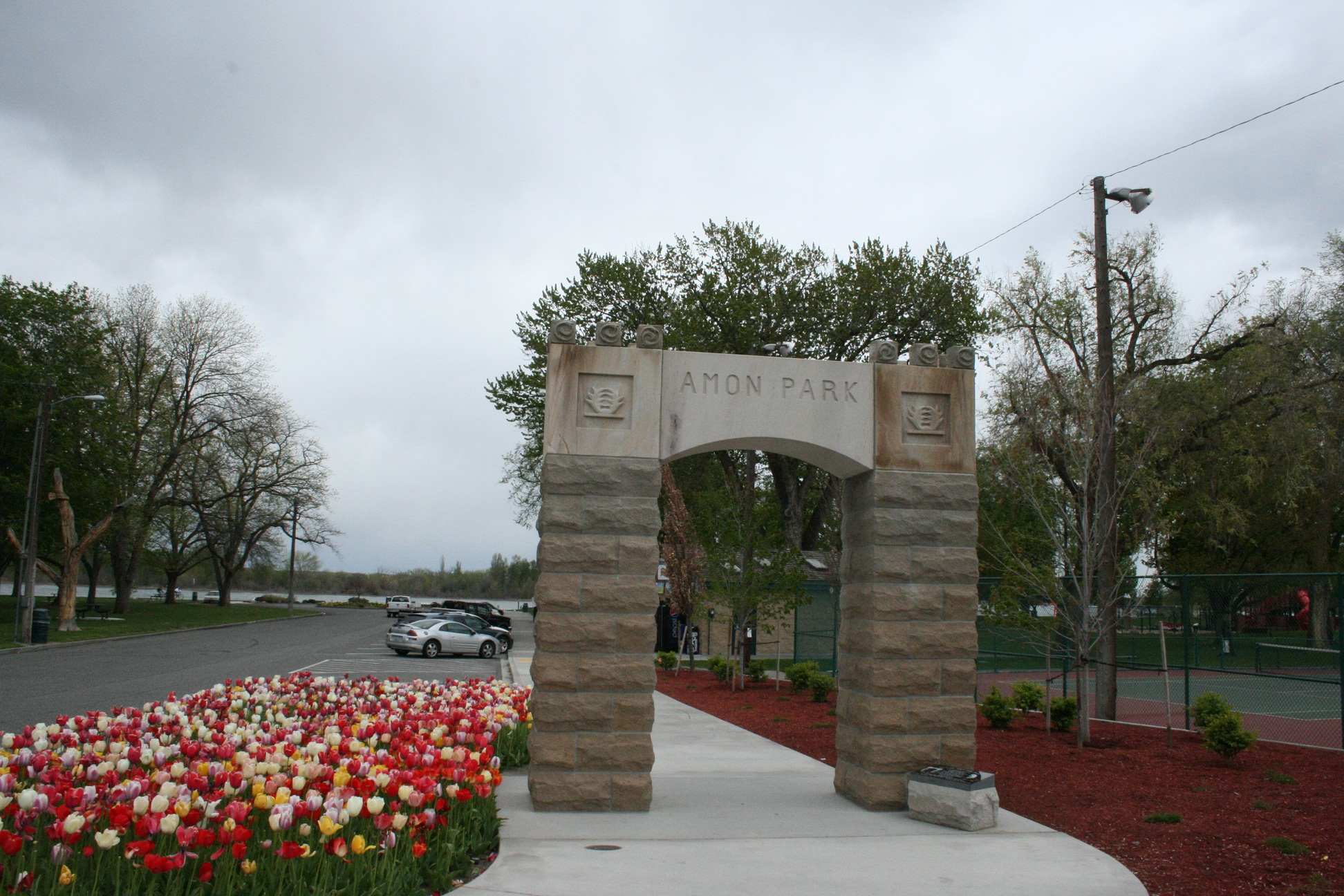
- The entrance to Howard Amon Park.

- Location within Washington (state)
- Location: Richland, Washington, United States
- Coordinates: 46°16′27″N 119°16′15″W
- Area: 45.9 acres (18.6 ha)
- Owner: City of Richland
- Status: Open all year

Howard Amon Park is a multi-use recreation area on the shore of the Columbia River in Richland in the U.S. state of Washington. The original arch at the entrance to the park was the first thing in the city when it was incorporated in 1912, but has since been replaced. The park is named after Howard Amon, one of Richland's early settlers.

It is at the east end of Lee Boulevard in the center of Richland on the river side of the levee and is accessible from several roads leading off of George Washington Way.

== Recreational features ==
Howard Amon Park has numerous recreational features, including river access, a playground and a facility for concerts. A paved bike path, the Riverfront Trail, runs the entire length of the park. The trail continues north of the park toward WSU Tri-Cities as well as south toward Columbia Point ending at the Sacagawea Heritage Trail. This connection with the Sacagawea Heritage Trail provides access to Kennewick and Pasco. The trail is popular, especially during the warmer months.

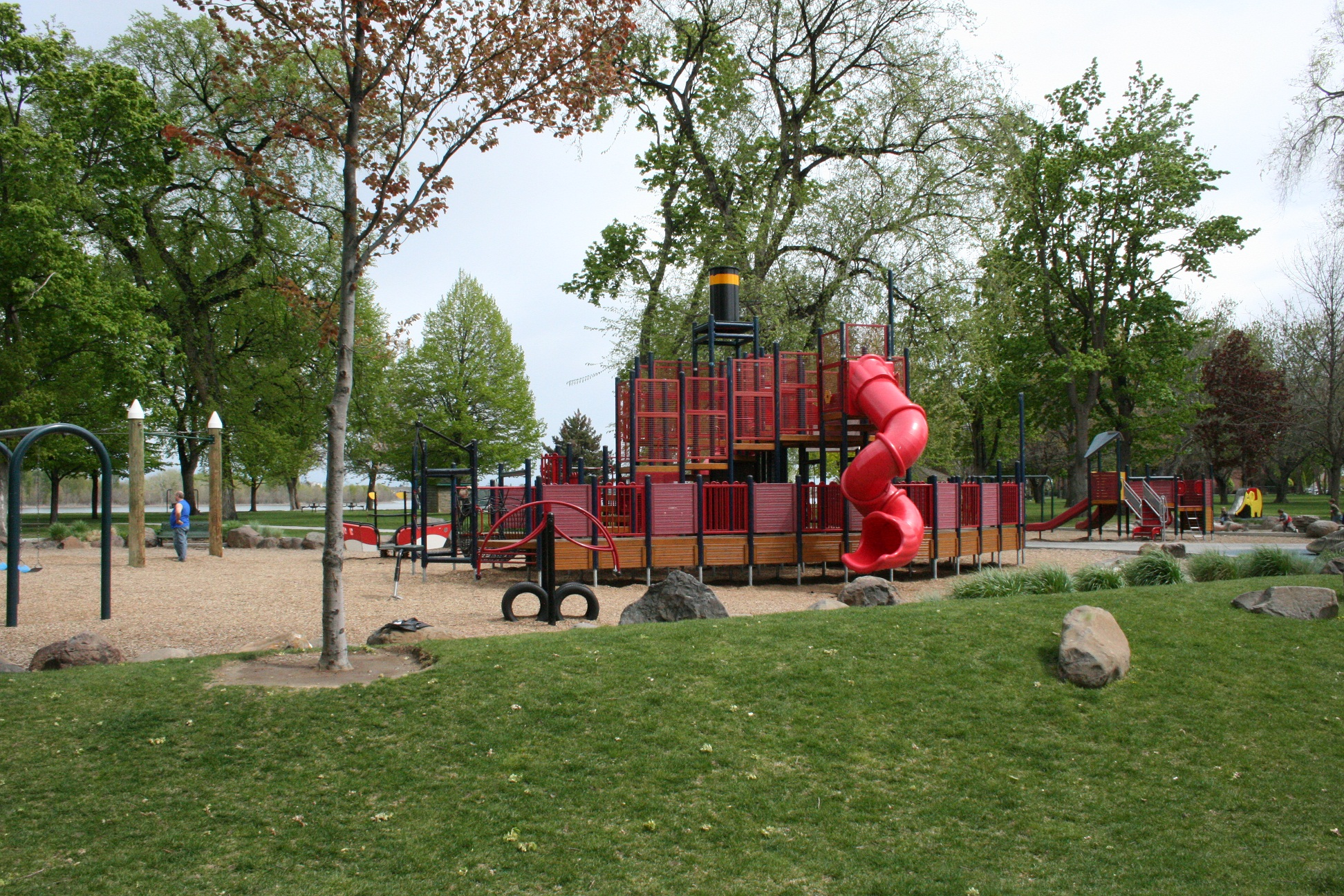
The majority of the playground equipment at Howard Amon Park

The playground in the park was built before 1970 and continues to be a popular destination for young families. An elephant slide within the playground is an iconic piece of Richland history. It was removed and put in storage in 2003 after it was deemed it no longer met safety requirements. After extensive discussion on social media in 2009, the slide was restored. It returned to the park in 2010. Other features at the playground include a short zip line and a rock climbing area.

Sports equipment at the park includes four tennis courts and a half basketball court. It is also a popular destination for water-related recreational activities. There is a small wading pool in the southern portion of the park. Beyond this, the park's riverfront location makes it an easy accesspoint to the Columbia. There are three docks, one at the end of Lee Boulevard, as well as two to the north. The northernmost dock is located alongside a boat launch, while the center one is for swimming.

== Events ==
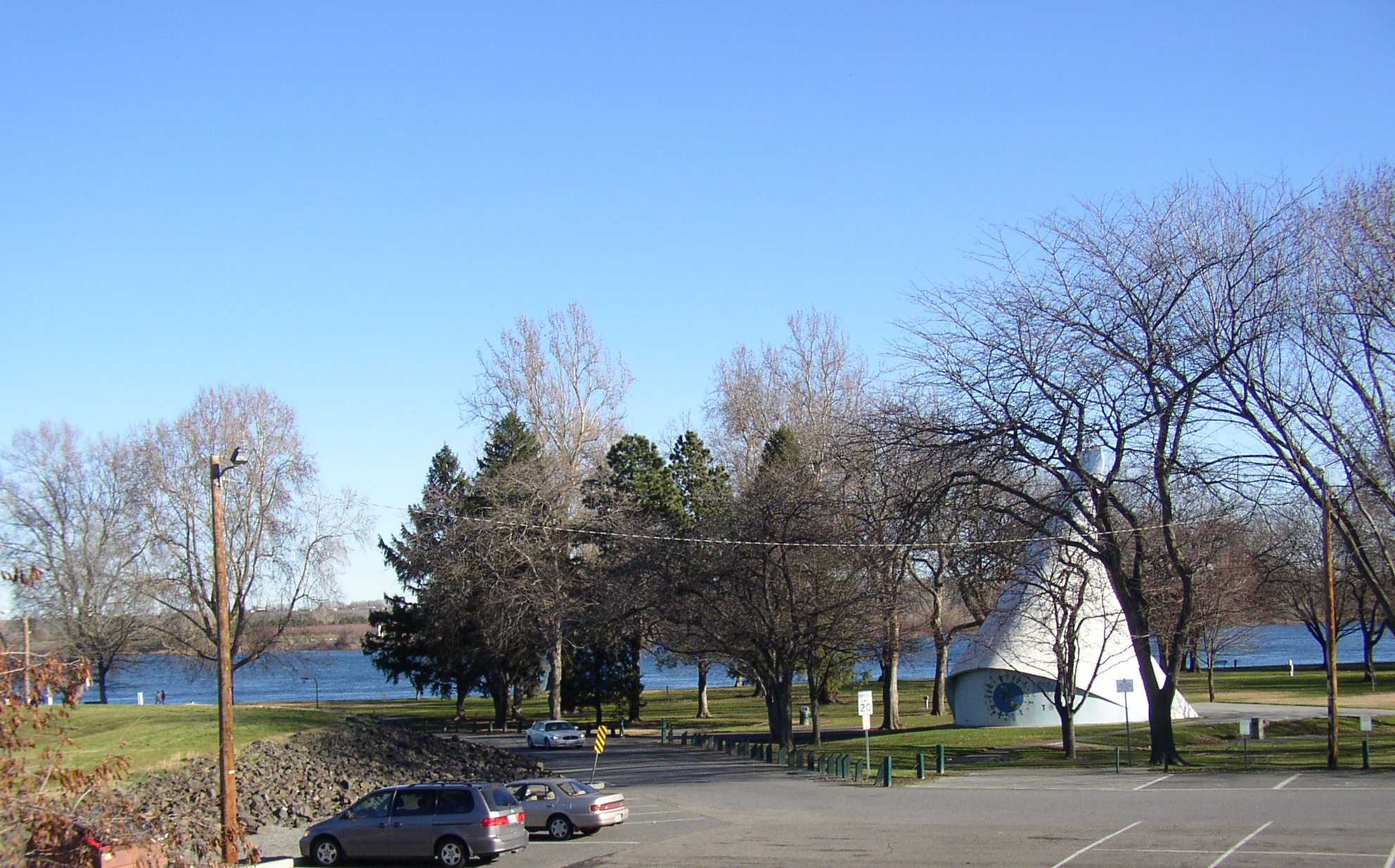
The backside of the Fingernail (right)

Beyond daily and seasonal recreational use, Howard Amon Park is a venue for several events throughout the year. Among the facilities for events is a bandshell, locally known as the Fingernail, which was in the park in 1982. The 60-ton structure was inspired by boats on Lake Washington adjacent to Seattle and was formerly an office building for a construction company where Interstate 182 currently runs. It was originally built in 1963.

The Allied Arts Association, which owns an art gallery adjacent to the park, hosts the Art in the Park festival the same weekend that the Columbia Cup hydroplane races are held in Columbia Park. The festival, which began in 1950, features art exhibits and music from artists from around the United States. In 2016, the festival hosted over 220 artists.

The Tumbleweed Music Festival, which began in 1997, is held every Labor Day weekend at Howard Amon Park. This mostly-free event features several music varieties, including bluegrass, Celtic and folk at five different stages. Renaissance fairs have also been hosted at the park, bringing in over 6,000 visitors.

A paddlewheel river cruise ship, American Empress, periodically docks at the Lee Boulevard dock at Howard Amon Park while en route from Vancouver to Clarkston.

== See also ==
- Bateman Island
- Columbia Park
- Sacajawea State Park
