= Sacagawea Heritage Trail =

Recreation trail in Washington, United States

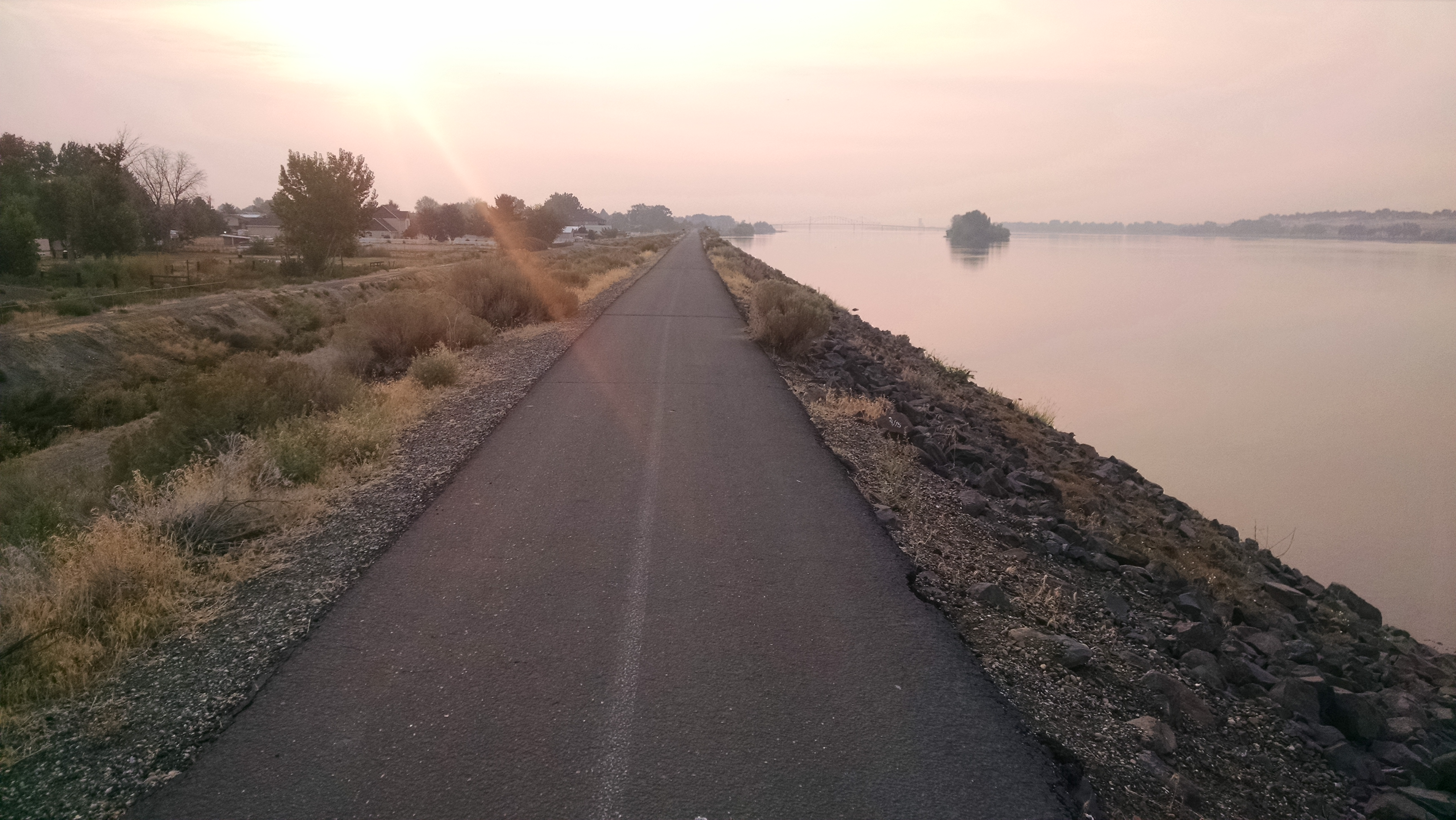
- The Sacagawea Heritage Trail, looking eastbound, in Pasco, Washington.
- Interactive map of Sacagawea Heritage Trail
- Length: 23 mi (37 km)
- Location: Tri-Cities, Washington
- Coordinates: 46.2263°N 119.1238°W
- From: Sacajawea State Park, Pasco
- To: Cable Bridge connecting Kennewick to Pasco

The Sacagawea Heritage Trail is a relatively flat 23 miles (37 km) multi-use recreational trail in the Tri-Cities, Washington. It travels along the Columbia River for its entire length, forming a loop that connects Pasco, Richland and Kennewick. The entire trail is paved. Mile markers count up from Sacajawea State Park at the confluence of the Columbia and Snake Rivers.

The trail is named after Sacagawea, a Lemhi Shoshone woman who accompanied the Lewis and Clark Expedition.

Portions of the trail are Class I (paved trail), Class II (center stripe) and Class III (signed route). There are mile markers along the entire length of the trail.

== Route description ==
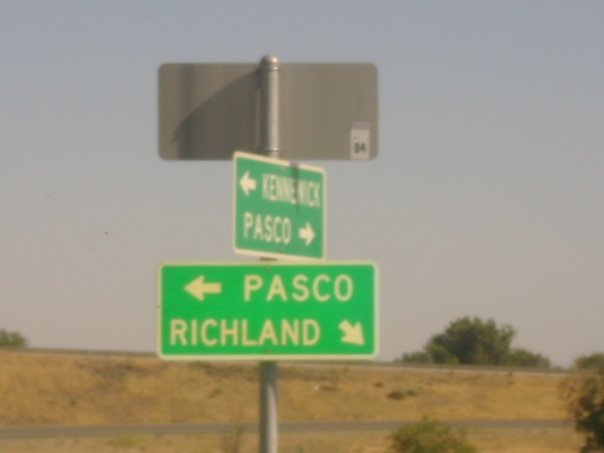
Signage on the trail where it crosses the Yakima River.

=== Pasco ===
Beginning at Sacajawea State Park, the trail heads westward through the industrial section of Pasco, going past the Port of Pasco and passing under the Cable and Blue Bridges. Beyond the Blue Bridge, the trail goes through Wade Park, where lanes are marked distinguishing between eastbound and westbound bicyclist lanes as well as a lane for walkers. These lane markings end when you exit the park and climb onto the Pasco Levee. At the west end of the levee travelers go through Chiawana Park before the trail goes onto Court Street with dedicated bike lanes in each direction for 1.1 miles (1.8 km) before crossing the Interstate 182 Bridge into Richland.

=== Richland ===
At the base of the bridge the trail has its junction with Riverfront Trail and continues westward until SR 240 where the trail turns south and parallels the highway until it nears the Columbia Park Trail Exit. During this time travelers cross the Yakima River Delta. When you approach Columbia Park Trail the trail turns east onto a levee until coming to a parking area. Following this first parking area, the trail passes by Bateman Island and enters Columbia Park at the Kennewick City Limit.

The Riverfront Trail leads north from Columbia Point, providing access to Howard Amon Park and WSU Tri-Cities.

=== Kennewick ===
The trail runs the entire length of Columbia Park with dedicated bike lanes on Columbia Park Trail. At the east end of the park the trail again passes under the Blue Bridge and again goes onto a levee and passes Clover Island before crossing the Cable Bridge and ending the loop. An alternate route takes riders across the Blue Bridge. There are bike lanes separated from the highway on both bridges. During the HAPO Gold Cup, a portion of the trail in Columbia Park is closed for the event.
