= Columbia Park (Tri-Cities) =

Public park in Washington, United States

- Columbia Park East & Columbia Park West
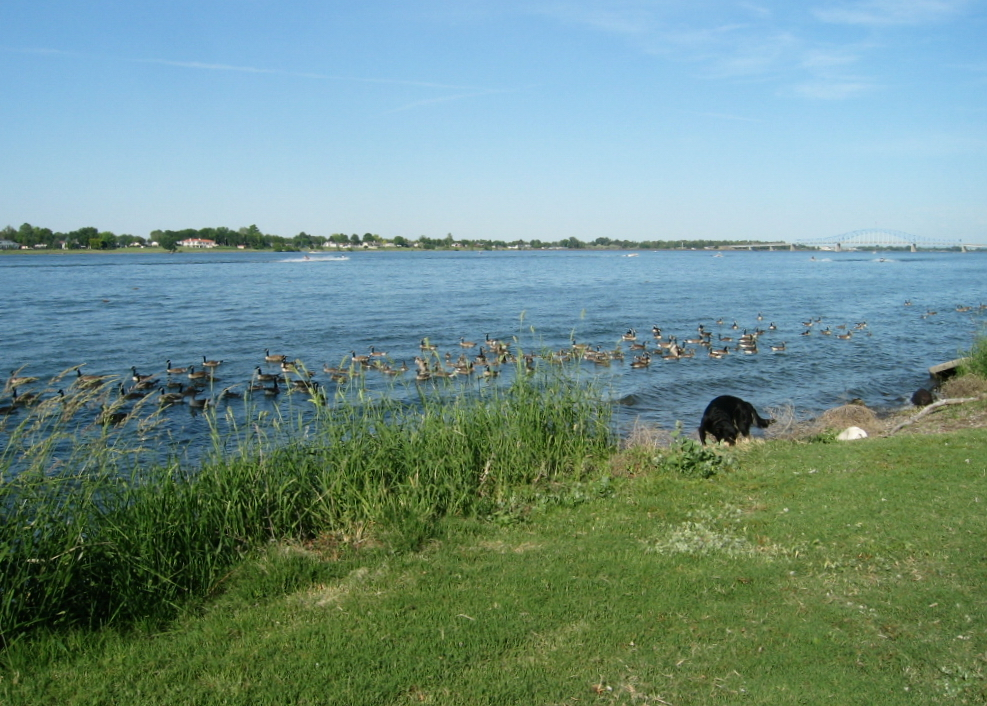
- The Columbia River along Columbia Park

- Location within Washington (state)
- Location: Benton County, Washington, United States
- Coordinates: 46°13′N 119°8′W
- Area: 450 acres (1.8 km^{2})
- Owner: U.S. Army Corps of Engineers
- Operator: City of Kennewick; City of Richland
- Status: Open all year

Columbia Park is a public park located in Benton County, Washington, United States. The park comprises the 400-acre (160 ha) Columbia Park East in Kennewick, and the adjacent 50-acre (20 ha) Columbia Park West in Richland. Together, the parks function as a single 450-acre (180 ha) park with 4.5 miles (7.2 km) of shoreline along the Columbia River. The park is a popular destination for residents of the Tri-Cities.

== Recreational features ==
Columbia Park has numerous recreational features, some of which include a privately run golf course, disc golf course and a family fishing pond.

There are several trails for hiking and bicycling in Columbia Park. Running the entire length of the park is the Sacagawea Heritage Trail, a bike trail that loops around the Tri-Cities providing bicyclists access to Pasco and Central Richland. The trail is popular, especially during times of warm weather.

There is a Veterans Memorial in the east end of the park. This memorial has the tallest freestanding granite structure in the United States, standing at 40 feet in height.

Geocaching in the park is a popular activity. In 2015 there were 19 geocaches in Columbia Park.

=== Playground of Dreams ===
In the east end of the park is the Playground of Dreams, which was built in 1999. Around half of the cost of the original playground was donated by Bechtel Hanford, KNDU-TV and Radio Tri-Cities. Around 6,000 volunteers helped in the construction of the playground

On November 29, 2003, arsonists burnt down the playground. Again the community raised the needed money to rebuild and volunteers from around the area offered a cumulative total of over 8,000 work hours. The playground was reopened on May 8, 2004. No one was arrested for the crime.

The Playground of Dreams has a wooden castle-like structure with artwork that looks like a spaceship, farm, house and pirate ship along with more local themes including the Blue Bridge and the Cable Bridge. There is also a swing set, monkey bars, climbing wall and an obstacle course.

Adjacent to the Playground of Dreams are a family fishing pond and an aquatic playground.

=== Boat Launches ===
There are a few boat launches in and near Columbia Park, offering boaters access to the Columbia River. All of the launches have parking lots that also serve as trailheads for the Sacagawea Heritage Trail.

Location	Parking Spaces	Surface	Dock	City	Notes
Bateman Island West	1 handicap, 4 trailer, 14 regular	1 paved, 1 gravel	Yes	Richland	
Columbia Park West	1 handicap trailer, 5 handicap, 35 trailer, 49 regular	3 paved	Yes	Richland	Home to a private marina.
Edison Street	1 handicap, 2 regular, 15 trailer	1 gravel	No	Kennewick	
East Launch	6 handicap trailer, 6 handicap, 53 regular, 112 trailer	4 paved	Yes	Kennewick	Near the foot of the Blue Bridge.

== Events ==
Since 1966 Columbia Park has hosted the a hydroplane race known as the Columbia Cup. During the Columbia Cup, portions of Columbia Park require a fee to enter and portions of the Sacagawea Heritage Trail are closed.

On Independence Day there is a large celebration in the park known as the River of Fire Celebration. There are multiple vendors and daylong activities, ending with fireworks being launched off of a barge floating offshore.

There are also several community events held throughout the year, and a polar bear plunge, which is held in the winter.

== History ==
During the Lewis and Clark Expedition, Meriwether Lewis and William Clark traveled along what later became Columbia Park when they explored up to Bateman Island in Richland. Bateman Island is as far upstream on the Columbia River that they explored.

Previous to building the McNary Dam near Umatilla, Oregon and SR-240, Columbia Park Trail was US Highway 410 and later US Highway 12. Most of the current route of Columbia Park Trail follows the old route of US 410 except in the east end of the park where the old road is now used as a portion of the Sacagawea Heritage Trail.

During the Columbia Cup in July 1996, two men wading through the river stumbled across a human skull. There was a police investigation where more human remains were found. It was determined that the remains belonged to a man who lived around 9,400 years ago. The remains have been named Kennewick Man.

== See also ==
- Bateman Island
- Howard Amon Park
- List of Washington state parks
- Sacajawea State Park
