= Silver Beach Amusement Park =

Coordinates: 42.1125°N 86.4875°W

Silver Beach County Park is a park located in St. Joseph, Michigan at the mouth of the St. Joseph River. It was formerly Silver Beach Amusement Park, an amusement park, which operated between 1891 and 1971.

== History ==
Silver Beach opened as a resort in 1891 when local businessmen in boat building Logan Drake and Louis D. Wallace built vacation cottages as Silver Beach Amusement and Realty Company along Lake Michigan. Construction of buildings such as a pavilion followed and were completed in 1896.

After the park was established, two of the earliest aviators, Augustus Moore Herring and Logan Archbold Vilas, used the beach to experiment with aircraft, the latter being the first person to fly across Lake Michigan when he flew from Silver Beach to Chicago.

The first roller coaster, Chase through the Clouds, opened in 1905; it was replaced in 1923 by another coaster, the Velvet (later "the Comet"). Also added in 1905 were a roller rink, with a pipe organ included in 1906, both firsts in the region, and a boxing ring, with matches organized by boxer Tommy Ryan. A dance hall opened in 1907, replaced by the Shadowland Ballroom in 1927; performers would include the founders of MCA Inc., founded after Drake encouraged two performers to create the endeavor. In the ensuing decades, the park expanded, including the additions of a ferris wheel, miniature train, children's amusement ride area, and miniature golf course, and maintained continued popularity due in part to the owners providing steamboat access from Chicago. In what has become an icon of Silver Beach, a carousel had been added by 1916, taking advantage of the enlarged area of beach sand created by Lake Michigan in the years during the park's operation.

Silver Beach's success continued until the 1960s, when crime and unrest became much more common, and closed on August 10, 1970, due to the escalating problems including a violent incident on July 4, 1969. The park attempted to recover but did not reopen after the 1971 season. Rides and attractions were sold and the amusement park was abandoned; the remaining structures were demolished starting in 1975. LECO Corporation bought the property on November 22, 1977; Berrien County bought it from LECO on December 14, 1990, and now operates it as Silver Beach County Park.

From 1979 to 2011, Silver Beach hosted the Venetian Festival.

== Silver Beach Carousel ==
In 1997, the Silver Beach Carousel Society was founded with the goal of returning the original carousel to its location at Silver Beach, but they were unable to secure funding before the carousel was sold to a group of businessmen in Washington State who placed it in the Southridge Sports and Events Complex in Kennewick.

The society was determined to build a new carousel near Silver Beach County Park and, in 2010, the new Silver Beach Carousel opened its doors. The new carousel is accompanied by exhibits from the Silver Beach Amusement Park, a Kid's Discovery Zone hosted by St. Joseph's Curious Kids Museum, the Whirlpool Compass Fountain and the Shadowland Ballroom, which hosts wedding receptions and other special occasions.
