= Clover Island Light =

Lighthouse in Washington, United States

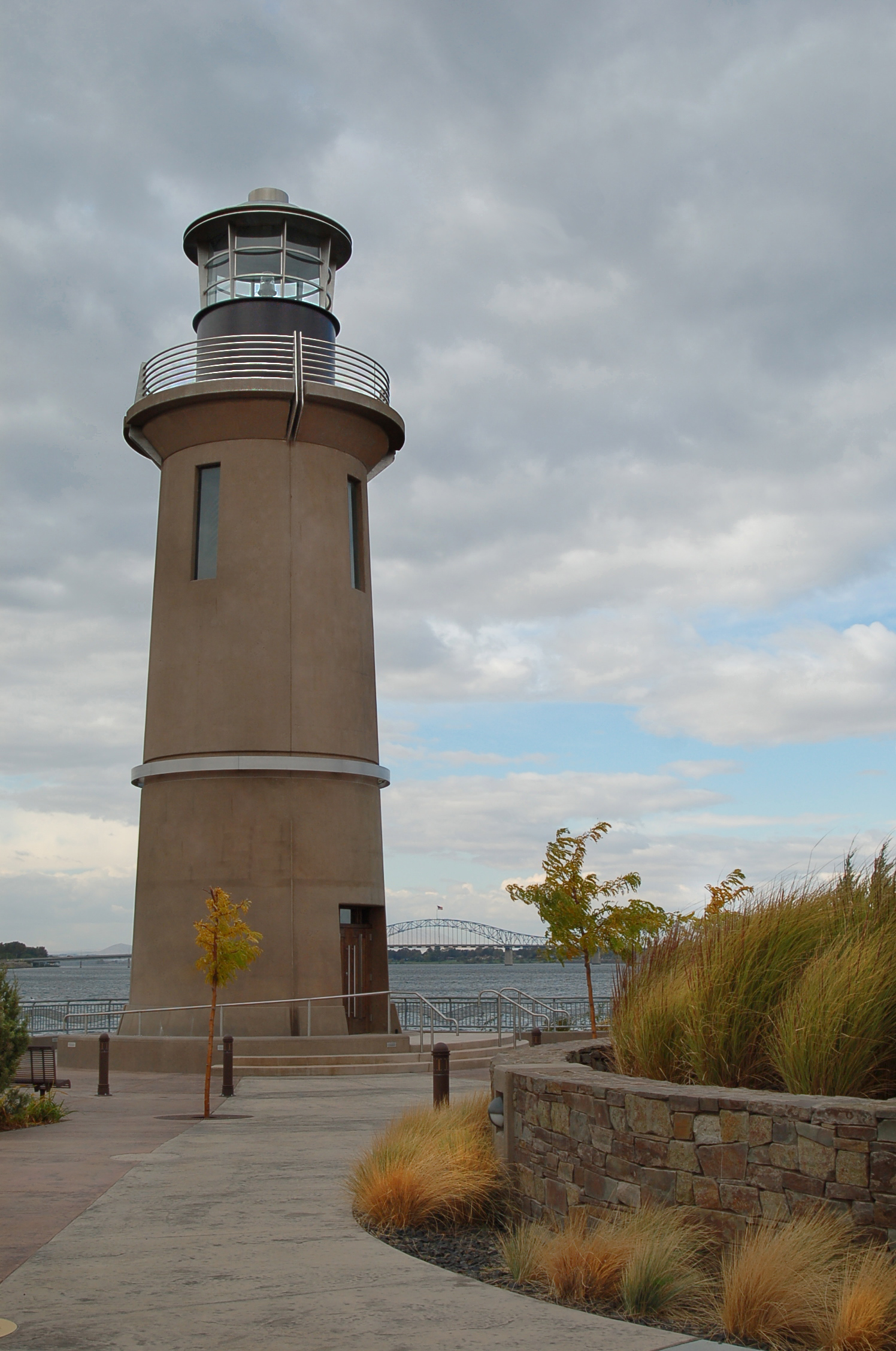
- Location: Kennewick, United States
- Coordinates: 46°13′01″N 119°06′40″W

Tower
- Constructed: 2010
- Construction: concrete, steel
- Height: 62 ft (19 m)
- Power source: solar power

Light
- Focal height: 69 ft (21 m)
- Characteristic: Fl W 4s

The Clover Island Light is a 62 feet (19 m) tall lighthouse along the Columbia River on Clover Island in Kennewick, Washington. Completed in 2010, it is the first lighthouse to be built in the United States since 1962.

The structure is constructed from concrete and steel, and features a solar-powered beacon, which flashes every four seconds.
