= Clover Island =

Small island in Washington, United States

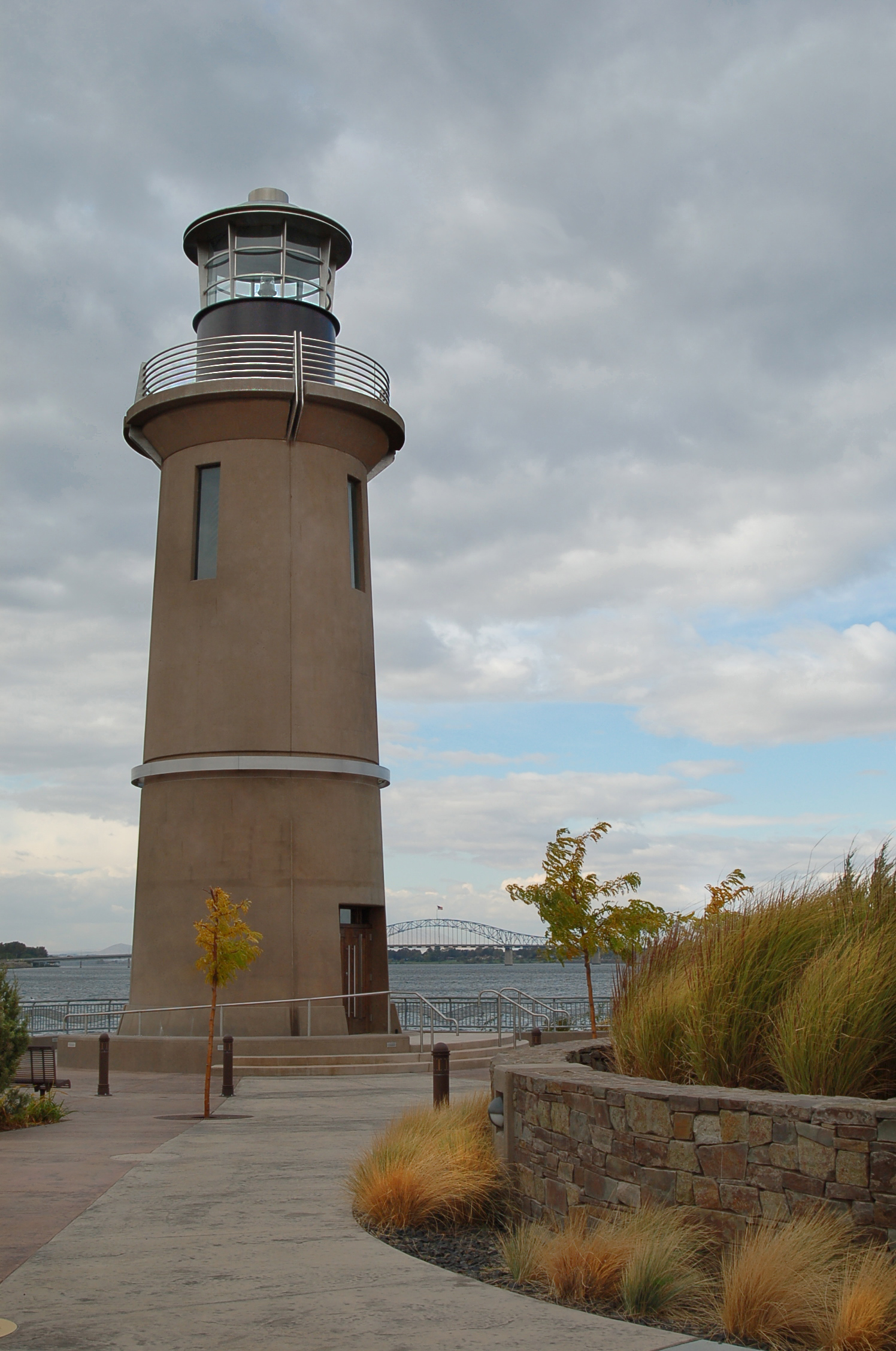
- The lighthouse on Clover Island with the Blue Bridge in the background.

- Location within Washington (state) Location within the United States

Geography
- Location: Columbia River, Kennewick, Washington
- Coordinates: 46.217°N 119.111°W
- Area: 0.025 sq mi (0.065 km^{2})
- Length: 0.43 mi (0.69 km)
- Width: 0.07 mi (0.11 km)

Administration
- United States
- State: Washington
- County: Benton County
- City: Kennewick

Demographics
- Population: 0

Clover Island is a small island in the Columbia River located between the Blue Bridge and the Cable Bridge in Kennewick, Washington. It is roughly 2,400 feet (730 m) long, 700 feet (210 m) wide and has an area of 16 acres (6.5 ha). The island is owned by the Port of Kennewick. Prior to the construction of the McNary Dam near Umatilla, Oregon, Clover Island had an area of around 162 acres (66 ha).

Members of the Lewis and Clark Expedition visited Clover Island on October 17, 1805, while en route to the Pacific Ocean.

== Amenities ==
Unlike Bateman Island, which is located upstream in nearby Richland, Clover Island is highly developed. It is connected to the shore by a causeway which is crossed by Clover Island Drive. Clover Island is also easily accessible by bicyclists, owing to its proximity to the Sacagawea Heritage Trail.

Clover Island is home to the Clover Island Inn, a four-story hotel at the east end of the island. Also on the island is the Ice Harbor Brewing Company, and three eating establishments.

The Clover Island Yacht Club is located on the island, as well as a two lane boat launch and a 62 feet (19 m) tall lighthouse. The Clover Island Light is the first lighthouse to be built in the United States since 1962.

=== Future development ===
The Port of Kennewick has extensive plans to further develop Clover Island. Future plans include constructing buildings to house a post office as well as retail space and mixed use developments. There are also plans to create a few new viewpoints at various locations on the island to provide scenic views of the Columbia River and the bridges crossing it. A tour boat dock is also planned. Several of the projects, like the Village at Island Harbor, are in various forms of construction.

Changes to improve fish habitats around the island are also planned, with the Port working with the Army Corps of Engineers. That project is expected to cost less than $5 million, with 75% of the funding going to environmental restoration and 10% of the budget going to recreational development.

== Coast Guard Station ==
The United States Coast Guard's Aids to Navigation Team (ANT) Kennewick is headquartered on the island. ANT Kennewick is part of Marine Safety Unit Portland and holds primary responsibility for fixed navigational structures in the Columbia River between Hood River, Oregon and Richland as well as in the Snake River from its mouth upstream to Lewiston, Idaho. They also hold secondary responsibility for all other navigational aids between Hood River and Fort Peck, Montana, which includes major lakes near Spokane and in the Idaho Panhandle.

ANT Kennewick was established in 1992. Previous to this it was known as Station Kennewick. The facility was built in 1962 when operations were moved from John Day, Oregon because Kennewick seemed like a more reasonable halfway point.
