= Logan Archbold Vilas =

- Born: May 25, 1891; Chicago, Illinois
- Died: May 15, 1976 (aged 84); Bonita Springs, Florida
- Other names: Jack Vilas
- Parent(s): Royal Cooper Vilas; Carrie Logan Ward

Logan Archbold "Jack" Vilas (May 25, 1891 – May 15, 1976) was an aviation pioneer and a member of the Early Birds of Aviation. He was inducted into the Wisconsin Aviation Hall of Fame in 2000.

== Biography ==
He was born in New York City on May 25, 1891, to Royal Cooper Vilas and Carrie Logan Ward. They moved to Evanston, IL when Jack was about 5 years old.

In the spring of 1913, Vilas visited Glenn Curtiss in Hammondsport, New York, and made a down payment on his Hydro-Aeroplane and enrolled in the Curtiss Flying School. He graduated in four weeks becoming a certificated pilot, holding U.S. Hydro-License No. 6 from the Aero Club of America. He became the first person to fly across Lake Michigan when he completed a 64 mile over-the-water flight from Silver Beach Amusement Park in St. Joseph, Michigan, to Chicago on July 1, 1913. In 1914, he flew to Milwaukee, Wisconsin, with the Wisconsin Aero Club and, in the summer of 1915, he was hired by the Wisconsin Conservation Commission to fly fire patrol over the Northwoods in his Curtiss Model F flying boat. On June 29, 1915, at Trout Lake, Wisconsin, Vilas made what is believed to be the world’s first forest patrol flight.

In 1929, he began writing a book “for the purpose of giving to my children some of the happenings in my early life…” The book is “My Life To My Children” by Jack Vilas. Published in 1934.

He died on May 15, 1976, in Bonita Springs, Florida.
