= Southridge Sports and Events Complex =

- Location within Washington (state)
- Location: Kennewick, Washington, United States
- Coordinates: 46.181350°N 119.184199°W
- Area: 52 acres (0.21 km^{2})
- Opened: March 2012
- Operator: City of Kennewick
- Status: Open all year

The Southridge Sports and Events Complex is a 52-acre (21 ha) development on the south side of Kennewick in the U.S. State of Washington. It is adjacent to U.S. Route 395 between 27th and Hildebrand Boulevard and is near Southridge High School.

The complex has several sports and recreational amenities, as well as a memorial to the victims of the September 11 attacks. The facilities on the complex opened in stages, beginning with the baseball fields in 2011, progressing to the carousel in 2014. The grand opening was in 2012.

== History ==
Planning and construction of the complex took about ten years, with 42 acres being originally allotted for the complex and another ten set aside for later development. In 2009, Kennewick's city council applied to a grant from the State of Washington for $12.5 million to help build infrastructure in the Southridge area to help foster economic growth. The baseball diamonds were complete by July 2011.

The first official dedication at the complex was the 9/11 Memorial on the southeast corner of the property, which took place on September 11, 2011 – the 10th anniversary of the attacks in New York City, Washington, D.C., and Pennsylvania. The event included a home run derby and other sports-related activities. The grand opening of the complex occurred the following March, drawing a crowd of about 200 people.

Shortly before the grand opening, the city council approved the placement of a historic carousel that was originally built in 1910 and placed in the Silver Beach Amusement Park in St. Joseph, Michigan. After spending over six decades in Michigan, the amusement park it resided in closed. It was dismantled and relocated to Roswell, New Mexico. Gesa Credit Union bought the naming rights to the carousel, and it was opened in 2014 after Kennewick invested $830,000 into its restoration.

== Facilities ==
Located on the site are numerous indoor and outdoor sports facilities that can be rented. Outside, there are four baseball diamonds and multi-use fields. The 30,000 square feet (2,800 m^{2}) sports pavilion is the only one of its kind in the region and features full size courts for basketball and volleyball. The pavilion can also be rented for non-sporting events. Beyond the sports facilities, the complex has a splash pad, and a concession stand.

The Gesa Carousel of Dreams is a restored 1910 carousel located on the site. It has 45 horses, all of which were carved by Charles Carmel. Carmel emigrated from Russia in 1883 and worked for many carousel manufacturers. The building also serves as an events center that can host up to 100 individuals.

The 9/11 Memorial is a 35-foot (11 m) tall piece of the wreckage from the World Trade Center weighing 6,000 pounds (2,700 kg) that was obtained from the Port Authority of New York and New Jersey in 2011. The memorial sits on a 40-foot (12 m) square base that has two basalt pillars that symbolize the original Twin Towers.
