= Ice Harbor Brewing Company =

Brewery in Kennewick, Washington, U.S.

- Industry: Alcoholic beverage
- Founded: 1996
- Headquarters: Kennewick, Washington
- Products: Beer
- Production output: 1300 bbs

Ice Harbor Brewing Company is a brewery founded in Pasco, Washington in 1996 by two former workers at the Hanford Site. They entered this venture after buying the Meheen & Collins brewery.

The brewery (prior to 2024) was located in what was once a grain mill at 206 N. Benton St. in Kennewick, Washington. This building served as a brewery, and as a brewpub. The menu offered sandwiches and various fare as well as the brewery's creations. The brewpub had recently installed a beer engine, which allows the beer to be pulled from the cask, rather than pushed by carbon dioxide gas. The brewpub was believed to be the only Tri-City brewpub that used such a device.

Ice Harbor Brewing opened its second pub, which is still currently located at the Port of Kennewick's commercial building at 350 Clover Island Dr. on Clover Island in Kennewick, in late October 2007. The Marimna features much of the same brews and fare at the Railroad Avenue brewpub, but without the homebrewing inventory.

The brewery has now since moved to 10 E Bruneau in Kennewick, WA, and no longer offers homebrewing inventory.

== The Brewery ==
The brewery is located at 10 E Bruneau Ave in Kennewick, WA and offers meal and beer. Seltzers brewed on site are also available on tap.

- Guest Ciders are showcased each week; with some familiar names are Schilling Cider, 2 Towns, and Tieton Cider Works. Non-alcoholic beer options, normally from Deschutes, are on rotation and readily available.

== The Marina ==
The marina (located at 350 Clover Island Drive in Kennewick, WA) is a waterfront retreat. It is the newest location. With a more extensive menu [than the Brewery], a full-service bar, and the same beers as in the brewery/pub.

- Guest Ciders are showcased each week; with some familiar names are Schilling Cider, 2 Towns, and Tieton Cider Works. Non-alcoholic beer options, normally from Deschutes, are on rotation and readily available.

== Mug Membership (Details) ==
- 20oz Etched IHB Mug to take home
- 20oz. Mug for same price as a pint
- 10% off IHB Merchandise
- Discounted Mugs on your birthday
- Membership Card (laminated)
- Mug Member of the Day rotation for a chance to receive discounted mugs all day

== Brewery VS Marina ==
- Mug Membership is available at the brewery location while $100 at the Marina.

== The Beers (Current Selection) ==
Ice Harbor Brewing provides a variety of handcrafted ales and lagers, all of which have names that reflect the local area. Beers below listed in order of common availability with specialty beers located last. All descriptions pulled from Ice Harbor Brewery main website.

=== India Pale Ale (IPA) ===
STATS: OG 1.064 | ABV 6.8% | IBUs 60

Balanced between "hops" and "HOPS!" this is a deep golden, medium bodied ale. Lots of late addition kettle hops along with heavy dry hopping give this beer a fruity flavor and aroma, and a medium malt backbone.

Hops: Millennium, Magnum, Cascade, Chinook, Simcoe, Citra, Amarillo, Galaxy

Awards

- 2006 Silver Medal - North American Beer Awards for American-Style IPA
- 2013 Bronze Medal - Washington Beer Awards for American-Style IPA

=== Columbia Kölsch ===
STATS: OG 1.048 | ABV 5.0% | IBUs 20

Modeled after the Kölsch beers of Germany, this smooth, soft-bodied golden ale is lightly fruity with a dry finish. A hybrid lager/ale yeast and extended cold conditioning contributes to the overall flavor profile. It has a lower alcohol content.

Hops: Mt Hood, Crystal

Awards

- 2007 Gold Medal - North American Beer Awards for German-Style Kölsch
- 2009 Bronze Medal - North American Beer Awards for German-Style Kölsch

=== The Tangerine Hefeweizen ===
STATS: OG 1.048 | ABV 5.0% | IBUs 12 A golden unfiltered wheat beer with a taste of tangerine.

Hops: Mt. Hood

Awards

- 2005 Bronze Medal - North American Beer Awards for Fruit Beer
- 2011 Gold Medal - North American Beer Awards for Fruit Beer
- 2012 Bronze Medal - North American Beer Awards for Fruit Beer
- 2013 Silver Medal - Washington Beer Awards for Fruit Beer
- 2016 Bronze Medal Washington Beer Awards for Fruit Beer
- 2024 Gold Medal Washington Beer Awards for Fruit Beer

=== Runaway Red Ale ===
STATS: OG 1.054 | ABV 5.5% | IBUs 27

Hops: Magnum, Cascade, and Galaxy

Awards

- 2013 Bronze Medal - Washington Beer Awards for American-Style Amber Ale
- 2018 Bronze Medal - North American Beer Awards for American-Style Amber Ale

=== Harvest Pale Ale ===
STATS: OG 1.054 | ABV 5.6% | IBUs 35

A medium bodied, deep golden ale with a distinctive aroma and refreshing flavor, with Cascade and Centennial hops.

Hops: Magnum, Cascade, Centennial, Citra

Awards

- 2007 Bronze Medal - North American Beer Awards for American-Style Pale Ale

=== Sternwheeler Stout ===
STATS: OG 1.059 | ABV 5.9% | IBUs 30

This dark, almost black, beer gets its mocha taste from roasted barley, chocolate and black patent malts combined with Northwest two-row barley.

Hops: Magnum, Cascade

Awards

- 2009 Silver Medal - North American Beer Awards for American-Style Stout
- 2013 Gold Medal - North American Beer Awards for Export-Style Stout
- 2013 Bronze Medal - Washington Beer Awards for Export-Style Stout

=== Hefeweizen ===
STATS: OG 1.048 | ABV 4.8% | IBUs 16

A golden unfiltered wheat beer with a hint of clove and banana.

Hops: Mt. Hood

=== Hop Warrior ===
STATS: OG 1.075 | ABV 8.3% | IBUs 85

A medium bodied Imperial IPA with strong hop bitterness, citrus flavors and aromas. Dry hopping with Cascade, Chinook, Warrior, Summit, and Zythos gives the beer citrus flavors of orange and lemon.

Hops: Millennium, Magnum, Cascade, Chinook, Columbus, Centennial, Citra

== History ==
- The brewery was previously located at located at 206 N. Benton St., #C in Kennewick and had their last day of service on February 25, 2022.
  - In addition to being a brewery and a brewpub, Ice Harbor also sells homebrewing equipment and supplies. They also provide monthly classes for beginning homebrewers as well as the meeting place for the local homebrew club the Mid-Columbia Zymurgy Association.
  - Used a 10-barrel (bbl) system and uses a single-stage infusion mash system. The brewery is capable of producing an annual yield of 1300 bbls, both for sale outside the brewery and in the brewpub.
