= Venetian Festival =

Annual festival

Venetian Festival is the name of a festival held in cities in Europe and North America. They are based on carnival, or carnevale, the period just before Lent, as celebrated in the 17th century in Venice, Italy. Venetian festivals re-create the fantasy of the earlier events with food, costumes, masks, music, theater, juggling and other spectacles. The masks and costumes are worn by people who often travel from other countries to attend and perform (or parade) in these festivals. The elaborate costumes and masks are handmade by artisans from various countries. Many involve male and female or group versions and are based on old Venetian characters and costumes.

In the U.S., A Venetian Festival is held in Charlevoix, Michigan which started in 1930. There is also a Venetian Festival held in Saugatuck, Michigan.

Another Venetian Festival, in Lake Geneva, Wisconsin, has been run by the Lake Geneva Jaycees since 1962.

A Venetian Festival was formerly held annually on the third weekend of July at Silver Beach County Park in St. Joseph, Michigan, a small town on the coast of Lake Michigan in the southwest part of the state. It started in 1979, and grew from a handful of people to nearly 200,000 visitors at the end. Once a two-day event on Friday and Saturday, this festival eventually ran from Thursday through Sunday and featured a variety of amusements. It was discontinued after the 2011 festival.

In the UK Venetian Festival is used ro describe parades of boats, usually light up at night. These festivals date from the 19th century. Examples are in Hythe, Kent, and Matlock Bath, Derbyshire.
