= McNary Levee System =

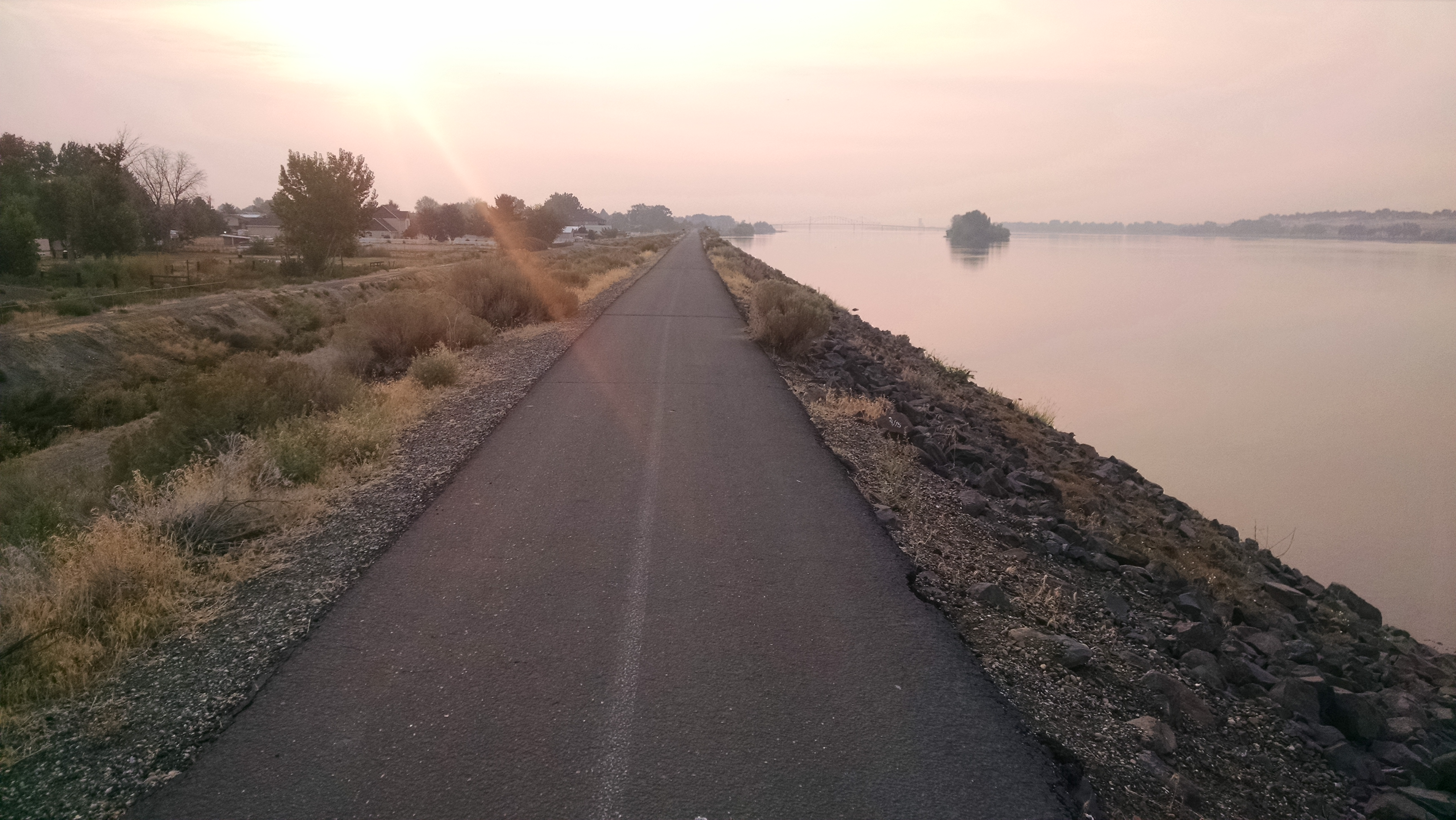
Levee with the Sacagawea Heritage Trail running along the crest

The McNary Levee System, also known as the Tri-Cities Levees, is an appurtenant or dam-related structure to McNary Lock and Dam and consists of three groups of levee segments along the banks of the Columbia River, providing flood risk reduction for parts of Kennewick, Pasco, and Richland, Washington.

== Overview ==
The levee group is named based on locations and identified as the Kennewick Levees, Pasco Levees, and Richland Levees. Lake Wallula, located behind the McNary Lock and Dam, stretches approximately 63 miles long and includes 242 miles (389 km) of shoreline and a drainage area of 214,000 square miles (550,000 km^{2}). The McNary Levee System comprises about 16.8 miles (27.0 km) of earthen levees and includes 11 operational pump plants designed to remove agricultural runoff, groundwater migration, and rainfall runoff. Construction of the McNary Levee System began in 1950 and was completed in 1954.
