= Kennewick, Washington =

City in the United States

- City
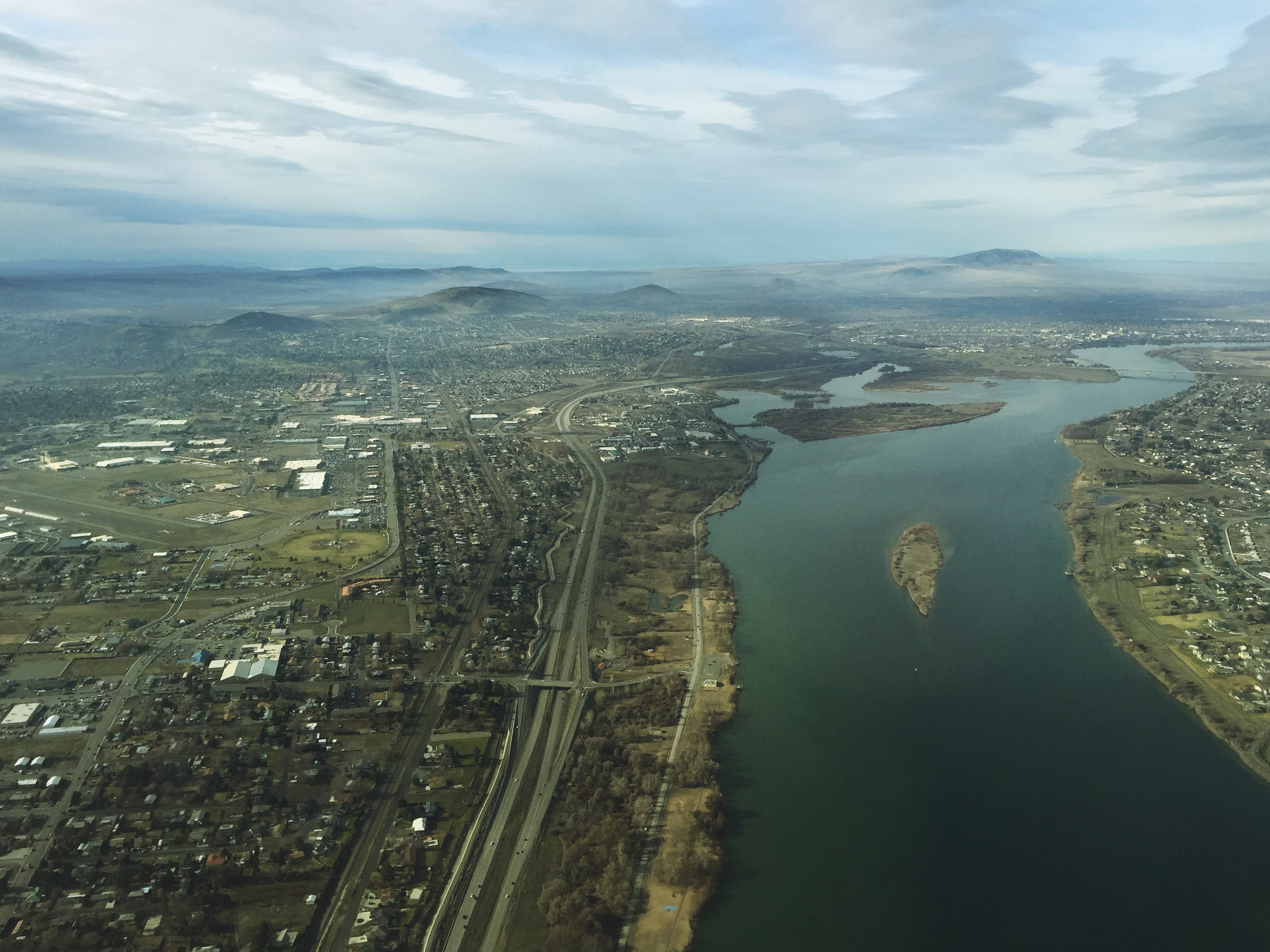
- Aerial view of Kennewick from above the Columbia River near the Blue Bridge
- Interactive location map of Kennewick
- Coordinates: 46.197622°N 119.175923°W
- Country: United States
- State: Washington
- County: Benton
- Incorporated: February 5, 1904

Government
  - Type: Council–manager
  - Mayor: Jason McShane
  - City manager: Erin Erdman

Area
  - City: 29.962 sq mi (77.601 km^{2})
  - Land: 28.570 sq mi (73.996 km^{2})
  - Water: 1.392 sq mi (3.606 km^{2}) 4.65%
- Elevation: 560 ft (170 m)

Population (2020)
  - City: 83,921
  - Estimate (2024): 86,728
  - Rank: US: 415th WA: 14th
  - Density: 2,937.4/sq mi (1,134.1/km^{2})
  - Urban: 255,401 (US: 157th)
  - Urban density: 2,276/sq mi (878.8/km^{2})
  - Metro: 319,428 (US: 165th)
  - Combined: 381,496 (US: 105th)
- Time zone: UTC−8 (Pacific (PST))
  - Summer (DST): UTC−7 (PDT)
- ZIP Codes: 99336, 99337, 99338
- Area code: 509
- FIPS code: 53-35275
- GNIS feature ID: 2410184
- Website: go2kennewick.com

Kennewick (/ˈkɛnəwɪk/) is a city in Benton County, Washington, United States. It is located along the southwest bank of the Columbia River, just southeast of the confluence of the Columbia and Yakima rivers and across from the confluence of the Columbia and Snake rivers. It is the most populous of the three cities collectively referred to as the Tri-Cities (the others being Pasco and Richland). The population was 83,921 at the 2020 census, and was estimated at 86,728 in 2024.

The discovery of Kennewick Man along the banks of the Columbia River provides evidence of Native Americans' settlement of the area for at least 9,000 years. American settlers began moving into the region in the late 19th century as transportation infrastructure was built to connect Kennewick to other settlements along the Columbia River. The construction of the Hanford Site at Richland accelerated the city's growth in the 1940s as workers from around the country came to participate in the Manhattan Project. While Hanford and Pacific Northwest National Laboratory continue to be major sources of employment, the city's economy has diversified over time and Kennewick today hosts offices for Amazon and Lamb Weston.

== History ==
=== Native peoples ===
Native Americans populated the area around modern-day Kennewick for millennia before being discovered and settled by European descendants. These inhabitants consisted of people from the Umatilla, Wanapum, Nez Perce, and Yakama tribes. Kennewick's low elevation helped to moderate winter temperatures. On top of this, the riverside location made salmon and other river fish easily accessible. By the 19th century, people lived in and between two major camps in the area. These were located near present-day Sacajawea State Park in Pasco and Columbia Point in Richland. Lewis and Clark noted that there were many people living in the area when they passed through in 1805 and 1806. The map produced following their journey marks two significant villages in the area - Wollawollah and Selloatpallah. These had approximate populations of 2,600 and 3,000 respectively.

There are conflicting stories on how Kennewick gained its name, but these narratives attribute it to the Native Americans living in the area. Some reports claim that the name comes from a native word meaning "grassy place". It has also been called "winter paradise", mostly because of the mild winters in the area. In the past, Kennewick has also been known by other names. The area was known as Tehe from 1886 to 1891, and this name appears on early letters sent to the area with the city listed as Tehe, Washington. Other reports claim that the city's name is derived from how locals pronounced the name Chenoythe, who was a member of the Hudson's Bay Company.

=== Settlement and early 20th century ===
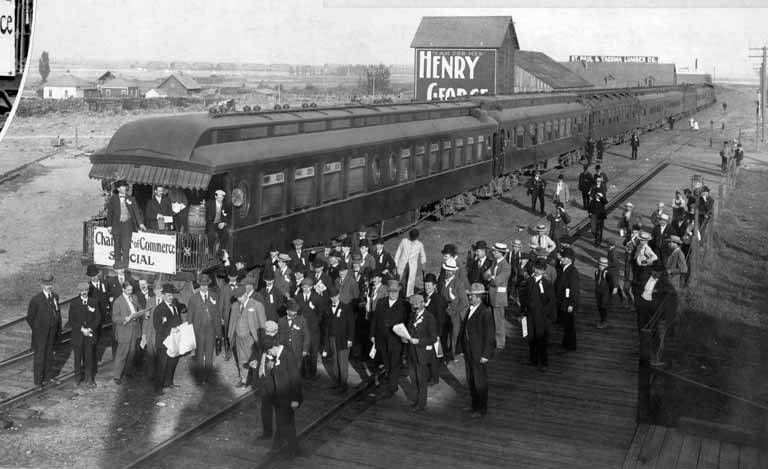
Businessmen from the Seattle Chamber of Commerce visiting Kennewick in 1908.

The Umatilla and Yakama tribes ceded the land Kennewick sits on at the Walla Walla Council in 1855. Ranchers began working with cattle and horses in the area as early as the 1860s, but in general settlement was slow due to the arid climate. Ainsworth became the first non-Native settlement in the area—where U.S. Route 12 now crosses the Snake River between Pasco and Burbank. Some Ainsworth residents would commute to what is now Kennewick via small boats for work. All that remains of Ainsworth is a marker placed by the Washington State Department of Transportation near the site.

During the 1880s, steamboats and railroads connected what would become known as Kennewick to the other settlements along the Columbia River. Until the construction of a railroad bridge, rail freight from Minneapolis to Tacoma had to cross the Columbia River via ferry. In 1887, a temporary railroad bridge was constructed by the Northern Pacific Railroad connecting Kennewick and Pasco. That bridge could not endure the winter ice on the Columbia and was partially swept away in the first winter. A new, more permanent bridge was built in its place in 1888. It was around this time that a town plan was first laid out, centered around the needs of the railroad. A school was constructed using donated funds, but this burned soon after it was finished. This initial boom only lasted briefly, as most of the people who came to Kennewick left after the bridge was finished.

In the 1890s, the Northern Pacific Irrigation Company installed pumps and ditches to bring water for agriculture into the Kennewick Highlands. Once there was a reliable water source, orchards and vineyards were planted all over the Kennewick area. Strawberries were another successful crop. The turn of the century saw the creation of the city's first newspaper, the Columbia Courier. Kennewick was officially incorporated on February 5, 1904. and the name of the newspaper changed to the Kennewick Courier in 1905 to reflect this change. In the following decade, an unsuccessful bid attempted to move the seat of Benton County from Prosser to Kennewick. There have been other unsuccessful attempts to make this move throughout the city's history, most recently in 2010.

In 1915, the opening of the Celilo Canal connected Kennewick to the Pacific Ocean via the Columbia River. City residents hoped to capitalize on this new infrastructure by forming the Port of Kennewick, making the city an inland seaport. Freight and passenger ship traffic began that same year. The port also developed rail facilities in the area. Transportation in the region further improved with the construction of the Pasco-Kennewick Bridge in 1922, which is locally known as the Green Bridge. This bridge connected the two cities by vehicle traffic for the first time. Kennewick and Pasco both experienced decent growth and became informally known as the Twin Cities throughout the Columbia Basin because of their juxtaposition across the river from each other.

Like many other agricultural communities, the Great Depression had an impact in Kennewick. Despite lowered prices for crops grown in the region, the city continued to experience growth, gaining another 400 people during the 1930s. Growth was aided by federal projects that improved the Columbia River. Downstream, Bonneville Dam at Cascade Locks, Oregon allowed larger barges to reach Kennewick. Grand Coulee Dam, located upstream of Kennewick, fostered irrigation across the Columbia Basin north of Pasco, sending more raw material through Kennewick.

=== Post-war development ===
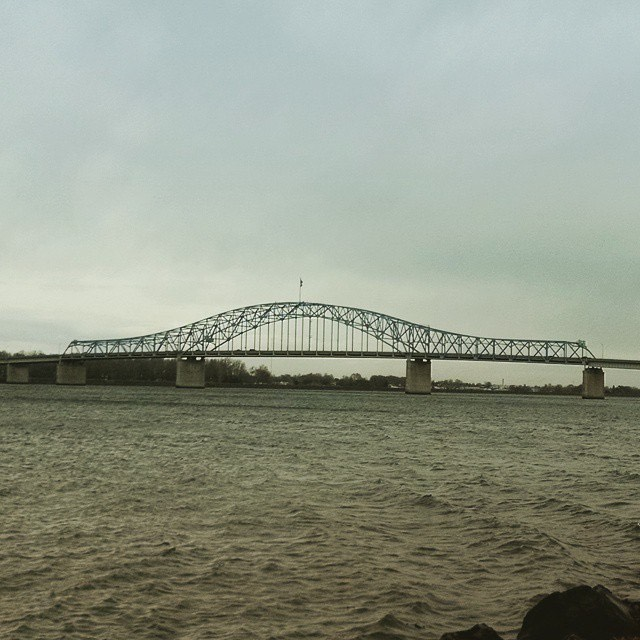
The Blue Bridge as seen from Columbia Park

Kennewick and the greater Tri-Cities area experienced significant changes during World War II. In 1943, the United States opened the Hanford nuclear site in and north of Richland. Its purpose originally was to help produce nuclear weaponry, which the US was trying to develop. People came from across the United States to work at Hanford, who were unaware of what they were actually producing. They were only told that their work would help the war effort. The federal government constructed housing in Richland, but many employees of that site then commuted from Kennewick. The plutonium refined at the Hanford Site was used in the Fat Man bomb, which was dropped in Nagasaki in 1945. As the Hanford Site's purpose has evolved, there has continually been a tremendous influence from the site on the workforce and economy of Kennewick. Due to activity at the Hanford Site, the 1950 census recorded major population growth in the Tri-Cities, with Richland overtaking to become the largest city in the region. From 1940 to 1950, the population of Richland grew from 247 residents to 21,793 residents, while Pasco gained from 3,913 to 10,114, and Kennewick increased from 1,918 to 10,085.

An effort to build a new bridge began in 1949 and was funded in 1951 because of increasing traffic between Kennewick and Pasco, largely due to commuters heading to and from the Hanford Site in Richland and McNary Dam, which was under construction near Umatilla, Oregon. The two-lane Green Bridge was the only one for automobiles across the Columbia River in the Tri-Cities at the time, and the 10,000 cars crossing it daily had created traffic problems. A new four-lane divided highway bridge, dubbed the Blue Bridge, opened in 1954 less than 2 miles (3.2 km) upstream from the Green Bridge. The Cable Bridge opened between Kennewick and Pasco in 1978 and was built to replace the Green Bridge. However, demolishing the Green Bridge proved to be controversial. Those seeking to preserve the bridge for historical reasons were able to stall the demolition, but it was eventually torn down in 1990.

=== 20th century racial discrimination ===
Racial discrimination against African Americans was common in Kennewick before the civil rights movement. The city was a sundown town, requiring African Americans to be out of the city after nightfall. The only place they could live in the Tri-Cities at one time was east Pasco. Even during the day, African Americans would experience harassment by the general public and police, with some police officers stopping every person of color they found in the city after dark. In the 1940s, covenants restricted African Americans from owning property in the city. After the U.S. Supreme Court ruled in Shelley v. Kraemer that racially restrictive covenants could not be enforced in state courts, these were replaced by informal agreements between homeowners and realtors to refuse to sell to African Americans.

Kennewick's racial discrimination problems became a contributing factor behind a community college not being built there in the 1950s. In 1963, regional NAACP leaders started pressuring the state government to investigate exclusionary practices and staged demonstrations in front of city hall. Initial meetings led the state to determine that while no official policy banning African Americans from the city existed, racial discrimination was a significant barrier to that community living and feeling safe. Despite this, the Washington State Board Against Discrimination indicted Kennewick for its sundown town status.

=== 1980 to present ===
The 1980 eruption of Mount St. Helens caused volcanic ash to fall on Kennewick. Higher accumulations were recorded in surrounding communities, such as Ritzville, and the ash plume was thick enough to trigger street lamps to turn on at noon. Cars that didn't have external filters stopped functioning during the eruption. Kennewick and surrounding areas have been dusted by smaller eruptions of Mount St. Helens since.

The area was connected to the Interstate Highway System in 1986 when construction on Interstate 82 (I-82) between Benton City and the south end of Kennewick was completed. This came after over a decade of fighting between Washington and Oregon regarding the planned route of the freeway. With backing from Tri-Cities and Walla Walla area businesses, Washington had pushed for a route that connected those cities. Oregon eventually opposing proposed routes that didn't cross the Umatilla Bridge, a compromise was reached placing I-82 on its current alignment to the south and southwest of Kennewick while authorizing the construction of Interstate 182 as a spur heading directly into Richland and Pasco.

The 1980s also brought the two most serious attempts to merge Kennewick with the other cities in the Tri-Cities, both of which failed. This resulted from an economic down turn in the area caused by the cancellation of two proposed nuclear power plants on the Hanford Site. The first proposal was to consolidate all three cities (Kennewick, Pasco, and Richland) into one, while the second only included Kennewick and Richland. Support for both of these attempts was strong in Richland, but voters in Kennewick and Pasco were not on board.

The Toyota Center was used as a venue for ice hockey and figure skating during the 1990 Goodwill Games. This international sporting competition was similar to the Olympic Games, but significantly smaller in scale. Most of the events were held in the host city, Seattle, but were also staged in other areas of the state, including Tacoma and Spokane.

In 1996, an ancient human skeleton was found on a bank of the Columbia River. Known as Kennewick Man, the remains are notable for their age (some 9,300 years). Ownership of the bones has been a matter of controversy with Native American tribes in the Inland Northwest claiming the bones to be from an ancestor of theirs and wanting them to be reburied. After a court litigation, a group of researchers were allowed to study the remains and perform various tests and analyses. They published their results in a book in 2014. A 2015 genetic analysis confirmed the ancient skeleton's ancestry to the Native Americans of the area (some observers contended that the remains were of European origin). The genetic analysis has notably contributed to knowledge about the peopling of the Americas.

Kennewick fared better than most of the state during the Great Recession, primarily due to consistent job growth in the metro area during that time. This was largely driven by the Hanford Site, which only had one significant period of layoffs which briefly caused economic uncertainty. Home sales experienced a small decline from 2007 to 2009, but rebounded in 2010. Since the recession, Kennewick has expanded greatly. While growth has been experienced throughout the city, new development has been strongest in the Southridge area along U.S. Route 395 (US 395) and in the west part of the city thanks to their access to major roads and the ample land available in those areas when development started.

== Geography ==
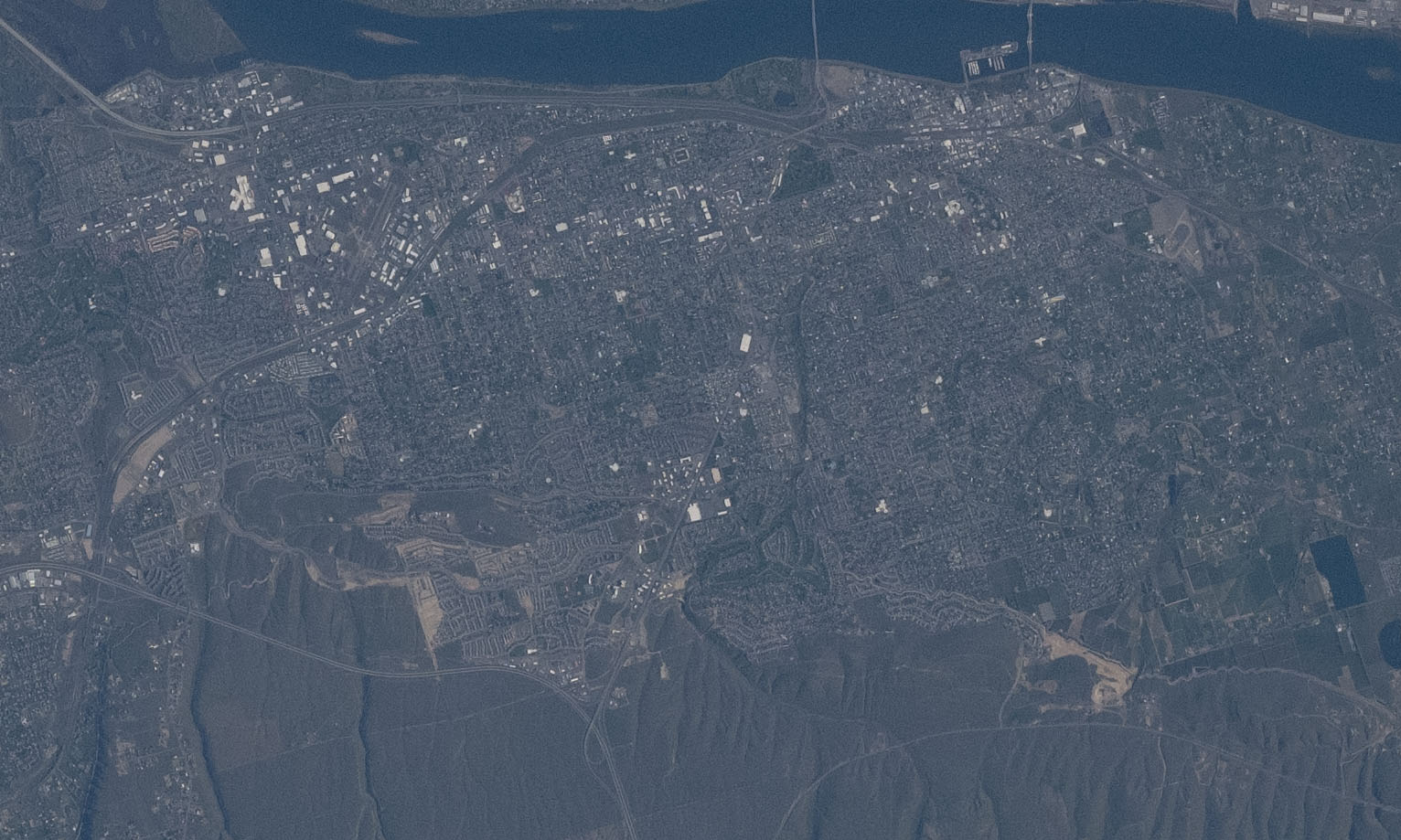
View from ISS Expedition 73, April 2025

Kennewick is located in Eastern Washington along the south side of the Columbia River and is one of three cities in the Tri-Cities. The other two cities are Richland, which is upstream of Kennewick on the same side of the river, and Pasco, which is across the river. The elevation within the city rises from the river to a line of ridges on the south side of town that are a result of the same anticline that created Badger Mountain and Rattlesnake Mountain. Beyond that line of ridges, the city slopes up toward the Horse Heaven Hills. According to the United States Census Bureau, the city has a total area of 29.962 square miles (77.60 km^{2}), of which 28.570 square miles (74.00 km^{2}) is land and 1.392 square miles (3.61 km^{2}) (4.65%) is water. The former community of Vista is now a neighborhood fully contained within Kennewick.

The city overlies basalt laid down by the Columbia River Basalt Group, which was a type of volcanic eruption known as a flood basalt. This erupted from fissures that were geographically spread throughout eastern Washington, eastern Oregon, and far western Idaho. Most of the lava erupted between 17 and 14 million years ago, with smaller eruptions lasting as late as 6 million years ago. The nearest eruptive vent to Kennewick from this period is near Ice Harbor Dam along the Snake River upstream of Burbank and Pasco. While outcroppings from the basalt flows can be seen throughout Kennewick, they are mostly buried by sediments.

The first major sediment deposit following the eruptions is the Ringold Formation, which was placed by the Columbia River between 8 and 3 million years ago. Further deposition came as a result of the Missoula Floods. At the end of the Last Glacial Maximum, an ice dam blocked the Clark Fork River in Montana. The pressure from the resulting lake would periodically build to the point that the dam would fail, sending massive amounts of water cascading to the Pacific Ocean. The flood's movement was impeded by the Horse Heaven Hills, creating a temporary lake known as Lake Lewis. This abrupt halt in flow allowed the floodwater to drop a significant amount of sediment before passing through Wallula Gap toward Hermiston. During the largest floods, the water's surface reached 1,250 feet (380 m) above sea level. This completely covered all of the land within Kennewick's city limits.

Earthquakes are a hazard in Kennewick, though not to the same extent or frequency as areas west of the Cascade Range like the Puget Sound Region. The entire Pacific Northwest is threatened with subduction zone earthquakes that can exceed magnitudes of 9 on the moment magnitude scale. The last of these earthquakes, which could be compared to the 2011 Tōhoku earthquake in Japan, occurred in 1700. Should the next earthquake occur, damage is expected to be minimal in and around Kennewick, but destruction west of the Cascades could have a major impact of the economy of inland areas. These subduction zone earthquakes will be centered on the boundary between the North American Plate and the Juan de Fuca Plate, which is located offshore. Fault lines closer to Kennewick also produce earthquakes. While these are weaker, they can still cause damage. One such earthquake, named the 1936 State Line earthquake, occurred near Walla Walla with damage extending as far away as Prosser.

=== Climate ===
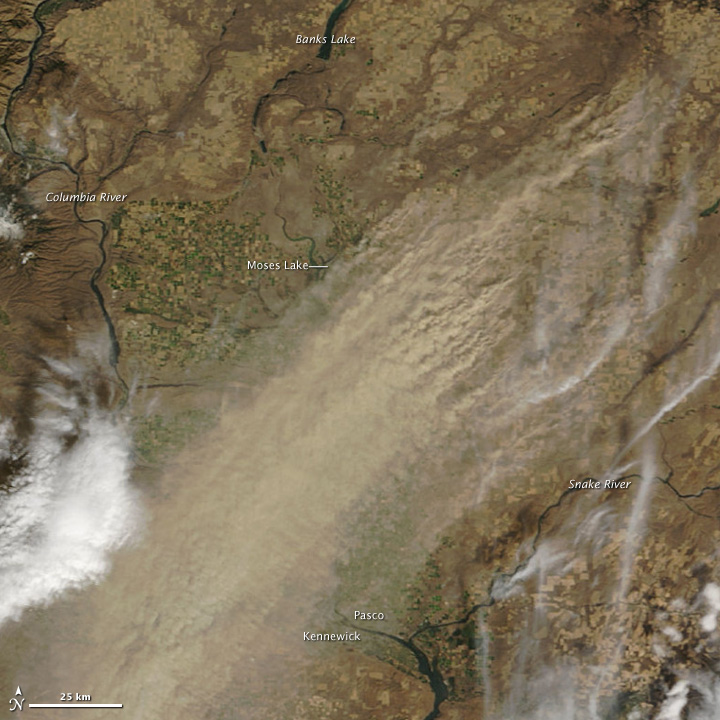
Satellite view of a dust storm in 2009 obscuring parts of Kennewick.

Kennewick has a semi-arid climate (Köppen BSk), that closely borders on a desert climate (Köppen BWk) due to its position east of the Cascade Mountains. The Cascades create an effective rain shadow, causing Kennewick to receive a fraction of the precipitation that cities west of the mountains like Portland and Seattle get annually, with values being more similar to that of Phoenix, Arizona. The mountains also insulate Kennewick from the moderating effects of the Pacific Ocean, allowing the city to experience more extreme temperatures.

Before McNary Dam was built on the Columbia River downstream of Kennewick, the river would periodically flood. The worst of these floods happened in 1948 and caused one death and $50 million ($533.6 million in 2019) worth of damage. The government responded by building the McNary Levee System to protect lower parts of town. Floods like this were the result of melting snow, and were most extreme when a heavy snowpack developed in the mountains over winter followed by a strong regional heatwave. The flood threat from the Columbia has significantly decreased since dams were built. Zintel Canyon Dam located near the Southridge Sports and Events Complex was built to protect parts of the city from a 100-year flood. While the creek that flows through Zintel Canyon typically runs dry, summer thunderstorms in the Horse Heaven Hills can generate destructive flash floods.

Lying at the bottom of a basin, temperature inversions can develop, creating dense fog and low clouds in Kennewick. This is particularly common in the winter and can last for several days. Inversions form during periods of high pressure. High pressure combining with the low angle of the sun in winter brings stability in the atmosphere, allowing denser cold air to sink to the floor of the Columbia Basin. Pollutants will also become trapped, lowering the air quality. When fog develops during an inversion, it will often limit diurnal temperature changes to just a few degrees. Temperatures in areas above the inversion will often be warmer despite being at a higher elevation. These inversions cause a major decrease in the amount of sunshine Kennewick receives annually. If a weather system drops precipitation but isn't strong enough to clear the inversion, freezing rain or sleet can fall in Kennewick.

The average annual wind speed in Kennewick is 8 miles per hour (13 km/h), but strong winds are a common occurrence in Kennewick and can sometimes cause damage. Wind and the arid nature of the region can cause dust storms. These events can happen any time of the year but is most common in the spring and fall months when farms in the region have high amounts of exposed soil. Chinook winds can also be experienced during the winter. These are formed when moisture gets removed from air moving across the Cascade Mountains, allowing the air to warm significantly as it descends into the Yakima Valley and Columbia Basin. Many of the high temperature records set during the winter months result from Chinook events.

Summer brings extreme heat and low humidity, which are ideal conditions for wildfires in undeveloped areas adjacent to town. One such fire in 2018 started along Interstate 82 south of Kennewick and burned 5,000 acres (2,000 ha), destroying five homes on the edge of Kennewick. While rare, severe thunderstorms can also cause damage in Kennewick. Severe storms can produce damaging wind, hail, lightning, and weak tornadoes. No tornadoes were recorded in Kennewick between 1962 and 2011, but one did touch down in 2016. The hardiness zone is 7b bordering 8a.

Climate data for Kennewick, Washington, 1991–2020 normals, extremes 1894–present
Month	Jan	Feb	Mar	Apr	May	Jun	Jul	Aug	Sep	Oct	Nov	Dec	Year
Record high °F (°C)	74 (23)	74 (23)	87 (31)	95 (35)	104 (40)	114 (46)	115 (46)	115 (46)	100 (38)	89 (32)	79 (26)	72 (22)	115 (46)
Mean maximum °F (°C)	59.5 (15.3)	61.8 (16.6)	70.8 (21.6)	81.5 (27.5)	91.4 (33.0)	97.9 (36.6)	103.4 (39.7)	102.1 (38.9)	92.9 (33.8)	80.1 (26.7)	68.1 (20.1)	59.8 (15.4)	104.4 (40.2)
Mean daily maximum °F (°C)	41.7 (5.4)	48.1 (8.9)	58.1 (14.5)	66.3 (19.1)	75.3 (24.1)	82.0 (27.8)	91.3 (32.9)	90.3 (32.4)	80.5 (26.9)	65.9 (18.8)	50.9 (10.5)	41.5 (5.3)	66.0 (18.9)
Daily mean °F (°C)	35.5 (1.9)	39.5 (4.2)	47.0 (8.3)	54.3 (12.4)	62.7 (17.1)	69.2 (20.7)	76.8 (24.9)	75.8 (24.3)	66.8 (19.3)	54.5 (12.5)	42.9 (6.1)	35.6 (2.0)	55.1 (12.8)
Mean daily minimum °F (°C)	29.6 (−1.3)	31.0 (−0.6)	36.2 (2.3)	42.5 (5.8)	50.4 (10.2)	56.7 (13.7)	62.7 (17.1)	61.6 (16.4)	53.5 (11.9)	43.4 (6.3)	35.2 (1.8)	30.0 (−1.1)	44.4 (6.9)
Mean minimum °F (°C)	15.3 (−9.3)	18.8 (−7.3)	26.1 (−3.3)	33.5 (0.8)	40.1 (4.5)	48.4 (9.1)	54.5 (12.5)	53.3 (11.8)	43.8 (6.6)	30.7 (−0.7)	22.5 (−5.3)	16.8 (−8.4)	10.0 (−12.2)
Record low °F (°C)	−27 (−33)	−23 (−31)	8 (−13)	18 (−8)	26 (−3)	35 (2)	38 (3)	37 (3)	21 (−6)	14 (−10)	−8 (−22)	−29 (−34)	−29 (−34)
Average precipitation inches (mm)	1.13 (29)	0.79 (20)	0.66 (17)	0.61 (15)	0.81 (21)	0.59 (15)	0.20 (5.1)	0.17 (4.3)	0.26 (6.6)	0.66 (17)	0.86 (22)	1.13 (29)	7.87 (201)
Average snowfall inches (cm)	1.3 (3.3)	0.1 (0.25)	0.0 (0.0)	0.0 (0.0)	0.0 (0.0)	0.0 (0.0)	0.0 (0.0)	0.0 (0.0)	0.0 (0.0)	0.0 (0.0)	0.4 (1.0)	0.4 (1.0)	2.2 (5.55)
Average precipitation days (≥ 0.01 in)	11.1	8.1	7.8	6.9	6.3	4.7	2.1	1.9	2.6	6.3	8.9	10.5	77.2
Average snowy days (≥ 0.1 in)	0.8	0.1	0.0	0.0	0.0	0.0	0.0	0.0	0.0	0.0	0.3	0.6	1.8
Source 1: NOAA
Source 2: National Weather Service

== Demographics ==
Historical population
Census	Pop.	Note	%±
1900	183		—
1910	1,219		566.1%
1920	1,684		38.1%
1930	1,519		−9.8%
1940	1,918		26.3%
1950	10,106		426.9%
1960	14,244		40.9%
1970	15,212		6.8%
1980	34,397		126.1%
1990	42,155		22.6%
2000	54,693		29.7%
2010	73,917		35.1%
2020	83,921		13.5%
2024 (est.)	86,728		3.3%
Population History; U.S. Decennial Census; 2020 Census

As of the 2024 American Community Survey, there are 33,463 estimated households in Kennewick with an average of 2.56 persons per household. The city has a median household income of $78,226. Approximately 14.7% of the city's population lives at or below the poverty line. Kennewick has an estimated 58.6% employment rate, with 27.4% of the population holding a bachelor's degree or higher and 86.0% holding a high school diploma. There were 35,463 housing units at an average density of 1,241.27 per square mile (479.3/km^{2}).

=== Racial and ethnic composition ===
Kennewick, Washington – racial and ethnic composition Note: the US Census treats Hispanic/Latino as an ethnic category. This table excludes Latinos from the racial categories and assigns them to a separate category. Hispanics/Latinos may be of any race.
Race / ethnicity (NH = non-Hispanic)	Pop. 1980	Pop. 1990	Pop. 2000	Pop. 2010	Pop. 2020
White alone (NH)	31,914 (92.78%)	36,857 (87.43%)	42,720 (78.11%)	50,835 (68.77%)	49,699 (59.22%)
Black or African American alone (NH)	236 (0.69%)	464 (1.10%)	579 (1.06%)	1,144 (1.55%)	1,450 (1.73%)
Native American or Alaska Native alone (NH)	—	290 (0.69%)	396 (0.72%)	477 (0.65%)	488 (0.58%)
Asian alone (NH)	—	814 (1.93%)	1,153 (2.11%)	1,705 (2.31%)	2,308 (2.75%)
Pacific Islander alone (NH)	—	—	45 (0.08%)	123 (0.17%)	336 (0.40%)
Other race alone (NH)	849 (2.47%)	46 (0.11%)	66 (0.12%)	125 (0.17%)	391 (0.47%)
Mixed race or multiracial (NH)	—	—	1,231 (2.25%)	1,599 (2.16%)	3,942 (4.70%)
Hispanic or Latino (any race)	1,398 (4.06%)	3,684 (8.74%)	8,503 (15.55%)	17,909 (24.23%)	25,307 (30.16%)
Total	34,397 (100.00%)	42,155 (100.00%)	54,693 (100.00%)	73,917 (100.00%)	83,921 (100.00%)

=== 2020 census ===
As of the 2020 census, there were 83,921 people, 30,761 households, and 20,687 families residing in the city. The population density was 3,057.34 inhabitants per square mile (1,180.4/km^{2}).

The median age was 34.3 years. 27.1% of residents were under the age of 18 and 15.0% of residents were 65 years of age or older. For every 100 females there were 97.2 males, and for every 100 females age 18 and over there were 94.6 males age 18 and over.

99.1% of residents lived in urban areas, while 0.9% lived in rural areas.

Of the 30,761 households, 35.2% had children under the age of 18 living in them. Of all households, 46.8% were married-couple households, 17.9% were households with a male householder and no spouse or partner present, and 26.5% were households with a female householder and no spouse or partner present. About 25.8% of all households were made up of individuals and 11.1% had someone living alone who was 65 years of age or older.

There were 32,242 housing units at an average density of 1,174.61 per square mile (453.5/km^{2}), of which 4.6% were vacant. The homeowner vacancy rate was 0.9% and the rental vacancy rate was 5.9%.

=== 2010 census ===
As of the 2010 census, there were 73,917 people, 27,266 households, and 18,528 families residing in the city. The population density was 2,744.8 inhabitants per square mile (1,059.8/km^{2}). There were 28,507 housing units at an average density of 1,058.6 units per square mile (408.7 units/km^{2}). The racial makeup of the city was 78.5% White, 1.7% African American, 0.8% Native American, 2.4% Asian, 0.2% Pacific Islander, 12.1% from other races, and 4.3% from two or more races. Hispanic or Latino of any race were 24.2% of the population.

Of the 27,266 households, 37.9% had children under the age of 18 living with them, 49.3% were married couples living together, 13.0% had a female householder with no husband present, 5.7% had a male householder with no wife present, and 32.0% were non-families. 25.7% of all households were made up of single individuals and 8.8% had someone living alone who was 65 years of age or older. The average household size was 2.67 and the average family size was 3.22.

The median age in the city was 32.6 years. 28.2% of residents were under the age of 18; 10.3% were between the ages of 18 and 24; 26.8% were from 25 to 44; 23.8% were from 45 to 64; and 10.9% were 65 years of age or older. The gender makeup of the city was 49.9% male and 50.1% female.

== Economy ==
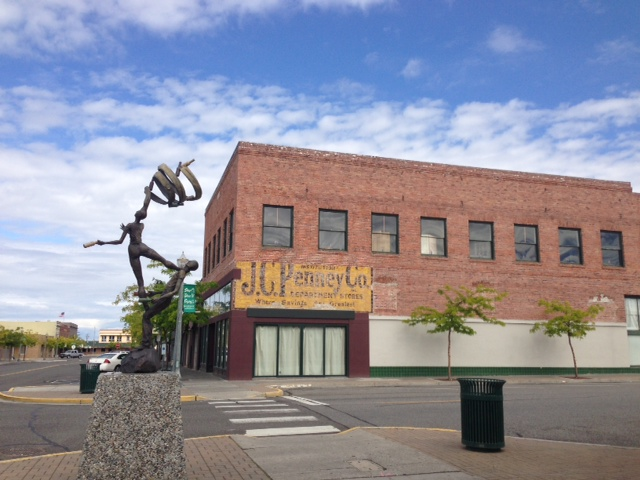
A retail building in downtown Kennewick.

Kennewick's economy is closely tied to the rest of the Tri-Cities and is heavily influenced by the Hanford Site and the national laboratory. The agriculture and healthcare industries also employ many residents. It has developed to become the retail hub of the Tri-Cities and hosts the only mall in the area—Columbia Center Mall. As such, Kennewick draws in shoppers from a significant portion of southeast Washington and northeast Oregon. Aside from the commercial area around the mall, the other significant retail districts include the historic downtown area and the newly developed Southridge district.

Many agricultural commodities are grown near Kennewick, and many of these pass through the city to be processed and/or transported to other markets for consumption. Lamb Weston, headquartered in Eagle, Idaho, a division of ConAgra Foods, has corporate offices in Kennewick and Tyson Foods does processing in town. Volcanic ash is mixed in with the rich soil of the region, creating ideal growing conditions for numerous crops. Irrigation enhanced the region through further diversification of agricultural products coming from the Columbia Basin to include vineyards and a variety of vegetables and tree fruit. In higher elevations, like much of the Horse Heaven Hills, there is no access to irrigation water, limiting agricultural activities in that area to ranching and growing wheat.

The region is experiencing consistent job growth, which is creating a large population boom. Home prices have increased by about 10% annually in Kennewick for the past several years, with slower increases having occurred before 2016. Despite this growth, unemployment remained above both the national and state averages in 2020. Recently, industrial growth in Hermiston and at the Port of Morrow in Boardman has led to an increase in the number of Kennewick residents who commute to those areas for work. This is further enhanced by a housing shortage in northeast Oregon.

== Culture ==
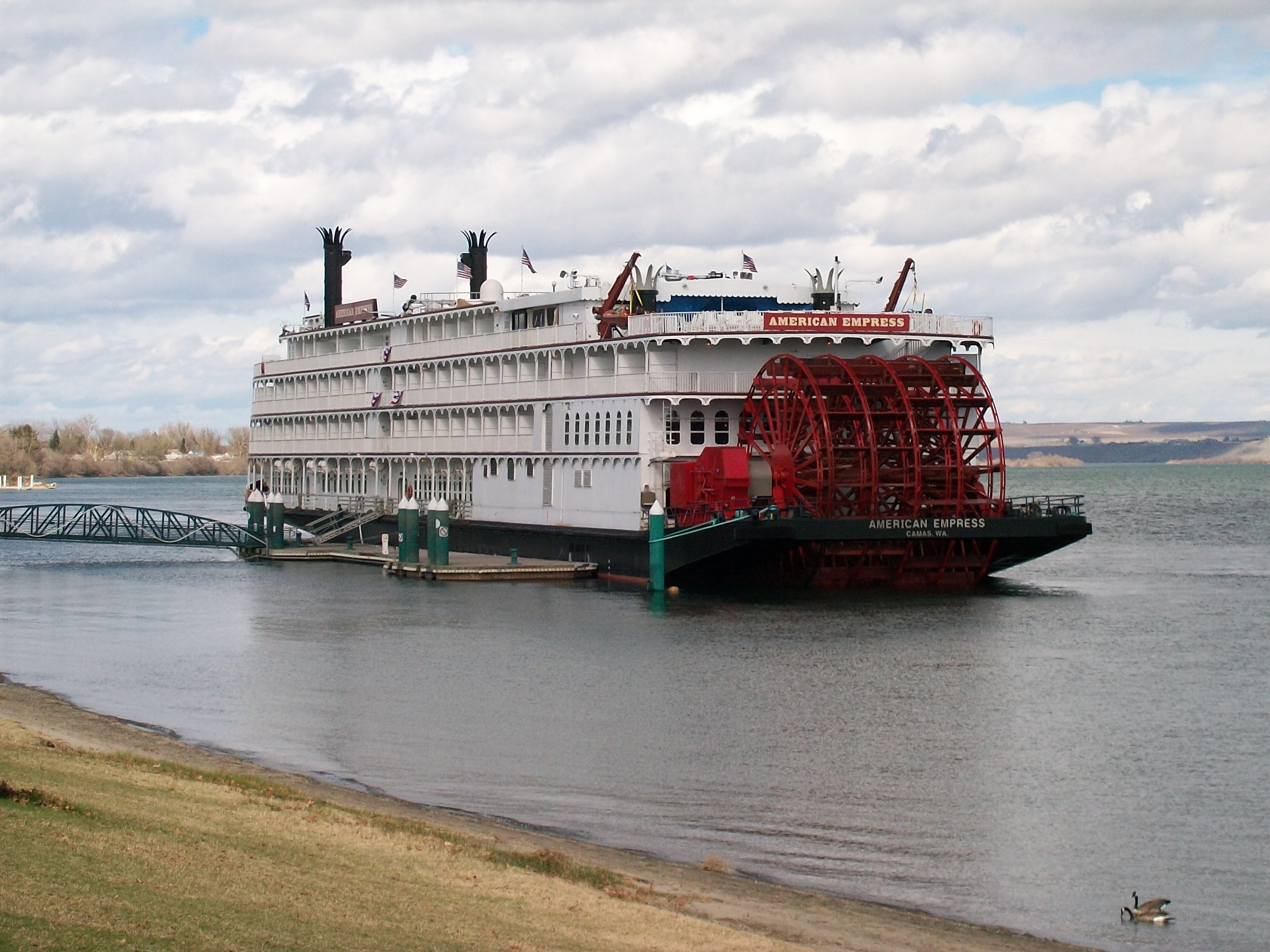
The American Empress stops in the Tri-Cities for wine tours and other excursions.

Kennewick hosts a number of events throughout the year, many of which are held outdoors in public parks during the warm season. The largest weekend event in town is the Tri-Cities Water Follies, which fill the weekend of the HAPO Gold Cup, a hydroplane race taking place every July in the Columbia River just upstream of the Blue Bridge. Activities in Kennewick that weekend include the races itself as well as an airshow. There are other events throughout the Tri-Cities during Water Follies, such as Art in the Park, a craft show at Howard Amon Park in Richland. Over 70,000 people attend events related to Water Follies each year.

Benton and Franklin Counties combine to host a single fair at the end of each summer at the fairgrounds off SR 397 in east Kennewick. Like many other county fairs across the United States, the fair has livestock exhibitions, retail, carnival rides, and concerts. Also on site during the fair is a rodeo named the Horse Heaven Round-Up.

=== Tourism ===
The arid climate and warm temperatures during the summer draw people to Kennewick from around the Pacific Northwest. Many summertime visitors engage in boating and other water related activities in the Columbia, Snake, and Yakima rivers. The city and port district work together to further develop tourism throughout the city. This includes recent improvements to Clover Island, which has a hotel, lighthouse, and the Ice Harbor Brewing Company. Adjacent to Clover Island is historic downtown, which has many antique and clothing shops. As of 2020, work is ongoing to develop the former Vista Field area in the west side of town into a mixed-use development that will include shopping.

Kennewick lies near the center of Washington's wine country, which stretches from the Yakima Valley through the Columbia Basin and Horse Heaven Hills east to the Walla Walla Valley. There are several American Viticultural Areas near town. Wine tasting is a major part of the Tri-Cities tourism economy, with over 300 wineries and wine bars rooms in the area. The city actively markets this to bring in visitors. Cruises travel up the Columbia from Portland with a stop in the Tri-Cities to tour wineries in the area.

=== Sports ===
Club	Sport	League	Venue (capacity)	Founded	Titles	Record Attendance
Tri-City Americans	Ice hockey	WHL	Toyota Center (5,694)	1988	0	6,053
Tri-City Dust Devils	Baseball	MiLB	Gesa Stadium (3,700)	2001	0	2,701

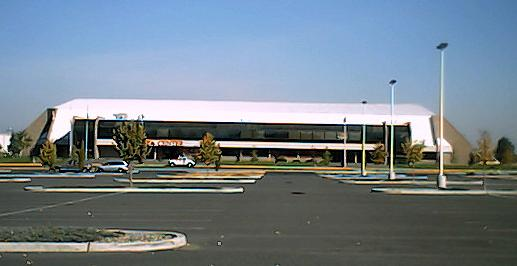
The Toyota Center.

Kennewick hosts two professional sports team, the Tri-City Americans of the Western Hockey League and the Tri-City Dust Devils (baseball). The Tri-City Americans play at the Toyota Center. The Tri-City Dust Devils (a farm team of the Los Angeles Angels) plays at Gesa Stadium in Pasco.

The Tri-City Americans were one of the original teams in the Western Hockey League, starting in Calgary, Alberta in 1966. The team moved a couple times before coming to the Tri-Cities in 1988, most recently being in a suburb of Vancouver, British Columbia. The team's move to the Tri-Cities made them the first professional hockey team to play in the area and was the catalyst for constructing the Toyota Center. The Americans have won the US Division four times, but have not yet won a Western Conference final.

The Tri-Cities Fire was an indoor football team that played in a league with three other teams. The team was founded in 2019, bringing indoor football back to the Toyota Center after the Tri-City Fever went dormant in 2016. The team folded after one year. The Fire finished their first season with an 0–12 record, the worst in the league. The Fever won one National Indoor Football League championship in 2005, beating the Rome Renegades. They went to the Indoor Football League championship game in 2011 and 2012, losing to Sioux Falls Storm both years.

Professional minor league baseball teams have played in Kennewick starting as early as 1950 with the Tri-City Braves. Other teams included the Tri-City Atoms, the Tri-City A's, the Tri-City Triplets, and the Tri-City Ports. All of these played at Sanders-Jacobs Field, which has since been demolished. The Tri-City Posse preceded the Dust Devils playing at GESA Stadium. The city presently hosts the Atomic City Rollergirls, an amateur roller derby team. Washington State University occasionally plays basketball at the Toyota Center.

=== Media ===
The only daily newspaper published in the Tri-Cities, the Tri-City Herald, is based in downtown Kennewick. The Tri-Cities Journal of Business is a monthly print publication that is also located in Kennewick and also has a significant online presence. The Journal of Business also publishes the Senior Times, whose target demographic is Tri-Citians who are 60 years or older. The city hosts Tú Decides, a bilingual weekly news publication that is both in print and online. Tú Decides is available in both Spanish and English. Richland based Tumbleweird is an alternative newspaper published monthly that covers the Tri-Cities.

Kennewick and the Tri-Cities share a television market with Yakima. Because of this, the local affiliates of major national networks are closely linked to the affiliates in Yakima. The studios of the Tri-Cities affiliates of NBC, ABC, and Fox are located in Kennewick. These are KNDU, KVEW, and KFFX respectively. The CBS affiliate, KEPR is in Pasco. KFFX does not produce any local programming, instead it acquires its news from KNDU and its parent station—KHQ in Spokane. Unlike the television market, the Tri-Cities and Yakima have separate radio markets. Sixteen radio stations are licensed in Kennewick by the FCC with others in nearby cities. There are several religious non-commercial radio stations with coverage in Kennewick. The school district operates a student-run station out of Tri-Tech. NPR member stations Northwest Public Radio and Oregon Public Broadcasting also serve Kennewick.

== Parks and recreation ==
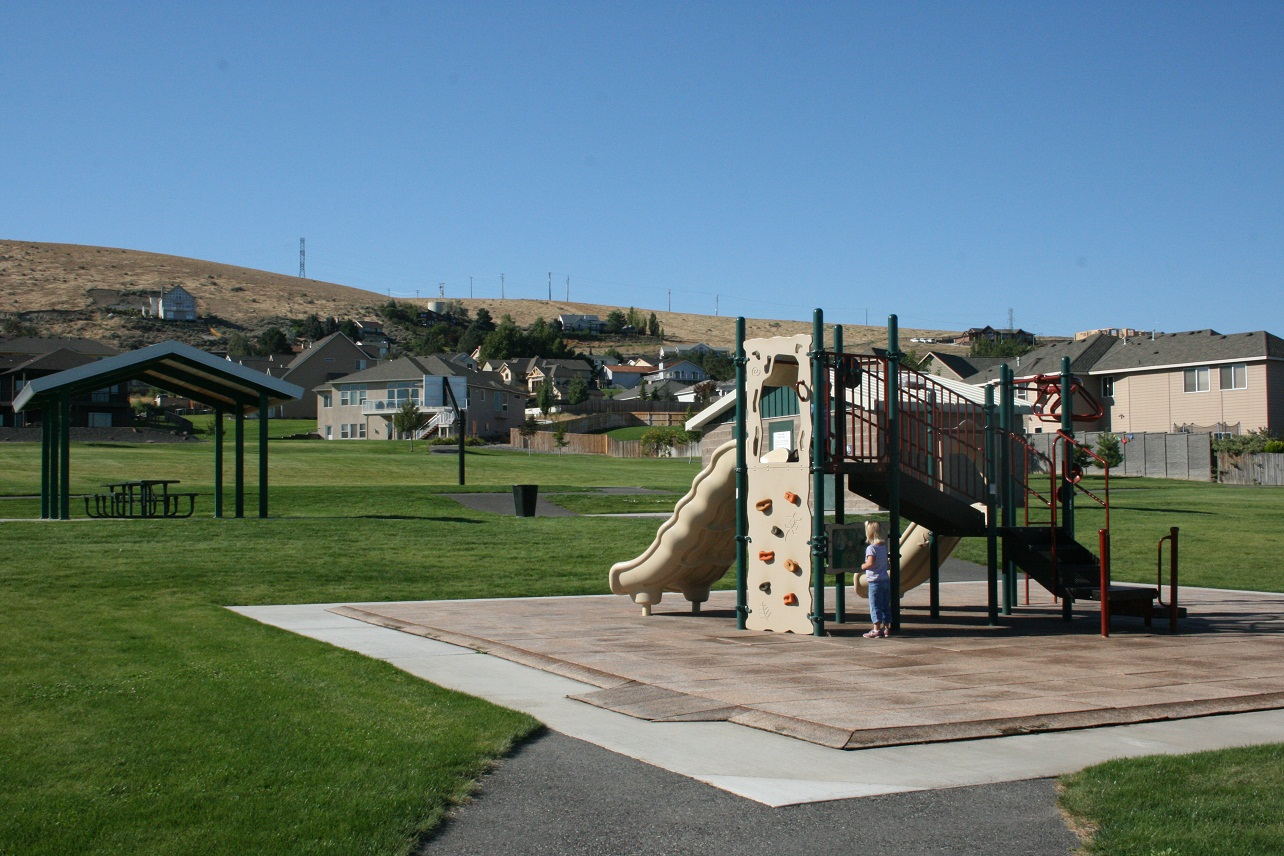
A playground in Kennewick's Inspiration Park.

Kennewick's low precipitation values and mild-to-warm weather provide opportunities for outdoor recreation throughout much of the year. The city's Parks and Recreation Department operates 27 parks plus other facilities for the public to use. Many parks have shelters that can be reserved for events, with most of them offering playgrounds. There are three athletic complexes throughout the city as well. The Parks and Recreation Department also maintains several hiking and bike trails in the city, including the portion of the Sacagawea Heritage Trail that passes through Kennewick.

The largest park in the city's system is Columbia Park, which is a riverfront area to the north of SR 240 from the Richland/Kennewick city line in the west to the Blue Bridge in the east. There are several boat launches here offering access to the Columbia River. Kayaking and canoeing is another popular water activity. The Sacagawea Heritage Trail, a bike path connecting all three of the Tri-Cities, passes through the entire length of the park. The most developed portion of the park is the east end, which has a veterans memorial, golf course, fishing pond, and a large playground. Columbia Park hosts the HAPO Gold Cup, an annual hydroplane race. The part of Richland adjacent to the park is Columbia Park West. Combined, the two form 450 acres (180 ha) of contiguous public recreation land along the river.

In the early 2010s, the city built the 52 acres (21 ha) Southridge Sports and Events Complex in the quickly growing south end of town along US 395. This property is primarily used for scheduled sporting events, such as baseball, basketball, and volleyball. That said, it also has recreational facilities that don't need to be reserved, such as a playground and open fields. Kennewick was able to secure a piece of the World Trade Center from the Port Authority of New York and New Jersey, which is located in the southeast corner of the complex as a memorial to the victims of the September 11 attacks in 2001. The complex was considered complete when the historic carousel that the city restored was opened on the site.

== Government ==
Kennewick is a code city that operates under the council–manager form of government. The city council has seven members, four of which are elected at-large while three are elected by the city's three electoral wards. The mayor is selected by the councilmembers. Kennewick's city manager serves under the direction of the city council, and administers and coordinates the delivery of municipal services. Since 2026, Kennewick's mayor has been Jason McShane.

The City of Kennewick is a full-service city, providing police, fire prevention and suppression, emergency medical response, water and sewer, parks, public works, planning and zoning, street maintenance, code enforcement, and general administrative services to residents. The city also operations a regional convention center. According to the city's 2018 audited financial report, the cities total annual expenses are $96.6 million, of which $24.2 million is funded by sales tax, $13.1 million by Utility Tax and $13.0 million by property tax.

The citizens of Kennewick are represented in the Washington Senate by Matt Boehnke in District 8, and Perry Dozier in District 16, and in the Washington House of Representatives by Stephanie Barnard and April Connors in District 8, and Mark Klicker and Skyler Rude in District 16. At the national level, Kennewick and the rest of the Tri-Cities are part of the 4th congressional district, has been represented by Republican Dan Newhouse since 2015.

== Education ==
Out of the city's residents who are 25 years or older, 88% hold a high school diploma (or equivalent) with 24% holding a bachelor's degree or better. These rates are higher than Pasco, but lower than Richland. Kennewick does not have any post-secondary institutions, but is located near Columbia Basin College in Pasco and Washington State University Tri-Cities in Richland.

Public schools located in the city are part of the Kennewick School District (KSD). The Kennewick School District has 17 elementary schools, five middle schools, three high schools serving over 18,000 students. A vocational school is operated by KSD—with funding also coming from other local school districts—named the Tri-Tech Skills Center. Vocational programs at Tri-Tech include firefighting, radio broadcasting, and auto body technology. Similarly, KSD contributes funding to Delta High School in Pasco, which is a STEM-focused school drawing students from around the Tri-Cities. KSD also operates Neil F. Lampson Stadium, located at Kennewick High School, which is used to host football and soccer games for the three high schools in town as well as for special events. Lampson Stadium has a capacity of 6,800 people.

There are five private schools for educating children in Kennewick. Many of these are run by Christian churches, including St. Joseph's Catholic School and Bethlehem Lutheran School.

== Infrastructure ==
=== Transportation ===
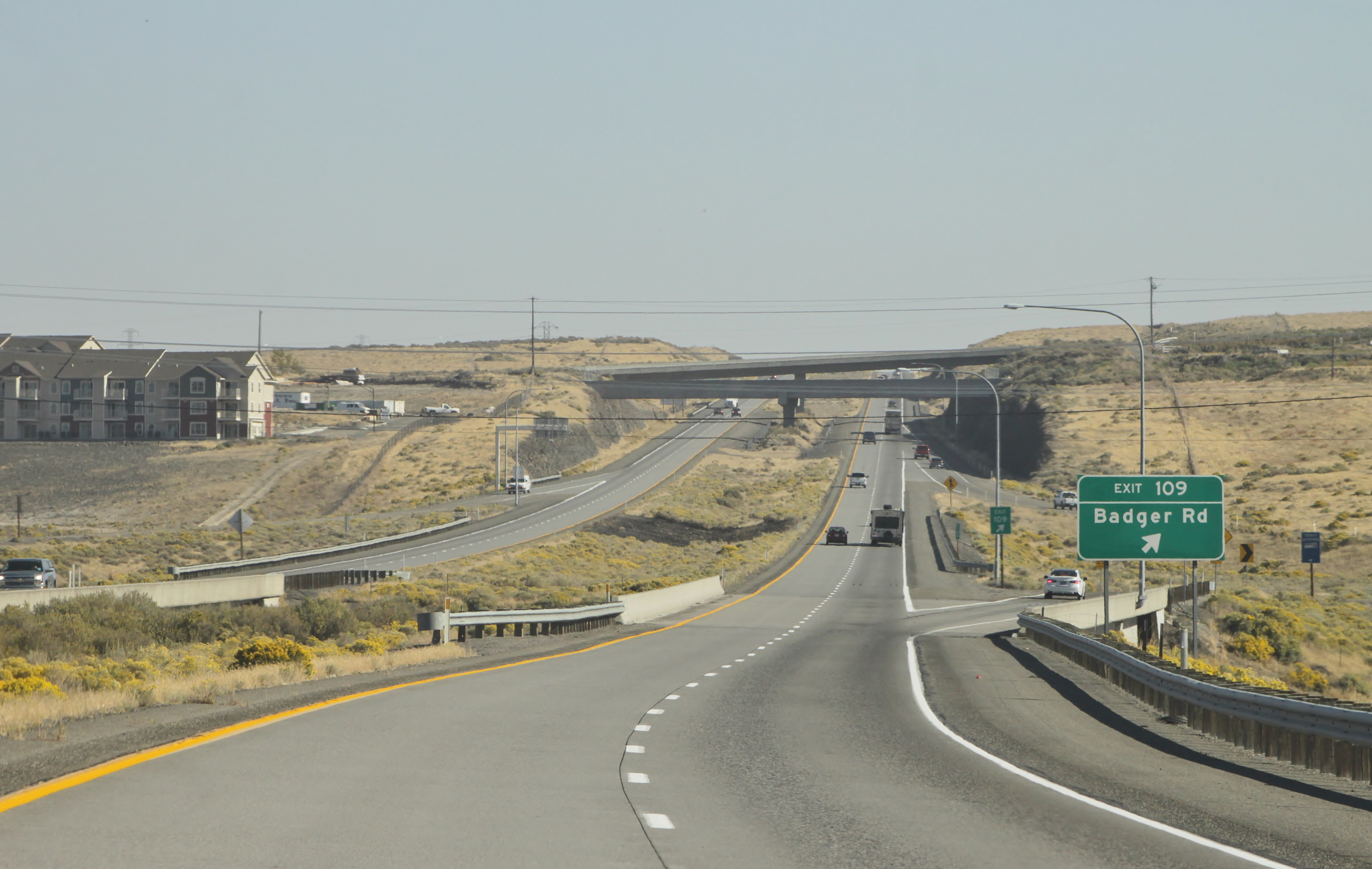
Looking eastbound on I-82 at the Badger Road interchange.

The nearest commercial airport to Kennewick is the Tri-Cities Airport in Pasco, with flights to several major international airports in the western part of the country. The busiest route is between Pasco and Seattle–Tacoma. Pasco also has the station for both Amtrak's Portland-Chicago Empire Builder and Greyhound Lines. The Port of Kennewick formerly operated Vista Field near the Toyota Center as a general aviation airport, but it closed at the end of 2013. The port plans to turn the land into a mixed-use development.

Interstate 82 bypasses Kennewick to the south, connecting to Seattle via Interstate 90 and both Portland and Salt Lake City via Interstate 84. US 395 passes through town from south to north connecting to Spokane, also via Interstate 90. State Route 240 and State Route 397 also pass through Kennewick, but these mostly serve local traffic. SR 240 connects the Hanford Site to Richland and also travels across the Columbia River on the Blue Bridge to Pasco. SR 397 connects both Interstate 82 and Interstate 182 in Pasco (via the Cable Bridge) to Finley, providing a direct route for freight to go to a chemical plant there.

Public transportation in Kennewick is provided by Ben Franklin Transit, which runs several bus routes that provide intra-city service as well as connections to Pasco and Richland. There are two transit centers in Kennewick: the Three Rivers Transit Center near the Toyota Center and the Dayton Transfer Point downtown. The transit authority also operates a dial-a-ride service for disabled persons.

=== Utilities ===
Water and sewer services are provided by the city, with electricity coming from Benton Public Utility District. Natural gas comes from Cascade Natural Gas. Kennewick contracts with Waste Management for garbage and recycling collection. Many people use irrigation water sourced from nearby rivers to water their lawns. This system is separate from the water provided by the city. Most of Kennewick is part of the Kennewick Irrigation District, with parts of the east side of town being under the Columbia Irrigation District.

Nearly 80% of Kennewick's energy is hydroelectric, with another 10% coming from nuclear. Altogether, less than 5% of the city's electricity is sourced from fossil fuels.

=== Health care ===
The largest hospital in Kennewick is Trios, located in the Southridge area. Kennewick General Hospital rebranded to Trios upon the opening of their Southridge hospital. Prior to this, the system's primary hospital was located near Kennewick High School on a campus that continues to be used for medical care. Trios also operates clinics and urgent care facilities throughout the Tri-Cities. The main Trios Hospital has 111 beds for treating patients. Having many clinics around the Tri-Cities, Kadlec Regional Medical Center in Richland is another major health care provider in Kennewick with Miramar Health Center, a Yakima Valley focused provider, also having a clinic.

Trios is a Level III trauma center and is the only hospital in the Tri-Cities that is a designated as a pediatric trauma center. Kadlec is a Level II trauma center and often receives victims from car accidents. Patients needing further care are often transported to Harborview Medical Center in Seattle, or OHSU Trauma Center Portland, which are the only 2 Level I trauma center in the Pacific Northwest. Children with significant medical needs are often treated at Seattle Children's. Seattle Children's operates a clinic in Kennewick.

== Notable people ==
- Adelle August, actress and 1952 Miss Washington USA
- Stu Barnes, former Tri-City Americans and NHL player, now an assistant coach with the Dallas Stars
- Jeremy Bonderman, Major League Baseball pitcher, Detroit Tigers
- Adam Carriker, defensive end for the Washington Redskins of the National Football League and graduate of Kennewick High School
- Rick Emerson, former radio personality
- Janet Krupin, actress, singer, writer, and producer
- Olaf Kolzig, former Tri-City Americans and NHL goaltender, Washington Capitals
- Damon Lusk, NASCAR driver
- Ray Mansfield, National Football League player, center, Pittsburgh Steelers
- Michael McShane, United States Judge for the District of Oregon
- Leilani Mitchell, Professional basketball player
- Travis Nelson, Oregon Legislator and graduate of Kennewick High School
- Shawn O'Malley, Major League Baseball outfielder, Seattle Mariners
- Scot Pollard, former NBA player
- Mike Reilly, NFL quarterback, Pittsburgh Steelers, Green Bay Packers, St. Louis Rams, CFL quarterback, Edmonton Elks
- Russ Swan, Major League Baseball pitcher, San Francisco Giants, Seattle Mariners, Cleveland Indians
- Brittney Zamora, NASCAR driver

== See also ==
- List of sundown towns in the United States
