= Bateman Island =

River island in Washington, United States

- Location within Washington (state)

Geography
- Location: Columbia River, Richland, Washington
- Coordinates: 46.245°N 119.226°W
- Area: 0.25 sq mi (0.65 km^{2})
- Length: 0.83 mi (1.34 km)
- Width: 0.57 mi (0.92 km)

Administration
- United States
- State: Washington
- County: Benton County
- City: Richland

Demographics
- Population: 0

Bateman Island is an island located on the Columbia River immediately east of the Yakima River Delta between the cities of Richland and Kennewick, Washington, in the United States. It is approximately 1 mile (1.6 km) long and 0.5 miles (0.80 km) wide (160 acres (65 ha)) and is part of the city of Richland. Bateman Island was formerly known as Riverview Island.

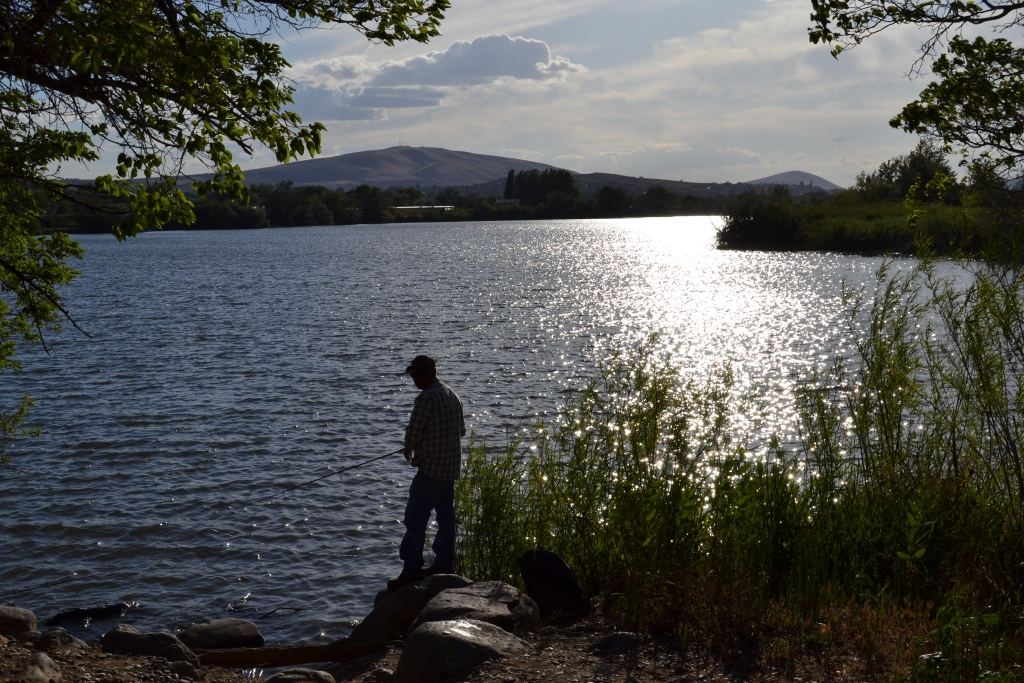
Fishing spots on Bateman Island

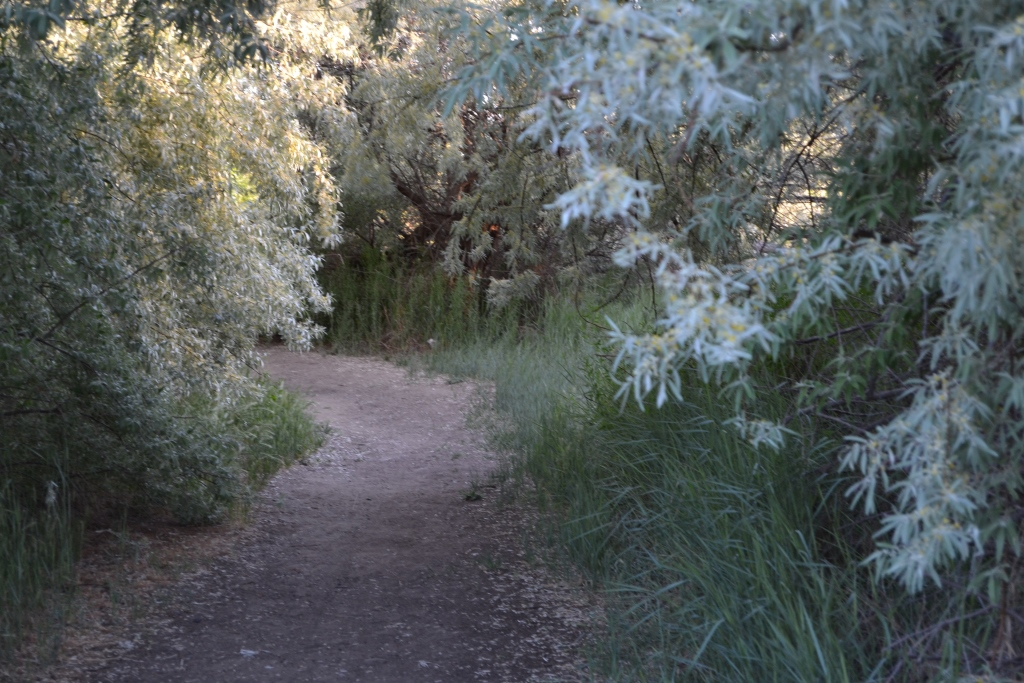
Trail on Bateman Island

== History ==
Lewis and Clark mentioned Bateman Island in their journals in 1805. William Clark and two other men made their way towards the mouth of the Yakima River, but due to the time the farthest they got was Bateman Island.

…I took two men in a Small Canoe and ascended the Columbia river [10 miles (16 km)] to an Island near the Stard. Shore on which two large Mat Lodges of Indians were drying Salmon,…there is no timber of any Sort except Small willow bushes in Sight in any direction - from this Island the natives showed me the entrance of a large Westerly fork which they Call Tâpetêtt at about 8 miles distant, the evening being late I deturmined to return to the forks, at which place I reached at Dark…

Lewis and Clark never made it past Bateman Island; it was the furthest upstream they traveled on the Columbia.

In 1872 the island was being used for wheat farming, and in 1912 it was used for raising cows. A causeway that connected the island to the shore was completed sometime around 1940. From 1941 to 1952 the Batemans used the island to raise turkeys and for farming.

The island has suffered damage from wildfire periodically, most recently in August 2001 and July 2017. In both cases, the fires were caused by human activity and led to extended closures of the island to visitation.

In 2002 thanks to support by Bechtel Hanford and with help from many volunteers, about 27 tons worth of beer cans and other debris left there over the last 60 years was removed.

The causeway to the island was removed in January 2026, since it restricted the water flow of the Columbia River, raising water temperatures and degrading the river's water quality.

== Attractions ==
Presently, the island is open to the public for numerous activities. Evidence of the recent fires is apparent, though the vegetation is rebounding quickly. The island is home to many different species of wildlife, including deer, birds, carp in the wet season, and numerous small animals. Common recreational activities include fishing, bird watching, and hiking. The island also has multiple geocaches on it. Due to the removal of the causeway in 2026, the island can only be accessed via boat or swimming.

== See also ==
- Clover Island
