= Washington State University Tri-Cities =

Public university in Richland, Washington, U.S.

Coordinates: 46°19′48.97″N 119°15′48.45″W

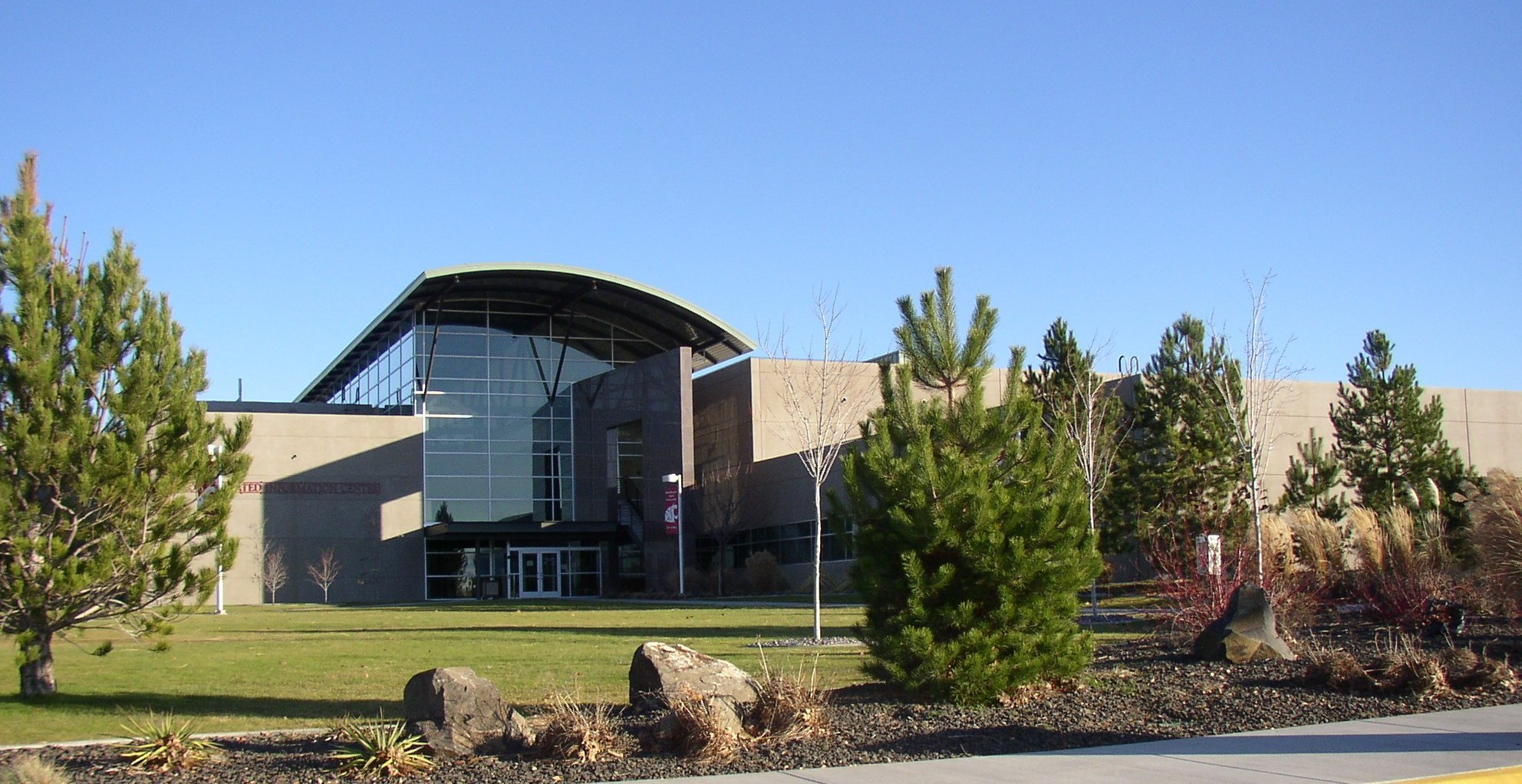
- Consolidated Information Center (CIC), operated jointly by PNNL and WSU, on the WSU Tri-Cities campus in Richland
- Type: Public
- Established: 1989
- President: Sandra Haynes
- Students: 1,716
- Location: Richland, Washington, U.S.
- Campus: 200 acres (81 ha)
- Colors: Crimson and Gray
- Nickname: Cougars
- Mascot: Butch the Cougar
- Website: tricities.wsu.edu

Washington State University Tri-Cities (or WSU Tri-Cities) is one of six campuses that make up Washington State University. It is located along the Columbia River in northern Richland, Washington, United States. With upper division and graduate programs, WSU Tri-Cities offers 20 baccalaureate, 17 master's and 14 doctoral degree programs. The campus added freshman and sophomore courses in fall 2007 to become a true four-year public university. WSU Tri-Cities has strong community support and partnerships, particularly with the nearby Pacific Northwest National Laboratory.

Washington State University Tri-Cities has been involved in wine related research since the 1930s. The university is now more involved than ever; the Ste. Michelle Wine Estates WSU Wine Science Center opened its doors on the WSU Tri-Cities campus June 4, 2015. The center features a research and teaching winery, research laboratories, classrooms, conference rooms and a 3,500 bottle wine library; production costs totaling $23 million. In addition to private support, the Wine Science Center project was funded with $4.95 million from the state and a $2.06-million grant from the U.S. Economic Development Administration. It is built on land donated by the Port of Benton in Richland. No other university in the Pacific Northwest offers such a curricula featuring bachelor and graduate degrees in viticulture and enology, a wine business management program, and a distance education program to earn professional certificates.

The Bioproducts, Sciences and Engineering Laboratory (BSEL) opened at WSU Tri-Cities in May 2008. The $24 million, 57,000-square-foot research and teaching laboratory is a partnership between WSU and the Pacific Northwest National Laboratory (PNNL) operated by Battelle. BSEL features the Biorefinery and the Combinatorial Catalysis Research Lab, plus a variety of laboratories and classrooms.

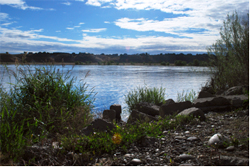
View of the Columbia River just down from WSU Tri-Cities campus

The WSU Tri-Cities campus has a neighboring bike path that follows the Columbia River and connects to nearby parks in Richland, WA.

The Art Center at WSU Tri-Cities exhibits the work of impactful local, national, and international artists; often student work is showcased throughout the year. Washington State University Fine Art Professors curate this space, often selecting work based on new technologies and contemporary practices. Social practice artists, for example, have utilized The Art Center to interact with and engage the community and regional creative class through participatory and "subject-based" art.

The Simulation and Integrated Media for Instruction, Assessment, and Neurocognition (SIMIAN) Lab on the WSU Tri-Cities campus provides support for research into Virtual Reality (VR), Augmented Reality (AR), and Neurocognition measurement. The lab includes equipment to design and implement studies on the impact of VR and AR technologies on K-16 pedagogy. At the same time, the lab uses Functional Near Infrared Spectroscopy (fNIRS) to measure brain activity in real time learning and testing situations. The SIMIAN Lab has partnerships with the Washington State University's College of Education, College of Fine Arts, and the College of Engineering, and supports projects in computer programming, art, and educational research. Dr. Jonah B. Firestone and Dr. Don McMahon are the Principal Investigator and Co-Principal Investigator of the SIMIAN Lab and work in partnership with professors at similar labs across the Washington State University system and at University of Georgia.

== History ==
Washington State University Tri-Cities was established as one of three regional campuses for Washington State University in 1990. From 1989 to early 1990 it was Tri-City University Center. Prior to 1989 it was the Joint Center for Graduate Study, which was formed in the Autumn quarter of 1969 and offered courses in graduate level technical and management topics sponsored by a consortium of universities from the Pacific Northwest composed of Washington State University, the University of Washington, and Oregon State University.
