= Sacajawea State Park =

Public park and historic place in Pasco, Washington, United States

Sacajawea Historical State Park
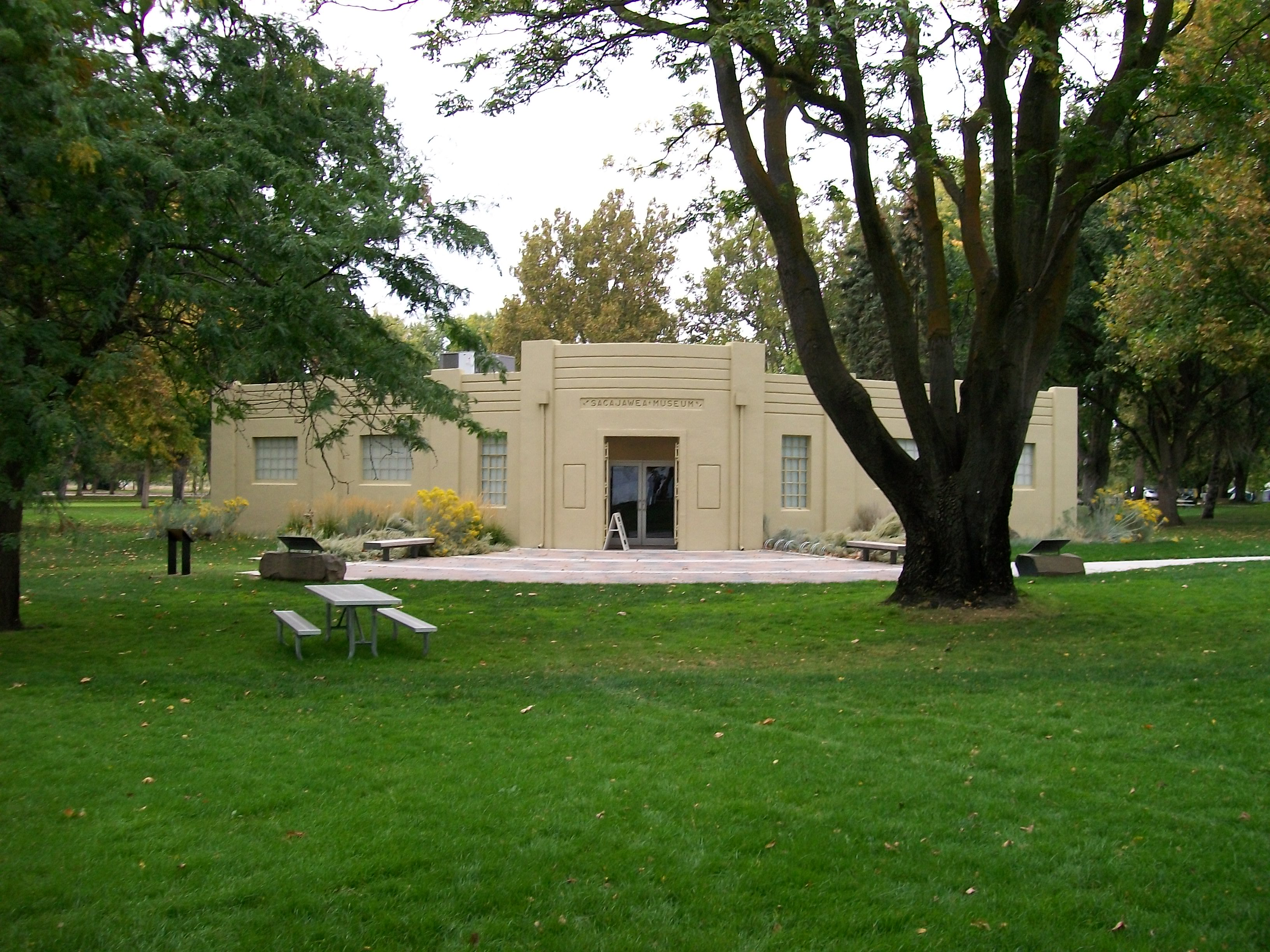
- Sacajawea Interpretive Center

- Location within Washington (state) Location within the United States
- Location: Pasco, Washington, United States
- Coordinates: 46°12′00″N 119°02′26″W
- Area: 267 acres (108 ha)
- Elevation: 348 ft (106 m)
- Established: 1931
- Administrator: Washington State Parks and Recreation Commission
- Website: Official website

Sacajawea State Park is a public recreation area and historical preserve in the city of Pasco, Washington, covering 267 acres (108 ha) at the confluence of the Snake and Columbia rivers where the Lewis and Clark Expedition camped on October 16, 1805. The state park bears the name of the Shoshone woman Sacagawea, who was an active member of the expedition married to expedition member Toussaint Charbonneau, a French-Canadian interpreter and explorer. The park's Sacajawea Interpretive Center features exhibits about her and about the Lewis and Clark Expedition.

== History ==
The park originated as a single-acre plot donated in 1927 and nurtured by members of the Pasco chapter of the Daughters of the Pioneers of Washington, preserving the Lewis and Clark encampment site. The grounds became a state park in 1931. Workers with the Works Progress Administration (WPA) constructed the park museum and three other buildings in 1938.

== Amenities ==
The park has facilities for picnicking, hiking, boating, fishing, and swimming. It is the beginning of the Sacagawea Heritage Trail, a paved bike trail that connects the communities of Tri-Cities area. The park's single campsite is held in reserve for paddlers on the Northwest Discovery Water Trail.
