= Charter College =

Charter College may refer to:

- Charter College (United States), a network of for-profit colleges in the United States
- Charter College (South Africa), a secondary school in South Africa
