= KKSR =

Radio station in Walla Walla, Washington

- Walla Walla, Washington; United States
- Broadcast area: Tri-Cities, Washington
- Frequency: 95.7 MHz
- Branding: Big 95.7

Programming
- Format: Classic hits

Ownership
- Owner: Stephens Media Group; (SMG - Tri-Cities, LLC)
- Sister stations: KALE, KJOX, KIOK, KUJ-FM, KEGX

History
- First air date: January 8, 1980 (as KUJ-FM)
- Former call signs: KUJ-FM (1980–1985); KNLT (1985–2008)

Technical information
- Licensing authority: FCC
- Facility ID: 35717
- Class: C
- ERP: 100,000 watts
- HAAT: 427 meters

Links
- Public license information: Public file; LMS
- Webcast: Listen Live
- Website: big957.com

KKSR (95.7 FM, "Big 95.7") is a radio station licensed to Walla Walla, Washington, serving the Tri-Cities area. The station is currently owned by Stephens Media Group.

== History ==
The station went on the air as KUJ-FM on January 8, 1980. On August 12, 1985, the station changed its call sign to KNLT. On September 29, 2008, the station changed its call sign to the current KKSR.

In 2009, KKSR became one of the first stations in North America to change its format to Christmas music for the holiday season, doing so at 5:00 p.m. Pacific Time on October 30. After Christmas 2009, KKSR flipped to an oldies format heavy on 60s and 70s hits as "95.7 Fun FM" on Monday, December 28, 2009. The next format change occurred on March 2, 2012, when KKSR changed formats to adult hits, branded as "Cities 95.7". On September 30, 2013, KKSR changed formats to classic hits, branded as "Classic Hits 95.7". On September 19, 2016, KKSR and KALE (along with its translator K291BS) swapped formats, with KKSR becoming adult contemporary as "95.7 More FM". On July 26, 2018, KKSR changed format to Christian contemporary under the name "Shine 95.7". The former "95.7 More FM" format moved to KALE as "106.1 More FM". On October 31, 2018, KALE switched to Christmas music as "Santa 106.1."

On April 26, 2021, KKSR rebranded as "95.7 The Bridge".

On June 17, 2022, KKSR changed their format from contemporary Christian (which moved to KALE 960 AM Richland) to classic hits, branded as "Big 95.7".

== Previous logos ==
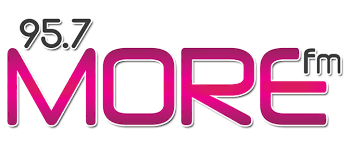
