= Tri-Cities, Washington =

Place in Washington, United States

Coordinates: 46°13′25″N 119°08′09″W

Tri-Cities
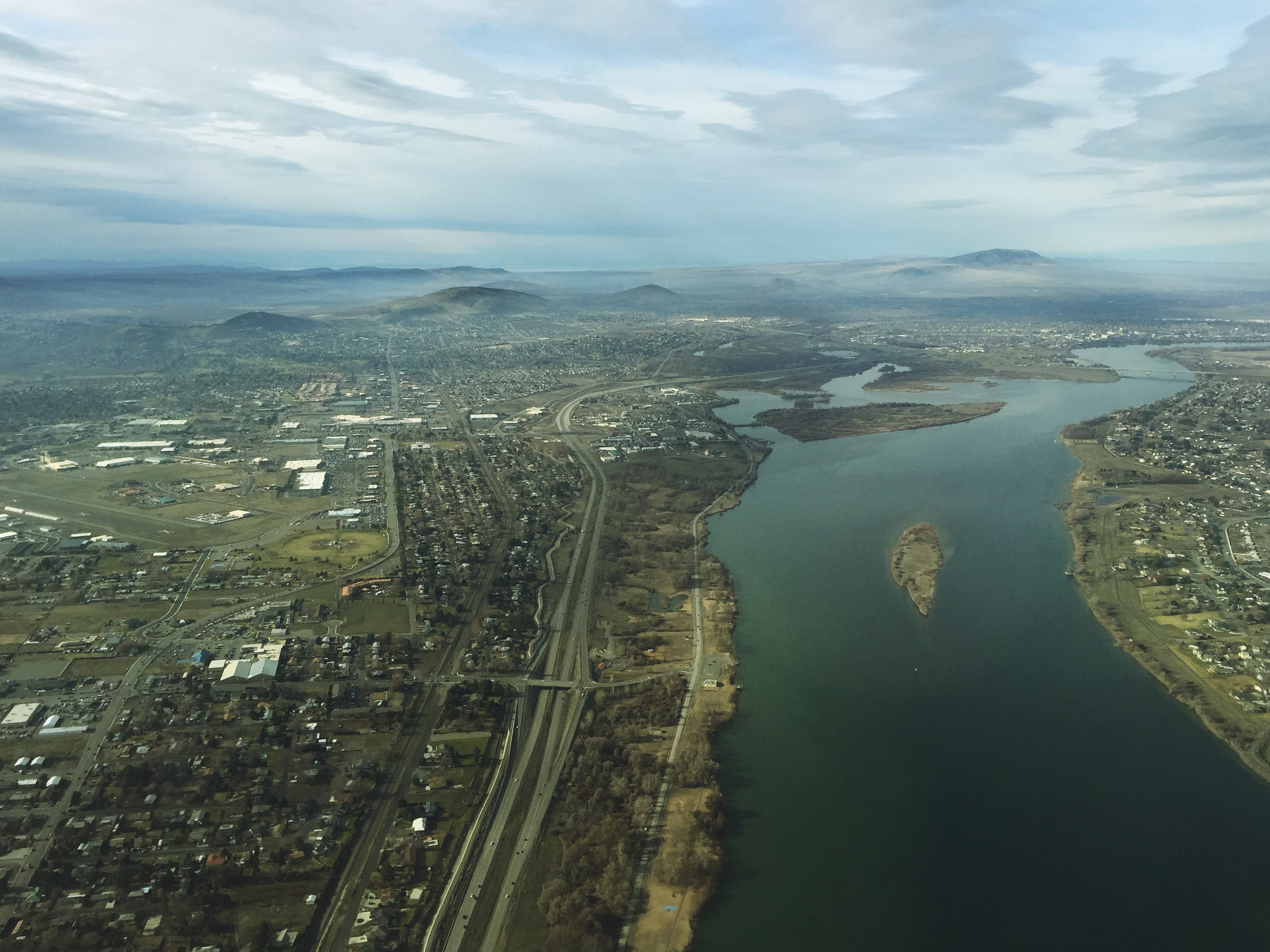
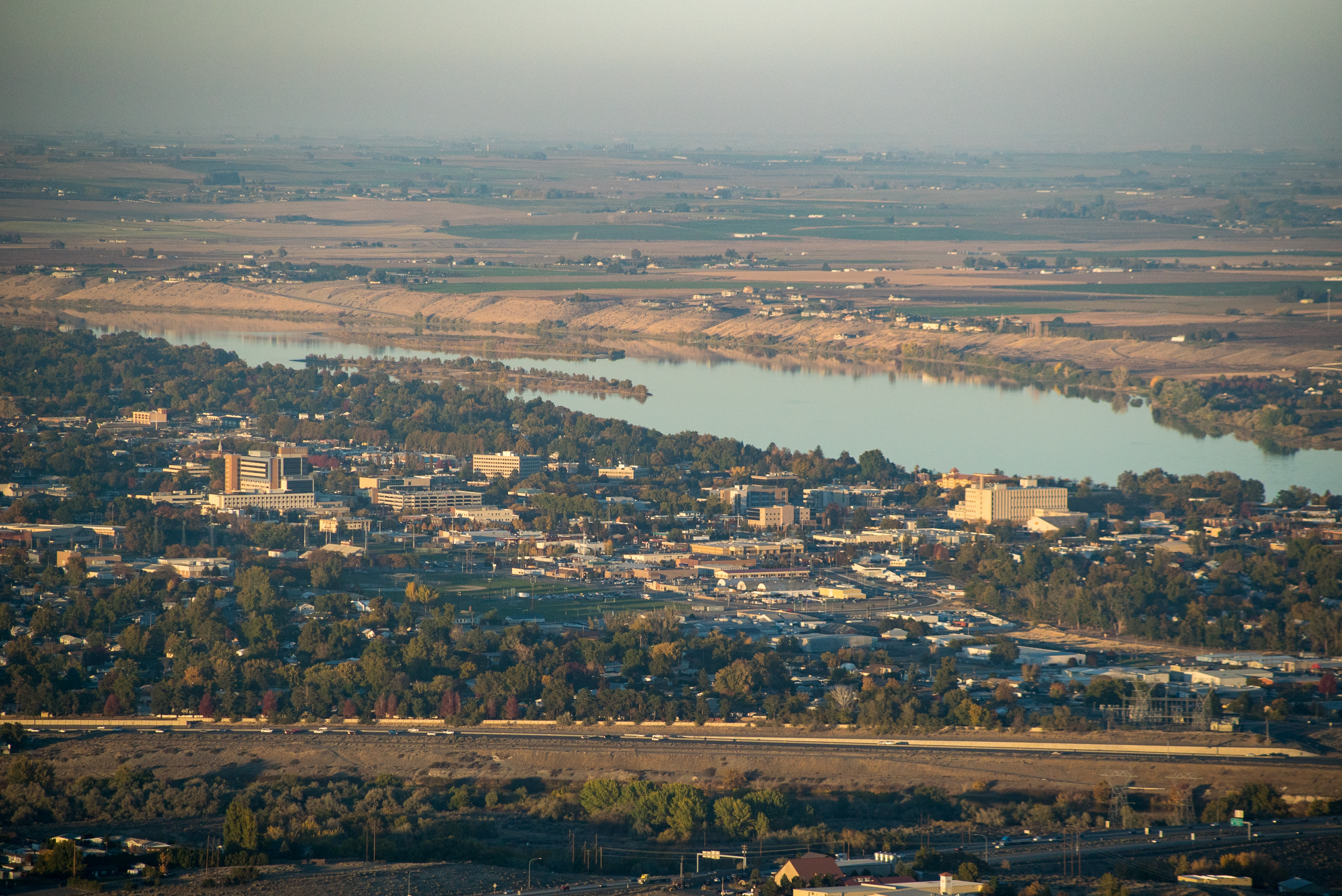
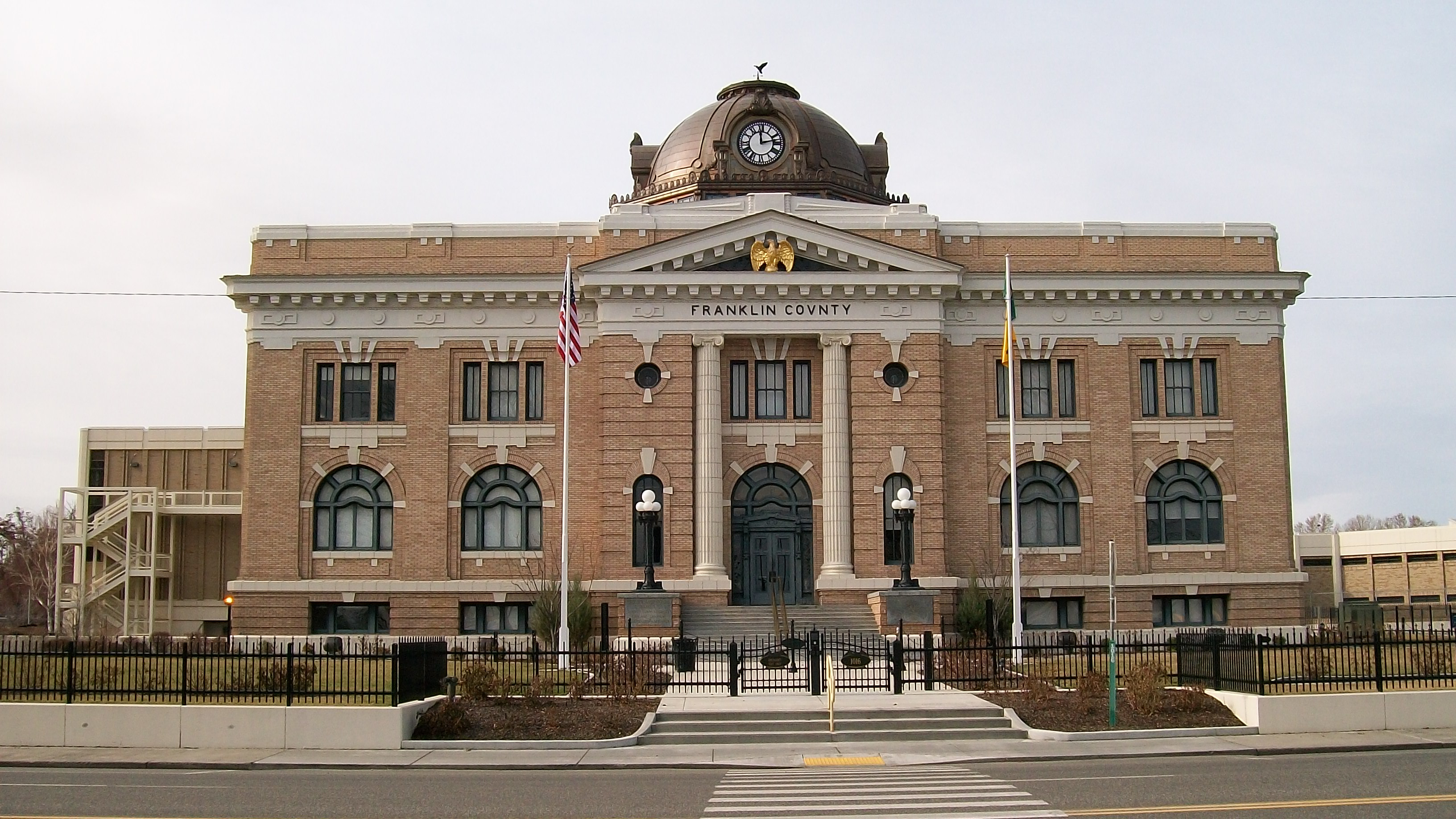
- Top: Kennewick skyline; bottom left: Richland; bottom right: the Pasco courthouse
- Nicknames: Wine Country, Atomic Town
- Location of the Tri-Cities in Benton, Franklin, and Walla Walla counties (Note: The cities of Kennewick, Pasco, and Richland are highlighted in red, while other populated places within the Tri-Cities urban area are highlighted in pink.)
- Country: United States
- State: Washington
- Counties: Benton; Franklin
- Settled: 1891

Area
  - City: 108.96 sq mi (282.2 km^{2})
- Elevation: 550 ft (170 m)

Population (2023)
  - City: 244,036
  - Density: 2,239.7/sq mi (864.75/km^{2})
  - Urban: 255,401 (US: 157st)
  - Metro: 314,253 (US: 166th)
  - CSA: 375,821 (US: 106th)
- Time zone: UTC-8 (PST)
  - Summer (DST): UTC-7 (PDT)
- ZIP code: 99301, 99302, 99323, 99336, 99337, 99338, 99352, 99353, 99354
- Area code: Area code 509

The Tri-Cities are three closely linked cities (Kennewick, Pasco, and Richland) at the confluence of the Yakima, Snake, and Columbia Rivers in the U.S. state of Washington. Located in the Columbia Basin of Eastern Washington, the cities border one another, making the Tri-Cities seem like one uninterrupted mid-sized city. The three cities function as the center of the Tri-Cities metropolitan area, which consists of Benton and Franklin counties. The Tri-Cities urban area includes the city of West Richland, the census-designated places (CDP) of West Pasco and Finley, as well as the CDP of Burbank, despite the latter being located in Walla Walla County.

The official 2023 estimate of the Tri-Cities MSA population is 314,253, a more than 24% increase from 2010, while the combined population of the three principal cities themselves was 228,482 according to 2023 estimates from the United States Census Bureau.

Tri-Cities Airport is located in Pasco and provides the region with commercial and private air service. Pasco is the seat of Franklin County, while the other two cities are located in Benton County. In 2010, Kiplinger rated the Tri-Cities among the Top 10 best places to raise a family, and CNN/Money ranked the Tri-Cities one of the top 10 best bets for gains in housing value, due to its relatively stable economic conditions since the early 2000s.

== Area history ==
=== Founding ===
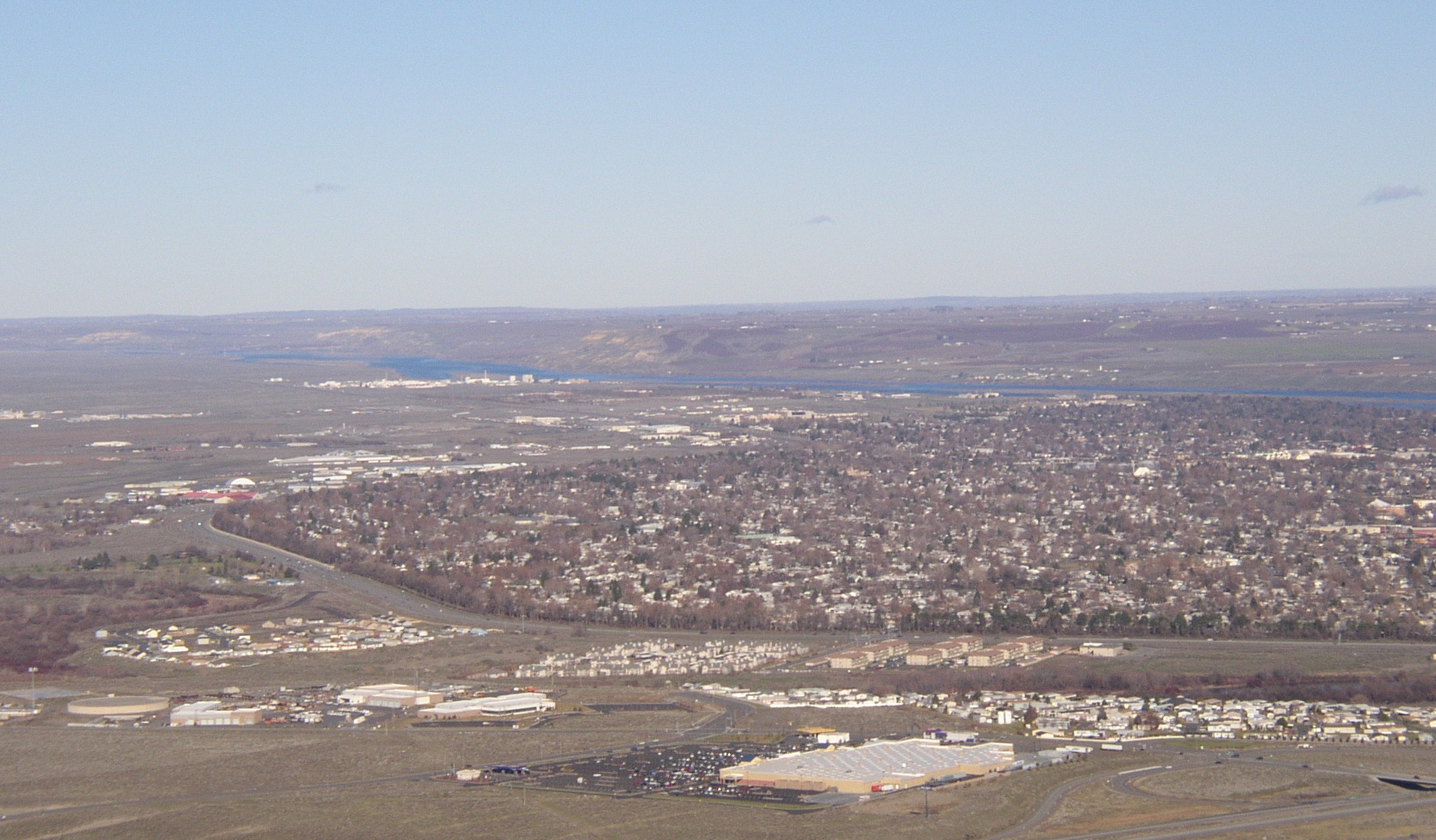
Central Richland as seen from Badger Mountain

Pasco was the first of the Tri-Cities to be incorporated, in 1891. Kennewick was incorporated in 1904, and Richland followed in 1910. West Richland—a suburb of Richland, as well as the fourth largest city in the metropolitan area—was founded by dissatisfied residents of Richland, who wished to be home owners rather than renters of government-owned houses, after the arrival of Hanford. Despite attempts by Richland to annex the community, they remained separate and eventually became incorporated in 1955.

=== Early history ===
Pasco was the largest city in the Tri-Cities, mostly due to its railroad station. It also had the most land for easy irrigation and farming and was still the largest up until the founding of Hanford near Richland.

Farming was the basis of virtually every sector of the economy in the early years. Indeed, the area remained mostly rural well into the 1940s. It did not have a daily newspaper or radio station until the mid-1940s. Even today, agriculture is a big part of the Tri-Cities, Pasco in particular.

=== 1940s–1970s ===
After the founding of the Hanford Site in 1943 as part of the Manhattan Project, Richland became the largest city of the three overnight. Richland's Columbia High School adopted "Bombers" as its mascot (complete with mushroom cloud logo). In 1970, Kamiakin High School (in the neighboring city of Kennewick) was founded in response to the continued influx of people. The economy continued to grow, but not without some turbulence. Every time the Hanford facilities experienced reduced funding, thousands of people would suddenly become jobless. During this time, other employers slowly made their way into the area, but they too would often be forced to cut jobs in the bad times. Since the 1970s, Kennewick has had the greatest population of the three cities. The Columbia Center Mall opened in 1969 on land newly incorporated into Kennewick, drawing growth to western Kennewick and south Richland.

=== 1980s–1990s ===
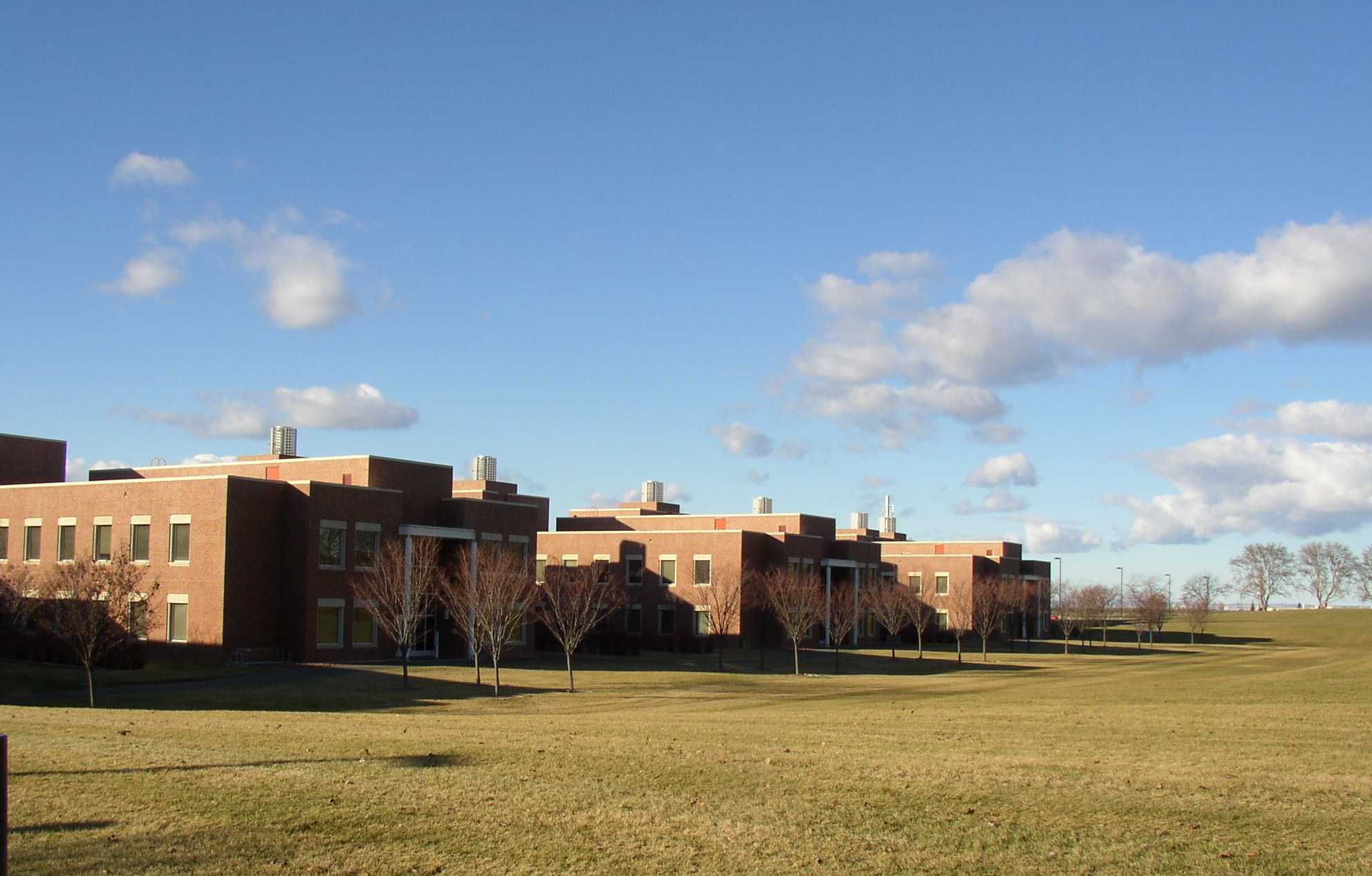
The Environmental Molecular Science Laboratory at Pacific Northwest National Laboratory, a major national laboratory in Richland

Completion of the Interstate 182 Bridge in 1984 made Pasco much more accessible, fueling the growth of that city. With the end of the Cold War, many in the area feared a shutdown of Hanford, followed by the Tri-Cities quickly becoming a ghost town. These fears were allayed after the United States Department of Energy switched the facility's purpose from the creation of nuclear weapons to the effective sealing and disposal of radioactive waste. During the 1990s, several major corporations entered the Tri-Cities, which helped to begin diversifying the economy apart from the Hanford sector. In 1995, a sixth public high school, Southridge High, was founded in south Kennewick.

=== 2000s–present ===
The 2000s saw continued rapid growth as the Hanford site hired hundreds of workers to help with the cleanup effort. Additionally, the Tri-Cities saw a large influx of retirees from various areas of the Northwest. During this time, and the corresponding nationwide housing boom, all three cities flourished and grew significantly. Pasco became the fastest growing city in Washington (in terms of both percent increase and number of new residents). In 2005, the Census Bureau reported that Pasco's population had surpassed Richland's for the first time since pre-Hanford days. Fueled by the boom, Chiawana High School was founded, and by 2019 had become the largest high school in the entire state.

Despite the economic recession of the late 2000s, the Tri-Cities area continued to maintain steady growth and a stable economic climate due in part to the American Recovery and Reinvestment Act of 2009 which directed funding and jobs to the Hanford site and its various cleanup efforts.

== Climate and geography ==
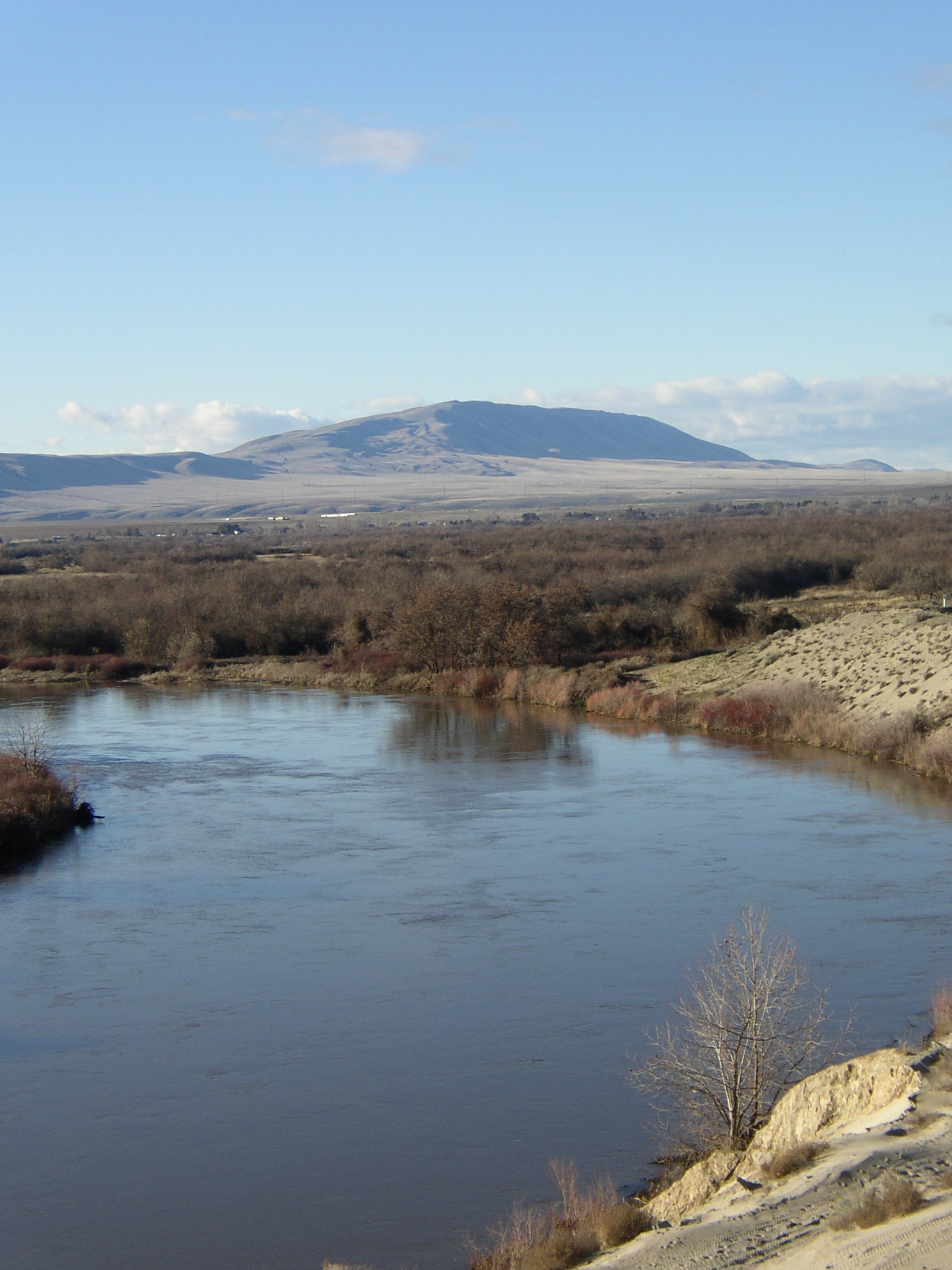
The view of Rattlesnake Mountain, a windswept and treeless ridge 1,060 meters high, from the Horn Rapids Golf Course in Richland.

The Tri-Cities are in a semi-arid climate, receiving an average of 5 to 7 inches (130 to 180 mm) of precipitation every year. Winds periodically exceed 30 mph (48 km/h) when Chinook wind conditions exist. While there are an average 225 clear days every year, these are mainly between April 1 and November 1. Temperatures range from as low as −10 °F (−23 °C) in the winter (record low −29 °F (−34 °C) in December 1919) to as high as 110 °F (43 °C) in the summer, and Richland reached 118 °F (48 °C) during the 2021 Western North America heat wave. The region receives a yearly average of seven inches of snow but has received as much as 50 inches. Due to the semi-arid climate and subsequent large amounts of sand, a perpetual annoyance to residents is the amount of dust blown about by the frequent winds. Thanks to the aforementioned rivers, a large amount of cheap irrigation is available.

The Tri-Cities makes up the largest metropolitan area in the southeastern quadrant of Washington. The rain shadow of the Cascade mountain range to the west contributes to its semi-arid climate, which is far drier than the famously wet Western Washington. The region's climate results in a shrub-steppe ecosystem, which has 18 endemic plant species. Just west of Richland, the Arid Lands Ecology Reserve was established to study the unique plants and animals there; it is the largest tract of shrub-steppe ecosystem remaining in Washington.

Climate data for Tri-Cities, Washington (Tri-Cities Airport), 1991–2020 normals, extremes 1894–present
Month	Jan	Feb	Mar	Apr	May	Jun	Jul	Aug	Sep	Oct	Nov	Dec	Year
Record high °F (°C)	74 (23)	74 (23)	87 (31)	95 (35)	104 (40)	115 (46)	115 (46)	115 (46)	102 (39)	90 (32)	78 (26)	71 (22)	115 (46)
Mean maximum °F (°C)	58.9 (14.9)	61.9 (16.6)	71.8 (22.1)	82.6 (28.1)	92.4 (33.6)	98.9 (37.2)	104.7 (40.4)	102.5 (39.2)	93.5 (34.2)	80.8 (27.1)	67.8 (19.9)	59.3 (15.2)	105.7 (40.9)
Mean daily maximum °F (°C)	41.4 (5.2)	48.6 (9.2)	58.6 (14.8)	67.0 (19.4)	76.5 (24.7)	83.1 (28.4)	92.5 (33.6)	90.7 (32.6)	80.9 (27.2)	65.8 (18.8)	49.9 (9.9)	41.0 (5.0)	66.3 (19.1)
Daily mean °F (°C)	34.6 (1.4)	38.4 (3.6)	45.8 (7.7)	52.7 (11.5)	61.4 (16.3)	67.8 (19.9)	74.7 (23.7)	73.2 (22.9)	64.2 (17.9)	52.1 (11.2)	40.9 (4.9)	34.1 (1.2)	53.3 (11.9)
Mean daily minimum °F (°C)	27.8 (−2.3)	28.2 (−2.1)	33.1 (0.6)	38.4 (3.6)	46.3 (7.9)	52.6 (11.4)	56.9 (13.8)	55.7 (13.2)	47.6 (8.7)	38.4 (3.6)	31.9 (−0.1)	27.3 (−2.6)	40.4 (4.6)
Mean minimum °F (°C)	11.7 (−11.3)	14.6 (−9.7)	21.4 (−5.9)	27.8 (−2.3)	34.1 (1.2)	43.0 (6.1)	48.4 (9.1)	47.0 (8.3)	37.1 (2.8)	24.7 (−4.1)	17.8 (−7.9)	12.0 (−11.1)	4.1 (−15.5)
Record low °F (°C)	−27 (−33)	−23 (−31)	−1 (−18)	18 (−8)	26 (−3)	35 (2)	38 (3)	37 (3)	21 (−6)	9 (−13)	−8 (−22)	−29 (−34)	−29 (−34)
Average precipitation inches (mm)	1.03 (26)	0.63 (16)	0.69 (18)	0.66 (17)	0.71 (18)	0.61 (15)	0.15 (3.8)	0.27 (6.9)	0.31 (7.9)	0.66 (17)	0.87 (22)	1.03 (26)	7.62 (193.6)
Average snowfall inches (cm)	4.0 (10)	1.9 (4.8)	0.1 (0.25)	0.0 (0.0)	0.0 (0.0)	0.0 (0.0)	0.0 (0.0)	0.0 (0.0)	0.0 (0.0)	0.0 (0.0)	0.9 (2.3)	2.5 (6.4)	9.4 (23.75)
Average precipitation days (≥ 0.01 in)	10.0	7.8	7.6	6.7	7.2	5.0	1.8	2.1	3.0	6.3	9.0	10.3	76.8
Average snowy days (≥ 0.1 in)	2.5	1.1	0.1	0.0	0.0	0.0	0.0	0.0	0.0	0.0	0.5	1.6	5.8
Source 1: NOAA
Source 2: National Weather Service (snow/snow days 1894–2019)

Climate data for Kennewick, Washington, 1991–2020 normals, extremes 1894–present
Month	Jan	Feb	Mar	Apr	May	Jun	Jul	Aug	Sep	Oct	Nov	Dec	Year
Record high °F (°C)	74 (23)	74 (23)	87 (31)	95 (35)	104 (40)	114 (46)	115 (46)	115 (46)	100 (38)	89 (32)	79 (26)	72 (22)	115 (46)
Mean maximum °F (°C)	59.5 (15.3)	61.8 (16.6)	70.8 (21.6)	81.5 (27.5)	91.4 (33.0)	97.9 (36.6)	103.4 (39.7)	102.1 (38.9)	92.9 (33.8)	80.1 (26.7)	68.1 (20.1)	59.8 (15.4)	104.4 (40.2)
Mean daily maximum °F (°C)	41.7 (5.4)	48.1 (8.9)	58.1 (14.5)	66.3 (19.1)	75.3 (24.1)	82.0 (27.8)	91.3 (32.9)	90.3 (32.4)	80.5 (26.9)	65.9 (18.8)	50.9 (10.5)	41.5 (5.3)	66.0 (18.9)
Daily mean °F (°C)	35.5 (1.9)	39.5 (4.2)	47.0 (8.3)	54.3 (12.4)	62.7 (17.1)	69.2 (20.7)	76.8 (24.9)	75.8 (24.3)	66.8 (19.3)	54.5 (12.5)	42.9 (6.1)	35.6 (2.0)	55.1 (12.8)
Mean daily minimum °F (°C)	29.6 (−1.3)	31.0 (−0.6)	36.2 (2.3)	42.5 (5.8)	50.4 (10.2)	56.7 (13.7)	62.7 (17.1)	61.6 (16.4)	53.5 (11.9)	43.4 (6.3)	35.2 (1.8)	30.0 (−1.1)	44.4 (6.9)
Mean minimum °F (°C)	15.3 (−9.3)	18.8 (−7.3)	26.1 (−3.3)	33.5 (0.8)	40.1 (4.5)	48.4 (9.1)	54.5 (12.5)	53.3 (11.8)	43.8 (6.6)	30.7 (−0.7)	22.5 (−5.3)	16.8 (−8.4)	10.0 (−12.2)
Record low °F (°C)	−27 (−33)	−23 (−31)	8 (−13)	18 (−8)	26 (−3)	35 (2)	38 (3)	37 (3)	21 (−6)	14 (−10)	−8 (−22)	−29 (−34)	−29 (−34)
Average precipitation inches (mm)	1.13 (29)	0.79 (20)	0.66 (17)	0.61 (15)	0.81 (21)	0.59 (15)	0.20 (5.1)	0.17 (4.3)	0.26 (6.6)	0.66 (17)	0.86 (22)	1.13 (29)	7.87 (201)
Average snowfall inches (cm)	1.3 (3.3)	0.1 (0.25)	0.0 (0.0)	0.0 (0.0)	0.0 (0.0)	0.0 (0.0)	0.0 (0.0)	0.0 (0.0)	0.0 (0.0)	0.0 (0.0)	0.4 (1.0)	0.4 (1.0)	2.2 (5.55)
Average precipitation days (≥ 0.01 in)	11.1	8.1	7.8	6.9	6.3	4.7	2.1	1.9	2.6	6.3	8.9	10.5	77.2
Average snowy days (≥ 0.1 in)	0.8	0.1	0.0	0.0	0.0	0.0	0.0	0.0	0.0	0.0	0.3	0.6	1.8
Source 1: NOAA
Source 2: National Weather Service

Climate data for Richland, Washington, 1991–2020 normals, extremes 1944–present
Month	Jan	Feb	Mar	Apr	May	Jun	Jul	Aug	Sep	Oct	Nov	Dec	Year
Record high °F (°C)	71 (22)	73 (23)	82 (28)	92 (33)	105 (41)	112 (44)	113 (45)	113 (45)	106 (41)	93 (34)	78 (26)	69 (21)	113 (45)
Mean maximum °F (°C)	57.6 (14.2)	60.4 (15.8)	70.0 (21.1)	79.9 (26.6)	89.3 (31.8)	95.2 (35.1)	101.5 (38.6)	99.9 (37.7)	91.5 (33.1)	78.6 (25.9)	66.0 (18.9)	58.2 (14.6)	102.4 (39.1)
Mean daily maximum °F (°C)	40.6 (4.8)	47.5 (8.6)	57.1 (13.9)	65.1 (18.4)	73.9 (23.3)	80.2 (26.8)	89.3 (31.8)	88.1 (31.2)	78.9 (26.1)	64.3 (17.9)	49.0 (9.4)	39.9 (4.4)	64.5 (18.1)
Daily mean °F (°C)	34.7 (1.5)	38.8 (3.8)	46.1 (7.8)	53.0 (11.7)	61.1 (16.2)	67.3 (19.6)	74.7 (23.7)	73.6 (23.1)	65.2 (18.4)	53.0 (11.7)	41.3 (5.2)	34.1 (1.2)	53.6 (12.0)
Mean daily minimum °F (°C)	28.8 (−1.8)	30.1 (−1.1)	35.1 (1.7)	41.0 (5.0)	48.3 (9.1)	54.4 (12.4)	60.0 (15.6)	59.0 (15.0)	51.4 (10.8)	41.7 (5.4)	33.6 (0.9)	28.4 (−2.0)	42.7 (5.9)
Mean minimum °F (°C)	13.0 (−10.6)	16.8 (−8.4)	24.3 (−4.3)	30.7 (−0.7)	37.5 (3.1)	46.1 (7.8)	52.0 (11.1)	50.7 (10.4)	40.9 (4.9)	28.3 (−2.1)	19.9 (−6.7)	14.6 (−9.7)	7.9 (−13.4)
Record low °F (°C)	−21 (−29)	−22 (−30)	7 (−14)	23 (−5)	30 (−1)	38 (3)	41 (5)	39 (4)	31 (−1)	13 (−11)	−6 (−21)	−10 (−23)	−22 (−30)
Average precipitation inches (mm)	1.04 (26)	0.67 (17)	0.64 (16)	0.62 (16)	0.63 (16)	0.56 (14)	0.23 (5.8)	0.13 (3.3)	0.29 (7.4)	0.54 (14)	0.87 (22)	1.07 (27)	7.29 (184.5)
Average snowfall inches (cm)	1.9 (4.8)	1.9 (4.8)	0.2 (0.51)	0.0 (0.0)	0.0 (0.0)	0.0 (0.0)	0.0 (0.0)	0.0 (0.0)	0.0 (0.0)	trace	0.1 (0.25)	2.3 (5.8)	6.4 (16.16)
Average precipitation days (≥ 0.01 in)	11.8	8.7	8.1	7.1	7.1	4.7	2.2	2.1	3.1	6.7	10.3	11.9	83.8
Average snowy days (≥ 0.1 in)	1.5	0.9	0.3	0.0	0.0	0.0	0.0	0.0	0.0	0.0	0.4	1.9	5.0
Source 1: NOAA (snow/snow days 1981–2010)
Source 2: National Weather Service

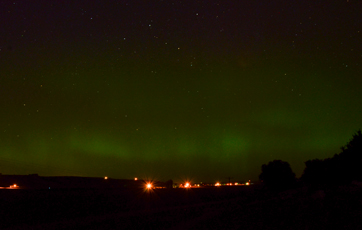
Aurora Borealis as seen approximately 25 miles north of Pasco, WA in May 2013

Limited city lights and an absence of photopollution in the Tri-Cities area allow for naked-eye and telescopic astronomy. The Tri-City Astronomy Club holds star gazing events at the Hanford Observatory. Hiking locations, such as Badger Mountain, Candy Mountain and Jump Off Joe Butte, provide views of sunrises and sunsets, studies of celestial bodies and stellar astronomy. The aurora borealis (or northern lights) is sometimes visible nearby.

== Education ==
=== Colleges and universities ===
Higher education institutions in the Tri-Cities area include:

- Washington State University Tri-Cities, a four-year branch campus of Washington State University located in Richland (2000 students).
- Columbia Basin College, a two-year institution which offers a four-year Bachelor of Applied Science program in Applied Management (8,000 students). The main campus is located in Pasco while a branch campus and a nursing school are located in Richland.
- Tri-Tech Skills Center, a smaller vocational school run by the Kennewick School District and located in Kennewick. Students from Pasco School District and Richland School District Can also apply to Tri-Tech.
- Charter College, located in Pasco offering technical and medical programs such as Medical Assisting, Dental Assisting and HVAC.

In 2005, the State of Washington approved the transition of the existing Washington State University branch campus in Richland from a two-year to a four-year campus. In the fall of 2007 the campus admitted its first undergraduate students. Offering a range of programs, the campus focuses on biotechnology, computer science, and engineering, due to the nearby Pacific Northwest National Laboratory and Hanford Site. The university also offers a range of majors, including English, history, and other liberal arts and sciences.

Columbia Basin College also offers higher education courses for residents of the Tri-Cities, as well as the Columbia Basin from Mattawa, Washington, which is 50 miles (80 km) away, to Umatilla, Oregon, 30 miles (48 km) away.

=== Primary and secondary schools ===
Each city provides its own schooling services through their respective school districts—Kennewick's, Pasco's, and Richland's.

Public high schools in the Kennewick School District include Kennewick High School, Kamiakin High School, Southridge High School. Public high schools in the Pasco School District are Pasco High School, Chiawana High School, Sageview High School and New Horizons High School. In the Richland School District, public high schools include Richland High School, Hanford High School, and River's Edge High School.

The area also contains two regional high schools, Tri-Tech and Delta High. Tri-Tech is a technical/vocational high school in the Kennewick School District that is attended by students from all over the Tri-Cities area. Delta High is a science and technology focused high school located in Pasco. It is sponsored by Pasco, Kennewick, and Richland's school districts, Battelle, Washington State University Tri-Cities, and Columbia Basin College.

There are also several private and faith-based schools in the area, including Tri-Cities Prep Highschool (Pasco), Kingspoint Christian School K–12 (Pasco), Tri-Cities Adventist School (Pasco), Liberty Christian School (Richland), Bethlehem Lutheran K–8 (Kennewick), and Calvary Christian School K–8 (Kennewick).

== Industry ==
=== Early Hanford ===
In the 1940s, the Hanford site employed a majority of residents. The United States government built a top-secret facility to produce and separate plutonium for nuclear weapons, and decided on an area just north of then-tiny Richland. The government built temporary quarters for the more than 45,000 workers and built permanent homes and infrastructure for other personnel in Richland. The city had an overnight population explosion, yet virtually no one knew what the purpose of Hanford was until the destruction of Nagasaki on August 9, 1945, by an atomic weapon containing Hanford-produced plutonium. After World War II Hanford continued work on creating material for nuclear weapons during the Cold War. After the fall of the USSR in 1991, Hanford, the site of severe nuclear contamination, changed its mission from plutonium production to environmental cleanup and restoration.

=== Modern Hanford ===
The Hanford site is one of the largest cleanup projects in the United States, costing over $1.4 million per day to turn over 53 million US gallons (200 Ml) of nuclear waste into glass through a process called vitrification. Vitrification is a proven technique in the disposal and long-term storage of nuclear waste or other hazardous wastes. Original estimates were $2.8 billion over five years to clean up the waste, though estimates quickly grew in the early 1990s to $50 billion with a completion date of 30 years. As of 2021, the additional cost to complete cleanup is now projected to be between $300 and $640 billion with an estimated completion date of 2078. Over 18 percent of all jobs in the Benton Franklin County area are nuclear-related, research-related, or engineering.

=== Columbia Generating Station ===
The Columbia Generating Station operates ten miles outside of Richland and is the only nuclear power station in the Pacific Northwest. It uses a boiling water reactor with a type 5 layout and is licensed to operate until 2043. After nine years of construction, the plant began operating after a long and costly construction process that resulted in the largest municipal bond default in U.S. history. Originally operated and owned by the Washington Public Power Supply System (WPPSS), the coalition changed its name to Energy Northwest in 1998 because of the negative association with the original name (commonly pronounced "Whoops" in place of WPPSS). WPPSS defaulted on $2.25 billion in bonds resulting in payments that exceeded $12,000 per customer, an amount which was finally paid out in 1992 (10 years later). Its 1,190 gross megawatts can power the city of Seattle, and is equivalent to about 10 percent of the electricity generated in Washington and 4 percent of all electricity used in the Pacific Northwest and has several safeguards to protect against seismic, natural, or terrorist threats.

=== Agriculture ===
The Tri-Cities economy has historically been based on farming and the Hanford Nuclear Reservation. From Pasco's incorporation in 1891 to present day, the Tri-Cities have had a large degree of farming thanks to irrigation by the three nearby rivers. Wheat is the most commonly grown product; however, large amounts of apples, corn, grapes are also grown, along with potatoes, and other products including asparagus. Cherries are also grown in the region.

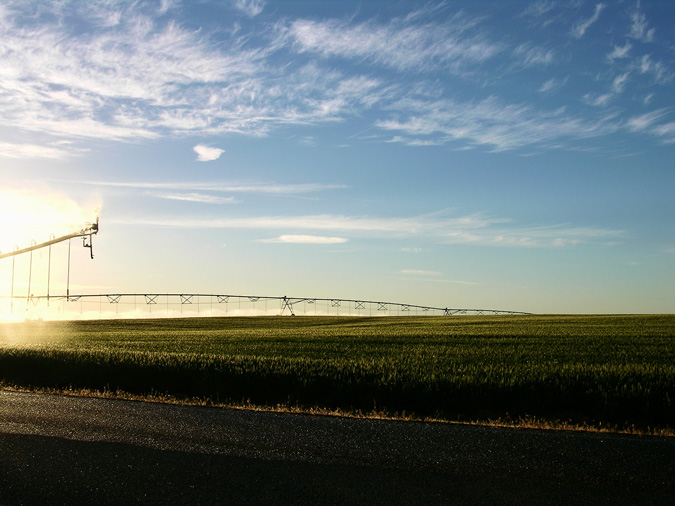
Photo taken along Clark Rd in Pasco, WA.

Grapes grown in the region are essential to the wine industry. Wineries draw a large population of tourists. With 160 wineries in the Columbia Valley, this industry accounts for $1 billion annually in Benton County alone.

The Tri-Cities' climate allows the region to have a broad and sustainable agricultural economy. Local industries provide employment for thousands of people in the Tri-Cities area. Some of the top 20 employers in agriculture include ConAgra, Tyson Foods, and Broetje Orchards. Agriculture makes up 9.5% of employment in Tri-Cities and local businesses combined employ thousands of people. In 2012, the state of Washington was rated No. 1 in the nation when it comes to growing apples, hops, spearmint oil, sweet cherries, pears, concord grapes and processing carrots. The Mid-Columbia region including the Tri-Cities grows most of these crops. The region's climate and irrigation from nearby rivers, like the Columbia, Snake, and Yakima rivers, allow farmers to produce corn, hay, wheat and potatoes. In Washington there are 39,500 farms; 1,630 of these farms are located in Benton County and 891 are located in Franklin County.

=== Local cuisine ===
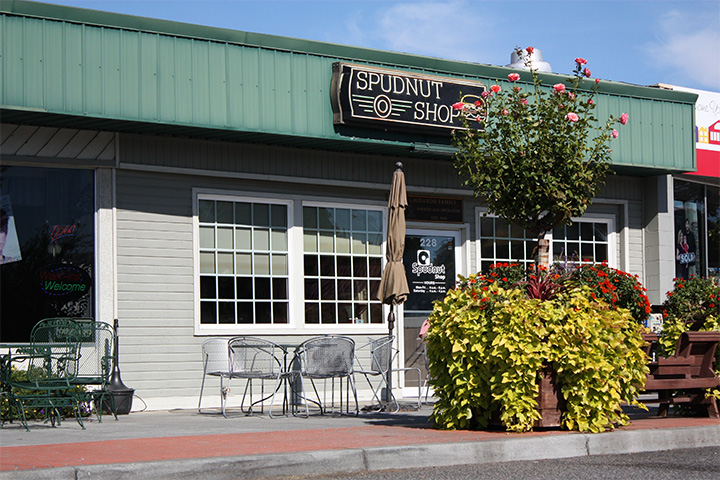
The Spudnut Shop located in the Uptown Shopping Center in Richland

The Tri-Cities has a number of locally owned and operated restaurants. The Spudnut Shop, for example, located in northern Richland, was opened in 1948 and has been family-run ever since. The Travel Channel featured The Spudnut Shop and their donuts "made from potato flour and then deep-fried to perfection." Carmine's, also a family owned restaurant in the region, served Italian food in a historic home that was constructed in downtown Kennewick in 1929. The owners retired in 2021, closing the restaurant after celebrating their 59th wedding anniversary. Also notable is the BBQ restaurant Porter's which began as a food truck in Richland and has been featured on Diners, Drive-Ins and Dives hosted by Guy Fieri.

=== Wine and breweries ===
In contrast to Seattle, the western slopes of the Cascade Mountains, and the rain forests of the Olympic Peninsula, the Columbia Valley enjoys long, warm, summer days, and crisp cool nights. The dry weather combined with rich volcanic soils and controlled irrigation produce near-perfect conditions for the cultivation of wine grapes.

The range of varietals grown throughout the region include Chardonnay, Cabernet Sauvignon, Merlot, Riesling, and Pinot Noir.

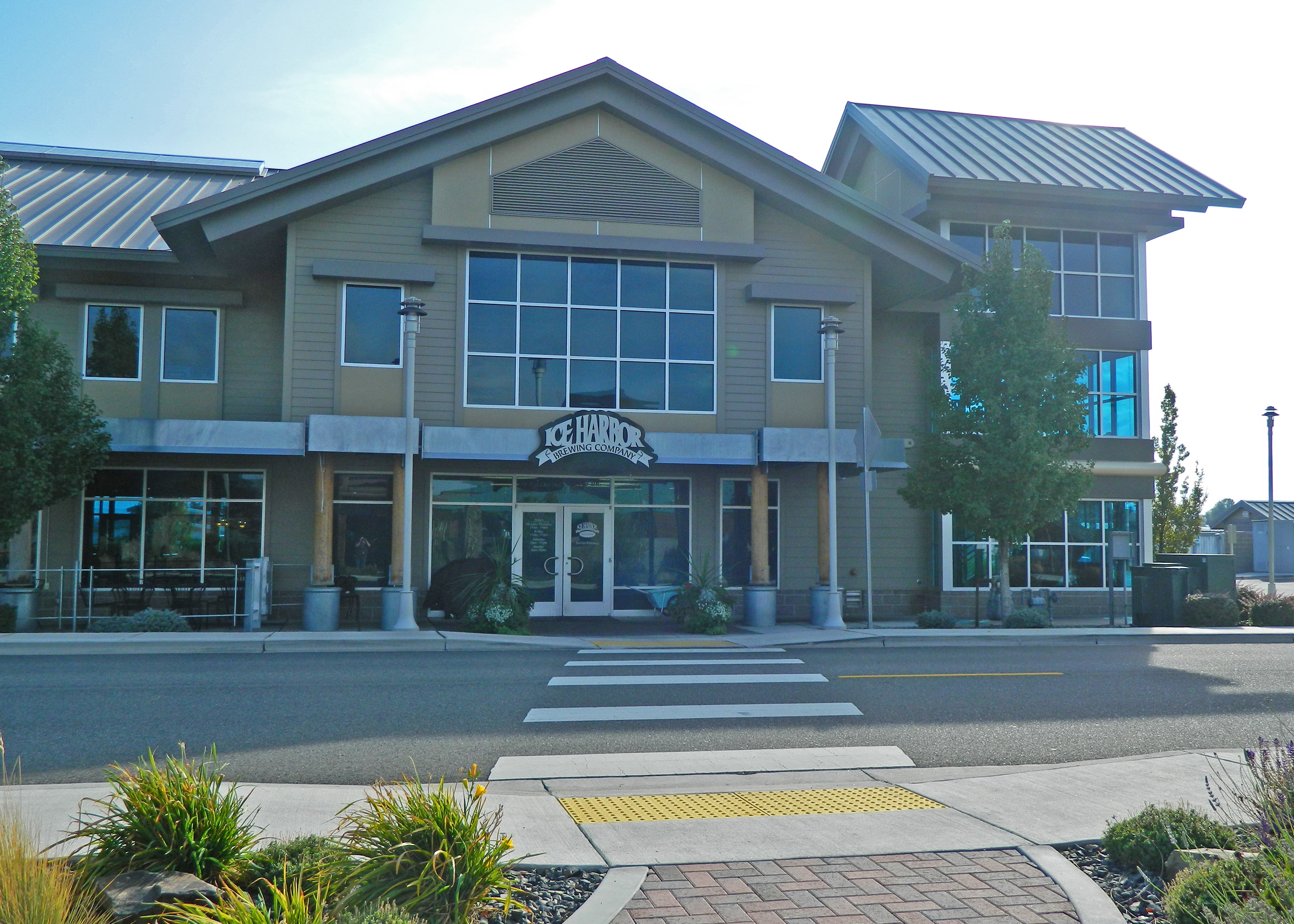
Ice Harbor Brewery

The Tri-Cities region has a rich winery culture that attract tourists and visitors to the area. Some of the local microbreweries include: Ice Harbor Brewery Company, Atomic Ale Brewpub and Eatery, and White Bluff Brewing. This brewery was founded in 1996 and has two locations in the Tri-Cities metropolitan area, one in downtown Kennewick and one on Clover Island. In 2010, Ice Harbor received a bronze award for their Sternwheeler Stout, Runaway Red Ale, Indian Pale Ale (IPA) and a Silver Award for their Tangerine "ExBEERience" Hefeweizen at the Washington Beer Awards competition. Another micro-brewery, the Atomic Ale Brew Pub & Eatery, is located in Richland and serves as Tri-Cities oldest brewpub and was opened in 1997.

=== Farmers markets ===
The Market at the Parkway in Richland, WA is a farmers market with takes place every Friday from June through October. Local artists provide music and crafts, and Fresh produce, specialty foods, arts and crafts are sold at the Richland farmers market.

The Pasco Farmers Market, which celebrated 25 years in 2013, takes place every Wednesday and Saturday morning beginning in May through the end of October, and consists primarily of fresh produce.

A farmers market, located at the corner of Benton Street and Kennewick Avenue, takes place on Thursday evenings and runs annually from the end of May through October.

=== Other industries ===
The Tri-Cities is home to automobile manufacturer SSC North America. Other corporations with facilities in the Tri-Cities area include Amazon, Areva, Battelle Memorial Institute, Bruker, Lamb Weston, Fluor Corporation, Kaiser Aluminum, Lampson Cranes, Lockheed Martin, Reser's Fine Foods, Tyson Foods, URS Corporation, US Cellular, UniWest, and Aecom.

== Infrastructure ==
=== Hospitals ===
Hospitals in the Tri-Cities are include Kadlec Regional Medical Center (Richland, Kennewick), Our Lady of Lourdes Hospital and Lourdes Medical Center (Downtown Pasco, Richland, West Pasco), and Trios Health (Downtown Kennewick and West Kennewick).

=== Libraries ===
Mid-Columbia Libraries, an intercounty library system serving Benton, Franklin, and Adams Counties, is based in Kennewick, Washington, and operates five public branch libraries in the Tri-Cities, and seven branch libraries in the surrounding area. Customers of Mid-Columbia Libraries have access to nearly 400,000 books, movies, magazines, and downloadable eBooks and audiobooks; the library system spends over $1 million annually on new materials and has the highest expenditure per capita for materials of any public library in Southeastern Washington. Richland Public Library is a single library operated by the City of Richland and is not part of the much larger library system.

Public libraries in the Tri-Cities include:

- Mid-Columbia Libraries: Keewaydin Park Branch (Kennewick, Washington)
- Mid-Columbia Libraries: Kennewick Branch (Kennewick, Washington) – Main Library
- Mid-Columbia Libraries: Pasco Branch (Pasco, Washington)
- Mid-Columbia Libraries: West Pasco Branch (Pasco, Washington)
- Mid-Columbia Libraries: West Richland Branch (West Richland, WA)
- Richland Public Library (Richland, Washington)

Other libraries in the Tri-Cities include:

- Benton-Franklin County Law Library (Pasco, Washington)
- Columbia Basin College Library (Pasco)
- Columbia Basin Regional Medical Library (Richland, Washington)
- Neurological Resource Center Library (Richland, Washington)
- Pacific Northwest National Laboratory Technical Library (Richland, Washington)
- Washington State University Tri-Cities Library (Richland, Washington)

=== Transportation ===
==== Airports ====
Airports located the area include Tri-Cities Airport in Pasco (IATA: PSC, ICAO: KPSC) which has passenger and commercial flights and Richland Airport in Richland (IATA: RLD, ICAO: KRLD) which serves private aircraft.

==== Interstates and major highways ====
- Interstate 82 runs along the southern edge of Kennewick connecting the Tri-Cities with major cities like Seattle via Interstate 90, and both Portland, Oregon and Salt Lake City via Interstate 84.
- Interstate 182 follows the Yakima River through Richland, crosses the Columbia River on the Interstate 182 Bridge, and continues through Pasco to its terminus with U.S. Route 395
- US 395 runs north through Kennewick, crosses the Columbia River on the Blue Bridge and continues through Pasco and then north to Interstate 90 in Ritzville, Washington.
- SR 397 runs from Finley up to Pasco, crossing the Columbia River through the Cable Bridge continuing northbound to I-90 and Spokane.
- US 12 is cosigned with Interstate 182 through the Tri-Cities and continues past U.S. Route 395 across the Snake River towards Burbank, Walla Walla, and Lewiston, Idaho.
- State Route 240 runs from Kennewick through Richland, (also known as the bypass highway), then just west of the Hanford Nuclear Reservation where it intersects with SR 24.

==== Local transit ====
Ben Franklin Transit provides public bus service throughout the Tri-Cities as well as TransPlus Night and Sunday limited capacity curb-to-curb service for $3 each way.

Local cab service exists, and Uber entered the Kennewick market in December 2016, with expansion into Richland and Pasco the following year.

==== Passenger rail ====
Amtrak provides connection to the daily Empire Builder serving Portland and Chicago.

== Recreation ==
Due to the dry climate, hot summers, and mild winters, the Tri-Cities offers a variety of outdoor activities.

=== Golf ===
The area is home to 10 golf courses which can be played nearly year-round. These include Canyon Lakes, Columbia Park, and Zintel Creek Golf Clubs in Kennewick; Sun Willows Golf Club and Pasco Golfland in Pasco; and Columbia Point, Horn Rapids, West Richland, Meadow Springs, and Buckskin Golf clubs in Richland.

=== Running ===
The Tri-Cities metropolitan area has a number of outdoor trail running locations. A number of competitive running events are held throughout the year, including a number which are sponsored by the Three Rivers Road Runners Club (3RRR). They include:

- Columbia River Classic (Est. 1975) – Oldest "fun run" in the Tri-Cities. It features both a 10-mile and 2-mile run.
- Tri-Cities Marathon (Est. 1980) – Run begins in Richland and continues through Pasco and Kennewick along the Columbia River.
- St. Paddy's Foot Race and Leprechaun Dash (Est. 1980) – Annual event where the local elementary and middle school students participate in a 1-mile dash while others compete in a 5K or 10K foot race.

=== Trail system ===
The Tri-Cities is linked by a system of 67 miles (108 km) of paved pedestrian and bike trails that run through the various cities and along the rivers. The 23-mile (37 km) Sacagawea Heritage Trail forms a loop that crosses two bridges and runs along the Columbia River through both Kennewick and Pasco. Sacagawea Heritage Trail also connects with the Richland Riverfront Trail, a marked hiking trail that focuses on the state of Washington's contribution to the nuclear history of the United States.

=== Watersports ===
The confluence of the Snake, Yakima, and Columbia rivers provides ample opportunity for boating, fishing, and swimming. Free boat launches can be found throughout all of the cities.

=== Parks ===
The Tri-Cities is home to seven river-front parks and various other parks and playgrounds. Three skate parks are located in the area; two in Kennewick and one in Richland.

Highlands Grange Park is a Kennewick city owned Public Park between 14th and 19th streets off of Union in Kennewick. This park covers 26 acres (11 ha), serving the surrounding new and old communities of approximately 13,000 citizens.

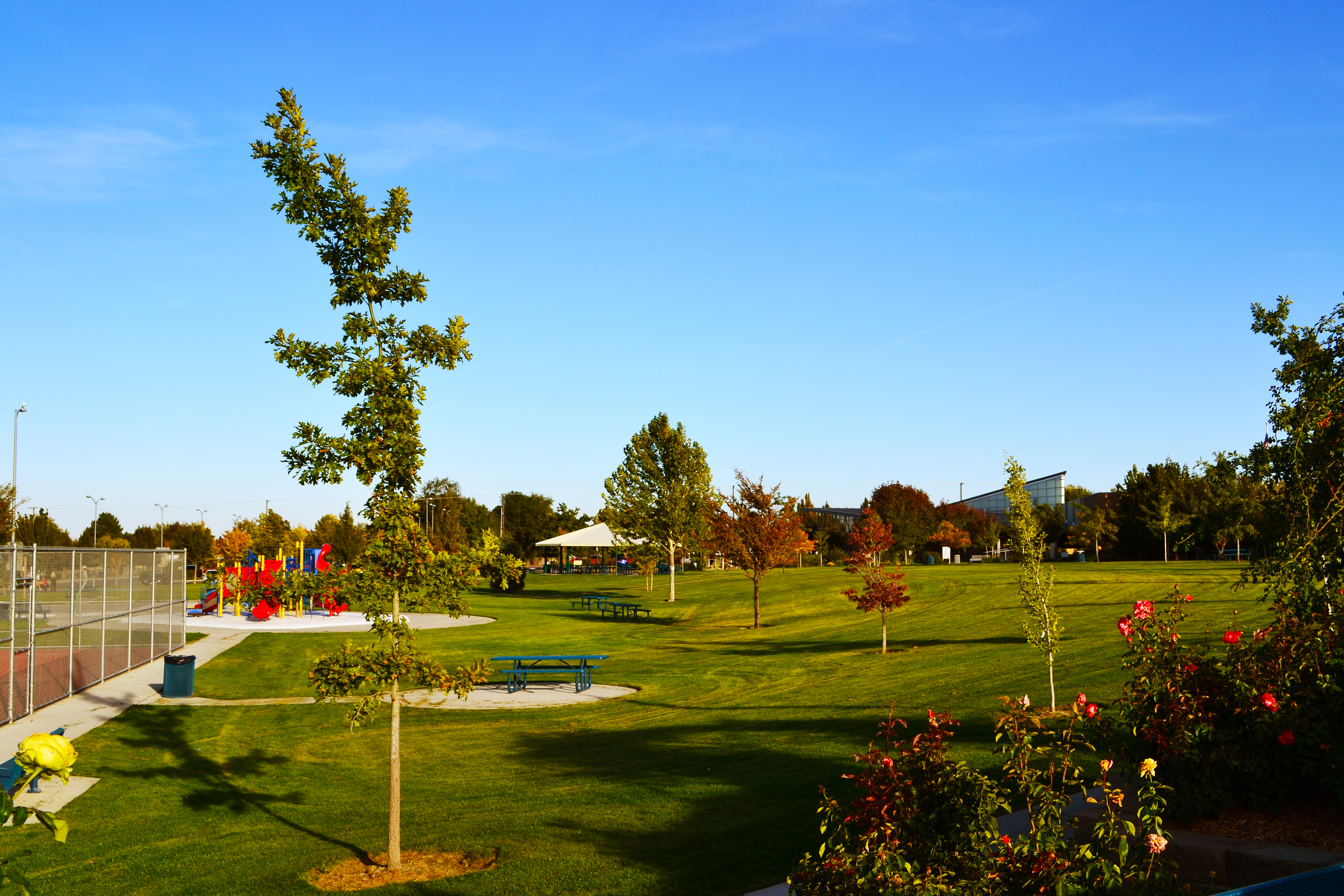
A view of Highlands Grange Park in October 2013

According to the City of Kennewick Comprehensive Parks and Recreation Plan 2013–2018, this park requires 6 acres (2.4 ha) of expansion due to the larger than expected community growth of the area. The Southridge Sports and Events Complex helps provide park service for the adjacent Grange neighborhoods.

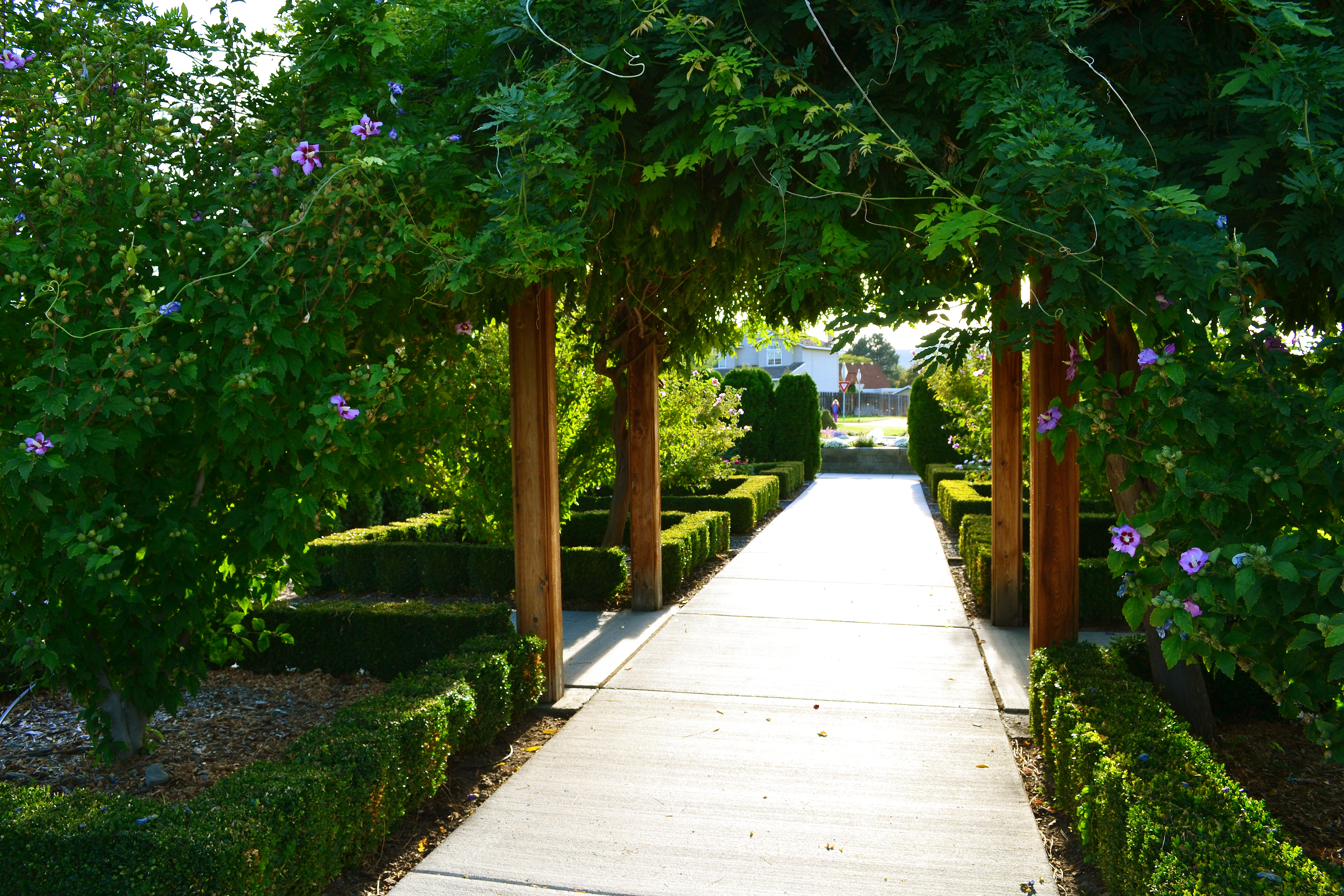
Part of the path in the Rose Garden portion of the Demonstration Garden in October 2013

This park features plenty of recreation, including a playground structure, basketball courts, a soccer/softball field, tennis courts, a roller hockey rink, a water feature, and 8/10-mile walk through a demonstration garden. Additionally, there are two picnic shelters for hosting public events and 79 parking spaces (not including the neighboring Kennewick branch of Mid-Columbia Libraries).

The park's most notable features include the demonstration garden and the water feature. The water feature provides summertime entertainment for local children inviting them to play amidst the colorful metal palm trees that shower water. The demonstration garden is Highland Grange Park's primary attraction and community draw, representing a visual festival of roses and other flowers tended to by master gardeners from Washington State University. This park is commonly used for public events, ranging from weddings in the demonstration garden to weekend BBQs under the picnic shelters. The park also touts the adjacent Highlands Grande building available for reservations and indoor events.

=== Skateboarding ===
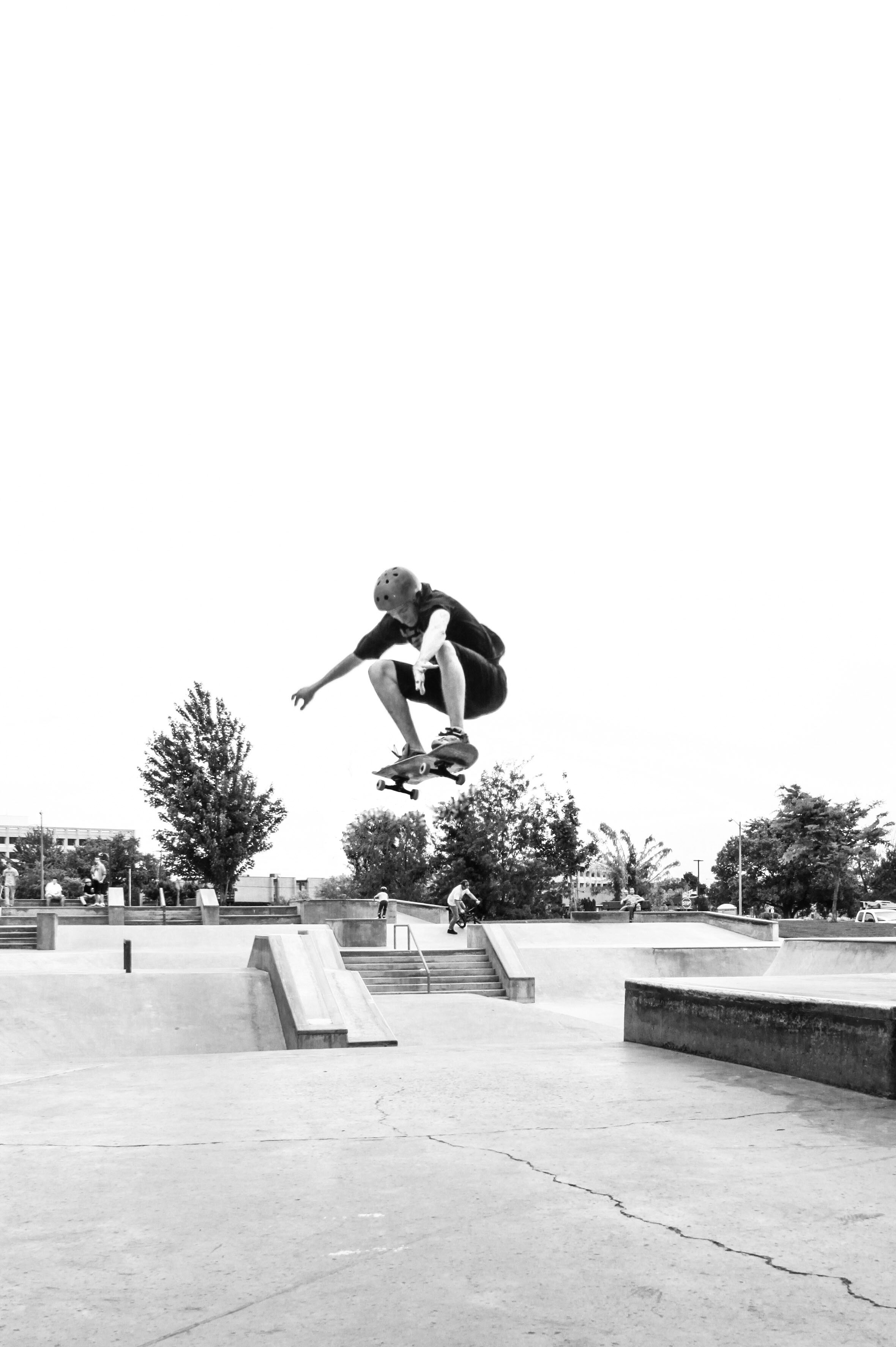
Jeanette Taylor skate-park

Tri-Cities has three skate parks: two in Kennewick and one situated in Richland. Jeanette Taylor Park is the number three ranked stated skate-park in Washington. Completed in 2005, this 22,100-square-foot (2,050 m^{2}) park features street elements, an 8-foot (2.4 m) bowl off of a snake run, and a half-pipe/bowl that is 10 feet (3.0 m) deep. The Jeanette Taylor skate park hosts a number of contests and events.

Richland Skatepark was designed by Wormhoudt Inc and built by Grindline Skateparks. This skatepark features a big bowl, medium bowl, flow section, mini ramp, ledges, rails and stairs.

=== Sports teams ===
The Tri-Cities is home to one minor league baseball team, the Tri-City Dust Devils of the Northwest League, and one major junior hockey club, the Tri-City Americans of the Western Hockey League.

The first of these teams to join the Tri-City area was the Tri-City Americans. The franchise relocated to the Tri-Cities initially as the New Westminster Bruins and later changed its name to the "Americans" in 1988. The Americans have advanced to the WHL finals one time in their tenure in the Tri-Cities, where they lost to the Calgary Hitmen 4–1 during the 2009–10 season. The Americans currently play at the Toyota Center in Kennewick, Washington.

The Tri-City Dust Devils are a High-A minor league baseball team that is an affiliate of the Los Angeles Angels. The Dust Devils came to the Tri-Cities in 2001, relocating from Portland as a member of the short-season Northwest League and changing the team's name from the Portland Rockies to the Tri-City Dust Devils. The Dust Devils took over as the primary tenants of Gesa Stadium, which previously housed the Tri-City Posse. The Dust Devils were Northwest League East Division Champions three times, in 2007, 2009 and 2011, all as a Colorado Rockies affiliate. In the 2021 Minor League Baseball realignment, the Dust Devils were elevated along with most of the former Northwest League to full-season High-A baseball under the new High-A West league name, and were assigned affiliation with the Angels. The league returned to its original name in 2022.

From 2005 to 2016, there was also professional indoor football team called the Tri-Cities Fever. The team came to the Tri-Cities in 2005 as an expansion team for the National Indoor Football League. Since then, the Fever switched to the AF2 in 2007, and then to the Indoor Football League in 2009. The Fever, housed in the Toyota Center in Kennewick, have won one division title and one league championship. The Fever won the Indoor Bowl in 2005 as a member of the NIFL, and in 2012 they were the Intense Division champions in the IFL where they ultimately lost the United Bowl Championship game to the Sioux Falls Storm. During the 2012 season, the Fever were awarded the 2012 IFL Franchise of the Year. In 2016, the Fever announced they would go dormant.

=== Retail ===
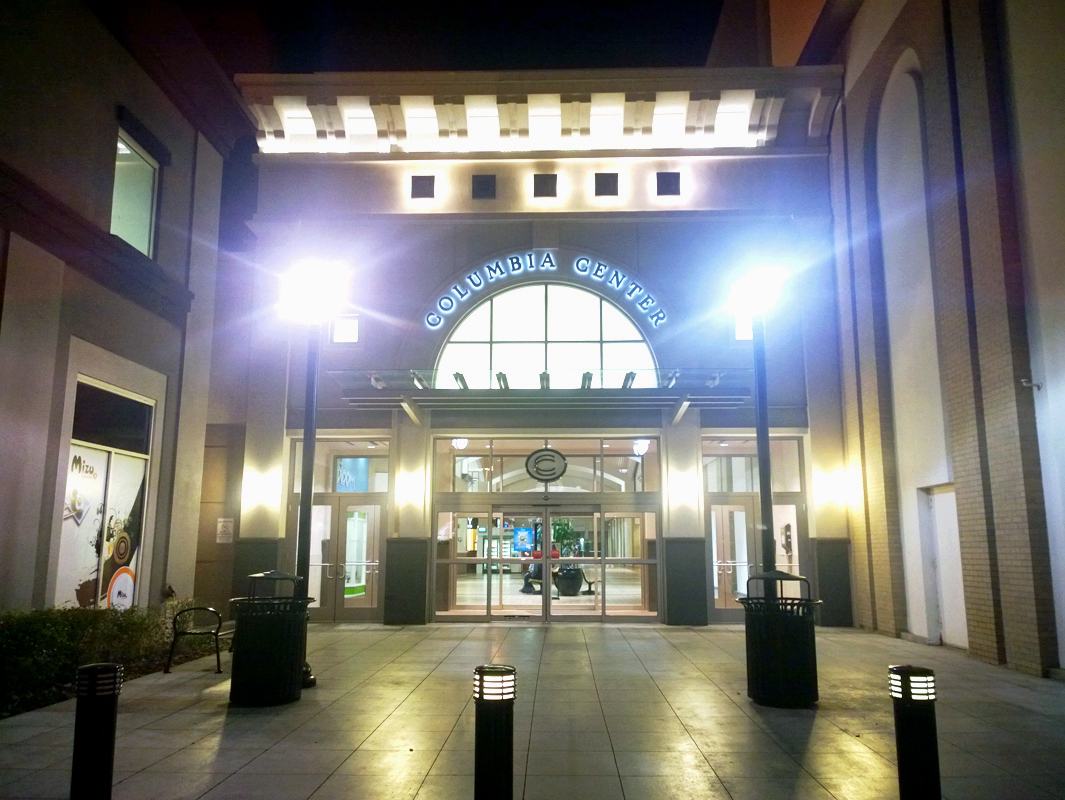
Columbia Center Mall Entrance

The Columbia Center Mall is a shopping center in Kennewick that is operated by Simon Property Group. This indoor shopping mall is the largest regional mall in Southeastern Washington.

=== Theater ===
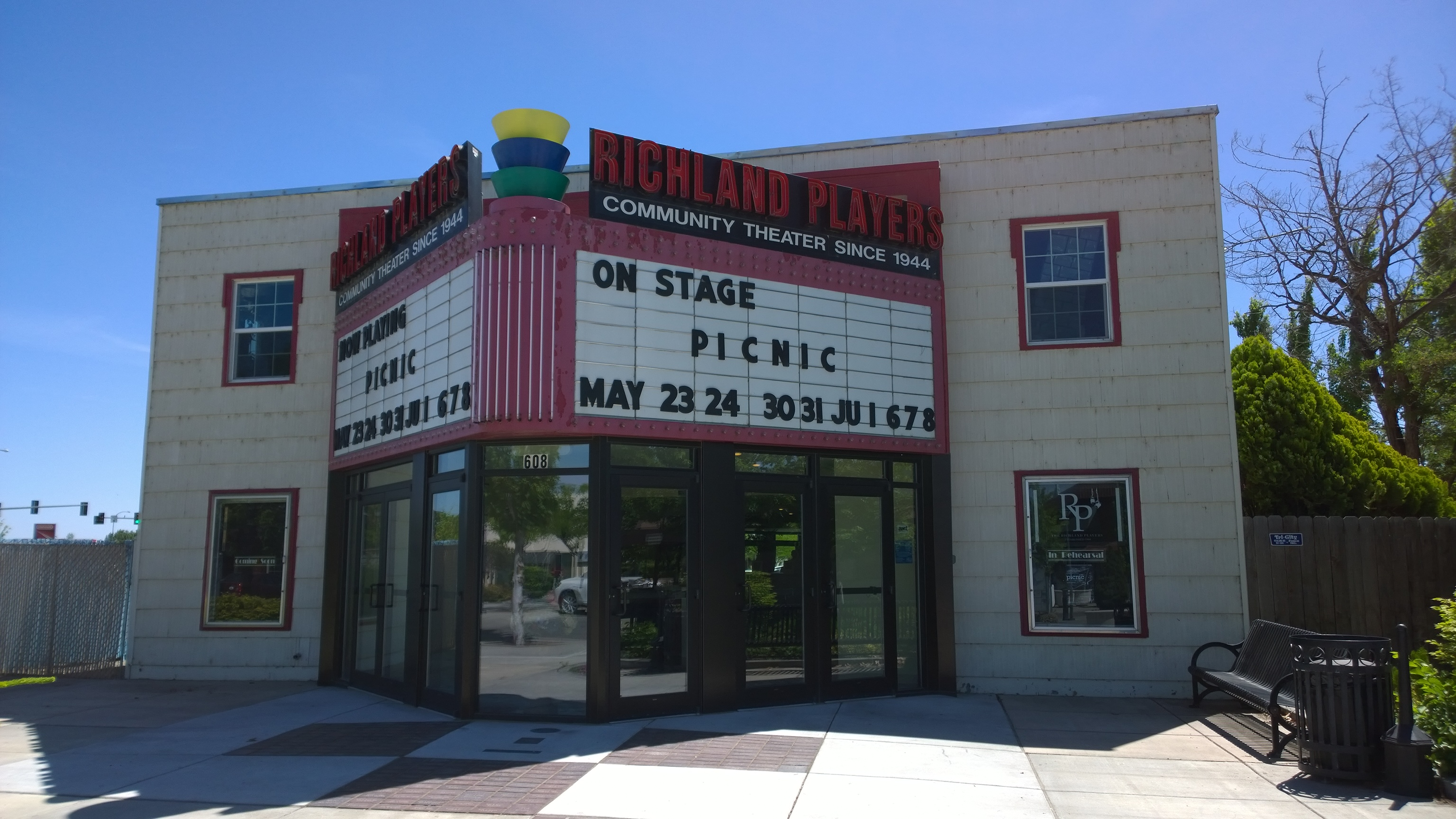
Richland Players Theater located in Richland

The Richland Players Theater has offered live performances annually for over 70 years. Originally known as The Village Players, the theater group was created in 1944 to bring music, comedy, and cultural opportunities to the local community. Today, the theater has more than 7,500 attendees annually attracting audiences from across the region such as Spokane, Yakima, and Walla Walla. The theater also serves the local community by bringing local retirees to shows and accommodating the visually and hearing impaired (with the participation of non-profit United Blind).

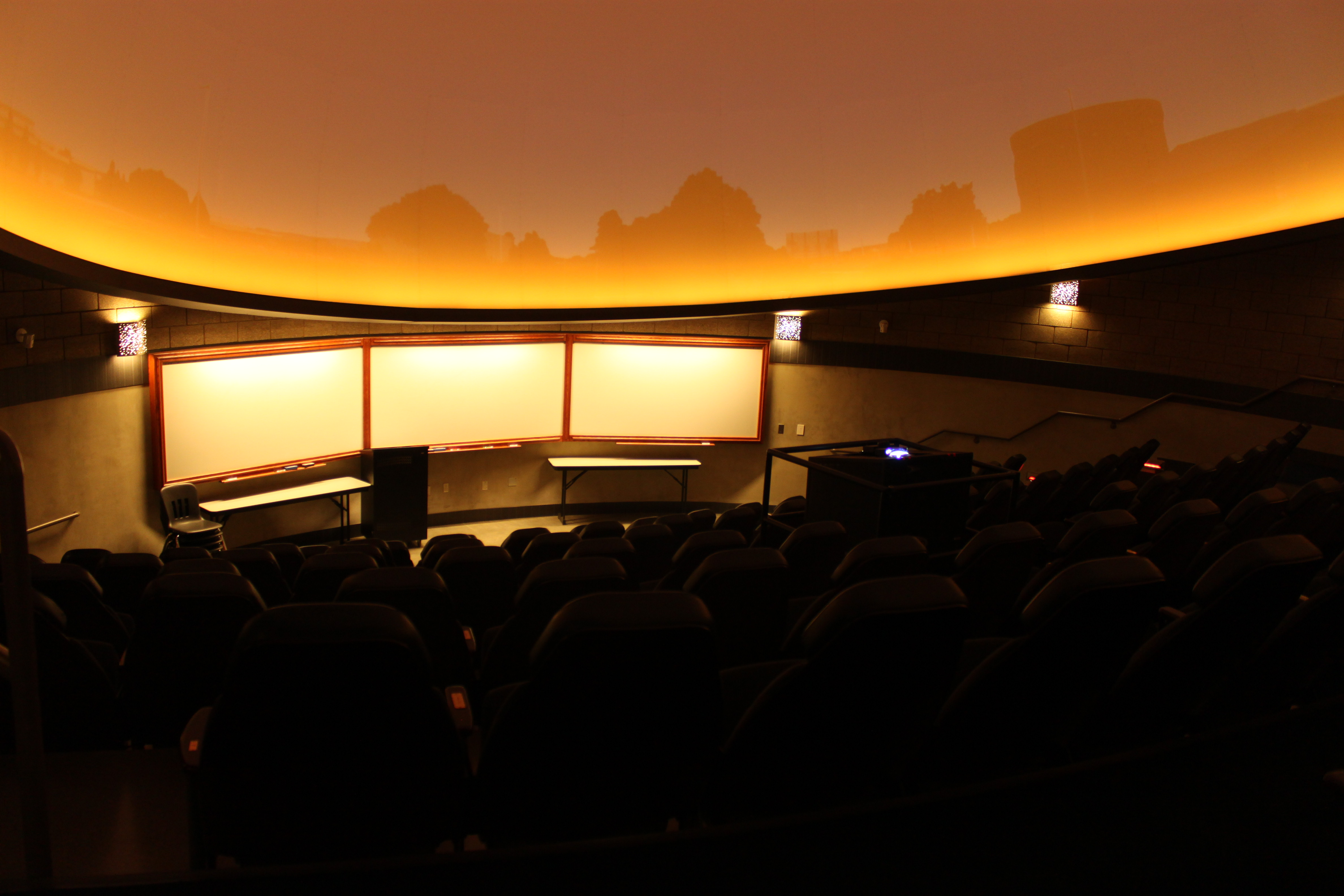
Interior of the CPCCo Planetarium, Pasco

The Bechtel National Planetarium is on the campus of Columbia Basin College in Pasco. The 36-foot (11 m) dome allows a 180° view overhead. Erin Steinert, Planetarium Outreach Specialist said, "It is the largest digital theater in the state of Washington; it seats the most people."

The Toyota Center opened its doors in 1988 and is a multi-purpose arena in Kennewick, Washington. The facility is available for touring broadway shows and concerts as well as conventions, special events, and trade shows.

== Events ==
Events in the Tri-Cities occur throughout the year and include:

- Cool Desert Nights – classic car show held in Richland in June. Attracts visitors from throughout the northwest.

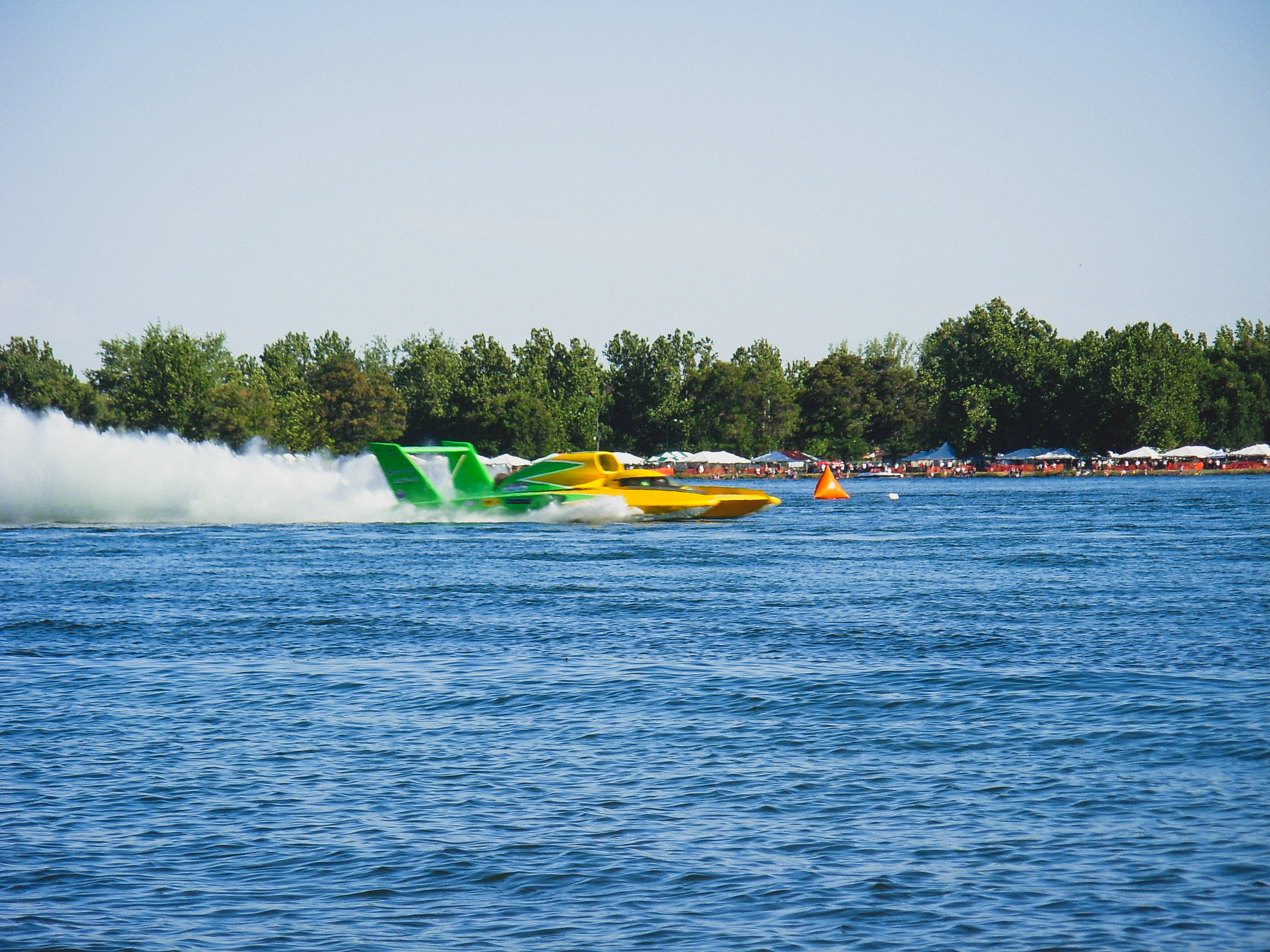
A boat racing in the HAPO Columbia Cup during the Tri-Cities Follies

- Tri-Cities Water Follies – annual unlimited hydroplane racing and air shows including the Columbia Cup, held on the Columbia River in July. In 2019, it marked its 54th year, bringing in over 7,000 tourists and $3 million in visitor spending to the area. The main event at the Tri-Cities Water Follies is the Apollo Columbia Cup, one of six Unlimited Hydroplane races in the American Power Boat circuit. Through a unique propulsion system, the boats skip along the water only briefly making contact at speeds up to 220 miles per hour (350 km/h). Visitors to the area have the option to venture into the pit and see the hydros up close.
- Allied Arts Show – annual art show held Richland's Howard Amon Park, in July.
- Benton/Franklin Fair – annual, regional fair held at Kennewick fairgrounds in late August.
- Hogs and Dogs – annual car and motorcycle rally in West Richland, one of the largest motorcycle rallies in the Northwest
- An annual renaissance fair is held along the Columbia river, at either Howard Amon Park in Richland or at Columbia Park in Kennewick. Ye Merrie Greenwood Faire features historically accurate costumes and Elizabethan English, as well as many vendors.
- Every November, Food Network Stars, World Class Wines, and local restaurants come together for Savor the Flavor, a 2-Day Bite and Sip event at the HAPO Center in Pasco. The event is produced by TASTE Tri-Cities magazine as a benefit for Modern Living Services.
- Radcon is a fan-run Science-Fiction / Fantasy convention held annually in Pasco. it is the second largest con of its kind in the Pacific Northwest. The staff is all-volunteer made up of sci-fi, fantasy and cos-play enthusiasts. The convention is held every year in February and is open to the general public.
- The city of Kennewick hosts several events year round at the Three Rivers Convention Center.
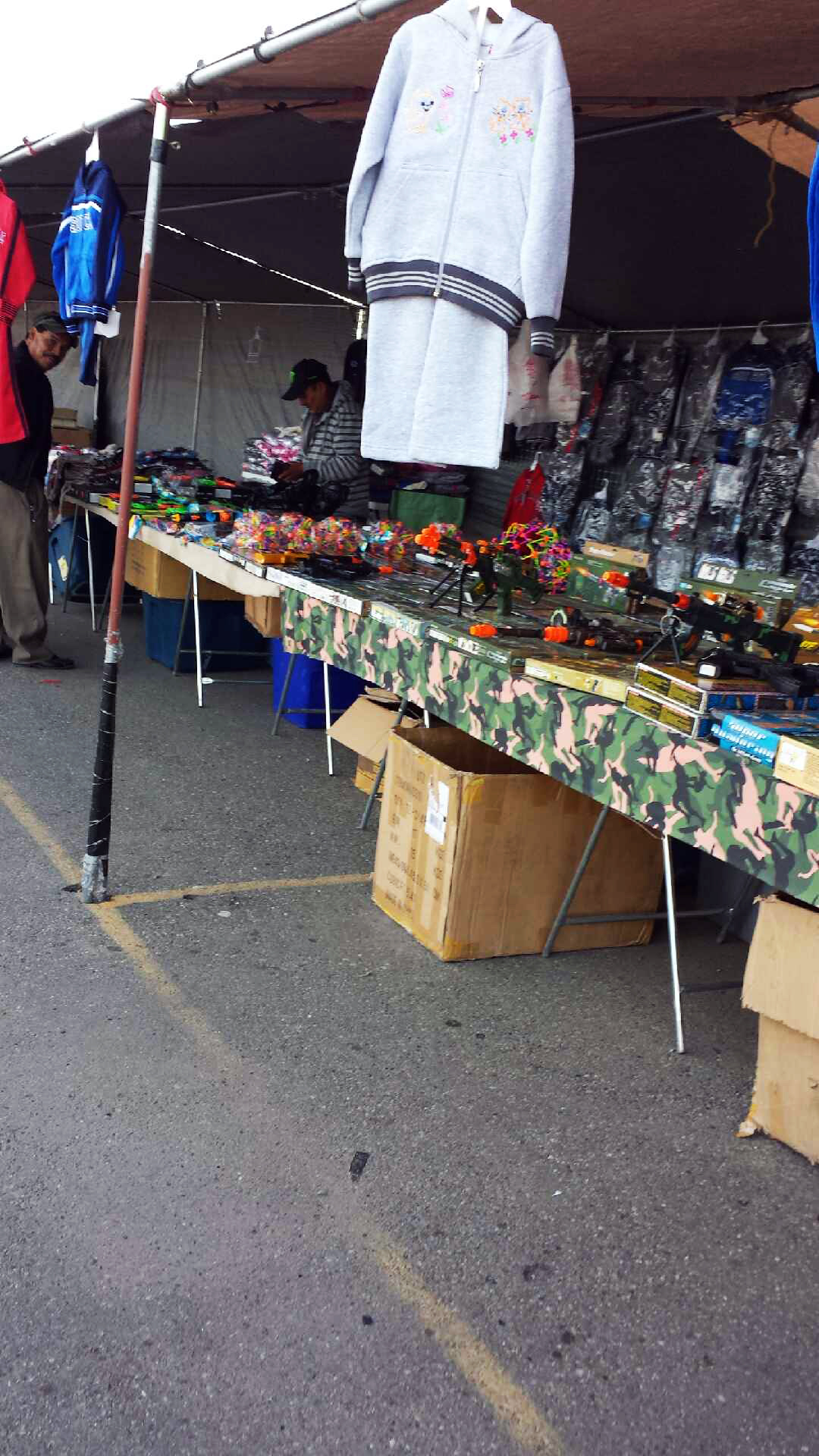
Flea market vendor
- Pasco Flea Market – The Pasco Flea Market is located on 200 East Lewis Place in Pasco, Washington. The market's season opens officially on March 1 and remains open publicly accessible until December 1, averaging about 350 different vendors. On a single Sunday, the market may see between 3000 and 5000 visitors.
- Fall Dog Show – Hosted by the Richland Kennel Club and usually held at Columbia Park in Kennewick during late September to early October

== Demographics ==
Historical combined population of Kennewick, Pasco, and Richland.

Historical population
Census	Pop.	Note	%±
1910	3,652		—
1920	5,325		45.8%
1930	5,223		−1.9%
1940	6,078		16.4%
1950	42,143		593.4%
1960	52,314		24.1%
1970	55,422		5.9%
1980	86,403		55.9%
1990	94,807		9.7%
2000	125,467		32.3%
2010	181,756		44.9%
2020	220,959		21.6%

The three adjoining cities if combined into one city would be the 100th largest by population and 73rd largest by area in the United States.

=== Kennewick ===
As of April 1, 2024, the population of Kennewick was estimated at 87,120 according to the Washington State Office of Financial Management, Forecasting Division.

As of the 2023 census, there were 85,155 people, 30,295 households, and 2.8 persons per household. The population density was 2,987.5 people per square mile (1,153.5 people/km^{2}). There were 32,495 housing units at an average density of 961.2 per square mile (371.1/km^{2}). The racial makeup of the city was 55% White, 2% Black or African American, 1% Native American, 2% Asian, <1% Pacific Islander, 2% from other races, and 3% from two or more races. 36% of the population was Hispanic or Latino of any race.

There were 30,295 households, out of which 37.6% had children under the age of 18 living with them, 51.5% were married couples living together, 12.2% had a female householder, and 31.8% were non-families. 26.1% of all households were made up of individuals, and 8.6% had someone living alone who was 65 years of age or older. The average household size was 2.6 and the average family size was 3.15.

In the city the population was spread out, with 29.6% under the age of 18, 10.3% from 18 to 24, 29.3% from 25 to 44, 20.6% from 45 to 64, and 10.2% who were 65 years of age or older. The median age was 32 years. For every 100 females, there were 98.3 males. For every 100 females age 18 and over, there were 94.3 males.

The median income for a household in the city was $41,213, and the median income for a family was $50,011. Males had a median income of $41,589 versus $26,022 for females. The per capita income for the city was $20,152. About 9.7% of families and 12.9% of the population were below the poverty line, including 18.8% of those under age 18 and 8.7% of those age 65 or over.

=== Pasco ===
As of April 1, 2021, the population of Pasco was estimated at 78,700, according to the Washington State Office of Financial Management, Forecasting Division.

As of the 2020 census, there were 77,108 people, and according to the 2000 census results, 9,619 households, and 7,262 families residing in the city. The population density was 1,141.9 people per square mile (440.9 people/km^{2}). There were 10,341 housing units at an average density of 368.2 per square mile (142.2/km^{2}). The racial makeup of the city was 52.76% White, 3.22% African American, 0.77% Native American, 1.77% Asian, 0.14% Pacific Islander, 37.44% from other races, and 3.9% from two or more races. Hispanic or Latino of any race was 56.26% of the population.

There were 9,619 households, out of which 45.6% had children under the age of 18 living with them, 54.7% were married couples living together, 14.3% had a female householder, and 24.5% were non-families. 20.1% of all households were made up of individuals, and 8.5% had someone living alone who was 65 years of age or older. The average household size was 3.30 and the average family size was 3.79.

In the city the population was spread out, with 35.5% under the age of 18, 11.8% from 18 to 24, 28.5% from 25 to 44, 15.5% from 45 to 64, and 8.7% who were 65 years of age or older. The median age was 27 years. For every 100 females, there were 106.7 males. For every 100 females age 18 and over, there were 104.2 males.

The median income for a household in the city was $34,540, and the median income for a family was $37,342. Males had a median income of $29,016 versus $22,186 for females. The per capita income for the city was $13,404. About 19.5% of families and 23.3% of the population were below the poverty line, including 31.4% of those under age 18 and 9.6% of those age 65 or over.

=== Richland ===
As of April 1, 2021, the population of Richland was estimated at 61,320, according to the Washington State Office of Financial Management, Forecasting Division.

As of the 2020 census, there were 60,560 people, and according to the 2000 census, 15,549 households, and 10,682 families residing in the city. The population density was 1,111.8 people per square mile (429.3 people/km^{2}). There were 16,458 housing units at an average density of 472.7 per square mile (182.5/km^{2}). The racial makeup of the city was 89.55% White, 1.37% African American, 0.76% Native American, 4.06% Asian, 0.11% Pacific Islander, 1.85% from other races, and 2.31% from two or more races. Hispanic or Latino of any race was 4.72% of the population.

There were 15,549 households, out of which 34.1% had children under the age of 18 living with them, 56% were married couples living together, 9.3% had a female householder, and 31.3% were non-families. 27.2% of all households were made up of individuals, and 9.4% had someone living alone who was 65 years of age or older. The average household size was 2.48 and the average family size was 3.02.

In the city the population was spread out, with 27.2% under the age of 18, 7.5% from 18 to 24, 27.1% from 25 to 44, 25.4% from 45 to 64, and 12.8% who were 65 years of age or older. The median age was 38 years. For every 100 females, there were 96 males. For every 100 females age 18 and over, there were 93.2 males.

The median income for a household in the city was $53,092, and the median income for a family was $61,482. Males had a median income of $52,648 versus $30,472 for females. The per capita income for the city was $25,494. About 5.7% of families and 8.2% of the population were below the poverty line, including 10.8% of those under age 18 and 5.6% of those age 65 or over.

Based on per capita income, one of the more reliable measures of affluence, Richland ranks 83rd of 522 areas ranked in the state of Washington—the highest rank achieved in Benton County.

== Media ==
=== Print media ===
The Tri-City Herald is a daily newspaper based in Kennewick which serves the Tri-Cities area. Printed in both Spanish and English, tú Decides is a free newspaper which was launched in early 2007. The Tri-Cities Area Journal of Business covers business news in Richland, Kennewick and Pasco.

=== Television ===
The Tri-Cities is part of the Yakima television market which, as of the 2017 Nielsen DMA Rankings, was recorded as having 230,950 TV households. Stations and networks which serve this market include KFFX-TV (a Fox affiliate), KVVK (a Univision affiliate), KEPR (a CBS affiliate), KNDU (NBC), KTNW (PBS), and KVEW (ABC). All except KFFX and KTNW are satellites of Yakima stations. KFFX is a full-fledged station, while KTNW repeats KWSU-TV in Pullman

=== Radio ===
According to the Spring 2018 Nielsen Audio Quarterly Report, the top 10 radio stations (AM and FM) with the highest listenership in Tri-Cities, Washington included KEGX-FM (classic rock; 5.6% share), KORD-FM (country; 5.6%), KUJ-FM (chart; 5.6%), KIOK-FM (country; 5.2%), KXRX-FM (classic rock; 5.2%), KFLD-AM (news; 4.3%), KEYW-FM (adult contemporary; 3.9%), KOLW-FM (chart; 2.6%), KJOX-AM (sports; 1.7%), KALE-AM (adult contemporary; 1.3%).

== Proposed consolidation and naming ==
Over the years, a number of proposals have been made to consolidate the cities into a united incorporated area. The idea behind this movement, which would make the resulting incorporated area the fourth largest city in the state, is that one larger city would create the presence needed to draw increased attention and focus to the region. Several motions to consolidate have not been passed.

Proposed names for such a consolidated area have included the "Quad-Cities" (accounting for West Richland), "Tri-Cities", or "Three Rivers". West Richland has separately been proposed to be renamed to "Red Mountain", in an attempt to distinguish itself from Richland.

== Notable people ==
=== Arts and literature ===
- Patricia Briggs, urban fantasy author
- Orson Scott Card, science fiction writer
- Chuck Palahniuk, novelist (author of Fight Club)
- Joseph Santos, artist and painter
- Ron Silliman, poet (born in Pasco, resident of Kennewick 1946–47)
- Rick Johnson (writer), nonfiction author (born in Richland)

=== Business and science and other ===
- James Albaugh – executive vice president, The Boeing Company
- Stephanie Dorgan – lawyer and entrepreneur, founder of The Crocodile nightclub
- Jim Mattis – 26th United States Secretary of Defense
- John Archibald Wheeler – theoretical physicist, collaborator with Albert Einstein
- Kayla Barron – NASA astronaut
- Don Watts – entrepreneur, philanthropist, and former CEO of Watts Brothers Farms, acquired by Conagra Foods

=== Entertainers and musicians ===
- Terence Knox, actor – Tour of Duty, St. Elsewhere
- James Otto, country singer and songwriter
- James Wong Howe, Academy Award-winning cinematographer
- Kevin T. O'Connor, musician, Talkdemonic
- Kristine W, (Weitz) singer and songwriter, former Miss Washington
- Larry Coryell – jazz guitarist, RHS class of 1961
- Nate Mendel – Foo Fighters bassist
- Santino Fontana, stage actor, director, and composer
- Sharon Tate – actress, victim of the Manson Family murders
- Michael Peterson, country singer and songwriter

=== Sports ===
- Adam Carriker – Washington Redskins
- Brian Urlacher – Chicago Bears Pro Bowl linebacker
- Bruce Kison – Pittsburgh Pirates World Series pitcher
- Damon Lusk – NASCAR driver
- Gene Conley – Major League Basketball and Baseball player, RHS
- Hope Solo – United States women's national soccer team goalkeeper
- Jason Repko – Minnesota Twins outfielder
- Jeremy Bonderman – Seattle Mariners All-Star pitcher
- Kimo von Oelhoffen – former Defensive Tackle for the Pittsburgh Steelers
- Michael Jackson – Seattle Seahawks linebacker
- Ray Mansfield – National Football League player, center, Pittsburgh Steelers
- Ray Washburn – former Major League Baseball pitcher
- Travis Buck – Oakland Athletics outfielder
- Tyler Brayton – Carolina Panthers
- Chad Ward – NFL offensive lineman
- Shawn O'Malley – Major League Baseball player
- Greg Olson – Oakland Raiders offensive coordinator
