= KJOX =

KJOX may refer to:

- KJOX (AM), a radio station (1340 AM) licensed to serve Kennewick, Washington, United States
- KTCR (AM), a radio station (1390 AM) licensed to serve Yakima, Washington, which held the call sign KJOX from 2004 to 2012
- KLMY, a radio station (99.7 FM) licensed to serve Long Beach, Washington, which held the call sign KJOX-FM from January 2009 to February 2010
