= KIOK =

Radio station in Richland, Washington

- Richland, Washington; United States
- Broadcast area: Tri-Cities, Washington
- Frequency: 94.9 MHz
- Branding: 94.9 the Wolf

Programming
- Format: Country

Ownership
- Owner: Stephens Media Group; (SMG - Tri-Cities, LLC)
- Sister stations: KALE, KJOX, KUJ-FM, KEGX, KKSR

History
- First air date: 1978
- Call sign meaning: K I OK-95 (former format)

Technical information
- Licensing authority: FCC
- Facility ID: 12455
- Class: C
- ERP: 100,000 watts
- HAAT: 381 meters
- Transmitter coordinates: 46°5′47.00″N 119°11′36.00″W
- Translators: 94.3 K232CB (Pendleton, Oregon)

Links
- Public license information: Public file; LMS
- Webcast: Listen Live
- Website: 949thewolf.com

KIOK (94.9 FM) is a radio station also known as "94.9 The Wolf" and broadcasts a country music format. Licensed to Richland, Washington, United States, the station serves the Tri-Cities, Washington area. The station is currently owned by Stephens Media Group.

KIOK is simulcast on FM translator K232CB 94.3 MHz at Pendleton, Oregon.

In 1978 when KIOK signed on the air with an Album Oriented Rock format the studios were located at 310 W. Kennewick Ave. At that time the station was owned by Sterling Recreation Organization, (SRO), who also owned Seattle's KZOK-FM. The Kennewick avenue location was the former site of the historic Benton Theatre which, at the time, was also owned by Sterling Recreation Organization. KIOK became a contemporary hit music station known as “OK 95” in the 1980s until 1996, when it changed to “Thunder Country 94.9” under new ownership. KIOK currently broadcasts from 4304 W. 24th in Kennewick, Washington, and is known as "94-9 The Wolf".

KIOK was one of 14 licenses transferred from the James Instad family to Stephens Media Group in a deal that was announced in April 2018.
