= Jump Off Joe (Washington) =

Butte in Benton County, Washington

Jump off Joe
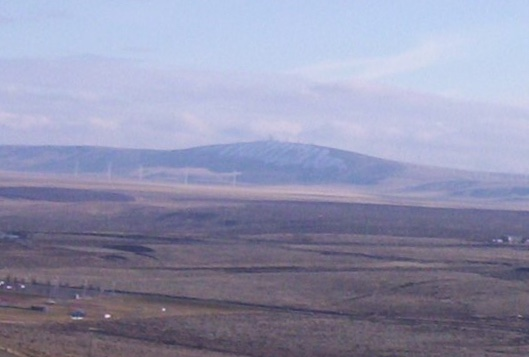
- Jump off Joe from Thompson Hill in Kennewick.

Highest point
- Elevation: 2,203 ft (671 m) NAVD 88
- Prominence: 720 ft (220 m)
- Isolation: 27.61 mi (44.43 km)
- Coordinates: 46°06′14″N 119°07′48″W

Geography
- Location within Washington (state)
- Location: Benton County, Washington, U.S.
- Parent range: Horse Heaven Hills
- Topo map: USGS Johnson Butte

Climbing
- Easiest route: Drive

Jump off Joe is a butte in the Horse Heaven Hills south of Kennewick in the U.S. state of Washington. Jump off Joe rises above the Tri-Cities and is visible throughout much of the region, including in parts of Umatilla and Morrow Counties in Oregon to the south. A gravel road approaches the summit from the south up a steep incline. On a clear day, visitors to the summit can see Mount Hood, Mount Adams and Mount Rainier.

Jump off Joe's high elevation compared to the surrounding area makes it an ideal location to place towers for radio and television communications. Among these is an amateur radio repeater that provides coverage to much of the Columbia Basin. Two major local television stations, NBC affiliate KNDU and ABC affiliate KVEW have their towers atop the butte. FM radio stations with transmitters on top of the butte include KUJ-FM and KORD-FM.

== Geology ==
Jump off Joe and the greater Horse Heaven Hills are anticlines within the Yakima Fold Belt. The belt is a series of fault lines extending throughout south-central Washington which are part of the larger Olympic–Wallowa Lineament. The lineament runs from Port Angeles to the Wallowa Mountains in northeastern Oregon.

Rocks in the area are predominantly basalt, part of the Columbia River Basalt Group. Lava flows believed to have originated from the Yellowstone hotspot approximately 10 to 15 million years ago when the hotspot was located in western Idaho. These lava flows covered large portions of Washington and Oregon all the way to the Pacific Ocean in basalt up to 5,900 feet (1,800 m) thick.

During the Last Glacial Maximum, ice sheets extended into what is today the Idaho Panhandle, blocking the flow of the Clark Fork River creating Glacial Lake Missoula. Over a period of 2,000 years the weight of the water behind this ice dam caused it to break sending a surge of water toward the Pacific Ocean. This water would back up at the Horse Heaven Hills, flowing through and deepening Wallula Gap located a few miles southeast.

== Climate and ecology ==
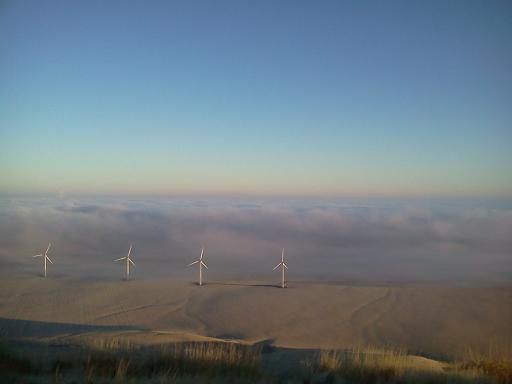
Inversion and wind turbines as viewed from the top of Jump off Joe.

Jump off Joe lies in a semi-arid environment within the rain shadow of the Cascade Mountains. Being nearly 2,000 feet (610 m) above the Columbia River, Jump off Joe receives more snow than the Tri-Cities and can remain snow covered for much of the winter season. High winds in the area provide an excellent setting for wind turbines to generate power. Like most of the Mid Columbia, the butte is treeless. Plant life includes native grasses and sagebrush.

Annual rainfall at the nearest airport, the Tri-Cities Airport in Pasco is 7.94 inches (20.2 cm). Afternoon temperatures in the summer can exceed 100 °F (38 °C). Jump off Joe frequently lies above inversions that form in the Columbia Basin during high pressure systems in the winter months.

== See also ==
- Badger Mountain (Benton County, Washington)
- Wallula Gap
- Rattlesnake Mountain (Benton County, Washington)
