= KEGX =

Radio station in Richland, Washington

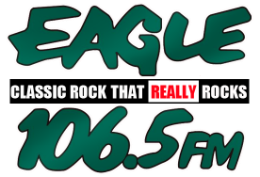
- Richland, Washington; United States
- Broadcast area: Tri-Cities, Washington
- Frequency: 106.5 MHz
- Branding: Eagle 106.5

Programming
- Format: Classic rock

Ownership
- Owner: Stephens Media Group; (SMG - Tri-Cities, LLC)
- Sister stations: KALE; KJOX; KIOK; KKSR; KUJ-FM

History
- First air date: 1978 (as KXDD)
- Former call signs: KXDD (1976–1982); KHWK (1982–1987); KOTY-FM (1987–1993)
- Call sign meaning: "Eagle"

Technical information
- Licensing authority: FCC
- Facility ID: 53140
- Class: C0
- ERP: 100,000 watts
- HAAT: 424.4 meters (1,392 ft)
- Transmitter coordinates: 46°5′57.5″N 119°7′44″W

Links
- Public license information: Public file; LMS
- Webcast: Listen live
- Website: www.eagle1065.com

KEGX (106.5 FM) is a radio station broadcasting a classic rock format. Licensed to Richland, Washington, United States, the station serves the Tri-Cities area. KEGX is owned by Stephens Media Group.

== History ==
The station was first licensed on February 28, 1978, as KXDD. It changed its call sign to KHWK on May 3, 1982; to KOTY-FM on April 3, 1987; and to KEGX on April 15, 1993.

As KHWK the station primarily had a country format. A noteworthy short lived incarnation was an attempt to operate a contemporary hit radio format and directly compete with KIOK.

As KOTY-FM it operated with a country format up until 1993 becoming KEGX "Eagle 106.5".

KEGX owners New Northwest Broadcasters in 2010 defaulted and its stations went into receivership. KEGX (and the other stations) continued to operate in that arrangement until Townsquare Media announced purchase of the frequency on December 1, 2010. In July 2011, the Federal Communications Commission (FCC) blocked Townsquare's acquisition of the former New Northwest operation in Kennewick, including KEGX.

On November 6, 2011, the Tri-City Herald reported that a radio owner in Fargo, North Dakota, was paying more than $6 million to purchase 12 stations in the Tri-Cities and Yakima from New Northwest Broadcasters. Ingstad Radio Washington agreed to purchase — at a discount — more than $16 million in debt owed by New Northwest from a creditor, CIT Group. The discounted price for Ingstad is about $6.7 million for all 12 stations. Ingstad acquired the stations in early 2012. In 2018, KEGX became part of Stephens Media Group.
