= KUJ-FM =

Radio station in Burbank (Tri-Cities), Washington

- Burbank, Washington; United States
- Broadcast area: Tri-Cities, Washington
- Frequency: 99.1 MHz
- Branding: Power 99.1

Programming
- Format: Contemporary hits
- Affiliations: Premiere Networks

Ownership
- Owner: Stephens Media Group; (SMG - Tri-Cities, LLC)
- Sister stations: KALE, KJOX, KIOK, KEGX, KKSR

History
- First air date: 1996
- Call sign meaning: Carried over from KUJ

Technical information
- Licensing authority: FCC
- Facility ID: 77777
- Class: C1
- ERP: 52,000 watts
- HAAT: 385 meters (1,263 ft)
- Transmitter coordinates: 46°5′58″N 119°7′40″W

Links
- Public license information: Public file; LMS
- Webcast: Listen live
- Website: power991fm.com

KUJ-FM (99.1 FM) is a commercial radio station licensed to Burbank, Washington, United States, and serving the Tri-Cities area. It is owned by Stephens Media Group, with studios on West 24th Avenue in Kennewick. The station airs a contemporary hit format.

KUJ-FM's transmitter is sited atop Jump Off Joe, a butte in Highland, Washington.

== History ==
KUJ-FM signed on the air in 1996. It began with a rhythmic adult contemporary format. It originally was the sister station to KUJ 1420 AM. The two stations still share call letters but are no longer co-owned.

In 1999, under the direction of Program Director Dave Hilton, KUJ-FM shifted from Rhythmic to Mainstream CHR, thus garnering the station its highest 18-34 ratings ever. Unable to sell the station's high ratings, New Northwest Broadcasters, under the direction of Scotty Brink and Jeff Jacobs, shifted KUJ-FM back in a rhythmic direction in the Spring of 2002.

KUJ-FM returned to Mainstream CHR in March 2007. It competes with 105.3 KONA-FM in Kennewick, Washington, for Top 40 listeners.

== See also ==
- List of three-letter broadcast call signs in the United States
