= KALE =

Radio station in Richland, Washington

- Richland, Washington; United States
- Broadcast area: Tri-Cities
- Frequency: 960 kHz
- Branding: 106.1 The Bridge

Programming
- Format: Contemporary Christian
- Affiliations: Westwood One

Ownership
- Owner: Stephens Media Group; (SMG - Tri-Cities, LLC)
- Sister stations: KJOX, KIOK, KUJ-FM, KEGX, KKSR

History
- First air date: 1950 (at 900)
- Former frequencies: 900 kHz (1950–1952)

Technical information
- Licensing authority: FCC
- Facility ID: 63359
- Class: B
- Power: 5,000 watts day; 1,000 watts night; FM Translator 250 watts vertical
- Transmitter coordinates: 46°14′33.5″N 119°10′45.1″W
- Translator: 106.1 K291BS (Richland)

Links
- Public license information: Public file; LMS
- Webcast: Listen Live
- Website: 1061thebridge.com

KALE (960 AM, "106.1 The Bridge") is a radio station licensed to Richland, Washington, United States, the station serves the Tri-Cities, Washington area. The station is owned by Stephens Media Group.

== History ==
KALE began broadcasting on April 1, 1950, with 1,000 watts of power on AM 900 kHz and was owned by Yakima Broadcasting Corp. KALE had a Top-40 radio format until the early 1980s when it switched to a more adult contemporary format. The station reached its zenith as an AM station during the early to mid-1970s. The station was consistently at or near the top of the age 18-to-49 ratings block (as well as among teens) and frequently led the market in sales billings. The news department won numerous regional and statewide Society of Professional Journalists awards. KALE's ratings dominance waned as listeners began migrating from AM to FM during the latter 1970s and early 1980s.

In the 1970s the station was owned by Sterling Recreation Organization and later was owned by Revitalization Partners, before New Northwest Broadcasters purchased the station. In December 2010, Townsquare Media announced it was acquiring 12 stations owned by New Northwest Broadcasters. Since they were already owners of 11 stations in the Yakima and Tri-city areas they planned to spin off 11 stations once the sale closed. Townsquare was planning to move some formats to new frequencies and some call signs were expected to change as well but in July, 2011, the FCC stopped Townsquare Media's plan to buy 12 Tri-City and Yakima radio outlets from New Northwest Broadcasters. According to the July 30, 2011, Tri-City Herald, "An eight-page letter from the FCC to Townsquare released on the agency's website Friday said that proposed use of a divestiture trust was a substantial departure from the kinds of uses previously approved by the commission and dismissed five sets of applications that would have reassigned the radio station licenses."

On November 6, 2011, the Tri-city Herald reported that a Fargo, N.D., radio owner was paying more than $6 million to purchase 12 stations in the Tri-Cities and Yakima currently owned by New Northwest Broadcasters. Ingstad Radio Washington agreed to purchase — at a discount — more than $16 million in debt owed by Seattle-based New Northwest Broadcasters from a creditor, CIT Group. The Tri-Cities stations included in the sale are: KUJ-FM, a Top-40 hits station; KIOK-FM, a country station; KEGX-FM, a classic rock station; KTCR, talk radio; KKSR-FM, a variety hits station; and KALE, a FOX Sports affiliate. The Yakima stations are: KXDD-FM, a country station; KRSE-FM, a variety hits station; KJOX, an ESPN affiliate; KARY-FM, an oldies station; KBBO, a news radio station and KHHK-FM, a contemporary hit music station. The discounted price for Ingstad is about $6.7 million for all 12 stations.

According to the Tri-City Herald on May 15, 2012, the station switched to a "Country Legends" classic country format with the sports programming being moved to sister station AM 1340.

KALE's broadcast studios were initially at the transmitter site at Road 68 in Pasco, Washington. The studios then moved to 218 W. Kennewick Ave., Kennewick, Washington. In 1978 the studios moved again to 310 W. Kennewick Ave. when KALE's FM station, KIOK, FM 94.9, was licensed and began broadcasting. The site at 310 W. Kennewick Ave. was the former site of the historic Benton Theatre which, at the time of the move, was also owned by Sterling Recreation Organization. After broadcasting from North Columbia Center Blvd. in Kennewick for several years, KALE moved to its current home at 4304 S. 24th Ave in Kennewick in 2012.

On February 24, 2016, KALE changed its format to adult contemporary, branded as "106.1 More FM" (also simulcast on FM translator K291BS 106.1 FM Richland, Washington).

On September 19, 2016, KALE changed its format from adult contemporary to classic hits, branded as "Classic Hits 106.1", swapping formats with KKSR 95.7 Walla Walla.

On December 26, 2017, after stunting with Christmas music through the holiday season, KALE rebranded as "Big 106.1".

On July 26, 2018, KALE flipped back to adult contemporary, branded again as "106.1 More FM" (with the format moving back from KKSR 95.7 FM Walla Walla, which switched to contemporary Christian). However, More FM's second tenure would be short-lived, as on October 31 of that year, KALE would begin stunting with Christmas music again as "Santa 106.1". While the station was expected to debut a new format after the holidays, the Brooke & Jubal morning show remained on the station. On December 26, 2018, KALE returned to its current adult contemporary format and "106.1 More FM" branding.

On June 17, 2022, KALE changed its format from adult contemporary to contemporary Christian, branded as "106.1 The Bridge".

== Previous logos ==
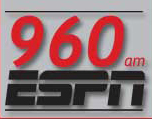
before the 106.1 Translator Signed On

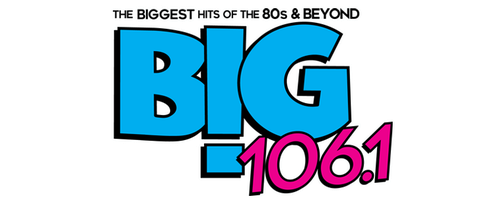
