= Columbia Center (Kennewick, Washington) =

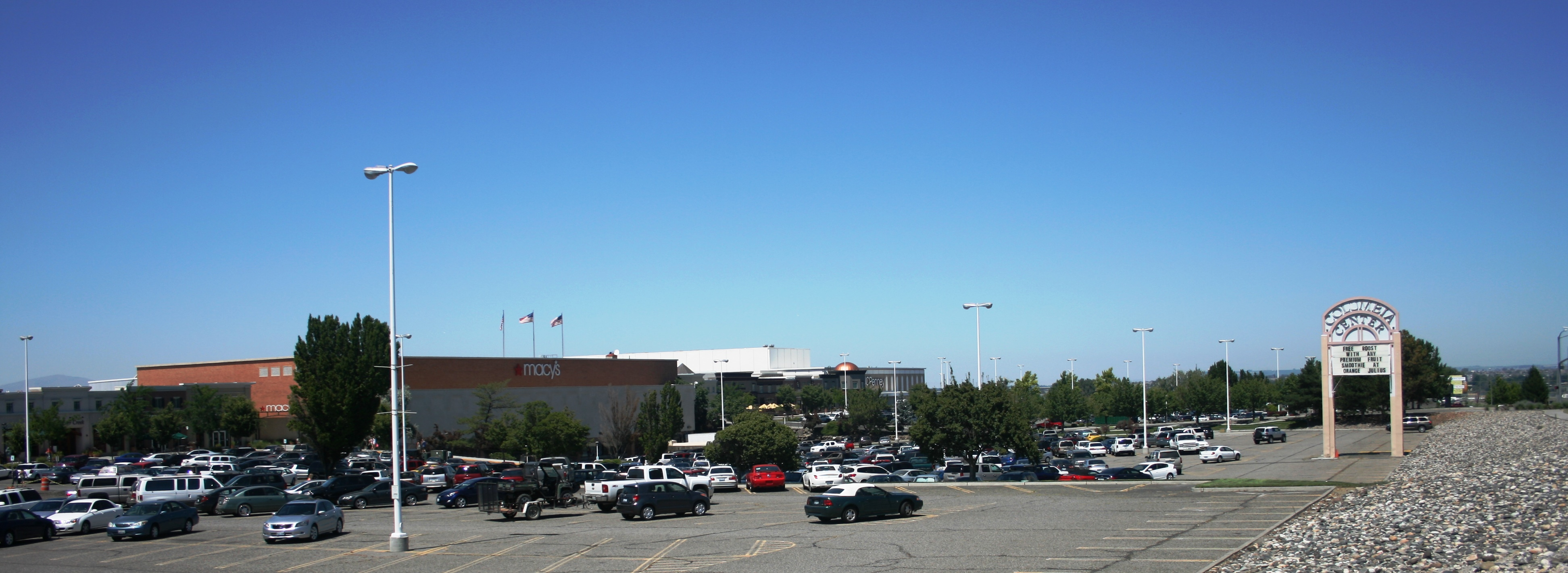
- Columbia Center in Kennewick, Washington
- Location: Kennewick, Washington, United States
- Coordinates: 46°13′33.77″N 119°13′37.44″W
- Opened: 1969
- Developer: Allied Stores
- Owner: Simon Property Group
- Num. of stores: 122
- Floor area: 795,305 sq ft (73,886.3 m^{2})
- Floors: 1 (2 in main Macy's and JCPenney)
- Website: www.simon.com/mall/columbia-center

Columbia Center is a shopping mall located in northwestern Kennewick, Washington, owned by Simon Property Group. It is the largest mall in southeastern Washington, with two Macy's stores (both formerly The Bon Marché) and JCPenney as its anchors. A Dave & Buster’s is planned to open at the mall. It opened in 1969, and has undergone two major renovations. In 1988, the expansion opened anchors Sears and Lamonts (later Gottschalks, The Bon Marché Men's and Children's, now Macy's Men's and Children's). The second in 1997 on the site of a former Pay 'n Save, brought Barnes & Noble, Old Navy, plus a renovated eight-screen Regal Cinemas (Columbia Center 8), which closed in July 2018, and was demolished for a Dick's Sporting Goods that opened in Fall 2019.

On December 28, 2018, it was announced that Sears would be closing as part of a plan to close 80 stores nationwide. The store closed in March 2019.

After Sears closed, JoAnn Fabrics, a fabric and craft retailer, remodeled the space and opened a store inside the former Sears. In 2023, JoAnn Fabrics relocated outside the mall and closed in 2025 due to bankruptcy. In 2026, Dave & Buster's announced that they would be opening one of their arcades and restaurants on the site of the former JoAnn Fabrics and Sears. Plans involve demolishing the existing building to build a new 29,000 square foot (2694.2 m²) building on site.
