= KJOX (AM) =

Radio station in Kennewick, Washington

- Kennewick, Washington; United States
- Broadcast area: Tri-Cities
- Frequency: 1340 kHz
- Branding: 1340 ESPN Tri-Cities

Programming
- Format: Sports
- Affiliations: ESPN Radio; Westwood One

Ownership
- Owner: Stephens Media Group; (SMG - Tri-Cities, LLC)
- Sister stations: KALE; KEGX; KIOK; KKSR; KUJ-FM

History
- First air date: August 19, 1945
- Former call signs: KPKW (1945–1962); KGRS (1962–1965); KSMK (1965–1973); KOTY (1973–1988); KTCR (1988–2012)

Technical information
- Licensing authority: FCC
- Facility ID: 53139
- Class: C
- Power: 1,000 watts day; 1,000 watts night
- Transmitter coordinates: 46°13′17.5″N 119°11′14″W

Links
- Public license information: Public file; LMS
- Website: www.1340espnradio.com

KJOX (1340 AM) is a radio station broadcasting a sports format. Located in Kennewick, Washington, United States, the station serves the Tri-Cities, Washington area. The station is owned by Stephens Media Group and features programming from ESPN Radio, Seattle Sports, and Westwood One.
