= Charter College (South Africa) =

Charter College International High School
- Honeydew, Gauteng; South Africa

Information
- Type: Private School, Cambridge Syllabus
- Motto: Ad Vitum Paramus (Preparing for Life)
- Established: 1 Jan 2008
- Principal: Mrs Alison Dodge
- Grades: 8 to 12
- Enrollment: ~160
- Website: www.chartercollege.co.za

Charter College International High School is a private, Cambridge high school situated in Johannesburg, South Africa. It was established in 2008.

== Subjects Offered ==
Charter College offers 13 subjects, in grade 8 and 9 students take all subjects however in Grade 10 students pick from the following: Accounting, Art, Biology, Chemistry, Physics, Design And Technology, History, Economics and Business. They can also take either Maths CORE or Extended as well mandatory English, Life Orientation and a second language.
