= Charter College (United States) =

Network of for-profit colleges in the United States

Coordinates: 61°11′47″N 149°50′21″W

Charter College is a network of private, for-profit colleges in the United States. It offers programs in healthcare, business, veterinary science, information technology, and select trade careers. Charter operates campuses in six states and offers certificates, associate, and bachelor's degrees. Fully online programs are available for select programs.

== History ==
Charter College was founded in 1985 (41 years ago) by Milton Byrd in Anchorage, Alaska. He was the former provost of Florida International University and President of Chicago State University. Byrd's goal was to provide students with skills employers were seeking, so the school's first classes focused on computer proficiency.

In 2005, Byrd retired and Prospect Education, LLC acquired Charter College. However, Byrd maintained the role of President Emeritus until his death in 2024.

In 2008, Santa Clarita College, which was also owned by Prospect Education, changed the names of all three of their campuses in California to become part of Charter College. The following year, Charter College continued to expand, bringing its career-focused education to Washington state. Today, Charter College has campus locations in Alaska, California, Washington, Nevada, New Mexico, and Utah.

In 2012, Charter College began offering several courses in an online format. Students were permitted to take up to 50% of their program's credit hours through online learning courses. By 2014, all programs included some online learning. Programs such as Certificate in Dental Assisting, Certificate in HVAC/R, Certificate in Medical Assistant, Certificate in Pharmacy Technician, Certificate in Veterinary Assistant, and Certificate in Welding transitioned to a blended-learning format that combined online learning with on-ground, hands-on-learning. Other programs, including all business and IT programs, moved to a fully online format.

In 2016, Charter Institute, a Division of Charter College was developed to bring the Charter education approach to New Mexico.

When the COVID Pandemic hit in 2020, Charter College was already positioned to move all instruction to an online format when government ordinances forced the temporary closure of campuses.

In March 2023, the Washington Student Achievement Council listed the college as "at risk" due to its financial status. The college was required to notify all incoming and existing students as well as present a closure plan to the state. The state of Alaska listed the school as financially unsound due to the company's financial status, in July 2023. The school was required to notify all incoming and existing students as well as present a closure plan to the state. In the 2022 fiscal year, the college reported a net operating loss of 5.2 million dollars with a negative cash flow of 6.6 million dollars, further depleting the cash reserves of the company. To mitigate these losses, in January 2023, the college made the difficult decision to execute a reduction in force, cutting roughly 10% of the administrative staff. Over a Special Commission meeting, Charter College and ACPE agreed on a surety bond amount. The college transferred the one million dollars to ACPE in October 2023 fulfilling all reporting requirements. The commission voted to remove Charter College from financially unsound status in April 2024. Effective July 23, 2024, the state of WA removed the at-risk designation from Charter College.

== Academics ==
Charter College has a combined 28 certificate, associate, and bachelor’s degree programs in business, healthcare, information technology, veterinary assistant, and skilled trades.

Charter College specializes in career-focused education utilizing hands-on, experiential training. Several certificate level programs, including the Certificate in Dental Assisting, Certificate in Medical Assistant, Certificate in Pharmacy Technician, and Certificate in Veterinary Assistant programs require the completion of a 5-week externship in a professional office or clinic environment as part of the graduation requirements. Some associate degree level programs like Diagnostic Medical Sonography, Radiologic Technology, Respiratory Therapy, and Nursing as well as advanced certificate programs in Computer Tomography and Magnetic Resonance Imaging require the completion of clinical practicums as part of the graduation requirements.

In 2022, Charter College began a partnership with C4L Academy to provide an opportunity for adult learners to pursue their high school diploma in conjunction with vocational training for a new career. Qualified candidates can enroll in a Charter College certificate program in healthcare, veterinary assistant, or skilled trades and enroll in the high school diploma program at the same time.

=== Accreditation ===
Charter College is institutionally accredited by the Accrediting Bureau of Health Education Schools to award bachelor of science degrees, associate of applied science degrees, and certificates. Available programs include both blended learning and full distance learning (online). Charter College participates in the National Council for State Authorization Reciprocity Agreements (NC-SARA) providing the opportunity to enroll in our fully online programs through Anchorage, AK.

Charter College also holds programmatic accreditation for the Associate of Applied Science in Nursing program from the Accrediting Commission for Education in Nursing.

Charter College is authorized by the following certifying boards:

- American Association of Medical Assistants
- Pharmacy Technician Certification Board
- The American Registry of Radiologic Technologists
- Commission on Accreditation for Respiratory Care
- American Dental Association

Additionally, Charter College is authorized by the following agencies:

- Alaska Department of Commerce Board of Nursing
- Alaska Commission on Postsecondary Education Authorization
- Alaska Board of Nursing
- Bureau for Private Postsecondary Education Licensure
- New Mexico Higher Education Department Approval
- State of Utah
- Washington State Department of Health
- Washington Student Achievement Council Authorization
- Workforce Training and Education Coordinating Board

=== Student Services ===
Charter College provides several student services to aid students in their journey.

Financial Aid Services are available to students to help navigate different financial aid sources including FAFSA and VA Education Benefits. According to the Integrated Postsecondary Education Data System, 92% of Charter College students receive some form of financial aid.

Student coaches are available to help students who may experience non-academic, personal, or financial problems during their enrollment at Charter College.

Faculty members are dedicated to student success and provide extra help outside of the classroom to students needing additional assistance with their studies.

Career Services are provided to both students and graduates. They include assistance with career portfolios, resumes and cover-letters, job search, mock interviews, and occupational resource materials. The school also conducts regular career fairs to connect employers with prospective employees.

== Locations ==
Charter College has 10 physical locations across six states in addition to an online campus:

- Alaska: Anchorage
- California: Canyon Country & Oxnard
- Nevada: Reno
- New Mexico: Farmington (Charter Institute)
- Utah: Salt Lake City
- Washington: Lacey, Pasco, Vancouver, & Yakima

Charter College’s corporate headquarters is in Reno, Nevada.

== Community Outreach ==
Charter College campuses host multiple community events throughout the year including Blood Drives, Food Drives, Career Fairs, and other local events.
