= Washington State Route 823 =

State highway in Yakima County, Washington, US

State Route 823
- SR 823 highlighted in red

Route information
- Auxiliary route of I-82
- Maintained by WSDOT
- Length: 5.56 mi (8.95 km)
- Existed: 1984–present

Major junctions
- South end: US 12 in Yakima
- I-82 / US 97 near Selah
- North end: SR 821 near Selah

Location
- Country: United States
- State: Washington
- County: Yakima

Highway system
- State highways in Washington; Interstate; US; State; Scenic; Pre-1964; 1964 renumbering; Former
← SR 821	→ SR 900

State Route 823 (SR 823) is a state highway in Yakima County, Washington, United States. It runs for 5.6 miles (9.0 km) from an interchange with U.S. Route 12 (US 12) and through the city of Selah to a junction with SR 821. A portion of the highway runs in the median of Interstate 82 (I-82), its parent route, as it crosses the Naches River.

SR 823 was established by the state government in 1984, running from I-82 to downtown Selah. It replaced earlier city and county roads built in the late 19th century and rebuilt several times in the early 20th century alongside an interurban railway. The north half of the route was built by the county in the 1970s and added to SR 823 in 1991. The section through downtown Selah was later rerouted onto a truck bypass built by the state in 2011, eliminating an extra turn in the route.

== Route description ==
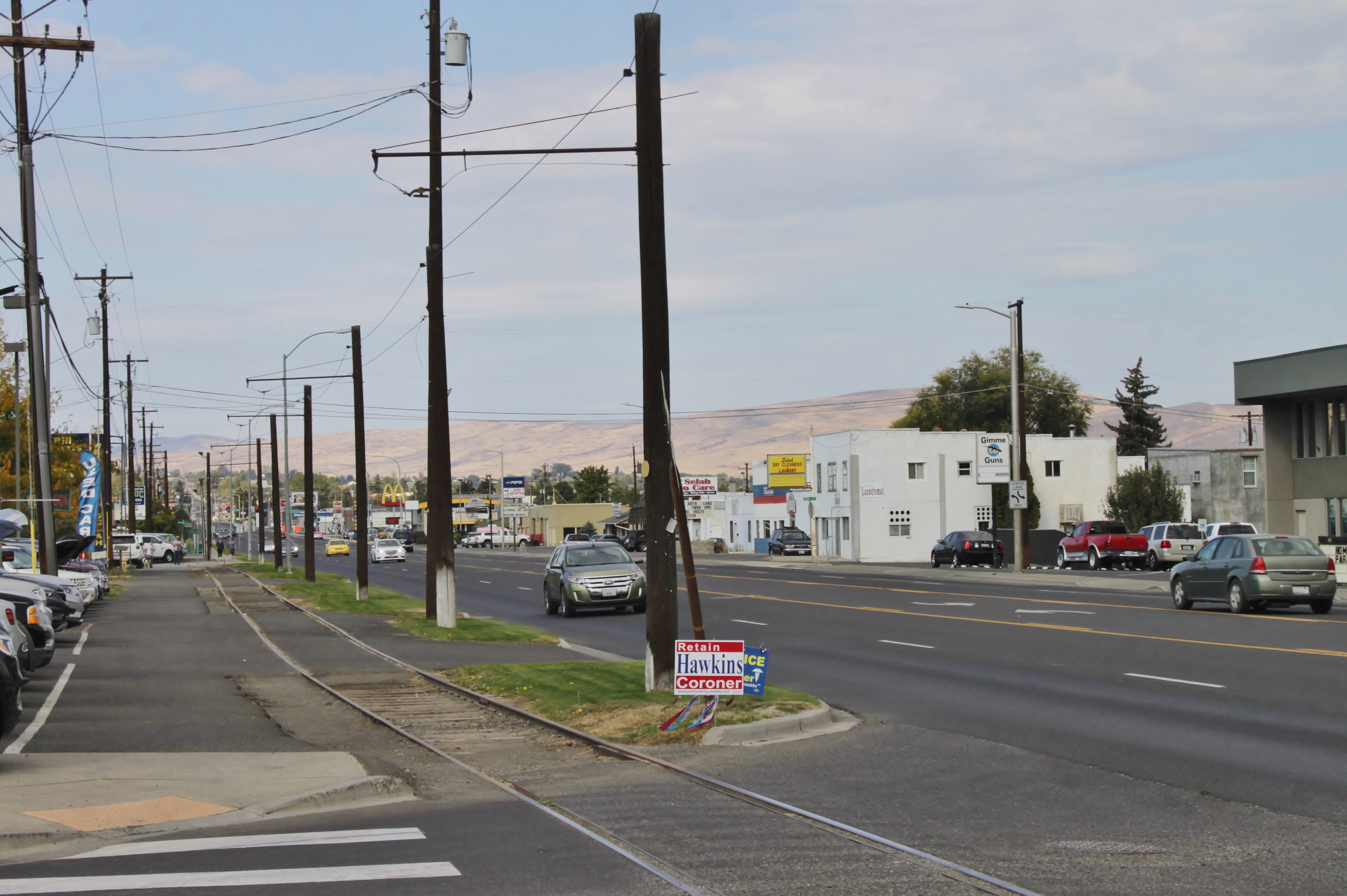
Looking northbound on SR 823 in Selah

SR 823 begins as a continuation of North 1st Street at an interchange with US 12 north of downtown Yakima. The two-lane highway runs northwest in the freeway median of I-82 and US 97 through the Selah Gap, crossing the Naches River and the Yakima River near the confluence of the rivers. On the north side of an interchange with Resthaven Road, which provides connections between the freeway and SR 823, the highway crosses over the eastbound lanes of I-82.

The highway crosses again over the Yakima River on a four-lane bridge that also includes a multi-use bicycle and pedestrian path on the west side. SR 823 intersects a road serving the River Ridge Golf Course and crosses over a section of the BNSF Railway's Yakima River Subdivision railroad before entering Selah as 1st Street. The street follows a section of the Yakima Valley Transportation Company's heritage streetcar route and passes through a commercial district with several warehouses. At Valleyview Avenue, SR 823 turns east and becomes Jim Clements Way, which turns north onto Wenas Avenue. After intersecting Naches Avenue, Wenas Avenue turns northeast and heads through a commercial and suburban area on the east edge of Carlon Park before leaving the city. SR 823 leaves Wenas Road near a group of warehouses and travels northeast along Harrison Road to a railroad overpass and another bridge across the Yakima River. To the east end of the bridge, the highway reaches its terminus at a junction with SR 821, which continues north into the Yakima River Canyon and southeast to an interchange with I-82 near the Yakima Training Center.

SR 823 is maintained by the Washington State Department of Transportation (WSDOT), which conducts an annual survey on the state's highways to measure traffic volume in terms of annual average daily traffic. The highway's 2016 traffic volumes ranged from a minimum of 4,500 vehicles at its northern terminus with SR 821 to a maximum of 31,000 vehicles between Yakima and Selah. SR 823 also has a high volume of freight traffic, carrying fruit from the greater Yakima Valley to processing plants in Selah, and is designated as a Strategic Freight Corridor by the state government. A section of SR 823 between US 12 in Yakima and Naches Avenue in downtown Selah is listed as part of the National Highway System, a network of roads important to the national economy, defense, and mobility.

== History ==
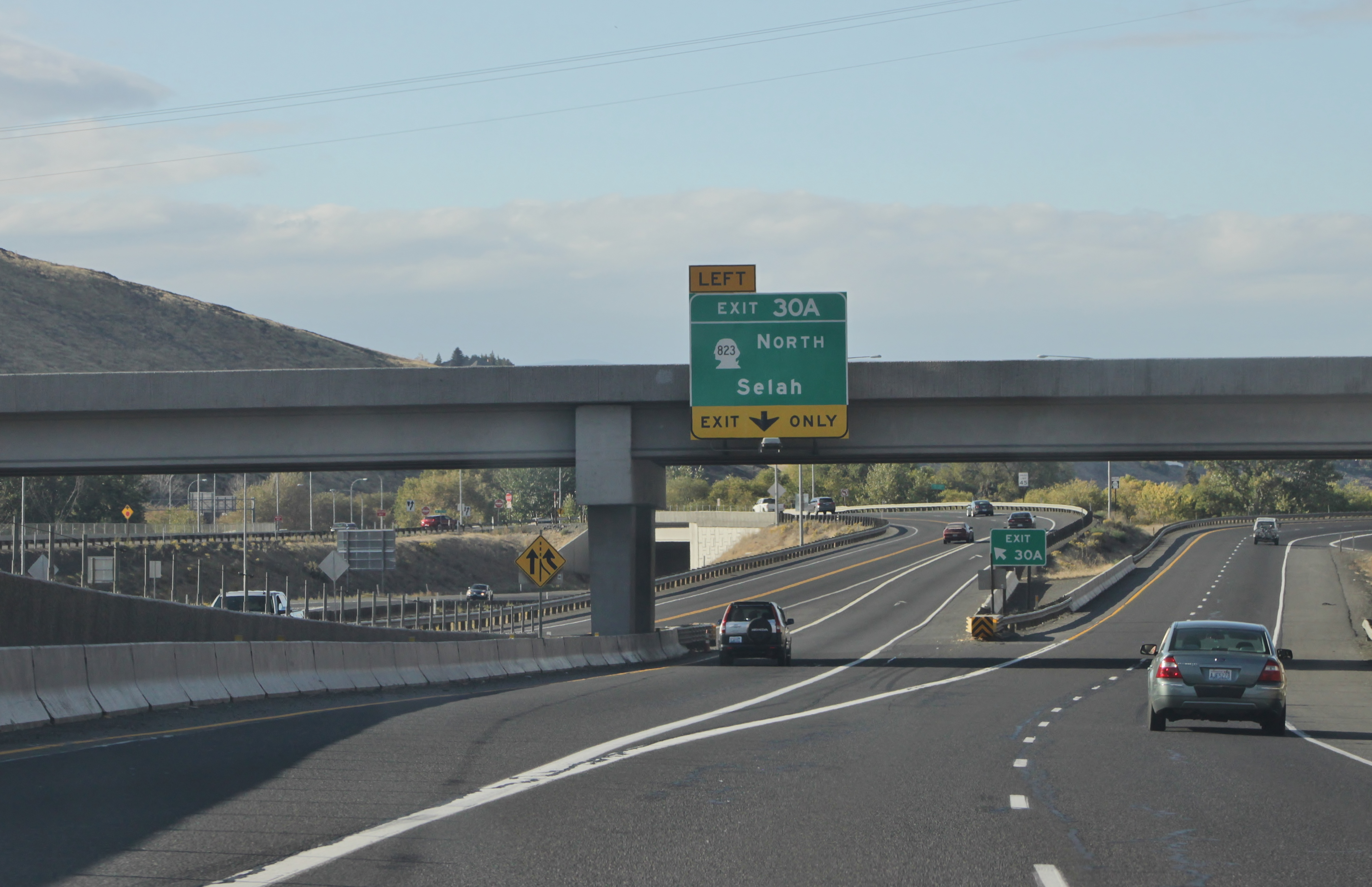
Looking westbound on I-82 at its interchange with SR 823 in southern Selah

The road connecting the Selah Valley to Yakima was built along the west side of the Yakima River by the end of the 19th century, following a section of the Northern Pacific Railway. An interurban railway operated by the Yakima Valley Transportation Company was constructed along the side of the road in 1913. It was shut down in 1935, but was later revived as a seasonal heritage service. The original road was replaced in 1912 by a route on the east side of the river, which was later paved and signed as part of the Inland Empire Highway and Yellowstone Trail. Both named highways were moved to the newly built Canyon Road in 1924.

I-82 was constructed to the east of Selah in 1970, replacing the old highway through the Selah Gap and including two interchanges at Selah Road and Firing Center Road. Selah Road had been rebuilt in 1947 with wider bridges over the Yakima River and railroad, while the north end lacked a direct connection to Selah until the construction of Harrison Road in the early 1970s. The southernmost section of the road, running 0.68 miles (1.09 km) between I-82 and Fasset Avenue in Selah, was added to the state highway system in 1984 and were designated as part of SR 823. The state legislature also included a clause to withhold improvements to the highway unless a mix of state, county, and city funds were obtained. In 1991, SR 823 was extended north by the legislature through Selah and to a junction with SR 821 near the Firing Center Road interchange.

In June 1997, WSDOT began construction on a $24 million project (equivalent to $43 million in 2024 dollars) to rebuild the I-82 interchange and connect SR 823 to US 12 and North 1st Street in northern Yakima. The new interchange and bridges across the Yakima and Naches rivers were completed in December 1998, extending SR 823 by 0.88 miles (1.42 km). The state legislature allocated $9.3 million from its new gas tax in 2005 to build a truck bypass of downtown Selah that would be incorporated into SR 823. The bypass was constructed as an extension of South Wenas Avenue and eliminated a pair of sharp turns to and from a one-block section of Naches Avenue. Construction was delayed from spring 2010 to the following year and was completed on August 1, 2011, during a dedication ceremony that named the bypass for legislator Jim Clements, who lobbied for its inclusion in the 2005 budget. The bypass took a third of the 30,000 vehicles that passed through downtown Selah on a daily basis; SR 823 remains the only means of accessing Selah, but plans to build a third interchange on I-82 were considered by the city government in the late 2010s.

== Major intersections ==
The entire highway is in Yakima County.

Location	mi	km	Destinations	Notes
Yakima	0.00	0.00	North 1st Street	Continuation beyond US 12
Yakima	0.00	0.00	US 12 to I-82 – Naches, Ellensburg, Selah, Richland	Interchange
	0.66	1.06	I-82 (US 97) – Richland, Ellensburg	Interchange
Selah	1.05	1.69	Golf Course Loop Road	Interchange
	5.56	8.95	SR 821 (Canyon Road) to I-82 – Yakima Firing Center	
1.000 mi = 1.609 km; 1.000 km = 0.621 mi
