= Washington State Route 821 =

State highway in central Washington state

State Route 821
- Yakima River Canyon Scenic Byway
- SR 821 highlighted in red

Route information
- Auxiliary route of I-82
- Maintained by WSDOT
- Length: 25.21 mi (40.57 km)
- Existed: 1973–present
- Tourist routes: Yakima River Canyon Scenic Byway

Major junctions
- South end: I-82 / US 97 near Selah
- SR 823 near Selah
- North end: I-82 / US 97 near Ellensburg

Location
- Country: United States
- State: Washington
- Counties: Yakima, Kittitas

Highway system
- State highways in Washington; Interstate; US; State; Scenic; Pre-1964; 1964 renumbering; Former
← US 730	→ SR 823

State Route 821 (SR 821) is a state highway in central Washington state. It runs for 25 miles (40 km) through the Yakima Canyon, following the meandering Yakima River between Selah and Ellensburg. Both ends of the highway are at interchanges with Interstate 82 (I-82) and U.S. Route 97 (US 97).

SR 821 was established in 1973 on the old alignment of US 97, which usurped previous state roads that were part of the Inland Empire Highway. The Yakima Canyon road was constructed in 1924 by the state government to replace a gravel road over the mountains to the west and became popular with tourists. The highway was designated as the Yakima River Canyon Scenic Byway by the state government in 1967 and bypassed five years later by a section of I-82 running uphill to the east.

== Route description ==
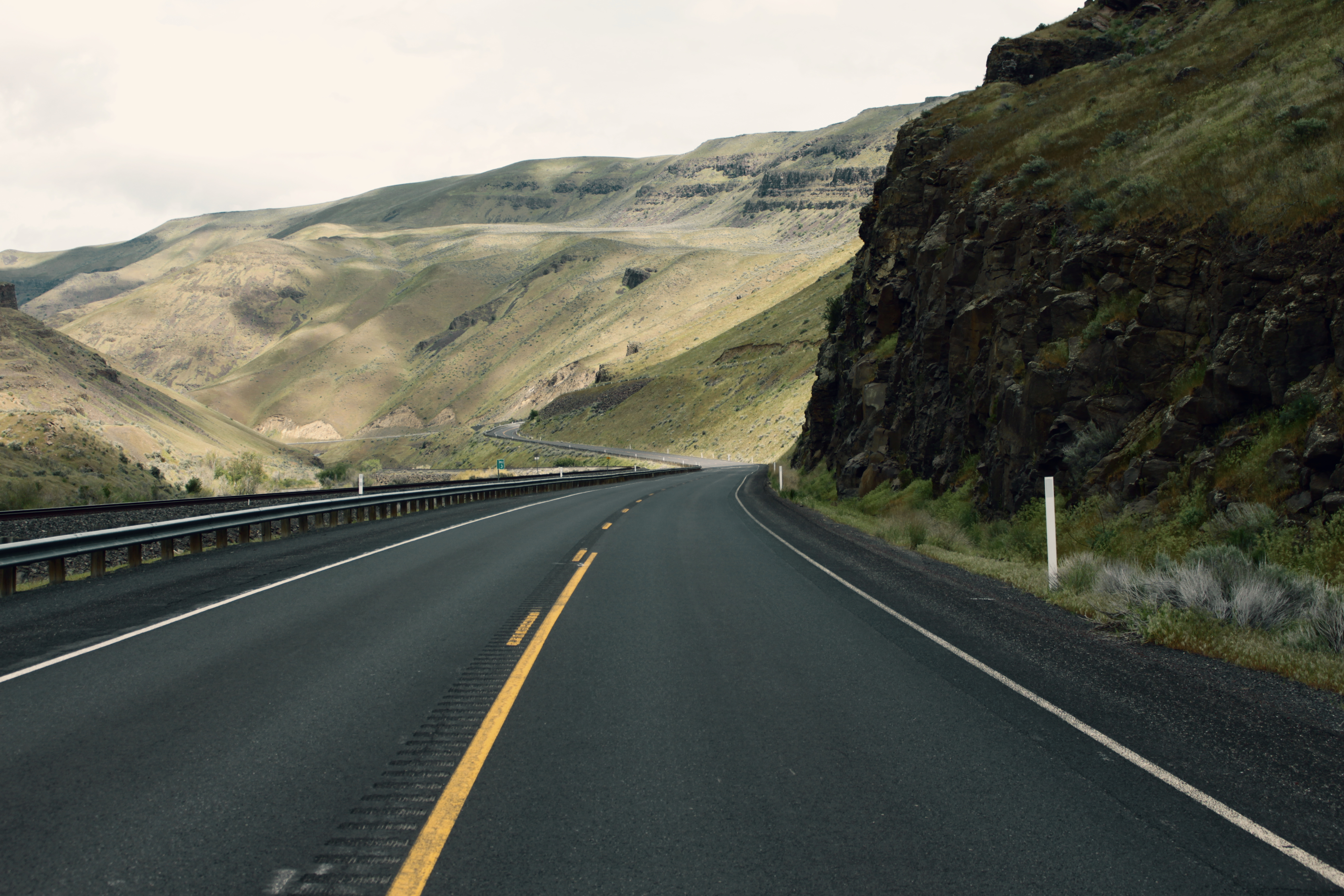
A section of SR 821 in the Yakima River Canyon

SR 821 begins at an interchange with I-82, co-signed with US 97, northeast of Selah in northern Yakima County. The interchange also includes a connection to Firing Center Road, which continues east into the Yakima Training Center, a military installation that spans the mountainous area between Yakima and the Columbia River. SR 821 makes a 90-degree turn to the northeast and intersects the northern terminus of SR 823, a short highway that travels south into downtown Selah. The highway continues north through farms near the community of Pomona and passes the Sundown M Ranch substance abuse treatment center near the mouth of Selah Creek at the Yakima River. It then travels into the narrow Yakima River Canyon to the east of BNSF Railway's Yakima Valley Subdivision, which forms part of the main east–west railroad across south central Washington.

Near the south end of the Yakima River Canyon, which cuts across the Umtanum Ridge, SR 821 crosses into Kittitas County. The two-lane highway generally runs along the bottom of the canyon, to the east of the river and railroad and paralleled to the east by I-82. At its south end, the highway passes downhill from an earlier alignment that was tunneled under a section of the ridge. At Roza Dam, the railroad crosses over to the west side of the river while SR 821 stays uphill from the river, cutting through part of the ridge. The highway continues north, following the cliffs along the meandering river and opposite the railroad and the Wenas Wildlife Area to the west. It passes through 9,000 acres (3,600 ha) of land owned by the Bureau of Land Management, which includes several campgrounds, boat launches, and four recreational areas. The area also has several cattle ranches and farms centered around the Burbank Valley. Midway through the valley, SR 821 passes the Canyon River Ranch, an isolated rest area with shops, restaurants, and cabins that is planned to grow into a resort.

Further north of the ranch is the parking lot for the Umtanum Creek Recreation Area, with a network of hiking trails connected via a footbridge over the Yakima River. After completing a series of hairpin turns along the narrowest section of the valley, SR 821 is rejoined by the railroad and enters the wide Kittitas Valley near several vineyards. The highway turns east at Helen McCabe State Park onto Thrall Road and crosses Wilson Creek before terminating at a partial cloverleaf interchange with I-82 and US 97. From the junction, Canyon Road continues north along the railroad to an interchange with I-90 and into downtown Ellensburg.

SR 821 is designated as the Yakima River Canyon Scenic Byway by the state government, recognizing its natural beauty and recreational opportunities. The byway is visited by 1.1 million drivers annually, of which a third visit recreational areas and campgrounds along the route. The canyon was formed approximately 10 million years ago through the erosion of rocks formed by basalt lava flows. The byway passes through shrub-steppe habitats that are home to trout, bighorn sheep, mule deer, and a variety of visiting or permanent bird species. An interpretive center for the byway was planned to be constructed at Helen McCabe State Park at the north entrance of the byway, using funding from the county government and the Federal Highway Administration, but was cancelled in 2015.

SR 821 is maintained by the Washington State Department of Transportation (WSDOT), which conducts an annual survey on the state's highways to measure traffic volume in terms of annual average daily traffic. The highway's daily vehicle counts range from a minimum of 1,100 vehicles at its northern terminus to a maximum of 5,100 at its southern terminus. SR 821 generally consists of two lanes with a width of 11 feet (3.4 m), with occasional shoulders, and a posted speed limit of 50 miles per hour (80 km/h). Sections of the highway are closed for day-long events that are held annually, including a cattle drive in January or February, a marathon and bicycle tour in the spring, and a heritage tractor run in the summer.

== History ==
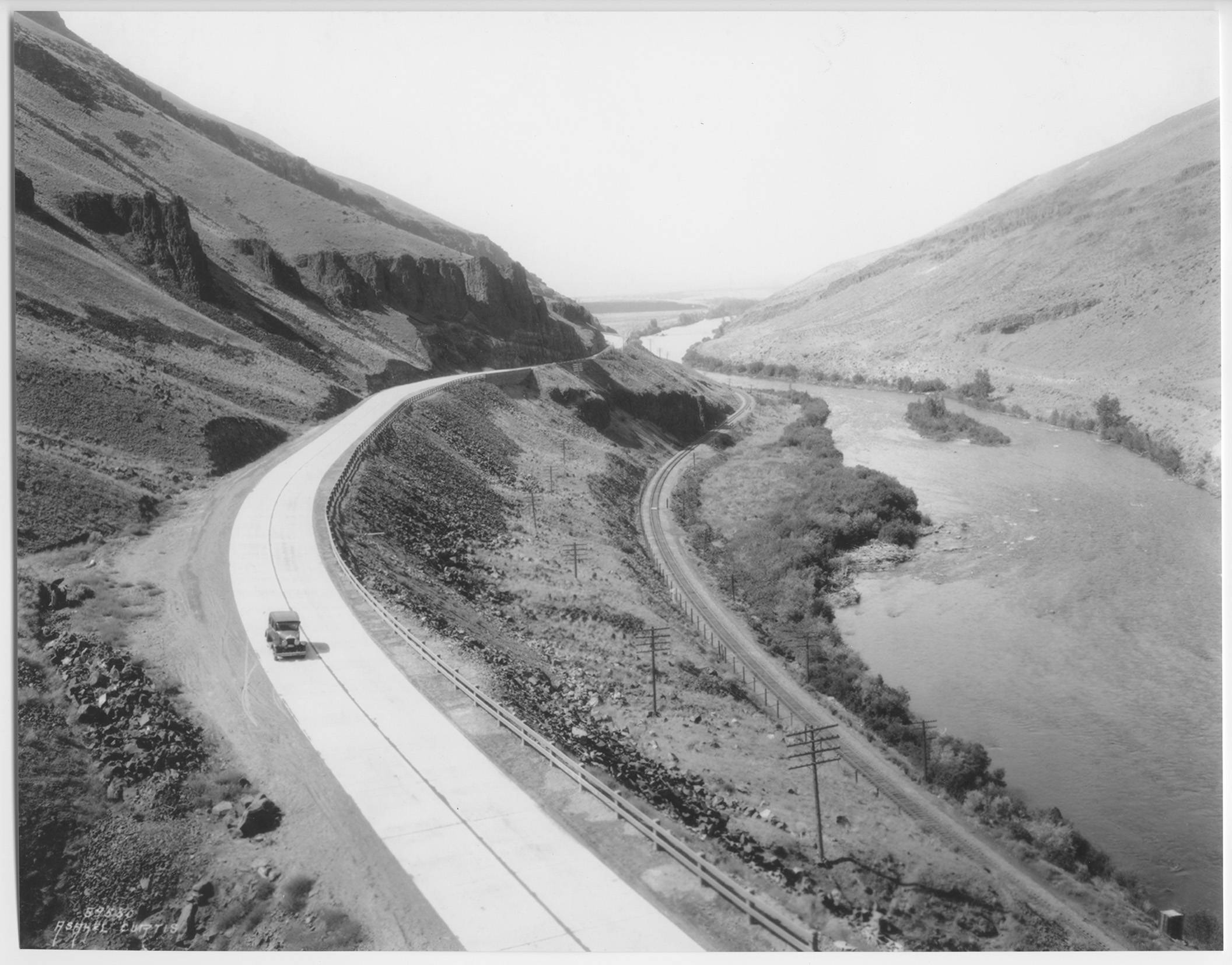
A photograph of the Canyon Highway, taken by Asahel Curtis after concrete paving in 1924

The Yakima River Canyon was historically avoided by Native Americans and later American settlers, who preferred wagon trails along nearby ridges and creeks. One of the main routes across the Umtanum Ridge was a toll road constructed in the 1880s by Jacob Durr through the Wenas Valley and Shushuskin Canyon, west of the canyon route. The toll road was bypassed by the Northern Pacific Railway in 1885, using a route along the west side of the river that was rejected for road construction due to a lack of space.

A road link between Ellensburg and Yakima remained a priority for the state government, who appropriated funds in 1909 to survey the area for a potential state highway. It was named as part of the planned Inland Empire Highway in 1913, forming a major trunk route through the Yakima Valley and Inland Northwest, and a route along the east side of the river was surveyed in the early 1920s by state highway engineers.

Construction on the graded highway, using a surface of crushed rocks, through the Yakima Canyon began in 1920 and was completed on September 12, 1924. It cost approximately $1 million to construct (equivalent to $14.5 million in 2024 dollars) and included several tunnels cut through the lava basalt cliffs using dynamite that were later abandoned. The highway was signed as part of State Road 3 and incorporated into the Yellowstone Trail, a national auto trail, and later the federal numbered highway system created in 1926. Under the federal system, the Ellensburg–Yakima section formed part of US 97, the main north–south route through central Washington and Oregon. The highway was paved with concrete in 1932 and renumbered as Primary State Highway 3 (PSH 3) in 1937. The canyon highway's tunnels were bypassed by a new alignment built closer to the river in 1963, after traffic volumes had outgrown the narrow tunnels.

I-82 was completed east of the canyon over Manastash Ridge in November 1971, bypassing the congested highway through the Yakima River Canyon. The canyon route had been designated as the state's first scenic byway in 1967, following the enactment of the system, and was provisionally numbered and signed as State Route 821. A lower speed limit of 45 miles per hour (72 km/h) was also set on the highway to discourage use by trucks and encourage scenic touring. In 1973, US 97 was rerouted onto I-82 between Ellensburg and Yakima, while the old alignment through the canyon became SR 821. Until the completion of the Thrall Road interchange in the 1980s, SR 821 continued further north to Tjossem Road, where it turned east and crossed I-82. The encroachment of residential development from the north forced the Bureau of Land Management and The Nature Conservancy to buy additional properties in the canyon for preservation in the 1990s.

Beginning in 1996, the state government embarked on a targeted anti-drunk driving campaign along SR 821, which had been the site of over 115 collisions between 1992 and 1995, of which 25 were alcohol-related. The first year of the campaign was hailed as a success, with two consecutive summer months without a recorded collision and 2,200 police stops for driving violations. Eight separate sections of the highway were closed for several weeks in July 1998 due to rockslides and washouts brought by 3 inches (7.6 cm) of rainfall on July 3. The repair cost $750,000 and used funds from the Federal Highway Administration, acquired via an emergency proclamation signed by Governor Gary Locke.

== Major intersections ==
County	Location	mi	km	Destinations	Notes
Yakima		0.00	0.00	I-82 / US 97 – Ellensburg, Yakima	
Yakima		0.29	0.47	SR 823 south (Harrison Road) – Selah	
Kittitas		25.21	40.57	I-82 / US 97 – Ellensburg, Yakima	
1.000 mi = 1.609 km; 1.000 km = 0.621 mi
