= Yakima Transit =

Municipal transit service in Washington, US

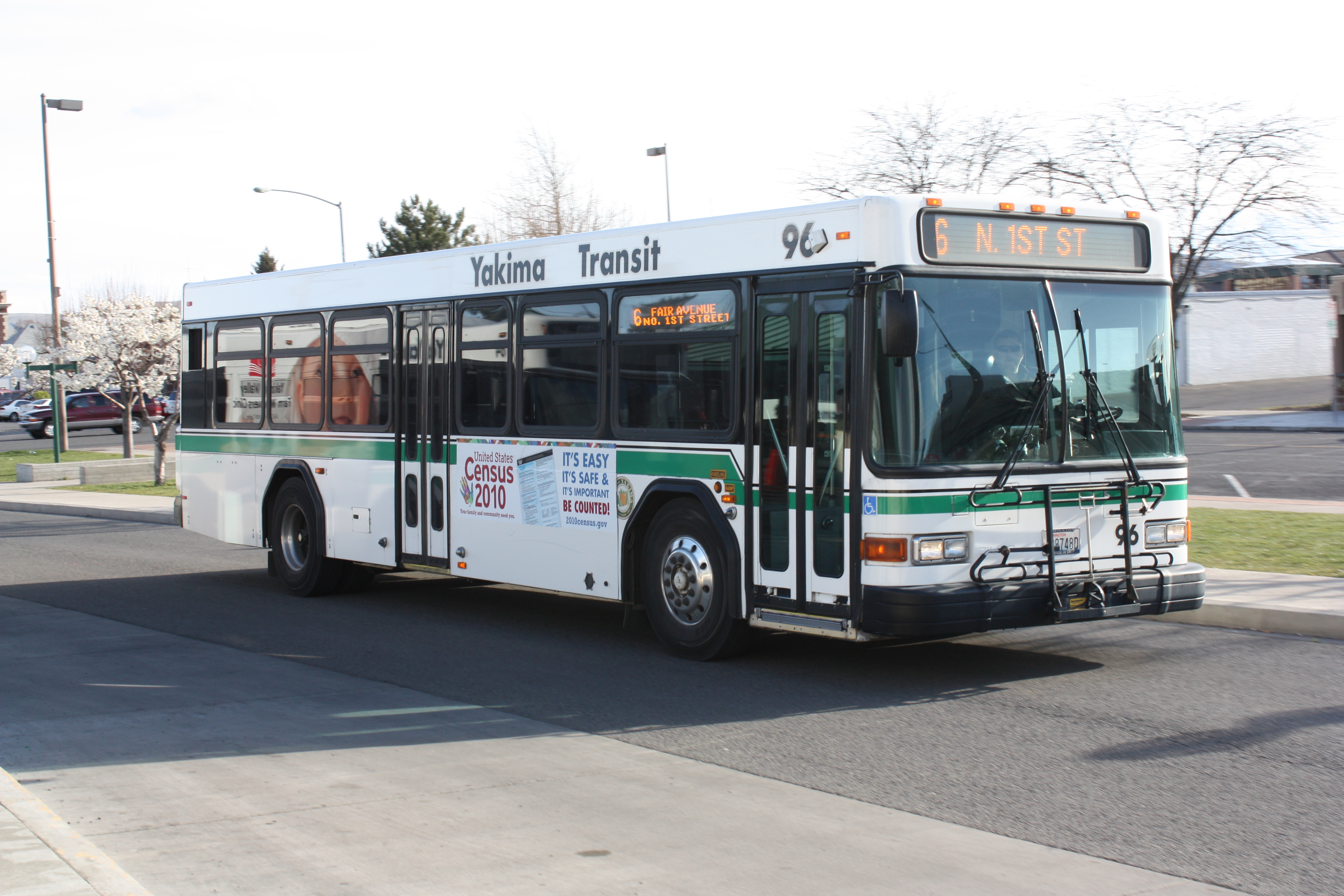
- A Gillig Advantage bus
- Parent: City of Yakima
- Founded: 1966
- Headquarters: 2301 Fruitvale Boulevard
- Locale: Yakima, Washington
- Service area: Yakima County, Washington
- Service type: Bus, paratransit
- Routes: 9
- Fleet: 18 buses, 24 vans
- Annual ridership: 739,245 (2025)
- Website: yakimatransit.org

Yakima Transit is a public transit operator in the city of Yakima, Washington. It a department of the city government and has nine fixed bus routes, a paratransit system, and a commuter route to Ellensburg. The system was established in 1966 after the city government took over Yakima City Lines from a private company that had succeeded an earlier streetcar system operated by the Yakima Valley Transportation Company. Yakima City Lines was renamed to Yakima Transit in 1978 and expanded as a city department; since 2005, it has also served or connected with neighboring Selah and Union Gap.

== History ==
Yakima's first mass transit system was a streetcar line constructed by the Yakima Valley Transportation Company (YVTC) on 3 miles (4.8 km) of track that opened on December 25, 1907. The company expanded the streetcar system to 48 miles (77 km) by 1920 and opened interurban service to the neighboring communities of Selah and Wiley City, where specialized cars also carried freight and produce. Passenger patronage on the streetcar system declined in the 1930s and was followed by the end of interurban service in 1935. The city government sought to remove streetcar tracks from Yakima Avenue, which had become a major automobile thoroughfare, and allowed the YVTC to move its freight operations to adjacent streets in exchange for the end of passenger service. On February 1, 1947, YVTC operated its final passenger streetcar; Yakima was the last city in Washington state to have an operational passenger streetcar system. The rails continued to be used for freight transport until 1985 and a section was preserved for use by the Yakima Electric Railway Museum beginning in 1974.

The YVTC, a subsidiary of the Union Pacific Railroad, introduced its first motorized buses in 1924 and continued to operate the service as a replacement for the streetcar system. The company announced plans to not renew its franchise to operate buses in Yakima when it expired in March 1957. They were replaced by Yakima City Lines, another private company, after its city franchise was approved by voters. Yakima City Lines ceased operations on May 31, 1966, after several years of financial difficulties. Voters approved a household tax to fund transit in a referendum on October 3, 1966, which was followed by an agreement between the city government and a private operator to resume transit service. The assets of Yakima City Lines were purchased by the city government in 1970 and the fleet was replaced by 12 new buses purchased from General Motors. The system was renamed to Yakima Transit in 1978.

The household tax was replaced by a 0.3 percent sales tax after voters approved a new transit plan in the November 1980 elections. Yakima Transit began funding paratransit service, which it initially contracted to a private company, in 1992 to comply with the Americans with Disabilities Act. A proposal to expand Yakima Transit into a countywide public transportation benefit area named SunTran was rejected by 51.6 percent of voters on September 20, 1994. In August 1999, the city government approved a pilot program to move one Yakima Transit route to a private contractor, who would operate smaller buses to accommodate the lower ridership. The contractor pilot continued until 2002, when the approval of a five-year contract was declined by the city council. Yakima Transit expanded into neighboring Selah and Union Gap in 2005 with new routes funded jointly by the city governments and the Yakima Valley Conference of Governments.

Yakima Transit launched a commuter express route to Ellensburg on November 28, 2011, with weekday service to the Central Washington University campus. The service was funded by the university and several government partners and operated initially by HopeSource, a non-profit social services organization. The route was transferred to a private contractor in 2015 and carried 45,000 total passengers that year.

== Services ==
Yakima Transit has nine fixed local routes that provide bus service to most of the city. On weekdays, these routes operate from 6 a.m. to 7 p.m. on schedules that range from hourly to half-hourly. On weekends, service has more limited operating hours and runs on an hourly schedule; the system has six local routes that operate on Sundays. The agency's paratransit service, named Dial-a-Ride, is contracted out to a private company and serves passengers with disabilities or senior citizens. The paratransit service covers the entire city and extends to Union Gap. Yakima Transit maintains two park-and-ride lots that are served by fixed routes.

The agency also manages a commuter bus between Yakima Airport, Downtown Yakima, Selah, and Central Washington University in Ellensburg. It is operated by a private contractor and uses larger coach-style buses suitable for long distances; the route has six daily round trips with a seventh added during the school year. The bus route is funded by the city governments of Yakima and Selah, the Washington State Department of Transportation, and Central Washington University. Yakima Transit also connects with neighboring cities that operate their own transit systems. Selah Transit has a route that shares stops with Yakima Transit buses; until 2018, the system had been operated by Yakima Transit under a contract with the Selah city government. Yakima Transit also provides fare-free shuttles to the annual Central Washington State Fair.

The single-ride fare on local routes is $1 for adult passengers and $0.50 for passengers with disabilities or aged 62 or older. The Ellensburg commuter route charges $5 for a one-way trip. Transfers are free within one of three daily time periods. Yakima Transit also offers monthly passes for all of its fare categories that are sold at three city facilities. Fares have been free for youth passengers aged 18 or younger since 2022 as part of a program funded by the state government.

== Administration ==
The transit system is directly operated by the Yakima city government and is classified under the Public Works Department. As of 2024, Yakima Transit has 53 employees that are located at city hall and several public works facilities. A storage lot and fueling station for Yakima Transit buses is planned to be constructed near the public works complex on Fruitvale Boulevard. Yakima Transit is one of six municipal transit systems in Washington, of which three are in Yakima County; most others are operated at the county level or by public transportation benefit areas.

== Fleet ==
Yakima Transit directly operates 18 buses for fixed routes and 24 demand response vehicles for paratransit. The entire fixed route fleet comprises diesel buses manufactured by Gillig; buses using other fuel sources have been considered for future purchases.

== See also ==
- Yakima Electric Railway Museum
- Yakima Valley Transportation Company
