= Yakima Electric Railway =

Yakima Electric Railway may refer to:

- Yakima Electric Railway Museum
- Yakima Valley Transportation Company
