= Yakima Ridge =

Anticline mountain ridge in Washington, USA

- Location within Washington (state)

Highest point
- Elevation: 4,195 ft (1,279 m) NAVD 88
- Prominence: 1,224 ft (373 m)
- Coordinates: 46°35′25″N 120°04′39″W

Geography
- Location: Yakima and Benton, counties, Washington
- Topo map: USGS Black Rock Spring

Yakima Ridge is a long anticline mountain ridge in Yakima County and Benton County in the U.S. state of Washington. From its western end just north of the city of Yakima, the ridge runs east-southeast through the Yakima Training Center to its eastern end at Hanford Reach National Monument and the Hanford Site. Yakima Ridge is paralleled on the north by Umtanum Ridge and on the south by the Rattlesnake Hills. Moxee Valley and Black Rock Valley lie south of Yakima Ridge.

Yakima Ridge is part of the Yakima Fold Belt of east-tending long ridges formed by the folding of Miocene Columbia River basalt flows.

The Yakima River cut a water gap through Yakima Ridge at Selah Gap. The river cut through other ridges at locations including Umtanum Ridge Water Gap and Union Gap at Ahtanum Ridge.
