= Treetop =

Treetop or Treetops may refer to:

- The top of a tree
- Tree Top, an American fruit processing company
- Treetops Hotel, Aberdare National Park, Kenya
- Treetops (state park), former estate of torch singer and actress Libby Holman, now the Mianus River State Park, Connecticut, USA
- Treetops School, a special school in Grays, Essex, England
- Treetops, East Virginia, fictional setting of Shoe (comic strip)
- "Treetop", nickname of Jack Straus (1930-1988), American poker player and winner of the 1982 World Series of Poker Main Event
- "Treetop", nickname of Delbert Fowler (born 1958), American football player in the Canadian Football League
