= Yakima Valley =

Yakima Valley may refer to:

- Yakima River Valley in southeastern portion of the state of Washington
- Yakima Valley AVA (viticultural area)
- Yakima Valley Transportation Company a former bus and rail transportation company in the state of Washington
