= Selah Airstrip =

Mettie Airstrip
- IATA: none; ICAO: none; FAA LID: Z99

Summary
- Owner/Operator: United States Army
- Coordinates: 46°42′50″N 120°19′40″W
- Interactive map of Mettie Airstrip

Runways
| Direction | Length | | Surface |
| Direction | ft | m | Surface |
|---|---|---|---|
| 12H/30H | 4,600 | 1,402 | Asphalt |

The Mettie Airstrip (FAA LID: Z99), formerly the Selah Airstrip, is a small military airstrip located on the Yakima Training Center (YTC) with a single runway of about 4,600 feet (1,400 m) in length and 75 feet (23 m) in width. It was built by various elements of the 864th Engineer Battalion from Ft. Lewis WA in the summer of 1976.
