= John Alden Shoudy =

- Born: December 14, 1841; Paw Paw, Illinois, U.S.
- Died: May 25, 1901 (aged 59); Ellensburg, Washington, U.S.
- Known for: Founder of Ellensburg, Washington

John Alden Shoudy was an American businessman and politician, known as an early settler and founder of Ellensburg, Washington.

== Early life ==
Shoudy was born in Illinois in 1841, the son of Israel and Rebecca Hemstreet Shoudy, both originally from the Albany, New York area. He fought in the American Civil War for three years, and after the war he moved to California with his brother-in-law, Dexter Horton.

== Career ==
He married Mary Ellen Stuart and moved to Seattle. He went to the Kittitas Valley in 1871 as businesspeople in Seattle were interested in building a road from Seattle to the Kittitas Valley. He purchased a small trading post from Andrew Jackson "A.J." Splawn, called "Robber's Roost", which was the first business in the valley established by Splawn a year earlier to trade with the local Indians. The location of the structure commemorated by a placard and small stone monument. Shoudy decided to stay in Kittitas Valley and built a cabin there. Although Shoudy was not the first settler in the Kittitas Valley, he was responsible for platting the city of Ellensburgh and named the streets in what would become the downtown district. He filed an 80-acre plat for the town on July 20, 1875 and named it after his wife Mary Ellen as Ellensburgh (the final H was later dropped). Plots of land were then sold to new settlers and businessmen coming to the area. He was a member of the Washington Territorial Legislature in 1883, and played a role in the formation of Kittitas County.

== Death ==
Shoudy died on May 25, 1901.
