= Roza Dam =

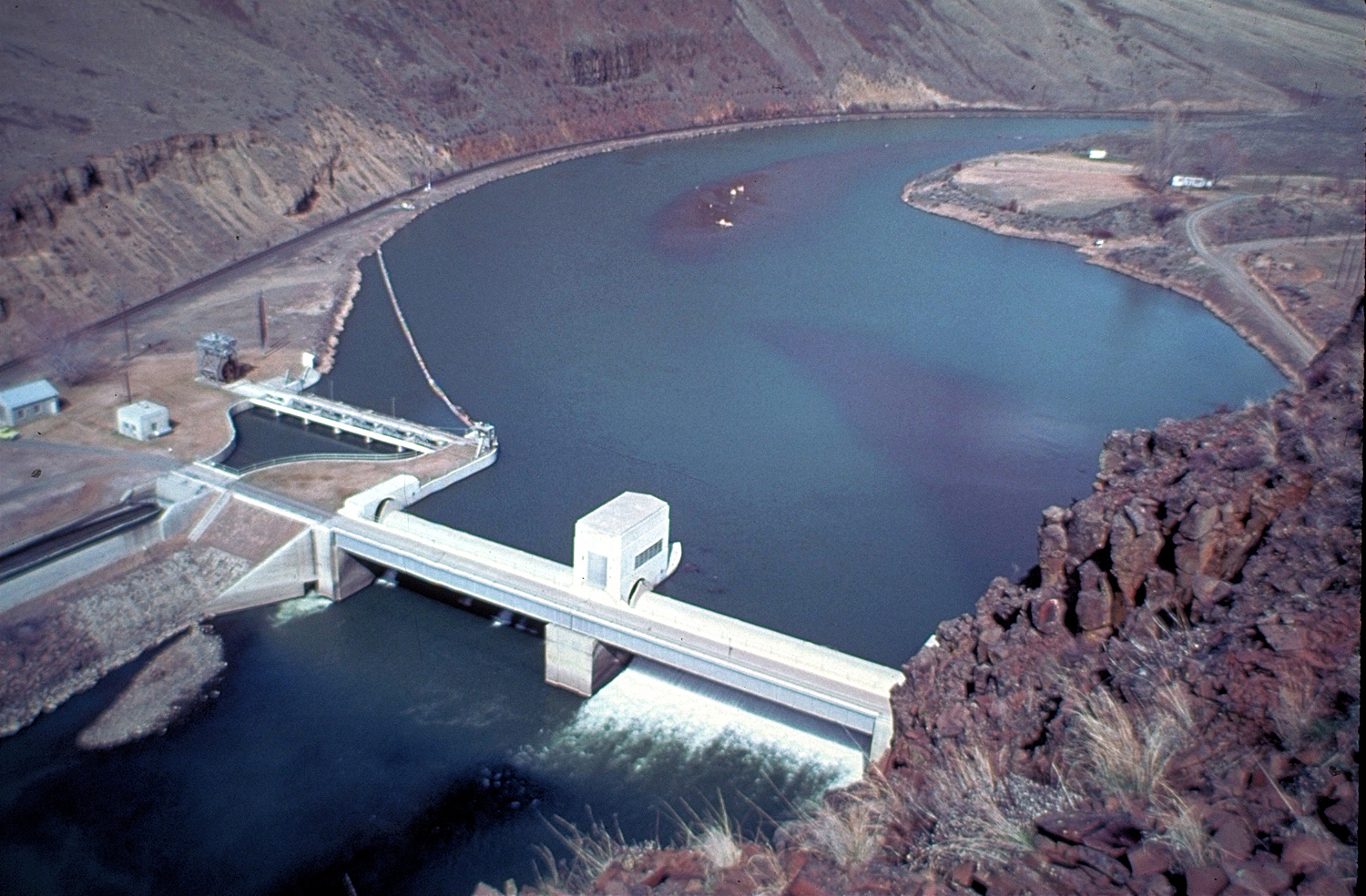
- Roza Dam
- Interactive map of Roza Dam
- Location: Kittitas County, Washington
- Coordinates: 46.749036°N 120.465603°W

Dam and spillways
- Impounds: Yakima River
- Height: 67 ft (20 m)
- Length: 486 ft (148 m)

Power Station
- Turbines: 1x 12.9 MW
- Installed capacity: 12.9 MW
- Annual generation: 47.683 GWh

Roza Dam (National ID # WA00275) is a diversion dam on the Yakima River, about 10 miles (16 km) north of Yakima, just west of SR 821. This gravity dam was built in 1939, is 486 feet (148 m) long at the crest and 67 feet (20 m) high, and impounds approximately 100 acres (40 ha) of water. The dam also has 12.9 MW power production capacity, online as of 1956. There is also an adult fish ladder that collects fish in a trap, where they are counted and then released above the dam. A portion of wild fish are collected weekly to use as broodstock for the Cle Elum Supplementation and Research Facility.

== See also ==
- List of dams in the Columbia River watershed
