= Dexter Horton =

American early settler of Seattle, Washington

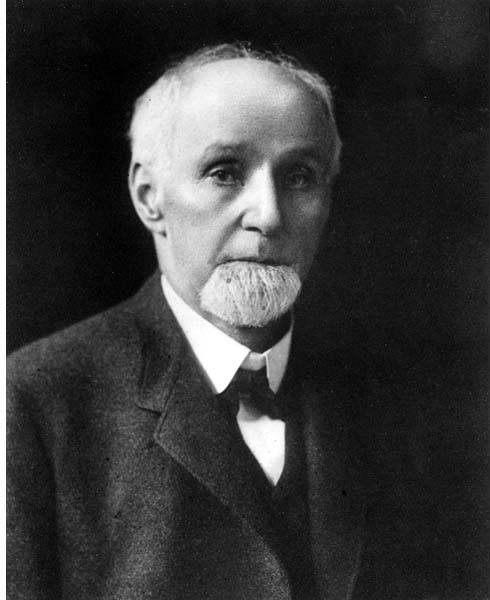
Dexter Horton

Dexter Horton (1825 – 1904) was an early settler, merchant and the founder of the first bank in the city of Seattle. Before his founding of the Bank of Dexter Horton in 1870 financial transactions were conducted by merchants.

Dexter Horton was born in 1825 in Seneca Lake, New York. He was raised on a farm his family acquired near Princeton, Illinois. As a young man he emigrated to Oregon with others who were living in his area, settling near the state capitol of Salem. He relocated to Seattle in May 1853 with a group of future Northwest notables including Aaron and Thomas Mercer, Daniel Bagley, John Pike, and William Shoudy, with his wife and daughter joining him soon after. He spent his first year in Seattle making pilings and shingles for William Nathaniel Bell at his Smith Cove mill, working brief stints at the lumber mills in Port Townsend and Port Gamble, and hauling lumber for Thomas Mercer at Lake Union, before coming to work at Henry Yesler's newly completed sawmill in the summer of 1854.

After his tenure with Yesler he partnered with David Phillips, another member of his 1853 settler party, to open a general store on the East side of First Avenue South in Seattle's current Pioneer Square area, which became a quick success, prompting them to open a branch store in Olympia which Phillips would continue to run after the dissolution of their partnership in 1861. A part of the business was making loans and accepting deposits from customers. By 1870 Dexter Horton closed his dry goods business and rekindling his partnership with Phillips, established Seattle's first dedicated bank, Phillips, Horton & Company. Starting with a capital stock of $50,000, it opened for business in a wooden building Horton owned on the Northwest corner of First Avenue and Washington Street. Phillips died in 1872, with Arthur A. Denny stepping in as partner, after which the name was changed to Dexter Horton & Company. After Horton's retirement the bank would continue to grow into one of Seattle's leading banks was would later merge with the Seattle First National Bank, which eventually merged into the Bank of America.

According to Seattle lore, decades after the 1856 Battle of Seattle, Seattle's future fire chief Gardner Kellogg was excavating his house and found a shell from the USS Decatur that had buried itself without exploding. He stuck it under a tree stump that he was trying to burn out and went off to lunch; Dexter Horton stopped by to warm the seat of his pants at the fire, and as it exploded, nearly became the last casualty of the battle of Seattle.

Horton was married to Hannah Eliza Shoudy, sister of John Alden Shoudy, in 1844, and they had three children but two died early. After her death, he married Caroline E. Parsons (d. 1878) on September 29, 1873, and they had one daughter. He then married Arabella C. Agard (1827-1914) on September 14, 1882.

Horton died at his Seattle home from heart disease on July 29, 1904 at the age of 78. He is buried at Lake View Cemetery.
