= Wiley City, Washington =

Unincorporated community in Washington, United States

- Unincorporated community
- Location within Yakima County Location within Washington (state)
- Coordinates: 46°33′05″N 120°38′57″W
- Country: United States
- State: Washington
- County: Yakima
- Elevation: 1,322 ft (403 m)
- Time zone: UTC-8 (Pacific (PST))
  - Summer (DST): UTC-7 (PDT)
- ZIP code: 98909
- Area code: 509
- GNIS feature ID: 1512807

Wiley City is an unincorporated community in Yakima County, Washington, United States, located near the southwest city limits of Yakima.

== History ==
In 1871, Hugh Wiley settled in the area now known as Wiley City. The town was founded in 1910 on part of the property of James J. Wiley, son of Hugh Wiley.

The Yakima Valley Transportation Company (YVT) built a railroad line connecting the town with Yakima in 1910. YVT provided both electric interurban service and freight service to Wiley City, but passenger service was discontinued in 1935. Freight service continued until 1985, when the YVT itself was abandoned, and the tracks were removed within a few years of the closure. Heritage trolley cars of the Yakima Interurban Lines Association carried tourists on the YVT tracks between Wiley City and Yakima from 1974 to 1985, mainly on summer weekends.
