= Vagabond Army Heliport =

- IATA: none; ICAO: KFCT; FAA LID: FCT

Summary
- Owner: US Army ATCA ASO
- Operator: Mark Flores
- Location: Yakima Training Center, Yakima County, Washington
- Built: 1945
- Elevation AMSL: 1,370 ft / 418 m
- Coordinates: 46°40′10″N 120°27′30″W
- Interactive map of Vagabond Army Heliport

Runways
Direction	Length		Surface
Direction	ft	m	Surface
5H/23H	1,602	488	Asphalt

Vagabond Army Heliport (ICAO: KFCT, FAA LID: FCT), formerly Vagabond Army Airfield, is located at the Yakima Training Center (YTC) in the U.S. state of Washington. Currently, only rotary winged aircraft are authorized to land at this facility as the airfield has been closed to fixed-wing aircraft. The existing 1,600-foot (490 m) runway currently serves as a hover lane for approaches and departures. All repair and maintenance on the base is to accommodate rotary winged aircraft. The heliport has 20 parking pads for use by various types of helicopters.
