= Umtanum Ridge Water Gap =

Geologic feature in Washington, United States

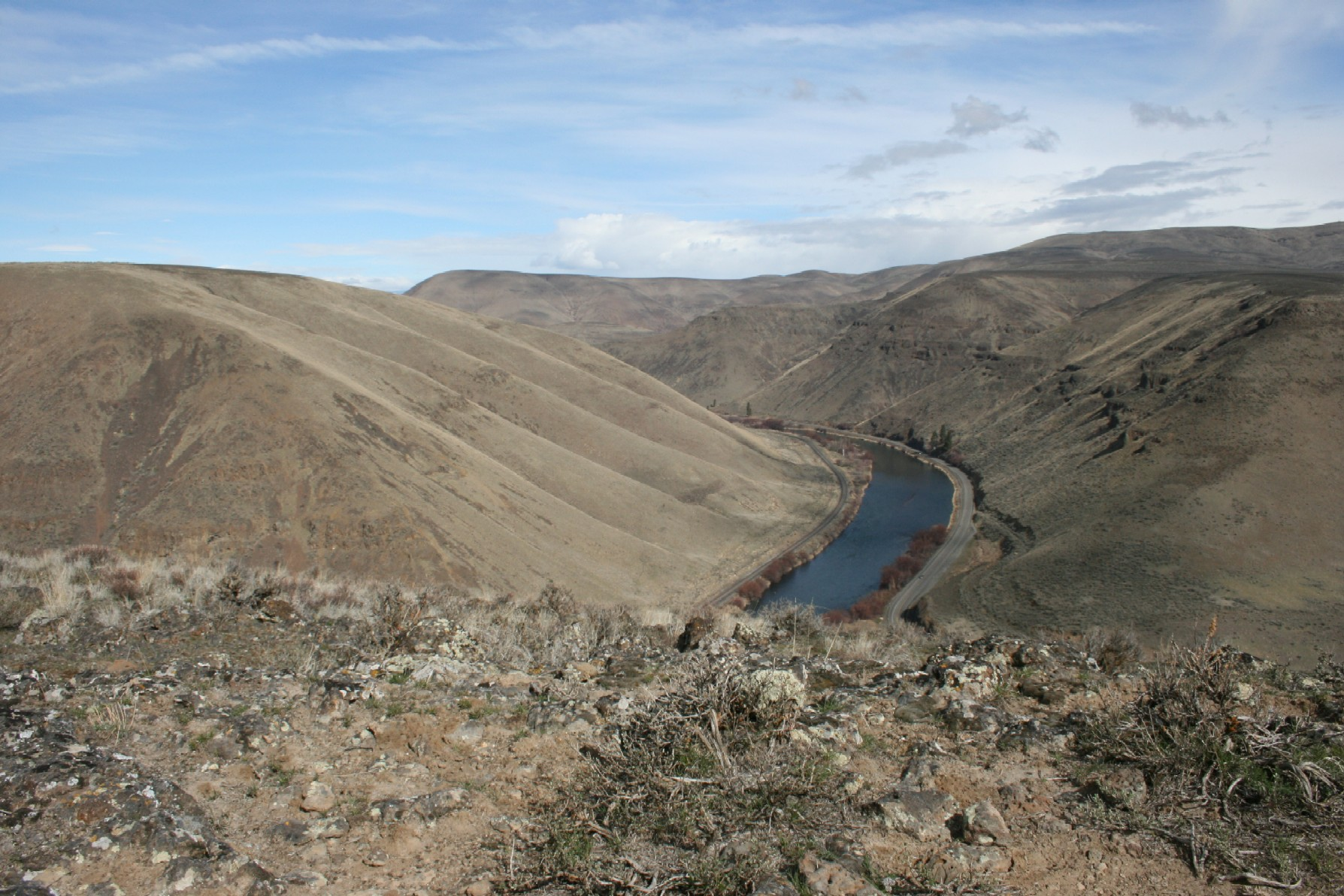
- A view north from Umtanum Ridge into the Yakima River Canyon from the west of the Yakima River.

- Location within Washington (state)
- Location: central Washington state
- Coordinates: 46°51′00″N 120°32′40″W
- Designated: 1980

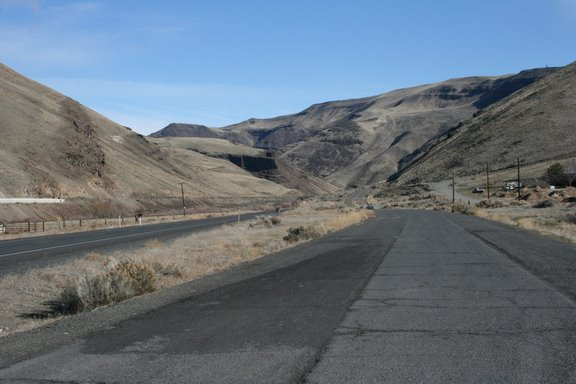
Photo showing roads parallel to the Yakima River as it discharges from the Yakima River Canyon outside of the city of Selah.

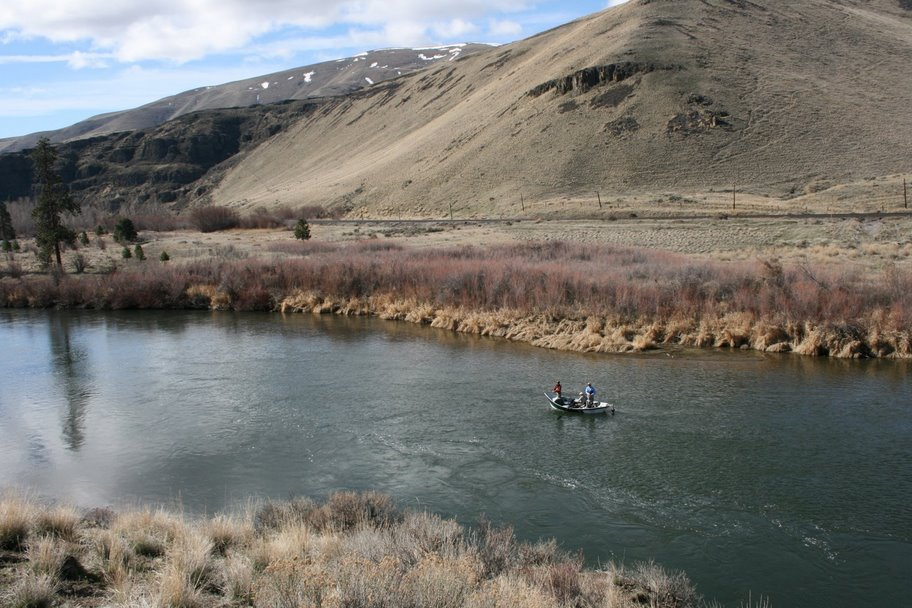
Fly fishing from drift boat on the Yakima River in the Yakima River Canyon.

Umtanum Ridge Water Gap is a geologic feature in Washington state in the United States. It includes the Yakima Canyon (or "Yakima River Canyon"), and is located between the cities of Ellensburg and Yakima in central Washington. Washington State Route 821 (formerly numbered "U.S. Route 97") was once the main route between Ellensburg and Yakima. The old highway still runs close to the river through the canyon, with Interstate 82 (which replaced the old highway) currently carrying most traffic between Ellensburg and Yakima on large bridges nearby.

The Umtanum Ridge Water Gap was designated a National Natural Landmark in 1980. The landmark is characterized by a series of steep-sided ridges in the Columbia River basalt which are cut through axially by the Yakima River. A water gap was cut by the Yakima River through anticlines named "Manastash Ridge" and "Umtanum Ridge". These anticlines are part of the Yakima Fold Belt near the western edge of the Columbia River Plateau.

== Geologic history ==
The great basalt flows of the Columbia Basin and of the Ellensburg Formation, in some places over 5000 meters (17,000 feet) thick, have been folded into ridges (anticlines) and valleys (synclines) running roughly east–west as a result of north–south compression. On its way to join the Columbia River, the Yakima River cuts from the Kittitas Valley southward through four major ridges formed by this compression: the Manastash Ridge, the Umtanum Ridge, the Yakima Ridge, and the Ahtanum Ridge to reach the Yakima Valley.

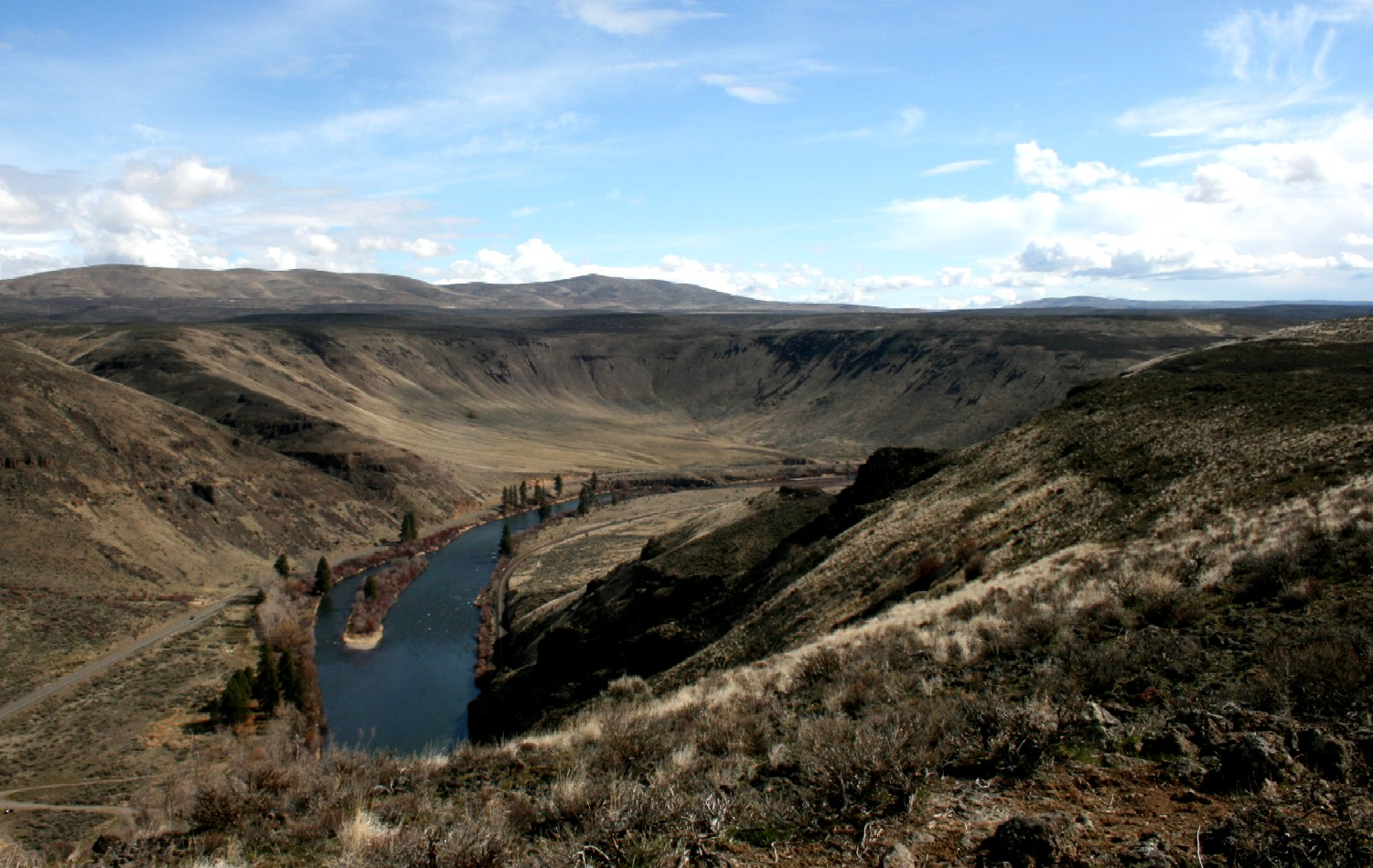
A view south from Umtanum Ridge into the Yakima Canyon.

The highest ridge through which the Yakima flows, the Umtanum Ridge, rises to 983 meters (3225 feet) within 1 km of the river, which lies at about 470 meters (1542 feet) in elevation at the closest point. This unusual juxtaposition (rivers cutting through ridges rather than flowing through apparently more favorable routes) is an example of geologic precedence. The ancient Yakima River is believed to have been there, flowing southward above the relatively flat basalt layers. As the layers compressed, the anticlines slowly rose. The river continued to follow its historic course, cutting downward through the basalt to maintain a relative level. This view is supported by the significant meanders found in the canyon today; when a river has meanders, they tend to be preserved in rock as the river eats into a rising anticline.

== Locations ==
| Location | Coordinates |
|---|---|
| Manastash Ridge | 46°51′27″N 120°23′00″W |
| Umtanum Ridge at the point where it bifurcates into north & south ridges | 46°51′00″N 120°32′40″W |
| Umtanum Water Gap of the Yakima Canyon | 46°48′38″N 120°26′40″W |

== Literature ==
- Allen, John Eliot; Burns, Marjorie; Sargent, Sam C. (c. 1986). Cataclysms on the Columbia : a layman's guide to the features produced by the catastrophic Bretz floods in the Pacific Northwest. Portland, OR: Timber Press. p. 104. ISBN 0-88192-067-3.
- Alt, David & Hyndman, Donald (1984). Roadside Geology of Washington. Mountain Press Publishing Company. ISBN 0-87842-160-2.
- Alt, David (2001). Glacial Lake Missoula & its Humongous Floods. Mountain Press Publishing Company. ISBN 0-87842-415-6.
- Babcock, Scott; Carson, Bob (2000). Hiking Washington's Geology. The Mountaineers. ISBN 0-89886-548-4.
- Bjornstad, Bruce (2006). On the Trail of the Ice Age Floods: A Geological Guide to the Mid-Columbia Basin. Keokee Books; San Point, Idaho. ISBN 0-89886-548-4.
- Bretz, J Harlen (1923). The Channeled Scabland of the Columbia Plateau. Journal of Geology, v.31, p.617-649.
- Mason, Charles L. (c. 2006). The Geological History of the Wenatchee Valley and Adjacent Vicinity. Wenatchee, Washington: World Publishing Company. ISBN 0-9719820-1-5.
- Mueller, Ted and Marge (1997). Fire, Faults & Floods. University of Idaho Press, Moscow, Idaho. ISBN 0-89301-206-8.
- Channeled Scabland of Eastern Washington:The Geologic Story of the Spokane Flood. U.S. Government Printing Office, Washington D.C. 1982.
- Benchmark (2002). Washington Road and Recreation Atlas. Medford, Oregon: Benchmark Maps. ISBN 0-929591-53-4.
