= Tree Top =

American fruit processing cooperative

Tree Top, Inc.
- Type: Agricultural cooperative
- Industry: Fruit processing
- Founded: 1960; 66 years ago
- Founder: Bill Charbonneau
- Headquarters: Selah, Washington, US
- Number of locations: Wenatchee and Prosser, Washington, Woodburn and Medford, Oregon and Oxnard, California
- Area served: United States
- Products: Apple juice, apple sauce, purees, fruit pouches, nectars, natural flavors, dried apples
- Revenue: $345 million
- Members: 1,000
- Number of employees: 1,008
- Subsidiaries: Northwest Naturals
- Website: www.treetop.com

Tree Top, Inc. is a grower-owned fruit processing cooperative in the United States, the first of its type in the country. 1,100 apple and pear growers in Washington, Idaho, and Oregon own the cooperative, with the majority of the growers from Washington.

== History ==
Tree Top was founded by Bill Charbonneau, who purchased an apple processing plant in Selah, Washington, after moving from southern California with his family. In the 1950s, Charbonneau developed a brand of apple juice. A contest held among his employees led to choosing the name "Tree Top" due to the perception that the highest quality fruit grows at the tops of trees. In 1960, a group of apple growers purchased Charbonneau Packing Corporation from Bill Charbonneau and established Tree Top, Inc. as a grower-owned cooperative. The purchase included the Tree Top trademark, the company's property and machinery in Selah, and processing equipment at its Cashmere plant. In 2008, the cooperative had nearly 1,000 grower/owners in Washington, Oregon and Idaho and along with its subsidiary, Sabroso Company, produced a wide array of fruit-based products and ingredients, including Tree Top apple juice, apple sauce, and fresh sliced apples.

In August 2010, Sabroso's branded products and manufacturing facilities were integrated into Tree Top's operations. Sabroso's facilities in Medford and Woodburn, Oregon, and Oxnard, California, produced fruit purées, dried fruit flakes, and other fruit preparations for the food manufacturing and foodservice markets.

By 2015, Tree Top had expanded its manufacturing operations to include a new fruit-sorting facility, strawberry processing, and production lines for single-serving fruit pouches. That year, Seattle Business magazine named Tree Top its Food/Beverage Processor of the Year in the large-firm category, citing its investments in processing facilities, new products, and packaging.

In 2022, Tree Top began expanding its processing facility in Prosser, Washington, in preparation for relocating fruit purée production from Medford, Oregon. The project initially included more than $6 million in plant improvements, according to construction permits reported by the Tri-Cities Area Journal of Business. In May 2023, the company announced that it had begun fruit purée production at the upgraded Prosser facility, which was designed to process apples, pears, berries, and stone fruits. The Medford plant closed later that year.

In November 2024, Tree Top launched an online store offering its products directly to consumers. The company introduced updated branding and packaging for its juices and apple sauces in 2025.

In March 2026, Tree Top reported that it had invested approximately $30 million in its Prosser plant over the preceding three years, doubling the facility's fruit purée production capacity. The company also proposed purchasing approximately 40 acres (16 ha) of adjacent land from the Port of Benton for further development, including warehousing and additional manufacturing facilities.
