= Selah, Washington =

- City
- Logo

- Location of Selah, Washington
- Coordinates: 46°38′15″N 120°32′28″W
- Country: United States
- State: Washington
- County: Yakima
- Founded: 1871
- Incorporated: March 17, 1919

Government
  - Type: Mayor–council
  - Body: City council

Area
  - Total: 4.64 sq mi (12.01 km^{2})
  - Land: 4.58 sq mi (11.86 km^{2})
  - Water: 0.058 sq mi (0.15 km^{2})
- Elevation: 1,293 ft (394 m)

Population (2020)
  - Total: 8,153
  - Estimate (2021): 8,208
  - Density: 1,765.4/sq mi (681.62/km^{2})
- Time zone: UTC-8 (PST)
  - Summer (DST): UTC-7 (PDT)
- ZIP code: 98942
- Area code: 509
- FIPS code: 53-63280
- GNIS feature ID: 2411862
- Website: selahwa.gov

Selah is a city in Yakima County, Washington, United States. It is directly north of Yakima and part of its metropolitan area. The city's population was 8,153 at the 2020 census.

== History ==
The name Selah originates from an indigenous word meaning "still water" or "smooth water". Selah was incorporated as a city on March 17, 1919.

In July 2020, the city was the subject of a New York Times story examining small town reaction to non-violent protests about racial inequality which noted anecdotal evidence of uneven enforcement of laws and rules to people of color.

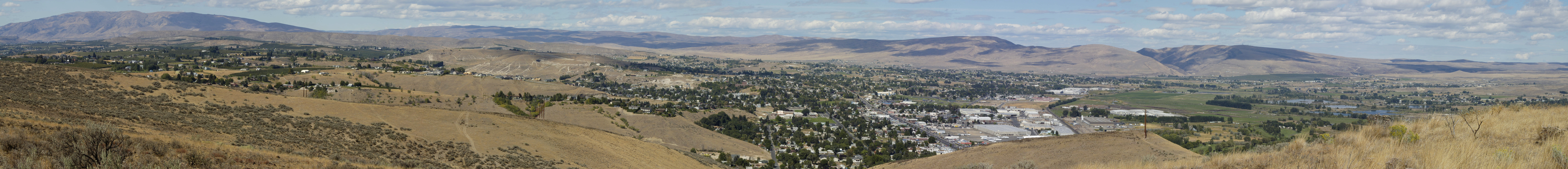
Selah, Washington viewed from Lookout Point.

== Geography ==
Selah is directly north of Yakima and is bordered to the south by the Naches River and to the east by the Yakima River. The Yakima River passes through the Selah Gap, which is also traversed by Interstate 82 and a railroad. According to the United States Census Bureau, the city has a total area of 4.52 square miles (11.71 km^{2}), of which, 4.44 square miles (11.50 km^{2}) is land and 0.08 square miles (0.21 km^{2}) is water.

Each Memorial Day weekend, the Washington State chapter of the National Audubon Society holds a campout some 22 miles north of Selah at the Hazel Wolf Bird Sanctuary in the upper Wenas Valley near Wenas, Washington. The upper valley also holds Wenas Lake, an irrigation reservoir. Wenas Creek flows from the reservoir through the agricultural lower Wenas Valley. This is where the Wenas Creek Mammoth was found. The creek is a tributary of the Yakima River.

=== Climate ===
This region experiences hot and dry summers, with no average monthly temperatures above 71.6 °F. According to the Köppen Climate Classification system, Selah has a Semi-arid climate, abbreviated "BSk" on climate maps.

Climate data for Selah, Washington (1991–2020 normals, extremes 1998–present)
Month	Jan	Feb	Mar	Apr	May	Jun	Jul	Aug	Sep	Oct	Nov	Dec	Year
Record high °F (°C)	62 (17)	66 (19)	79 (26)	87 (31)	99 (37)	105 (41)	109 (43)	104 (40)	101 (38)	88 (31)	70 (21)	61 (16)	109 (43)
Mean maximum °F (°C)	53.5 (11.9)	58.7 (14.8)	69.0 (20.6)	78.6 (25.9)	89.0 (31.7)	95.7 (35.4)	101.6 (38.7)	100.5 (38.1)	92.4 (33.6)	78.2 (25.7)	64.5 (18.1)	52.9 (11.6)	102.6 (39.2)
Mean daily maximum °F (°C)	37.4 (3.0)	45.4 (7.4)	54.2 (12.3)	62.4 (16.9)	71.8 (22.1)	78.5 (25.8)	87.8 (31.0)	87.2 (30.7)	78.0 (25.6)	63.5 (17.5)	47.8 (8.8)	36.5 (2.5)	62.5 (16.9)
Daily mean °F (°C)	29.5 (−1.4)	34.5 (1.4)	41.3 (5.2)	48.2 (9.0)	57.2 (14.0)	63.5 (17.5)	70.9 (21.6)	69.7 (20.9)	61.0 (16.1)	48.9 (9.4)	37.1 (2.8)	28.8 (−1.8)	49.2 (9.6)
Mean daily minimum °F (°C)	21.6 (−5.8)	23.7 (−4.6)	28.4 (−2.0)	34.1 (1.2)	42.7 (5.9)	48.4 (9.1)	54.0 (12.2)	52.3 (11.3)	44.0 (6.7)	34.4 (1.3)	26.4 (−3.1)	21.1 (−6.1)	35.9 (2.2)
Mean minimum °F (°C)	7.8 (−13.4)	11.7 (−11.3)	18.6 (−7.4)	22.9 (−5.1)	28.7 (−1.8)	36.9 (2.7)	43.6 (6.4)	42.3 (5.7)	32.9 (0.5)	22.3 (−5.4)	13.7 (−10.2)	8.0 (−13.3)	1.4 (−17.0)
Record low °F (°C)	−14 (−26)	−5 (−21)	5 (−15)	18 (−8)	20 (−7)	33 (1)	37 (3)	29 (−2)	25 (−4)	5 (−15)	−6 (−21)	−7 (−22)	−14 (−26)
Average precipitation inches (mm)	1.07 (27)	0.72 (18)	0.68 (17)	0.65 (17)	0.85 (22)	0.78 (20)	0.23 (5.8)	0.16 (4.1)	0.28 (7.1)	0.73 (19)	0.92 (23)	1.36 (35)	8.43 (214)
Average precipitation days (≥ 0.01 in)	9.5	7.4	7.3	5.9	7.8	5.5	2.1	2.4	3.1	7.5	9.9	11.5	79.9
Source: NOAA

== Economy ==
The Tree Top apple processor co-operative (established in 1960) has its headquarters and two processing plants in Selah. In 2004, the Yakama Tribe bought the old Hi-Country juicing plant, which it operated until 2010. The facility is owned and operated by Sun-Rype, the U.S. arm of Western Canada's largest juice and fruit snack distributor. It continues to produce store brand apple juice and other beverages. In addition a number of fruit companies have warehouses there, due to the proximity of fruit orchards in the nearby Wenas Valley and access to regional railroad and roadway systems for shipment to markets.

Selah and the Wenas Valley increasingly serve as a "bedroom community" of the larger city of Yakima to the south. Because of the nearby orchards and juice processing plants, Selah is often referred to as "The Apple Juice Capital of the World".

== Demographics ==
Historical population
Census	Pop.	Note	%±
1930	767		—
1940	1,130		47.3%
1950	2,489		120.3%
1960	2,824		13.5%
1970	3,311		17.2%
1980	4,500		35.9%
1990	5,113		13.6%
2000	6,310		23.4%
2010	7,147		13.3%
2020	8,153		14.1%
2021 (est.)	8,208		0.7%
U.S. Decennial Census; 2020 Census

=== 2020 census ===
As of the 2020 census, Selah had a population of 8,153. The median age was 33.2 years. 27.8% of residents were under the age of 18 and 12.2% of residents were 65 years of age or older. For every 100 females there were 95.8 males, and for every 100 females age 18 and over there were 92.7 males age 18 and over.

97.0% of residents lived in urban areas, while 3.0% lived in rural areas.

There were 3,007 households in Selah, of which 41.5% had children under the age of 18 living in them. Of all households, 48.0% were married-couple households, 17.0% were households with a male householder and no spouse or partner present, and 25.0% were households with a female householder and no spouse or partner present. About 22.3% of all households were made up of individuals and 8.6% had someone living alone who was 65 years of age or older.

There were 3,072 housing units, of which 2.1% were vacant. The homeowner vacancy rate was 0.5% and the rental vacancy rate was 2.2%.

Racial composition as of the 2020 census
Race	Number	Percent
White	5,960	73.1%
Black or African American	82	1.0%
American Indian and Alaska Native	111	1.4%
Asian	118	1.4%
Native Hawaiian and Other Pacific Islander	9	0.1%
Some other race	970	11.9%
Two or more races	903	11.1%
Hispanic or Latino (of any race)	1,923	23.6%

=== 2010 census ===
As of the 2010 census, there were 7,147 people, 2,658 households, and 1,861 families living in the city. The population density was 1,609.7 inhabitants per square mile (621.5/km^{2}). There were 2,759 housing units at an average density of 621.4 per square mile (239.9/km^{2}). The racial makeup of the city was 85.8% White, 0.5% African American, 1.3% Native American, 0.7% Asian, 0.2% Pacific Islander, 8.4% from other races, and 3.1% from two or more races. Hispanic or Latino of any race were 16.4% of the population.

There were 2,658 households, of which 42.6% had children under the age of 18 living with them, 47.2% were married couples living together, 17.2% had a female householder with no husband present, 5.6% had a male householder with no wife present, and 30.0% were non-families. 24.0% of all households were made up of individuals, and 8.6% had someone living alone who was 65 years of age or older. The average household size was 2.64 and the average family size was 3.12.

The median age in the city was 31.5 years. 29.6% of residents were under the age of 18; 9.5% were between the ages of 18 and 24; 27.9% were from 25 to 44; 22.8% were from 45 to 64; and 10.1% were 65 years of age or older. The gender makeup of the city was 48.2% male and 51.8% female.

== Infrastructure ==
=== Transportation ===
Selah is served by Interstate 82, a major freeway that traverses the Yakima Valley and connects with Interstate 90 in Ellensburg. The city is also bisected by State Route 823, a short highway that connects to U.S. Route 12 in Yakima. A freight railroad owned by the BNSF Railway travels through Selah towards the Yakima River Canyon.

The city government funds and manages Selah Transit, a small public transit system with two routes that are operated by MedStar Transportation, a contractor. It is funded by a 0.3 percent sales tax that was approved by voters in 2007 and created the system, which began service in 2009. Selah Transit also connects with Yakima Transit, a separate municipal system that had operated Selah's buses under contract until 2018. The system carried 4,663 total passenger trips on its bus routes and 2,724 on paratransit in 2023.
