= Umtanum Ridge =

Mountain ridge in the United States

Coordinates: 46°41′7″N 120°10′50″W

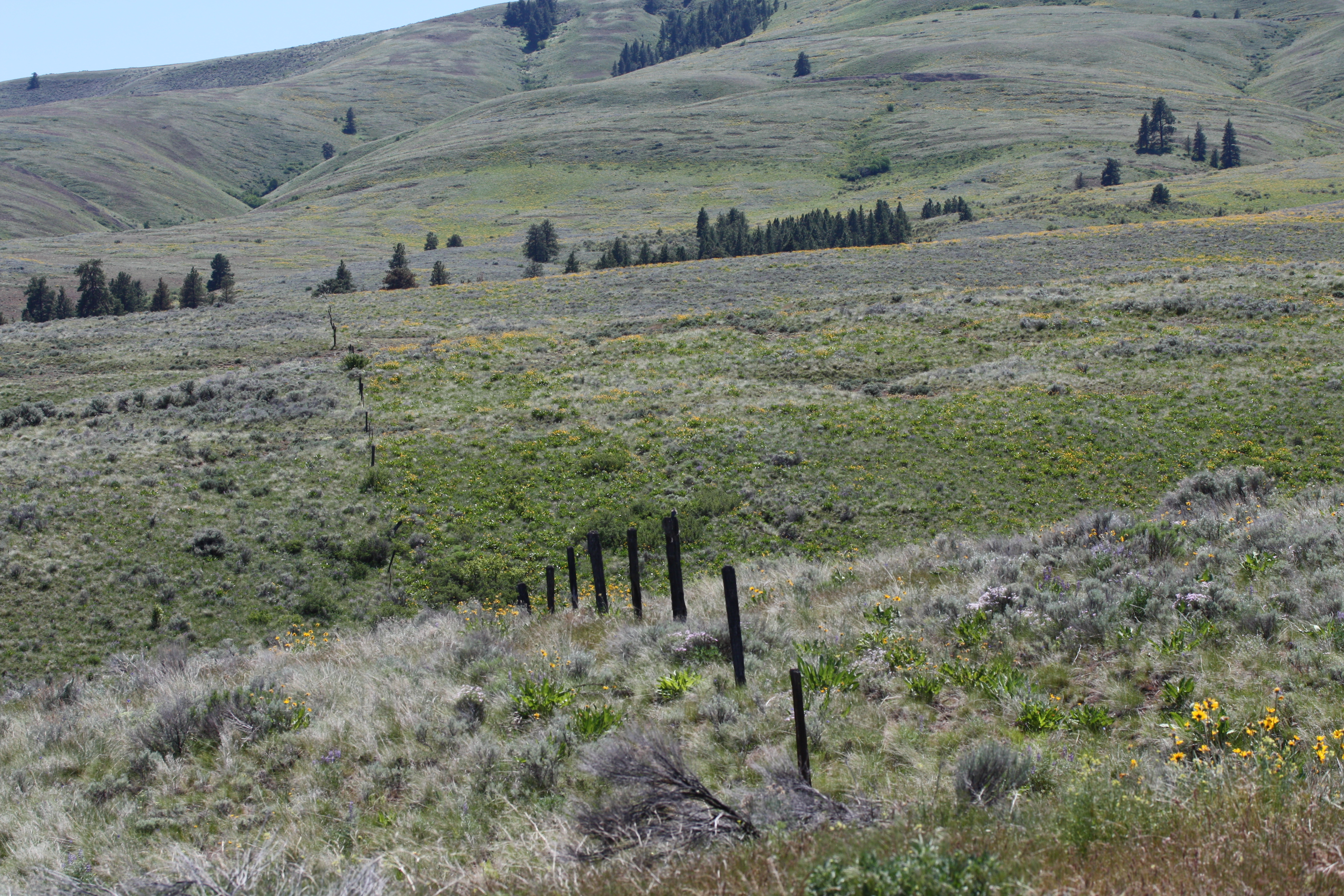
View south of the north slope of Umtanum Ridge

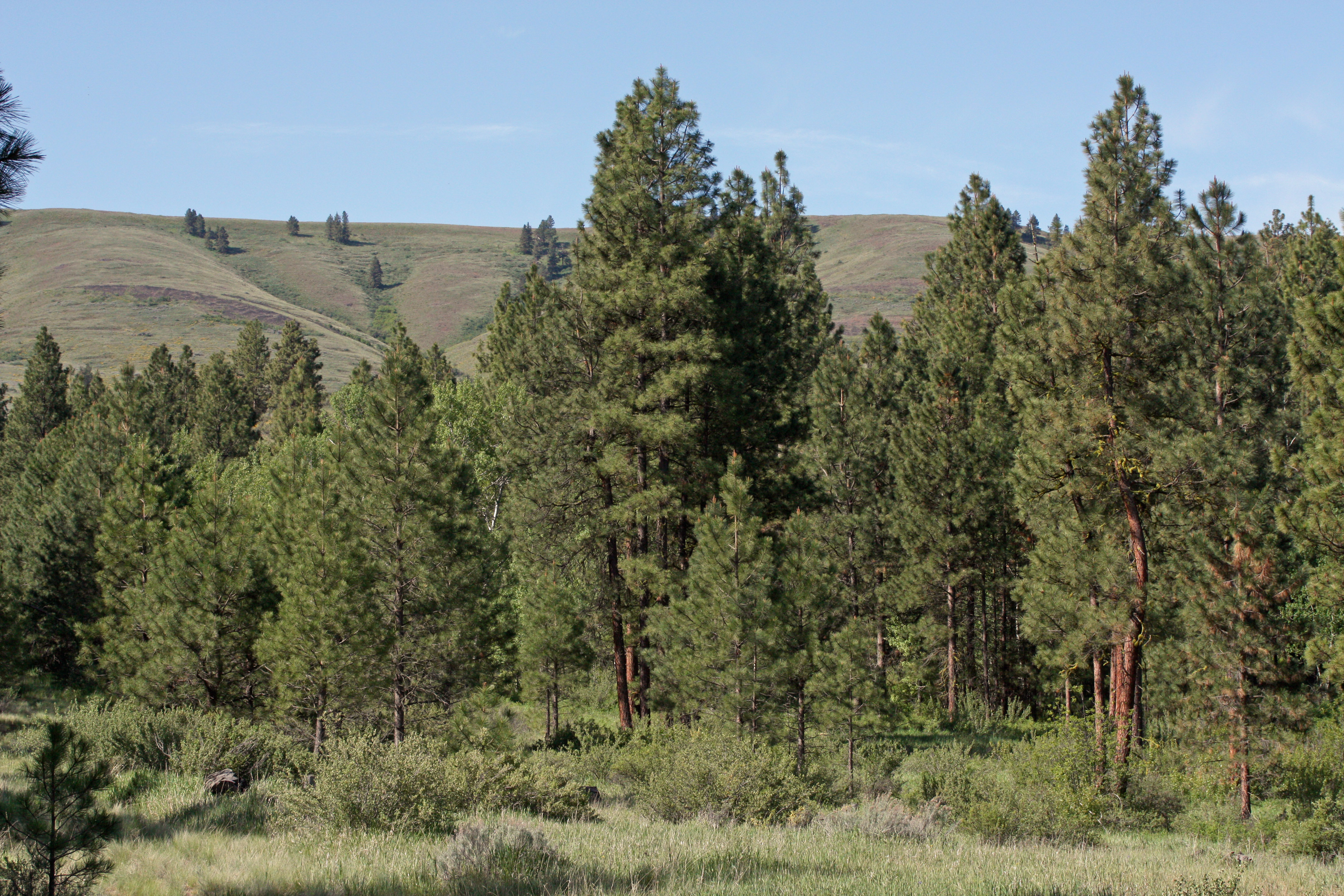
Ponderosa pine grow along seasonal streams.

Umtanum Ridge is a long anticline mountain ridge in Yakima County and Kittitas County in the U.S. state of Washington.

== Coverage ==
It runs for approximately 55 miles east-southeast from the Cascade Range, through the Yakima Training Center to the edge of the Columbia River at Priest Rapids Dam and Hanford Reach. The eastern end of Umtanum Ridge enters Hanford Reach National Monument and the Hanford Site. Umtanum Ridge is paralleled on the north by Manastash Ridge and on the south by Yakima Ridge. The Yakima River cuts through the ridge at the Umtanum Ridge Water Gap.

== Name origin ==
The name Umtanum comes from Sahaptin, probably /ɨmtanam/, possibly meaning "taste" or "mouth full", from the root /ɨm/, "mouth".

== Description ==
Umtanum Ridge is part of the Yakima Fold Belt of east-tending long ridges formed by the folding of Miocene Columbia River basalt flows.
