= Selah Gap =

Coordinates: 46°38′13″N 120°31′35″W

Selah Gap is a water gap carved by the Yakima River through the Yakima Ridge basalt formation between Yakima, Washington and Selah, Washington. The gap is traversed by BNSF Railway, Interstate 82, and Washington State Route 823. The Yakima Greenway trail for non motorized users also crosses the Yakima River at Selah Gap on an 1884 railroad bridge. The William O. Douglas Trail, named for William O. Douglas who hiked there from his home in Yakima, also crosses the gap and ascends the ridge on its way to Mount Rainier.
