= Yakima Valley Transportation Company =

Railroad in Yakima, Washington, US

Overview
- Headquarters: Yakima, Washington
- Yakima Valley Transportation Company
- U.S. National Register of Historic Places
- U.S. Historic district
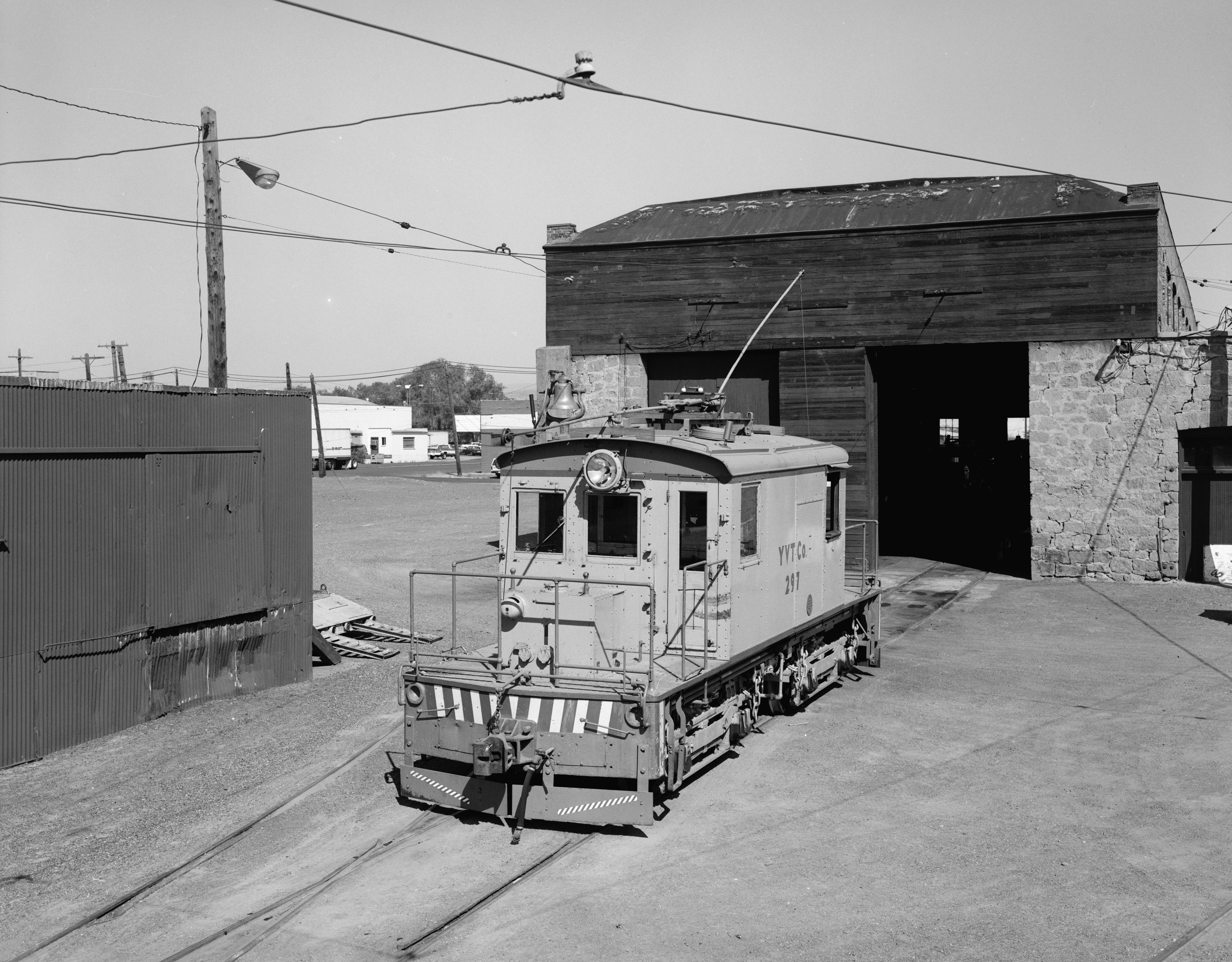
- Yakima Valley Transportation Company boxcab electric locomotive #297.
- Location: Third Ave. and Pine St., Yakima, Washington
- Area: 50 acres (20.2 ha)
- Built: 1907
- Built by: Multiple
- NRHP reference No.: 84004012
- Added to NRHP: October 8, 1992
- Reporting mark: YVT
- Locale: Washington
- Dates of operation: 1907–1985

Technical
- Track gauge: 4 ft 8 1/2 in (1,435 mm) standard gauge
- Electrification: 600 V DC trolley wire

The Yakima Valley Transportation Company (YVT Co.) was an interurban electric railroad headquartered in Yakima, Washington. It was operator of the city's streetcar system from 1907–1947, and it also provided the local bus service from the 1920s until 1957.

== Early history ==
YVT Company began operations in 1907 as a streetcar line downtown, opened on December 25. Although some freight operation took place almost from the beginning, streetcar service was the company's primary activity for its first several years, and interurban service was extended to several new areas through new construction. A line west to Ahtanum and the area that would eventually be known as Wiley City was completed in 1910, as was the first part of a line to Henrybro. A line north to Selah and Speyers was completed in 1913. The distances from Yakima on the western lines to Wiley City and Henrybro were 9.2 miles and 9.7 miles, respectively, while the distance from Yakima to Selah on the north line was 4.8 miles.

From 1909 onward, the company was a wholly owned subsidiary of the Union Pacific Railroad (originally through the Oregon Railway & Navigation Company), and the freight division functioned as a feeder service to the UP main line. Freight service expanded in the 1910s, and by 1920 it had become a major function of the YVT. Interurban service was discontinued on May 15, 1935.

== Local transit service ==
The Yakima Valley Transportation Company operated the local streetcar system from 1907 until 1947 and was the only entity ever to operate streetcars in Yakima (not counting the limited heritage streetcar service which began operation in the 1970s). The first streetcars purchased new came from the Danville Car Company (of Danville, Illinois), while later purchases were from the John G. Stephenson Company (Elizabeth, New Jersey) and the J. G. Brill Company (Philadelphia). YVT began experimenting with buses in the 1920s, and in 1926 the company sought permission from the city to replace all streetcar service with buses, but the request was denied. In later years, ridership on the streetcars declined, and automobiles proliferated, creating congestion in downtown.

Streetcar service operated for the last time on February 1, 1947. YVT continued operating the local bus service until 1957, under a 10-year franchise it had received from the city in 1947. The city itself took over the bus service in 1957, which has since become Yakima Transit.

== Freight-only period ==
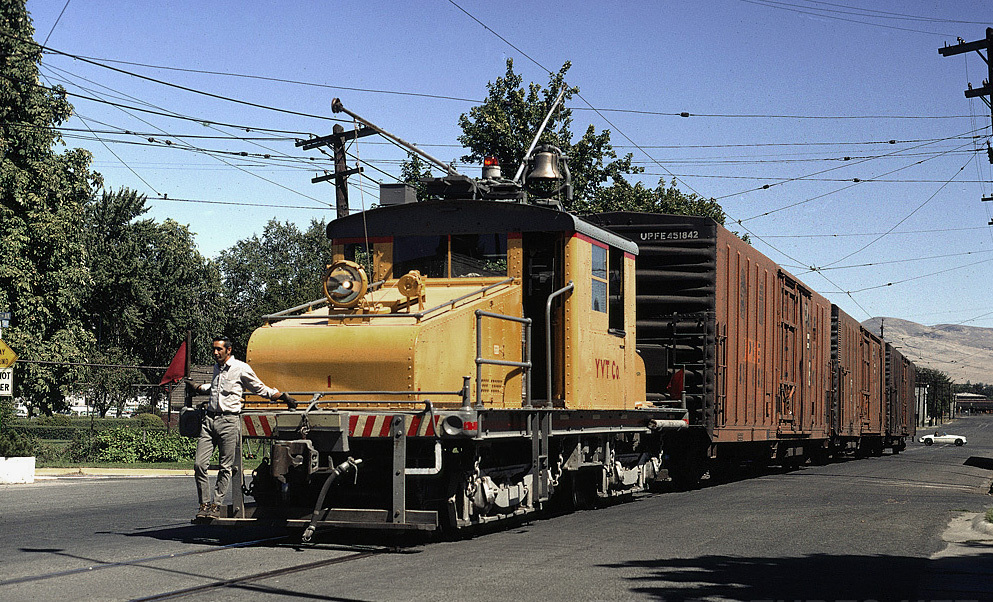
GE steeplecab locomotive #298 hauling a YVT train on Pine Street in 1971.

The YVT railroad, however, continued operating for many more years, as a freight-only operation feeding the Union Pacific main line. In the 1970s, the city reached agreement with YVT/UP to allow a then-proposed heritage streetcar operation to use the tracks and overhead trolley wires of the railroad. This began operation in 1974, with volunteers from a new non-profit organization named Yakima Valley Interurban Lines (replaced in 2001 by Yakima Valley Trolleys), and continues to the present day (as of 2010), on a reduced scale.

Due to declining revenue, Union Pacific filed for abandonment of the YVT on April 26, 1984, and this was approved by the Interstate Commerce Commission on June 5, 1985. Operation ceased on November 18, 1985. However, at the request of city officials, Union Pacific donated the entire railroad to the City of Yakima, to allow continued operation of the heritage streetcar service by the Yakima Valley Trolleys, a 501(c)(3) volunteer-run non-profit organization. The donation included two of the railway's three locomotives, 1909 "Line car" A (for overhead line maintenance) and 1922 GE "steeple-cab" locomotive No. 298. The third YVT electric locomotive, 1923 boxcab-type No. 297, was donated by UP to the Orange Empire Railway Museum (now known as the Southern California Railway Museum), and left Yakima for that museum (on a railroad flatcar) the day after the YVT closed. UP retained ownership of the stone carbarn, on Pine Street, but agreed to lease it to the city for only $100 per year. The YVT was one of the last freight railroads in North America to use trolley poles on its locomotives, never having changed to pantographs.^{1}

== See also ==
- Spokane and Inland Empire Railroad
- Yakima Electric Railway Museum

== Notes ==
- ^1. The Iowa Traction Railroad, founded in 1896–1897 (under a different name) and still operating, is another North American electric freight railroad that did not abandon the use of trolley poles.
