= Yakima Training Center =

US Army range in Washington state

Coordinates: 46°45′40″N 120°11′29″W

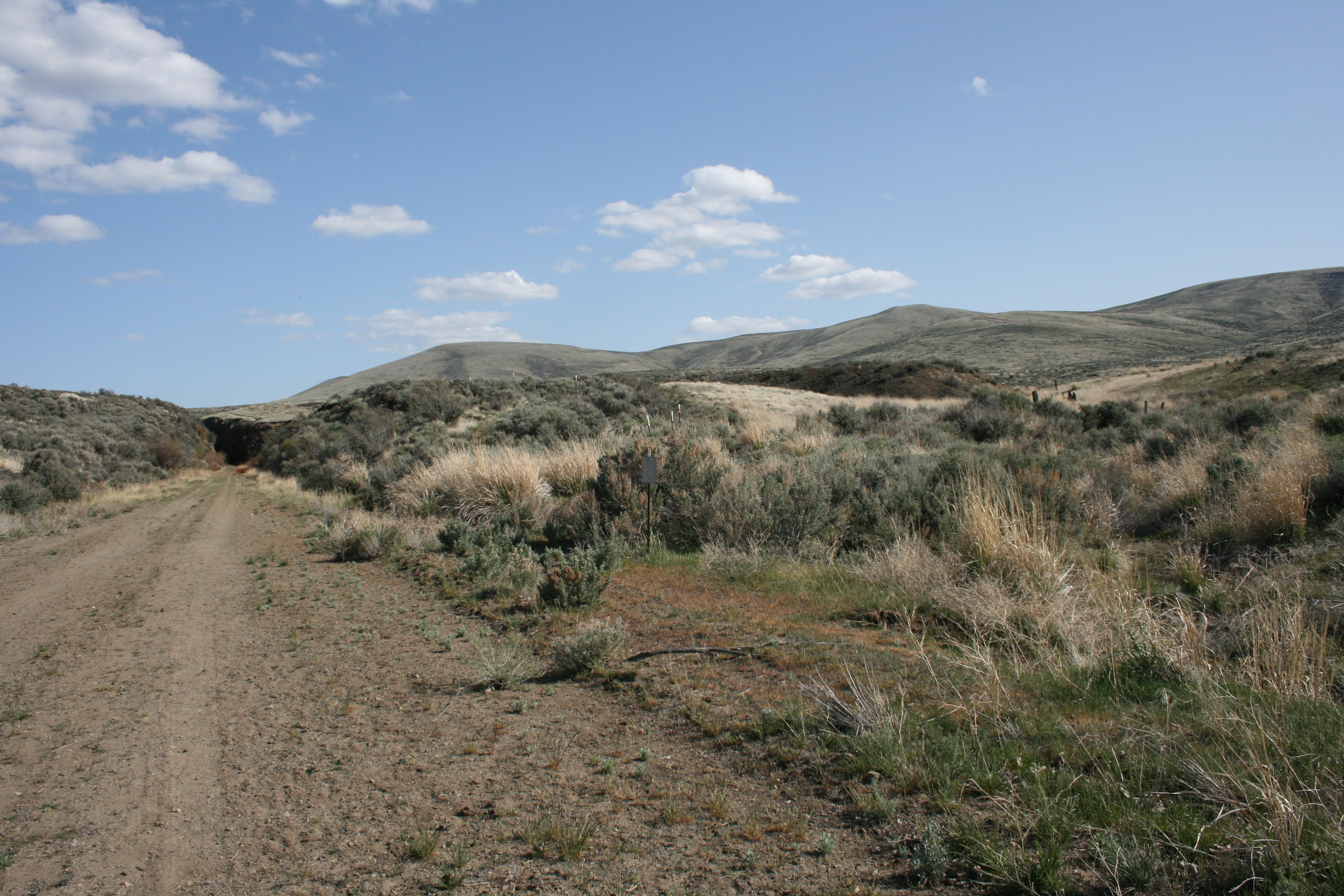
The Saddle Mountains on the Yakima Training Center as seen from the John Wayne Pioneer Trail. Photo looking east southeasterly at Boylston tunnel.

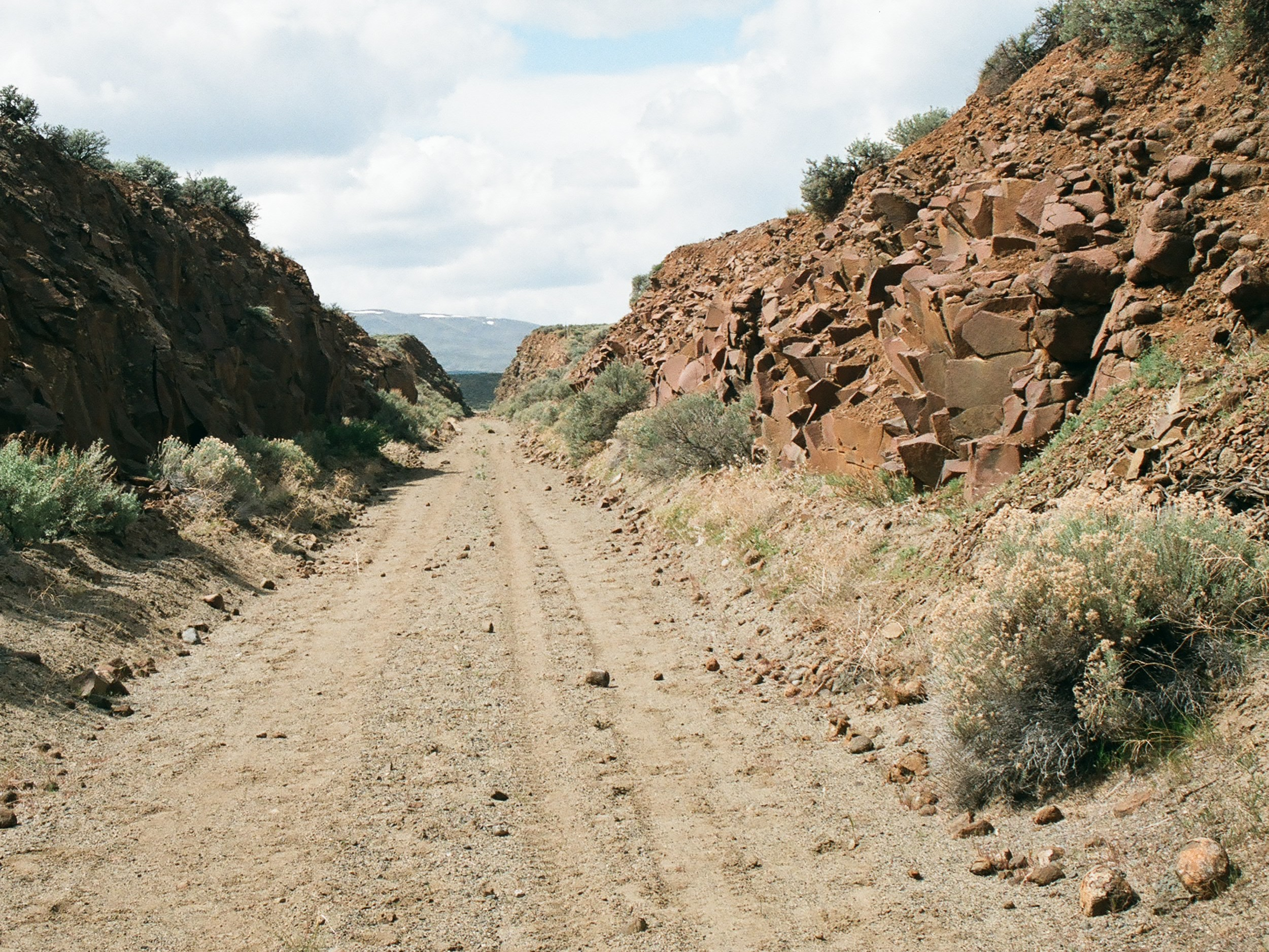
Rail cut on the Yakima Training Center in the eastern end of the Iron Horse State Park portion of the John Wayne Pioneer Trail as it nears the Columbia River south of Vantage

The Yakima Training Center (YTC) is a United States Army training center, used for maneuver training, Land Warrior system testing and as a live fire exercise area. It is located in the south central portion of the U.S. state of Washington, bounded on the west by Interstate 82, on the south by the city of Yakima, on the north by the city of Ellensburg and Interstate 90, and on the east by the Columbia River. It is a part of Joint Base Lewis-McChord. It comprises 327,000 acres (132,332 hectares) of land, most of which consists of shrub-steppe, making it one of the largest areas of shrub-steppe habitat remaining in Washington state. The terrain is undulating and dominated by three east-west parallel ridges, the Saddle Mountains, Manastash Ridge, and Umtanum Ridge anticlines, which are part of the Yakima Fold Belt near the western edge of the Columbia River Plateau. Vegetation consists of sagebrush, bitterbrush, and bunch grass. Vagabond Army Airfield and Selah Airstrip are located on the Yakima Training Center. The training center is also used by the Japan Ground Self-Defense Force for exercises.

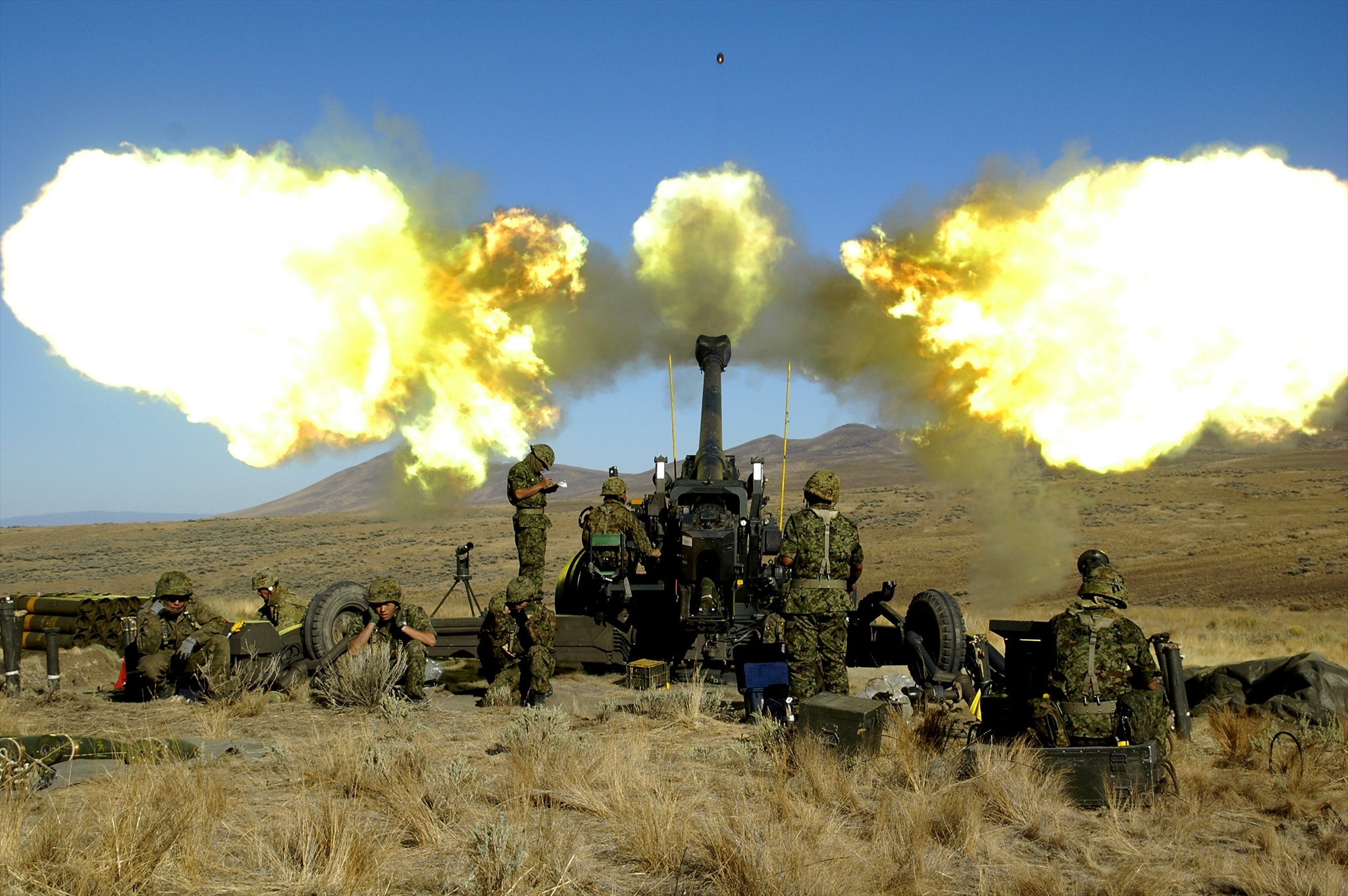
Japan Self-Defense Force

== History ==
From 1942 to 1946 the U.S. Army leased 160,000 acres (650 km^{2}) of land in the area for the Yakima Anti-Aircraft Artillery Range. Then in 1951 the Army purchased 261,000 acres (1,060 km^{2}) for the Yakima Firing Center, which would become the modern Yakima Training Center.

The United States Army identified a need for a large maneuver area in the Pacific Northwest and appointed a board of officers to negotiate with local landowners to lease 160,000 acres in the Yakima area. In 1941, just prior to World War II, military units in the Pacific Northwest began using the Yakima Anti-Aircraft Artillery Range for range firing and small unit tests; and in 1942 the first temporary buildings were constructed on Umptanum Ridge about eight miles northeast of the current cantonment area. During the latter part of 1942 and 1943, another camp was built in the location of the present cantonment area and was named the Yakima Firing Center. The 9th Service Command assumed control of the Yakima Firing Center and supported training for numerous Army Reserve and National Guard infantry, artillery, and engineer units through the remainder of World War II.

The Army decided to enlarge the Yakima Firing Center because of increasing training requirements and its future potential. In 1951, the Army bought 261,198 acres at a cost of $3.3 million. Throughout the 1950s and 1960s, Yakima Firing Center supported training activities and exercises for Fort Lewis units and the Washington Army National Guard. These exercises ranged up to division level and included major exercises named Hilltop, Applejack, and Cooly Crest. In 1965 the United States Marine Corps conducted Operation Yakima Attack, which was a joint air/ground exercise of the type that illustrates the true value of Yakima Firing Center as a maneuver training area.

During the Vietnam War era, Yakima Firing Center was used almost exclusively for U.S. Army Reserve and Army National Guard training; Fort Lewis had become a training center and no longer housed a division. However, in 1971 the 9th Infantry Division was activated at Fort Lewis, and in 1974 their first divisional exercise, Bold Fire, marked the return of the active Army to Yakima Firing Center. Users of the Yakima Firing Center continued to grow over the next several years.

The single largest exercise ever conducted at Yakima Firing Center occurred in 1976, when 6,000 active, reserve, and National Guard, and sister services converged on the installation for Joint Training Exercise Brave Shield.

Throughout the 1970s and 1980s, the 9th Division and the Washington Army National Guard trained extensively on the installation. They conducted tank gunner, extensive maneuver exercises and tests. New equipment was frequently tested at Yakima Firing Center because of its rugged, austere conditions. The new equipment provided greater mobility and the new weapons had greater range, so the Army determined that more area was required.

In 1987, actions began that resulted in the acquisition of more than 63,000 acres at a cost of $18 million following congressional approval in 1992. During this period, other major changes occurred for Yakima Firing Center. The 9th Infantry Division deactivated at Fort Lewis, and a brigade from the 7th Infantry Division moved in; construction of the Multi-Purpose Range Complex was completed in 1988 and it opened for business in July 1989, and the Yakima Firing Center was renamed the YAKIMA TRAINING CENTER in 1990. The new name more accurately described the mission and capability of the installation.

The force structure at Fort Lewis continued to change, and the stationing of three Stryker brigades from the 2nd Infantry Division, 1 Artillery and ADA Brigade and a Battlefield Surveillance Brigade once again increased training levels at Yakima Training Center.

Major improvements to the installation increased its capability to support training. Another major range project, the Multi-Purpose Training Range, was completed; 250 miles of high quality road were constructed; a state-of-the-art Wash Rack facility, a new fuel facility, and an expanded Ammunition Supply Point enhanced the expanded maneuver area.

Yakima Training Center provides training support for transient units and organizations by sustaining training lands, range complexes, and support facilities in order to enhance readiness. The installation's customers include not only the Joint Base Lewis-McChord and Army National Guard units, but also U.S. Special Operations Command, Marine Corps, Air Force, Navy, and Coast Guard units, plus local and federal law enforcement agencies and allied forces from Canada and Japan.

Decades of use of fire-suppressant foam containing PFAS contaminated groundwater around the center, requiring water filtration in East Selah, Washington.

== National Security Agency ==
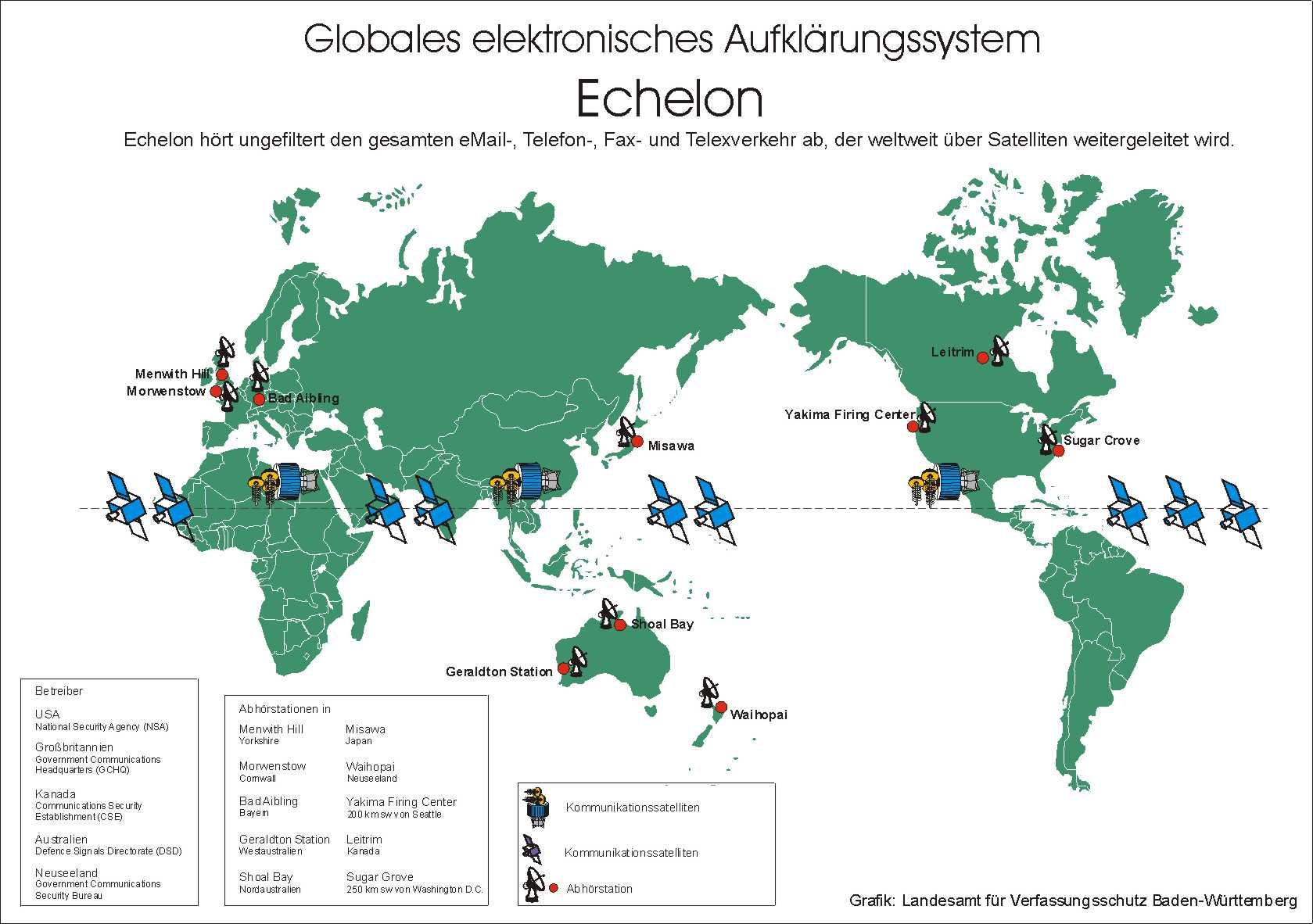
Yakima is marked in this German map of Echelon, published by the German State Authority for the Protection of the Constitution in a 1998 report.

In addition to its role as a training facility, the Yakima facility has been asserted to play a major role in ECHELON, the global surveillance network operated by Five Eyes. The SIGINT portion of the facility is referred to as Yakima Research Station. The small Yakima intercept station remains an important means of intercepting COMINT passing through the plethora of Intelsat and other international communications satellites orbiting geosynchronously above the earth.

In April 2013, the Yakima Herald reported that the Yakima Research Station was going to be shut down at some unspecified time in the future with its function moving to a facility in Colorado. The office of Congressman Doc Hastings, in whose district the facility is located, was notified by the NSA in summer 2012 that the facility was going to be shut down. This was subsequently confirmed, with the Navy posting an OPNAV notice of closure. The functions of the facilities will be moved to the Aerospace Data Facility at Buckley Space Force Base in Colorado and result in the loss of 100 or more jobs from the Yakima area. According to James Bamford, the facility's focus on satellite communications led to its closure. "That's history now", said Bamford in 2013. "Cyberspace and [supercomputers] are the frontier."
