= Yakima Electric Railway Museum =

Transport museum in Yakima, Washington, United States

Coordinates: 46.595469°N 120.510347°W

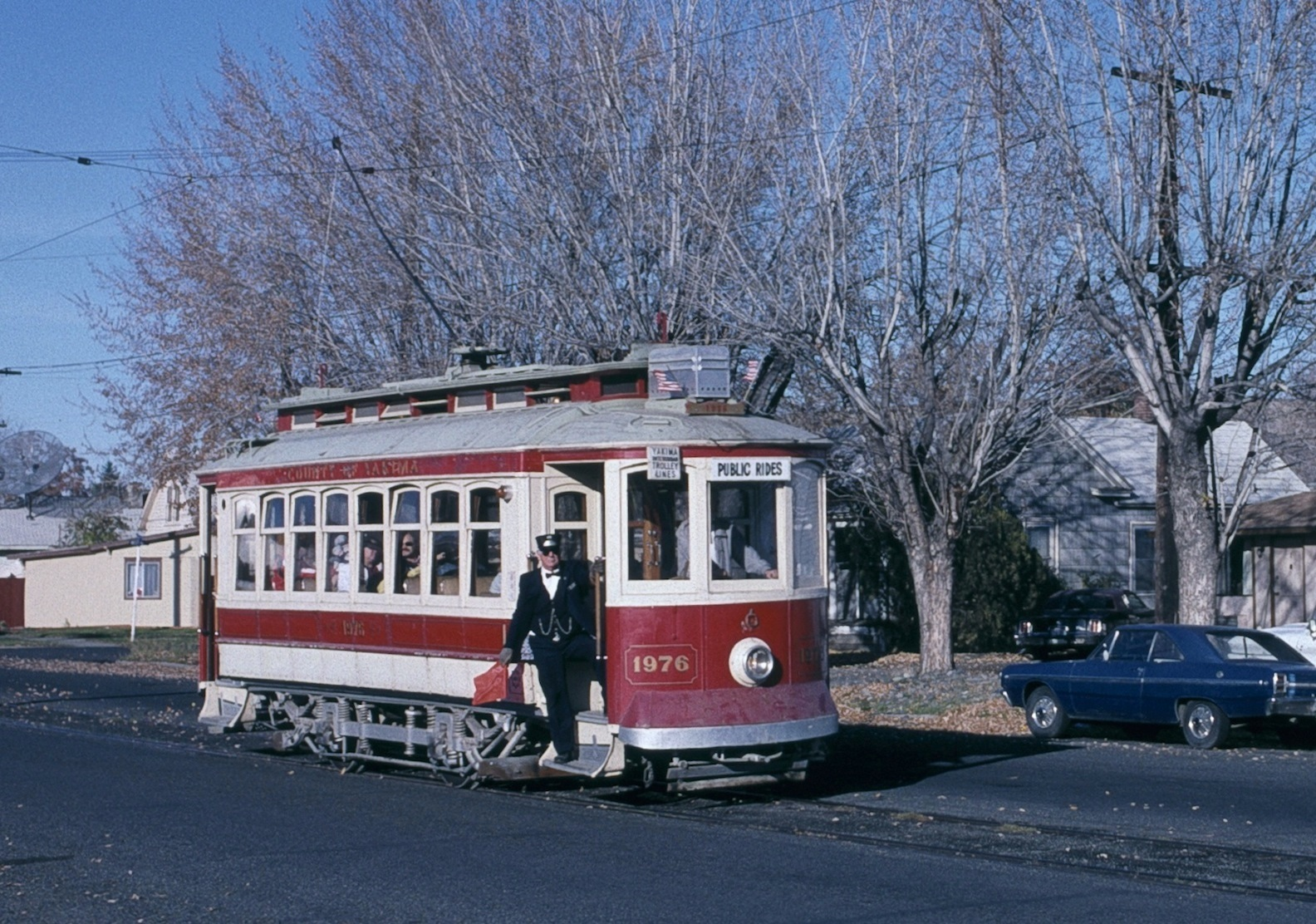
One of the Yakima Electric Railway Museum's trolleys in service in 1989

Yakima Electric Railway Museum is a railroad museum and former heritage streetcar operator in Yakima, Washington, United States. It is located at the corner of South Third Avenue and Pine Street.

The museum is operated by Yakima Valley Trolleys, a non-profit organization. Vintage trolleys operate on a seasonal schedule on some of the original tracks of the Yakima Valley Transportation Company, which ceased passenger operations in 1985. The City of Yakima owns the trolleys and tracks, which were donated by the former operator. The fleet consists of two identical cars built in 1928–1929 by Oporto's streetcar company on Brill designs — whimsically renumbered №1776 (former STCP 260) and №1976 (former STCP 254). as well as rolling stock from the Yakima Valley Transportation Company.

Entrance to the museum is free, but there is a fare for the trolley ride. The section that extends north to Selah was closed in 2023 due to the discovery of structural issues on the route's bridge over the Naches River. The system was placed on the Most Endangered Places list by the Washington Trust for Historic Preservation in 2025 due to plans by the city government to repave 6th Avenue, where the trolleys run. On December 31, 2025, the operating agreement between Yakima Valley Trolleys and the Yakima city government expired and the service was suspended. Service was resumed in January 2026 with a new agreement that currently lasts to 2030. The city council voted in July 2026 to remove funding for repairs to the Naches River Bridge deemed necessary to continue operating the Naches route.
