= Ellensburg, Washington =

City in Washington, United States

- City
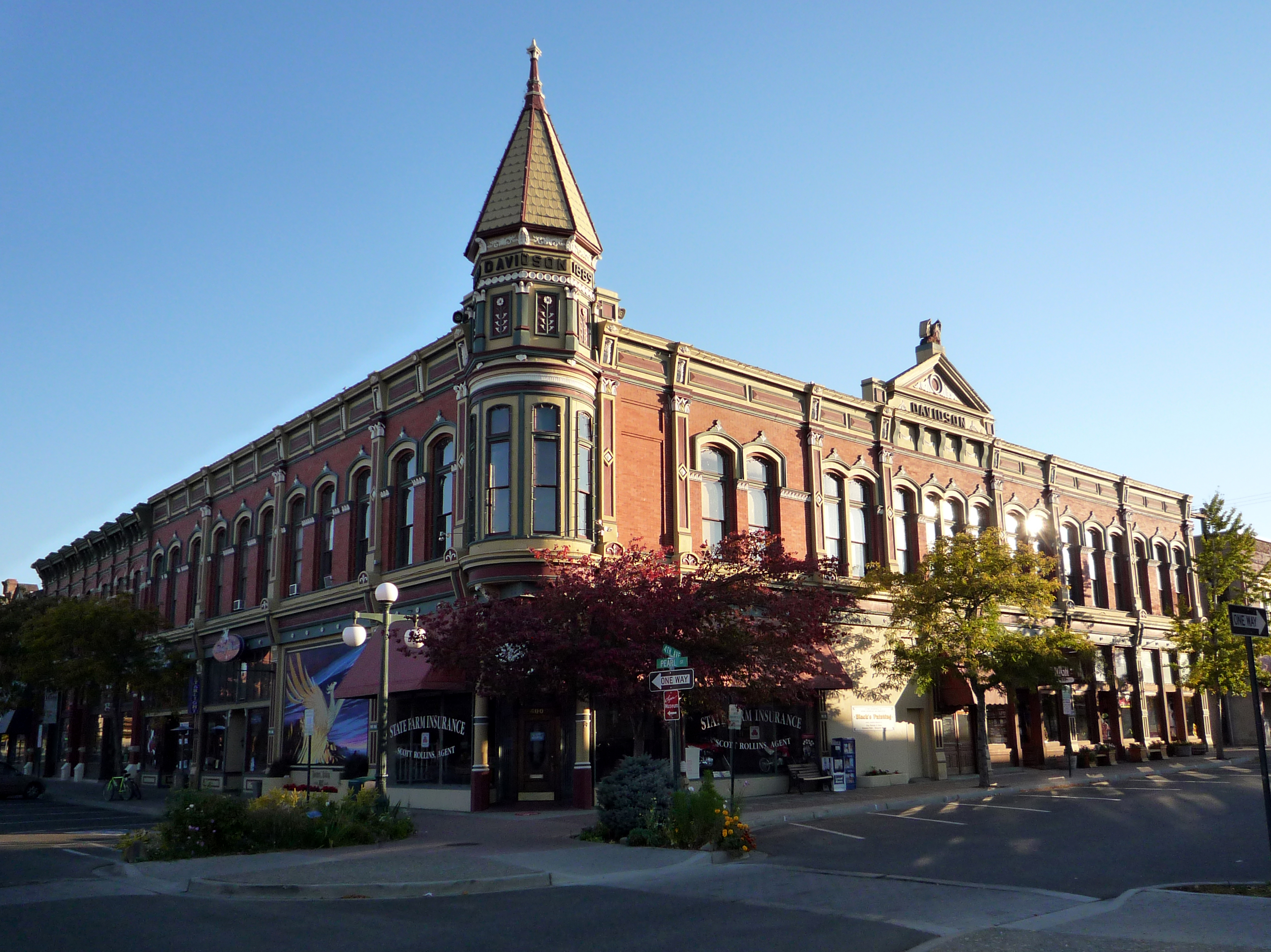
- The historic Davidson Building, completed in 1890

- Seal

- Location of Ellensburg, Washington
- Coordinates: 47°00′01″N 120°32′48″W
- Country: United States
- State: Washington
- County: Kittitas
- Incorporated: November 26, 1883

Government
  - Type: Council–manager
  - Mayor: Rich Elliott
  - City Manager: Heidi Behrends Cerniwey

Area
  - City: 8.43 sq mi (21.83 km^{2})
  - Land: 8.32 sq mi (21.55 km^{2})
  - Water: 0.10 sq mi (0.27 km^{2})
- Elevation: 1,565 ft (477 m)

Population (2020)
  - City: 18,666
  - Estimate (2024): 20,996
  - Density: 2,248/sq mi (867.9/km^{2})
  - Urban: 21,518
  - Urban density: 2,434/sq mi (939.9/km^{2})
  - Metro: 45,189 (US: 266th)
  - Metro density: 19,670/sq mi (7,595/km^{2})
- Time zone: UTC–8 (Pacific (PST))
  - Summer (DST): UTC–7 (PDT)
- ZIP Code: 98926
- Area code: 509
- FIPS code: 53-21240
- GNIS feature ID: 2410430
- Website: ci.ellensburg.wa.us

Ellensburg is a city in and the county seat of Kittitas County, Washington, United States. It is located just east of the Cascade Range near the junction of Interstate 90 and Interstate 82. The population was 18,666 at the 2020 census, and was estimated to be 20,996 in 2024.

The city is located along the Yakima River in the Kittitas Valley, an agricultural region that extends east towards the Columbia River. The valley is a major producer of timothy hay, which is processed and shipped internationally. Ellensburg is also the home of Central Washington University (CWU).

Ellensburg, originally named Ellensburgh for the wife of town founder John Alden Shoudy, was founded in 1871 and grew rapidly in the 1880s following the arrival of the Northern Pacific Railway. The city was once a leading candidate to become the state capital of Washington, but its campaign was scuppered by a major fire in 1889.

== History ==
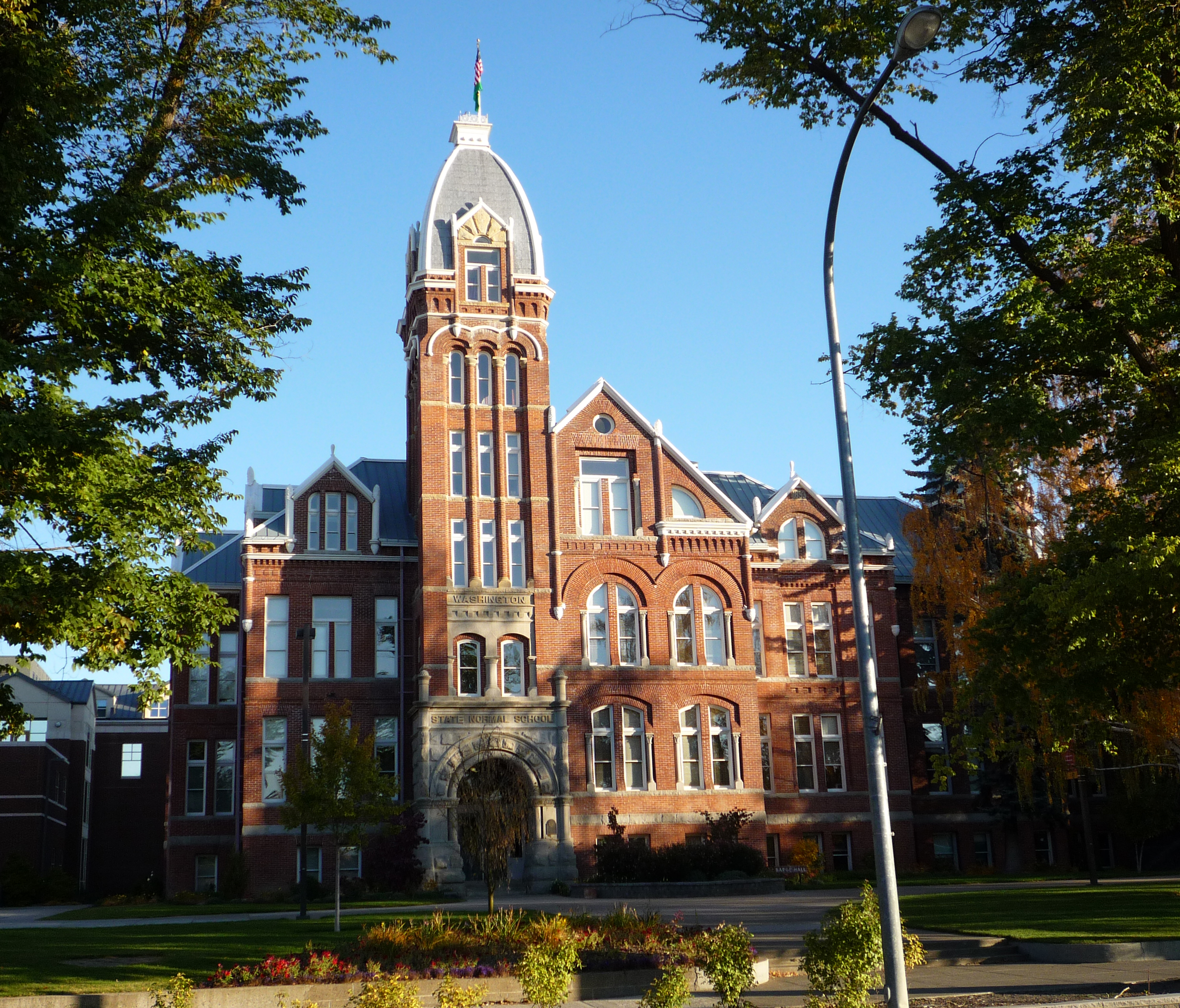
Barge Hall at Central Washington University

John Alden Shoudy arrived in the Kittitas Valley in 1871 and purchased a small trading post from Andrew Jackson "A.J." Splawn, called "Robber's Roost". Robber's Roost was the first business in the valley, aside from the early trading that occurred among Native Americans, cattle drivers, trappers, and miners. A small stone monument to Robber's Roost with a placard can be found at its original location, present-day 3rd Avenue, just west of Main Street near the alley.

Shoudy named the new town after his wife, Mary Ellen, thus officially starting the city of Ellensburgh around 1872. Shoudy had not been the first settler nor the first business person in the Kittitas Valley, but he was responsible for platting the city of Ellensburgh in the 1870s and also named the streets in the downtown district. Ellensburgh was officially incorporated on November 26, 1883. In 1894, the final -h was dropped under standardization pressure from the United States Postal Service and Board of Geography Names. Ellensburg was an early center of commerce in Washington and was among the first cities in the state to have electrical service.

The city launched a bid to become Washington state's capital in 1889, preparing a site in the Capital Hill neighborhood for government offices. On July 4 that year, however, a major fire destroyed much of the downtown area and stalled the campaign, which resumed with a series of referendums, in which Washington voters chose Olympia. The state legislature selected Ellensburg as the location for the State Normal School (now Central Washington University).

There were several early newspapers in Ellensburg. The Daily Record, which started in 1909, is the publication which serves the city and county today. Concerns over the state of Ellensburg's historic downtown led to the formation of the Ellensburg Downtown Association to work on revitalizing the area.

== Geography ==
Ellensburg lies in the Kittitas Valley east of the Cascade Mountains and at the edge of the Columbia Plateau. The Yakima River runs through the area and continues south into the Yakima River Canyon, which cuts through the Manastash Ridge. According to the United States Census Bureau, the city has a total area of 8.43 square miles (21.83 km^{2}), of which 8.32 square miles (21.55 km^{2}) is land and 0.11 square miles (0.28 km^{2}) is water.

=== Climate ===
Owing to the strong Cascade rain shadow, Ellensburg experiences a typical Intermountain cool semi-arid climate (Köppen BSk). The hottest temperature recorded in Ellensburg was 110 °F (43.3 °C) on July 26, 1928, while the coldest temperature recorded was −31 °F (−35.0 °C) on December 12, 1919.

Climate data for Ellensburg, Washington, 1991–2020 normals, extremes 1892–present
Month	Jan	Feb	Mar	Apr	May	Jun	Jul	Aug	Sep	Oct	Nov	Dec	Year
Record high °F (°C)	64 (18)	66 (19)	80 (27)	94 (34)	99 (37)	108 (42)	110 (43)	107 (42)	98 (37)	87 (31)	71 (22)	65 (18)	110 (43)
Mean maximum °F (°C)	60.7 (15.9)	61.6 (16.4)	69.4 (20.8)	77.4 (25.2)	88.0 (31.1)	95.2 (35.1)	102.6 (39.2)	101.0 (38.3)	92.6 (33.7)	80.0 (26.7)	66.5 (19.2)	59.9 (15.5)	104.2 (40.1)
Mean daily maximum °F (°C)	35.0 (1.7)	42.6 (5.9)	52.1 (11.2)	60.1 (15.6)	69.3 (20.7)	75.6 (24.2)	84.8 (29.3)	84.5 (29.2)	76.1 (24.5)	61.5 (16.4)	45.5 (7.5)	35.0 (1.7)	60.2 (15.7)
Daily mean °F (°C)	27.6 (−2.4)	32.5 (0.3)	39.8 (4.3)	46.9 (8.3)	55.7 (13.2)	61.9 (16.6)	69.2 (20.7)	68.2 (20.1)	59.8 (15.4)	47.5 (8.6)	35.7 (2.1)	27.7 (−2.4)	47.7 (8.7)
Mean daily minimum °F (°C)	20.2 (−6.6)	22.4 (−5.3)	27.6 (−2.4)	33.7 (0.9)	42.1 (5.6)	48.2 (9.0)	53.6 (12.0)	51.9 (11.1)	43.4 (6.3)	33.5 (0.8)	25.9 (−3.4)	20.3 (−6.5)	35.2 (1.8)
Mean minimum °F (°C)	11.7 (−11.3)	15.8 (−9.0)	23.1 (−4.9)	28.5 (−1.9)	33.5 (0.8)	41.2 (5.1)	47.2 (8.4)	46.0 (7.8)	37.8 (3.2)	25.7 (−3.5)	18.8 (−7.3)	12.1 (−11.1)	3.7 (−15.7)
Record low °F (°C)	−29 (−34)	−23 (−31)	−5 (−21)	14 (−10)	18 (−8)	30 (−1)	30 (−1)	29 (−2)	16 (−9)	9 (−13)	−17 (−27)	−31 (−35)	−31 (−35)
Average precipitation inches (mm)	1.19 (30)	0.82 (21)	0.80 (20)	0.63 (16)	0.81 (21)	0.55 (14)	0.31 (7.9)	0.18 (4.6)	0.33 (8.4)	0.82 (21)	1.10 (28)	1.45 (37)	8.99 (228.9)
Average snowfall inches (cm)	6.9 (18)	2.6 (6.6)	0.7 (1.8)	0.0 (0.0)	0.0 (0.0)	0.0 (0.0)	0.0 (0.0)	0.0 (0.0)	0.0 (0.0)	trace	3.4 (8.6)	7.5 (19)	21.1 (54)
Average extreme snow depth inches (cm)	2.4 (6.1)	2.6 (6.6)	1.0 (2.5)	0.0 (0.0)	0.0 (0.0)	0.0 (0.0)	0.0 (0.0)	0.0 (0.0)	0.0 (0.0)	0.0 (0.0)	0.7 (1.8)	3.0 (7.6)	4.9 (12)
Average precipitation days (≥ 0.01 in)	9.5	7.4	7.8	6.6	7.4	6.0	2.5	2.3	3.0	7.1	9.2	10.6	79.4
Average snowy days (≥ 0.1 in)	4.9	1.9	0.6	0.0	0.0	0.0	0.0	0.0	0.0	0.0	1.8	6.2	15.4
Source 1: NOAA
Source 2: National Weather Service

== Economy ==
In 2024, WinCo Foods, a regional supermarket chain, began construction of a distribution center and cold storage facility in Ellensburg. It is scheduled to be fully completed in 2031 and encompass 700,000 square feet (65,000 m^{2}).

== Demographics ==
Historical population
Census	Pop.	Note	%±
1870	150		—
1880	150		0.0%
1890	2,768		1,745.3%
1900	1,737		−37.2%
1910	4,209		142.3%
1920	3,967		−5.7%
1930	4,621		16.5%
1940	5,944		28.6%
1950	8,430		41.8%
1960	8,625		2.3%
1970	13,568		57.3%
1980	11,752		−13.4%
1990	12,361		5.2%
2000	15,414		24.7%
2010	18,174		17.9%
2020	18,666		2.7%
2024 (est.)	20,996		12.5%
U.S. Decennial Census; 2020 Census

=== 2020 census ===
As of the 2020 census, there were 18,666 people, 8,110 households, and 3,541 families residing in the city.

The census recorded a median age of 27.3 years; 16.8% of residents were under the age of 18, and 13.4% of residents were 65 years of age or older. For every 100 females there were 98.5 males, and for every 100 females age 18 and over there were 97.9 males age 18 and over.

99.0% of residents lived in urban areas, while 1.0% lived in rural areas.

There were 8,110 households in Ellensburg, of which 21.8% had children under the age of 18 living in them. Of all households, 30.0% were married-couple households, 26.7% were households with a male householder and no spouse or partner present, and 33.8% were households with a female householder and no spouse or partner present. About 37.1% of all households were made up of individuals and 12.0% had someone living alone who was 65 years of age or older.

There were 8,924 housing units, of which 9.1% were vacant. The homeowner vacancy rate was 1.0% and the rental vacancy rate was 8.0%.

Racial composition as of the 2020 census
Race	Number	Percent
White	14,391	77.1%
Black or African American	315	1.7%
American Indian and Alaska Native	313	1.7%
Asian	675	3.6%
Native Hawaiian and Other Pacific Islander	64	0.3%
Some other race	1,133	6.1%
Two or more races	1,775	9.5%
Hispanic or Latino (of any race)	2,498	13.4%

=== 2010 census ===
As of the 2010 census, there were 18,174 people, 7,301 households, and 2,889 families living in the city. The population density was 2,626.3 inhabitants per square mile (1,014.0/km^{2}). There were 7,867 housing units at an average density of 1,136.8 per square mile (438.9/km^{2}). The racial makeup of the city was 85.7% White, 1.5% African American, 1.0% Native American, 3.2% Asian, 0.2% Pacific Islander, 4.6% from other races, and 3.7% from two or more races. Hispanic or Latino of any race were 9.7% of the population.

There were 7,301 households, of which 19.3% had children under the age of 18 living with them, 28.2% were married couples living together, 8.2% had a female householder with no husband present, 3.1% had a male householder with no wife present, and 60.4% were non-families. 35.1% of all households were made up of individuals, and 9.6% had someone living alone who was 65 years of age or older. The average household size was 2.16 and the average family size was 2.86.

The median age in the city was 23.5 years. 14.2% of residents were under the age of 18; 41.2% were between the ages of 18 and 24; 21.8% were from 25 to 44; 13.9% were from 45 to 64; and 8.9% were 65 years of age or older. The gender makeup of the city was 50.1% male and 49.9% female.

=== 2000 census ===
As of the 2000 census, there were 15,414 people, 6,249 households, and 2,649 families living in the city. The population density was 2,338.9 people per square mile (903.1 people/km^{2}). There were 6,732 housing units at an average density of 1,021.5 per square mile (394.4/km^{2}). The racial makeup of the city was 88.07% White, 1.17% Black or African American, 0.95% Native American, 4.09% Asian, 0.16% Pacific Islander, 2.86% from other races, and 2.69% from two or more races. 6.33% of the population were Hispanic or Latino of any race.

There were 6,249 households, of which 20.8% had children under the age of 18 living with them, 31.4% were married couples living together, 8.1% had a female householder with no husband present, and 57.6% were non-families. 35.5% of all households were made up of individuals, and 9.1% had someone living alone who was 65 years of age or older. The average household size was 2.12 and the average family size was 2.84.

In the city, the population was spread out, with 15.8% under the age of 18, 39.3% from 18 to 24, 22.7% from 25 to 44, 12.8% from 45 to 64, and 9.4% who were 65 years of age or older. The median age was 24 years. For every 100 females, there were 95.0 males. For every 100 females age 18 and over, there were 93.1 males.

The median income for a household in the city was $20,034, and the median income for a family was $37,625. Males had a median income of $31,022 versus $22,829 for females. The per capita income for the city was $13,662. About 18.8% of families and 34.3% of the population were below the poverty line, including 29.0% of those under age 18 and 11.2% of those age 65 or over.

== Arts and culture ==
The City of Ellensburg has several local art museums and galleries:

- Kittitas County Historical Museum
- The Goodey Gallery
- Clymer Museum and Gallery
- Gallery One Visual Arts Center
- 420 Loft Art Gallery
- Sarah Spurgeon Gallery, Central Washington University (CWU) Department of Art
- Museum of Culture & Environment, Central Washington University
- Dick and Jane's Spot

== Events ==
- The Ellensburg Farmers Market is held every Saturday from May to October in downtown Ellensburg.
- Ellensburg hosts the annual Winterhop Brewfest in January. Over 21 micro breweries from around the Pacific Northwest serve their product at various venues in the downtown buildings.
- Every June, Ellensburg hosts Dachshunds on Parade. Events include a parade, Dachshund races, pet tricks, and a dog costume contest.
- Ellensburg hosts the annual Jazz in the Valley music festival on the last weekend in July.
- Ellensburg is a stop on the PRCA professional rodeo circuit, occurring each year on Labor Day weekend. The Ellensburg Rodeo has been a town tradition since 1923, and is the largest rodeo in Washington state. The rodeo arena is encompassed by the Kittitas County Fair, also held during Labor Day weekend. The Kittitas County Fair officially began in 1885, and has been held at its current location since 1923.
- Downtown Ellensburg hosts Buskers in the Burg the last Saturday in September. It included street performers (buskers), giant puppet art parade, tasting halls, children's activities, and an outdoor evening concert.

== Government and politics ==
The City of Ellensburg uses the council–manager form of government with a city manager hired by the city council. The seven-member city council is elected at-large and serve four-year terms. The City Council elects a Mayor and Deputy Mayor from the council to serve 2-year terms.

The city lies within the 13th legislative district, which elects one senator and two representatives to serve in the Washington State Legislature. At the congressional level, Ellensburg is within the 8th district, which includes all of Kittitas and Chelan counties, along with the eastern portions of the Seattle metropolitan area.

== Media ==
Kittitas County is served by the Daily Record, a newspaper published in Ellensburg five days a week.

The city maintains its own public library, which opened on January 20, 1910, using funds donated by Andrew Carnegie.

== Education ==
=== Higher education ===
The main campus of Central Washington University in Ellensburg covers over 226 acres (91 ha) and is the only four-year university in the region. It was established in 1891 as the Washington State Normal School, a teachers' college, and later renamed as it expanded to offer bachelor's and master's degrees in various programs. Central Washington had 8,509 total enrolled students in 2024, ranking sixth among post-secondary institutions in Washington state.

=== Public schools ===
Public schools are operated by Ellensburg School District 401. The district includes one high school (Ellensburg High School), one middle school, and four elementary schools.

== Infrastructure ==
=== Transportation ===
Ellensburg lies at the intersection of several major highways that cross Washington state. Interstate 82 connects the city to the Yakima Valley and crosses over the Manastash Ridge. Interstate 90 carries east–west traffic from Seattle to Spokane and crosses the Cascades at Snoqualmie Pass. U.S. Route 97 travels north–south from Yakima to the Wenatchee Valley with onward connections to the British Columbia Interior in the north and Central Oregon to the south.

The city government operates Central Transit, which has five bus routes, paratransit, and on-demand medical transport. The system is fare-free and primarily funded by a sales tax within the designated public transportation benefit area around cities in Kittitas County. Central Transit also partners with HopeSource, a non-profit organization, to operate the Kittitas County Connector, which launched in 2019 and connects Ellensburg to outlying communities in the county. Several intercity bus operators also serve stops in Ellensburg, including FlixBus and the Travel Washington Apple Line. Yakima Transit also provides intercity commuter service from Ellensburg to Yakima that is contracted out to a private company and funded by a state grant.

== Notable people ==
- Byron Beck, American Basketball Association player
- Drew Bledsoe, National Football League player
- John Brotherton, actor
- Daryl Chapin, physicist best known for co-inventing solar cells
- John Clymer, painter and illustrator
- Gary Lee Conner, singer-songwriter, guitarist, co-founder of Screaming Trees band
- Van Conner, singer-songwriter, bassist, co-founder of Screaming Trees band
- Brian Habib, National Football League player
- Brian Haley, actor, comedian
- John Haughm, founder, guitarist, and vocalist of the band Agalloch, and later Pillorian.
- Dave Heaverlo, Major League baseball pitcher
- Stevin John, known as "Blippi", YouTube creator, children's entertainer, and educator
- Jon Kitna, National Football League player
- Mark Lanegan, singer-songwriter, co-founder and lead singer of Screaming Trees band
- Ron Magers, television news anchor
- Michael Mina, American chef and restaurateur
- Mark Pickerel, singer-songwriter acoustic guitar percussionist, co-founder of Screaming Trees band
- Brian Thompson, actor
- David Wilkie, NHLer for the Montreal Canadiens and Tampa Bay Lightning.
- Nick Zentner, a geology professor at Central Washington University, also known for online videos covering the geology of the Northwestern United States.
