= Interstate 82 =

Interstate in Washington and Oregon

Interstate 82
- I-82 highlighted in red

Route information
- Length: 143.58 mi (231.07 km)
- Existed: October 17, 1957–present
- History: Completed in 1988
- Tourist routes: Lewis and Clark Trail
- NHS: Entire route

Major junctions
- West end: I-90 / US 97 in Ellensburg, Washington
- US 12 in Yakima, Washington; SR 24 in Yakima, Washington; US 97 in Union Gap, Washington; I-182 / US 12 near Richland, Washington; US 395 in Kennewick, Washington; US 395 / US 730 in Umatilla, Oregon
- East end: I-84 / US 30 near Hermiston, Oregon

Location
- Country: United States
- States: Washington, Oregon
- Counties: Washington: Kittitas, Yakima, Benton; Oregon: Umatilla

Highway system
- Interstate Highway System; Main; Auxiliary; Suffixed; Business; Future
| ← OR 78 | Oregon | → OR 82 |
| ← SR 41 | Washington | → I-90 |

Interstate 82 (I-82) is an Interstate Highway in the Pacific Northwest region of the United States that travels through parts of Washington and Oregon. It runs 144 miles (232 km) from its northwestern terminus at I-90 in Ellensburg, Washington, to its southeastern terminus at I-84 in Hermiston, Oregon. The highway passes through Yakima and the Tri-Cities, and is also part of the link between Seattle and Salt Lake City, Utah. I-82 travels concurrently with U.S. Route 97 (US 97) between Ellensburg and Union Gap; US 12 from Yakima to the Tri-Cities; and US 395 from Kennewick to Umatilla, Oregon.

I-82 primarily serves the Yakima Valley agricultural region, following the Yakima and Columbia rivers southeastward to the Tri-Cities. The highway enters the valley from the north by crossing the Manastash Ridge, which separates Yakima from the Kittitas Valley. I-82 bypasses the Tri-Cities by traveling southwest around Richland and Kennewick and then turns south to cross the Columbia River on the Umatilla Bridge. Its only auxiliary route, I-182, connects the highway to Richland and Pasco in the Tri-Cities.

The I-82 corridor was originally used by several state and national highways, including the Inland Empire Highway and US 410, which were built in the early 20th century. The federal government created I-82 in late 1957 to serve military facilities in the region, replacing an earlier designation for what is now I-84. The first section of I-82 to be constructed was the easterly bypass of Yakima, which opened in 1963 and was gradually extended north to Ellensburg by 1971. The Yakima Valley section, connecting Union Gap to Prosser, was constructed between 1977 and 1982.

The routing of the highway between Prosser and I-84 was very controversial among Tri-Cities residents, who lobbied for a longer I-82 alignment to serve them. Oregon legislators and highway officials remained opposed to a routing that bypassed Umatilla, leading to several attempts at finding a compromise along the Wallula Gap or in other areas southeast of the Tri-Cities. In 1973, Oregon and Washington adopted a federal compromise to build I-82 through Umatilla and around the outskirts of the Tri-Cities with a spur route (I-182) to serve the area directly. The Tri-Cities section opened in 1986 while in Oregon, the final section of I-82 was completed in 1988. In the early 2000s, Oregon highway officials examined plans to extend I-82 farther south through eastern Oregon and towards California, but they were not considered for further study.

== Route description ==
I-82 travels 143.6 miles (231 km) through a part of the Inland Northwest in a generally northwest–southeast direction along the Yakima and Columbia rivers. The four-lane divided highway forms part of the link between Seattle and the inland West, which includes Boise, Idaho and Salt Lake City, Utah. I-82 is a component of the Interstate Highway System and is also designated as an important national highway under the National Highway System. It is also listed as a Highway of Statewide Significance by the Washington state government. I-82 has one auxiliary route, I-182, a spur route that serves the Tri-Cities region. It also has two child state highways in Washington: State Route 821 (SR 821) that runs from Selah to Ellensburg, and SR 823 that runs from Yakima to Selah.

I-82 is maintained by the Washington State Department of Transportation (WSDOT) and the Oregon Department of Transportation (ODOT) within their respective states. Both agencies conduct annual surveys of traffic on segments of the freeway, the results of which are expressed in terms of annual average daily traffic (AADT), a measure of traffic volume for any average day of the year. The most heavily trafficked and the least trafficked sections of I-82 are located in Washington; the busiest section is in downtown Yakima near SR 24, which carried a daily average of 52,000 vehicles in 2016, and the least-trafficked section is the terminus at I-90 near Ellensburg, which carried 9,100 vehicles. In 2016, ODOT's measurements of average daily traffic ranged from a minimum of 13,700 vehicles at Powerline Road near Hermiston to a maximum of 21,700 vehicles at the Umatilla Bridge.

=== Yakima Valley ===
I-82 begins southeast of Ellensburg, Washington, at a trumpet interchange with I-90, the state's major east–west freeway. I-82 travels southward in a concurrency with US 97, which continues northwest along I-90 around Ellensburg and intersects with SR 821 at Thrall on the southern edge of the Kittitas Valley. The freeway climbs the Manastash Ridge, traveling southeastward around Yakima River Canyon, where SR 821 runs as a meandering scenic byway. Here, I-82 also forms the western edge of the Yakima Firing Range, a military training and exercise facility that stretches across the plateau to the Columbia River Gorge. The freeway reaches its highest point at Vanderbilt Gap, which is 2,672 feet (814 m) above sea level and only 300 feet (91 m) lower than Snoqualmie Pass on I-90. From the gap, the highway crosses into Yakima County and turns southwestward as it begins its descent from the ridge.

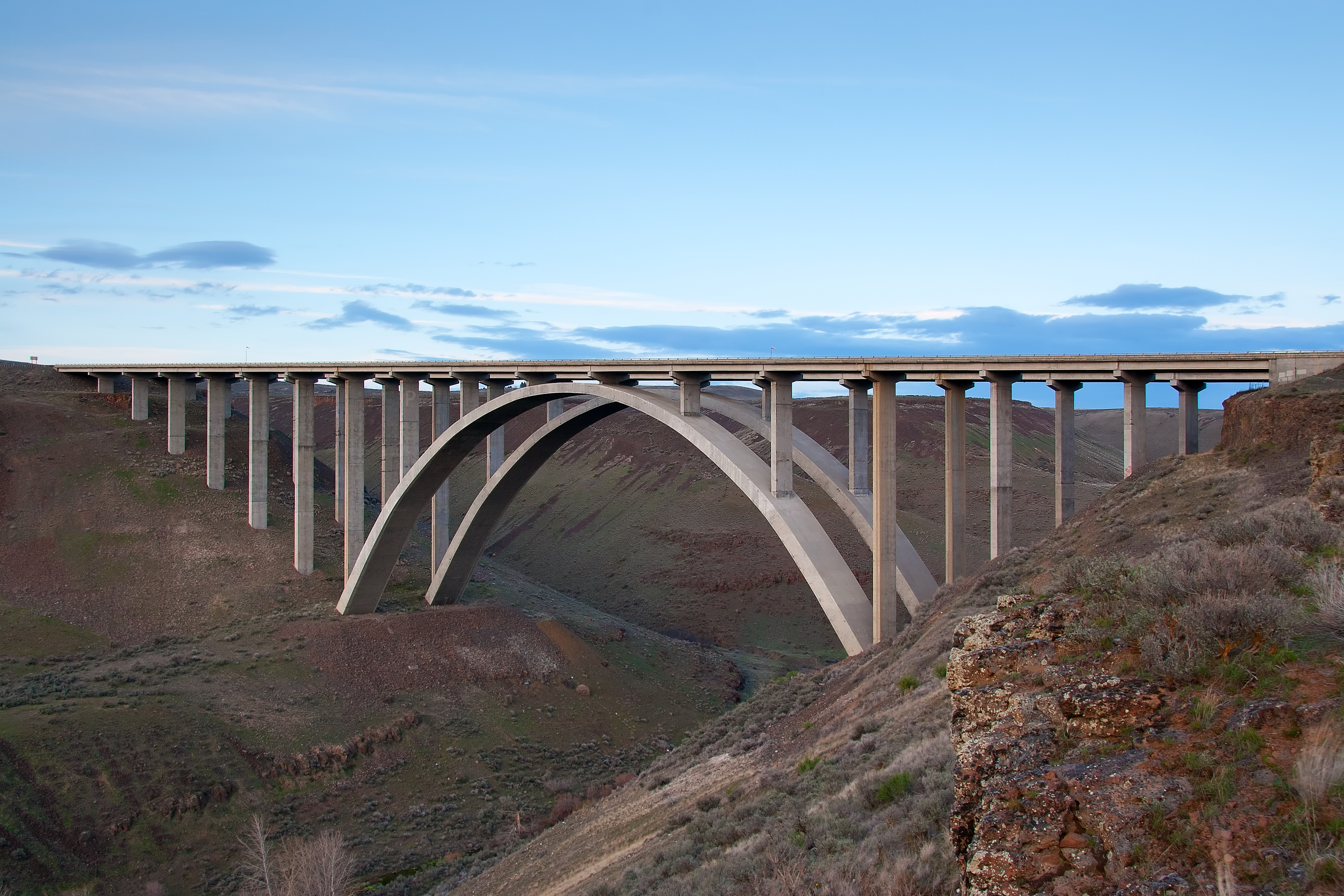
The Fred G. Redmon Bridge carries I-82 over Selah Creek in the Manastash Ridge

Just north of Selah, I-82 crosses the Fred G. Redmon Bridge, a 325-foot-high (99 m), twinned arch bridge that spans Selah Creek. At the time of its opening in 1971, the Redmon Bridge was the longest concrete-arch bridge in North America at 1,337 feet (408 m), losing its record in 1993 to new bridges in St. Paul, Minnesota, and Franklin, Tennessee. Southwest of the bridge, the freeway passes several farms and industrial buildings before reaching an interchange with the southern end of SR 821. I-82 continues on the eastern bank of the Yakima River to the east of Selah and intersects SR 823 in Selah Gap, a narrow canyon between two arms of the Yakima Ridge. The freeway, which runs parallel to a section of SR 823 in its median, crosses the Yakima and Naches rivers at their confluence and enters Yakima.

On the southern side of the confluence, I-82 and US 97 intersect US 12, a major cross-state highway that uses White Pass to travel over the Cascade Mountains, and begins a concurrency with it. The three highways travel southward along the Yakima River, veering east of downtown Yakima and its inner neighborhoods. The freeway passes through several urban interchanges, including the western terminus of SR 24 at Nob Hill Boulevard and a hybrid dogbone–partial cloverleaf interchange at the Valley Mall. I-82 continues southward through Union Gap and splits from US 97 at the eponymous canyon, where it crosses the Yakima River with US 12.

I-82 and US 12 travel southeastward in the shadow of the Rattlesnake Hills and along the north side of the Yakima River, opposite from US 97 and the BNSF Railway's Yakima Valley Subdivision on the Yakama Indian Reservation. The freeway follows the Central Washington Railroad and intersects several roads connecting to cities on the southern side of the river, including Wapato and Toppenish, the latter of which is connected via an interchange with SR 22 near Buena. This section of the highway also passes through the Yakima Valley agricultural region, which includes Rattlesnake Hills AVA and Yakima Valley AVA—major areas for wine and hops production, along with other crops. I-82 travels along the southern edge of Zillah and passes the historic Teapot Dome Service Station, a gas station and piece of political and novelty architecture that became a roadside attraction. Past Zillah, the freeway intersects SR 223 in Granger and SR 241 southeast of Sunnyside, bypassing both towns. I-82 continues southeastward through Grandview and toward Prosser at the edge of the Tri-Cities metropolitan area in Benton County.

=== Tri-Cities and Umatilla ===
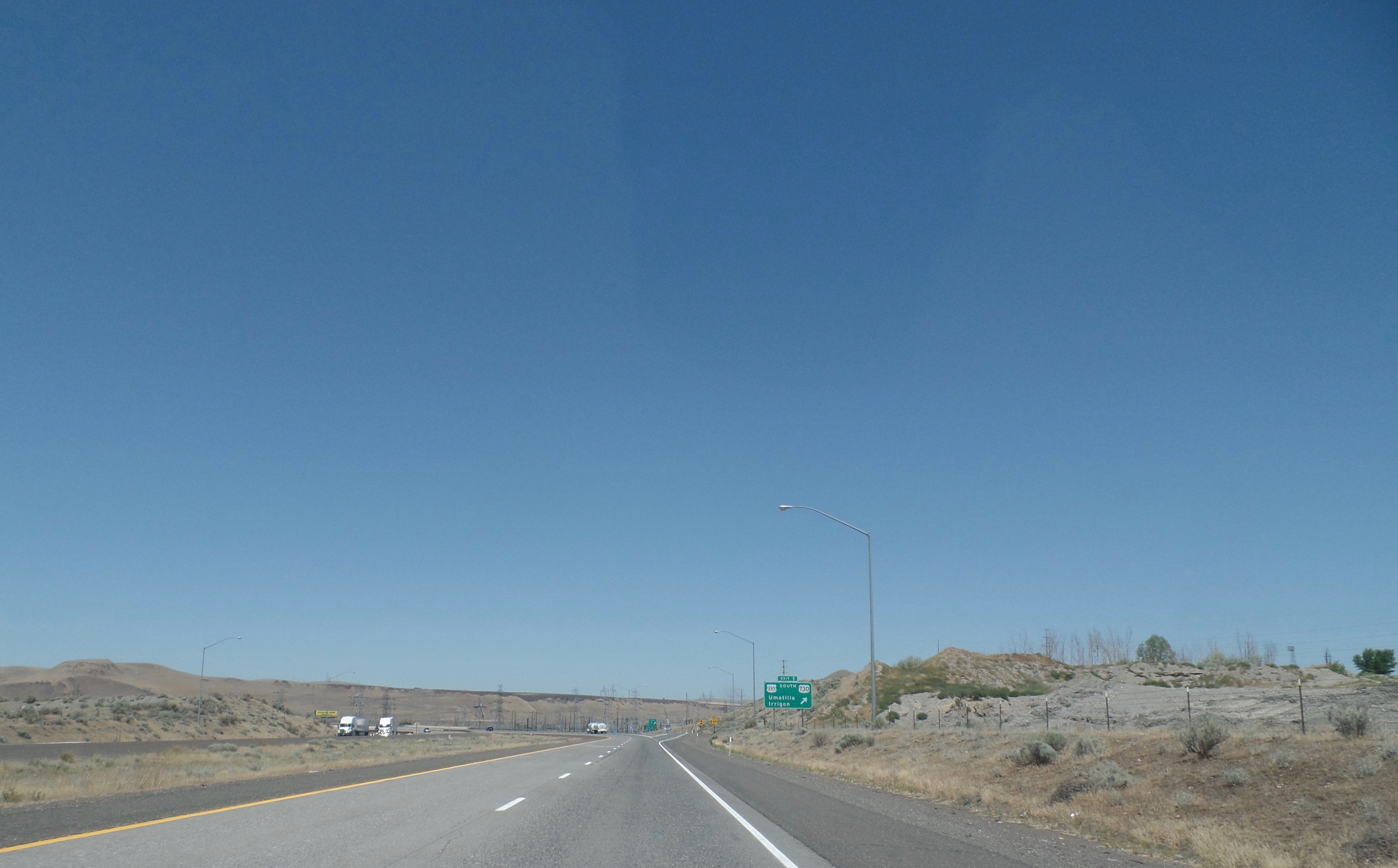
I-82 westbound near Umatilla, approaching a junction with US 395 and US 730

I-82 and US 12 pass several wineries and tasting rooms in northern Prosser before crossing the Yakima River east of the city center. The freeway continues northeastward on the southern side of the Yakima River, running along the bottom of the Horse Heaven Hills. Near Chandler Butte, the highway turns southeastward and intersects SR 224 and SR 225 on the southern side of Benton City. I-82 continues eastward to an interchange with I-182, its sole auxiliary route, at Goose Gap near West Richland; from here, I-182 travels concurrently with US 12 into Richland and Pasco, while I-82 bypasses the Tri-Cities to the southwest, staying south of Badger Mountain. I-82 continues southeastward along the edge of the Horse Heaven Hills to an interchange with US 395 south of Kennewick, where it forms another concurrency. The Kennewick–Plymouth section of the freeway is also signed as part of the Lewis and Clark Trail, a Washington state scenic byway.

I-82 and US 395 travel southward and ascend the Horse Heaven Hills to an intersection with SR 397, a highway that provides an alternate truck route for Kennewick and Finley. The freeway continues southwestward along Bofer and Fourmile canyons, descending from the hills and passing irrigated farmland while approaching the Columbia River. Northeast of Plymouth, it intersects the eastern terminus of SR 14, a cross-state highway that follows the Columbia River westward to Vancouver, and crosses the BNSF Fallbridge Subdivision, which carries Amtrak's Empire Builder passenger trains. I-82 and US 395 cross the Columbia River west of McNary Dam on Umatilla Bridge, which consists of a unique, multiple cantilever, steel truss bridge carrying the eastbound lanes, a newer concrete segmental bridge that carries the westbound lanes, and a multi-use trail for bicyclists and pedestrians.

After crossing into Oregon, the freeway enters Umatilla and intersects US 730, which becomes briefly concurrent with US 395 after it splits from I-82. I-82, designated as the unsigned McNary Highway No. 70 under Oregon's named highway system, continues southwestward across the Umatilla River around central Hermiston. The freeway runs along the edge of the Umatilla Chemical Depot and terminates at an interchange with I-84, which is concurrent with US 30, southwest of Hermiston; I-84 and US 30 continue westward along the Columbia River toward Portland and eastward to Pendleton and Boise, Idaho.

== History ==
=== Predecessor highways ===
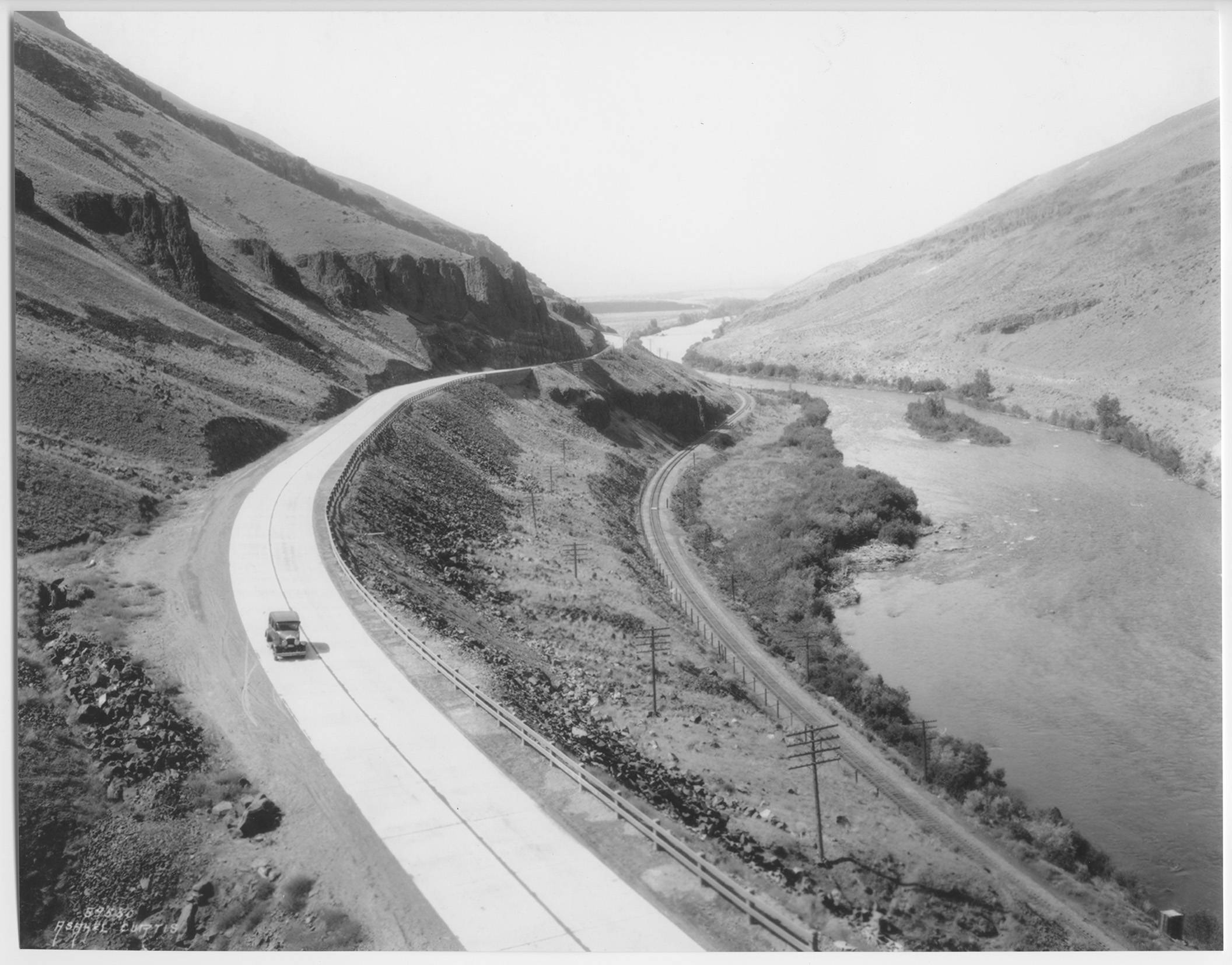
A section of the concrete-paved Yakima River Canyon Highway (now SR 821), seen shortly after opening in 1924

Several sections of I-82 follow railroads and wagon roads that were built in the late 19th century to connect towns in Washington Territory, generally following early Indian trails. In the 1880s, the Northern Pacific Railway constructed a railroad along the Yakima River between Ellensburg and Pasco as part of its transcontinental route to Tacoma via Stampede Pass. The section through Yakima River Canyon between Ellensburg and North Yakima (now Yakima) bypassed an early toll road constructed by settler Jacob Durr that traveled farther west via Wenas Valley and Shushuskin Canyon.

In 1909, the Washington state government appropriated funds to survey routes through the Yakima Valley as part of a potential extension of the state road system. In 1913, at the suggestion of good roads advocates, the Washington State Legislature established the Inland Empire Highway as one of the trunk routes of its state highway system and appropriated $301,000 (equivalent to $7.01 million in 2024 dollars) to construct it to modern standards. The highway incorporated several existing and planned county roads from Ellensburg to Pasco; it then continued eastward to Walla Walla and northward to Spokane and the Canadian border near Kettle Falls. The Durr toll road was bypassed by a new highway through the Yakima River Canyon that opened on September 12, 1924, and was fully paved in 1932.

The Inland Empire Highway was also incorporated into the Yellowstone Trail, a national auto trail, and the federal numbered highway system created in 1926. Under the federal system, the Ellensburg–Yakima section formed part of US 97, a north–south route through central Washington and Oregon, and the Yakima–Walla Walla portion became part of US 410, which connected Aberdeen to Lewiston, Idaho. In 1923, the Washington state government renumbered the Inland Empire Highway as State Road 3, which would carry over as Primary State Highway 3 (PSH 3) in 1937. The federal highway system was expanded in the 1930s with an extension of US 395 along US 730 from the Tri-Cities towards Pendleton, Oregon and continuing southward. A branch highway between PSH 3 and the Columbia River near Plymouth—across from Umatilla, Oregon—was added to the state highway system in 1943 as an extension of PSH 8—the North Bank Highway; it was renumbered to SR 12 in 1964 and later SR 14 in 1967. The Plymouth extension connected to the Umatilla Bridge, a toll bridge that was built downstream from the McNary Dam in 1955. US 410 itself was replaced by a western extension of US 12 that was approved in June 1967.

=== Planning and early disputes ===
The Ellensburg–Pendleton corridor was authorized in 1956 but was not formally added to the Interstate system until October 17, 1957. The 132-mile (212 km) corridor was proposed by the Department of Defense and Washington senator Warren Magnuson in part to connect military facilities in the Puget Sound region to the Hanford Site and the Umatilla Chemical Depot. Its inclusion was initially opposed by Oregon, fearing the loss of truck traffic bound for the Intermountain West through Portland. Under the initial plan approved by the Washington state government in January 1958, the highway would travel through the Yakima Valley and cross the Columbia River at Boardman, Oregon, bypassing the Tri-Cities region entirely. It was numbered "Interstate 82" in 1958, re-using an older designation for what would become Interstate 80N (now I-84). In 1959, the Washington State Highway Commission requested that the interstate would follow US 410 across Naches Pass to Tacoma and Aberdeen, but the proposal was quietly abandoned.

The routing of the freeway's northwestern half was subject to disputes, namely the bypassing of the Yakima River Canyon that was favored by truckers due to its gentler grades. In 1965, state highway commissioners chose the eastern route through the Yakima Firing Center, primarily because of its cost and room to support four lanes. A land transfer for 2,612 acres (1,057 ha) from the U.S. Army was approved by Congress in November 1967 to allow for freeway construction near the firing center. A section of the Yakima River Freeway was also planned to pass through part of the Yakama Indian Reservation but the Yakama Nation refused to allow the condemnation of 10 acres (4.0 ha) belonging to its members and filed suit against the state government in 1969. The U.S. District Court and U.S. 9th Circuit Court of Appeals both ruled in favor of the Yakamas, forcing I-82 to be rerouted across the river on non-reservation land.

I-82's chosen route between Union Gap and Granger would pass through 15 miles (24 km) of the Yakima River's flood plain, attracting criticism from the federal Environmental Protection Agency for its potential effects on the area. The Yakima County government also disliked the routing, arguing that it would destroy hundreds of acres of prime agricultural land. A later attempt by environmentalists to move the freeway farther away from the river, including a potential route along the Rattlesnake Ridge, was rejected by the state shorelines hearings board in 1978 due to its extra distance and potential effects on a rare butterfly bog.

=== Tri-Cities routing dispute ===
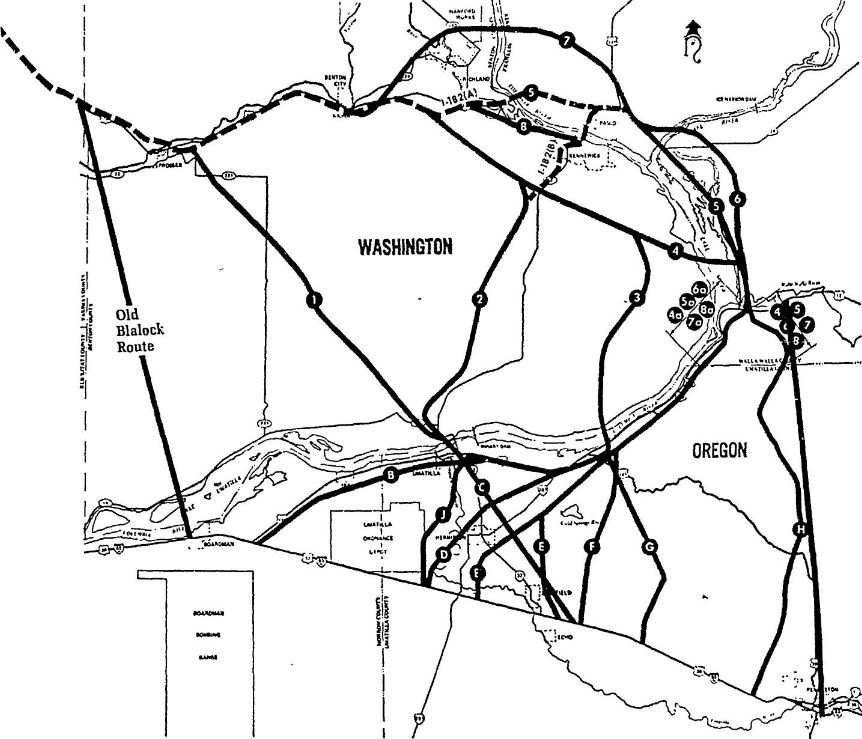
A map produced by the Tri-City Herald in 1974 showing routes considered for I-82 and later I-182

The routing of I-82's southern half was altered several times during the planning process, which lasted until the early 1970s. Due to complications with the construction of a crossing at Blalock Island that was favored by the Port of Morrow, Oregon leaders lobbied for the interstate to cross farther east at the existing Umatilla Bridge. The Prosser–Umatilla route remained the favored alignment for both states in the early part of the process of identifying alternatives, despite growing opposition from business leaders in the Tri-Cities and Walla Walla who sought an interstate connection.

In 1962, the Washington highway commissioner ordered a new routing study for the I-82 corridor after hearing requests from legislators in the Tri-Cities area. The study produced four general corridors, including alternatives that shifted I-82 closer to the Tri-Cities, traversed the area, and continued southeastward along Lake Wallula. The states remained committed to the Umatilla crossing and formally approved the Horse Heaven routing after a two-day public hearing in October 1963. The Tri-Cities and Wallula routes were rejected, in part because of the limited supply of miles allotted by Congress to the Interstate program. Senator Magnuson and Oregon congressman Al Ullman intervened during the federal approval of the routing and called for a re-study. Magnuson later proposed a bill to add 19,000 miles (31,000 km) to the Interstate system, including an allotment for the Tri-Cities, but it failed to advance beyond Congressional committees for several years before quietly excluding I-82. In 1968, the federal government authorized $25 million in funding (equivalent to $172 million in 2024 dollars) for the 28-mile (45 km) addition.

The new study was funded jointly by the two states and contracted to an independent firm that completed it in September 1966. The study recommended that I-82 be routed through Pasco and follow Lake Wallula to a junction with I-80N near Pendleton, fulfilling the general goals of the project despite adding 37 miles (60 km) to the highway and costing another $36 million (equivalent to $265 million in 2024 dollars) to construct. Oregon legislators, particularly those representing the Umatilla area, remained opposed to the routing and accused Washington of trying to "pick-pocket" traffic bound for Oregon. The Washington State Highway Commission gave preliminary approval to the Wallula route in December 1967, with support from the regional director of the Bureau of Public Roads, but their Oregon counterpart remained opposed. Oregon governor Tom McCall met with Senator Magnuson to propose a compromise route that would serve the Tri-Cities and the Port of Umatilla, which would later form the basis of a new study begun in mid-1968.

In May 1969, the Federal Highway Administration (FHWA), the successor to the Bureau of Public Roads, announced a new compromise proposal, routing I-82 through Umatilla and adding a spur route I-182 to serve the Tri-Cities. The Washington State Highway Commission approved the compromise in July 1969, but the Oregon delegation expressed its support of the Wallula routing after it was modified to terminate farther west near Stanfield. The FHWA approved the Wallula alignment in October 1971, but protests from environmentalists over potential harm to local wildlife areas, including the McNary National Wildlife Refuge, forced the plan to be reconsidered in early 1973.

The Oregon commission remained opposed to all options that bypassed the Umatilla Bridge, mirroring public opinion from hearings in Pendleton, while the Washington commission considered a narrowed set of options around Umatilla that were both opposed by the Tri-Cities and Walla Walla. Support for the Wallula routing from the Tri-Cities waned in late 1973, allowing for a revival of the I-182 compromise proposed by the FHWA. The Washington commission approved a compromise route along the Horse Heaven Hills connecting Kennewick to the Umatilla Bridge, along with the I-182 spur to the Tri-Cities, in October 1973 and the Oregon commission approved it that December. The Washington state government also created a new state highway, SR 143, that connected the Umatilla Bridge to Plymouth. The FHWA approved the routing decision but as late as 1978, attempts were made to propose new alignments for the freeway in Oregon.

=== Construction and opening ===
The first section of I-82 to open was the eastern bypass of Yakima, which was planned as an upgrade to PSH 3 in the 1950s and completed in November 1963. The bypass freeway was later extended 2 miles (3.2 km) southward to Union Gap in August 1965 and northward to Selah in August 1967. The 26-mile (42 km) section between Ellensburg and Yakima was funded earlier than scheduled, money being diverted from stalled freeway projects in the Seattle area, and construction began in October 1968. The $35 million freeway project (equivalent to $207 million in 2024 dollars) required the excavation of approximately 20 million cubic yards (15 million m^{3}) of dirt and facilitated the discovery of a new geologic fault that would be monitored for seismic movement. WSDOT contractors built the longest concrete arch spans in North America on the Fred G. Redmon Bridge, which crosses Selah Creek near the city of the same name. The Ellensburg–Yakima freeway was opened on November 12, 1971, and US 97 was transferred to the new highway and the Yakima Canyon route became SR 821, a scenic highway.

Major construction in the Yakima Valley began in 1977 with the building of a $5 million section (equivalent to $18.8 million in 2024 dollars) between Zillah and Granger, and a bypass of Prosser estimated to cost $7.2 million (equivalent to $25 million in 2024 dollars). Freeway construction was accelerated for sections bypassing the worst stretches of US 410, including winding highways or high-traffic roads. The 4-mile (6.4 km) Zillah–Granger freeway opened in January 1979, and the Prosser bypass opened in late August the same year. I-82 was then extended 7 miles (11 km) westward from Prosser to Grandview in January 1981 at a cost of $19 million. A 15-mile (24 km) connection between the existing Yakima Freeway at Union Gap and the Zillah freeway was completed on November 24, 1981, and cost $47 million to construct (equivalent to $124 million in 2024 dollars). The freeway's construction created an embankment between the Yakima River and surrounding areas, which helped to worsen major floods; it also required the digging of several gravel pits nearby, which were later converted into seven trout-stocked ponds that feed a local osprey population. The last section of the Yakima Valley Freeway to be built, running 15 miles (24 km) from Granger to Sunnyside and Grandview, was opened to traffic on October 29, 1982, shortly after a dedication ceremony to commemorate the Yakima Valley project.

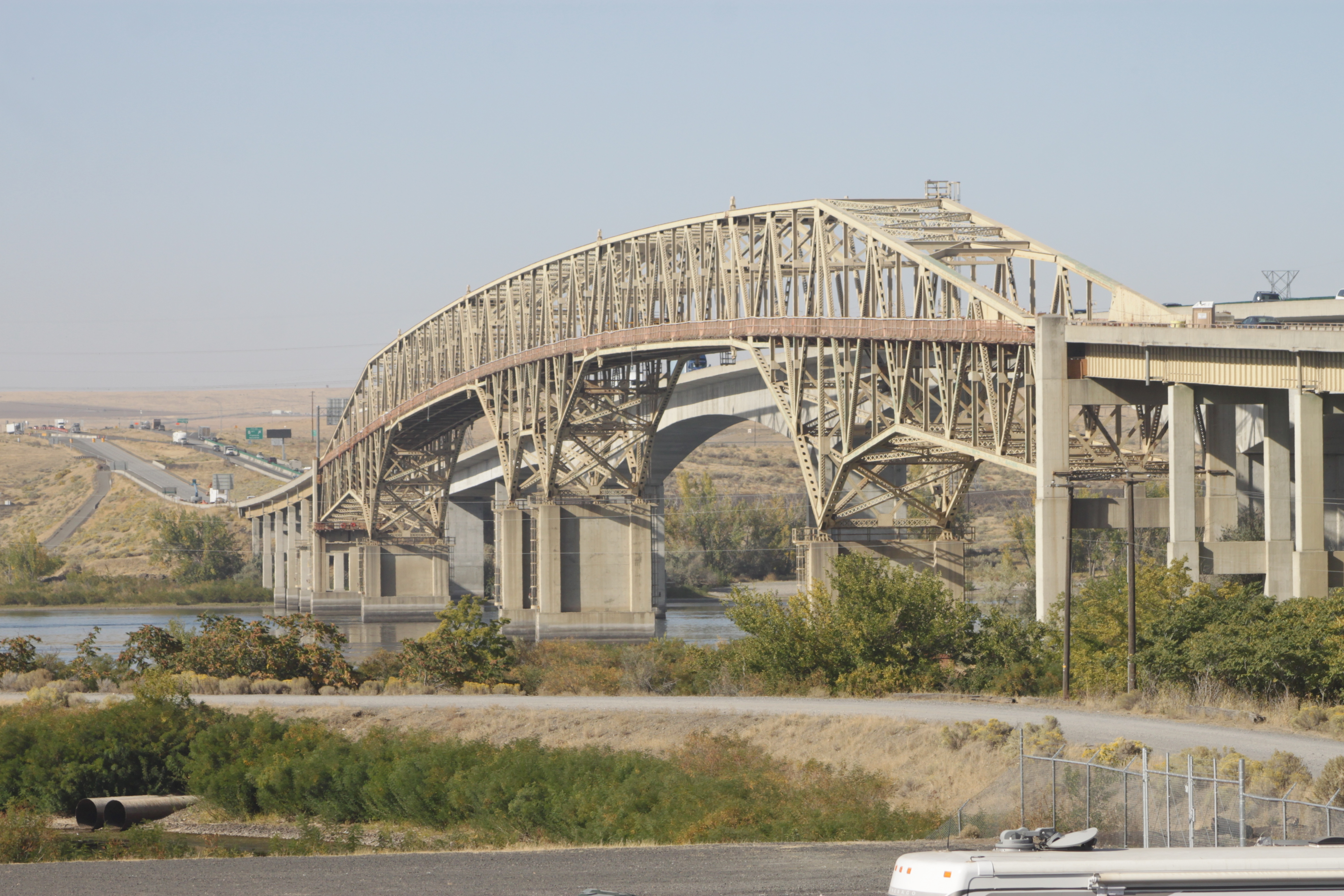
The original Umatilla Bridge, which now carries the eastbound lanes of I-82, seen from the Oregon side

The routing of I-82 around the Tri-Cities and to the Umatilla Bridge was approved by the Benton County government in 1972, generally following SR 14 and bypassing Kennewick to the southwest. Construction on I-82 and I-182 began in 1980, using $340 million (equivalent to $2.95 billion in 2024 dollars) in newly earmarked funds from the U.S. Congress. A short, 2-mile (3.2 km) section bypassing Plymouth and preparing for the new Umatilla Bridge was opened to traffic on August 31, 1981, and cost $5 million to construct (equivalent to $14.6 million in 2024 dollars). The remaining sections on SR 14 between Plymouth and Kennewick were constructed and paved between 1983 and 1985. US 395 was re-aligned onto the new freeway in 1985, replacing an earlier alignment that traveled through Wallula, while SR 14 was truncated to Plymouth and SR 143 was eliminated. The final section of I-82 within Washington state, spanning 17 miles (27 km) from Kiona to an interchange south of Kennewick, was dedicated on February 23, 1986, and opened the following month. During construction of I-82, a pair of fossilized tusks belonging to a mastodon and Columbian mammoth were found by workers near Kiona and Plymouth, respectively, and were excavated by local archaeologists. The existing 12-mile (19 km) divided highway between Prosser and Kiona, built in 1960, was upgraded to Interstate standards in 1987 at a cost of $19.2 million (equivalent to $45.3 million in 2024 dollars).

Construction of the northbound Umatilla Bridge, located 100 feet (30 m) upriver from the original bridge, began in 1985. The new bridge cost $16.5 million (equivalent to $39 million in 2024 dollars) and was completed in October 1987 after two years of construction. The final section of I-82, extending 9.9 miles (15.9 km) between Umatilla and Hermiston, began construction in February 1984 and was dedicated and opened to traffic on September 20, 1988. It was also the final segment of the Interstate Highway system in Oregon, which spanned 731 miles (1,176 km). The southbound Umatilla Bridge underwent a major $5.2 million (equivalent to $11.9 million in 2024 dollars) rehabilitation project and re-opened in July 1990. The total cost to construct I-82 was estimated in 1988 to be $317 million (equivalent to $723 million in 2024 dollars), of which $288 million (equivalent to $657 million in 2024 dollars) was spent in Washington and $29 million (equivalent to $66.2 million in 2024 dollars) was spent in Oregon.

=== Later years ===
I-80N was renumbered to I-84 in 1980 as part of a mandate by American Association of State Highway and Transportation Officials to eliminate suffixed routes and reduce traveler confusion. The designation of I-82 fell outside the standard numbering scheme for Interstates, which uses comparatively higher numbers for the northernmost east–west routes. A 1970s proposal to renumber I-82 to remain in compliance with the numbering scheme was rejected by the Washington State Department of Highways due to the cost of sign replacement and potential for public confusion.

In 1999, the Oregon Legislative Assembly passed a bill directing ODOT to study a proposal for an extension of I-82 to the California or Nevada border. The proposal included the potential use of road tolls to finance the new freeway, but it was later dismissed by ODOT. The I-82 extension study was completed two years later and outlined three general routes that would replace existing north–south highways in eastern Oregon. The westernmost route would follow US 97 from Klamath Falls through Bend and Redmond to Biggs Junction, relying on I-84 to complete its connection with I-82. A variation of the route with a direct connection to I-82 near Hermiston would branch off at Madras and travel northeastward through a mountainous region along Route 218 and Route 207. The easternmost route would follow US 395 between the California border and Pendleton, passing through a less-densely populated region but serving Burns and John Day. The study found that a new freeway would have little effect on economic growth in eastern Oregon and congestion relief in the Willamette Valley, but would provide a suitable alternative route for long-haul travel.

Since the 1990s, the Washington state government has improved or rebuilt several interchanges on I-82, particularly in the Yakima area. In 1998, SR 823 was extended southward from Selah to northern Yakima via a new road in the median of I-82, whose bridges over the Naches and Yakima rivers were also refurbished. The Valley Mall interchange in Union Gap was rebuilt from 2009 to 2011 using a series of roundabouts and a loop ramp to replace the existing freeway ramps. In 2010, two overpasses carrying I-82 were demolished and replaced with new structures that would accommodate a future widening project. A separate proposal in the early 2010s included a third lane for I-82 in northern Yakima, but it was postponed in favor of the building of a new interchange and east–west road at the Cascade Mill development site. A proposal to add climbing lanes for trucks on the steep grades in the Manastash Ridge between Ellensburg and Yakima was made in the 2000s and remains unfunded as of 2017.

I-82's current interchange with SR 224 in Kiona was rebuilt in 2016 and will be supplemented with a new interchange serving the Red Mountain AVA. Construction of the new interchange, which was intended to divert traffic bound for the winery region and new development near West Richland, was proposed by local politicians in the early 2000s but failed to earn funding from the state. The project was postponed in September 2019 after federal officials stated that the traffic volumes would be too low to justify an interchange.

== Exit list ==
| State | County | Location | mi | km | Exit | Destinations | Notes |
|---|---|---|---|---|---|---|---|
| Washington | Kittitas | | 0.00 | 0.00 | — | I-90 / US 97 north – Spokane, Seattle | West end of US 97 overlap; westbound exit and eastbound entrance |
| Washington | Kittitas | | 3.22 | 5.18 | 3 | SR 821 south (Thrall Road) | |
| Washington | Kittitas | | 11.62 | 18.70 | 11 | Military Road – Military Area | |
| Washington | Yakima | | 26.56 | 42.74 | 26 | SR 821 north (Canyon Road) to SR 823 – Selah | |
| Washington | Yakima | | 28.99 | 46.65 | 29 | East Selah Road | |
| Washington | Yakima | | 30.59 | 49.23 | 30 | SR 823 north / Rest Haven Road – Selah | Signed as exits 30A (SR 823) and 30B (Rest Haven Road) westbound |
| Washington | Yakima | Yakima | 31.35 | 50.45 | 31 | US 12 west / North 1st Street – Naches, White Pass | West end of US 12 overlap; signed as exits 31A (US 12) and 31B (1st Street) eastbound |
| Washington | Yakima | Yakima | 33.21 | 53.45 | 33A | Fair Avenue, Lincoln Avenue | Eastbound exit and entrance |
| Washington | Yakima | Yakima | 33.21 | 53.45 | 33B | Yakima Avenue – Terrace Heights | Signed as exit 33 westbound |
| Washington | Yakima | Yakima | 34.74 | 55.91 | 34 | SR 24 east / Nob Hill Boulevard – Moxee | |
| Washington | Yakima | Union Gap | 36.26 | 58.35 | 36 | Valley Mall Boulevard – Union Gap | |
| Washington | Yakima | | 37.81 | 60.85 | 37 | US 97 south – Goldendale, Bend | East end of US 97 overlap; eastbound exit and westbound entrance |
| Washington | Yakima | | 38.07 | 61.27 | 38 | Union Gap | Westbound exit and eastbound entrance |
| Washington | Yakima | | 40.31 | 64.87 | 40 | Thorp Road, Parker Road | |
| Washington | Yakima | | 44.29 | 71.28 | 44 | Wapato | |
| Washington | Yakima | | 50.08 | 80.60 | 50 | SR 22 east – Toppenish, Buena | |
| Washington | Yakima | Zillah | 52.05 | 83.77 | 52 | Zillah, Toppenish | |
| Washington | Yakima | Zillah | 54.05 | 86.99 | 54 | Division Road – Zillah | |
| Washington | Yakima | Granger | 58.47 | 94.10 | 58 | SR 223 south – Granger | |
| Washington | Yakima | Sunnyside | 63.61 | 102.37 | 63 | Sunnyside, Outlook | |
| Washington | Yakima | Sunnyside | 66.90 | 107.67 | 67 | Sunnyside, Mabton | |
| Washington | Yakima | Sunnyside | 68.91 | 110.90 | 69 | SR 241 (Waneta Road) – Vernita Bridge, Mabton | |
| Washington | Yakima | Grandview | 72.58 | 116.81 | 73 | Stover Road – Grandview | |
| Washington | Yakima | Grandview | 75.02 | 120.73 | 75 | County Line Road – Grandview | |
| Washington | Benton | Prosser | 79.90 | 128.59 | 80 | CR 12 (Wine Country Road) / Gap Road – Prosser | |
| Washington | Benton | Prosser | 82.31 | 132.47 | 82 | SR 22 to SR 221 – Mabton, Paterson | |
| Washington | Benton | | 88.52 | 142.46 | 88 | Gibbon Road | |
| Washington | Benton | | 93.58 | 150.60 | 93 | Yakitat Road | |
| Washington | Benton | Benton City | 96.55 | 155.38 | 96 | SR 224 east / SR 225 north – West Richland, Benton City | |
| Washington | Benton | | 102.48 | 164.93 | 102 | I-182 east / US 12 east – Richland, Pasco | East end of US 12 overlap |
| Washington | Benton | | 104.49 | 168.16 | 104 | Dallas Road – West Richland | |
| Washington | Benton | | 108.91 | 175.27 | 109 | Badger Road | |
| Washington | Benton | Kennewick | 112.76 | 181.47 | 113 | US 395 north to I-182 – Kennewick, Pasco, Spokane | West end of US 395 overlap |
| Washington | Benton | | 114.36 | 184.04 | 114 | SR 397 north – Finley | |
| Washington | Benton | | 122.70 | 197.47 | 122 | Coffin Road | |
| Washington | Benton | | 131.55 | 211.71 | 131 | SR 14 west – Plymouth, Vancouver | |
| Columbia River | | | 132.57 0.00 | 213.35 0.00 | Umatilla Bridge; Washington–Oregon state line | | |
| Oregon | Umatilla | Umatilla | 1.00 | 1.61 | 1 | US 395 south / US 730 – Umatilla, Hermiston, Irrigon | East end of US 395 overlap |
| Oregon | Umatilla | | 4.83 | 7.77 | 5 | Power Line Road | |
| Oregon | Umatilla | | 9.79 | 15.76 | 10 | Westland Road | |
| Oregon | Umatilla | | 11.01 | 17.72 | — | I-84 / US 30 – Portland, Pendleton | Eastbound exit and westbound entrance |
1.000 mi = 1.609 km; 1.000 km = 0.621 mi: Concurrency terminus; Incomplete access
