= Rattlesnake Hills AVA =

Viticultural area in Washington State, US

Coordinates: 46°25′34″N 120°17′38″W

Rattlesnake Hills
- Wine region
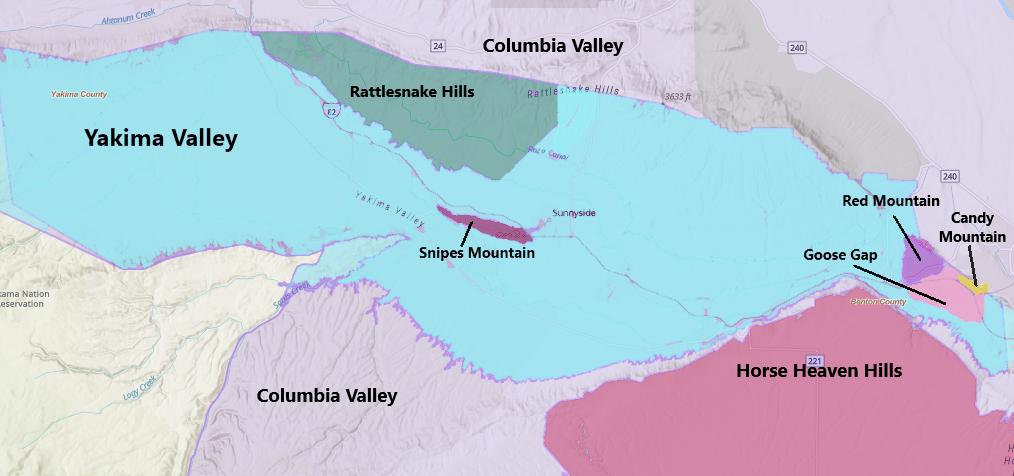
- Type: American Viticultural Area
- Year established: 2006
- Years of wine industry: 58
- Country: United States
- Part of: Washington, Columbia Valley AVA, Yakima County, Yakima Valley AVA
- Other regions in Washington, Columbia Valley AVA, Yakima County, Yakima Valley AVA: Snipes Mountain AVA
- Growing season: 150 days
- Climate region: Region III
- Heat units: 2,869.89 GDD units
- Precipitation (annual average): 6–12 inches (152–305 mm)
- Soil conditions: Predominantly silt-loam or loam
- Total area: 68,500 acres (107 sq mi)
- Size of planted vineyards: 1,500 acres (607 ha)
- No. of vineyards: 29
- Grapes produced: Cabernet Franc, Cabernet Sauvignon, Chardonnay, Chenin blanc, Gewurztraminer, Grenache, Malbec, Merlot, Mourvèdre, Muscat Canelli, Petite Sirah, Riesling, Semillon, Viognier
- No. of wineries: 18
- Wine produced: Varietal, Dessert wine, Meritage

Rattlesnake Hills is an American Viticultural Area (AVA) located in Yakima County in south-central Washington between the towns of Yakima and Kennewick lying on a portion of the Rattlesnake Hills landform. It was established as the nation's 172^{nd} and the state's ninth appellation on February 16, 2006 by the Alcohol and Tobacco Tax and Trade Bureau (TTB), Treasury after reviewing the petition submitted by Mr. Gail Puryear, owner of Bonair Winery, Inc. & Chateau Puryear Vineyards, on behalf of himself and ten local vineyard and winery owners proposing the viticultural area named "Rattlesnake Hills."

The 68,500-acre (107 sq mi) wine region became the second sub-appellation within the Yakima Valley and the sixth within the vast Columbia Valley AVAs. Rattlesnake Hills borders the northern boundary of Yakima Valley including land between the north bank of the Sunnyside Canal and its entire southern boundary slopes are between Outlook and the Wapato Dam. The western boundary meanders on an east–west chain of hills north of Interstate 82 passing through the cities of Parker, Donald, Buena and Zillah while just east of the Yakima River. Rattlesnake Hills rises to the highest point in the Yakima Valley with elevations ranging from 850 to 3,085 feet (259–940 m).

== Opposing Comments ==
Several vineyard and winery owners with up to 28 years of viticulture experience in the region opposed the proposed Rattlesnake Hills viticultural area boundaries as arbitrary arguing the region's climate and soil were no different than other areas inside the Yakima Valley appellation. They also argued that a different name, if any, should be used to define the area, because the actual Rattlesnake Hills extend farther east than the proposed boundary of the appellation. These commenters state that because the Rattlesnake Hills range stretches beyond the proposed viticultural area boundary, the boundary lines should be extended to include more of the range.
One of its most notable opponents was grower Dick Boushey of Boushey Vineyards which resides outside of the AVA boundaries. Boushey argued that the area did not have distinctive "terroir" that would merit an AVA stating ""I know of no regional style, specific variety or type of wine that is unique to this proposed area. The granting of this proposal would confuse consumers and undermine the existing Yakima Valley Appellation."" In response, the petitioner explained that the proposed boundary lines were developed by studying the viticultural feasibility of the Rattlesnake Hills region, including its topography, climate, and soils. The petitioner illustrated that the entire Rattlesnake Hills landform would make a poor viticultural area, with three-fourths of its geographical area unsuitable for viticulture. Ultimately, the TTB ruled the opposition lacked evidence supporting their argument and found the data submitted by the petitioner sufficient to establish the Rattlesnake Hills viticultural area.

== Terroir ==
=== Topography ===
Rattlesnake Hills rises to 3,000 feet (914 m) in elevation, placing the hills' ridgeline up to 2,000 feet (610 m) above the north flank of the Yakima River Valley. Running east to west, the Hills' ridgeline creates north-and south-facing slopes. While the northern slope falls steeply away from the ridgeline, the more gently sloping south side of the Rattlesnake Hills has dissected canyons, ridges, and terraces running south to the Yakima River. The Rattlesnake Hills viticultural area, with elevations between 850 and 3,085 feet (259 and 940 m), lies on the south slope of the Rattlesnake Hills in Yakima County, and includes a multitude of landscapes with differing aspects and hill slope positions. Low glacial terraces comprise the balance of the terrain found within the viticultural area. Vineyards are usually located on the southern ridges and terraces in areas with good air drainage, which lessens the potential for frost damage and winterkill conditions. As compared to the Rattlesnake Hills viticultural area, the rest of the established Yakima Valley viticultural area is lower in elevation, with a flatter, more open and consistent landscape.

=== Climate ===
The Rattlesnake Hills viticultural area has a more temperate climate than surrounding regions and is more protected by its topography from damaging winter weather. The petition includes data collected from 11 weather stations in south-central Washington State, operated by Washington State University (WSU) as part of the Public Agricultural Weather System (PAWS). The Buena station at 900 feet (274 m) in elevation and the Outlook station at 1,300 feet (396 m) in elevation are both within the viticultural area boundary. While still in south-central Washington State, the other nine stations are beyond the area's boundary. The PAWS weather data provides an annual total and a 10-year average of the heat accumulation, as measured in degree days, for each station. (Each degree that a day's mean temperature is above 50 degrees Fahrenheit, which is the minimum temperature required for grapevine growth, is counted as one degree day. See "General Viticulture," by Albert J. Winkler, University of California Press, 1974.) The petition charts shows the 10-year average for the annual growing degree day total for each of the PAWS stations. The degree day temperatures within the Rattlesnake Hills viticultural area vary significantly from the surrounding regions, according to PAWS data. Growing season temperatures are especially warmer in the Red Mountain AVA to the east of the viticultural area around Badger Canyon and Benton City. Also, the portion of the Yakima River Valley located between the Rattlesnake Hills region and Red Mountain generally has a cooler growing season, as documented by the Port of Sunnyside and WSU Roza weather stations.
Topography also affects the area's climate. To the west, the high altitude Cascade Range shields eastern Washington, including the Rattlesnake Hills region, from much of the Pacific Ocean's climatic influence and rainfall. In addition, while polar air from Canada, funneled by strong winds into eastern Washington, can damage or kill grape vines, the Rattlesnake Hills viticultural area is protected from these freezing winds by the Umtanum and Yakima Ridges, which lie to the northeast, and by the main ridgeline of the Hills themselves. These ridges and hills divert the damaging winds eastward toward the Red Mountain and Walla Walla Valley viticultural areas. The USDA plant hardiness zones are 7a and 7b.

=== Soil ===
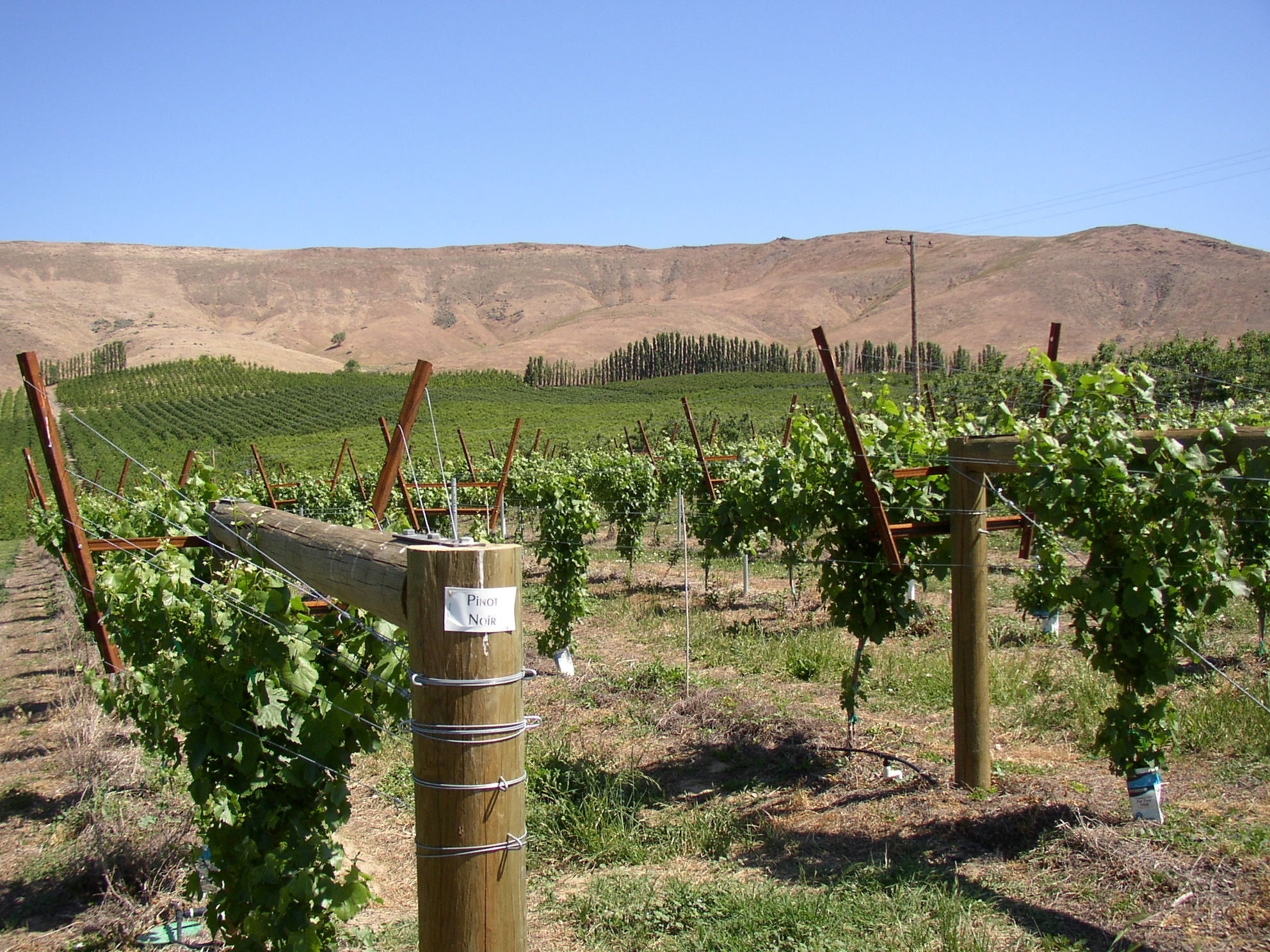
Springtime Pinot Noir grapevines stretch below the Rattlesnake Hills

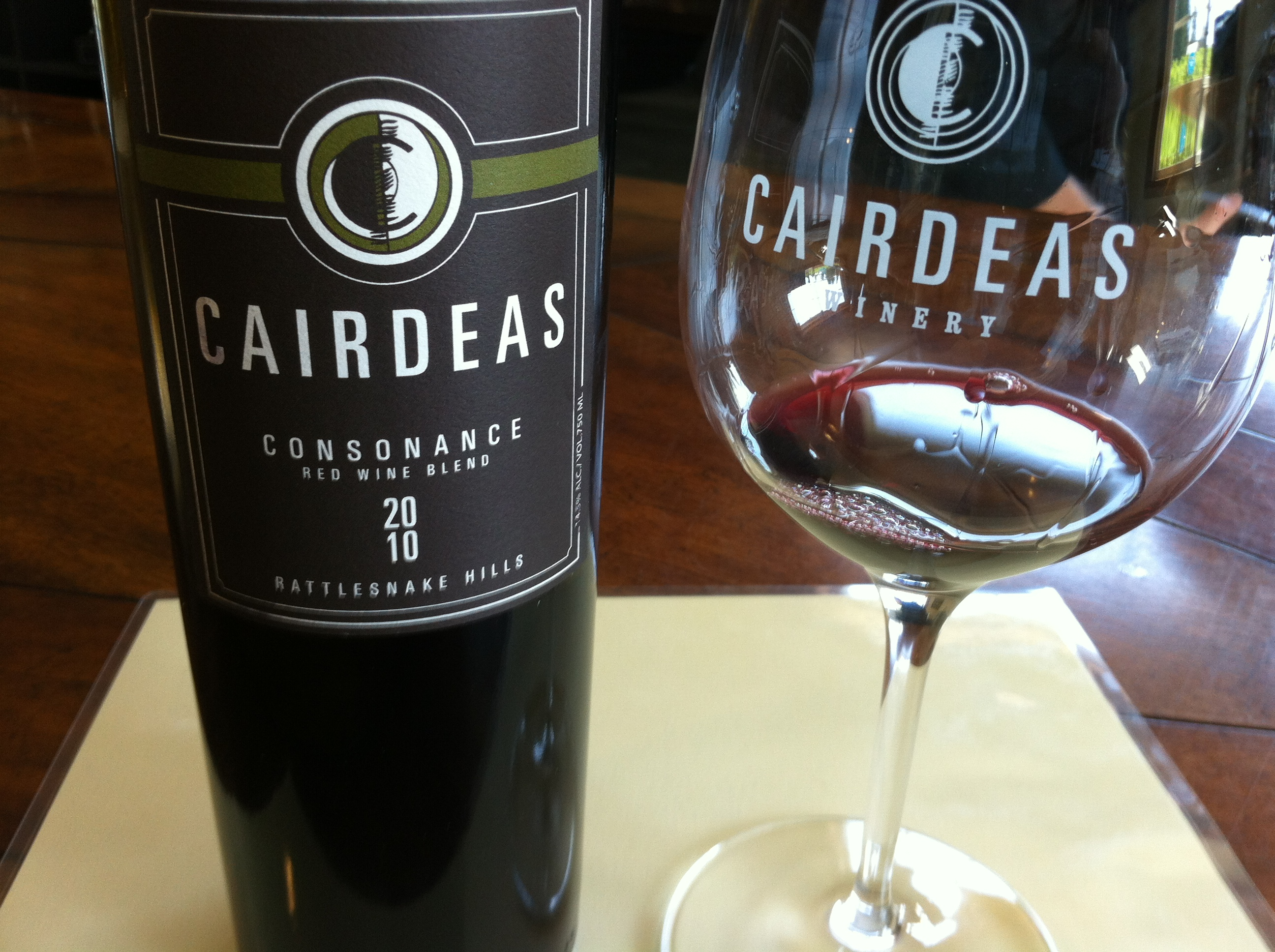
Rattlesnake Hills Red Wine Blend

The soils of the Rattlesnake Hills viticultural area differ from soils in other Washington State viticultural areas and regions. In the rooting zone, or the depth of soil penetrated by plant roots, silt-loam or loam is the predominant soil type found within the Rattlesnake Hills viticultural area. These finer soils textures contrast to the sandy soils of the nearby Prosser Flats, Red Mountain, and Horse Heaven Hills regions, as well as with the silty soils found in the surrounding Yakima Valley region.
The formation of the soils in the Rattlesnake Hills area was influenced by glacial fluvial (water transported) and eolian (wind transported) soils. The topsoil layer is generally formed by loess and lesser amounts of volcanic ash. When Mount St. Helens erupted in 1980, the Rattlesnake Hills region received between one-half and one inch (13 and 25 mm) of volcanic ash. Formation influences on deeper soil layers include volcanic cobbles and tuffaceous sands from the Ellensburg Formation. The Rattlesnake Hills, at or above 1,100 feet (335 m) in elevation, perch beyond the influence of the Missoula Floods. Soils above the flood line developed on older volcanic sediments of the Ellensburg Formation. These soil parent materials weathered in a climate with dry summers and 6 to 12 inches (152 to 305 mm) of annual rainfall. Common soil characteristics within the Rattlesnake Hills viticultural area include a mesic soil regime. The annual soil temperature is between 8 and 15 °C (46 and 59 °F). Mean summer soil temperatures vary between 15 and 22 °C (59 and 72 °F). Also, the soil pH is consistent, ranging from neutral at pH 6.6 to mildly alkaline at pH 8.4.
The primary soils suitable for viticulture within the Rattlesnake Hills viticultural area include the Warden Series silt loams and a composite of Harwood-Burke-Wiehl series silt loams. The Warden Series soils, which are very deep and well drained, occupy terraces underlain by glacial fluvial sediments. The Harwood-Burke-Wiehl series, a complex composition of three distinctively different soils, covers the ridge tops and side slopes of the range's steep hills. This three-soil composition forms from loess (wind-blown, silt-sized material) that overlies remnants of the Ellensburg Formation. The composition is common within the Rattlesnake Hills viticultural area but is seldom found elsewhere in the Yakima Valley viticultural area. Also, the soil is shallow, which is in contrast to the uniformly deep, silt-loamy and sandy soils found in the balance of the Yakima Valley viticultural area. Other soils in the Rattlesnake Hills viticultural area include the Kiona silt loam series in the northwest corner. Also, along the top of the Rattlesnake Ridge, the Lickskillet series of stony silt loam and the Starbuck series provide a suitable viticultural environment when irrigation is available. The steeper north-facing slopes of the Rattlesnake Hills, immediately beyond the viticultural area's northern boundary line, are covered with Lickskillet, a very stony silt loam. The very stony soils, steep slopes, and lack of irrigation make this terrain unsuitable for viticulture. The topography east of the boundary line is a large basin with Warden Series silt loams and some Esquatzel silty loam on two to five percent slopes. Along the southern boundary line of the Rattlesnake Hills viticultural area, and south beyond Sunnyside Canal, is the Yakima River Valley. The Esquatzel Series of silt loams dominate this large, flat-bottomed valley, according to the Soil Survey of Yakima County Area, Washington. The valley also has Warden Series soils that are more geologically eroded and at a lower elevation than the Warden Series of the Rattlesnake Hills region to the north. Past the western border of the Rattlesnake Hills viticultural area the hills drop down to the Yakima River. Immediately west of the river, and beyond the boundaries, lies a valley floor with Weirman Association soils. Continuing westward from the boundary line, the Ashue- Naches Association occupies the bottomland of an older Yakima River floodplain. Also, as the Yakima River Valley rises westward to Ahtanum Ridge, the prevalent Warden Series soil creates a common link to the Rattlesnake Hills area. However, the Warden Series soil in the Rattlesnake Hills terrain includes the exposure of the Ellensburg Formation, unlike the Ahtanum Ridge soil.

== Vineyards ==
Vineyards in Rattlesnake Hills AVA include the Morrison Vineyard, planted in 1968 to Riesling and Cabernet Sauvignon for Chateau Ste. Michelle. It is the oldest vineyard in the wine region. In the late 1970s and early 1980s, the Hyatt Vineyard, Whisky Canyon, Outlook and the Portteus Vineyard were established in Rattlesnake Hills.

== See also ==
- Washington wine
