= Wapato =

Wapato can mean:

- Any of various plants in the genus Sagittaria
- Wapato, Washington, a town named after the plant in the State of Washington in the United States
- Wapato (YTB-788), a United States Navy tug in service from 1966 to 1996
- Sauvie Island, which was originally called Wapato Island
- Wapato Lake, a restored lake in what's now Washington and Yamhill counties
- Wapato Corrections Facility, a built but never opened jail in Multnomah County.
