= Umatilla Bridge =

Bridge between Washington and Oregon, U.S.

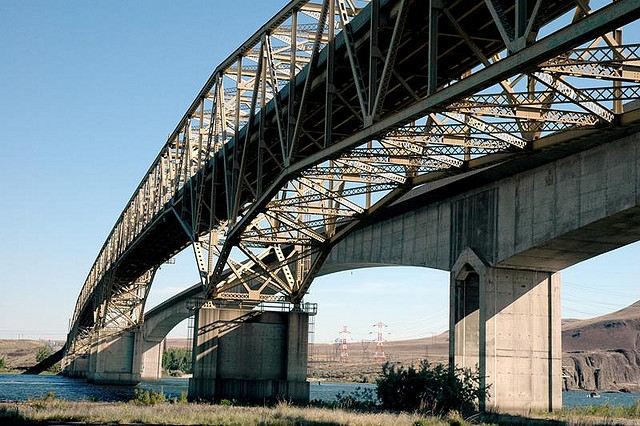
- Looking north from Oregon; older bridge in the foreground
- Coordinates: 45.931°N 119.328°W
- Carries: I-82 / US 395
- Crosses: Columbia River
- Locale: Benton County, Washington – Umatilla County, Oregon
- Official name: Interstate 82 Columbia River Bridge
- Maintained by: Washington State Department of Transportation

Characteristics
- Design: Through truss cantilever bridge (southbound); Arch bridge (northbound)
- Material: Steel (southbound); Concrete (northbound)
- Total length: 3,308 ft (1,008.3 m) (southbound); 3,433 ft (1,046.4 m) (northbound)
- Width: 27.58 ft (8.4 m) (southbound)
- Longest span: 600 ft (182.9 m) (southbound)
- No. of spans: 5 (southbound); 2 (northbound)
- Clearance above: 16 ft (4.9 m) (southbound)
- Clearance below: 85 ft (25.9 m) (southbound); 80 ft (24.4 m) (northbound)

History
- Opened: July 15, 1955 (southbound); 1988 (northbound)

Statistics
- Daily traffic: 10,800 (2017)

Location
- Interactive map of Umatilla Bridge

The Umatilla Bridge is the collective name for a pair of bridges in the northwest United States, carrying Interstate 82/U.S. Route 395 (I-82/US 395) across the Columbia River at the Washington–Oregon border. The older bridge opened in July 1955 and is a steel through truss cantilever bridge and carries southbound (east on I-82) traffic. Northbound traffic (west on I-82) and pedestrians travel on the newer concrete arch bridge, opened in 1988.

== History ==
=== Construction ===
The old bridge was proposed by Umatilla County judge James H. Sturgis and known as "Sturgis' folly" initially. The construction upstream of McNary Dam would create Lake Wallula and submerge the old Wallula Highway. In the interim, traffic was carried across the newly formed lake via ferry service, with 178,576 vehicles transported in 1951. The bridge was dedicated on July 15, 1955, by the governors of Oregon and Washington. The bridge was financed by $10 million worth of bonds and operated as a toll bridge while under county ownership. The tolls were removed on August 30, 1974, and ownership of the bridge was transferred to the states of Oregon and Washington on November 1 of that year following the repayment of bonds. The Washington State Department of Transportation became the lead agency responsible for maintenance and operating the structure.

The original span was considered for inclusion on the National Register of Historic Places in the early 2000s.

=== Rehabilitation ===
In June 2017, work began on the rehabilitation of the older steel truss bridge. The bridge had been found to be structurally deficient by the Washington State Department of Transportation and required a two-stage project, beginning with the replacement of the bridge deck at a cost of $11 million. The eastbound bridge was closed and all traffic was moved to the newer westbound bridge, which was reduced to one lane per direction, until work was completed two years later. During the closure, a traffic jam from the August 21, 2017, solar eclipse caused mile-long backups approaching the Columbia River. The second project to repaint the steel truss structure is estimated to cost $40 million and is expected to be funded at a later date.

== Description ==
The original bridge is a five-span continuous Warren through truss design. The configuration of the span is unusual in the fact that it takes advantage of a submerged island near the middle of the Columbia River. With its two 600-foot (180 m) spans, each constructed using the cantilever method, this is the only bridge in Oregon having two spans constructed using that method.
