= Wapato School District =

Public school district in Washington, US

Wapato School District 207 is a public school district based in Wapato, Yakima County, Washington, United States. In the 2010-2011 school year the district had an enrollment of approximately 3,300 students. The student body is culturally diverse: 71.9% of the students are Hispanic and 19.7% are American Indian. 29% of the students are identified as migrant and 100% of the students qualified for free or reduced meals. Nearly one in five students are from the Yakama Nation, which is centered in nearby Toppenish.

In February 2011 67% of voters approved a $20 million bond to renovate and expand Wapato High School. The state agreed to provide an additional $23 million. The project will renovate or largely replace the existing high school, first constructed in the late 1950s.

== Schools ==
The district operates Seven schools:

- Adams Elementary School
- Camas Elementary School
- Satus Elementary School
- Wapato Middle School
- Wapato High School
- Pace Alternative High School
- Simcoe Elementary
