= Manastash Ridge =

Coordinates: 46°51′28″N 120°20′52″W

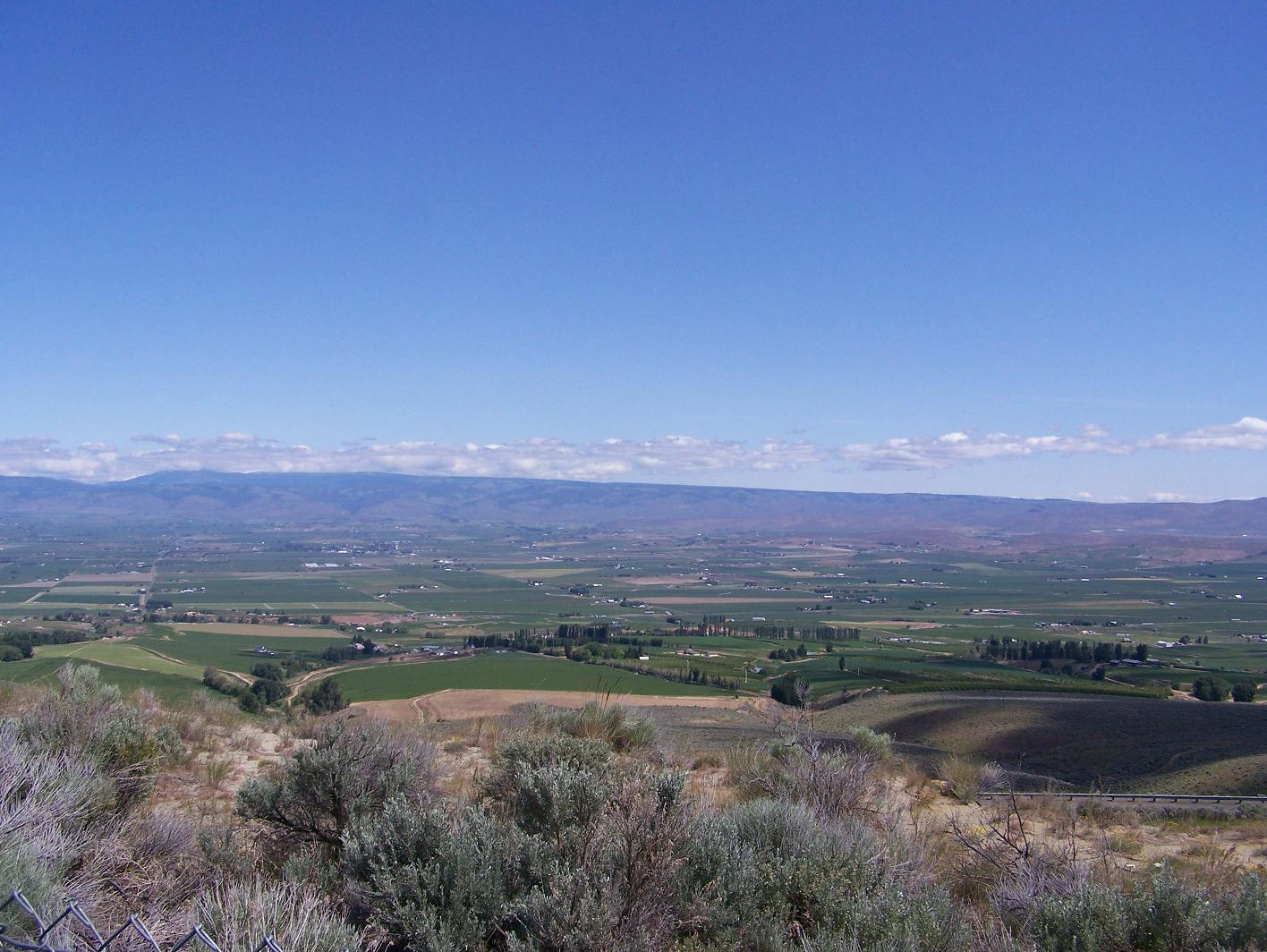
View from Manastash Ridge facing towards Ellensburg, Washington with Cascade Range in the background.

Manastash Ridge is a long anticline mountain ridge located in central Washington state in the United States. Manastash Ridge runs mostly west-to-east in Kittitas and Yakima counties, for approximately 50 miles. The ridge is part of the Yakima Fold Belt of east-tending long ridges formed by the folding of Miocene Columbia River basalt flows.

The name Manastash comes from the Sahaptin word /máːmaštaš/, possibly meaning "we are going root digging".

The highest point in Manastash Ridge is Manastash Peak at 6,335 feet (1,931 m), located 22.4 miles (36.0 km) west of Ellensburg, Washington. Interstate 82 crosses through the eastern portion of the ridge; the Manastash Ridge Summit is located at milepost 7 of the interstate (south of Ellensburg) or about 24 miles (39 km) north of Yakima, Washington at an elevation of 2,672 feet (814 m).

In addition to Manastash Peak, Manastash Ridge includes the peaks of Quartz Mountain (6,289 feet (1,917 m)), Mount Clifty (6,243 feet (1,903 m)), and Lookout Mountain (6,188 feet (1,886 m)). The astronomy department of the University of Washington maintains the Manastash Ridge Observatory, located about 9 miles (14 km) west-southwest of Ellensburg.

The northernmost edge of Manastash Ridge has a network of 14 official trails that span 20 miles (32 km) and are based on a larger system that were developed in the 1960s by Ellensburg-based alpinists. The Manastash Ridge Trails Coalition was formed in 2016 to promote conservation of land on the ridge and improvement of trails, which saw increasing use as Ellensburg's population grew. The lands are owned by the Washington Department of Fish and Wildlife, which took over maintenance of the trails in the 2020s.
