= Plymouth, Washington =

Unincorporated community in Washington, United States

- Unincorporated community
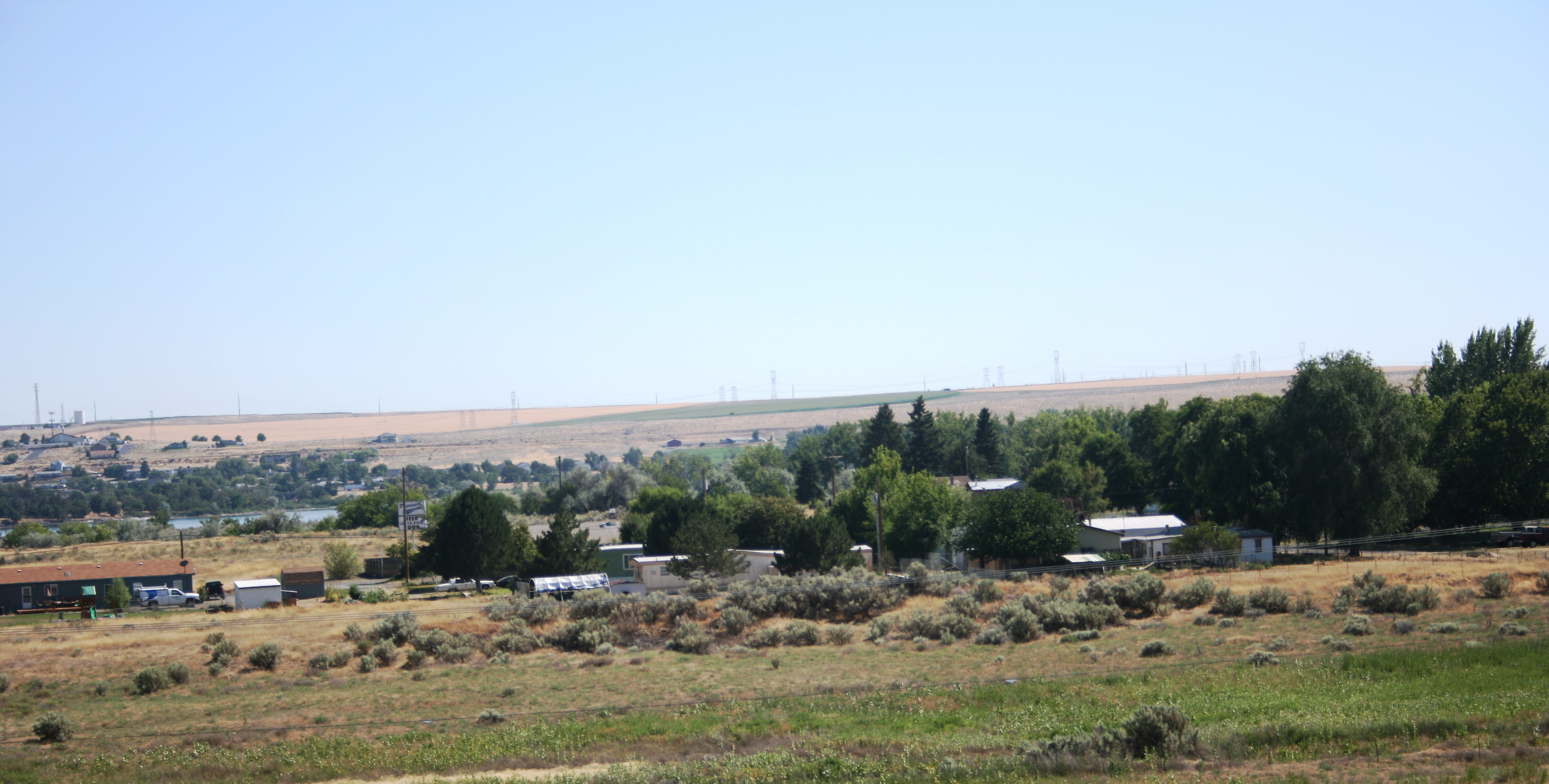
- Plymouth, Washington with Columbia River in background.

- Location within Benton County, Washington
- Coordinates: 45°56′04″N 119°21′01″W
- Country: United States
- State: Washington
- County: Benton
- Elevation: 292 ft (89 m)
- Time zone: UTC-8 (Pacific (PST))
  - Summer (DST): UTC-7 (PDT)
- ZIP code: 99346
- Area code: 509
- GNIS feature ID: 1507501

Plymouth is an unincorporated community in Benton County, Washington, United States. Plymouth is located on the Columbia River across from Umatilla, Oregon. It is south of the Tri-Cities and is served by Interstate 82. It was named by early settlers who felt a nearby rock promontory resembled Plymouth Rock.

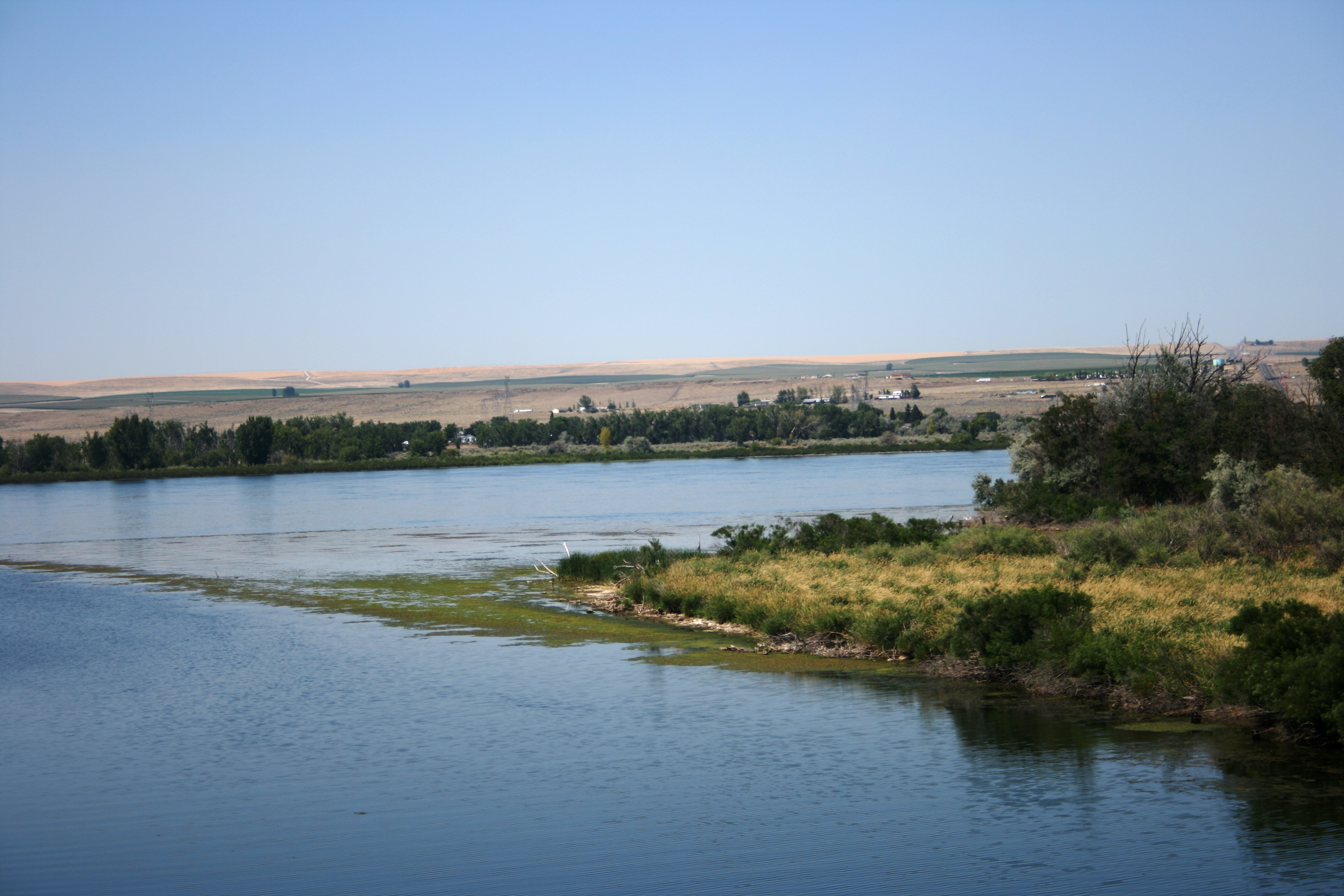
Plymouth, Washington as seen from the Oregon side of the Columbia River at the mouth of the Umatilla River.

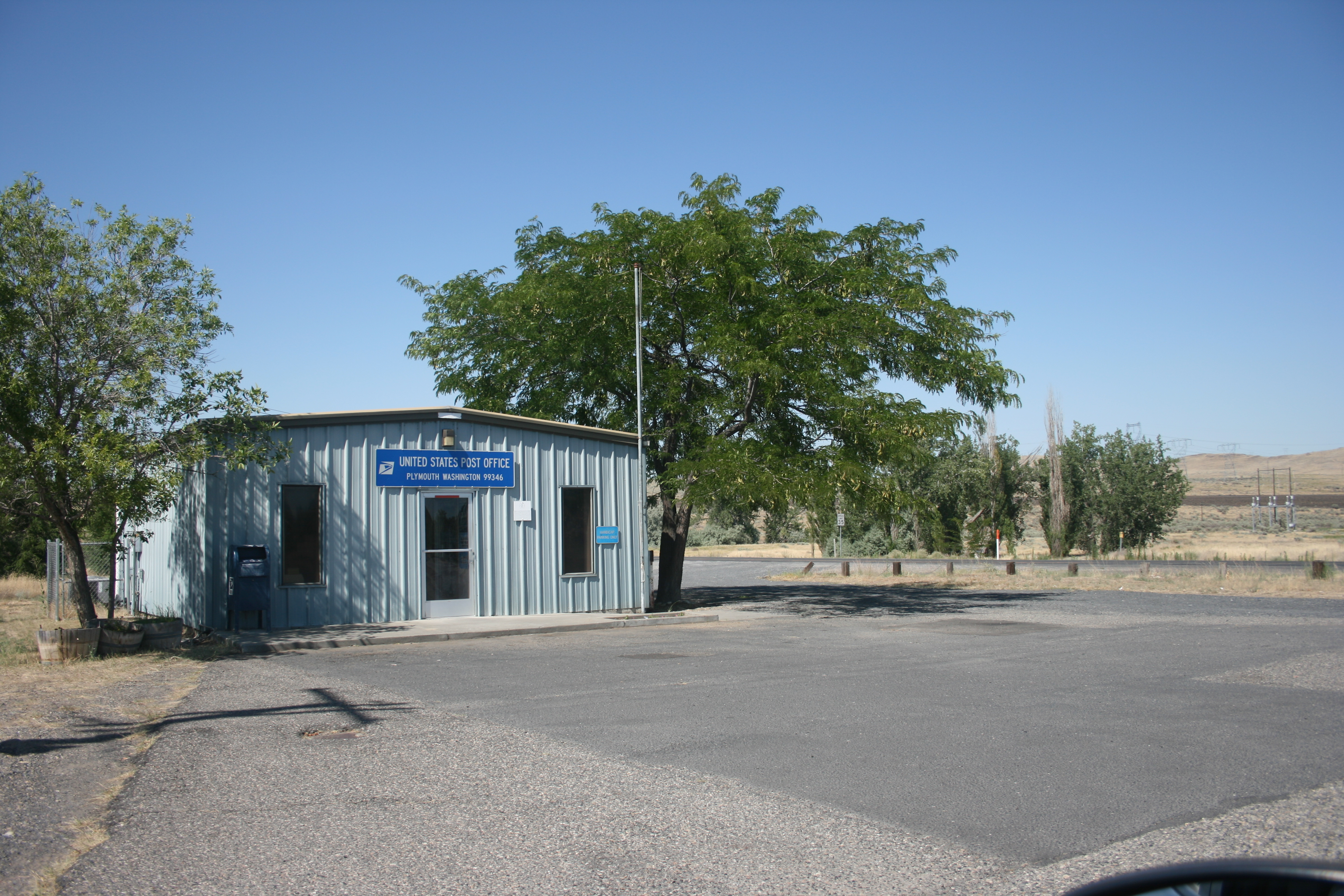
Plymouth, Washington post office as seen in July 2013.
