= Union Gap, Washington =

- City
- Motto: The old town with new ideas
- Location of Union Gap, Washington
- Coordinates: 46°33′28″N 120°30′25″W
- Country: United States
- State: Washington
- County: Yakima
- Incorporated: November 23, 1883

Government
  - Mayor: John Hodkinson
  - Councilmembers: Greg Sewell; Roger Wentz; Jack Galloway; Maira Gonzalez; Julie Schilling; Sandy Dailey

Area
  - City: 5.58 sq mi (14.46 km^{2})
  - Land: 5.58 sq mi (14.44 km^{2})
  - Water: 0.0039 sq mi (0.01 km^{2})
- Elevation: 997 ft (304 m)

Population (2020)
  - City: 6,568
  - Estimate (2023): 6,439
  - Density: 1,154.6/sq mi (445.81/km^{2})
  - Urban: 133,145
  - Metro: 256,643 (US: 193rd)
- Time zone: UTC−8 (Pacific (PST))
  - Summer (DST): UTC−7 (PDT)
- ZIP Codes: 98901, 98903
- Area code: 509
- FIPS code: 53-73290
- GNIS feature ID: 2412131
- Website: uniongapwa.gov

Union Gap is a city in Yakima County, Washington, United States. The population was 6,568 at the 2020 census. Union Gap has become the retail hub for the entire Yakima Valley as a result of Valley Mall and other thriving businesses being located here. Part of the city is within the Yakama Nation.

== Name ==
The town is named for a water gap formed by the Yakima River between the Rattlesnake Hills and Ahtanum Ridge. The gap is traversed by U.S. Route 97, Interstate 82, and Thorp Road, and the BNSF Railway.

== History ==
The city of Union Gap was originally named Yakima City and was officially incorporated on November 23, 1883. When bypassed by the Northern Pacific Railroad in December 1884, over 100 buildings were moved with rollers and horse teams to the nearby site of the depot. It was reported that business never ceased, including the bank and the courthouse, during the 4 mile move to the railroad. The new city was dubbed North Yakima. In 1918, North Yakima was renamed to simply Yakima, and the original town to the south was named Union Gap to avoid confusion between the two towns.

== Geography ==
According to the United States Census Bureau, the city has a total area of 5.58 square miles (14.45 km^{2}), of which, 5.58 square miles (14.45 km^{2}) is land and 0.01 square miles (0.03 km^{2}) is water.

== Economy ==
Liberty Bottleworks, a water bottle manufacturer, operates out of a plant in Union Gap.

== Demographics ==
Historical population
Census	Pop.	Note	%±
1880	267		—
1890	196		−26.6%
1900	287		46.4%
1910	263		−8.4%
1920	332		26.2%
1930	586		76.5%
1940	976		66.6%
1950	1,766		80.9%
1960	2,100		18.9%
1970	2,040		−2.9%
1980	3,184		56.1%
1990	3,120		−2.0%
2000	5,621		80.2%
2010	6,047		7.6%
2020	6,568		8.6%
2023 (est.)	6,439		−2.0%
U.S. Decennial Census; 2020 Census

=== Racial and ethnic composition ===
Union Gap, Washington – racial and ethnic composition Note: the US Census treats Hispanic/Latino as an ethnic category. This table excludes Latinos from the racial categories and assigns them to a separate category. Hispanics/Latinos may be of any race.
Race / ethnicity (NH = non-Hispanic)	Pop. 2000	Pop. 2010	Pop. 2020	% 2000	% 2010	% 2020
White alone (NH)	3,667	2,925	2,307	65.24%	48.37%	35.12%
Black or African American alone (NH)	23	28	46	0.41%	0.46%	0.70%
Native American or Alaska Native alone (NH)	108	112	118	1.92%	1.85%	1.80%
Asian alone (NH)	29	42	35	0.52%	0.69%	0.53%
Pacific Islander alone (NH)	5	2	5	0.09%	0.03%	0.08%
Other race alone (NH)	1	3	21	0.02%	0.05%	0.32%
Mixed race or multiracial (NH)	126	82	186	2.24%	1.36%	2.83%
Hispanic or Latino (any race)	1,662	2,853	3,850	29.57%	47.18%	58.62%
Total	5,621	6,047	6,568	100.00%	100.00%	100.00%

=== 2020 census ===
As of the 2020 census, there were 6,568 people, 2,183 households, and 1,527 families residing in the city; the median age was 33.0 years, 28.7% of residents were under the age of 18, 8.7% were under 5 years of age, and 12.7% were 65 years of age or older; for every 100 females there were 99.6 males, and for every 100 females age 18 and over there were 98.8 males age 18 and over.

Of the 2,183 households, 41.9% had children under the age of 18 living in them, 38.2% were married-couple households, 20.8% were households with a male householder and no spouse or partner present, 29.2% were households with a female householder and no spouse or partner present, 22.4% were made up of individuals, and 9.7% had someone living alone who was 65 years of age or older.

The population density was 1,177.7 inhabitants per square mile (454.7/km^{2}). There were 2,275 housing units at an average density of 407.9 inhabitants per square mile (157.5/km^{2}), of which 4.0% were vacant; the homeowner vacancy rate was 0.7% and the rental vacancy rate was 2.1%.

97.8% of residents lived in urban areas, while 2.2% lived in rural areas.

Racial composition as of the 2020 census
Race	Number	Percent
White	2,876	43.8%
Black or African American	72	1.1%
American Indian and Alaska Native	183	2.8%
Asian	38	0.6%
Native Hawaiian and Other Pacific Islander	7	0.1%
Some other race	2,349	35.8%
Two or more races	1,043	15.9%
Hispanic or Latino (of any race)	3,850	58.6%

=== 2010 census ===
As of the 2010 census, there were 6,047 people, 2,061 households, and 1,420 families living in the city. The population density was 1,197.4 inhabitants per square mile (462.3/km^{2}). There were 2,173 housing units at an average density of 430.3 inhabitants per square mile (166.1/km^{2}). The racial makeup of the city was 62.91% White, 0.91% African American, 2.61% Native American, 0.88% Asian, 0.03% Pacific Islander, 29.07% from some other races and 3.59% from two or more races. Hispanic or Latino people of any race were 47.18% of the population.

There were 2,061 households, of which 40.3% had children under the age of 18 living with them, 42.6% were married couples living together, 17.6% had a female householder with no husband present, 8.6% had a male householder with no wife present, and 31.1% were non-families. 23.5% of all households were made up of individuals, and 8.9% had someone living alone who was 65 years of age or older. The average household size was 2.90 and the average family size was 3.43.

The median age in the city was 32.7 years. 28.9% of residents were under the age of 18; 10.7% were between the ages of 18 and 24; 25.3% were from 25 to 44; 23.4% were from 45 to 64; and 11.8% were 65 years of age or older. The gender makeup of the city was 50.5% male and 49.5% female.

=== 2000 census ===
As of the 2000 census, there were 5,621 people, 2,070 households, and 1,407 families living in the city. The population density was 1,117.7 inhabitants per square mile (431.5/km^{2}). There were 2,210 housing units at an average density of 439.5 inhabitants per square mile (169.7/km^{2}). The racial makeup of the city was 72.19% White, 0.41% African American, 2.24% Native American, 0.57% Asian, 0.09% Pacific Islander, 20.17% from some other races and 4.32% from two or more races. Hispanic or Latino people of any race were 29.57% of the population.

There were 2,070 households, out of which 33.8% had children under the age of 18 living with them, 46.7% were married couples living together, 14.3% had a female householder with no husband present, and 32.0% were non-families. 26.0% of all households were made up of individuals, and 10.4% had someone living alone who was 65 years of age or older. The average household size was 2.67 and the average family size was 3.20.

In the city, the age distribution of the population shows 28.5% under the age of 18, 9.4% from 18 to 24, 28.4% from 25 to 44, 20.4% from 45 to 64, and 13.3% who were 65 years of age or older. The median age was 33 years. For every 100 females, there were 99.4 males. For every 100 females age 18 and over, there were 97.3 males.

The median income for a household in the city was $30,676, and the median income for a family was $34,795. Males had a median income of $25,802 versus $23,393 for females. The per capita income for the city was $13,102. About 14.9% of families and 18.0% of the population were below the poverty line, including 24.2% of those under age 18 and 9.9% of those age 65 or over.

== Notable people ==
Union Gap is the namesake of Gary Puckett & The Union Gap, a nationally successful pop group of the late 1960s (Puckett grew up in the adjacent city of Yakima).
