= Wapato (YTB-788) =

Tugboat of the United States Navy

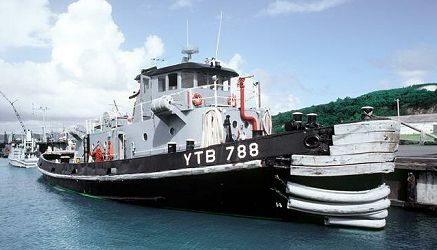
- Wapato (YTB-788)

History

United States
- Namesake: A Native American word for a bulbous root of the genus Sagittaria resembling a potato; also the city of Wapato, Washington
- Awarded: 14 January 1965
- Builder: Marinette Marine Corporation, Marinette, Wisconsin
- Laid down: 14 January 1966
- Launched: 18 April 1966
- Acquired: 21 June 1966
- Stricken: 25 April 1996
- Identification: IMO number: 8997895; MMSI number: 367082130; Callsign: WDC8133
- Fate: Sold into commercial service, 27 December 2002

General characteristics
- Class & type: Natick-class large harbor tug
- Displacement: 283 long tons (288 t) (light); 356 long tons (362 t) (full)
- Length: 109 ft (33 m)
- Beam: 31 ft (9.4 m)
- Draft: 14 ft (4.3 m)
- Installed power: 2000 horsepower (1.5 MW)
- Propulsion: one diesel engine, one screw
- Speed: 12 knots (14 mph; 22 km/h)
- Complement: 12
- Armament: none

Wapato (YTB-788) was a United States Navy Natick-class large harbor tug named for Wapato, Washington.

== Construction ==
The contract for Wapato was awarded 14 January 1965. She was laid down on 14 January 1966 at Marinette, Wisconsin, by Marinette Marine and launched 18 April 1966.

== Operational history ==
Delivered to the U.S. Navy on 21 June 1966, Wapato was assigned to the 10th Naval District and operated out of San Juan, Puerto Rico, aiding ships in berthing and docking maneuvers and providing waterfront fire protection.

Stricken on 25 April 1996, Wapato was sold on 27 December 2002.

Repowered and chartered for a time to SeaBulk Towing of Florida as Osprey, ex-Wapato is currently active in commercial service as Timothy McAllister.
