= Wapato High School =

High school in Washington State, US

Location
- 1103 S. Wasco Avenue; Wapato 98951
- Coordinates: 46°26′17″N 120°25′18″W

Information
- Type: High School
- Motto: "Empowering learners to be of value to themselves and to others, today and tomorrow"
- Established: 1957
- Principal: Luis Moreno
- Staff: 48.70 (FTE)
- Enrollment: 874 (2022-2023)
- Student to teacher ratio: 17.95
- Colors: Blue & Gold
- Mascot: Wolves
- Website: School webpage

Wapato High School is a public high school serving 874 students in grades nine through 12 located in Wapato, Washington, United States. WHS is part of the Wapato School District. The athletics team is the Wolves.

The school was constructed in the 1950s. In 2011 voters approved a $20 million bond and the state agreed to provide an additional $23 million to finance the $43 million project which will renovate and expand the existing high school to provide a 177,000 sq.ft. facility. Construction began in 2012 and was scheduled to be complete by September 2014.

== Notable alumni ==
- Deb Manjarrez, politician
- Dan Doornink, professional football player
