= Fred G. Redmon Bridge =

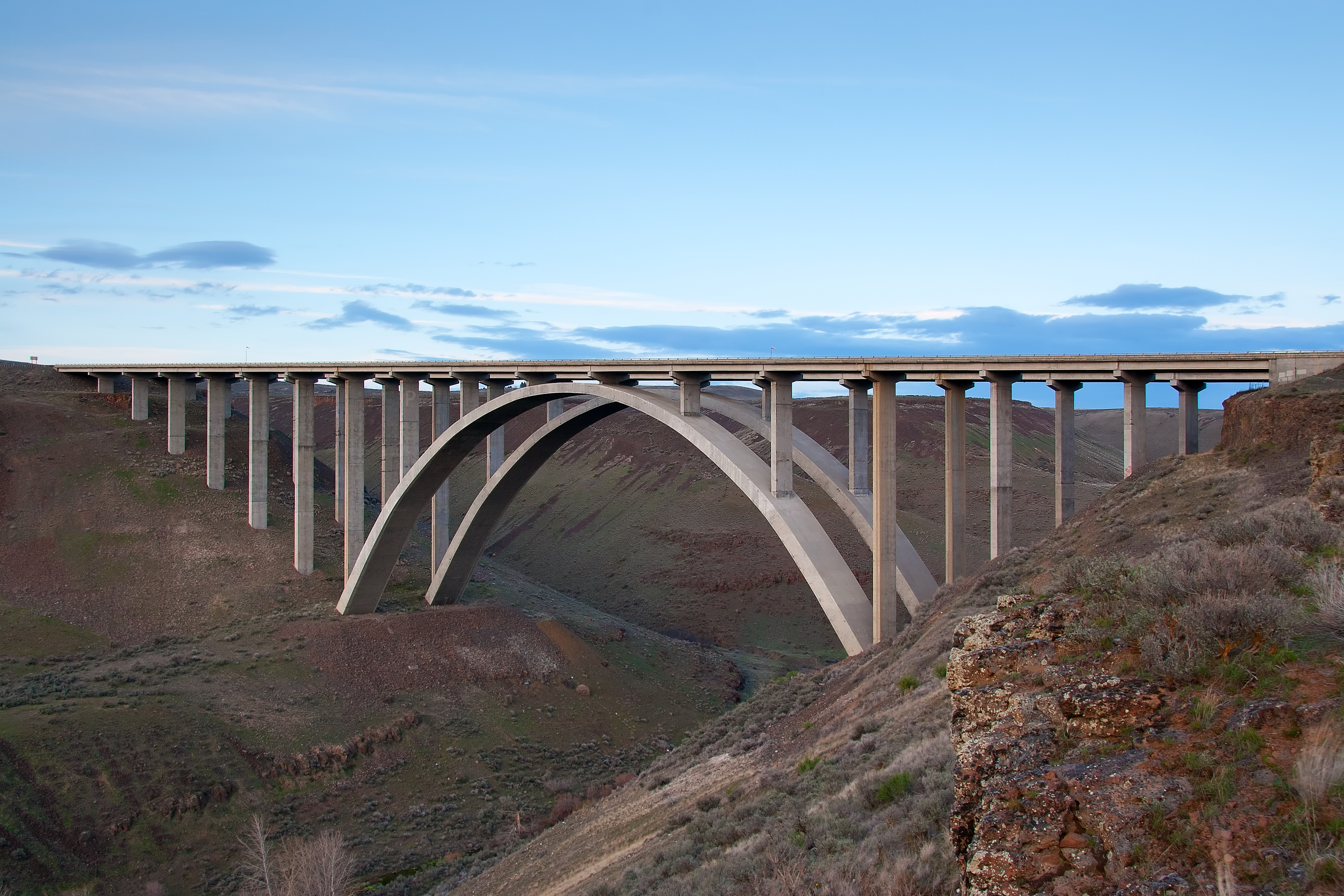
- March 2006
- Coordinates: 46.70°N 120.441°W
- Carries: I-82 / US 97
- Crosses: Selah Creek
- Locale: Yakima County, Washington

Characteristics
- Design: Twin arch
- Material: Concrete
- Total length: 1,337 feet (408 m)
- Longest span: 549 feet (167 m)
- No. of spans: 2
- Clearance below: 325 feet (99 m)

History
- Opened: November 2, 1971

Location
- Interactive map of Fred G. Redmon Bridge

Location in Washington

The Fred G. Redmon Bridge, also known as the Selah Creek Bridge, is a twin arch bridge in the northwest United States, in Yakima County, Washington. It carries Interstate 82 across Selah Creek near Selah, between Yakima and Ellensburg.

== Construction ==
The bridge was opened to traffic on November 2, 1971. It was constructed by Peter Kiewit & Sons, who won the contract with a bid of $4,356,070 (equivalent to about $40,330,000 in 2025). The bridge was part of a 2.8-mile (4.5 km) long, $1.7 million (equivalent to $15 million in 2025) segment of the Interstate 82 freeway construction through the area.

At the time it was built, it was the longest concrete arch bridge in the United States, surpassed only by the 866-foot (264 m) Sandö Bridge in Sweden. It was also the highest automobile bridge in Washington. It won the 1971 Grand Award "for excellence in the use of concrete", awarded by the Washington Aggregates and Concrete Association.

== Namesake ==
Fred Redmon was a county commissioner and the first chair of the Washington Highway Commission, formed in 1951 to oversee the state's department of highways. It was named for him prior to its completion.

== See also ==
- List of the largest arch bridges
- List of bridges in the United States by height
