= Valley Mall (Yakima) =

- Location: Union Gap, Washington, United States
- Coordinates: 46°33′56″N 120°28′45″W
- Address: 2529 Main Street
- Opened: 1972
- Owner: CenterCal Properties, LLC.
- Num. of stores: 80
- Num. of anchor tenants: 4
- Floor area: 746,000 square feet (69,300 m^{2})
- Floors: 1 (plus second floor food court)
- Website: shopatvalleymall.com

Valley Mall is a regional enclosed shopping mall located in Union Gap, Washington, serving the Yakima area. It is the region's sole indoor mall and has 55 stores, anchored by Kohl's and Macy's (formerly The Bon Marché), The mall is located on Interstate 82 and is adjacent to outdoor shopping centers called Valley Mall Plaza, Washington Plaza, and Frontage. Collectively, the property has 80 retailers.

The Valley Mall opened in 1972, under the ownership of engineering firm Morrison-Knudsen. It was purchased in 1980 by First Union Real Estate Investments for $8.9 million and later sold to Center Oak Properties in 1999. The mall was expanded by 260,000 square feet (24,000 m^{2}) in 2002, siphoning major retailers and customers from the Yakima Mall in the city's downtown. The Yakima Mall closed in 2003.

The mall's Sears store closed in December 2022 but reopened the following year.

In July 2024, it was announced that Sears would be closing again at the mall in Fall 2024.
