= Kittitas County, Washington =

County in Washington, United States

- County
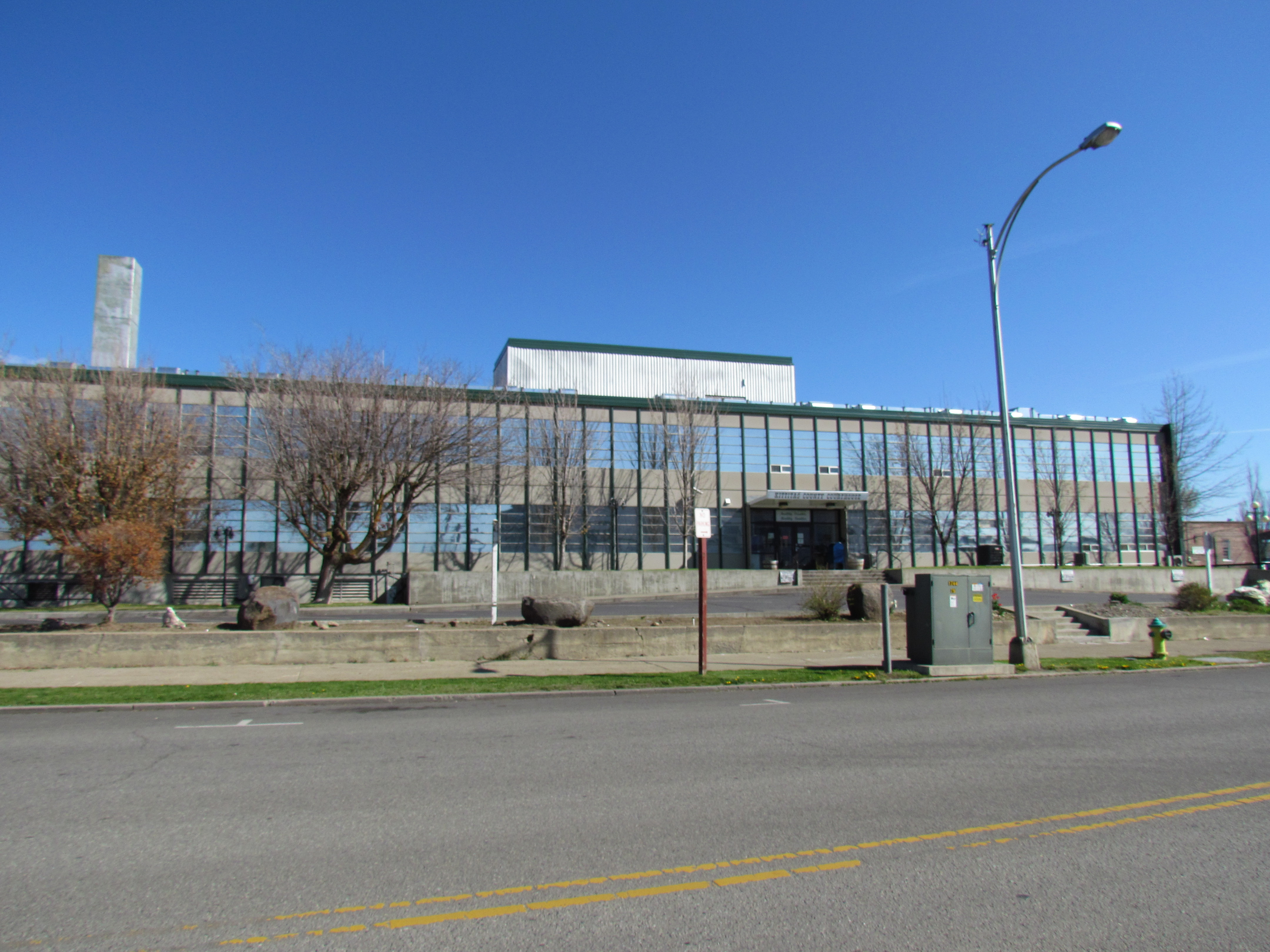
- Kittitas County Courthouse in Ellensburg

- Flag

- Location within the U.S. state of Washington
- Coordinates: 47°07′28″N 120°40′36″W
- Country: United States
- State: Washington
- Founded: November 24, 1883
- Seat: Ellensburg
- Largest city: Ellensburg

Area
  - Total: 2,333 sq mi (6,040 km^{2})
  - Land: 2,297 sq mi (5,950 km^{2})
  - Water: 36 sq mi (93 km^{2}) 1.5%

Population (2020)
  - Total: 44,337
  - Estimate (2025): 48,803 ▲
  - Density: 20/sq mi (7.7/km^{2})
- Time zone: UTC−8 (Pacific)
  - Summer (DST): UTC−7 (PDT)
- Congressional district: 8th
- Website: co.kittitas.wa.us

Kittitas County (/ˈkɪtɪtæs/) is a county located in the U.S. state of Washington. At the 2020 census, its population was 44,337. Its county seat and largest city is Ellensburg. The county was created in November 1883 when it was carved out of Yakima County. Kittitas County comprises the Ellensburg, Washington, Micropolitan Statistical Area.

There are numerous interpretations of the county's name, which is from the language of the Yakama Nation. According to one source, it "has been said to mean everything from 'white chalk' to 'shale rock' to 'shoal people' to 'land of plenty'". Most anthropologists and historians concede that each interpretation has some validity depending upon the particular dialect spoken.

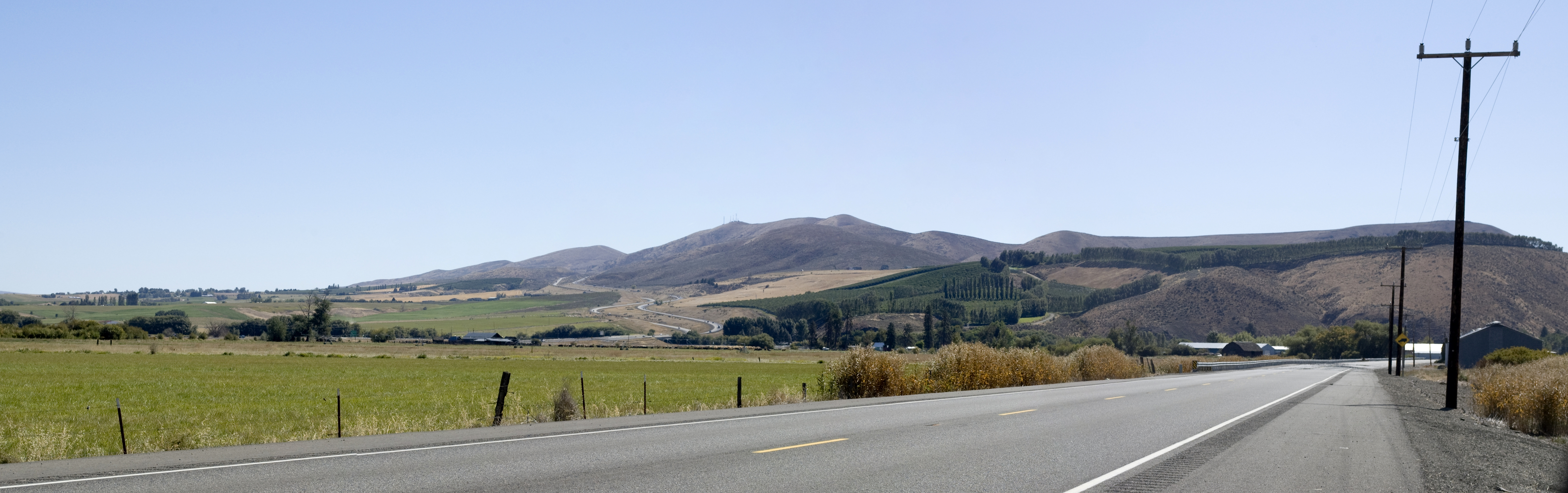
An irrigated hillside near Ellensburg

== History ==
The county was organized in November 1883 by the Washington Territorial Legislature, carved from the northern part of Yakima County.

Indigenous peoples known as Kittitas (or Upper Yakima) occupied the lands along the Yakima River for hundreds of years before the present era. The Kittitas Valley was a traditional gathering place for tribes east of the Cascades.

White settlers began pouring into the Kittitas Valley in the late 1850s. Their arrival forced the dislocation and displacement of the native inhabitants, who were eventually forced into the Yakama Indian Reservation. White settlers introduced livestock raising, crop farming, dairying, logging, lumber processing, and mining. The abundant grassland and the generally favorable terrain made beef and cattle production the county's mainstay. That was assisted by the introduction of railways into the area and the large-scale irrigation systems introduced in the 1930s.

Wheat planting in Kittitas Valley began in 1868. The county's first flour mill was established near Ellensburg in 1873. Alfalfa production was also evident in the county's early days.

Lumber extraction was an important county activity from its early days, mostly in the west end. Logging camps were established near the county's three largest lakes (Cle Elum, Kachess, Keechelus).

Mining for coal and minerals was established by the mid-1880s.

The southeastern corner of the county is part of the U.S. Army's Yakima Training Center.

== Geography ==
According to the United States Census Bureau, the county has a total area of 2,333 square miles (6,040 km^{2}), of which 2,297 square miles (5,950 km^{2}) is land and 36 square miles (93 km^{2}) (1.5%) is water. The highest point in the county is Mount Daniel at 7,959 feet (2,426 m) above mean sea level.

=== Geographic features ===
- Cascade Mountains
- Yakima River
- Manastash Ridge
- Wenatchee Mountains

=== Adjacent counties ===
- Chelan County - north
- Douglas County - northeast
- Grant County - east
- Yakima County - south
- Pierce County - west
- King County - northwest

=== National protected areas ===
- Snoqualmie National Forest (part)
- Wenatchee National Forest (part)

=== Flora and fauna ===
There are a variety of species represented within Kittitas County. These include a diversity of grasses, herbs, trees, birds, mammals and amphibians. The genus of ricegrass known as Oryzopsis was one of the earliest grasses classified within the county. Among the amphibian species found are the Cascades frog and the rough-skinned newt, the latter being a common far western USA taxon; in fact, examples of neoteny have been found in individual newts of this species within the county.

== Demographics ==
Historical population
Census	Pop.	Note	%±
1890	8,777		—
1900	9,704		10.6%
1910	18,561		91.3%
1920	17,737		−4.4%
1930	18,154		2.4%
1940	20,230		11.4%
1950	22,235		9.9%
1960	20,467		−8.0%
1970	25,039		22.3%
1980	24,877		−0.6%
1990	26,725		7.4%
2000	33,362		24.8%
2010	40,915		22.6%
2020	44,337		8.4%
2025 (est.)	48,803	▲	10.1%
U.S. Decennial Census; 1790–1960 1900–1990; 1990–2000 2010–2020

=== 2020 census ===
As of the 2020 census, the county had a population of 44,337. Of the residents, 18.5% were under the age of 18 and 18.5% were 65 years of age or older; the median age was 37.2 years. For every 100 females there were 101.4 males, and for every 100 females age 18 and over there were 101.2 males. 57.2% of residents lived in urban areas and 42.8% lived in rural areas.

Kittitas County, Washington – Racial and ethnic composition Note: the US Census treats Hispanic/Latino as an ethnic category. This table excludes Latinos from the racial categories and assigns them to a separate category. Hispanics/Latinos may be of any race.
Race / Ethnicity (NH = Non-Hispanic)	Pop 2000	Pop 2010	Pop 2020	% 2000	% 2010	% 2020
White alone (NH)	29,825	35,214	35,323	89.40%	86.07%	79.67%
Black or African American alone (NH)	227	339	380	0.68%	0.83%	0.86%
Native American or Alaska Native alone (NH)	287	353	407	0.86%	0.86%	0.92%
Asian alone (NH)	714	795	907	2.14%	1.94%	2.05%
Pacific Islander alone (NH)	44	56	87	0.13%	0.14%	0.20%
Other race alone (NH)	54	52	246	0.16%	0.13%	0.55%
Mixed race or Multiracial (NH)	543	985	2,393	1.63%	2.41%	5.40%
Hispanic or Latino (any race)	1,668	3,121	4,594	5.00%	7.63%	10.36%
Total	33,362	40,915	44,337	100.00%	100.00%	100.00%

The racial makeup of the county was 82.3% White, 0.9% Black or African American, 1.2% American Indian and Alaska Native, 2.1% Asian, 4.9% from some other race, and 8.3% from two or more races. Hispanic or Latino residents of any race comprised 10.4% of the population.

There were 18,650 households in the county, of which 23.8% had children under the age of 18 living with them and 24.8% had a female householder with no spouse or partner present. About 29.7% of all households were made up of individuals and 11.6% had someone living alone who was 65 years of age or older.

There were 23,743 housing units, of which 21.5% were vacant. Among occupied housing units, 60.8% were owner-occupied and 39.2% were renter-occupied. The homeowner vacancy rate was 1.2% and the rental vacancy rate was 7.2%.

=== 2010 census ===
As of the 2010 census, there were 40,915 people, 16,595 households, and 9,225 families living in the county. The population density was 17.8 inhabitants per square mile (6.9/km^{2}). There were 21,900 housing units at an average density of 9.5 units per square mile (3.7 units/km^{2}). The racial makeup of the county was 89.3% white, 2.0% Asian, 1.0% American Indian, 0.9% black or African American, 0.1% Pacific islander, 3.7% from other races, and 3.0% from two or more races. Those of Hispanic or Latino origin made up 7.6% of the population. In terms of ancestry, 26.2% were German, 15.4% were Irish, 12.7% were English, 8.2% were Norwegian, 5.1% were Italian, 5.0% were Swedish, and 3.4% were American.

Of the 16,595 households, 24.1% had children under the age of 18 living with them, 44.7% were married couples living together, 7.3% had a female householder with no husband present, 44.4% were non-families, and 28.7% of all households were made up of individuals. The average household size was 2.32 and the average family size was 2.87. The median age was 31.9 years.

The median income for a household in the county was $41,232 and the median income for a family was $61,276. Males had a median income of $45,916 versus $35,380 for females. The per capita income for the county was $23,467. About 10.3% of families and 21.2% of the population were below the poverty line, including 19.8% of those under age 18 and 7.0% of those age 65 or over.

=== 2000 census ===
As of the 2000 census, there were 33,362 people, 13,382 households, and 7,788 families living in the county. The population density was 14 people per square mile (5.4 people/km^{2}). There were 16,475 housing units at an average density of 7 units per square mile (2.7 units/km^{2}). The racial makeup of the county was 91.77% White, 0.71% Black or African American, 0.91% Native American, 2.19% Asian, 0.15% Pacific Islander, 2.30% from other races, and 1.97% from two or more races. 5.00% of the population were Hispanic or Latino of any race. 19.4% were of German, 11.7% English, 9.0% Irish, 7.8% United States or American, 6.6% Norwegian, 3.8% Italian, 3.2% Swedish, 3.1% French, 3.0% Dutch, 1.7% Polish, and 1.3% Danish ancestry. 93.2% spoke English and 4.5% Spanish as their first language.

There were 13,382 households, out of which 26.20% had children under the age of 18 living with them, 47.80% were married couples living together, 7.20% had a female householder with no husband present, and 41.80% were non-families. 28.40% of all households were made up of individuals, and 8.60% had someone living alone who was 65 years of age or older. The average household size was 2.33 and the average family size was 2.90.

In the county, the population was spread out, with 20.60% under the age of 18, 21.60% from 18 to 24, 24.60% from 25 to 44, 21.60% from 45 to 64, and 11.60% who were 65 years of age or older. The median age was 31 years. For every 100 females there were 98.70 males. For every 100 females age 18 and over, there were 97.20 males.

The median income for a household in the county was $32,546, and the median income for a family was $46,057. Males had a median income of $36,257 versus $25,640 for females. The per capita income for the county was $18,928. About 10.50% of families and 19.60% of the population were below the poverty line, including 15.60% of those under age 18 and 8.20% of those age 65 or over.

== Government and politics ==
United States presidential election results for Kittitas County, Washington
Year	Republican		Democratic		Third party(ies)	
Year	No.	%	No.	%	No.	%
1892	855	37.83%	800	35.40%	605	26.77%
1896	1,044	43.39%	1,336	55.53%	26	1.08%
1900	1,139	52.88%	934	43.36%	81	3.76%
1904	1,787	64.86%	523	18.98%	445	16.15%
1908	1,752	56.23%	985	31.61%	379	12.16%
1912	1,157	22.44%	1,407	27.29%	2,592	50.27%
1916	2,310	43.74%	2,609	49.40%	362	6.85%
1920	2,837	54.54%	1,119	21.51%	1,246	23.95%
1924	2,360	47.22%	455	9.10%	2,183	43.68%
1928	3,207	59.48%	2,136	39.61%	49	0.91%
1932	1,963	29.37%	4,266	63.82%	455	6.81%
1936	1,941	26.89%	5,044	69.88%	233	3.23%
1940	3,401	39.27%	5,203	60.08%	56	0.65%
1944	3,423	44.54%	4,227	55.00%	36	0.47%
1948	3,446	41.28%	4,588	54.96%	314	3.76%
1952	5,201	56.69%	3,937	42.91%	36	0.39%
1956	5,097	57.72%	3,726	42.20%	7	0.08%
1960	4,640	51.83%	4,303	48.06%	10	0.11%
1964	3,200	37.24%	5,383	62.65%	9	0.10%
1968	4,212	48.25%	3,921	44.92%	596	6.83%
1972	5,464	53.96%	4,299	42.46%	363	3.58%
1976	4,765	47.57%	4,858	48.50%	394	3.93%
1980	5,359	49.86%	4,075	37.91%	1,314	12.23%
1984	6,580	57.06%	4,830	41.89%	121	1.05%
1988	5,048	48.09%	5,318	50.67%	130	1.24%
1992	4,078	32.93%	5,432	43.86%	2,875	23.21%
1996	5,224	41.58%	5,707	45.42%	1,633	13.00%
2000	7,727	54.86%	5,516	39.16%	843	5.98%
2004	9,052	56.28%	6,731	41.85%	301	1.87%
2008	9,471	53.01%	8,030	44.94%	367	2.05%
2012	9,782	53.83%	7,949	43.75%	440	2.42%
2016	10,100	51.49%	7,489	38.18%	2,026	10.33%
2020	14,105	53.50%	11,421	43.32%	838	3.18%
2024	14,645	55.27%	10,810	40.79%	1,044	3.94%

Kittitas County has been a Republican-leaning county since the turn of the 21st Century; prior to that, it was a swing county.

Kittitas County is directed by a three-member Board of Commissioners.

The current County Commissioners are:

- District 1: Cory Wright (term: January 1, 2025, to December 31, 2028)
- District 2: Laura Osiadacz (term: January 1, 2025, to December 31, 2028)
- District 3: Brett Wachsmith (term: January 1, 2023 - December 31, 2026)

In presidential elections, it is a conservative county that has voted for the Republican candidate in the majority since the beginning of the 21st century.

== Transportation ==
Kittitas County is bisected by several major highways, including two Interstate Highways: Interstate 82 connects Ellensburg to the Yakima Valley and crosses over the Manastash Ridge; and Interstate 90 carries east–west traffic and crosses the Cascades at Snoqualmie Pass west of Cle Elum. U.S. Route 97 travels north–south from Yakima to the Wenatchee Valley with onward connections to the British Columbia Interior in the north and Central Oregon to the south.

The city government of Ellensburg operates Central Transit, the largest public transit system in the county. It has five routes that operate on weekdays and weekends, with the exception of major federal holidays, as well as paratransit and on-demand medical transport. The system is fare-free and primarily funded by a sales tax within the designated public transportation benefit area. Central Transit also partners with HopeSource, a non-profit organization, to operate the Kittitas County Connector, which connects Ellensburg to outlying communities in the county. The service launched in 2019 with service to Cle Elum and Roslyn and was expanded to Kittitas in 2025.

Several intercity bus operators also serve stops in Kittitas County, including FlixBus and the Travel Washington Apple Line. Yakima Transit also provides intercity commuter service from Ellensburg to Yakima with a state grant.

== Communities ==
=== Cities ===
- Cle Elum
- Ellensburg (county seat)
- Kittitas
- Roslyn

=== Town ===
- South Cle Elum

=== Ghost towns ===
- Liberty

=== Census-designated places ===
- Easton
- Ronald
- Snoqualmie Pass (including Hyak)
- Thorp
- Vantage

=== Unincorporated communities ===
- Suncadia
- Teanaway
- Thrall

== Events ==
- The Kittitas County Fair and Ellensburg Rodeo occur every Labor Day Weekend. The Kittitas County Fair began in 1885, and moved to its current location (North Maple and East 8th Avenue in Ellensburg) in 1923.

== Sister cities ==
Kittitas County has one sister city:

- Sanda City, Japan (since 1992)

== See also ==
- National Register of Historic Places listings in Kittitas County, Washington
