= Thrall, Washington =

Unincorporated community in Washington, US

- Unincorporated community
- Location within Washington (state) Location within the United States
- Coordinates: 46°55′49″N 120°30′40″W
- Country: United States
- State: Washington
- County: Kittitas
- Time zone: UTC-8 (Pacific (PST))
  - Summer (DST): UTC-7 (PDT)
- Area code: 509
- GNIS feature ID: 1511370

Thrall is an unincorporated community in Kittitas County, in the U.S. state of Washington.

== History ==
A post office called Thrall was established in 1911, and remained in operation until 1915. The community bears the name of a railroad worker.
