= Outlook, Washington =

Unincorporated community in Washington, United States

- Unincorporated community and CDP
- Location within Yakima County Location within Washington (state)
- Coordinates: 46°19′52″N 120°05′34″W
- Country: United States
- State: Washington
- County: Yakima

Government
  - Type: Census Designated Place
- Elevation: 778 ft (237 m)

Population (2020)
  - Total: 317
- Time zone: UTC-8 (Pacific (PST))
  - Summer (DST): UTC-7 (PDT)
- ZIP code: 98938
- Area code: 509
- GNIS feature ID: 2585016

Outlook is a census-designated place and unincorporated community in Yakima County, Washington, United States. As of the 2020 census, Outlook had a population of 317. Outlook is located along Interstate 82 and U.S. Route 12 4 miles (6.4 km) west of Sunnyside. Outlook has a post office with ZIP code 98938.

== Notable Citizens ==
Astronaut Bonnie Dunbar was born in Valley Memorial Hospital in Sunnyside, Washington, but she grew up in Outlook. Dunbar wrote in her oral history that "the school I started out in, Outlook Elementary, went to eight grades. It was a very small rural school. I think there were probably twenty-two, twenty-three in my class all the way through eighth grade graduation."

Internet cartoonist Scott Meyer was born and raised in Outlook.

== Demographics ==
Historical population
Census	Pop.	Note	%±
2010	292		—
2020	317		8.6%
U.S. Decennial Census; 2000 2010

Outlook first appeared as a census designated place in the 2010 U.S. census.

=== Racial and ethnic composition ===
Outlook CDP, Washington – Racial and ethnic composition Note: the US Census treats Hispanic/Latino as an ethnic category. This table excludes Latinos from the racial categories and assigns them to a separate category. Hispanics/Latinos may be of any race.
Race / Ethnicity (NH = Non-Hispanic)	Pop 2010	Pop 2020	% 2010	% 2020
White alone (NH)	39	34	13.36%	10.73%
Black or African American alone (NH)	1	0	0.34%	0.00%
Native American or Alaska Native alone (NH)	0	1	0.00%	0.32%
Asian alone (NH)	1	0	0.34%	0.00%
Native Hawaiian or Pacific Islander alone (NH)	0	0	0.00%	0.00%
Other race alone (NH)	0	0	0.00%	0.00%
Mixed race or Multiracial (NH)	7	4	2.40%	1.26%
Hispanic or Latino (any race)	244	278	83.56%	87.70%
Total	292	317	100.00%	100.00%
