= Terrace Heights, Washington =

- CDP
- Location of Terrace Heights, Washington
- Coordinates: 46°37′24″N 120°28′14″W
- Country: United States
- State: Washington
- County: Yakima

Area
  - Total: 8.2 sq mi (21.2 km^{2})
  - Land: 7.9 sq mi (20.5 km^{2})
  - Water: 0.31 sq mi (0.8 km^{2})
- Elevation: 1,155 ft (352 m)

Population (2020)
  - Total: 9,244
  - Density: 816/sq mi (315.2/km^{2})
- Time zone: UTC-8 (Pacific (PST))
  - Summer (DST): UTC-7 (PDT)
- ZIP code: 98901
- Area code: 509
- FIPS code: 53-70805
- GNIS feature ID: 2410069

Terrace Heights is a census-designated place (CDP) in Yakima County, Washington, United States. The population was 9,244 at the 2020 census. It is essentially a suburb of the city of Yakima.

== Geography ==
According to the United States Census Bureau, the CDP has a total area of 8.2 square miles (21.2 km^{2}), of which, 7.9 square miles (20.5 km^{2}) of it is land and 0.3 square miles (0.8 km^{2}) of it (3.66%) is water.

== Demographics ==
Historical population
Census	Pop.	Note	%±
1970	1,033		—
1980	3,199		209.7%
1990	4,223		32.0%
2000	6,447		52.7%
2010	6,937		7.6%
2020	9,244		33.3%
U.S. Decennial Census; 1960 1970 1980 1990; 2000 2010 2020

Terrace Heights first appeared as an unincorporated place in the 1970 U.S. census; and as a census designated place in the 1980 U.S. census.

=== 2007 American Community Survey ===
As of the census of 2007, there were 8,031 people, 3,754 households, and 2,005 families residing in the CDP. The population density was 816.3 people per square mile (315.1/km^{2}). There were 2,609 housing units at an average density of 330.3/sq mi (127.5/km^{2}). The racial makeup of the CDP was 88.58% White, 0.84% African American, 1.13% Native American, 0.51% Asian, 0.02% Pacific Islander, 6.03% from other races, and 2.89% from two or more races. Hispanic or Latino of any race were 11.06% of the population.

There were 3,754 households, out of which 31.4% had children under the age of 18 living with them, 62.0% were married couples living together, 8.7% had a female householder with no husband present, and 26.0% were non-families. 20.9% of all households were made up of individuals, and 8.3% had someone living alone who was 65 years of age or older. The average household size was 2.54 and the average family size was 2.93.

In the CDP, the age distribution of the population shows 24.4% under the age of 18, 7.1% from 18 to 24, 27.1% from 25 to 44, 26.7% from 45 to 64, and 14.7% who were 65 years of age or older. The median age was 40 years. For every 100 females, there were 94.9 males. For every 100 females age 18 and over, there were 93.8 males.

The median income for a household in the CDP was $47,601, and the median income for a family was $53,938. Males had a median income of $39,813 versus $26,925 for females. The per capita income for the CDP was $21,542. About 5.3% of families and 7.5% of the population were below the poverty line, including 7.1% of those under age 18 and 6.0% of those age 65 or over.
