= Buena, Washington =

Unincorporated community in Washington, United States

- Unincorporated community
- Location within Yakima County Location within Washington (state)
- Coordinates: 46°25′40″N 120°19′06″W
- Country: United States
- State: Washington
- County: Yakima
- Elevation: 791 ft (241 m)

Population (2020)
  - Total: 1,048
- Time zone: UTC-8 (Pacific (PST))
  - Summer (DST): UTC-7 (PDT)
- ZIP code: 98921
- Area code: 509
- GNIS feature ID: 2584952

Buena (/bjuːˈɛnə/) is an unincorporated community in Yakima County, Washington, with a 2020 census population of 1048. In the 2010 census, the population was 990, and the community was not recognized in the 2000 census figures. Buena is 3.5 miles (5.6 km) north of Toppenish. Buena has a post office with ZIP code 98921.

The settlement was originally named Springdale for a nearby spring, but its name was changed to Jonathan in 1918 to avoid conflicting with an existing Springdale when a post office was created. The Northern Pacific Railway constructed a siding through Jonathan in 1919 and named it Buena (Spanish for "good") with an Anglicized pronunciation.

== Demographics ==
Historical population
| Census | Pop. | Note | %± |
|---|---|---|---|
| 2010 | 990 | | — |
| 2020 | 1,048 | | 5.9% |
U.S. Decennial Census; 2000 2010

Buena first appeared as a census designated place in the 2010 U.S. census.

=== Racial and ethnic composition ===
Buena CDP, Washington – Racial and ethnic composition Note: the US Census treats Hispanic/Latino as an ethnic category. This table excludes Latinos from the racial categories and assigns them to a separate category. Hispanics/Latinos may be of any race.
| Race / Ethnicity (NH = Non-Hispanic) | Pop 2010 | Pop 2020 | % 2010 | % 2020 |
|---|---|---|---|---|
| White alone (NH) | 137 | 108 | 13.84% | 10.31% |
| Black or African American alone (NH) | 1 | 0 | 0.10% | 0.00% |
| Native American or Alaska Native alone (NH) | 22 | 17 | 2.22% | 1.62% |
| Asian alone (NH) | 3 | 2 | 0.30% | 0.19% |
| Native Hawaiian or Pacific Islander alone (NH) | 1 | 3 | 0.10% | 0.29% |
| Other race alone (NH) | 8 | 1 | 0.81% | 0.10% |
| Mixed race or Multiracial (NH) | 13 | 20 | 1.31% | 1.91% |
| Hispanic or Latino (any race) | 805 | 897 | 81.31% | 85.59% |
| Total | 990 | 1,048 | 100.00% | 100.00% |
