= Wapato, Washington =

- City
- Wapato Avenue
- Interactive location map of Wapato
- Coordinates: 46°26′37″N 120°25′17″W
- Country: United States
- State: Washington
- County: Yakima
- Founded: 1885
- Incorporated: September 16, 1908

Government
  - Type: Mayor–council
  - Mayor: Margaret Estrada

Area
  - Total: 1.15 sq mi (2.99 km^{2})
  - Land: 1.15 sq mi (2.99 km^{2})
  - Water: 0 sq mi (0.00 km^{2})
- Elevation: 853 ft (260 m)

Population (2020)
  - Total: 4,607
  - Estimate (2022): 4,513
  - Density: 4,334.1/sq mi (1,673.42/km^{2})
- Time zone: UTC-8 (Pacific (PST))
  - Summer (DST): UTC-7 (PDT)
- ZIP code: 98951
- Area code: 509
- FIPS code: 53-76125
- GNIS feature ID: 2412178
- Website: wapato-city.org

Wapato (/ˈwɑːpʌtoʊ/) is a town in Yakima County, Washington, United States. The population was 4,607 at the 2020 census. It has a Hispanic majority.

== History ==
=== Origins ===
The town was founded in 1885 by Indian Postmaster Alexander McCredy as a railroad stop on the Northern Pacific Railroad as Simcoe, Washington. The Dawes Severalty Act of 1887 allowed the government to subdivide the Yakama Indian Reservation tribal communal landholdings into allotments for Native American heads of families and individuals. The selling of these allotments drew settlers into the area. With the construction of the Irwin Canal in 1896, agriculture became the big business in town. In the early 1900s, McCredy and George Rankin established the Wapato Development Company and laid out the town site. They established the town's first bank and began selling lots. In response to persistent confusion with nearby Fort Simcoe, the town changed its name to Wapato in 1903. The 1906 Jones Act further encouraged Anglos to purchase land from the Yakamas. Wapato was officially incorporated on September 16, 1908, with a population of around 300 people.

The name wapato comes from the Chinook Jargon word for an edible root, probably originally derived from the Upper Chinook language.

=== Japanese and African American residents ===
As early as 1905, many Japanese people also began to migrate to the city, mainly from Hawaii. From 1916 to 1918, "Japanese Town" developed along present-day West 2nd Street. With more than 1,000 Japanese then living in the Yakima Valley, the community soon became a center of Washington's Japanese population, second only to Seattle. The Yakima Buddhist Bussei Kaikan (1936–1941), on West 2nd Street, was an architecturally noteworthy building built by members of the congregation.

A mob including police attacked dozens of African Americans at a railroad camp in Wapato on July 9, 1938. African American residents in town were also driven out. After World War II broke out, Wapato's Japanese language school (which had about 200 students) and several Japanese residences were burned by arsonists. Executive Order 9066 forced the Japanese to evacuate from Wapato in 1942 and many residents were sent to internment camps.

=== World War II ===
During World War II, much of the labor in the orchards and fields around Wapato came from either Germans held in a POW camp between Wapato and Toppenish, or from Japanese still being held in internment camps. At the end of the war, a labor shortage created a void readily filled by Hispanic migrant workers, and the Bracero Program (a guest-worker program agreed to by the US and Mexico during World War II). These events significantly changed Wapato's cultural history.

=== Post war through today ===
Through the 1970s and into 1990, Wapato produced some of the largest volume potato and apple crops, as tonnage per acre.

Today, Wapato boasts one of the most Hispanic populations in Washington State (76% in the 2000 census). In recent times both Anglo and Hispanic residents have described Wapato as a "Mexican Town".

In 2012, Wapato allowed strip clubs into the city, in the words of one resident, "to put Wapato on the map."

== Geography ==
According to the United States Census Bureau, the city has a total area of 1.17 square miles (3.03 km^{2}), all land. The community is within the external boundaries of the Yakama Indian Reservation.

=== Climate ===
According to the Köppen Climate Classification system, Wapato has a cold semi-arid climate, abbreviated "BSk" on climate maps.

Climate data for Wapato (1991–2020 normals, extremes 1915–2013)
Month	Jan	Feb	Mar	Apr	May	Jun	Jul	Aug	Sep	Oct	Nov	Dec	Year
Record high °F (°C)	68 (20)	72 (22)	86 (30)	94 (34)	102 (39)	104 (40)	110 (43)	106 (41)	101 (38)	89 (32)	75 (24)	68 (20)	110 (43)
Mean maximum °F (°C)	57.1 (13.9)	60.1 (15.6)	70.9 (21.6)	80.4 (26.9)	90.2 (32.3)	95.6 (35.3)	101.7 (38.7)	100.2 (37.9)	93.2 (34.0)	80.5 (26.9)	64.7 (18.2)	55.4 (13.0)	102.4 (39.1)
Mean daily maximum °F (°C)	39.3 (4.1)	47.5 (8.6)	56.9 (13.8)	65.2 (18.4)	74.5 (23.6)	81.2 (27.3)	90.2 (32.3)	88.8 (31.6)	80.3 (26.8)	65.9 (18.8)	49.5 (9.7)	38.5 (3.6)	64.8 (18.2)
Daily mean °F (°C)	31.8 (−0.1)	36.9 (2.7)	44.8 (7.1)	52.0 (11.1)	60.5 (15.8)	67.2 (19.6)	74.7 (23.7)	73.2 (22.9)	64.5 (18.1)	51.6 (10.9)	39.1 (3.9)	30.9 (−0.6)	52.3 (11.3)
Mean daily minimum °F (°C)	24.4 (−4.2)	26.3 (−3.2)	32.6 (0.3)	38.7 (3.7)	46.6 (8.1)	53.3 (11.8)	59.2 (15.1)	57.7 (14.3)	48.8 (9.3)	37.3 (2.9)	28.7 (−1.8)	23.3 (−4.8)	39.7 (4.3)
Mean minimum °F (°C)	9.1 (−12.7)	14.4 (−9.8)	22.0 (−5.6)	28.6 (−1.9)	33.0 (0.6)	41.4 (5.2)	46.6 (8.1)	46.3 (7.9)	39.2 (4.0)	24.0 (−4.4)	15.6 (−9.1)	10.1 (−12.2)	2.1 (−16.6)
Record low °F (°C)	−22 (−30)	−21 (−29)	6 (−14)	18 (−8)	26 (−3)	33 (1)	36 (2)	35 (2)	23 (−5)	12 (−11)	−9 (−23)	−27 (−33)	−27 (−33)
Average precipitation inches (mm)	1.10 (28)	0.61 (15)	0.56 (14)	0.56 (14)	0.83 (21)	0.54 (14)	0.24 (6.1)	0.23 (5.8)	0.23 (5.8)	0.64 (16)	0.92 (23)	1.36 (35)	7.82 (199)
Average snowfall inches (cm)	5.2 (13)	1.1 (2.8)	0.3 (0.76)	0.0 (0.0)	0.0 (0.0)	0.0 (0.0)	0.0 (0.0)	0.0 (0.0)	0.0 (0.0)	0.2 (0.51)	1.6 (4.1)	12.0 (30)	20.4 (52)
Average precipitation days (≥ 0.01 in)	8.5	5.9	5.6	5.2	6.4	4.5	2.6	2.2	3.1	5.9	8.2	9.5	67.6
Average snowy days (≥ 0.1 in)	3.5	0.9	0.2	0.0	0.0	0.0	0.0	0.0	0.0	0.1	0.7	3.7	9.1
Source 1: NOAA
Source 2: WRCC

== Demographics ==
Historical population
Census	Pop.	Note	%±
1910	400		—
1920	1,128		182.0%
1930	1,222		8.3%
1940	1,483		21.4%
1950	3,185		114.8%
1960	3,137		−1.5%
1970	2,841		−9.4%
1980	3,307		16.4%
1990	3,795		14.8%
2000	4,582		20.7%
2010	4,997		9.1%
2020	4,607		−7.8%
2022 (est.)	4,513		−2.0%
U.S. Decennial Census; 2020 Census

For decades Wapato attracted Filipino Americans, Hispanic Americans, Japanese Americans, and Native Americans. Older white residents died and entered nursing homes in larger cities, while younger whites moved to attend school and did not return to the community. Hispanic immigrants arrived for agricultural jobs and the small town lifestyle. In 1952, the Filipino community established the Yakima Valley Filipino Community Hall in Wapato, the first facility of its kind in the Western United States. The building was added to the National Register of Historic Places in 2024.

=== 2020 census ===
As of the 2020 census, Wapato had a population of 4,607. The median age was 29.4 years. 32.7% of residents were under the age of 18 and 9.7% of residents were 65 years of age or older. For every 100 females there were 98.7 males, and for every 100 females age 18 and over there were 94.1 males age 18 and over.

100.0% of residents lived in urban areas, while 0.0% lived in rural areas.

There were 1,261 households in Wapato, of which 56.1% had children under the age of 18 living in them. Of all households, 44.2% were married-couple households, 17.8% were households with a male householder and no spouse or partner present, and 28.2% were households with a female householder and no spouse or partner present. About 13.7% of all households were made up of individuals and 3.8% had someone living alone who was 65 years of age or older.

There were 1,322 housing units, of which 4.6% were vacant. The homeowner vacancy rate was 0.8% and the rental vacancy rate was 2.6%.

Racial composition as of the 2020 census
Race	Number	Percent
White	662	14.4%
Black or African American	17	0.4%
American Indian and Alaska Native	421	9.1%
Asian	117	2.5%
Native Hawaiian and Other Pacific Islander	8	0.2%
Some other race	2,610	56.7%
Two or more races	772	16.8%
Hispanic or Latino (of any race)	3,948	85.7%

=== 2010 census ===
As of the 2010 census, there were 4,997 people, 1,240 households, and 1,045 families living in the city. The population density was 4,270.9 inhabitants per square mile (1,649.0/km^{2}). There were 1,293 housing units at an average density of 1,105.1 per square mile (426.7/km^{2}). The racial makeup of the city was 17.2% White, 0.3% African American, 6.6% Native American, 1.3% Asian, 0.1% Pacific Islander, 70.6% from other races, and 3.9% from two or more races. Hispanic or Latino of any race were 84.2% of the population.

There were 1,240 households, of which 64.7% had children under the age of 18 living with them, 51.1% were married couples living together, 22.7% had a female householder with no husband present, 10.4% had a male householder with no wife present, and 15.7% were non-families. 11.7% of all households were made up of individuals, and 5.3% had someone living alone who was 65 years of age or older. The average household size was 3.88 and the average family size was 4.12.

The median age in the city was 24.9 years. 37% of residents were under the age of 18; 13.1% were between the ages of 18 and 24; 27.2% were from 25 to 44; 16.1% were from 45 to 64; and 6.7% were 65 years of age or older. The gender makeup of the city was 50.5% male and 49.5% female.

=== 2000 census ===
As of the 2000 census, there were 4,582 people, 1,198 households, and 971 families living in the city. The population density was 4,725.2 people per square mile (1,823.8/km^{2}). There were 1,267 housing units at an average density of 1,306.6 per square mile (504.3/km^{2}). The racial makeup of the city was 25.51% White, 0.50% African American, 9.34% Native American, 1.53% Asian, 57.57% from other races, and 5.54% from two or more races. Hispanic or Latino of any race were 76.21% of the population.

There were 1,198 households, out of which 53.3% had children under the age of 18 living with them, 53.6% were married couples living together, 19.2% had a female householder with no husband present, and 18.9% were non-families. 15.5% of all households were made up of individuals, and 7.7% had someone living alone who was 65 years of age or older. The average household size was 3.73 and the average family size was 4.10.

In the city, the age distribution of the population shows 38.2% under the age of 18, 12.1% from 18 to 24, 26.5% from 25 to 44, 14.7% from 45 to 64, and 8.4% who were 65 years of age or older. The median age was 25 years. For every 100 females, there were 104.7 males. For every 100 females age 18 and over, there were 102.2 males.

The median income for a household in the city was $25,804, and the median income for a family was $26,378. Males had a median income of $18,333 versus $19,375 for females. The per capita income for the city was $9,451. About 32.2% of families and 34.3% of the population were below the poverty line, including 41.6% of those under age 18 and 12.7% of those age 65 or over.

== Education ==
Public education is provided by the Wapato School District, also known as Wapato Public Schools, which operates six schools.

- Wapato High School
- Wapato Middle School
- Pace High School
- Adams Elementary
- Satus Elementary
- Camas Elementary
- Simcoe Elementary
