= Washington State Route 22 =

Highway in Washington

State Route 22
- A map of the Yakima Valley with SR 22 highlighted in red

Route information
- Maintained by WSDOT
- Length: 35.84 mi (57.68 km)
- Existed: 1964–present

Major junctions
- West end: I-82 / US 12 near Zillah
- US 97 in Toppenish
- East end: I-82 / US 12 in Prosser

Location
- Country: United States
- State: Washington
- Counties: Yakima, Benton

Highway system
- State highways in Washington; Interstate; US; State; Scenic; Pre-1964; 1964 renumbering; Former
← SR 21	→ SR 23

State Route 22 (SR 22) is a 35.84-mile (57.68 km) long state highway spanning Yakima and Benton counties in the US state of Washington. Existing since at least 1937, the highway serves to connect several small communities that have been bypassed by Interstate 82 (I-82) / U.S. Route 12 (US 12). Except for the section through Toppenish and the southeastern bypass of Prosser, the highway is lightly traveled passing mainly through rural farmland. The highway parallels a BNSF Railway line for a majority of its route, with the rail line predating the highway by at least 27 years.

Three digit highway numbers in Washington indicate auxiliary routes of their parent route, giving SR 22 five auxiliary routes: SR 220, SR 221, SR 223, SR 224, and SR 225. SR 220 was decommissioned during the 1991 legislative session, and is no longer maintained by the Washington State Department of Transportation.

== Route description ==
SR 22 begins at a hybrid diamond–partial cloverleaf interchange on the concurrent I-82 / US 12 near Buena. The route heads south through farmland towards the town of Toppenish in Yakima County, which is also part of the Yakama Indian Reservation. While in Toppenish, the highway passes over double track belonging to BNSF Railway. On the south end of town, SR 22 intersects US 97, turning southeast as US 97 heads south. Traveling southeast, SR 22 passes through more farmland, passing the small census-designated place of Satus and an interchange with SR 223. The city of Mabton is located just north of the highway, and is accessible by turning onto SR 241. The highway leaves the reservation and turns southwest after passing the Sunnyside Wildlife Recreation Area, and crosses the Yakima–Benton county line, continuing through farmland until approaching the outskirts of Prosser, the county seat of Benton County. SR 22 serves as a bypass of Prosser, turning north until intersecting Wine Country Road on the east side of Prosser before turning back southwest on Wine Country Road and terminating at a folded diamond interchange, exit 82, on I–82.

Every year the Washington State Department of Transportation (WSDOT) conducts a series of surveys on its highways in the state to measure traffic volume. This is expressed in terms of annual average daily traffic (AADT), which is a measure of traffic volume for any average day of the year. In 2009, WSDOT calculated that as few as 1,100 cars traveled through the intersection with Bus Road just west of the Sunnyside Wildlife Recreation Area, and as many as 10,000 cars passed through the town of Toppenish before the interchange with US 97.

The segment of highway between its western terminus at I-82 and US 97 is listed on both the WSDOT List of Highways of Statewide Significance, which marks this portion of the highway as a critical to connecting major communities in the state, and the National Highway System, a system of roads that are important to the nation's economy, defense and mobility.

== History ==
Shields of former PSH 8 and SSH 3A

A roadway has existed since before 1926, connecting Toppenish and Prosser near the current alignment of SR 22, however the roadway was incomplete, with a gap existing between Satus and Mabton. The gap in the roadway was completed by 1933, and the segment between Toppenish and Prosser was numbered Secondary State Highway 3A (SSH 3A) by 1939, while the segment between the current I-82 and US 97 was originally numbered as part of Primary State Highway 8 (PSH 8). These designations remained until the 1964 state highway renumbering, when SSH 3A and the small segment of PSH 8 were renumbered SR 22. Before the completion of I-82 through the area, SR 22 continued into the town of Buena, however now that the interstate has been completed, SR 22 has been truncated to the interstate.

The rail line that the highway parallels between Toppenish and just west of Prosser has existed since at least 1884. It originally belonged to the Northern Pacific Railway, and it is now part of BNSF Railway as part of their Yakima Valley Subdivision.

In Spring 2011, WSDOT began a $4.63 million construction project to build wider lanes and shoulders on SR 22 between I-82 and the city of Toppenish, because of a number of collisions along the roadway. Other improvements included installing new sidewalks with ADA-compliant curbs and access ramps, as well as adding turn lanes to side roads. The project was completed in June 2012.

== Major intersections ==
County	Location	mi	km	Destinations	Notes
Yakima		0.00– 0.17	0.00– 0.27	I-82 / US 12 – Yakima, Pendleton	I-82 exit 50; interchange, western terminus.
Yakima	Toppenish	2.97	4.78	First Street – Fort Simcoe State Park	Former SR 220
Yakima	Toppenish	3.31	5.33	US 97 – Yakima, Goldendale	At-grade intersection
Yakima		7.92	12.75	SR 223 north – Granger	
Yakima	Mabton	22.28	35.86	SR 241 north – Sunnyside	
Benton	Prosser	35.06	56.42	SR 221 south – Paterson	
Benton		35.72– 35.84	57.49– 57.68	I-82 / US 12 – Yakima, Pendleton	I-82 exit 82; interchange, eastern terminus.
1.000 mi = 1.609 km; 1.000 km = 0.621 mi
