= Washington State Route 220 =

State highway in Washington

State Route 220

- A red line indicating the path of SR 220 through Yakima County.

Route information
- Auxiliary route of SR 22
- Length: 27.42 mi (44.13 km)
- Existed: 1964–1992

Major junctions
- West end: Fort Simcoe State Park
- US 97 in Toppenish
- East end: SR 22 in Toppenish

Location
- Country: United States
- State: Washington
- Counties: Yakima

Highway system
- State highways in Washington; Interstate; US; State; Scenic; Pre-1964; 1964 renumbering; Former

State Route 220 (SR 220) was a 27.42-mile (44.13 km) long state highway located entirely in the Yakama Indian Reservation, Yakima County, Washington, United States. The highway linked Fort Simcoe State Park in the west to White Swan and Toppenish in the east. The highway had been built sometime between 1915 and 1937, and was renumbered from Secondary State Highway 3B during the 1964 state highway renumbering. The route was slated to be removed from the state highway system during the 1991 legislative session, and was removed April 1, 1992.

== Route description ==
SR 220 started at Fort Simcoe State Park, headed easterly along Fort Simcoe Road until it intersected Hawk Road. At the t intersection with Hawk Road, the highway turned north and follows Hawk Road until an intersection with White Swan Road. The highway turned back east along White Swan Road, passing through downtown White Swan, before turning south along Curtis Street. The highway passed over a BNSF Railway rail line, formerly part of the Toppenish, Simcoe & Western Railroad, before Curtis street turned easterly and became Fort Road. Fort Road continued almost perfectly east for about 18 mi (29 km) before intersecting US Route 97 (US 97). After crossing US 97, the highway continued as a city street through west Toppenish before terminating at SR 22.

Every year the Washington State Department of Transportation (WSDOT) conducts a series of surveys on its highways in the state to measure traffic volume. This is expressed in terms of annual average daily traffic (AADT), which is a measure of traffic volume for any average day of the year. In 1991, WSDOT calculated that as few as 340 cars used the highway at the western terminus and as many as 9,300 cars at the interchange with SR 22.

== History ==
The highway was first constructed some time between 1915 and 1937, with a segment linking Fort Simcoe to White Swan completed by 1937. The highway was signed as Secondary State Highway 3B (SSH 3B) between White Swan and Toppenish until the 1964 state highway renumbering when the SR 220 number was applied to the highway. The original eastern terminus was US 97, but in 1971 the terminus was extended to SR 22.

SR 220 was considered for removal in 1986 by a legislative committee with input from the state, counties, and city governments. The highway was decommissioned in 1991 along with eleven other highways, and was removed from the system effective April 1, 1992.

=== Today ===
All of the roads that SR 220 were routed along are still accessible, and have been designated major collector roads by WSDOT. The entirety of the former routing of SR 220 has been designated Classified Route S390. The city of Toppenish is eligible to receive hardship funding for the former highway between the junction with SR 22 to near Linden Road, a span of .27 mi (430 m).

== Major intersections ==
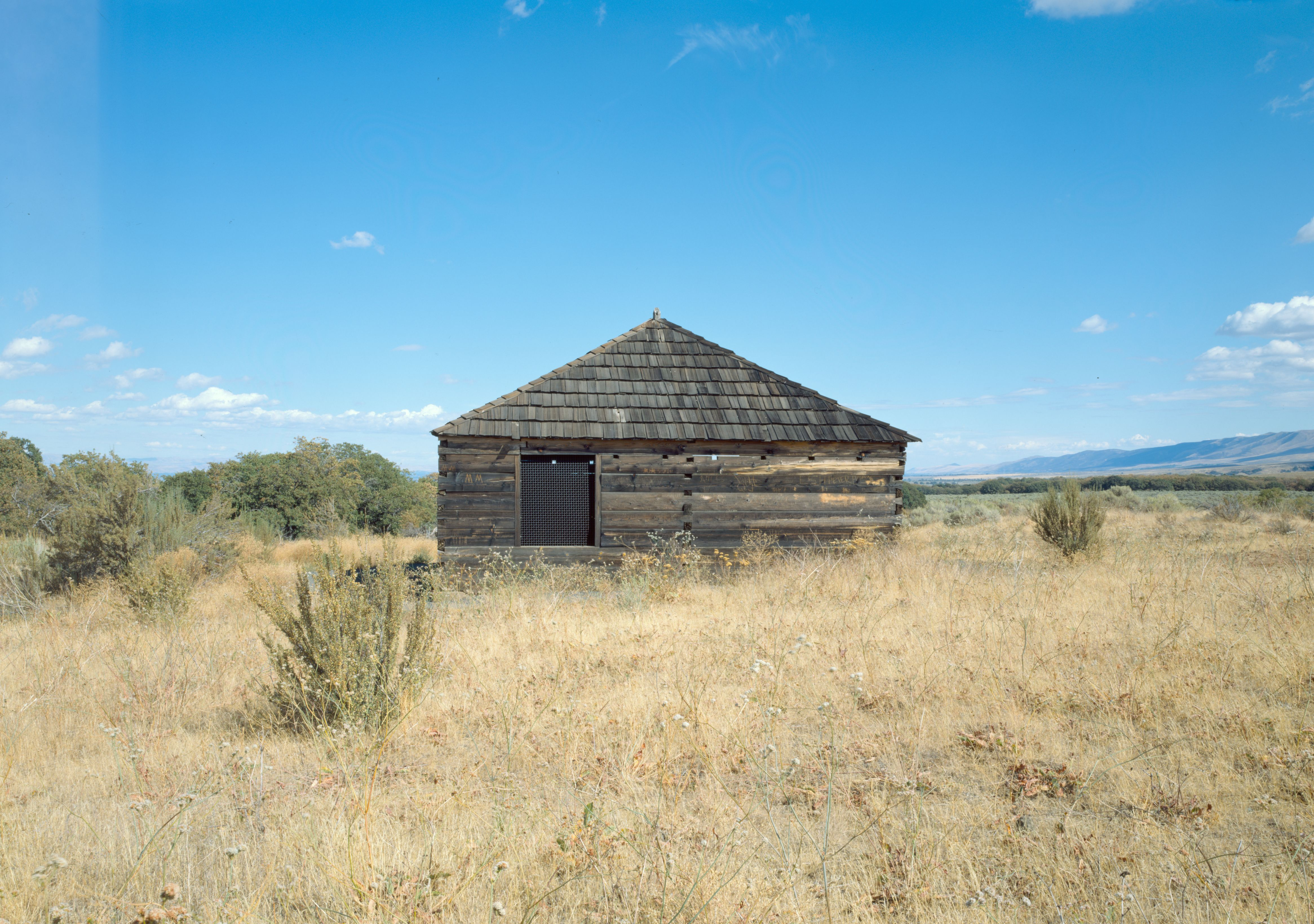
The blockhouse at Fort Simcoe

The entire highway was in Yakima County.

| Location | mi | km | Destinations | Notes |
|---|---|---|---|---|
| Fort Simcoe | 0.00 | 0.00 | Fort Simcoe State Park | At-grade intersection, western terminus |
| | 26.96 | 43.39 | US 97 – Wapato, Goldendale | |
| Toppenish | 27.42 | 44.13 | SR 22 to I-82 / US 12 – Yakima, Satus | At-grade intersection, eastern terminus |
1.000 mi = 1.609 km; 1.000 km = 0.621 mi
