= Washington State Route 223 =

State highway in Yakima County, Washington, US

State Route 223

- A red line indicating SR 223 through Yakima County

Route information
- Auxiliary route of SR 22
- Maintained by WSDOT
- Length: 3.80 mi (6.12 km)
- Existed: 1967–present

Major junctions
- West end: SR 22 near Toppenish
- East end: I-82 / US 12 in Granger

Location
- Country: United States
- State: Washington
- County: Yakima

Highway system
- State highways in Washington; Interstate; US; State; Scenic; Pre-1964; 1964 renumbering; Former
← SR 221	→ SR 224

State Route 223 (SR 223) is a 3.81-mile (6.13 km) long state highway located entirely in Yakima County, Washington, United States. It has served the role of connecting the city of Granger to the county seat, Yakima, via Interstate 82 and to SR 22 since its establishment in 1967, serving between 4,000 and 8,500 cars per day on average in 2009.

== Route description ==
SR 223 begins at an at-grade intersection with SR 22, headed easterly over a level crossing with a BNSF Railway line through rural farmland. The highway turns northeasterly as it passes over the Yakima River and passes to the east of Hisey Park. as it enters the city limits of Granger Continuing through town SR 223 crosses over another rail line before terminating at a diamond interchange with exit 58 on Interstate 82 (I-82). Except for the last 0.39 mi (0.63 km) of the highway, the speed limit is posted as 55 miles per hour (89 km/h).

Every year the Washington State Department of Transportation (WSDOT) conducts a series of surveys on its highways in the state to measure traffic volume. This is expressed in terms of annual average daily traffic (AADT), which is a measure of traffic volume for any average day of the year. In 2009, WSDOT calculated that as few as 4,300 cars traveled through the intersection at SR 22, and as many as 8,500 cars at the interchange with I-82.

== History ==
The rail line that SR 223 crosses has existed since at least 1910, originally belonging to the Spokane, Portland and Seattle Railway as part of their Yakima Valley Subdivision. A bridge over the Yakima River at Granger was completed for the railroad and later remodeled for automobile traffic in 1919; it collapsed in 1942 and was replaced by a temporary structure that was impassible for trucks and other heavy vehicles. SR 223 was completed in 1967 with the opening of a new Yakima River bridge and the Granger bypass was finished in 1969. The highway was connected to I-82 in 1981, two years after the opening of the freeway in 1979. Two additional bridges are included on SR 223, including a 243.8-metre (800 ft) long concrete continuous box beam bridge carrying the highway over the Yakima River, and an overpass over the BNSF Railway line (former Northern Pacific Railway) in Granger completed in 1969.

== Major intersections ==
The entire highway is in Yakima County.

Location	mi	km	Destinations	Notes
	0.00	0.00	SR 22 – Mabton, Toppenish	
Granger	3.73– 3.76	6.00– 6.05	I-82 / US 12 – Yakima, Sunnyside, Richland	
1.000 mi = 1.609 km; 1.000 km = 0.621 mi
