= Mount Adams School District =

School district in Washington, United States

Address
- 621 Signal Peak Road White Swan, Washington, 98952; United States

District information
- Type: Public
- Grades: PreK–12
- NCES District ID: 5305280

Students and staff
- Students: 857
- Teachers: 53.27
- Staff: 31.08
- Student–teacher ratio: 16.09

Other information
- Website: www.masd209.org

Mount Adams School District 209 (MASD) is a school district headquartered in White Swan, Washington.

In 1997 it had 1,274 students, with over 60% of them being Native American. In 2019 it had about 900 students.

Its service area includes White Swan and Harrah. It is the second largest school district in Washington State by land area.

In 2019 Janella Retka of the Yakima Herald wrote that the district has a low tax base. The portions in the Yakama Reservation do not have to pay taxes, and that reduces potential revenue going to MASD.

== Schools ==
- White Swan High School (9-12) (White Swan)
- Mount Adams Middle School (7-8) (Harrah)
- Harrah Elementary School (K-6) (Harrah)
  - The original building was built circa 1937. Attempts to have a new building dated back to circa 1979-1989. Construction of the current facility was scheduled to begin in 2019 on 70 acres (28 ha) of former farmland.
