= Mabton High School =

Mabton Junior/Senior High School

Location
- 500 East B Street; Mabton, Washington
- Coordinates: 46°12′44″N 119°59′41″W

Information
- School district: Mabton School District #120
- Principal: Esteban Florian
- Teaching staff: 21.11 (FTE)
- Grades: 7-12
- Enrollment: 374 (2023-2024)
- Student to teacher ratio: 17.72
- Color
- Mascot: Viking
- Website: www.mabton.wednet.edu/hs

Mabton Junior Senior High School is a public high school located in Mabton, Washington in Yakima County—part of Mabton School District #120. One other school is included in the district Artz-Fox Elementary.

== History ==
Mabton is a small rural farming town near the Yakima River founded in the 1800s. Mabton's population is heavily Latino due to a large influx of Mexican American agricultural workers moving to the town in the late 20th century due to the large agricultural industry in the Yakima valley and surrounding areas. Major crops grown in Mabton include apples, wine grapes, asparagus, sweet corn and cherries.

The original Mabton Jr. Sr. High School opened in 1913. The current high school was built in the 1960s, the former building being sold to the Mabton Historical Society in 1977 after being used as an elementary school.

== Demographics ==
Mabton Junior/Senior High School has an enrollment of 359 across 4 grades. The community is primarily Hispanic with the high school being 97% Hispanic and 3% White.

== Career and Technical Education ==
Mabton high school has a CTE program that provides classes in different career fields. This program includes classes related to horticulture, environmental science, STEM, metals as well as personal finance and agriculture, forestry and natural resources.

== Athletics ==
Mabton is a part of the Washington Interscholastic Activities Association in the Eastern Washington Athletic Conference (West). Under the direction of athletic director Jason Morrow. They are classified 2B in the WIAA classification system.

=== Notable Accomplishments ===
==== Track and Field ====
- 2025 State Title- Inclusive Division 1B/2B/1A

== Alumni ==
Mel Stottlemyre, Major League Baseball player
