= Secondary State Highway 8E =

There were two secondary state highways in Washington numbered 8E:

- Secondary State Highway 8E (Washington 1937-1953), now SR 221
- Secondary State Highway 8E (Washington 1961-1970), now SR 142
