= MASD =

MASD may refer to:

Pennsylvania

- Mahanoy Area School District, Schuylkill County
- McKeesport Area School District, McKeesport
- Meyersdale Area School District, Somerset County
- Mifflinburg Area School District, Union County
- Millersburg Area School District, Dauphin County
- Millville Area School District, Columbia County
- Milton Area School District, Milton
- Minersville Area School District, Schuylkill County
- Mohawk Area School District, Bessemer, Lawrence County
- Moon Area School District, located about 20 miles (32 km) northwest of Pittsburgh
- Montgomery Area School District, Lycoming County
- Montoursville Area School District, Lycoming County
- Montrose Area School District, Susquehanna County

Washington State

- Mount Adams School District, Yakima County
