= Harrah, Washington =

- Town
- Location of Harrah, Washington
- Coordinates: 46°24′22″N 120°32′27″W
- Country: United States
- State: Washington
- County: Yakima
- Incorporated: January 23, 1946

Government
  - Type: Mayor–council
  - Mayor: Barbara Harrer

Area
  - Total: 0.27 sq mi (0.71 km^{2})
  - Land: 0.27 sq mi (0.71 km^{2})
  - Water: 0 sq mi (0.00 km^{2})
- Elevation: 833 ft (254 m)

Population (2020)
  - Total: 585
  - Estimate (2021): 580
  - Density: 2,341.0/sq mi (903.85/km^{2})
- Time zone: UTC-8 (PST)
  - Summer (DST): UTC-7 (PDT)
- ZIP code: 98933
- Area code: 509
- FIPS code: 53-29710
- GNIS feature ID: 2412728

Harrah is a town in Yakima County, Washington, United States. The population was 585 at the 2020 census. It is on the Yakama Indian Reservation.

== History ==
Named after Julius Harrah, Harrah was officially incorporated on January 23, 1946. In 1950 it had a population of 297.

== Geography ==
According to the United States Census Bureau, the town has a total area of 0.22 square miles (0.57 km^{2}), all of it land.

== Demographics ==
Historical population
Census	Pop.	Note	%±
1950	297		—
1960	284		−4.4%
1970	305		7.4%
1980	343		12.5%
1990	341		−0.6%
2000	542		58.9%
2010	625		15.3%
2020	585		−6.4%
2021 (est.)	580	▼	−0.9%
U.S. Decennial Census; 2020 Census

=== 2010 census ===
As of the 2010 census, there were 625 people, 177 households, and 142 families living in the town. The population density was 2,840.9 inhabitants per square mile (1,096.9/km^{2}). There were 183 housing units at an average density of 831.8 per square mile (321.2/km^{2}). The racial makeup of the town was 24.6% White, 0.5% African American, 21.3% Native American, 0.2% Asian, 48.3% from other races, and 5.1% from two or more races. Hispanic or Latino of any race were 55.4% of the population.

There were 177 households, of which 49.7% had children under the age of 18 living with them, 57.1% were married couples living together, 12.4% had a female householder with no husband present, 10.7% had a male householder with no wife present, and 19.8% were non-families. 16.4% of all households were made up of individuals, and 6.3% had someone living alone who was 65 years of age or older. The average household size was 3.53 and the average family size was 3.89.

The median age in the town was 29.2 years. 32.5% of residents were under the age of 18; 11.7% were between the ages of 18 and 24; 27.1% were from 25 to 44; 19.8% were from 45 to 64; and 8.8% were 65 years of age or older. The gender makeup of the town was 48.3% male and 51.7% female.

=== 2000 census ===
As of the 2000 census, there were 542 people, 167 households, and 131 families living in the town. The population density was 1,887.0 people per square mile (728.6 people/km^{2}). There were 179 housing units at an average density of 623.2 per square mile (240.6/km^{2}). The racial makeup of the town was 40.59% White, 0.37% African American, 19.19% Native American, 0.37% Asian, 33.03% from other races, and 6.46% from two or more races. Hispanic or Latino of any race were 44.10% of the population.

There were 167 households, out of which 48.5% had children under the age of 18 living with them, 61.7% were married couples living together, 12.6% had a female householder with no husband present, and 21.0% were non-families. 18.6% of all households were made up of individuals, and 7.8% had someone living alone who was 65 years of age or older. The average household size was 3.25 and the average family size was 3.72.

In the town, the age distribution of the population shows 38.0% under the age of 18, 6.6% from 18 to 24, 26.4% from 25 to 44, 20.1% from 45 to 64, and 8.9% who were 65 years of age or older. The median age was 29 years. For every 100 females, there were 106.9 males. For every 100 females age 18 and over, there were 100.0 males.

The median income for a household in the town was $36,875, and the median income for a family was $41,250. Males had a median income of $31,250 versus $25,000 for females. The per capita income for the town was $12,721. About 14.5% of families and 19.8% of the population were below the poverty line, including 29.0% of those under age 18 and 16.4% of those age 65 or over.

== Education ==
Harrah is part of the Mt. Adams School District. The district operates Harrah Elementary in Harrah and Mount Adams Middle School and White Swan High School in White Swan.
