= Rafael Chaves =

American baseball player (born 1968)

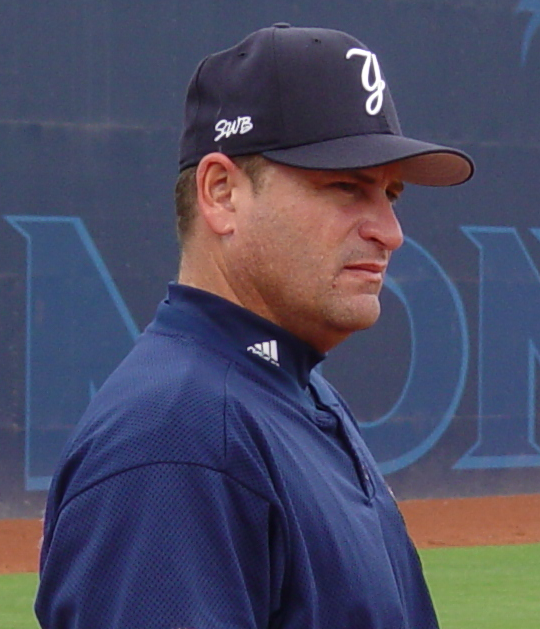
- Chaves in 2007
- Pitcher / Coach
- Born: November 1, 1968 (age 57); Houston, Texas, U.S.
- Bats: Right Throws: Right

Rafael Chaves (born January 11, 1968, in Isabela, Puerto Rico) is a Puerto Rican former professional baseball pitcher.

== Career ==
As a professional player, Chaves was signed as an undrafted free agent by the San Diego Padres in 1986. He pitched in the minor leagues until 1997, having spent time in the Baltimore Orioles, Florida Marlins, and Pittsburgh Pirates organizations.

Chaves was pitching coach of the Seattle Mariners in 2006 and 2007 and the pitching coach for the Scranton/Wilkes-Barre Yankees, the New York Yankees' Triple-A affiliate. He was the Los Angeles Dodgers' minor pitching coordinator from 2008 to 2013 and a special assistant for player personnel in 2014. On October 6, 2014, the Philadelphia Phillies announced Chaves was hired as their minor league pitching coordinator.

Chaves also served as the pitching coach for the Rochester Red Wings, the Washington Nationals’ Triple-A affiliate.

On November 9, 2025, Chaves was hired to serve as the pitching coach for the Leones de Yucatán of the Mexican League.

In 2026, he was named pitching coach for the Greensboro Grasshoppers the High-A affiliate of the Pittsburgh Pirates.

== Personal life ==
Chaves resides in Orlando, Florida with his wife, Ivelisse Abreu, daughter Nicole Chaves and grandchild Diego Puig.

Sporting positions
Preceded by Bryan Price	Seattle Mariners pitching coach 2006–2007	Succeeded by Mel Stottlemyre
