= Toppenish National Wildlife Refuge =

Protected area in Washington state, US

- IUCN category IV (habitat/species management area)
- Location within Washington (state)
- Location: Yakima County, Washington, United States
- Nearest city: Sunnyside, Washington
- Coordinates: 46.28318°N 120.11782°W
- Area: 1,978 acres (8.00 km^{2})
- Established: 1964
- Governing body: U.S. Fish and Wildlife Service
- Website: Toppenish NWR

Toppenish National Wildlife Refuge is located on the Yakama Indian Reservation about 6 miles south of Toppenish, Washington, in the agriculturally intensive Yakima Valley of eastern Washington state. Using the waters of Toppenish and Snake Creeks and supplemented with summer irrigation, managers are able to provide a mosaic of refuge wetlands interspersed with lush riparian and native upland habitats.

Wetland habitats rich with food attract thousands of wintering waterfowl, and during the summer, provide breeding grounds for an array of wetland-dependent birds, mammals, and plants. Winding its way through the refuge, Toppenish Creek serves an important role as one of the last remaining streams where Columbia River steelhead still reproduce in good numbers.

Toppenish National Wildlife Refuge is a place where people observe spectacular concentrations of waterfowl or participate in wildlife-dependent recreation such as hunting, wildlife photography or environmental education programs.
