= Washington State Route 221 =

State highway in Benton County, Washington, US

State Route 221

Route information
- Auxiliary route of SR 22
- Maintained by WSDOT
- Length: 25.95 mi (41.76 km)
- Existed: 1964–present

Major junctions
- North end: SR 22 at Prosser
- South end: SR 14 at Paterson

Location
- Country: United States
- State: Washington
- Counties: Benton

Highway system
- State highways in Washington; Interstate; US; State; Scenic; Pre-1964; 1964 renumbering; Former
← SR 215	→ SR 223

State Route 221 (SR 221) is a 25.95-mile (41.76 km) long state highway located entirely within Benton County, Washington, United States. The highway serves to connect the unincorporated community of Paterson to the county seat Prosser. The highway has existed since at least 1926 and was designated as Primary State Highway 8E from 1937 until the 1964 renumbering of Washington state highways.

== Route description ==
SR 221 starts at an intersection with SR 14 in the unincorporated community of Paterson. After leaving Paterson the highway travels north through rural farm land as a two-lane highway. A few minor roads are intersected before the roadway turns to the west after about 17 mi (27 km), before turning back to the north. After the highway resumes its northerly course it descends from the Horse Heaven Hills, with a passing lane through the uphill segments, before finally terminating at SR 22 in south Prosser.

Every year the Washington State Department of Transportation (WSDOT) conducts a series of surveys on its highways in the state to measure traffic volume. This is expressed in terms of annual average daily traffic (AADT), which is a measure of traffic volume for any average day of the year. In 2009, WSDOT calculated that as few as 2,000 cars traveled through the central part of the highway, and as many as 2,500 cars at the interchange with SR 22.

== History ==
The roadway on its current alignment has existed since at least 1926, however there are records of a road between Paterson and Prosser since 1906. The highway was designated Secondary State Highway 8E (SSH 8E) in 1937, but the route number was changed to SR 221 during the 1964 state highway renumbering.

High winds have forced the closure of SR 221 in 2003, 2004, and 2005 due to large amounts of dust being blown around, causing visibility to drop to almost zero through the Horse Heaven Hills.

== Major intersections ==
The entire highway is in Benton County.

Location	mi	km	Destinations	Notes
	0.00	0.00	SR 14 – Pendleton, Vancouver	
Prosser	25.95	41.76	SR 22 to I-82 – Mabton, Richland, Yakima	
1.000 mi = 1.609 km; 1.000 km = 0.621 mi
