= Fred Oldfield =

American painter

- Born: March 18, 1918; Alfalfa, Washington
- Died: February 24, 2017 (aged 98); Federal Way, Washington
- Resting place: Eatonville, Washington; 46.867326°N 122.266502°E
- Movement: Western art
- Spouse: Alice Daisy Oldfield (February 18, 2015 - June 4, 2001)Married March 15, 1944
- Website: www.https://fredoldfieldcenter.org/

Fred Vernon Oldfield (March 18, 1918 – February 24, 2017) was an American cowboy and western artist.

== Biography ==
Oldfield was born in Alfalfa, Washington, and grew up as a cowhand near Toppenish, Washington, on the Yakama Indian Reservation. Oldfield's parents were William Ellsworth and Sophie Marie (Westervelt) Oldfield. His siblings included Hazel, Kate, Patrick, George, Richard, William, Russell and Mary. His days as a cowboy served as inspiration in much of his western art. The family followed seasonal work in the Pacific Northwest traveling in a horse-drawn wagon. While living in Alaska in 1941, his landlady acted as his first gallery agent. She sold his 9 in × 9 in (230 mm × 230 mm) paintings on discarded linoleum depicting cowboys, Indians, and mountainous landscapes for as much as $10 each.

He married his brother Patrick's widow (Alice Daisy (Wyncoop) Oldfield on March 15, 1944. He raised Alice and Patrick's son Jerry and their daughter Patricia. In 1945 Fred and Alice had their only child, Joella Lynn. Oldfield moved his family from Toppenish, WA to Seattle, WA in 1946. There he stayed until 1959 when he moved to Ashford, WA. Nearby is Mount Rainier, which became the central subject of Oldfield’s artwork. In the 1960s, Oldfield had a few acres at the west entrance to Mount Rainier National Park. He and his wife moved to Federal Way, WA in 1976. He stayed until 2007 when he moved to Tacoma, WA, where he resided until his death in 2017. By then he had 8 grandchildren, 9 great grandchildren, and 8 great great grandchildren. Oldfield had macular degeneration late in life but continued to paint every day until his death.

== Recognition ==
Oldfield had strong ties with Toppenish and the Yakama Indian Reservation. Toppenish has some of Oldfield's very large outdoor murals. One mural spanned 108 feet in length depicts Haller's Defeat, a battle the local Natives won. The 108' mural was repainted in another location as the original building was torn down.

On March 18, 2003, the City of Puyallup, the City of Federal Way, and Pierce County celebrated Oldfield's 85th birthday and proclaimed it "Fred Oldfield Day". It was simultaneously proclaimed "Fred Oldfield Day" by Gary Locke, Governor of the state of Washington.

In 2008 on his 90th birthday he was once again recognized in the Senate for his work and contributions to the community. Oldfield donated hundreds of paintings generating hundreds of thousands of dollars which benefited numerous causes throughout the Pacific Northwest.

A public television series Painting the West with Fred Oldfield was created in April 2007. At least one cowboy song and six books have been written about Fred Oldfield and his art. One such book is Fred Oldfield: The Man and His Art (Cheney, WA: Art of the Northwest, 1981) authored by Jay Moynahan of Spokane. One month before Oldfield's death he was featured on KOMO TV in a segment of Eric's Heroes.

The Fred Oldfield Western Heritage and Art Center was Founded in 2002. The Center commemorates and preserves Oldfield's contribution to Western art. The Oldfield Center is located on the Washington State Fairgrounds, in Puyallup. The Center provides an art school for students of all ages.
