= Rachel Ruelas =

American politician

Mayor of Mabton, Washington
- In office January 2022 – January 2026
- Preceded by: Laura Vazquez
- Succeeded by: Martha Gonzalez

Rachel Ruelas is an American politician and member of the Democratic Party who was elected mayor of Mabton, Washington in November 2021 as a write-in candidate. In 2024, two separate recall campaigns were filed, one by members of the city council and one by citizens, over allegations of gross incompetence.

== Political career ==
Ruelas first entered politics in 2017 when she and her son each ran for a seat on the Mabton city council. She lost in the general election to incumbent Sophia Gutierrez-Sotelo, 37% to 63%.

After the 2021 primary election, Ruelas coordinated a write-in campaign for mayor of Mabtom with two other individuals running for city council positions. She posted regularly on Facebook concerning the Mabton staffing and direction. The three candidates won their elections, with Ruelas defeating incumbent mayor Laura Vazquez 109 votes to 58 votes. When Ruelas took office, the city of Mabton faced years of poor water quality along with the city government plagued with financial and budgetary problems.

In a June 2024 council meeting, councilmembers and the public expressed frustration with Ruelas's failure to release a city budget and council minutes, as well as a failure to oversee city personnel, including the deputy clerk who was arrested for allegedly stealing $22,000 from the city. The council called on Ruelas to resign and she refused, stating "We are not talking about anything that is going on in the community." Ruelas then ended the meeting early and refused to take questions from reporters. The following day, the city council voted 4–1 to initiate a recall campaign against Ruelas over gross incompetence and unethical use of city resources to promote her business. The sole no vote was from councilmember Diana Casteneda, Ruelas' mother, who told the council and audience, "I am disappointed in some of you people that are here for this meeting."

A separate recall petition was submitted by Mabton resident Ruben Olivarez in August 2024, with two charges, convincing the previous city council to approve a $8,000 a year pay increase for her and not releasing a city budget. A Yakima Superior Court ruled, in separate cases, that two charges from each petition could move forward: the lack of notice over the budget process and use of the city website to promote her bridal businesses from the first petition, and both charges from the second petition. In both cases, Ruelas appealed the rulings to the Washington Supreme Court.

Ruelas did provide a preliminary budget to the council in October 2024, nearly a month past the deadline she gave the court, and city council members and staff struggled to create a budget due to incomplete and inaccurate city financial reports.

In October 2024, a fight broke out at the Mi Casa 2 restaurant between two groups: Ruela, her husband, and son on one side and Ruben Olivarez and his wife on the other. Olivarez's family criticized the police response to the incident, saying the police did not call them after the incident and only talked to Ruelas after she called the officers. An officer met Olivarez the following day and took an incident report; he and Reulas filed protective orders against the other. In the Yakima Superior Court case addressing both the protective orders, the judge denied Oliverez's order because " [he] was the aggressor because he escalated by demanding to know, 'Who are you looking at?'" The judge granted Ruelas' protective order, but allowed Oliverez to attend city council meetings.

Since the recall efforts began, Ruelas has not given a statement to or answered questions from any media outlet regarding the budget or other city issues. In the October protective order case, Ruelas complained about her coverage in the media, saying "(Olivarez has) been on the news and he’s referred to me several times with the news media that you have here today, so I feel that Apple Valley News has always attacked me in the news media..." The judge in the case responded in part to Ruelas "...you need to toughen up a little bit and recognize that if you’re going to be in public office, you’re going to deal with people who are being passionate and so on."

In 2025, Ruelas lost her reelection bid in a landslide, with 16% of the vote to payroll specialist Martha Gonzalez, who earned 84%.

== Personal life ==
Ruelas is married, and she has six children. Before running for city council, Ruelas owned L.A. Style, a wedding and quinceañera dress store in Toppenish, Washington, which is now closed. She now owns Forever Bridal and Decorating in Prosser, Washington.
