= Fort Simcoe =

Historic site in Washington, United States

Fort Simcoe Historical State Park
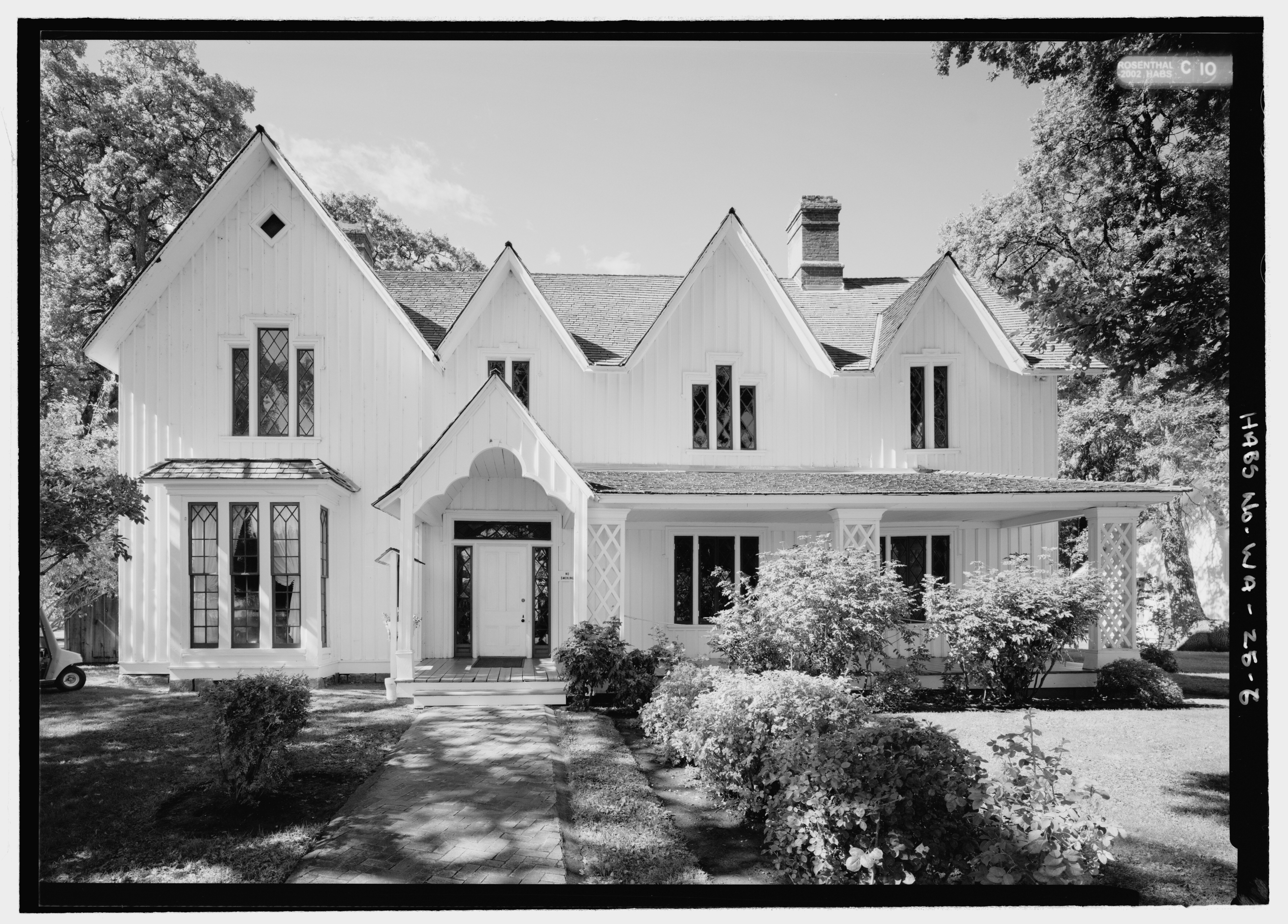
- Commandant's House

- Location within Washington (state) Location within the United States
- Location: Yakima County, Washington, United States
- Coordinates: 46°20′34″N 120°50′13″W
- Area: 200 acres (81 ha)
- Elevation: 1,401 ft (427 m)
- Established: 1856-1859 fort; 1953 park
- Administrator: Washington State Parks and Recreation Commission
- Website: Official website
- Fort Simcoe State Park
- U.S. National Register of Historic Places
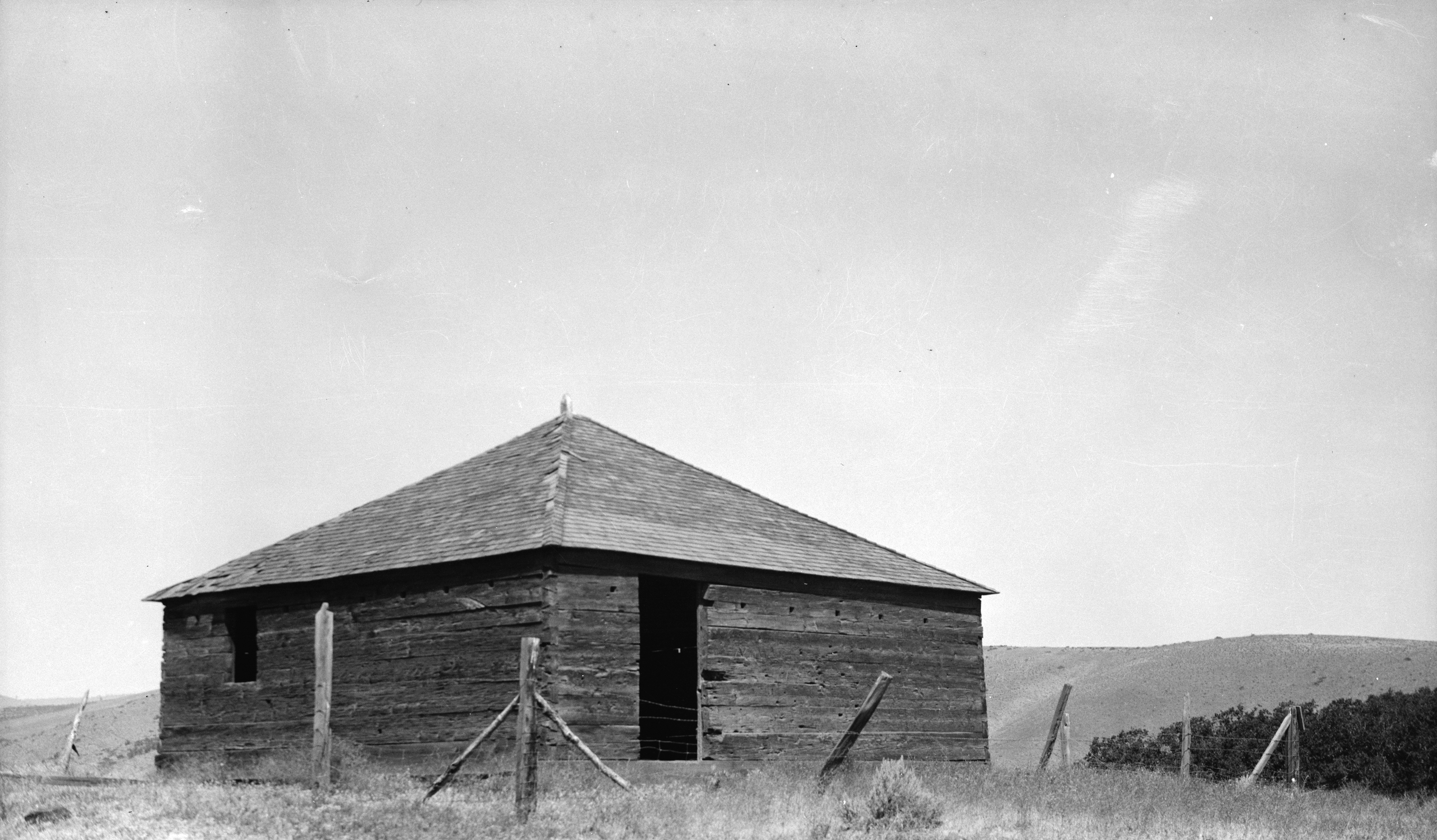
- Fort Simcoe blockhouse, ca. 1930s (HABS archives)
- Location: Yakima County, SW of Yakima on SR-220
- Nearest city: Yakima, Washington
- Built: 1856
- Architect: Robert Seldon Garnett; Louis Scholl
- Architectural style: Gothic Revival
- NRHP reference No.: 74001994
- Added to NRHP: June 27, 1974

Fort Simcoe was a United States Army fort erected in south-central Washington Territory to house troops sent to keep watch over local Indian tribes. The site and remaining buildings are preserved as Fort Simcoe Historical State Park, located eight miles (13 km) west of modern White Swan, Washington, in the foothills of the Cascade Mountains and near the base of the Simcoe Mountains.

== History ==
The site was a school for tribes of Indigenous peoples of the Americas from areas all around the present state of Washington. Prior to 1850, the site was used as a school where Native American children taken from their families were forced to cease practicing traditional customs and speak English, a specific practice in ethnocide. Punishment for non-compliant children included imprisonment in a small jail.

The fort was built in the late 1850s in an old oak grove watered by natural springs by future Civil War general Robert S. Garnett. The fort was in use for three years. The park was established in 1953.

The fort was built along the route used by the Yakama people to travel between the Yakima Valley and traditional fishing areas along the Columbia River. This location allowed soldiers of the new commander to keep an eye out for visitors to the tribe and basically keep an eye on the tribe. Fort Simcoe is often viewed as part of a larger program of cultural genocide during this period, due to the Federal practice of tribal merging and enforced assimilation to American culture. The tribes were to learn famous Americans and given Christian/American names.

In 1922, the U.S. government decided to move the Indian agency from Fort Simcoe to Toppenish which triggered extreme emotions. Moving the Indian Agency recalled the act of relocations for generations of the original tribes. The location of the fort also provided trading routes established by waterway or railroad. Architect Louis Scholl designed and constructed the fort. Fort Simcoe is similar to the design of Fort Dalles where there are blockhouses at each corners but no stockade allowing barracks to define the fortification. James Harvey Wilbur and Captain Frederick Dent took on the challenge of creating a road passage to Fort Simcoe, and said about their goals that "the fort's location also fits perfectly with the army strategic goal to carve out a road system that connected California with Washington Territory".

== Park and museum ==
Fort Simcoe Historical State Park is a 200-acre (0.81 km^{2}), day-use heritage park on the Yakama Indian Reservation. The park is primarily an interpretive effort, telling the story of mid-19th-century army life and providing images of the lives of local Native Americans. Five original buildings are still standing at the fort: the commander's house, three captain's houses, and a blockhouse. Various other buildings have been recreated to appear original. Houses are filled with period furnishings. The park was placed on the National Register of Historic Places in 1974.

The interpretive center, the original commander's house and two officers' buildings with period furnishings are open to the public from April through September on Wednesday through Sunday. The original blockhouse and other recreated fort buildings are not open to the public. Special re-enactments and living history events are held during the year, as well as other special events.
