= KDNA =

- Yakima, Washington; United States
- Broadcast area: Yakima, Washington
- Frequency: 91.9 MHz

Programming
- Format: Spanish Variety

Ownership
- Owner: Northwest Communities Education Center

History
- First air date: December 19, 1979

Technical information
- Licensing authority: FCC
- Facility ID: 49729
- Class: C1
- ERP: 18,500 watts
- HAAT: 280 meters
- Transmitter coordinates: 46°31′42″N 120°31′3″W

Links
- Public license information: Public file; LMS
- Website: www.kdna.org

KDNA (91.9 FM) is a radio station broadcasting a Spanish Variety format including music (norteña, accordion, banda, and mariachi), children's programming, local and international news and a unique show each weekday morning highlighting employment opportunities in the Yakima area, all in Spanish. Licensed to Yakima, Washington, United States, the station serves the Yakima area. The station is currently owned by Northwest Communities Education Center, and has a studio in Granger, Washington.

== History of Spanish-language radio ==
Latinos yearned for media representation and they sought out a radio license from the Federal Government in the early 1920s, however many popular show times were given to American/English radio stations. Most Latino/Spanish radio stations had to opt for purchasing less desirable show time hours such as early in the morning or very late into the evening. Many of the people working towards creating a better and stronger Spanish radio station did so because they wanted to rebuild a patriotic citizenry, that promoted literacy and sobriety that focused more on the folkloric and nationalist elements, for Mexicans not only in the United States but also in Mexico. Pedro J. Gonzalez along with his group Los Madrugadores (The Early Risers) were listened to by many agricultural workers, their music was an inspiration to many however they were also a direct opposing force towards the U.S. government and their efforts to deport Mexicans during the Great Depression. Pedro and his group helped pioneer the road for media representation of Latinos and they were a building block that allowed Spanish-language radio broker Raoul Cortez to be granted, in 1946, the first U.S. radio station to be licensed to a Latino.

== History ==
Radio KDNA is the nation's first full-time Spanish-language non-commercial radio station, and the first Spanish-language public radio station in Washington state. Known as "la voz del campesino" (the voice of the farm worker) Radio KDNA is the first radio station in Eastern Washington to produce programming to the Spanish-speaking population of Eastern Washington.

KDNA was founded on December 19, 1979, by Ricardo García, Julio Cesar Guerrero, Rosa Ramon and Daniel Robleski in Granger, Washington. García met Robleski in Bellingham, Washington, and decided to unite Robleski and Guerrero and create the first radio station to broadcast all in Spanish in Washington State. They wanted to find a way to unite farm workers from different communities. Conversations about an all-Spanish radio broadcast for farmworkers started as early as 1974 when directors of social programs in Idaho, Oregon, and Washington meet but nothing concrete was done until García met Guerrero and Robleski.

During the first stages of KDNA, it was just a small entertainment program in Lynden, Washington, which was directed by Guerrero and Robleski. Some time later, they met Radio KRAB in Seattle and began to transmit their program through Radio KRAB's frequency, but this frequency was only received by receivers built for the special frequency. After this step, García, Guerrero, and Robleski agreed to rent 20 radios for this frequency in order to create a company but this plan failed as there was no money to continue with this plan.

This small program also prompted the creation of a news program that was also produced by Guerrero and Robleski and Estela del Villar, the first announcer of the program, broadcast popular music continuously for 12 hours a day, seven days a week. With the help of Ernie Nash, a retired lawyer for the Federal Communications Commission (FCC) helped the small program acquire a license with the FCC to be established in Yakima Valley in Washington State. When this was accomplished, Rosa Ramón was hired with Guerrero and Robleski still producing. Ramón then became the only female co-founder of KDNA (she served as station manager from 1979 to 1984).

After all this, a search for an acronym was done and KDNA was formed. When pronounced, KDNA sounded like "cadena" (the word for "chain" in Spanish, it was labeled Radio Cadena. Along with a new acronym, KDNA, the small program also received a new slogan: "Radio Cadena, La Voz de Campesino" ("Radio Cadena, the Voice of the Farmworker"). Hence, on December 19, 1979, the first transmission was made and thus the station that we know as Radio KDNA was founded. Radio Cadena's "mission was to motivate, animate, mobilize, organize the community towards the road of progress,... promoting... respect for [the] elderly, the value of education and the civic participation of everyone. The best variety of music [was] listened to in Radio KDNA."

== Social justice activism ==
César Chávez visited KDNA-FM, a public Spanish-language radio station located in the state of Washington's Yakima Valley, an area known mostly for its apple harvest. Impressed by the radio station's operation and control by local farmworkers, he invited the producer who trained the employees and formatted the majority of their shows— Julio Guerrero— to start one on behalf of the UFW. Particularly wowed by KDNA's immigrant-based shows, Chávez marveled at the station's commitment to a decidedly rural and farmworker listenership. According to KDNA station manager Ricardo García, Chávez not only publicly applauded the small Yakima station but his visit inspired the UFW to craft their own community-based radio stations along California's agricultural heartlands. Rosa Ramon, one of the founders and also the station's first manager wanted Radio KDNA wanted serve other ethnic populations in the Yakima area. An advisory board of representatives from the different ethnic groups was formed.

== Response to INS raids ==
The people that work at Radio KDNA were involved with warnings about Immigration and Naturalization Service (INS) raids in the community. When they learned that INS would be in the Yakima Valley, the staff created a subtle yet extremely effective way of alerting the farm workers and their families about the incoming raids. The staff, to warn the workers, would play a song about La migra, focused primarily in the area that was said to be soon raided. The town's folk understood the hidden message and did what they could to avoid INS. Yakima valley had become home to a massive community of migrant farm worker, fourth in the US, with some 60,000 Spanish speakers that made up about 30 percent of the population, specifically during harvest season.

== Former usage ==
KDNA was the call-letters of a listener-supported, early community radio station in St. Louis, Missouri at 102.5 MHz from 1968 to 1973. That frequency in that locale is now occupied by CBS-owned KEZK, while the programming descendant of the earlier KDNA was KDHX at 88.1 MHz.

== See also ==
- Spanish-language radio stations in the United States by state
- List of community radio stations in the United States
