= Mel Stottlemyre =

American baseball player and coach (1941–2019)

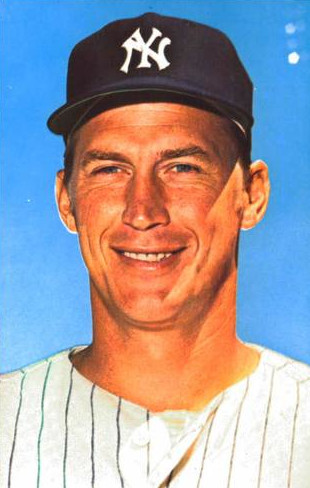
- Stottlemyre in a 1970 baseball card
- Pitcher
- Born: November 13, 1941; Hazleton, Missouri, U.S.
- Died: January 13, 2019 (aged 77); Seattle, Washington, U.S.
- Batted: Right Threw: Right

MLB debut
- August 12, 1964, for the New York Yankees

Last MLB appearance
- August 16, 1974, for the New York Yankees

MLB statistics
- Win–loss record: 164–139
- Earned run average: 2.97
- Strikeouts: 1,257
- Stats at Baseball Reference

Teams
- As player: New York Yankees (1964–1974); As coach: New York Mets (1984–1993); Houston Astros (1994–1995); New York Yankees (1996–2005); Seattle Mariners (2008)

Career highlights and awards
- 5× All-Star (1965, 1966, 1968–1970); 5× World Series champion (1986, 1996, 1998–2000); Monument Park honoree

Melvin Leon Stottlemyre Sr. (November 13, 1941 – January 13, 2019) was an American professional baseball pitcher and pitching coach. He played for 11 seasons in Major League Baseball, all for the New York Yankees, and coached for 23 seasons, for the Yankees, New York Mets, Houston Astros, and Seattle Mariners. He was a five-time MLB All-Star as a player and a five-time World Series champion as a coach.

== Baseball career ==
=== As a player (1964–1974) ===
Stottlemyre pitched in American Legion Baseball and attended Mabton High School in Mabton, Washington, and Yakima Valley Community College. A scout for the New York Yankees discovered Stottlemyre pitching for Yakima's baseball team, and signed him to a contract with no signing bonus on June 10, 1961. The Yankees assigned him to the Harlan Smokies of the Rookie-level Appalachian League. After appearing in eight games, the Yankees promoted him to the Auburn Yankees of the Class D New York–Penn League, and he appeared in seven games for Auburn.

Stottlemyre pitched to a 17–9 win–loss record and a 2.50 earned run average (ERA) with the Greensboro Yankees of the Class B Carolina League in 1962, and was promoted to the Richmond Virginians of the Class AAA International League in 1963. He alternated between starting and relieving for Richmond, before Ralph Houk, the Yankees' general manager, insisted that Stottlemyre be used exclusively as a starting pitcher. He recorded a 1.42 ERA in the 1964 season, the best in the International League.

Called up midseason in 1964, Stottlemyre went 9–3 to help the Yankees to their fifth consecutive pennant while being on the cover of The Sporting News. In the 1964 World Series, Stottlemyre faced Bob Gibson of the St. Louis Cardinals three times in the seven-game Series. Stottlemyre bested Gibson in Game 2 to even the series, and got a no-decision in Game 5, but lost the decisive Game 7 as the Cardinals won the Series.

Stottlemyre was named to the American League's (AL) roster for the 1965 Major League Baseball (MLB) All-Star Game, though he did not appear in the game. He won 20 games in the 1965 season, and led the AL with 18 complete games, 291 innings pitched, and 1,188 batters faced. He appeared in the 1966 MLB All-Star Game. He led the league with 20 losses. Stottlemyre won 20 games in the 1968 and 1969 seasons. He also started the 1969 MLB All-Star Game. Unfortunately, he pitched for the Yankees at the tail-end of their success. The next time the team was close to the AL Pennant was when they finished two games short of the AL East title in his final season in 1974.

Stottlemyre threw 40 shutouts in his 11-season career, the same number as Hall of Fame lefty Sandy Koufax, which ties for 44th best all-time. Eighteen of those shutouts came in a three-season span from 1971–73. The Yankees released Stottlemyre before the 1975 season. Stottlemyre retired with 164 career wins and a 2.97 ERA.

Known as a solid-hitting pitcher, on July 20, 1965, Stottlemyre hit a rare inside-the-park grand slam. On September 26, 1964, he recorded five base hits in five at bats.

=== Coaching years (1984–2008) ===
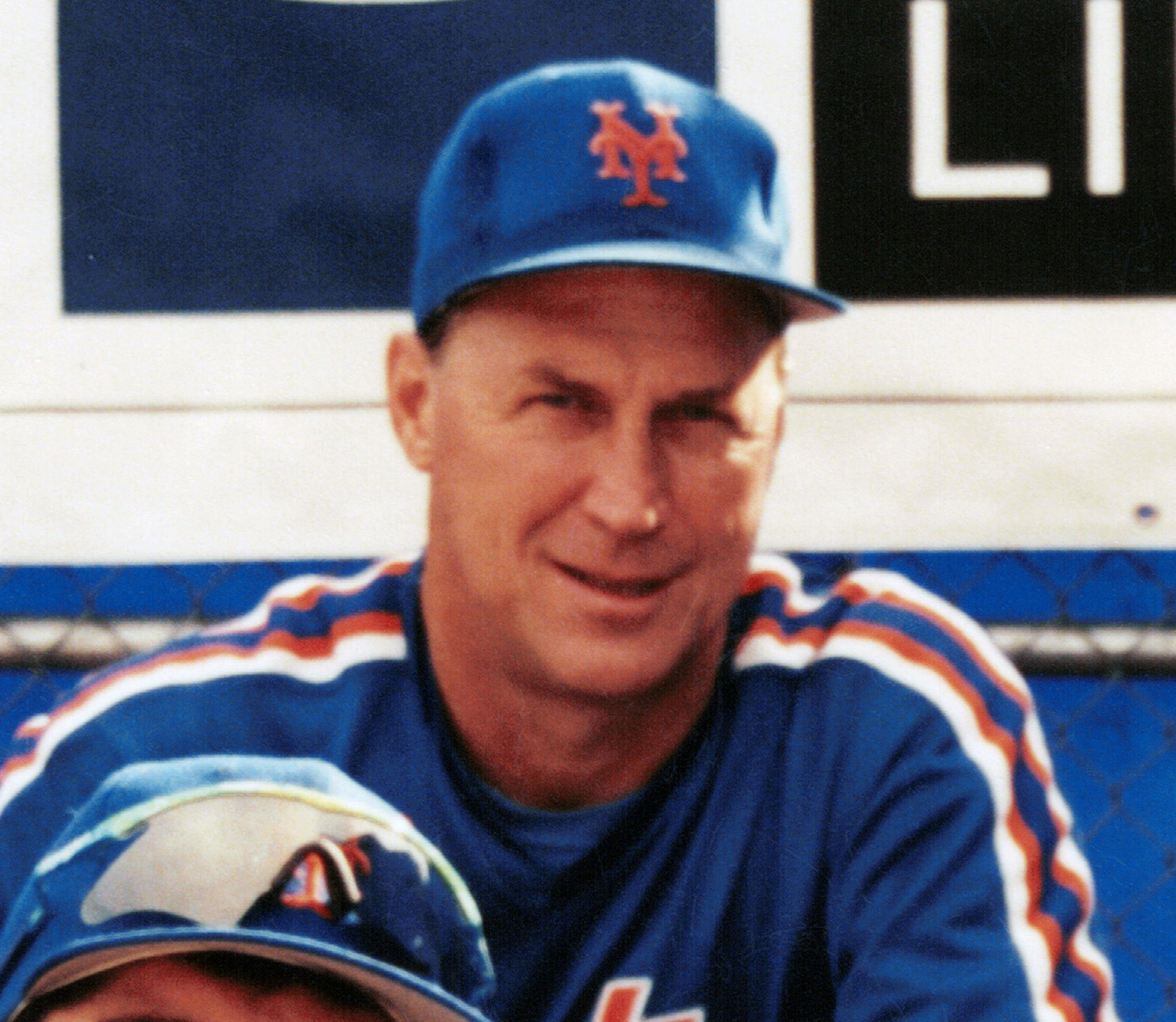
Stottlemyre as the Mets' pitching coach in 1992

In 1977, Stottlemyre re-emerged in baseball as a roving instructor for the Seattle Mariners. He spent five seasons in that position, and was hired by the New York Mets as their pitching coach in November 1983. In that role, he oversaw Dwight Gooden's National League Rookie of the Year and Cy Young Award seasons in 1984 and 1985. Stottlemyre served in the role for ten years (including the 1986 World Series championship team) and then followed that by serving a two-year stint as the Houston Astros pitching coach.

==== New York Yankees (1996–2005) ====
In 1996, Stottlemyre joined the Yankees coaching staff along with the incoming manager Joe Torre. Under Torre, Stottlemyre lowered the team ERA from 4.65 in 1996 to 3.84 in 1997. Under Stottlemyre, the Yankee team averaged an ERA of 4.23 from 1996 to 2005. The pitching staff was regarded as a major factor in the team's dynasty years, when they won four World Series Championships in five years.

After 10 seasons, Stottlemyre resigned his coaching position on October 12, 2005, following the Yankees' defeat in the 2005 American League Division Series by the Los Angeles Angels of Anaheim. He cited personal disagreements with Yankees owner George Steinbrenner among his reasons for leaving and cited Steinbrenner's comment that, after the division series was over, he had congratulated Angels manager Mike Scioscia. Stottlemyre's response was: "My first thought was, 'What about Joe?' Joe did a hell of a job, too. To congratulate the other manager and not congratulate your own, after what he's done this year, I laughed." The Yankees replaced Stottlemyre with former Yankees pitcher Ron Guidry.

==== Seattle Mariners (2008) ====
Stottlemyre was named pitching coach of the Seattle Mariners under manager John McLaren at the beginning of the 2008 season, and was retained by interim manager Jim Riggleman after McLaren's firing. He was dismissed after the season ended. Following the season, he retired from baseball.

== Honors ==
The mayor of Mabton, Washington, declared October 12, 1964, to be "Mel Stottlemyre Day". He was inducted into the Washington State American Legion Baseball Hall of Fame in 2012. At Old-Timers' Day on June 20, 2015, the Yankees dedicated a plaque in Monument Park in Stottlemyre's honor.

== Personal life ==
Stottlemyre was raised in the town of Mabton, Washington, located in the south-central part of the state. He resided with his wife, Jean, in Issaquah, Washington. His first two sons, Mel Jr. and Todd, followed their father by becoming major-league pitchers; youngest son Jason died of leukemia at age 11 in 1981.

Stottlemyre and John Harper coauthored an autobiography titled Pride and Pinstripes, published in 2007.

Stottlemyre was diagnosed with multiple myeloma in 2000. In remission for several years, he was an avid supporter of the Multiple Myeloma Research Foundation. The cancer reappeared in 2011. Stottlemyre died on January 13, 2019, at the age of 77, of cancer. To honor Stottlemyre, the Yankees wore black armbands on their uniform during the 2019 season.

== See also ==
- List of second-generation Major League Baseball players
- List of Major League Baseball players who spent their entire career with one franchise

Sporting positions
Preceded by Bill Monbouquette	New York Mets pitching coach 1984–1993	Succeeded by Greg Pavlick
Preceded by Bob Cluck	Houston Astros pitching coach 1994–1995	Succeeded by Brent Strom
Preceded by Nardi Contreras	New York Yankees pitching coach 1996–2005	Succeeded by Ron Guidry
Preceded by Rafael Chaves	Seattle Mariners pitching coach 2008	Succeeded by Rick Adair
