= Satus, Washington =

- CDP
- Location of Satus, Washington
- Coordinates: 46°14′06″N 120°07′15″W
- Country: United States
- State: Washington
- County: Yakima

Area
  - Total: 69.3 sq mi (179 km^{2})
  - Land: 68.6 sq mi (178 km^{2})
  - Water: 0.7 sq mi (1.8 km^{2})
- Elevation: 705 ft (215 m)

Population (2000)
  - Total: 746
  - Density: 11/sq mi (4.2/km^{2})
- Time zone: UTC-8 (Pacific (PST))
  - Summer (DST): UTC-7 (PDT)
- FIPS code: 53-61385
- GNIS feature ID: 2409288

Satus is a census-designated place (CDP) in Yakima County, Washington, United States, located on the eastern corner of the Yakama Indian Reservation. The population was 746 at the 2000 census. It is southwest from the Toppenish National Wildlife Refuge. The community was not recognized in the 2010 census. The area was first settled and established as a post office location in 1890.

== Geography ==
The location of the incorporated area of Satus within the Yakama Indian Reservation

According to the United States Census Bureau, the CDP has a total area of 69.3 square miles (179 km^{2}), of which, 68.6 square miles (178 km^{2}) is land and 0.7 square miles (1.8 km^{2}) (0.98%) is water.

== Demographics ==
As of the 2000 United States census, there were 746 people, 200 households, and 168 families in the CDP. The population density was 10.9 people per square mile (4.2 people/km^{2}). There were 215 housing units at an average density of 3.1 per square mile (1.2/km^{2}). The racial makeup of the CDP was 32.98% White, 0.27% African American, 37.00% Native American, 0.27% Asian, 0.13% Pacific Islander, 23.73% from other races, and 5.63% from two or more races. Hispanic or Latino of any race were 27.48% of the population.

There were 200 households, out of which 41.5% had children under the age of 18 living with them, 61.0% were married couples living together, 10.5% had a female householder with no husband present, and 16.0% were non-families. 12.5% of all households were made up of individuals, and 6.5% had someone living alone who was 65 years of age or older. The average household size was 3.52 and the average family size was 3.79.

The population contained 34.7% under the age of 18, 10.2% from 18 to 24, 25.7% from 25 to 44, 22.0% from 45 to 64, and 7.4% who were 65 years of age or older. The median age was 29 years. For every 100 females, there were 120.7 males. For every 100 females age 18 and over, there were 121.4 males.

The median income for a household in the CDP was $32,143, and the median income for a family was $29,167. Males had a median income of $28,958 versus $28,523 for females. The per capita income for the CDP was $9,905. About 23.1% of families and 27.1% of the population were below the poverty line, including 37.0% of those under age 18 and 16.7% of those age 65 or over.
