= Paterson, Washington =

Unincorporated community in Washington, United States

Paterson
- Unincorporated community
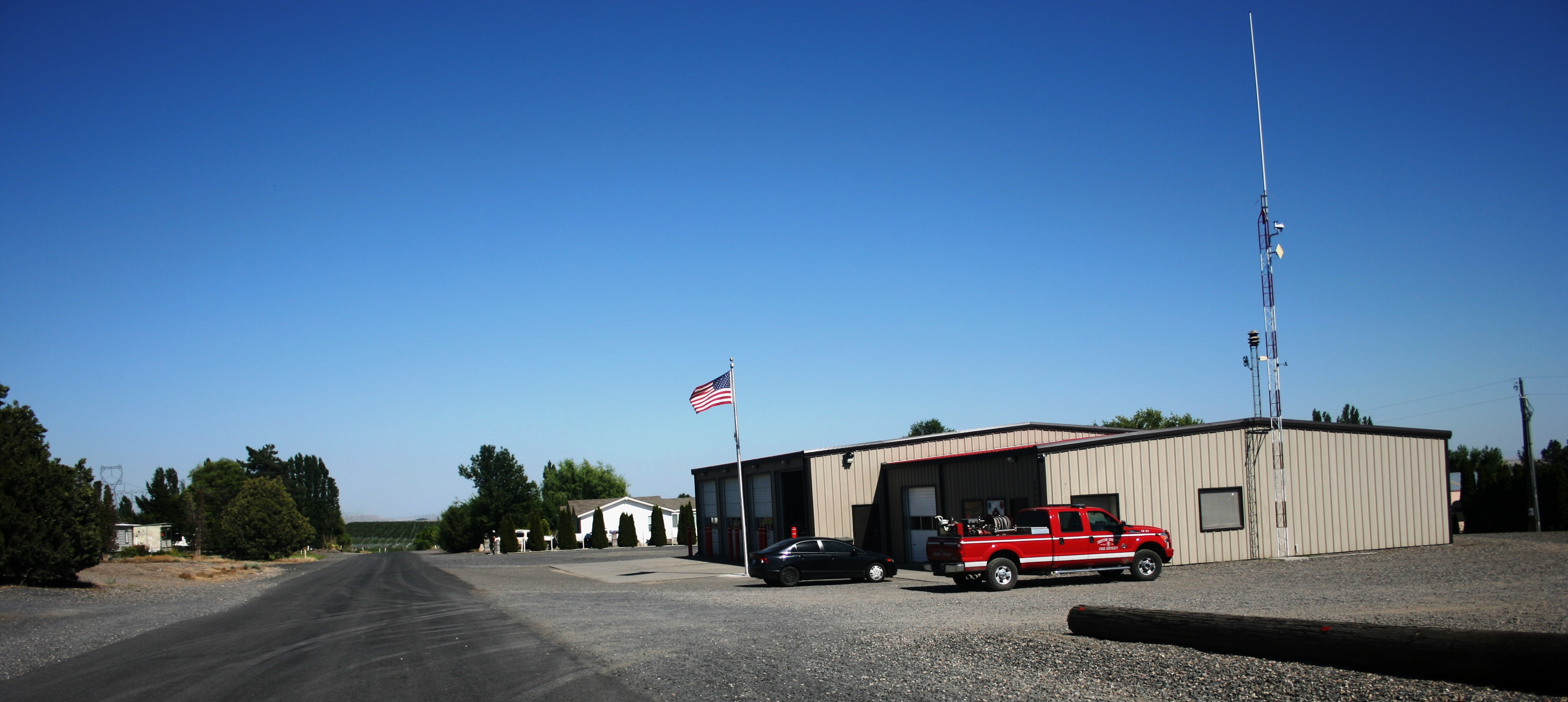

- Location within the state of Washington
- Coordinates: 45°56′13″N 119°36′10″W
- Country: United States
- State: Washington
- County: Benton
- Elevation: 384 ft (117 m)
- Time zone: UTC-8 (Pacific (PST))
  - Summer (DST): UTC-7 (PDT)
- ZIP code: 99345
- Area code: 509
- GNIS feature ID: 1511216

Paterson is an unincorporated community in Benton County, Washington, United States, located on the northern banks of the Columbia River at the junction of Washington State Route 14 and Washington State Route 221. It was named for early settler Henry Paterson.

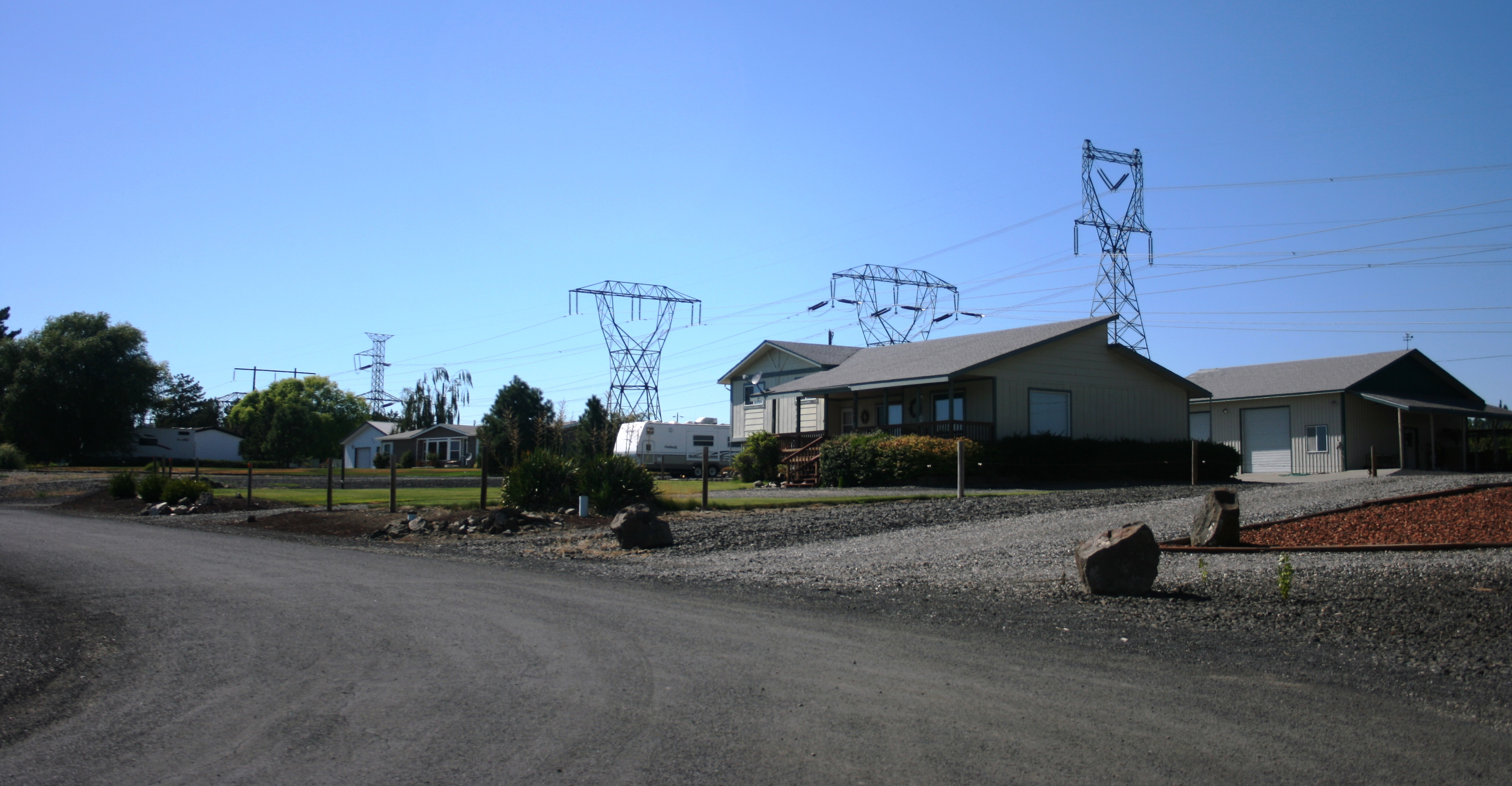
Paterson residential area as seen in July 2013.

== Climate ==
According to the Köppen Climate Classification system, Paterson has a semi-arid climate, abbreviated "BSk" on climate maps.
