= Granger, Washington =

- City
- Main Street
- Motto: Where Dinosaurs Roam
- Location of Granger in Washington
- Coordinates: 46°20′44″N 120°11′33″W
- Country: United States
- State: Washington
- County: Yakima

Government
  - Type: Mayor–council
  - Mayor: Hilda González

Area
  - Total: 1.74 sq mi (4.51 km^{2})
  - Land: 1.73 sq mi (4.48 km^{2})
  - Water: 0.015 sq mi (0.04 km^{2})
- Elevation: 735 ft (224 m)

Population (2020)
  - Total: 3,624
  - Estimate (2021): 3,668
  - Density: 2,216.6/sq mi (855.85/km^{2})
- Time zone: UTC-8 (PST)
  - Summer (DST): UTC-7 (PDT)
- ZIP code: 98932
- Area code: 509
- FIPS code: 53-27960
- GNIS feature ID: 2410640
- Website: grangerwashington.org

Granger is a city in Yakima County, Washington, United States. The population was 3,624 at the 2020 census. Although it was classified as a town in 2000, it has since been reclassified as a city.

== History ==
Granger was founded in 1902 and named after Walter Granger, superintendent of the Washington Irrigation Company who also laid out the cities of Zillah and Sunnyside. Granger was officially incorporated on September 28, 1909. In the 1910s and 1920s, the town had several large industries including a tile and brick company and a cider mill.

The Granger Farm Workers Camp, which opened in May 1941 two miles north of the city, became known as the Crewport, Washington Farm Labor Camp. It was built by the Farm Security Administration to house Dust Bowl refugees, initially White, and later Mexican Americans, who were brought in to work in the Yakima Valley as a result of World War II labor shortages. The camp closed in the late 1960s.

== Geography ==
According to the United States Census Bureau, the city has a total area of 1.80 square miles (4.66 km^{2}), of which, 1.79 square miles (4.64 km^{2}) is land and 0.01 square miles (0.03 km^{2}) is water.

== Demographics ==
Historical population
Census	Pop.	Note	%±
1910	453		—
1920	412		−9.1%
1930	568		37.9%
1940	752		32.4%
1950	1,164		54.8%
1960	1,424		22.3%
1970	1,567		10.0%
1980	1,812		15.6%
1990	2,053		13.3%
2000	2,530		23.2%
2010	3,246		28.3%
2020	3,624		11.6%
2021 (est.)	3,668		1.2%
U.S. Decennial Census; 2020 Census

=== 2020 census ===
As of the 2020 census, Granger had a population of 3,624. The median age was 25.9 years. 36.3% of residents were under the age of 18 and 6.6% of residents were 65 years of age or older. For every 100 females there were 101.4 males, and for every 100 females age 18 and over there were 104.2 males age 18 and over.

There were 894 households in Granger, of which 67.2% had children under the age of 18 living in them. Of all households, 53.1% were married-couple households, 12.2% were households with a male householder and no spouse or partner present, and 21.4% were households with a female householder and no spouse or partner present. About 7.6% of all households were made up of individuals and 3.8% had someone living alone who was 65 years of age or older.

There were 946 housing units, of which 5.5% were vacant. The homeowner vacancy rate was 0.6% and the rental vacancy rate was 4.5%.

0.0% of residents lived in urban areas, while 100.0% lived in rural areas.

Racial composition as of the 2020 census
Race	Number	Percent
White	698	19.3%
Black or African American	8	0.2%
American Indian and Alaska Native	132	3.6%
Asian	7	0.2%
Native Hawaiian and Other Pacific Islander	2	0.1%
Some other race	2,059	56.8%
Two or more races	718	19.8%
Hispanic or Latino (of any race)	3,295	90.9%

=== 2010 census ===
As of the 2010 census, there were 3,246 people, 774 households, and 675 families living in the city. The population density was 1,813.4 inhabitants per square mile (700.2/km^{2}). There were 813 housing units at an average density of 454.2 per square mile (175.4/km^{2}). The racial makeup of the city was 48.6% White, 0.4% African American, 1.7% Native American, 0.5% Asian, 46.9% from other races, and 1.9% from two or more races. Hispanic or Latino of any race were 88.2% of the population.

There were 774 households, of which 66.3% had children under the age of 18 living with them, 60.2% were married couples living together, 17.6% had a female householder with no husband present, 9.4% had a male householder with no wife present, and 12.8% were non-families. 10.5% of all households were made up of individuals, and 4.5% had someone living alone who was 65 years of age or older. The average household size was 4.14 and the average family size was 4.41.

The median age in the city was 22.2 years. 43% of residents were under the age of 18; 11% were between the ages of 18 and 24; 26.4% were from 25 to 44; 14.9% were from 45 to 64; and 4.8% were 65 years of age or older. The gender makeup of the city was 50.5% male and 49.5% female.

=== 2000 census ===
As of the 2000 census, there were 2,530 people, 570 households, and 501 families living in the town. The population density was 2,019.7 people per square mile (781.5/km^{2}). There were 609 housing units at an average density of 486.2 per square mile (188.1/km^{2}). The racial makeup of the town was 20.20% White, 0.79% Native American, 76.36% from other races, and 2.65% from two or more races. Hispanic or Latino of any race were 85.53% of the population.

There were 570 households, out of which 60.5% had children under the age of 18 living with them, 68.2% were married couples living together, 13.3% had a female householder with no husband present, and 12.1% were non-families. 9.8% of all households were made up of individuals, and 4.4% had someone living alone who was 65 years of age or older. The average household size was 4.44 and the average family size was 4.69.

In the town the age distribution of the population shows 43.0% under the age of 18, 14.2% from 18 to 24, 25.5% from 25 to 44, 12.2% from 45 to 64, and 5.1% who were 65 years of age or older. The median age was 21 years. For every 100 females, there were 105.5 males. For every 100 females age 18 and over, there were 101.8 males.

The median income for a household in the town was $26,250, and the median income for a family was $28,026. Males had a median income of $21,458 versus $20,000 for females. The per capita income for the town was $8,111. About 28.5% of families and 34.3% of the population were below the poverty line, including 43.3% of those under age 18 and 21.4% of those age 65 or over.

== Art ==
There are 32 life-size dinosaur models on display around the town of Granger. They are constructed from a skeleton of steel rods and chicken wire which is then packed with a cement mix. The idea of using a dinosaur exhibit to attract tourists was first proposed in 1993 and the first dinosaur—a juvenile brontosaurus in Hisey Park—was installed in 1994.

== Media ==
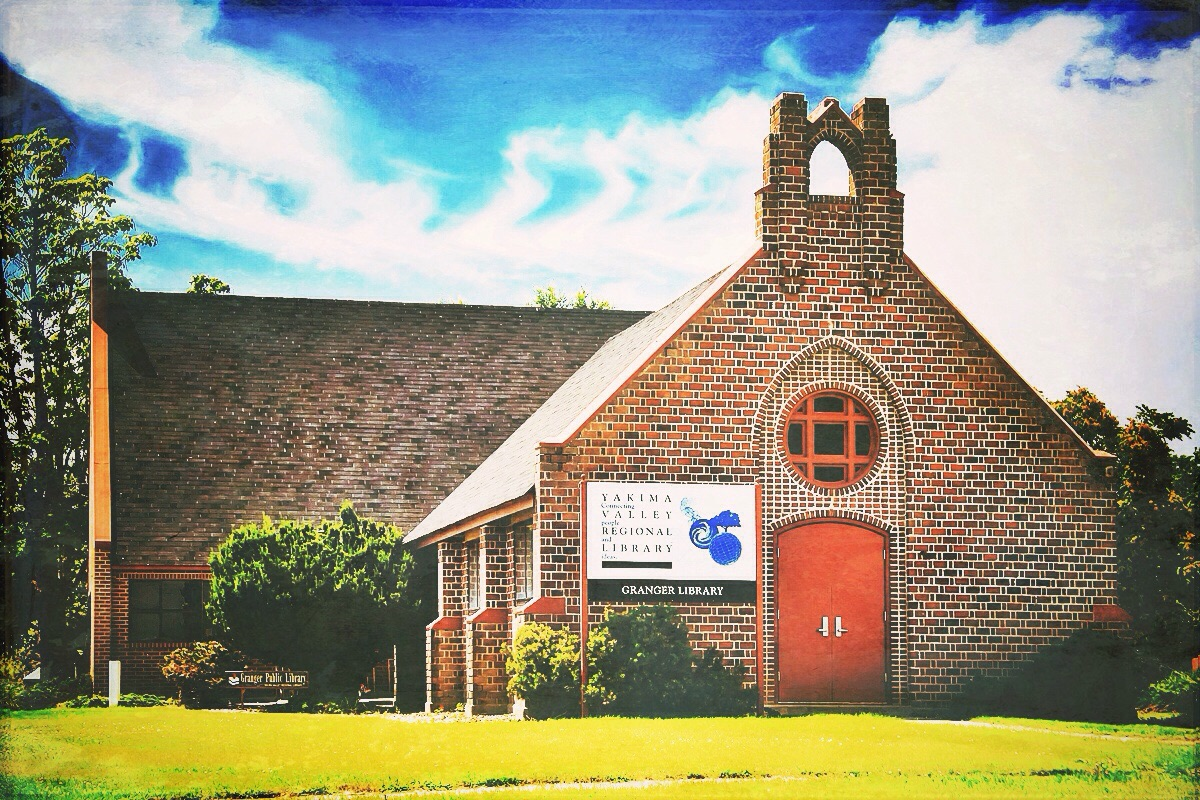
The Yakima Valley Libraries branch in Granger

Granger is home to a branch of the Yakima Valley Libraries system that is located in a former Catholic church. The city's museum shared the same building until a new facility was opened in 2024.

The Latin radio station "Radio Cadena" or "Radio KDNA" building is in the town of Granger, and was first built in 1979. It was an activist radio station that educated farm workers, advocated farm workers' organizations, and provided Spanish language programs to non-English speaking families. In 2008, a new station building was built.

== Notable people ==
- Fred Oldfield, a cowboy and noted artist, is originally from Alfalfa, a subdivision of Granger.
