= White Swan, Washington =

- CDP
- Location of White Swan, Washington
- Coordinates: 46°23′40″N 120°42′11″W
- Country: United States
- State: Washington
- County: Yakima

Area
  - Total: 103.3 sq mi (267.6 km^{2})
  - Land: 103.3 sq mi (267.6 km^{2})
  - Water: 0 sq mi (0.0 km^{2})
- Elevation: 991 ft (302 m)

Population (2020)
  - Total: 789
  - Density: 7.64/sq mi (2.95/km^{2})
- Time zone: UTC-8 (Pacific (PST))
  - Summer (DST): UTC-7 (PDT)
- ZIP code: 98952
- Area code: 509
- FIPS code: 53-78365
- GNIS feature ID: 2409586

White Swan is a census-designated place (CDP) in Yakima County, Washington, United States. The population was 789 at the 2020 census.

== History ==
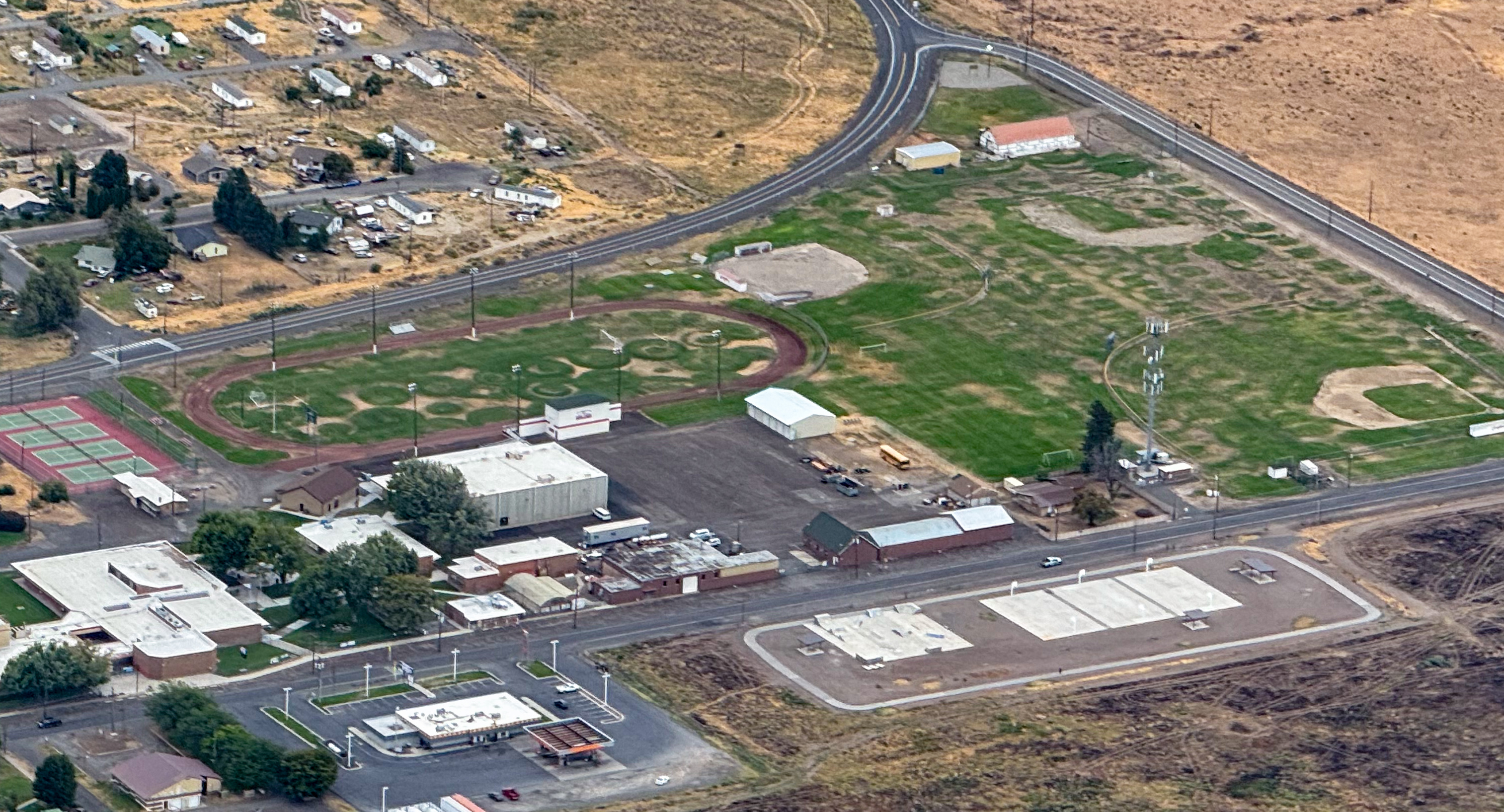
White Swan High School

White Swan is an unincorporated community located on the Yakama Indian Reservation, presumably named after Chief White Swan of the Yakamas around the start of the 20th century. The town was on the Mt Adams Highway (an overland road between Yakima and The Dalles beginning in the 1850s) between Union Gap and Fort Simcoe. In September 1921, the Christian Church (Disciples of Christ) opened the Yakima Indian Christian Mission. In 1967, the former childcare facilities of the Mission were leased to the Sundown M Corporation. Using the registered cattle brand of the Mission (from the years it owned cattle), the Sundown M Ranch began serving recovering alcoholics in 1968. Pacific Power & Light Company first brought electricity to the community in 1928. The White Swan Library (a branch of the Yakima Valley Regional library) was established in 1947. It was moved to a donated facility in 1969 where it stands today. White Swan is part of the Mt Adams School District #209, and home of White Swan High School. The town has never been formally incorporated.

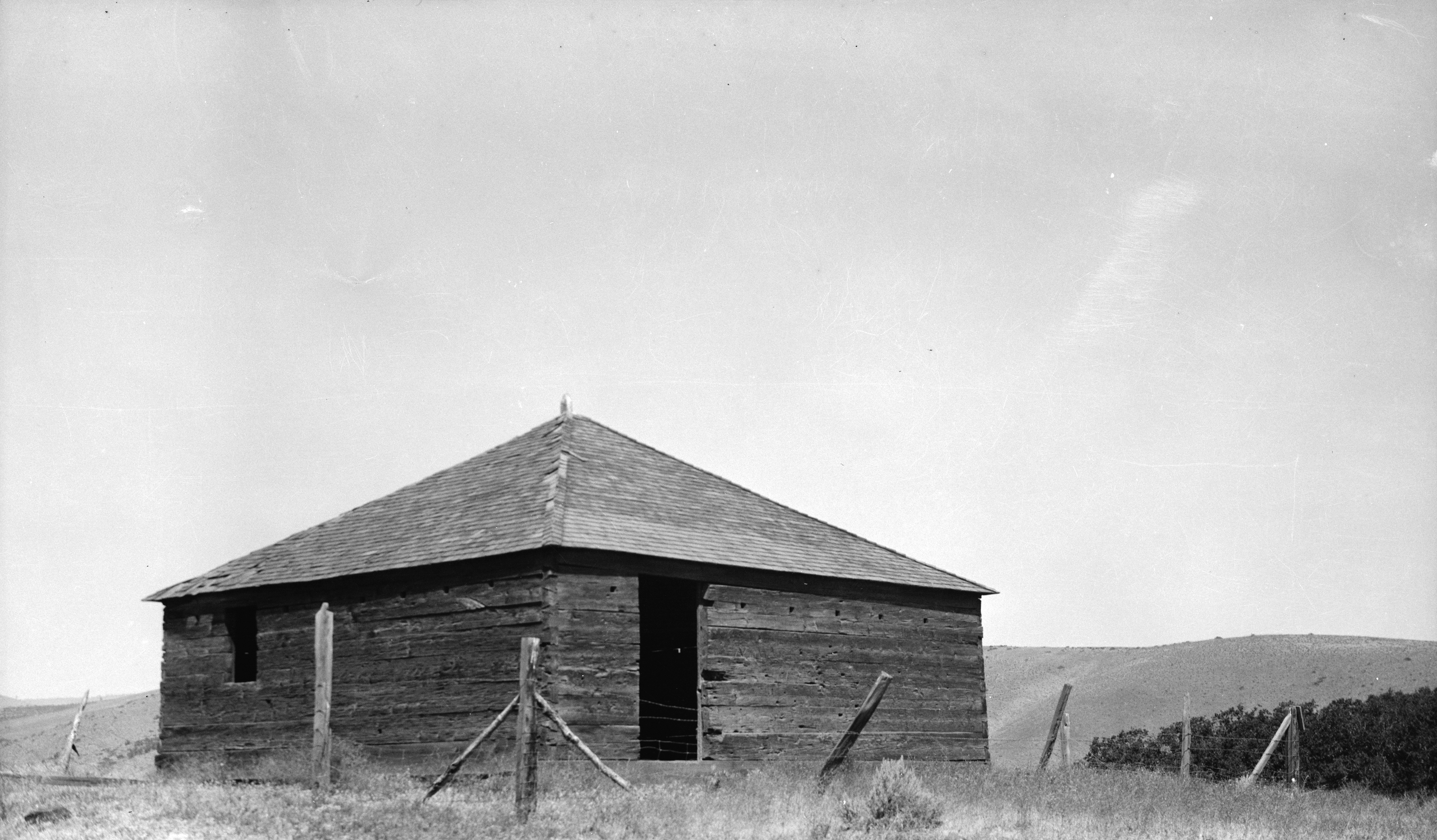
The Blockhouse at Fort Simcoe dating from around 1858

== Geography ==
According to the United States Census Bureau, the CDP has a total area of 103.3 square miles (267.6 km^{2}), all of it land.

=== Climate ===
This region experiences warm (but not hot) and dry summers, with no average monthly temperatures above 71.6 °F. According to the Köppen Climate Classification system, White Swan has a warm-summer Mediterranean climate, abbreviated "Csb" on climate maps.

Climate data for White Swan
Month	Jan	Feb	Mar	Apr	May	Jun	Jul	Aug	Sep	Oct	Nov	Dec	Year
Record high °F (°C)	66 (19)	70 (21)	80 (27)	92 (33)	100 (38)	104 (40)	111 (44)	107 (42)	98 (37)	90 (32)	74 (23)	64 (18)	111 (44)
Mean daily maximum °F (°C)	36.9 (2.7)	46.2 (7.9)	56.1 (13.4)	65.1 (18.4)	73.9 (23.3)	80.1 (26.7)	88.1 (31.2)	86.4 (30.2)	78.3 (25.7)	65.8 (18.8)	49.4 (9.7)	41.5 (5.3)	64 (18)
Mean daily minimum °F (°C)	19.8 (−6.8)	26.3 (−3.2)	31.5 (−0.3)	36.5 (2.5)	42.1 (5.6)	48 (9)	51.7 (10.9)	50.1 (10.1)	45.2 (7.3)	36.2 (2.3)	29 (−2)	25.1 (−3.8)	36.8 (2.7)
Record low °F (°C)	−30 (−34)	−24 (−31)	3 (−16)	17 (−8)	24 (−4)	30 (−1)	33 (1)	34 (1)	22 (−6)	10 (−12)	1 (−17)	−20 (−29)	−30 (−34)
Average precipitation inches (mm)	1.5 (38)	1 (25)	0.64 (16)	0.53 (13)	0.29 (7.4)	0.57 (14)	0.2 (5.1)	0.22 (5.6)	0.24 (6.1)	0.51 (13)	1.11 (28)	1.69 (43)	8.51 (216)
Average snowfall inches (cm)	11.7 (30)	3.5 (8.9)	1.3 (3.3)	0 (0)	0 (0)	0 (0)	0 (0)	0 (0)	0 (0)	0.1 (0.25)	2.5 (6.4)	10.7 (27)	29.8 (76)
Average precipitation days	7	6	4	3	2	3	1	2	2	3	6	8	47

== Demographics ==
Historical population
Census	Pop.	Note	%±
1990	2,669		—
2000	3,033		13.6%
2010	793		−73.9%
2020	789		−0.5%
U.S. Decennial Census

As of the census of 2000, there were 3,033 people, 775 households, and 658 families residing in the CDP. The population density was 29.4 people per square mile (11.3/km^{2}). There were 831 housing units at an average density of 8.0/sq mi (3.1/km^{2}). The racial makeup of the CDP was 26.24% White, 0.30% African American, 59.28% Native American, 0.26% Asian, 0.03% Pacific Islander, 8.14% from other races, and 5.74% from two or more races. Hispanic or Latino of any race were 15.99% of the population.

There were 775 households, out of which 49.4% had children under the age of 18 living with them, 55.2% were married couples living together, 18.6% had a female householder with no husband present, and 15.0% were non-families. 10.8% of all households were made up of individuals, and 4.0% had someone living alone who was 65 years of age or older. The average household size was 3.91 and the average family size was 4.15.

In the CDP, the population was spread out, with 40.0% under the age of 18, 9.9% from 18 to 24, 26.4% from 25 to 44, 18.0% from 45 to 64, and 5.7% who were 65 years of age or older. The median age was 25 years. For every 100 females, there were 102.3 males. For every 100 females age 18 and over, there were 101.4 males.

The median income for a household in the CDP was $35,189, and the median income for a family was $35,333. Males had a median income of $31,250 versus $22,763 for females. The per capita income for the CDP was $10,623. About 23.8% of families and 27.0% of the population were below the poverty line, including 30.4% of those under age 18 and 21.7% of those age 65 or over.

== Notable residents ==
- Nipo T. Strongheart, performer in Wild West shows, born in White Swan
- Black Lodge Singers, Native American northern drum group
