= Mabton, Washington =

Village in Washington, United States

- City
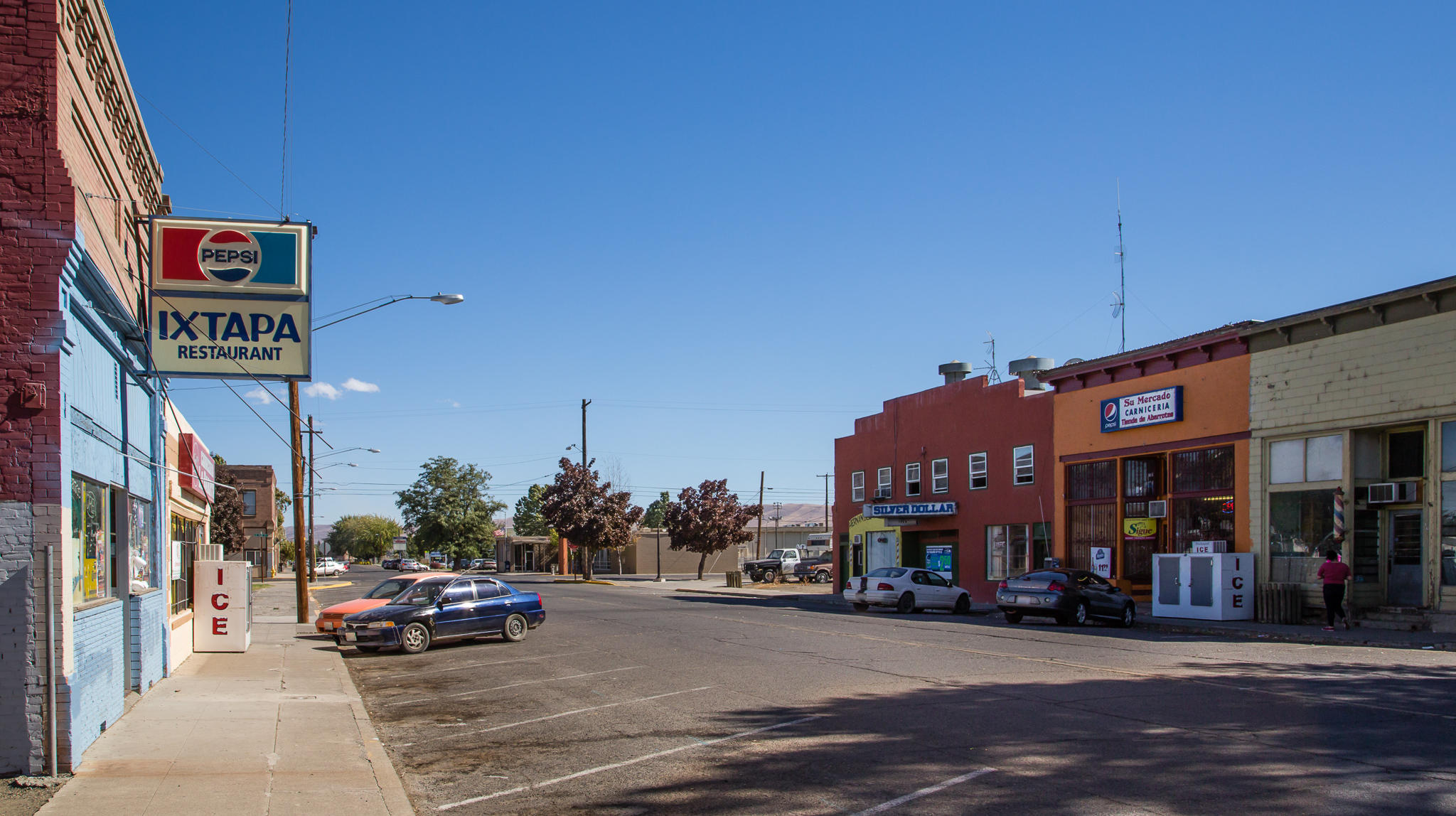
- Main Street
- Motto: "Building a Better Mabton!"
- Interactive map of Mabton, Washington
- Location within Washington (state) Location within the United States
- Coordinates: 46.211546°N 119.993912°W
- Country: United States
- State: Washington
- County: Yakima
- Founded: 1884
- Incorporated: November 7, 1905

Government
  - Type: Mayor–council
  - Mayor: Martha Gonzalez
  - Mayor Pro-Tem: Ruben Olivarez

Area
  - Total: 0.842 sq mi (2.182 km^{2})
  - Land: 0.842 sq mi (2.182 km^{2})
  - Water: 0 sq mi (0.000 km^{2}) 0.0%
- Elevation: 719 ft (219 m)

Population (2020)
  - Total: 1,959
  - Estimate (2024): 1,960
  - Density: 2,325/sq mi (897.8/km^{2})
- Time zone: UTC−8 (Pacific (PST))
  - Summer (DST): UTC−7 (PDT)
- ZIP Code: 98935
- Area code: 509
- FIPS code: 53-40980
- GNIS feature ID: 2410904
- Website: cityofmabton.com

Mabton is a city in Yakima County, Washington, United States. The population was 1,959 at the 2020 census, and was estimated at 1,960 in 2024.

Incorporated during the first few years of the 20th century, it is located at the eastern edge of the Yakama Indian Reservation.

== History ==
The Mabton area's original inhabitants were the Yakama people, who were forced onto a reservation in 1855. Mabton's existence as a town is due to the Northern Pacific Railway, which arrived in the area around 1884 and built a water tower and section house on the site. Nothing else existed at Mabton until 1892 when Sam P. Flower built a store and a warehouse. He soon became the town's first postmaster. Mabton was named by Charlie Sandburg, a Swedish railworker, who proposed the name "Mabletown" for the wife (or daughter) of a railroad official who had spoken kind words to track workers during an inspection. By 1895, Mabton had several stores, a hotel, a railroad depot and a schoolhouse. The Mabton Townsite Company, formed by Sam P. Flower and J.A. Humphrey, made the first plat in 1902, and by 1904, it had more than a dozen businesses and a newspaper. The town of Mabton officially incorporated on November 7, 1905.

Today, residents primarily are employed in occupations related to agriculture, especially hop growing and grape growing.

The Mabton School District has been the repeated beneficiary of grants from the Bill and Melinda Gates Foundation:

- $558,000 over five years (from 2000 to 2005) to enhance student access to technology;
- In 2001, Mabton High School was one of sixteen high schools chosen to participate in the Washington State Achievers Program; the school gets a share proportional to its student population (about 330 students) of more than $9 million to support school improvement and redesign efforts and more than $100 million for college scholarships for its students;
- Over $40,000 over five years (2001–2006) to improve high school education and access to higher education; and
- Over $125,000 over 34 months (2001–2004) to support professional development programs in partnership with Heritage College.

A small ranch near Mabton was home to the first confirmed case of mad cow disease in the United States on December 23, 2003, later confirmed to be a cow of Canadian origin imported to the U.S.

== Geography ==
According to the United States Census Bureau, the city has a total area of 0.843 square miles (2.18 km^{2}), all land.

Mabton is located at the east end of the Yakama Indian Reservation and south of the Yakima River near Sunnyside and Grandview.

== Demographics ==
Historical population
Census	Pop.	Note	%±
1910	666		—
1920	547		−17.9%
1930	423		−22.7%
1940	485		14.7%
1950	831		71.3%
1960	958		15.3%
1970	926		−3.3%
1980	1,248		34.8%
1990	1,482		18.8%
2000	1,891		27.6%
2010	2,286		20.9%
2020	1,959		−14.3%
2024 (est.)	1,960		0.1%
U.S. Decennial Census; 2020 Census

As of the 2024 American Community Survey, there are 583 estimated households in Mabton with an average of 4.33 persons per household. The city has a median household income of $56,875. Approximately 27.8% of the city's population lives at or below the poverty line. Mabton has an estimated 55.5% employment rate, with 3.1% of the population holding a bachelor's degree or higher and 53.0% holding a high school diploma. There were 603 housing units at an average density of 715.30 per square mile (276.2/km^{2}).

The top five reported languages (people were allowed to report up to two languages, thus the figures will generally add to more than 100%) were English (22.6%), Spanish (77.4%), Indo-European (0.0%), Asian and Pacific Islander (0.0%), and Other (0.0%).

The median age in the city was 23.3 years.

Mabton, Washington – racial and ethnic composition Note: the US Census treats Hispanic/Latino as an ethnic category. This table excludes Latinos from the racial categories and assigns them to a separate category. Hispanics/Latinos may be of any race.
Race / ethnicity (NH = non-Hispanic)	Pop. 1980	Pop. 1990	Pop. 2000	Pop. 2010	Pop. 2020
White alone (NH)	419 (33.57%)	270 (18.22%)	184 (9.73%)	161 (7.04%)	96 (4.90%)
Black or African American alone (NH)	0 (0.00%)	0 (0.00%)	2 (0.11%)	7 (0.31%)	0 (0.00%)
Native American or Alaska Native alone (NH)	—	9 (0.61%)	3 (0.16%)	1 (0.04%)	4 (0.20%)
Asian alone (NH)	—	7 (0.47%)	12 (0.63%)	3 (0.13%)	4 (0.20%)
Pacific Islander alone (NH)	—	—	0 (0.00%)	0 (0.00%)	0 (0.00%)
Other race alone (NH)	13 (1.04%)	9 (0.61%)	0 (0.00%)	5 (0.22%)	2 (0.10%)
Mixed race or multiracial (NH)	—	—	7 (0.37%)	9 (0.39%)	10 (0.51%)
Hispanic or Latino (any race)	816 (65.38%)	1,187 (80.09%)	1,683 (89.00%)	2,100 (91.86%)	1,843 (94.08%)
Total	1,248 (100.00%)	1,482 (100.00%)	1,891 (100.00%)	2,286 (100.00%)	1,959 (100.00%)

=== 2020 census ===
As of the 2020 census, there were 1,959 people, 506 households, and 449 families residing in the city. The population density was 2,323.84 inhabitants per square mile (897.2/km^{2}). There were 558 housing units at an average density of 661.92 per square mile (255.6/km^{2}). The racial makeup of the city was 22.92% White, 0.20% African American, 2.50% Native American, 0.20% Asian, 0.00% Pacific Islander, 51.91% from some other races and 22.26% from two or more races. Hispanic or Latino people of any race were 94.08% of the population.

There were 506 households, of which 61.5% had children under the age of 18 living in them, 51.4% were married couples living together, 28.3% had a female householder with no husband present, 9.5% had a male householder and no wife present, and _% were non-families. 7.5% of all households were made up of individuals, and 3.4% had someone living alone who was 65 years of age or older. The average household size was 4._ and the average family size was 4._.

The median age in the city was 27.5 years. 35.2% of residents were under the age of 18 and 9.2% of residents were 65 years of age or older. For every 100 females there were 100.7 males, and for every 100 females age 18 and over there were 94.5 males age 18 and over.

0.0% of residents lived in urban areas, while 100.0% lived in rural areas.

There were 558 housing units, of which 9.3% were vacant. The homeowner vacancy rate was 0.9% and the rental vacancy rate was 7.5%.

=== 2010 census ===
As of the 2010 census, there were 2,286 people, 528 households, and 478 families residing in the city. The population density was 2,861.08 inhabitants per square mile (1,104.7/km^{2}). There were 548 housing units at an average density of 685.86 per square mile (264.8/km^{2}). The racial makeup of the city was 46.94% White, 0.70% African American, 0.17% Native American, 0.17% Asian, 0.00% Pacific Islander, 48.38% from some other races and 3.63% from two or more races. Hispanic or Latino people of any race were 91.86% of the population.

There were 528 households, of which 69.1% had children under the age of 18 living with them, 55.9% were married couples living together, 25.0% had a female householder with no husband present, 9.7% had a male householder with no wife present, and 9.5% were non-families. 7.0% of all households were made up of individuals, and 3.6% had someone living alone who was 65 years of age or older. The average household size was 4.31 and the average family size was 4.41.

The median age in the city was 23.6 years. 39.4% of residents were under the age of 18; 12.5% were between the ages of 18 and 24; 25.9% were from 25 to 44; 16.5% were from 45 to 64; and 5.8% were 65 years of age or older. The gender makeup of the city was 49.0% male and 51.0% female.

=== 2000 census ===
As of the 2000 census, there were 1,891 people, 445 households, and 381 families residing in the city. The population density was 4,026.33 inhabitants per square mile (1,554.6/km^{2}). There were 463 housing units at an average density of 985.82 per square mile (380.6/km^{2}). The racial makeup of the city was 21.73% White, 0.11% African American, 0.48% Native American, 1.00% Asian, 0.00% Pacific Islander, 73.88% from some other races and 2.80% from two or more races. Hispanic or Latino people of any race were 89.00% of the population.

There were 445 households, out of which 60.0% had children under the age of 18 living with them, 59.3% were married couples living together, 17.3% had a woman whose husband does not live with her, and 14.2% were non-families. 12.4% of all households were made up of individuals, and 5.8% had someone living alone who was 65 years of age or older. The average household size was 4.22 and the average family size was 4.54.

In the city, the population was spread out, with 41.9% under the age of 18, 12.9% from 18 to 24, 25.8% from 25 to 44, 12.9% from 45 to 64, and 6.5% who were 65 years of age or older. The median age was 22 years. For every 100 females, there were 104.0 males. For every 100 females age 18 and over, there were 104.1 males.

The median income for a household in the city was $26,650, and the median income for a family was $26,198. Males had a median income of $18,917 versus $21,667 for females. The per capita income for the city was $7,694. 32.7% of the population and 27.9% of families were below the poverty line. Out of the total people living in poverty, 44.0% were under the age of 18 and 18.2% were 65 or older.

== Education ==
The city's library is open six afternoons and three evenings per week. In a space of about 1,260 sq ft (117 m^{2}) it has over 5,000 volumes of hardback books, over 2000 paperbacks, and 26 magazine subscriptions. Many of its books and magazines are in Spanish.

== Notable people ==
- Rachel Ruelas, mayor
- Mel Stottlemyre, a pitcher and later a pitching coach for the New York Yankees
