= Yakama Indian Reservation =

Indian reservation in Washington, United States

Confederated Tribes and Bands of the Yakama Nation
- Indian reservation
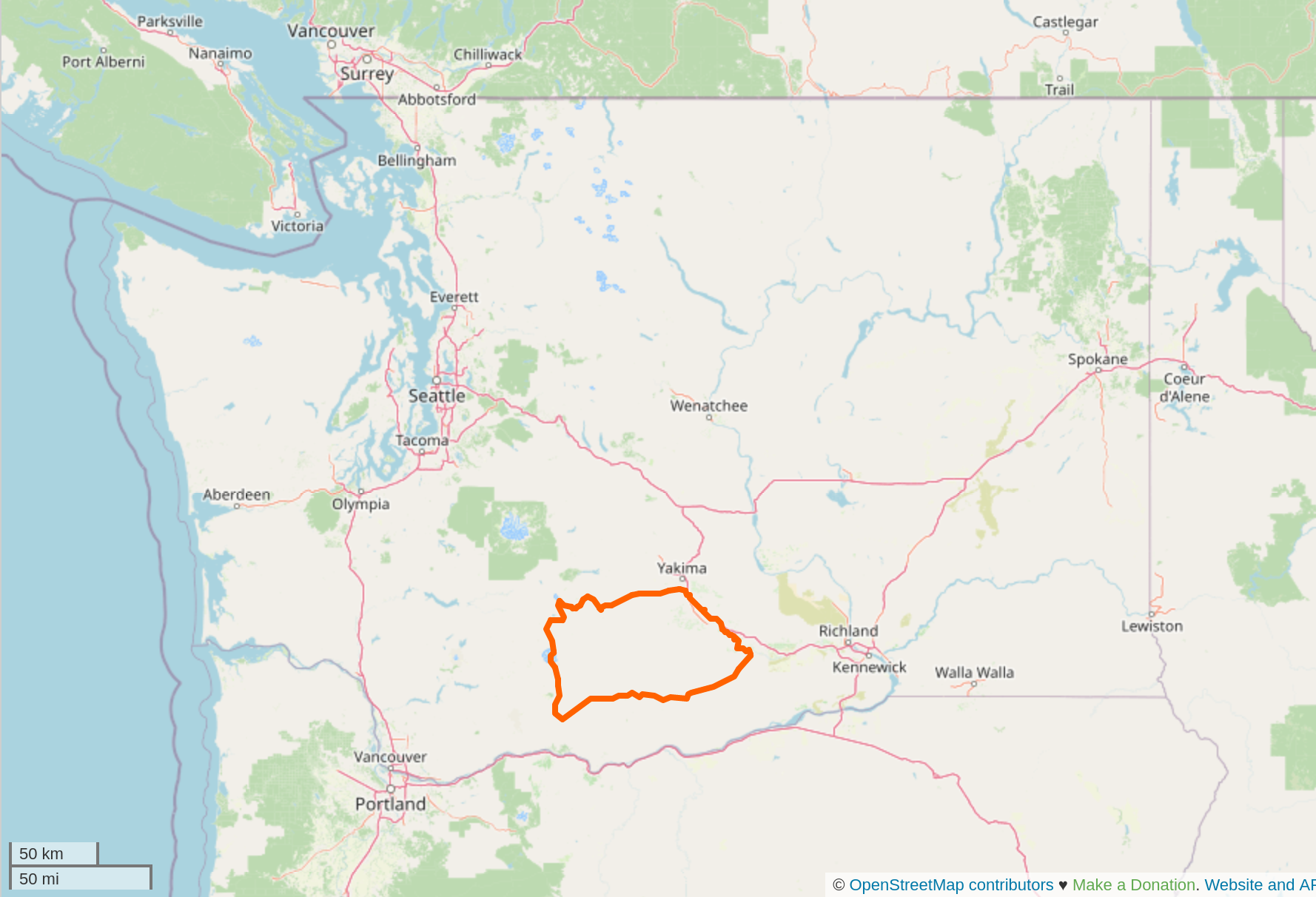
- Location of the Yakama Indian Reservation within Washington
- Coordinates: 46°14′00″N 120°49′19″W
- Country: United States
- State: Washington
- Negotiated: c. 1855

Government
  - Body: Yakama Nation Tribal Council

Population (2020)
  - Total: 31,591
- Website: www.yakama.com

Confederated Tribes and Bands of the Yakama Nation
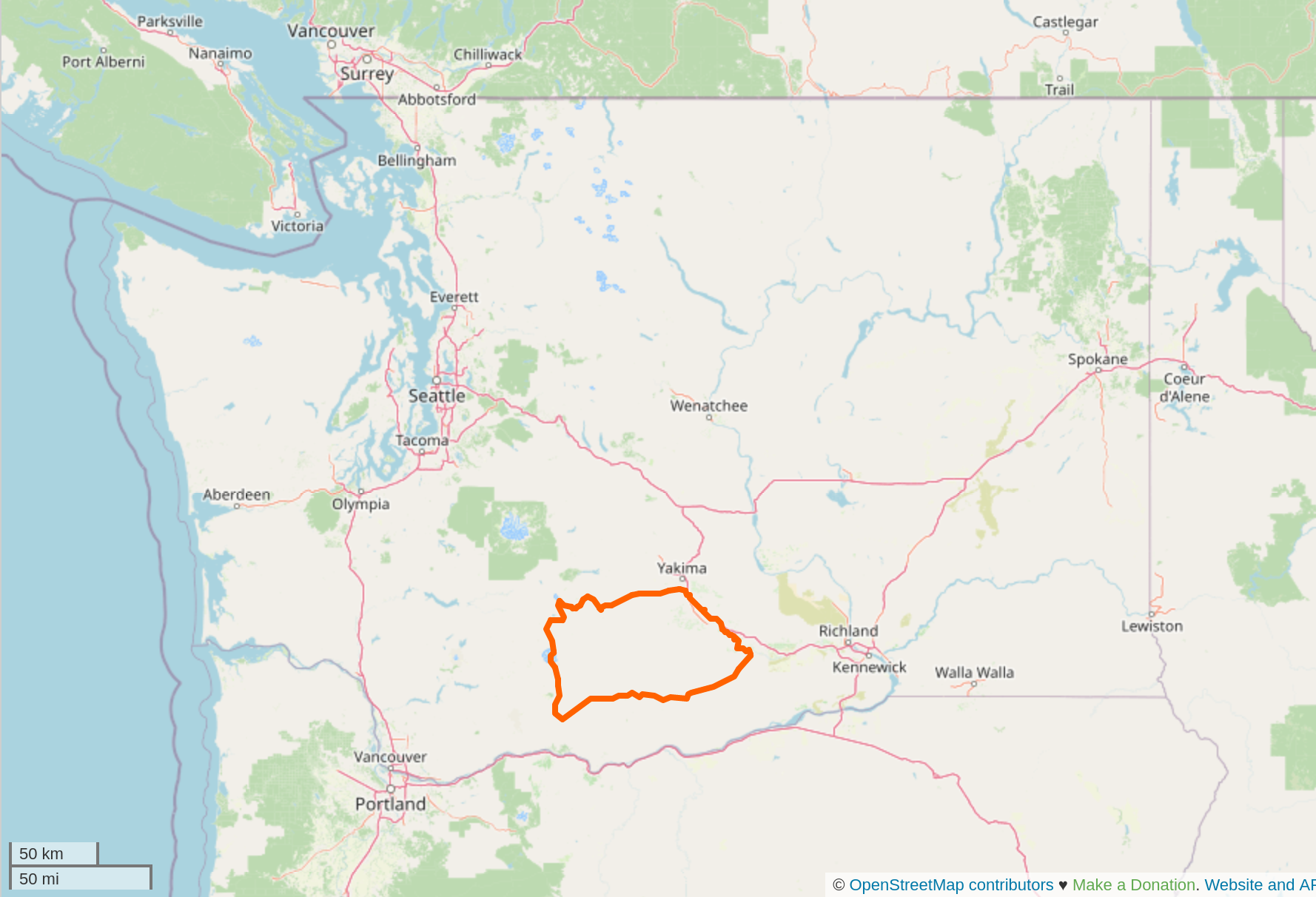
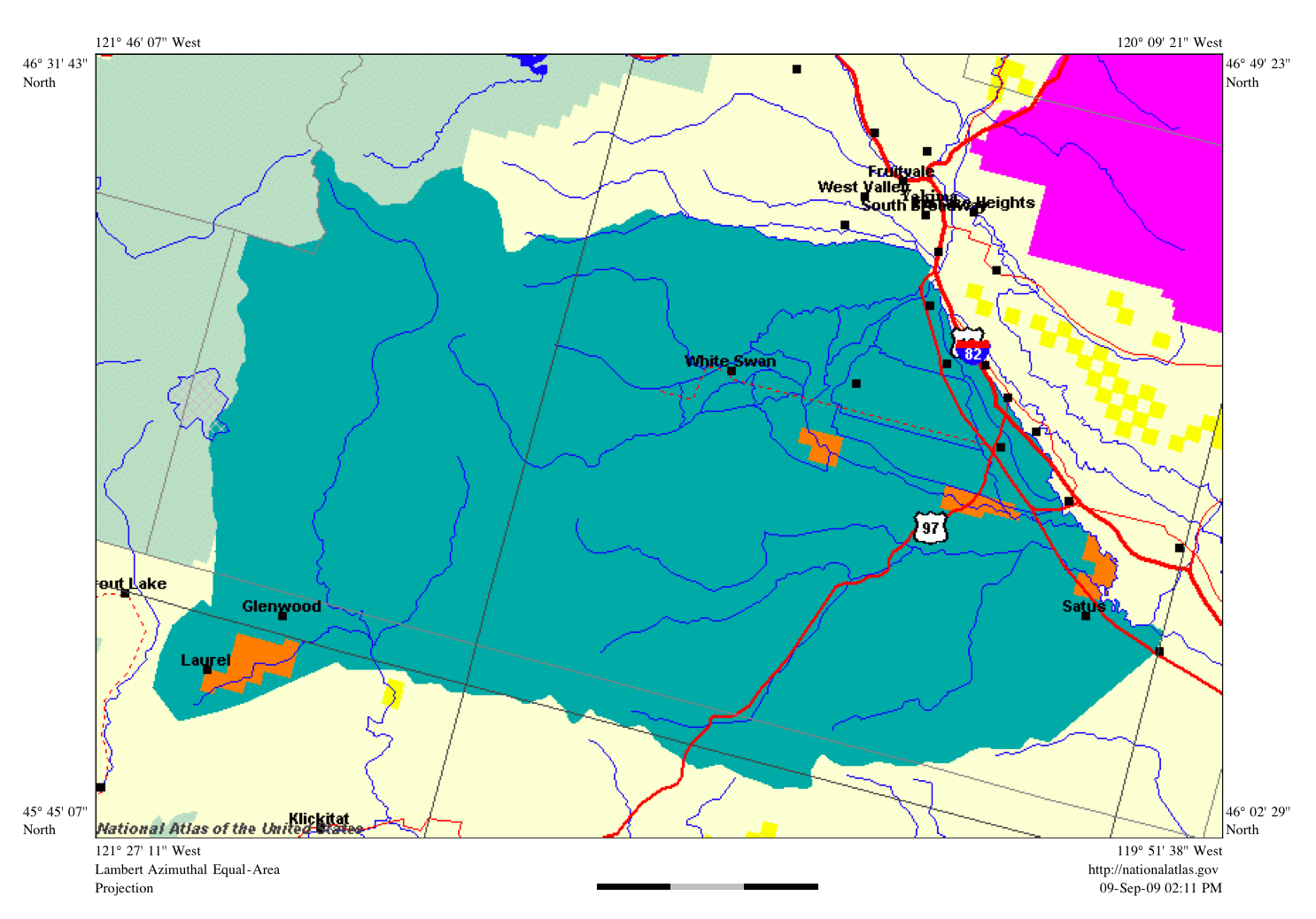
- Map of the Yakama Indian Reservation

Total population
- 31,799 (2000)

Regions with significant populations
- United States (Washington)

Languages
- English, Spanish, Ichishkíin Sínwit

Related ethnic groups
- other Klikitat, Palus, Wallawalla, Wenatchi, Wishram, and Yakama peoples

The Yakama Indian Reservation (spelled Yakima until 1994) is a Native American reservation in Washington state of the federally recognized tribe known as the Confederated Tribes and Bands of the Yakama Nation. The tribe is made up of Klikitat, Palus, Wallawalla, Wenatchi, Wishram, and Yakama peoples.

== Geography ==
The reservation is located on the east side of the Cascade Mountains in southern Washington state. The eastern portion of Mount Adams lies within this territory. According to the United States Census Bureau, the reservation covers 2,185.94 square miles (5,661.56 km^{2}) and the population in 2000 was 31,799. It lies primarily in Yakima and the northern edge of Klickitat counties. The largest city on the reservation is Toppenish.

About 80% of the reservation's land is held in trust by the federal government for the benefit of the tribe and tribal members. The remaining 20% of the reservation's land is privately owned.

Some 410,000 acres of the reservation are shrub-steppe rangeland; as of 2014, about 15,000 wild horses roamed these lands—an unsustainable population, many times what the land can support.

== History ==
The reservation was created in 1855 by a treaty signed by Washington Territory Gov. Isaac Stevens and representatives of the Yakama tribe. Several Native leaders believed that those representatives did not have the authority to cede communal land and had not properly gained consensus from the full council or tribe. A dispute over the treaty conditions led to the Yakima War (1855–1858), which the Yakama and allied tribes waged against the United States.

Following the Bannock War of 1878, the United States government forced the Northern Paiute people out of Nevada and onto the Yakama Reservation, although most had not been involved in the war. The more than 500 Paiute in Washington were subjected to privation for more than a decade before being allowed to return to Nevada. They were forced to compete for the limited resources and housing on the reservation with peoples who had been established there for decades. The Paiute did not return to Nevada until the 1886 expansion of the Duck Valley Indian Reservation permitted them to reunite with their Western Shoshone brethren.

In 1994, the Yakima Tribal Council unanimously voted to change the spelling of the tribe's name from Yakima to Yakama, matching the spelling of the 1855 treaty. The pronunciation remained the same.

The Yakama reservation was affected by the Cougar Creek fire, one of the 2015 Washington wildfires. About 80% of the Cougar Creek fire burned on reservation land. The Yakama responded by salvage logging.

== Membership ==
Roughly 10,000 people were enrolled members of the Yakama Nation in 2009. The required blood quantum for tribal membership is 1/4.

== Economy ==
The Yakama Nation suffers from high poverty and unemployment; a 2005 report indicated that 42.8% of Yakama Nation families lived in poverty. As of 2017, there was a wait list of 1,800 families for tribal housing, and high rates of homelessness. In 2016, an encampment at the reservation was set up by about 130 people evicted from tribal housing. Members of the tribe responded by building tiny houses, but the structures do not have plumbing and are not viewed as a permanent solution.

The tribe undertakes forest management activities, including a lumber mill that supports several hundred jobs in the region. The tribe owns one of the largest commercial forests in the country, which makes up a sizable percent of the tribe's income.

The tribe operates a casino, one of the few Native American casinos in the United States that are "dry" (alcohol-free).

The Yakama Nation is one of several tribal governments in the northwestern United States to offer free bus service on its reservation.

== Law and government ==
The governance of the tribe is the responsibility of a 14-member tribal council, elected by a vote of the tribe's members.

In 1963, most criminal and civil jurisdiction over tribal members was transferred from the tribe to the Washington state government under Public Law 280. (Misdemeanors and traffic infractions continued to be handled by the tribe.) From 1983 to April 1993, thirteen women were killed on the reservation, and two other women disappeared in the early 1990s; none of the cases were solved, fueling native distrust of the FBI.

In 2016, full criminal jurisdiction over tribal members reverted to the tribe, along with jurisdiction over the five civil areas of "compulsory school attendance, public assistance, domestic relations, juvenile delinquency and operations of motor vehicles on public roads and highways on the reservation."

The Yakama Nation bans alcohol on tribal land, including its casino and convenience store, as well as on tribal powwows and other ceremonies. In 2000, the tribal council voted to extend its alcohol ban to the entirety of the 1.2-million-acre reservation, including private land owned by the estimated 20,000 non-tribal members who lived on the reservation. Washington state, represented by its state attorney general, sued the tribe. The suit was dismissed on ripeness grounds, because the ban had not yet been enforced against non-tribal members or on privately owned land. In 2001, the acting U.S. Attorney for the Eastern District of Washington issued an opinion letter stating that federal prosecutors would enforce existing federal liquor laws, but would not enforce a ban on the sale of alcohol on privately owned, non-Indian communities within the reservation.

The reservation has struggled with substance abuse over a series of decades. Although the recreational use of marijuana is generally legal in Washington state under Initiative 502 (enacted by voters in 2012), the Yakama have sought to block the issuance of licenses for the legal marijuana cultivation and sales on their lands; in 2014, the tribe filed challenges to almost 1,300 pending applications for marijuana business licenses in the 10-county area on which the reservation is located.

== Crime and public safety ==
In February 2018, the Yakama tribal council Yakamas passed a resolution declared a public safety crisis in response to a surge of crime on the reservation, particularly in White Swan. The resolution sought to impose greater penalties on tribal members who commit crimes (including the loss of treaty rights to hunt and fish, as well as banishment from the tribe) and stated that non-members who committed crimes on the reservation could be excluded from the reservation.

In June 2019, the tribal council said that the reservation was plagued by drug use and violent crime, as well as "disregard for the rule of law and general civil unrest" and responded by imposing a youth curfew, establishing a telephone hotline for reporting crime, and increasing penalties for theft and assault. The announcement came after five people were killed in White Swan on the reservation in a shooting earlier that month.

== Communities ==
- Glenwood
- Harrah
- Parker
- Satus
- Tampico (part)
- Toppenish
- Union Gap (part)
- Wapato
- White Swan
