= Agriculture in Washington (state) =

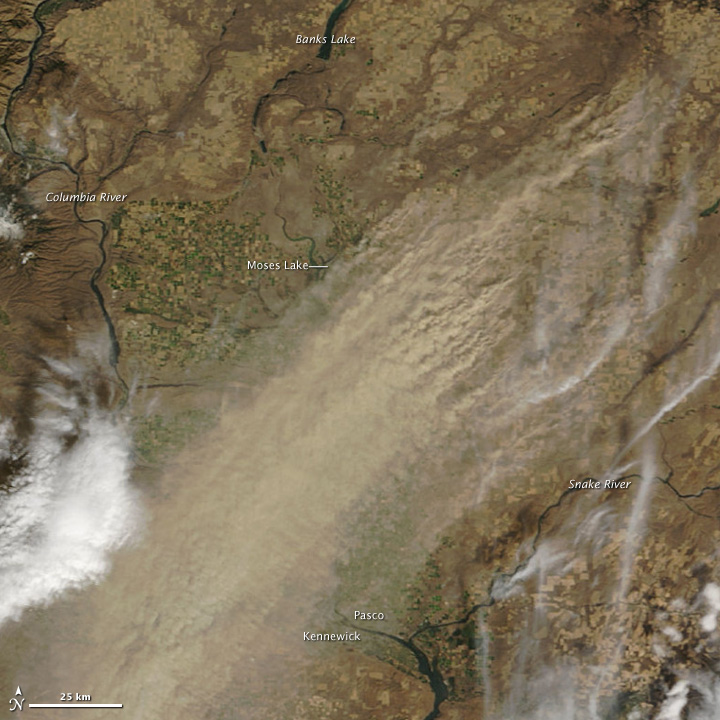
Dryland farming caused a large dust storm in parts of Eastern Washington on October 4, 2009.

The US state of Washington is a leading agricultural producer.

== Production ==
(The following figures are from the Washington State Office of Financial Management and the USDA, National Agricultural Statistics Service, Washington Field Office). For 2003, the total value of Washington's agricultural products was $5.79 billion, the 11th highest in the country. The total value of its crops was $3.8 billion, the 7th highest. The total value of its livestock and specialty products was $1.5 billion, the 26th highest. In 2010, the total value of the crops was $7.93 billion.

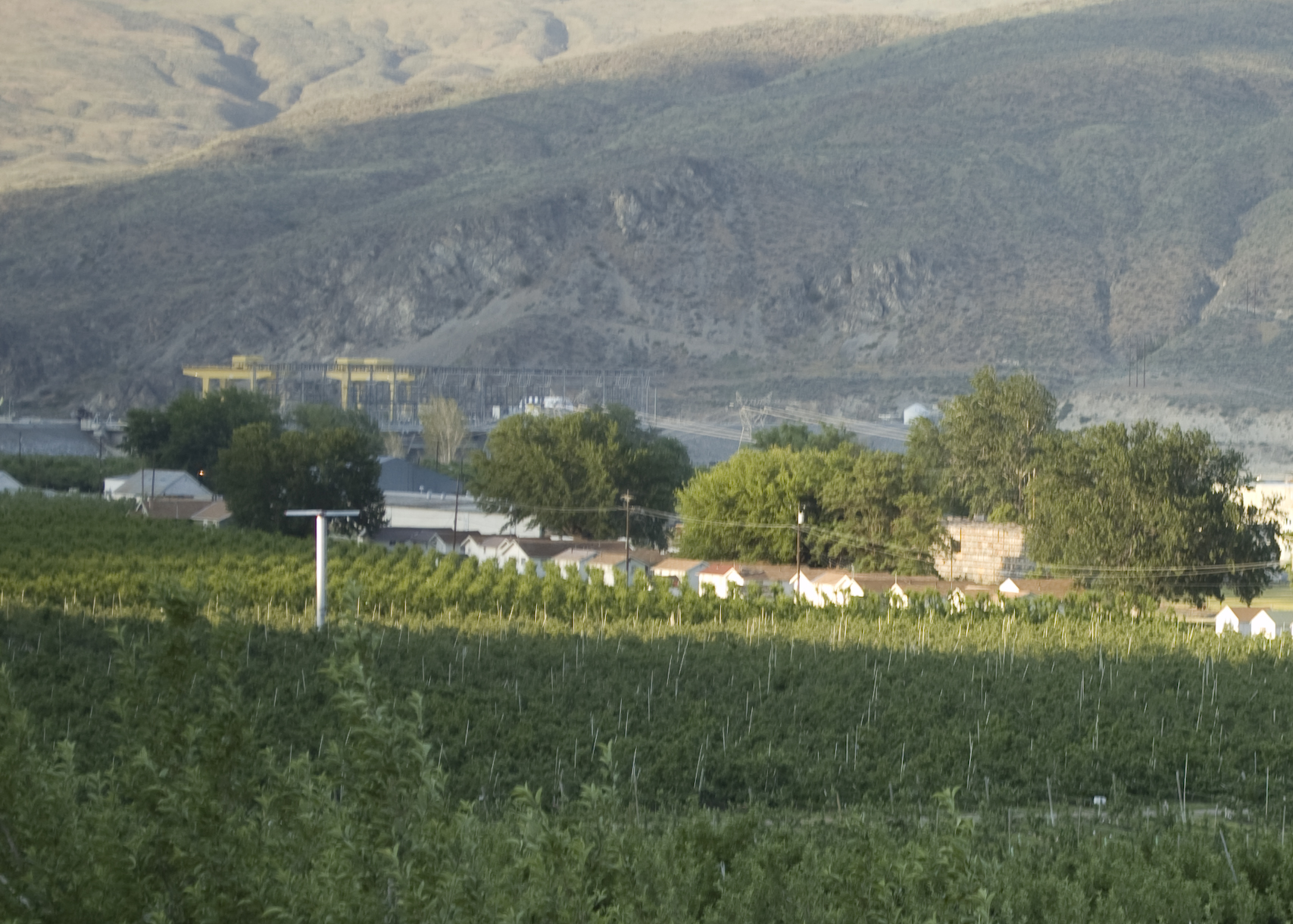
Azwell, Washington, a small community of pickers' cabins and apple orchards. Wells Dam visible in background.

In 2004, Washington ranked first in the nation in production of red raspberries (90.0% of total U.S. production), wrinkled seed peas (80.6%), hops (75.0%), spearmint oil (73.6%), apples (58.1%), sweet cherries (47.3%), pears (42.6%), peppermint oil (40.3%), Concord grapes (39.3%), carrots for processing (36.8%), and Niagara grapes (31.6%). Washington also ranked second in the nation in production of lentils, fall potatoes, dry edible peas, apricots, grapes (all varieties taken together), asparagus (over a third of the nation's production), sweet corn for processing, and green peas for processing; third in tart cherries, prunes and plums, and dry summer onions; fourth in barley and trout; and fifth in wheat, cranberries, and strawberries.

=== Apples ===
The apple industry is of particular importance to Washington. Because of the favorable climate of dry, warm summers and cold winters of Central Washington, the state has led the U.S. in apple production since the 1920s. Two areas in Eastern Washington – the Yakima River valley and the Wenatchee River valley – account for the vast majority of the state's apple crop. The Washington Apple Commission regulates the industry.

=== Cannabis ===
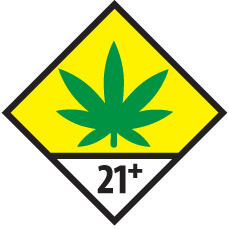
Washington's Cannabis Universal Symbol

Cannabis in Washington relates to a number of legislative, legal, and cultural events surrounding the use of cannabis (marijuana, (Note: This article uses the terms "cannabis" and "marijuana" interchangeably. No distinction is intended.) hashish, THC, kief, etc.). On December 6, 2012, Washington became the first U.S. state to legalize recreational use of marijuana and the first to allow recreational marijuana sales, alongside Colorado. (Note: Both Washington and Colorado voted to legalize recreational cannabis on November 6, 2012, but the new laws took effect on December 6 in Washington and December 10 in Colorado. However, adult-use retail sales of cannabis did not start in Washington until July 2014, while Colorado adult-use retail sales started effective January 1, 2014, making Colorado the first state to allow retail sales.) The state had previously legalized medical marijuana in 1998. Under state law, cannabis is legal for medical purposes and for any purpose by adults over 21.

=== Hemp ===
Hemp in the U.S. state of Washington has emerged as an experimental crop in the 21st century.

=== Wheat ===
Washington is a major wheat producer with 90% of production exported. This means that the health of the industry is largely dependent on global market conditions.

=== Wine ===
Washington wine is a wine produced from grape varieties grown in the U.S. state of Washington. Washington ranks third in the United States in the production of wine, behind California and New York. By 2017, the state had over 55 thousand acres (220 square kilometres) of vineyards, a harvest of 229 thousand short tons (208 thousand tonnes) of grapes, and exports going to over 40 countries around the world from the 940+ wineries located in the state. While there are some viticultural activities in the cooler, wetter western half of the state, the majority (99.9%) of wine grape production takes place in the shrub-steppe eastern half. The rain shadow of the Cascade Range leaves the Columbia River Basin with around 8 inches (20 cm) of annual rain fall, making irrigation and water rights of paramount interest to the Washington wine industry. Viticulture in the state is also influenced by long sunlight hours (on average, two more hours a day than in California during the growing season) and consistent temperatures.

The early history of the Washington wine industry can be traced to the introduction of Cinsault grapes by Italian immigrants to the Walla Walla region. Grapes are not indigenous to the Columbia Valley viticultural area, but both Vinifera and Labruscavines are grown. The oldest planted Vinifera vines still in existence were planted by German immigrants in the Tampico vicinity, west of Union Gap, in 1871. Others were planted in the Kennewick area in 1895, and in the Walla Walla area by 1899. Planting of premium Vinifera grapes began in the Columbia Valley in the mid-1960s. By 1981 there were over 6,610 acres (2,675 ha) of Vinifera grapes including 2,700 acres (1,093 ha) of cultivated vineyards. In the 1950s and 1960s, the precursors of the state's biggest wineries (Chateau Ste. Michelle and Columbia Winery) were founded. Throughout the rest of the 20th century, the wine world discovered a new aspect of Washington wines with each passing decade – starting with Rieslings and Chardonnays in the 1970s, the Merlot craze of the 1980s and the emergence of Cabernet Sauvignon and Syrah in the 1990s. Washington has twenty federally defined American Viticultural Areas (AVA) with all but one located in Eastern Washington. The largest is the Columbia Valley AVA, which extends into a small portion of northern Oregon and encompasses most of the states's AVAs. They are Lewis-Clark Valley AVA, the Ancient Lakes AVA, Walla Walla Valley AVA, which encompasses Oregon's The Rocks District of Milton-Freewater AVA, Horse Heaven Hills AVA, the Wahluke Slope AVA, Lake Chelan AVA, Naches Heights AVA, and the Yakima Valley AVA, which in turn also encompasses the Rattlesnake Hills AVA, Snipes Mountain AVA, the Red Mountain AVA, Goose Gap AVA and the Candy Mountain AVA. The Columbia Gorge AVA is west of the Columbia Valley AVA. As of 2023, Washington's only AVA located west of the Cascades is the Puget Sound AVA and a petition has been submitted to Alcohol and Tobacco Tax and Trade Bureau (TTB) proposing a new American Viticultural Area named "Mount St. Helens" covering parts of Clark County, Cowlitz County, Skamania County and Lewis County.

== See also ==
- Fruit Belt
- Tree Top
- Beacon Food Forest
- Washington Tilth Association
- Washington State University College of Agricultural, Human, and Natural Resource Sciences
