= Nora Pouillon =

Austrian-American chef and restaurateur

- Born: October 26, 1943 (age 82); Vienna, Austria
- Occupations: Chef, restaurateur

Nora Pouillon (born October 26, 1943) is an Austrian chef, restaurateur, and author. She was the owner of Restaurant Nora in Washington, D.C., famous for its status as America's first certified organic restaurant.

== Biography ==
=== Early life ===
Pouillon was born in Vienna, Austria, during World War II. Pouillon's family was affluent and owned a safety glass window factory. They were able to flee Vienna in the last years of the war. The family's refuge was a farm owned by family and friends in the Tyrolean Alps. Of this time, Pouillon says: “There, the farmers grew all of their food. It taught me how difficult that truly is. They got up with the sun and worked until sunset. They had to prepare food for the winter months. There was no electricity and no running water."

After the war, Pouillon and her family returned to Vienna, where she attended boarding school. Pouillon would continue to spend summers at the farm with her grandmother.

=== 1960s ===
In the 1960s, Pouillon moved to the United States with her husband, a French journalist. This move highlighted the stark contrast between European food, farm, and open-air market cultures versus the supermarket culture of America post-World War II. “At the stores here it was amazing to see all the prepackaged and frozen food. Nothing depended on the season. Pepperidge Farm was like gourmet bread. The produce department was the smallest section in the store.”

As the mother of young children in the 1960s and 1970s, Pouillon did daily shopping and cooking for her family. This time coincided with the modern emergence of food cooperatives in the 1960s providing alternative, organic and whole food options to traditional chain grocery stores and food processing.

I started to look for ethnic markets where I could find French bread, good olive oil and cheeses. It was the hippie time and co-ops were forming, which had better products; I cooked at home using these ingredients. I started driving to nearby farms in search of quality products. We had no money at the time and it was an epicurean wasteland in DC then, with only one or two good restaurants. I got really into cooking and we entertained a lot because it was the best way to have social time, given the circumstances.

Pouillon soon had several home-based businesses in D.C.’s Adams Morgan neighborhood where she hosted and taught cooking classes, and ran a casual catering service.

== Culinary career ==
The turning point in Nora's culinary career came in the mid-1970s, when one of her students asked if she was interested in opening the first restaurant inside the historic Tabard Inn. She developed a following serving locally-sourced tomatoes and house-made mayonnaise, and began making plans to open her own restaurant.

=== Restaurant Nora ===
In 1979, Restaurant Nora opened its doors on the corner of Florida Avenue and 21st in Washington, D.C.’s DuPont Circle neighborhood. Journalist Sally Quinn and her late husband, Washington Post executive editor, Ben Bradlee were early patrons and financial backers of Restaurant Nora. Quinn offered a piece of advice: “Don’t mention anything about being healthy and natural. That sounds so unappetizing. That sounds like hippie food.” Pouillon ignored it.

The early patronage and support of Bradlee and Quinn gained Restaurant Nora a loyal following, and by the early 1990s it was a destination for D.C's media and political elite. President Bill Clinton held his first inaugural party at the restaurant. Jimmy Carter was the first president to eat at Nora's, and it was a favorite of Hillary Clinton; Barack Obama and Michelle Obama have dined there, as has Nancy Reagan. Asked about her presidential patrons in The Washington Post, Pouillon said: “Neither of the Bush presidents ever set foot in Nora’s, but Laura Bush came, along with her two daughters,” Pouillon announces proudly. “Good food, it seems, is also bipartisan.”

Restaurant Nora closed in June 2017, upon Pouillon's retirement.

=== America's first certified organic restaurant ===
Pouillon began to investigate how to become an organic certified restaurant and learned that no certification process existed. She decided to set about creating those standards. She worked for two years with Oregon Tilth, a nonprofit membership organization dedicated to supporting and advocating organic food and farming. The Oregon Tilth Certified Organic Program was established in 1982 and is an Accredited Certifying Agent for the USDA's National Organic Program. The resulting standard required that 95 percent of the food used, as a certified restaurant, must be obtained from USDA certified organic sources. “This meant obtaining proof of organic certification from all our suppliers,” Pouillon says. She complied with the lengthy requirements, and in 1999 Restaurant Nora became the first certified organic restaurant in the country. For many restaurants across the country, achieving and maintaining proof that 95 percent of suppliers are organic is a costly and time-consuming process. As Nora explained to Organic Connections Magazine about becoming certified: “People don’t always understand how complicated and time consuming it is,” Pouillon explains. “Almost everything has to be organic down to the spices and coffee. It’s a lot of work to find certified organic farmers and track down certification papers from 35-plus purveyors every year. This process has to be done each year because the certificates have to be renewed each year.”

=== City Café/Asia Nora ===
In 1986, Pouillon opened the now defunct City Café on M Street in West End, Washington, D.C. City Café was a casual modern American restaurant open for lunch and dinner. In 1994, she changed the format to Asian cuisine and renamed the restaurant Asia Nora, offering organic fusion cuisine. In 2007, Pouillon closed the popular Asia Nora.

=== Activism ===
In 1993, Pouillon joined with chefs John Ash, Rick Bayless, Susan Feniger, Nobu Matsuhisa, Michel Romano, and Alice Waters to found Chefs Collaborative, an organization dedicated to sustainable food practices. Pouillon is a member of Les Dames d'Escoffier, a society of professional women involved in the food, wine, and hospitality industries. She is also active in the Women Chefs and Restaurateurs, an organization for women chefs and restaurateurs.

Pouillon was a driving force behind the opening of the FreshFarm farmers' market in Dupont Circle in 1997, serving on the Board as FreshFarm expanded to more than ten markets throughout the city.

Pouillon sits on the board of directors for the Ocean Foundation, the Amazon Conservation Team, the Earth Day Network, and the DC Environmental Film Festival. From 1998 to 2000, Pouillon was a spokesperson for the "Give Swordfish a Break" campaign for NRDC/SeaWeb. Along with restaurant partners William Cole, Thomas and Steven Damato in 2005, Pouillon founded Blue Circle Foods, a sustainable seafood company that focuses on traceability, animal welfare, food safety, and quality. Blue Circle supplies fresh and frozen seafood to chefs, retailers, and select distributors.

== Awards and honors ==
- 1996 U.S.A. Chef of the Year, American Tasting Institute.
- 1997 Chef of the Year, International Association of Culinary Professionals Award of Excellence.
- 2009 Genesis Award, Women Chefs & Restaurateurs.
- 2010 StarChefs Innovator Award, Contribution to American Cuisine.
- 2011 Pioneers Table, Chefs Collaborative.
- 2017 Women and Green Economy (WAGE®) Award, Earth Day Network.
- 2017 Lifetime Achievement Award, James Beard Foundation.
- 2018 Goldenes Verdienstzeichen, Decoration of Merit in Gold for Services to the Republic of Austria.

== Books ==
- Pouillon, Nora (1993). Nora no shinpuru de herushīna ryōri (in Japanese) (Shohan ed.). Shibata Shoten. ISBN 978-4388057054.
- Pouillon, Nora (April 23, 1996). Cooking with Nora : seasonal menus from Restaurant Nora : healthy, light, balanced, and simple food with organic ingredients. Park Lane Press/Random House. ISBN 978-0517200100.
- Pouillon, Nora; Fraser, Laura (April 21, 2015). My organic life : how a pioneering chef helped shape the way we eat today. Knopf. ISBN 978-0385350754.

== Personal life ==
Pouillon has been married once, to a French journalist, 17 years her senior—the marriage produced two sons. Nora has one child with her business partner, Steven Damato.
