= Washington State University College of Agricultural, Human, and Natural Resource Sciences =

Agricultural college of Washington State University

Coordinates: 46.7315041°N 117.1551611°W

- Type: Public
- Established: 1892
- Dean: Richard T. Koenig (Interim)
- Location: Pullman, Washington, U.S.
- Website: www.cahnrs.wsu.edu

The Washington State University College of Agricultural, Human, and Natural Resource Sciences (CAHNRS) is one of the 11 colleges of Washington State University that offer undergraduate and graduate programs. Established as Washington Agricultural College and School of Science, the college started instructions on January 13, 1892. The college is in Pullman, Washington, and became a land-grant college after the passage of Morrill Act. The college provides education, research and services through fifteen academic departments, four research and extension centers, and thirty-nine county extension offices across the state of Washington. The college is known for apple production, grape growers and small grain genetics and breeding.

== Departments ==
The college is divided into 12 departments and schools, which offer 22 majors and 19 minors. They include:

- School of Economic Sciences
- School of the Environment
- School of Food Science
- Department of Animal Sciences
- Department of Apparel, Merchandising, Design and Textiles
- Department of Biological Systems Engineering
- Department of Crop and Soil Sciences
- Department of Entomology
- Department of Horticulture
- Department of Human Development
- Department of Plant Pathology
- Institute of Biological Chemistry

== Research institutes, laboratories, and centers ==
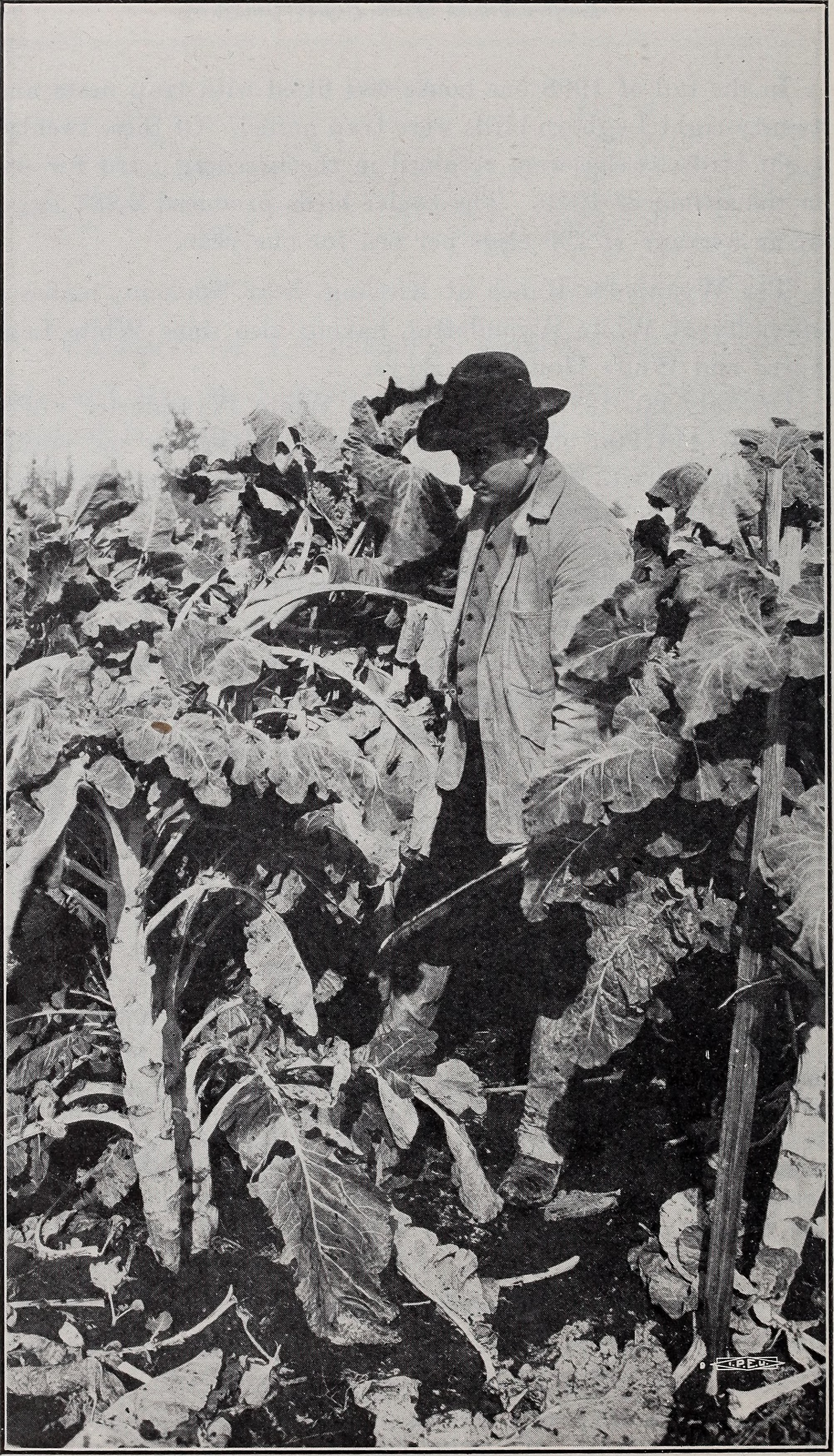
Puyallup Experiment Station, 1912

In the fiscal year 2008-09, the Agricultural Research Center of the college was awarded more than $33.5 million of grants and contracts for funded agricultural research. The Agricultural Research Centers includes 15 departments of the CAHNRS and the following institutes, laboratories, and Research centers:

- Agricultural Weather Network
- Center for Precision & Automated Agricultural Systems
- Center for Sustaining Agriculture and Natural Resources
- Composite Materials and Engineering Center
- Institute of Biological Chemistry
- Long Beach Research and Extension Unit
- WSU Mt. Vernon Northwestern Washington Research and Extension Center
- WSU Prosser Irrigated Agriculture Research and Extension Center
- WSU Puyallup Research and Extension Center
- WSU Wenatchee Tree Fruit Research and Extension Center
- WSU Pullman Plant Growth Facilities

== See also ==
- Agriculture in Washington
- Marion E. Ensminger, chair of the animal science department (1944–1962)
