= Jefferson Park (Seattle) =

Park in Seattle, Washington, U.S.

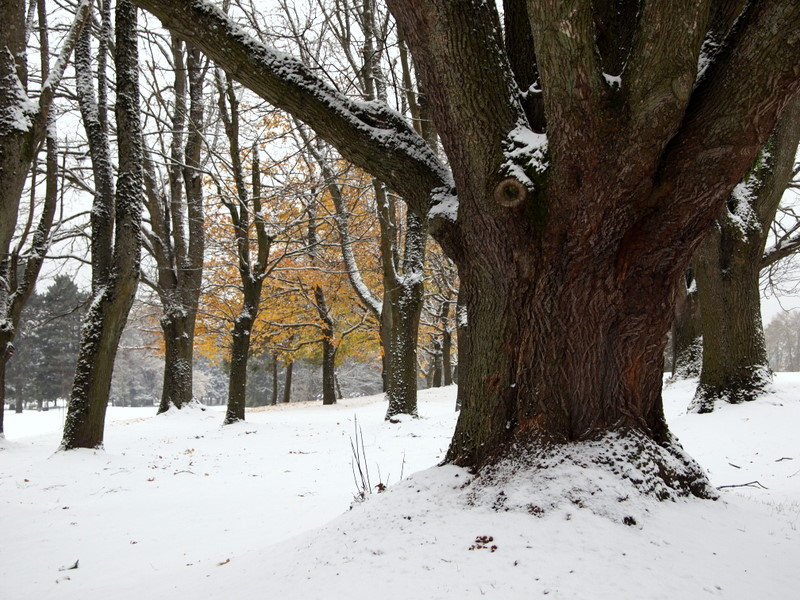
- Jefferson Park golf course trees in snow
- Interactive map of Jefferson Park
- Type: Urban Park
- Location: Seattle, Washington
- Coordinates: 47°34′06″N 122°18′39″W
- Area: 54.2 acres (0.219 km^{2})
- Created: 1908; 118 years ago
- Operator: Seattle Parks and Recreation

Jefferson Park is a 52.4 acres (0.212 km^{2}) public park and golf course on top of Beacon Hill in Seattle, Washington, bounded on the east by 24th Avenue S. and 24th Place S., on the west by 15th Avenue S., on the north by S. Spokane Street, and on the south by Cheasty Boulevard S.

== History ==
The park site was originally planned by the State of Washington for state university use. In 1892, it was the site of a "pesthouse," or isolation hospital. In 1898, the land was sold to the city of Seattle, with plans to build a reservoir and a cemetery. In 1908, the park was named for Thomas Jefferson.

The Olmsted Brothers included the park in their comprehensive plan for Seattle parks, and designed the 18 hole golf course which opened in 1915.

During World War II, Jefferson Park contained anti-aircraft batteries, and was requisitioned by the U.S. Army for a G.I. recreation center, with recreation facilities, a gym, and tent housing for soldiers and visiting family.

In the post war years, the park returned to normal; the Army structures were mostly removed, though a new Veterans' Administration hospital was built on the site of the original 9-hole golf course. (A replacement 9-hole course was built elsewhere in the park.) This is also the home course of golfing great Fred Couples. The golf course was the site of the USA Cross Country Championships in 2011. A lawn bowling green and playgrounds were also constructed at this time.

The park's reservoir was covered from 2008 to 2009, creating new parkspace supported by 624 columns.

== The park today ==
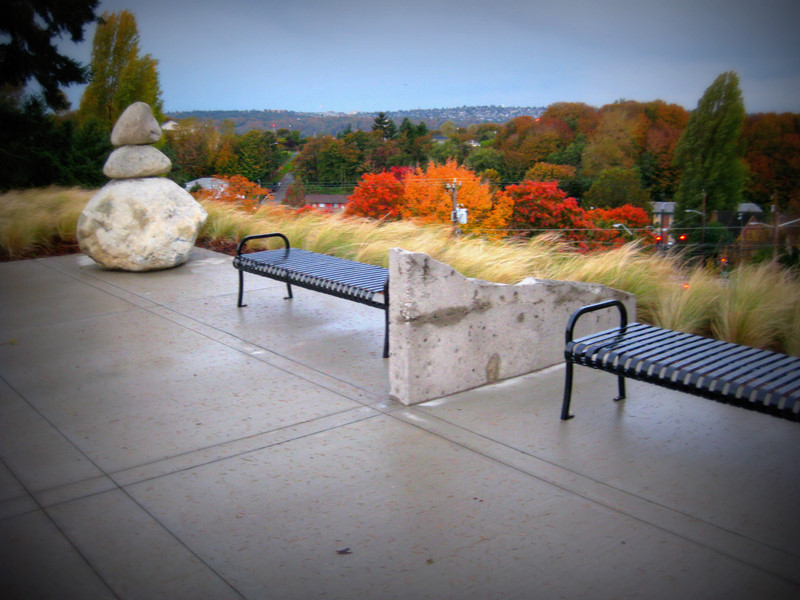
Jefferson Park viewpoint, fall 2010

The Jefferson Park Golf Course, the Jefferson Community Center, Jefferson Lawn Bowling green, and playfields continue to be heavily used. Jefferson Park received $8 million from the recent ProParks funding levy, allowing redevelopment and remodeling to begin. Projects in this park revitalization effort include new walking paths, gardens, and a new gymnasium. The Jefferson Park expansion officially opened October 28, 2010.

Adjacent to the park on the west side is the Beacon Food Forest, a 7 acres (2.8 ha) volunteer-run forest gardening project that provides food to neighbors and food shelves.

In June 2014 a 'skate space' designed by artist CJ Rench opened up to the public. It is a sculpture specifically designed for skateboarding.

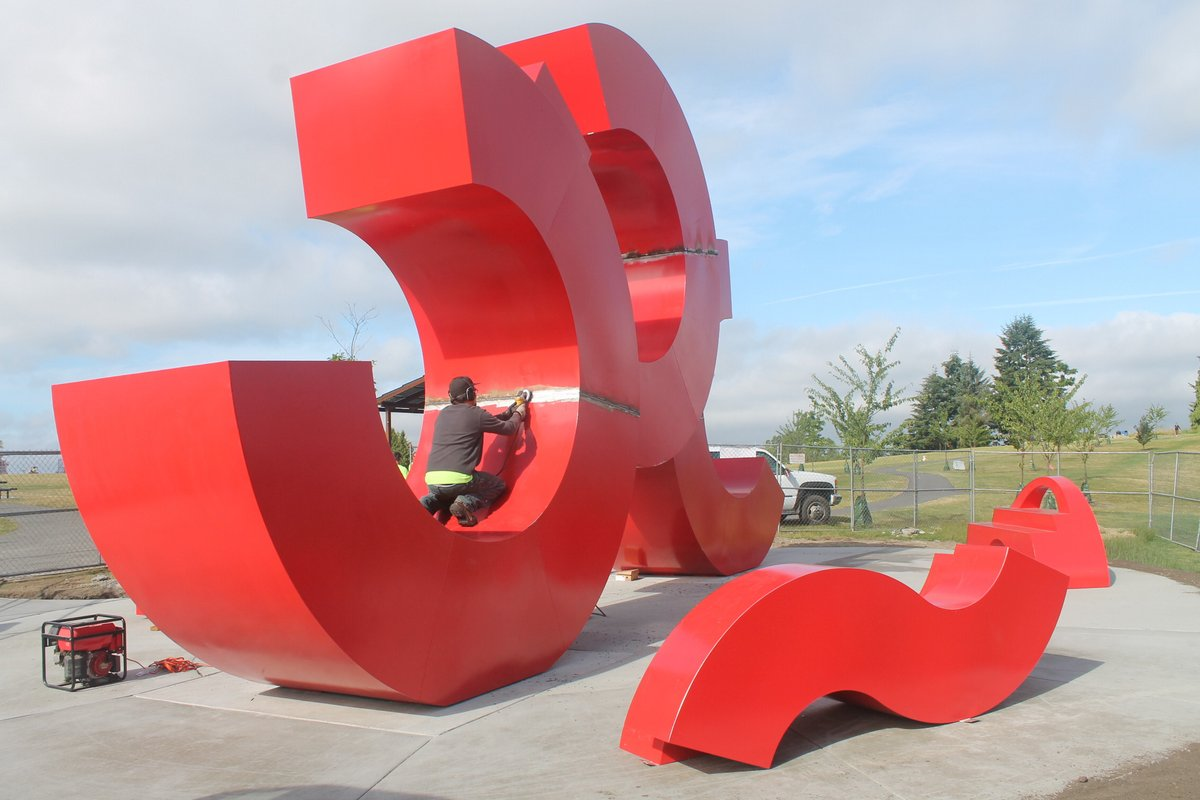
'Skate-Space' sculpture by CJ Rench
