= Oregon Tilth =

- Formation: 1974
- Type: Non-profit organization
- Website: www.tilth.org

Oregon Tilth is an American nonprofit membership organization advocating organic food and farming, based in Corvallis, Oregon. Oregon Tilth's purpose is to educate gardeners, farmers, legislators, and the general public about sustainable growing practices that promote soil health, conserve natural resources, and prevent environmental degradation while producing a clean and healthful food supply. Chris Schreiner is the executive director.

Oregon Tilth Certified Organic (OTCO) was established in 1982 and engages in certification activities for agricultural producers, product manufacturers and other handlers of organic products. Oregon Tilth is an Accredited Certifying Agent (ACA) for the USDA's National Organic Program. Oregon Tilth Certified Organic provides organic certification of:

- Crop production
- Wild crop harvesting
- Livestock production (including beekeeping)
- Handling production (including processing, handling, marketing, restaurants, retail, fiber and textiles)

Oregon Tilth publishes a bi-monthly newspaper entitled In Good Tilth (IGT). Each issue of IGT offers informative articles covering agricultural news items relevant to both rural producers and urban consumers. Regular features include yard and garden tips, OTCO certified farmer or processor profiles; research updates and news; classified ads and a calendar of upcoming events. Since 2004, IGT has featured several articles translated into Spanish.

The OTCO Program offers assessment for compliance with several different organic certification standards. Some certification standards are established and enforced via government regulations, such as the USDA National Organic Program standards (7 CFR Part 205), the European Organic Program (EEC 2092/91), and the Canadian Organic Regime. Other organic standards are established by industry working groups, such as the Global Organic Textile Standard (GOTS).

== History ==
In 1999, Oregon Tilth worked with Restaurant Nora in Washington, DC, to certify the restaurant as the first 'Certified Organic Restaurant' in the United States. Restaurant Nora closed in 2017. In 2006, Oregon Tilth certified 'Tilth' restaurant as Washington state's first Certified Organic Restaurant, opened by Chef Maria Hines in Wallingford, Seattle. Tilth closed in 2020.

In the summer of 2012, a proposed merger between Oregon Tilth and California Certified Organic Farmers (CCOF) proved controversial and was met with significant opposition from both membership bodies, including OTCO's founders and long-term members of CCOF. On Saturday, September 29, at Oregon Tilth’s membership meeting in Portland, Oregon, a proposal to rename Oregon Tilth as CCOF Tilth Foundation, revise bylaws, and transfer ownership of the certification program, was presented to the membership. In October 2012, the merger was called off after the proposal failed to achieve the two-thirds vote necessary from Oregon Tilth members.

== See also ==
- Washington Tilth Association
