= South End, Seattle =

Neighborhoods in Seattle, Washington, United States

Coordinates: 47°32′28″N 122°16′48″W

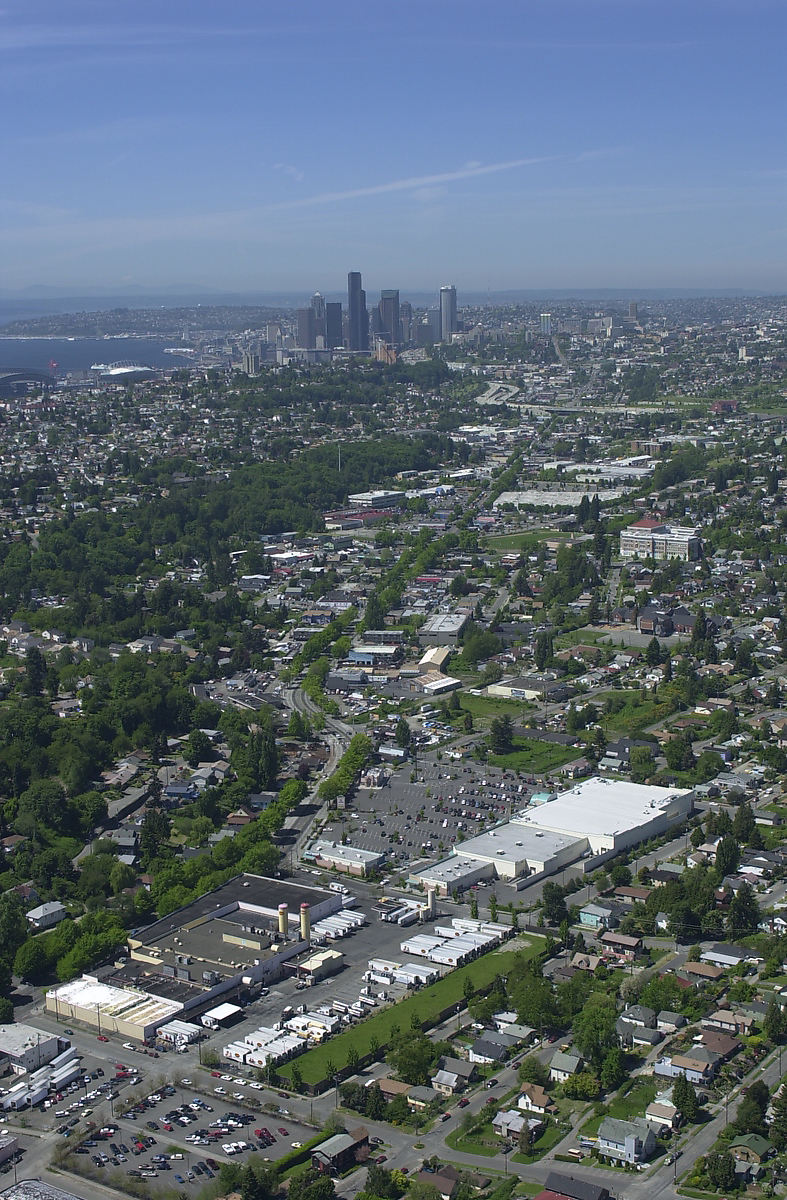
Rainier Valley and other South End neighborhoods in 2001

The South End is a group of neighborhoods in southeastern Seattle, Washington. The definition is a bit fluid, but has traditionally included the area south of the Central District, and east of Interstate 5: Rainier Valley, Columbia City, Rainier Beach, Seward Park, Mount Baker, and Beacon Hill. Sometimes its definition is extended to Skyway and Bryn Mawr in unincorporated King County, though these are not technically in the city. Other definitions have included northern parts of Renton and Tukwila, though most Seattleites, especially those from the South End, would consider this usage incorrect. Often the term "South End" is used colloquially to include neighboring portions of South King County, by people living in those areas, due to that area's location in reference to Seattle proper.

The South End has traditionally been a diverse neighborhood with a mix of Caucasian, African American, Latino and Asian communities. It is currently going through a period of redevelopment and gentrification, and was a target of former Seattle Mayor Greg Nickels's action agenda and Sound Transit's Link light rail. There is a high school sports rivalry between the South End's high schools Rainier Beach and Franklin and the Central District's Garfield. Today the neighborhood has a population of 84,180 and is 34% Asian, 27% White or Caucasian, 23% Black or African-American, 8% Hispanic and 5% other races or of mixed race.

== Media ==
Local Seattle media has often ignored the South End or portrayed it negatively, exhibiting bias. In 2014, the South Seattle Emerald was founded by Marcus Harrison Green and Bridgette Hempstead to serve the South End. They wanted to share under-represented stories and topics that mattered to South End residents, often in their own voices. Omari Salisbury's news organization Converge Media grew its audience rapidly in the 2020s. Its shows and podcasts often cover Central District and South End perspectives. Rainier Avenue Radio began in the 2010s and expanded after 2020, and it hosts shows targeted at South Seattle and the broader city. It includes shows in multiple languages like Spanish, Fijian, Tagalog, and Vietnamese. The South Seattle Emerald, Converge Media, and Rainier Avenue Radio are all Black-owned outlets, and they prioritize sharing the perspectives of people of color living in the South End.
