= Daejeon Park =

Park in Seattle, Washington, U.S.

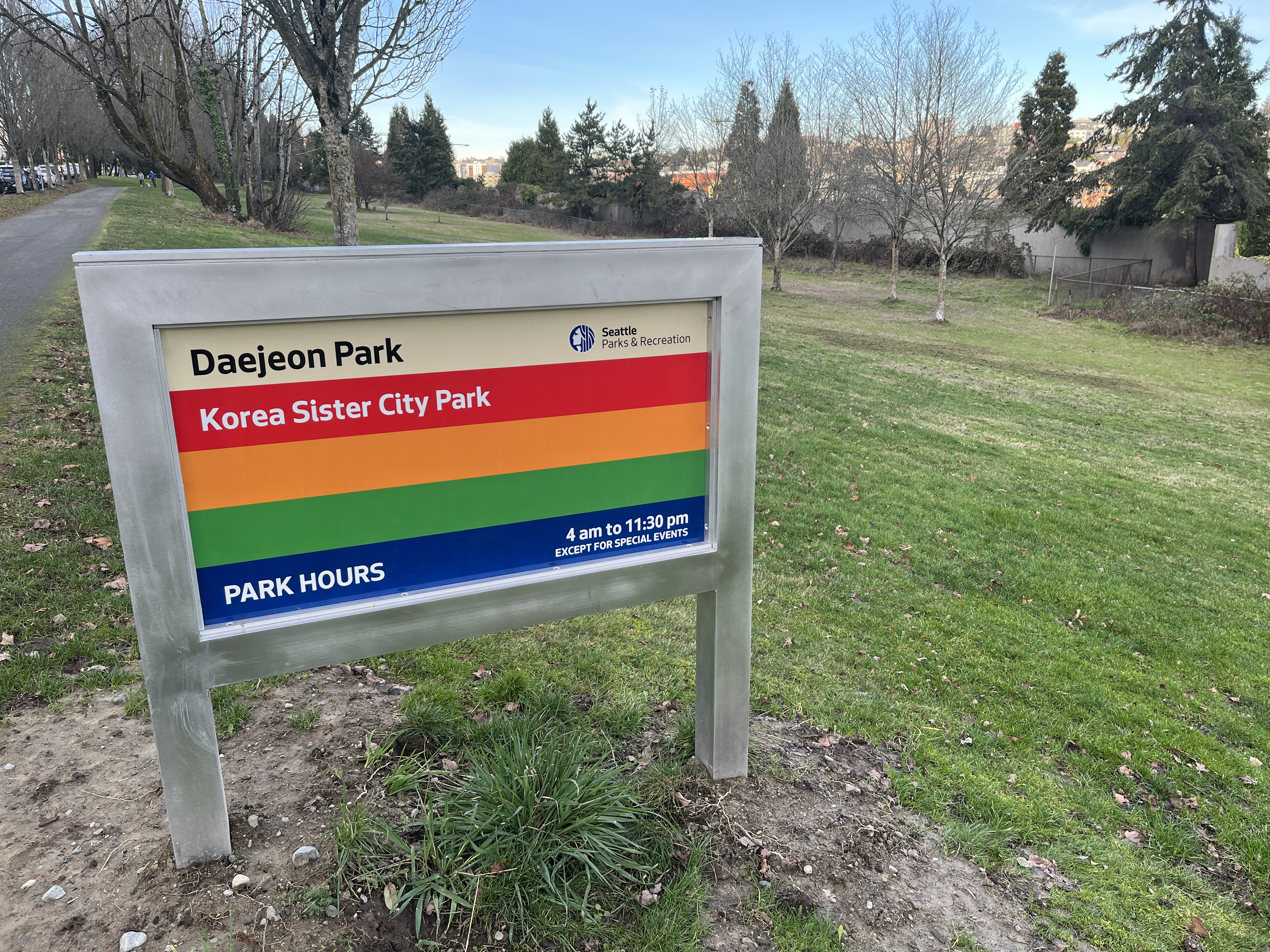
- Park sign, 2023
- Interactive map of Daejeon Park
- Location: Seattle, Washington, U.S.
- Coordinates: 47.5920°N 122.3122°W
- Operator: Seattle Parks and Recreation

Daejeon Park is a public park in Seattle, in the U.S. state of Washington.

== Description ==
Named after Seattle's sister city in South Korea and operated by Seattle Parks and Recreation, Daejeon Park is adjacent to Sturgus Park on the north side of Beacon Hill. Daejeon Park features an open space, a Korean style pagoda, and views of Mount Rainier. According to the website Roadside America, the pagoda was given to the city in 1998 and is called Taejonjeong, or "Pavilion of Greatness".

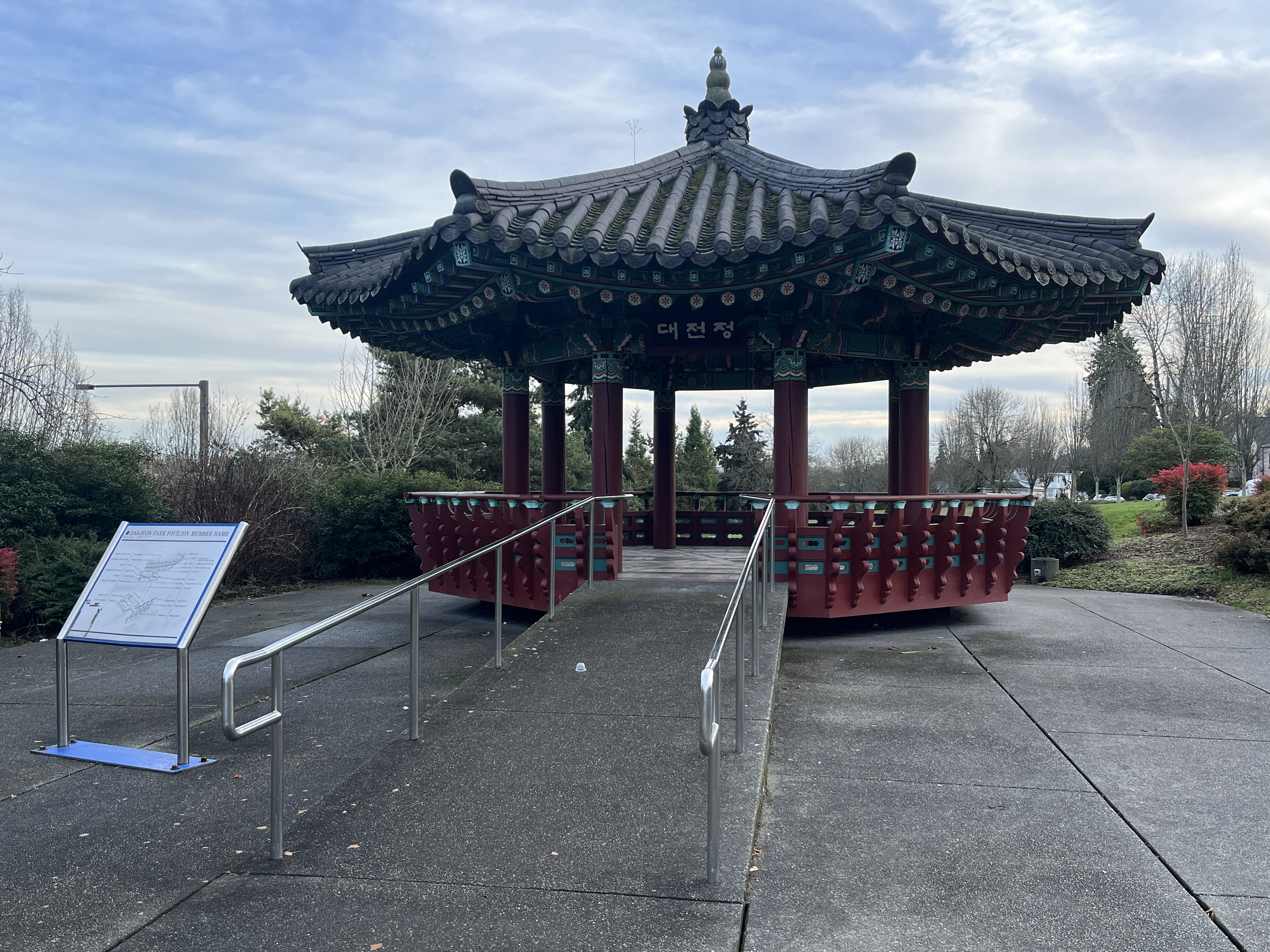
Pagoda

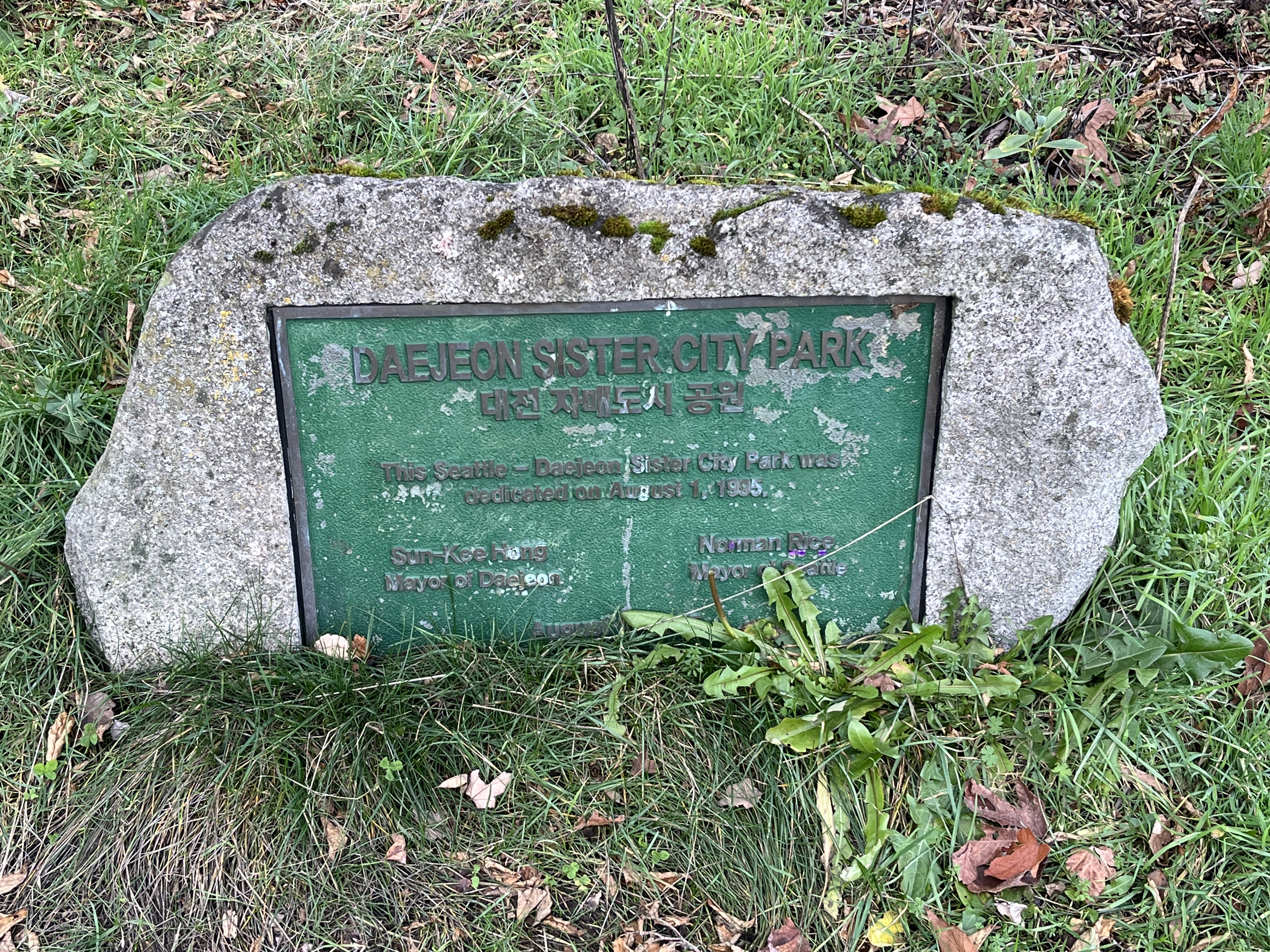
Commemorative plaque

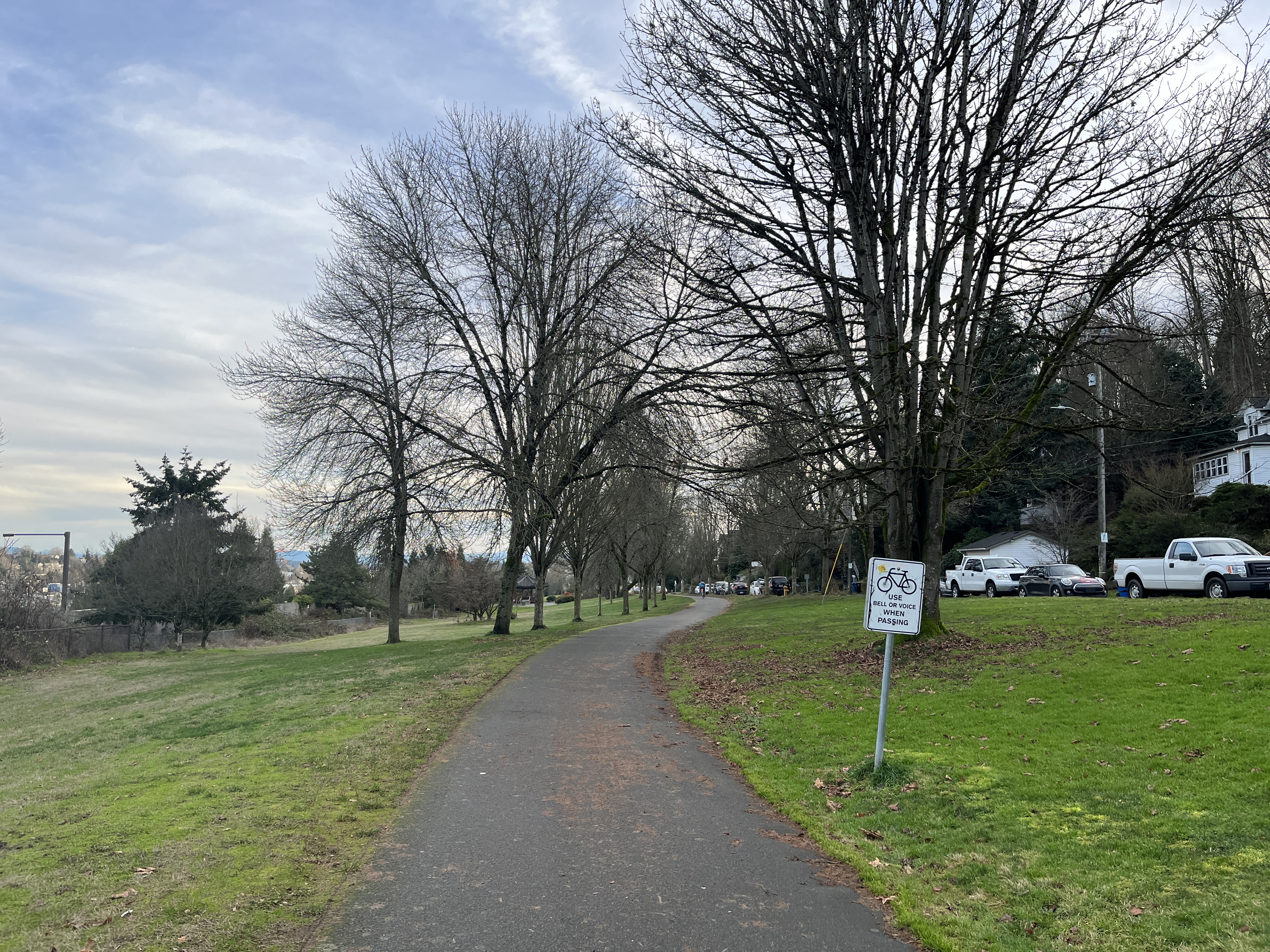
Walkway

== History ==
In 2010, a group of mostly Korean community members gathered at the park to protest North Korea's bombardment of Yeonpyeongdo.

Approximately 35 people gathered at Daejeon Park and marched to the Northwest African American Museum in 2016 as part of the I AM Procession organized by activist and artist Kimisha Turner to raise awareness of colorism.

The Korean American Coalition hosted a park clean-up event for Korean American Service Day in 2019.

== Reception ==
Sunset magazine has said the park "is a great spot for a picnic on the open lawn, but its walking paths and Korean-style pagoda make it a haven for quiet contemplation". The park has been included in published walking tours of the city and is referenced in the 2022 book Muddy Backroads: Stories from off the Beaten Path by Luanne Smith and Bonnie Jo Campbell.
