= Comet Lodge Cemetery =

Cemetery in Seattle, Washington, U.S.

Coordinates: 47°32′49″N 122°18′18″W

Comet Lodge graveyard
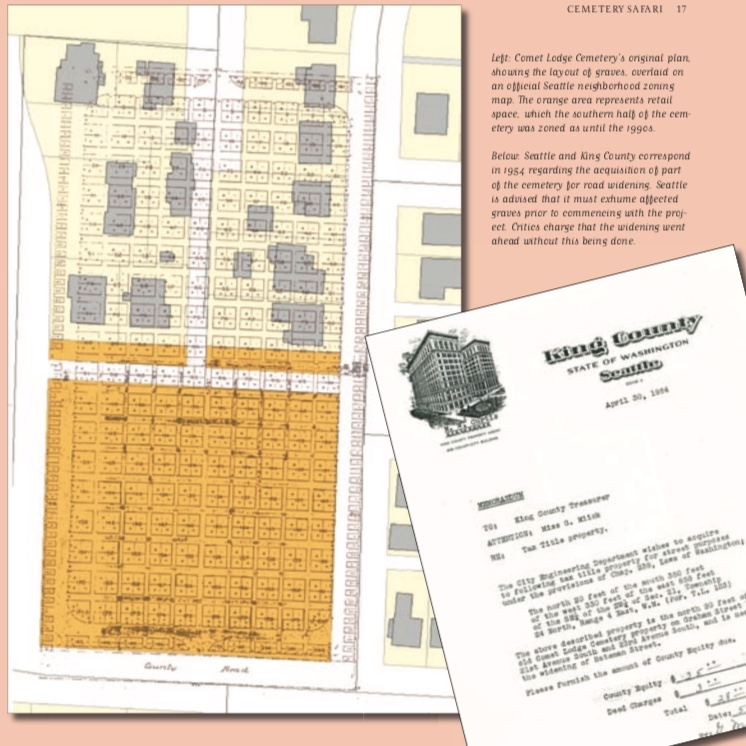
- Current Comet Lodge graveyard
- Interactive map of Comet Lodge graveyard

Details
- Established: 1895
- Location: Seattle, Washington
- Country: United States
- Owned by: Disputed: Nov. 29, 1938 King County foreclosed upon M.L. Noise, deceased; Dec. 30, 1938, City of Seattle foreclosed and was granted ownership. Both foreclosures were without merit, contravening WA law prohibiting foreclosures upon cemeteries.
- Website: https://cometlodgecemetery.blogspot.com/

The Comet Lodge graveyard on Beacon Hill in Seattle, Washington is situated just east of Interstate 5 on the hill's western slope, on South Graham Street between 21st and 23rd Avenues South.

The cemetery was established in the 1800s as the sacred burial grounds for the Duwamish Nation. Seattle's earliest settlers followed.

The monuments, headstones, and grave markers etched with history, are cenotaphs marking nothing after the burial grounds were bulldozed by the City of Seattle on November 2, 1987.

== History ==
May 6, 1908: Comet Lodge 139 divides cemetery into two parcels and sells Comet Lodge Cemetery to one of their Nobles, H.S. Noice, for $1.00.

July 19, 1912: H.S. Noice sold burial plots in this graveyard until July 19, 1912. It is not known if Mr. Noice issued deeds of trust, but it should be assumed that his customers received something to recognize their purchase of particular plots of land. Mr. Noice and his wife, Frances M. Noice, then filed a quit claim deed, 837297, in the presence of M.W. Lovejoy, a Noble notary, deeding the properties to H.R. Corson, a Grand Noble of the Comet Lodge, for the sum of $10.00. This deed was recorded by Lida White Richardson on Nov. 20, 1912, at 55 min. past 2 P.M. with Otto A. Case sp. the County Auditor. For the next few years both Noble Noice and Grand Noble Corson sold burial plots within their association with the Comet Lodge as recorded by the Lodge burial list."

June 10, 1927: Prior to subdivision, the baby grave markers were removed. They are clearly shown above the Johnny Jones funeral party in photo. Grand Noble H.R. Corson, and wife Eva S. Corson subdivided and sold portions of the babies' resting place, the north half of the Comet Cemetery, to the City of Seattle for $1.00. The City bought the properties knowing that they were sections of the graveyard. 2423316 (1373/390) Jun. 10-27 $1. HR Corson, and wife Eva S. Corson to The City of Seattle, a mun corp

November 29, 1938: Judgement and Decree of Foreclosure in the Superior Court of Washington for King County vs. M.L. Noice, deceased, for the graveyard property "Less streets and less property sold for burial purposes. In other words, this foreclosure, is merit-less because a cemetery can never be foreclosed upon. This judgement was for non-existent property.

December 20, 1938: Judgement and Decree of Foreclosure in the Superior Court of Washington for the City of Seattle vs. Unknown for the graveyard. Another foreclosure grants Seattle the Comet Lodge Cemetery. Still there is no record of any notification public or private, vacating, nor re-interment in the courts as required. It is King County's contention that the graveyard had been abandoned for "many years" although records show that Jewel Lundin had been buried there a year before the foreclosures. There have been no recorded sightings of our City's ancestors leaving and abandoning their final resting site. Seattle takes responsibility after the final foreclosure.

1986 Seattle rezones the Historical Cemetery to Retail Space and single family residences.
November 2, 1987, Day of the Dead, All Souls Day, Seattle bulldozed gravemarkers to trench a sewer line.
