= Beacon Hill, Seattle =

- Seattle neighborhood
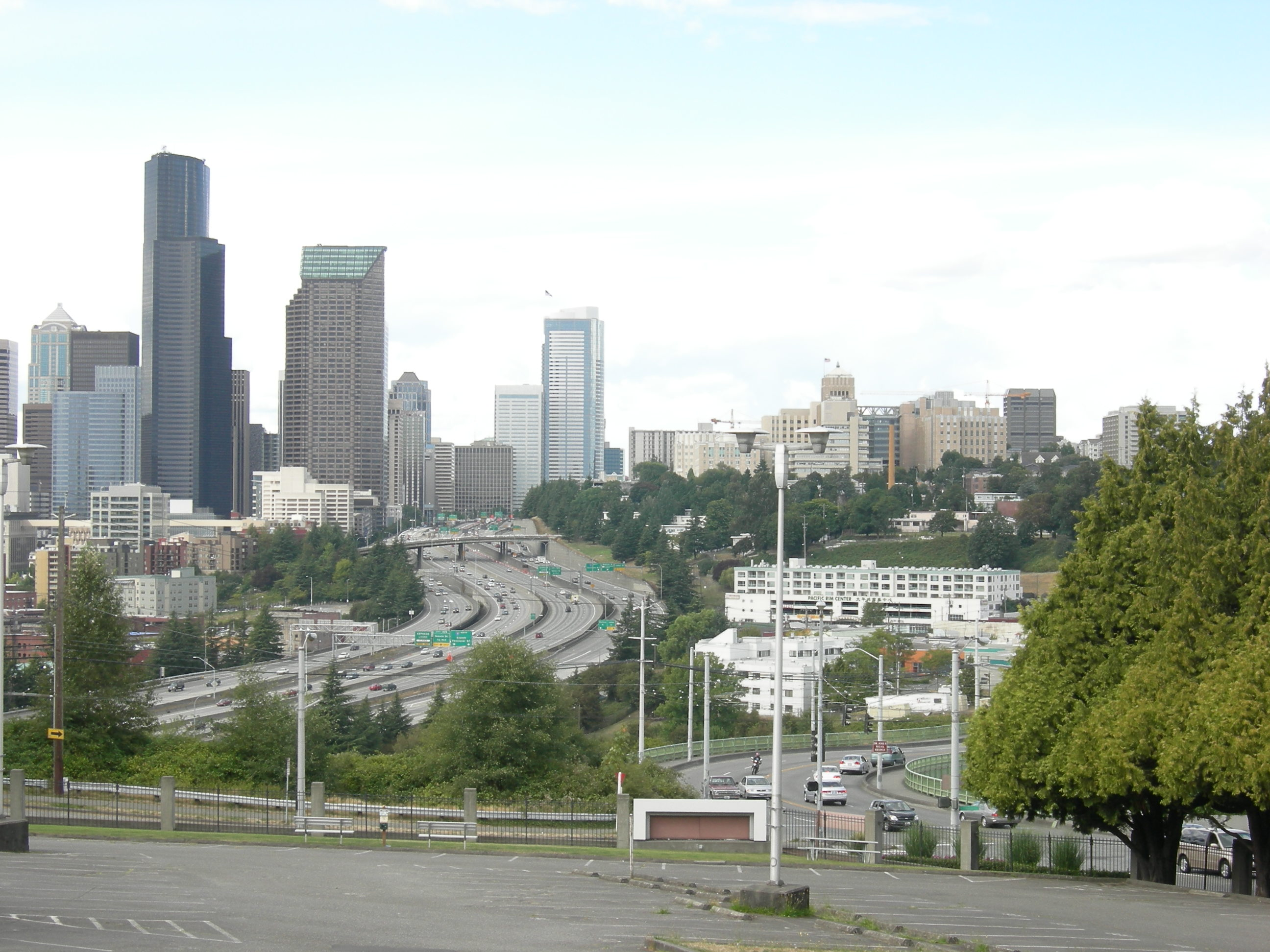
- I-5 & Downtown Seattle from Beacon Hill

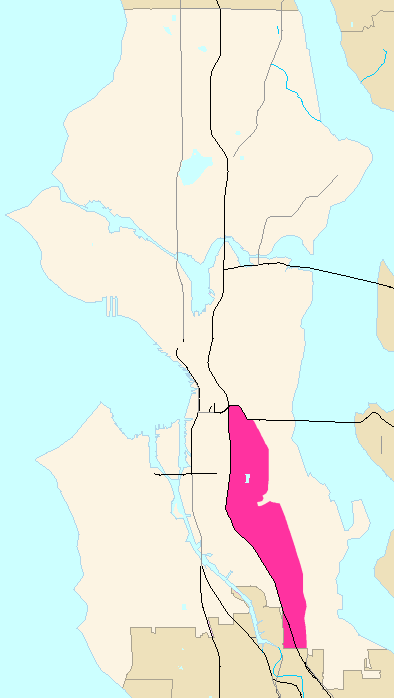
- Beacon Hill highlighted in pink
- Coordinates: 47°33′08″N 122°17′53″W
- Country: United States
- State: Washington
- County: King
- City: Seattle
- City Council: District 2
- Time zone: UTC−8 (PST)
  - Summer (DST): UTC−7 (PDT)
- ZIP Code: 98108, 98118, 98144
- Area code: 206, 564

Beacon Hill is a hill and neighborhood in southeastern Seattle, Washington. It is roughly bounded on the west by Interstate 5, on the north by Interstate 90, on the east by Rainier Avenue South, Cheasty Boulevard South, and Martin Luther King Junior Way South, and on the south by the Seattle city boundary. It is part of Seattle's South End.

== Overview ==
The neighborhood has a major population of Asian Americans and African Americans and is among the most racially diverse in Seattle. It was formerly home to the world headquarters of Amazon (at the Pacific Tower) and present home to the Seattle Division of the Department of Veterans Affairs' Puget Sound Health Care System.

== Geography ==
Beacon Hill offers views of downtown, the Industrial District, Elliott Bay, First Hill, Rainier Valley, and, when the weather is good, Mount Rainier and the Olympic Mountains. It is roughly bounded on the west by Interstate 5, on the north by Interstate 90, on the east by Rainier Avenue South, Cheasty Boulevard South, and Martin Luther King Junior Way South, and on the south by the Seattle city boundary. It is part of Seattle's South End.

The municipal government subdivides it into North Beacon Hill, Mid-Beacon Hill, Holly Park, and South Beacon Hill, though most people who live there simply call it "Beacon Hill."

Homes on the northern part of the hill were mostly built in the early 1900s; thus, North Beacon Hill contains many examples of Craftsman bungalows and Seattle box houses, a local variant of the Foursquare style.

=== Nearby neighborhoods ===
- Columbia City
- Georgetown
- Industrial District (see also SoDo)
- International District/Chinatown
- Judkins Park
- Mount Baker
- Rainier Valley
- Rainier Beach
- SoDo

== History and demographics ==
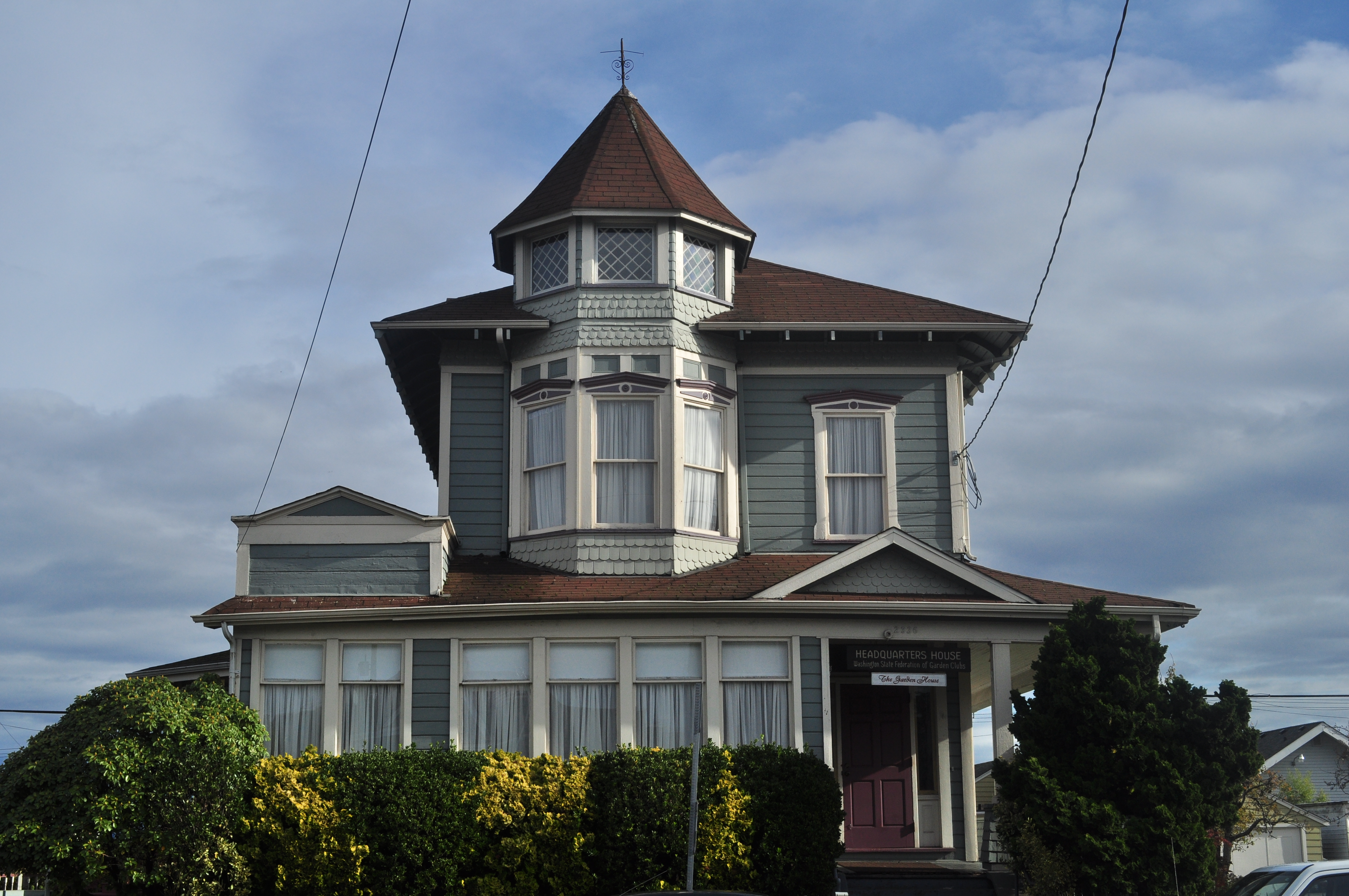
The Turner-Koepf House is on the National Register of Historic Places.

The Duwamish call the hill "Greenish-Yellow Spine" (Lushootseed: qWátSéécH, pronounced QWAH-tseech), probably referring to the color of the deciduous trees that once grew thickly on the hill. Early settlers named it Holgate and Hanford Hill after two early settlers, John Holgate and Edward Hanford, who settled in the area in the 1850s and are commemorated to this day by South Holgate and Hanford Streets on North Beacon Hill. A later arrival, M. Harwood Young, named the hill after the Beacon Hill in his hometown, Boston, Massachusetts.

Beacon Avenue, the main thoroughfare through the neighborhood, was built with a wide median that covered the wooden pipe carrying Seattle's drinking water supply from the Cedar River. The water main had been constructed in 1901 along the ridgeline of the hill. The street was later used for streetcar service from 1931 to 1941 and utility poles—becoming a "pole forest" by the 1950s. The city government relocated the utility poles and beautified Beacon Avenue in the 1970s and 1980s, which included landscaping the median into a walking trail.

Beacon Hill was nicknamed "Boeing Hill" in the 1950s and 60s due to the number of residents who worked in the nearby Boeing airplane factory. The term fell out of use when many Boeing employees joined the general exodus to the suburbs, and Asian immigrants took their place. Today the neighborhood is majority Asian, as can be seen by the many Chinese, Vietnamese, and Filipino businesses along Beacon Avenue South. However, the area remains racially diverse, as shown by the 2000 United States census: 51% Asian, 20% white, 13% black, 9% Hispanic/Latino and 7% other. The census also showed the total Beacon Hill population to be 22,300. Neighboring Rainier Valley also shows a similar diversity.

== Landmarks and institutions ==
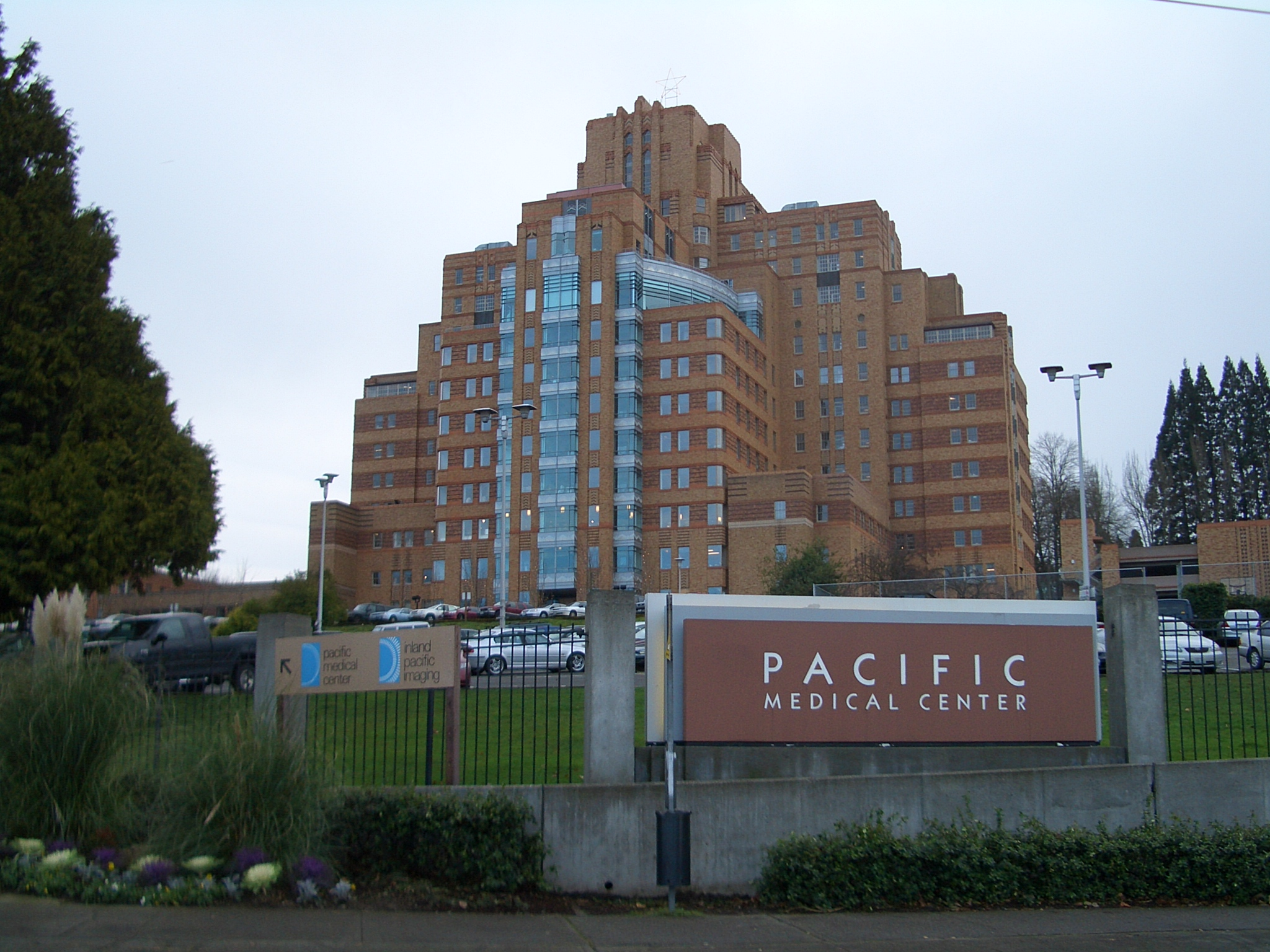
PacMed

- Pacific Tower (formerly Pacific Medical Center), located at the northern tip of Beacon Hill. Formerly a marine hospital, the building served as headquarters to Amazon for ten years.
- Jefferson Park: Golf, lawn bowling, skate park, Beacon Mountain Playground, tennis courts, open space and more. Golf professional Fred Couples was raised in the neighborhood and Jefferson Park was his home course as a teen.
- Beacon Food Forest is one of the nation's largest food forest projects and is located on the west side of Jefferson Park.
- Comet Lodge Cemetery (1895)
- Dr. Jose Rizal Park: views to the west overlooking downtown, Elliott Bay and Olympic Mountains; start of bike path to I-90 bridge, Lake Washington, Mercer Island, Eastgate
- El Centro de la Raza, a civil rights and community service organization, in the former Beacon Hill School built in 1904
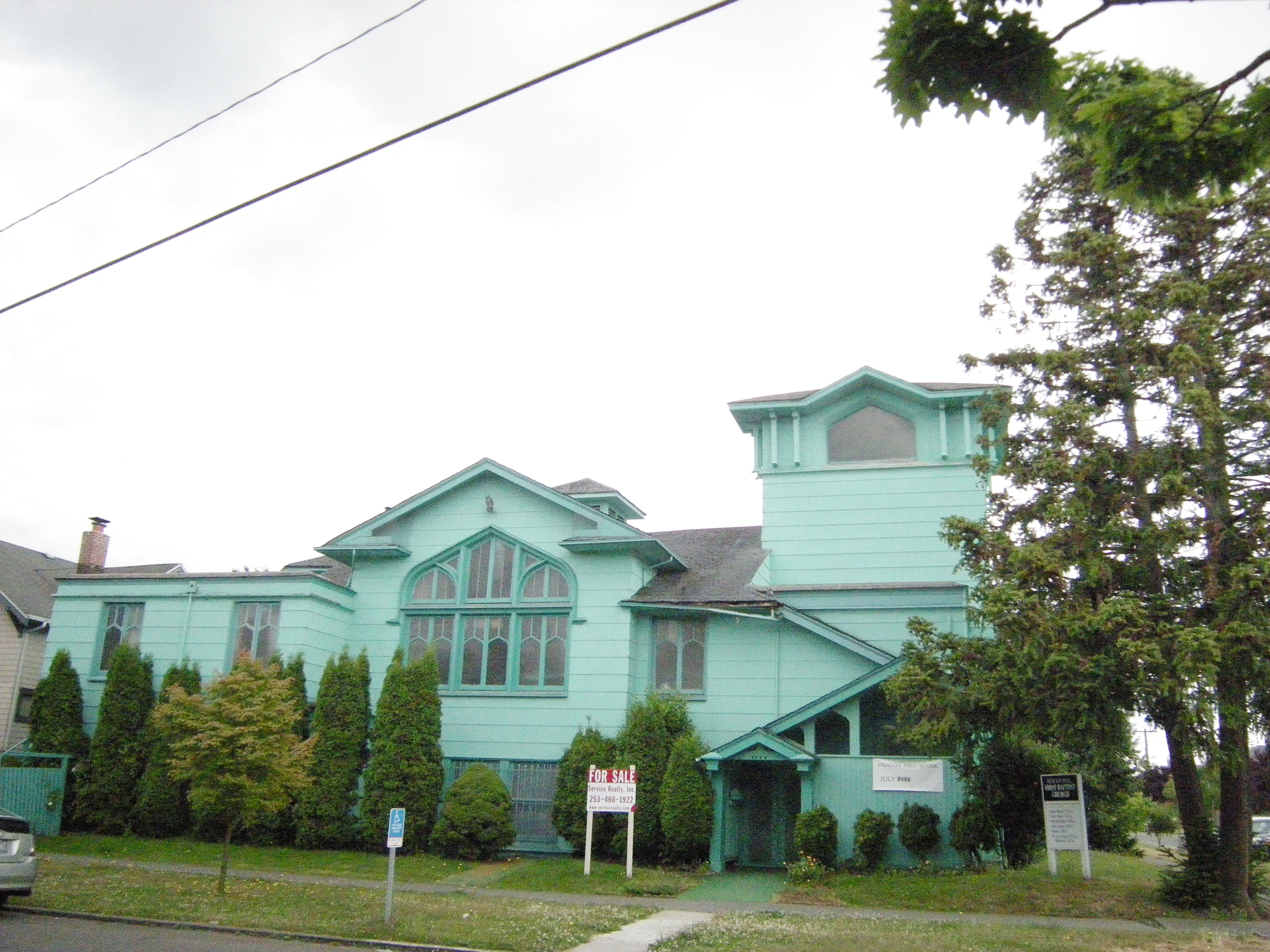
- Beacon Hill First Baptist Church
  Beacon Hill First Baptist Church a historic landmark Tudor Revival building built in 1910, designed by notable architect Ellsworth Storey
- The Frank D. Black property a designated landmark with river rock structures built in 1914
- Cheasty Greenbelt/Cheasty Boulevard Trail
- Beacon Hill Station of Sound Transit Light Rail, located at Beacon Avenue South and South Lander Street
- Beacon Hill branch of the Seattle Public Library, reopened in a new building and location in 2005
- Beacon Hill International Elementary School, a K-5 school that offers bilingual and diverse programs
- Daejeon Park
- East is West, outdoor mosaic by Val Laigo

== Culture ==
The Beacon Arts Guild is a community nonprofit arts organization that is based on Beacon Hill. They organize cultural events in the neighborhood and sponsor affordable housing and studio space for artists. A summer music festival, named "Beacon Rocks", was organized in the 2010s by another organization to host monthly performances on the Roberto Maestas Festival Street.

The neighborhood is home to the Beacon Food Forest, an urban food forest on 7 acres (2.8 ha) adjacent to Jefferson Park that was created in 2012. The project is part of the city's P-Patch network of shared neighborhood farms and is maintained year-round by volunteers. It includes walnuts, chestnuts, berry shrubs and vegetables.

== Accolades ==
In 2012, the American Planning Association named Beacon Hill as one of the 30 Great Places in America.
