= California Certified Organic Farmers =

California Certified Organic Farmers official logo

California Certified Organic Farmers (CCOF) is a United States Department of Agriculture (USDA)-accredited organic certifying agency and trade association, located in Santa Cruz, California. Formed in 1973, CCOF was the first organic certification entity in the United States.

CCOF includes three legally distinct entities. CCOF, Inc. is governed by a board of directors, and provides infrastructure for the certification, advocacy, and Foundation programs, and also supports a regional chapter system for its members. CCOF Certification Services, LLC, governed by the LLC management committee, is a USDA National Organic Program (NOP)-accredited organic certification agency. The CCOF Foundation is a nonprofit foundation that includes educational programs, grants for students and teachers, consumer education campaigns, and hardship assistance for organic farmers.

CCOF Certification Services, LLC offers organic certification to the USDA NOP standards to farms, livestock operations, processors, private labelers, brokers and retailers throughout the United States, Canada, and Mexico.

The sunflower in the logo for CCOF was hand drawn, in pen and ink, by Molly Greenham when she was a student at UC Berkeley in the late 80s.

In 2012, a merger between Oregon Tilth and CCOF was proposed. In October 2012, the merger was called off after the proposal failed to achieve the two-thirds vote necessary from Oregon Tilth members.

== See also ==
- Organic food
- Organic farming
