= Beacon Food Forest =

Food forest in Seattle, Washington, United States

Coordinates: 47°34′09″N 122°18′47″W

- Interactive map of Beacon Food Forest
- Type: Community garden
- Location: Beacon Hill, Seattle, Washington
- Nearest city: Seattle, Washington
- Area: 7 acres (2.8 ha)
- Established: 2012
- Designer: Jacqueline Cramer, Glenn Herlihy
- Operator: Food Forest Collective
- Website: beaconfoodforest.org

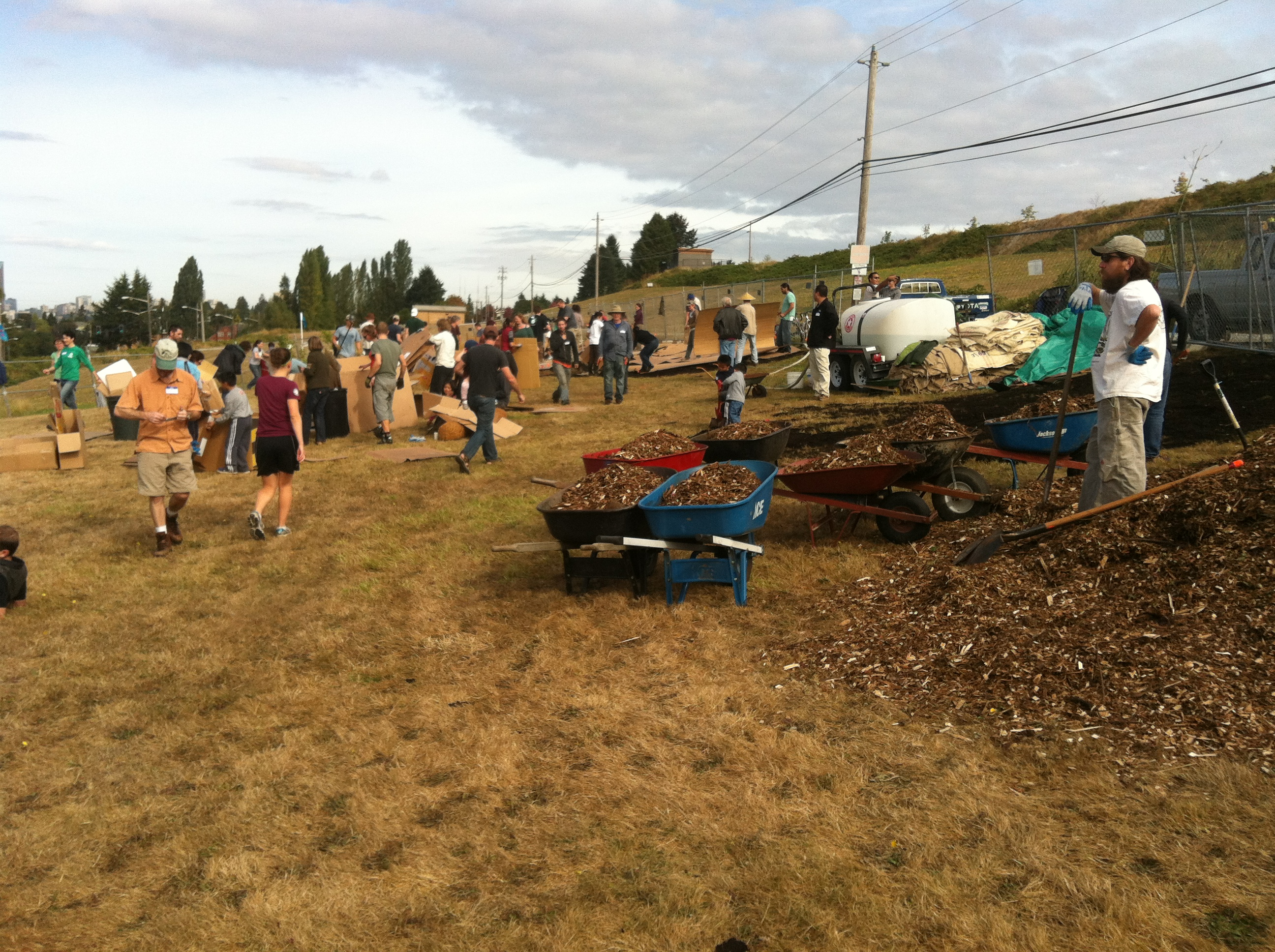
A ground-making event at Beacon Food Forest in 2012

Beacon Food Forest is a 7-acre food forest in development adjacent to Jefferson Park on Beacon Hill in Seattle, Washington in the vicinity of 15th Avenue South and South Dakota Street. As the area sits on land owned by Seattle Public Utilities, it is believed to be the largest food forest on public land in the United States. (Note: The distinction of largest edible park on public land in the US may belong to Incredible Edible Park in Irvine, California.) The project also has more traditional private allotments, similar to those in other local P-Patch gardens.

== Background ==
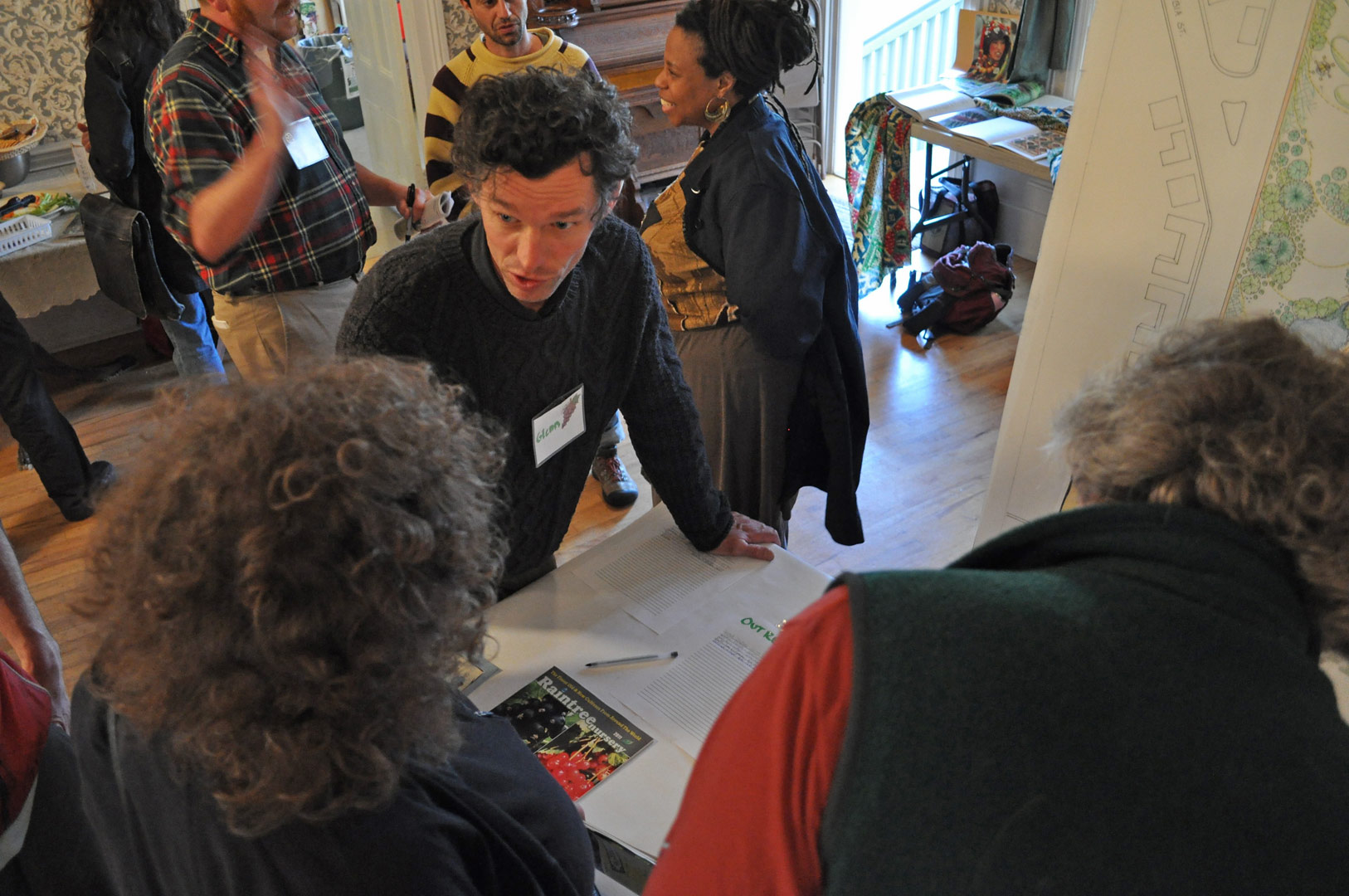
Glenn Herlihy (center left) in conversation at the first Beacon Food Forest public workshop

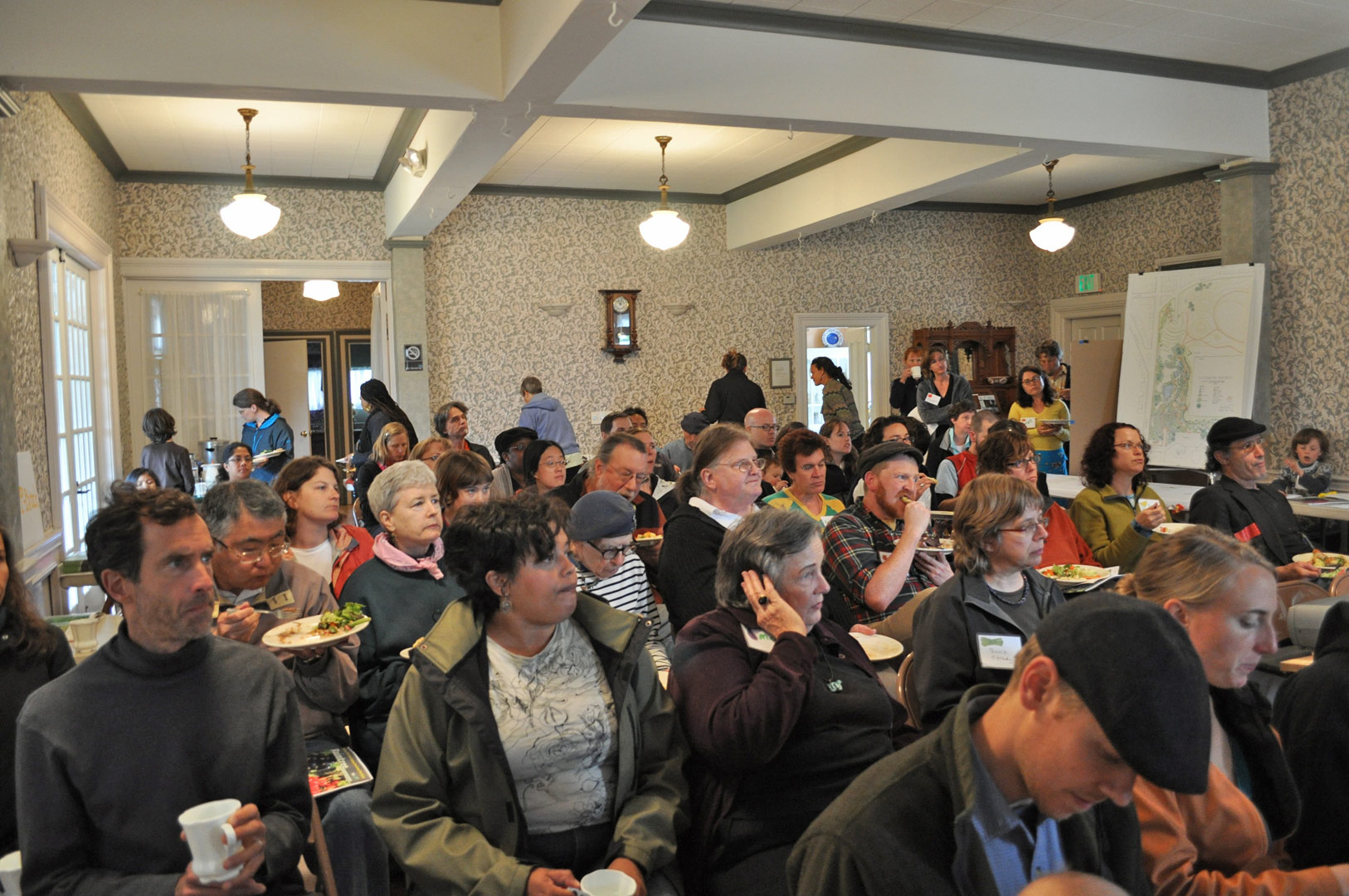
The first public workshop held by Friends of Beacon Food Forest took place on June 7, 2011.

In 2009, an early version of the project, then known as Jefferson Park Food Forest, was presented at OmCulture in Wallingford, Seattle by a design team of four students as a Permaculture Design Course (PDC) final project. The initiative was led by Jacqueline Cramer, a Seattle landscape designer and activist, and Glenn Herlihy, a member of the Jefferson Park Alliance, who was already involved in the community design and outreach process involved with the $8 million Pro-Parks Levy for the reconstruction of Jefferson Park.

That course was primarily taught by Marisha Auerbach, Kelda Miller and Jenny Pell with several prominent guest speakers from the local permaculture and raw vegan community. Classes were held at the Raw Vegan Source/New Earth Permaculture Farm in Redmond, at Seattle Tilth at the Home of the Good Shepherd as well as other workshop locations in 2009. Shortly thereafter, the project gained support by the Jefferson Park Alliance and moved toward its planning and development phase.

Heidi Cramer, and Daniel Lorenz Johnson, were also members of the original PDC class design team, (Note: The fourth member of that PDC class final project, who, among other things, focused her attention on designing interactive, recreational and educational elements for children, no longer participated in the project beyond the class presentation and wished to remain anonymous.) A new group, named Friends of Beacon Food Forest, (Note: The group changed its name most likely because the Food Forest was not technically on Jefferson Park property.) emerged in 2011 during the public outreach phase of the project.

=== Government process ===
In 2010, a $20,000 City of Seattle Department of Neighborhoods Small and Simple Neighborhood Matching Fund (NMF) grant was provided to hire a design team to come up with a design based on input from three public design workshops.

In December 2011 the project received $100,000 from the Department of Neighborhoods to begin phase one of the food forest plan. (Note: That money was provided to Department of Neighborhoods by Seattle Parks and Recreation Parks and Green Spaces Levy to be used towards community gardens in Seattle.)

=== Development and expansion ===
In September 2012, the first trees were planted on the first 1.75 acres. Trees include apple, pear, plum, quince, medlar, hazelnut.

The P-Patch was established in 2014 with 27 plots.

On August 22, 2017, the Food Forest Collective attained nonprofit status.

In 2019, the food forest expanded by 1.5 acres.

In 2020, to support food banks during the COVID-19 pandemic, the food forest increased their vegetable production. The food forest is largely open harvest, which allows anyone to forage except for the designated food bank plot and the City of Seattle P-Patches.

==== sust̓əlǰixʷali” Traditional Indian Medicine garden ====
The “sust̓əlǰixʷali” Traditional Indian Medicine garden grows and cultivates Indigenous plants for medicinal use and food sovereignty. The garden's name originates from the Lushootseed language, which roughly translates to "a place where medicine is created." It has been developed by the Traditional Medicine Department of the Seattle Indian Health Board.

=== Outreach ===
The group began an extensive outreach campaign to garner support from the community and the City of Seattle. The effort was relatively successful, garnering significant responses from local permaculturalists as well as others involved in community gardener and ecologically conscious groups.

== Publicity ==
The project was covered by the Associated Press, National Public Radio and had a significant place in the monologue of The Late Late Show with Craig Ferguson, who joked that "in downtown LA they are talking about building a forest like this one in Seattle but instead of looking for berries its kinda like a petting zoo, you get to hand feed Kardashians".
