= Restaurant Nora =

Restaurant in Washington, D.C.

Coordinates: 38°54′46.1″N 77°2′50.6″W

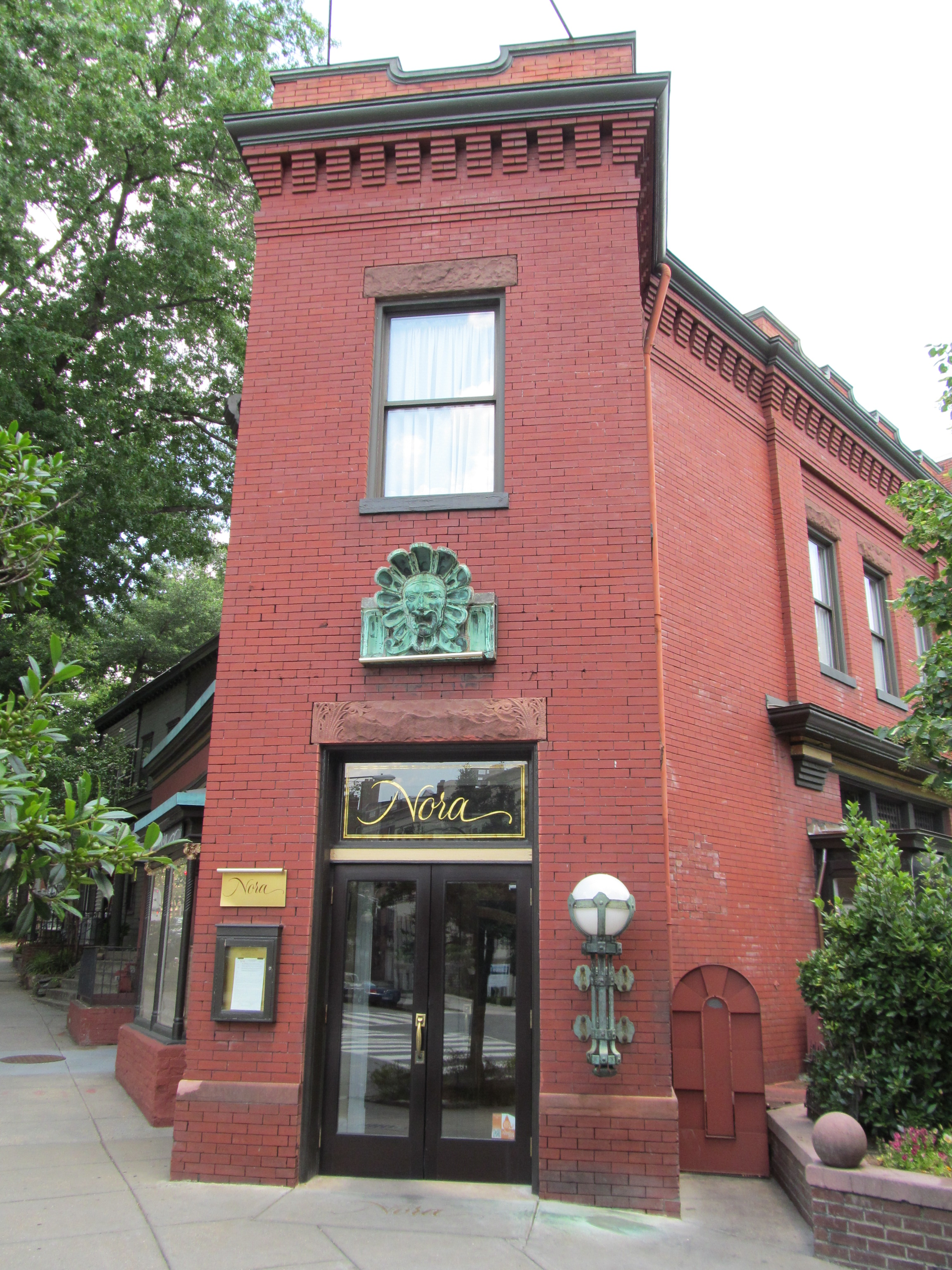
- Interactive map of Restaurant Nora

Restaurant information
- Established: 1979
- Closed: June 30, 2017
- Head chef: Nora Pouillon
- Food type: Local/organic
- Location: 2132 Florida Avenue NW, Washington, D.C., 20008, United States
- Website: noras.com

Restaurant Nora was a restaurant owned by chef Nora Pouillon in the Dupont Circle neighborhood of Washington, D.C., that opened in 1979 and closed in 2017. It has been reported as America's first certified organic restaurant.

== Opening and early years ==
In 1979, chef Nora Pouillon opened Restaurant Nora on the corner of Florida Avenue and 21st in the DuPont Circle neighborhood. Journalist Sally Quinn and her late husband, Washington Post executive editor, Ben Bradlee were early patrons and financial backers of the restaurant. Quinn offered a piece of advice: "Don't mention anything about being healthy and natural. That sounds so unappetizing. That sounds like hippie food." Pouillon ignored it, making her organic ingredients the focus of the restaurant.

The early reviews for Nora's were mixed, with Robert Shoffner of the Washingtonian less than enthusiastic about Pouillon's food. In 1980, The Washington Post's Phyllis Richman noted that "the cooking has matured," calling Nora's "a sophisticated return to old-fashioned home cooking, with dishes from here and there but ingredients only from impeccable sources that raise their meats without chemicals."

By the early 1990s, Nora's became a destination for D.C.'s media and political elite, particularly in the administration of President Bill Clinton. In 1996, Chef Nora was named U.S.A. Chef of the Year by the American Tasting Institute, and she published a cookbook, Cooking with Nora : seasonal menus from Restaurant Nora : healthy, light, balanced, and simple food with organic ingredients.

=== Organic certification ===
In 1999, Restaurant Nora was named certified-organic by the USDA's National Organic Program. Restaurant Nora subsequently became the first certified-organic restaurant in the country.

== Later years and closure ==
By the early 2000s, the restaurant had become a fixture in Washington's dining scene, and was named among Washingtonian magazine's "Very Best Restaurants." In 2016, Nora's was one of the approximately 100 restaurants reviewed in the first Michelin Guide for Washington, D.C.

Upon Chef Nora's retirement in June 2017, Restaurant Nora closed its doors. Prior to her retirement, Chef Nora received a Lifetime Achievement Award from the James Beard Foundation, celebrating her career at the restaurant.

== Notable patrons and events ==
Restaurant Nora has held lunches, dinners, and events for dignitaries, congressional members and White House administrations, such as Bill and Hillary Clinton, Vice President Al Gore and Tipper Gore, President Jimmy Carter, Nancy Reagan, Laura Bush, and Barack and Michelle Obama.
