= Washington Tilth Association =

American non-profit organization

- Formation: July 1, 1974
- Type: Non-profit organization
- Headquarters: Greenbank, Washington
- Region served: Washington State
- President: Andrew Stout
- Website: washingtontilth.org

The Washington Tilth Association (originally the Northwest Tilth Association) is an American nonprofit membership organization dedicated to supporting and advocating organic food and farming.

== Chapters ==
- Pierce Tilth Association
- Seattle Tilth
- South Whidbey Tilth
- Sno-Valley Tilth
- Spokane Tilth
- Tilth on the Willapa
- Tilth Producers of Washington
- Vashon Island Growers Assn. (VIGA)

== See also ==
- Oregon Tilth
- Agriculture in Washington
