= Sunnyside High School (Sunnyside, Washington) =

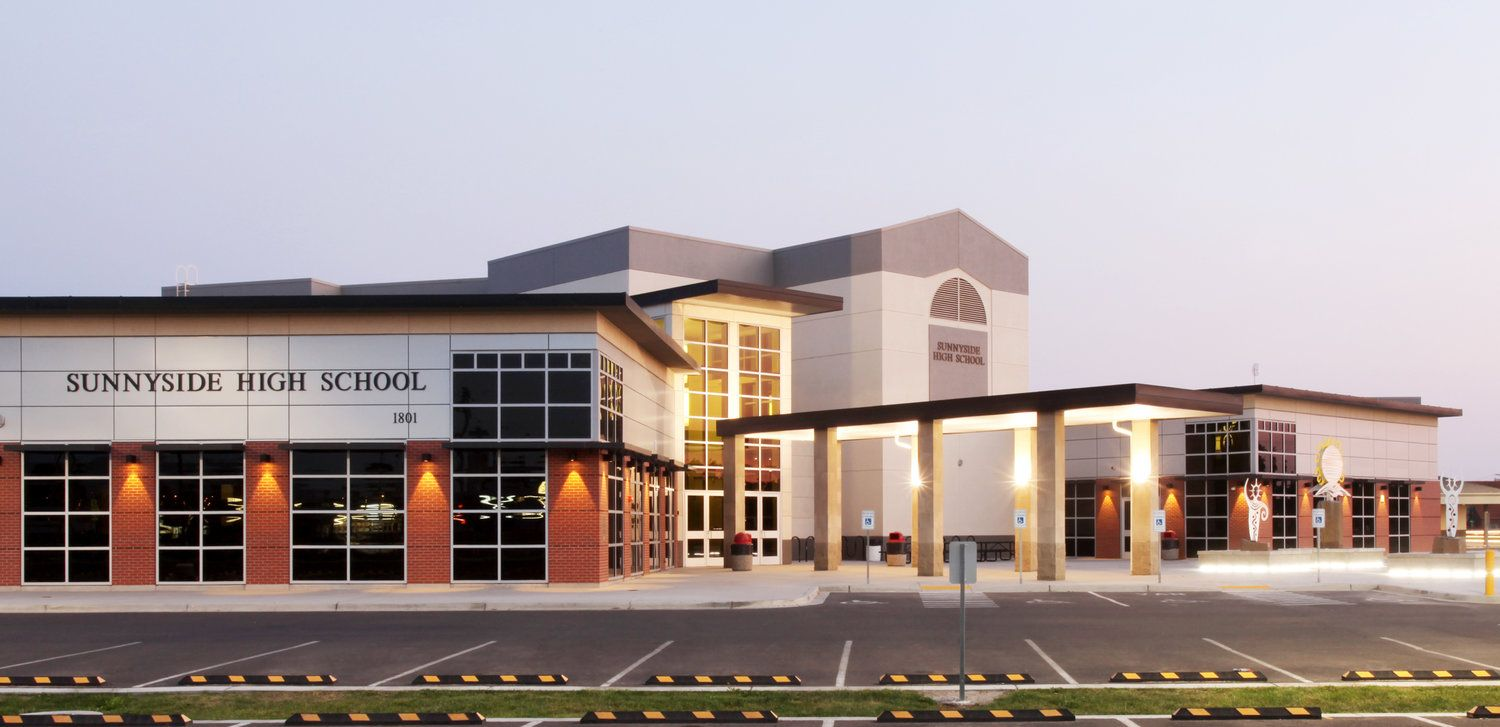
- Sunnyside High School Campus

Location
- 1801 E. Edison Avenue; Sunnyside, Washington; United States; 46°19′23″N 119°59′49″W

Information
- School district: Sunnyside School District
- Principal: Gabe Darbyson
- Teaching staff: 106 (FTE) (2022-23)
- Grades: 9–12
- Gender: Co-ed
- Enrollment: 2,169
- Student to teacher ratio: 20.4:1 (2022–23)
- Campus size: 4A
- Colors: Black, white and red
- Mascot: Grizzly
- Team name: Grizzlies
- Website: shs.sunnysideschools.org

Sunnyside High School (often abbreviated as SHS), is a 4A public high school located in Sunnyside, Washington, United States. This high school serves around 2,169 students from grades 9–12 as of 2024. Among its notable alumni are United States Republican Congressman Dan Newhouse, representing Washington’s 4th District in the U.S. House of Representatives, Dr. Bonnie Dunbar, a renowned NASA astronaut and scientist who has significantly advanced space exploration, and Scott Linehan, an NFL head coach. Sunnyside High School is fostered not only around its academia but its school culture, as the Grizzlies. Sunnyside High School roots itself in its mission of, "Together We Will" which says that learning not only occurs in the classroom and within the books but also outside of it and within the use of other limitless amounts of tools. Additionally, Sunnyside High School strives to assist students in building a life post-high school.

== History ==
In the early 2000s Sunnyside High School once faced low graduation rates around 49%. Due to these low graduation rates, in 2010, Sunnyside High School was awarded a $6 million Federal School Improvement grant. With this grant, and a combination of new monitoring systems Sunnyside High School was able to improve graduation rates to 90% which have remained steady to this day.

Such systems included the implementation of the All Hands On Deck Color Identification Monitoring Support System (AHOD). This is a system that allows staff to monitor whether students are on track to graduate based on attendance, grades and other necessary requirements.

AHOD consists of placing students in categories of red, orange, yellow, and green. If students were placed in red, for example, this implied that they were failing classes and needed to meet other state requirements. If placed in orange, this implied that students needed to pass a state exam. If placed in yellow, this indicated that the student was making progress toward graduation but still needed some credits. And at last, if placed in green this indicated that students were on track to graduate.

Overall, with the integration of this grant, and systems like the AHOD system, graduation rates were able to significantly increase. Therefore, Chuck Salina and Suzann Girtz in the School of Education (SOE) went on to write a book about this improvement, titled, "Powerless to Powerful" alongside Joanie Eppinga.

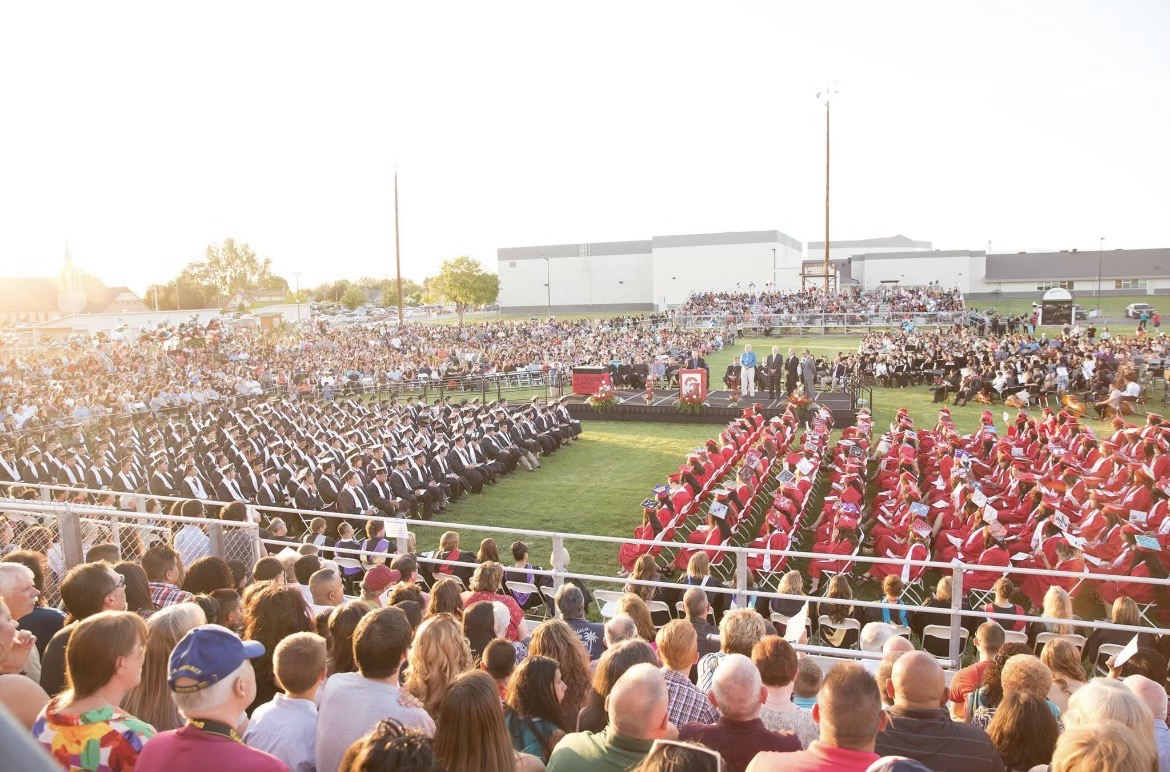
Sunnyside High School Graduation Commencement Ceremony of 2015

== Demographics ==
Within the 2023–2024 school year, 91.8% of the student body is Hispanic, while 6.8% are white. The rest (1.3%) is Black/ African American, American Indian/Alaskan Native, Asian, or Two or More Races. The school had 106 teachers in the 2022-2023 school year. Classroom size is 20.4 students with a teacher to student ratio of 41.2.

== Awards and recognition ==
In 2008, the graduation rate of Sunnyside High School was 49.8%. This low rate led to the school being awarded a School Improvement Grant, which was followed by an increase in graduation rate to 89.2%. In the 2022-2023 school year, graduation rates were 83.7%

Sunnyside High School was named a School of Distinction in 2015 and 2016. According to ESD105, "The Schools of Distinction Award goes to the top 5 percent of Washington schools that have attained the most outstanding levels of sustained improvement in English language arts, math, and graduation rates among their students over the past five years."

Sunnyside High School has also received awards for their staff, as former Principal Ryan Maxwell was named the 2016 Washington State High School Principal of the Year by the Association of Washington School Principals.

== Academic programs ==
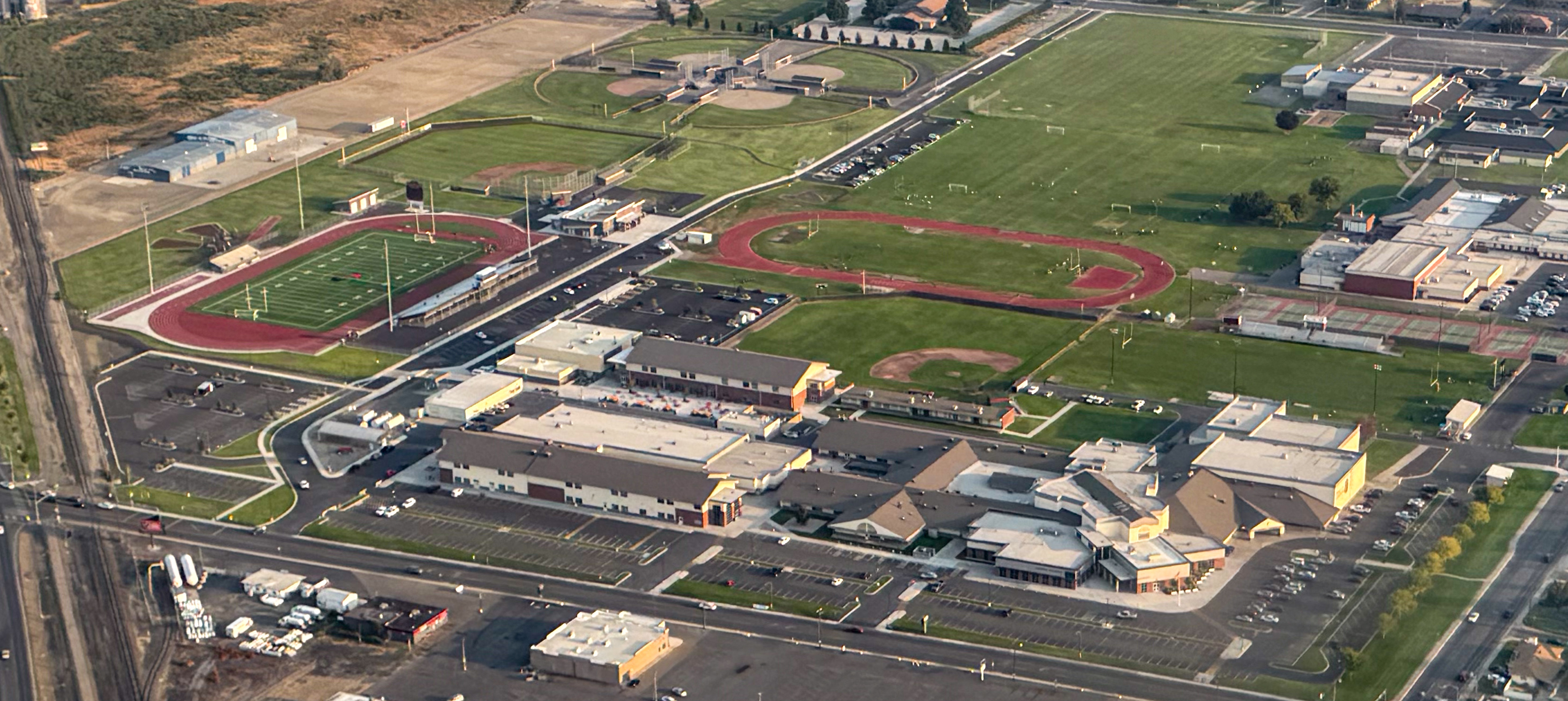
Aerial view of the school

Sunnyside High School offers opportunities for students to prepare themselves for life after high school, including SAT & ACT prep, college in the classroom courses, CTE Dual Start, and AP courses.

Sunnyside participates in the guaranteed admission program. This is a program that is partnered with several universities in Washington state and guarantees admission to students who complete the following requirements: Attaining a 3.0 GPA or above and having completed the courses necessary (College Academic Distribution Requirements, CADR) courses. Some of the universities partnered with Sunnyside High School are: University of Washington Tacoma, Eastern Washington University (EWU), Washington State University (WSU), Central Washington University (CWU), Evergreen, and Western Washington University (WWU).

Students can receive waivers when applying to take the PSAT, SAT and ACT. The school notifies students of scholarship opportunities and supports in financial aid applications.

Due to a substantial Hispanic population, Sunnyside High School offers career-planning resources in both English and Spanish to support both students and their parents in planning for a future after high school.

As mentioned, this high school offers the opportunity to take college in the classroom courses from Central Washington University, which can be transferable to the student's university of choice. CTE Dual Start is also offered here, where students are able to stay enrolled as high school students while taking community college courses at Yakima Valley College (YVC). These courses can later be transferred to the college of the students choice, depending on the requirements of the university.

== Notable alumni ==
• Dan Newhouse, Current U.S. Congressman

- Clint Ritchie, Actor
- Ed Barker, former NFL player
- Bonnie Dunbar, NASA astronaut
- Jake Kupp, former NFL player
- Scott Linehan, former NFL head coach
- Irving Newhouse, Washington state representative and senator
