= Jerry Taylor Veterans Plaza =

- 46.3231°N 120.0086°W
- Location: Sunnyside, Washington
- Material: Gray and black granite panels
- Length: One city block (approx. 150 m (492 ft))
- Weight: 114,000 lb (52,000 kg) partially completed in 2021 (6,000 lb (2,700 kg) per panel)
- Beginning date: 2014
- Dedicated to: Veterans of Sunnyside

Jerry Taylor Veterans Plaza is a plaza with a veterans memorial in Sunnyside, Washington. The plaza was dedicated in 1977, named for former Sunnyside mayor and World War II veteran Jerry Taylor.

An effort to rebuild the plaza as a veterans memorial began at least as early as 2006. Construction of the memorial began in 2014, with four panels by 2016, and as of 2021, the memorial consisted of nineteen 6,000-pound (2,700 kg) blocks of granite spanning the length of a city block on South 9th Street. The memorial is planned to contain 42 blocks when done and will be the largest such memorial in the Pacific Northwest. In addition to lists of names of servicemembers, some panels contain informative text on post-traumatic stress disorder or other issues relevant to veterans' affairs. One of the components of the installation is a 9/11 memorial.
