= Ed Barker (American football) =

American football player (1931–2012)

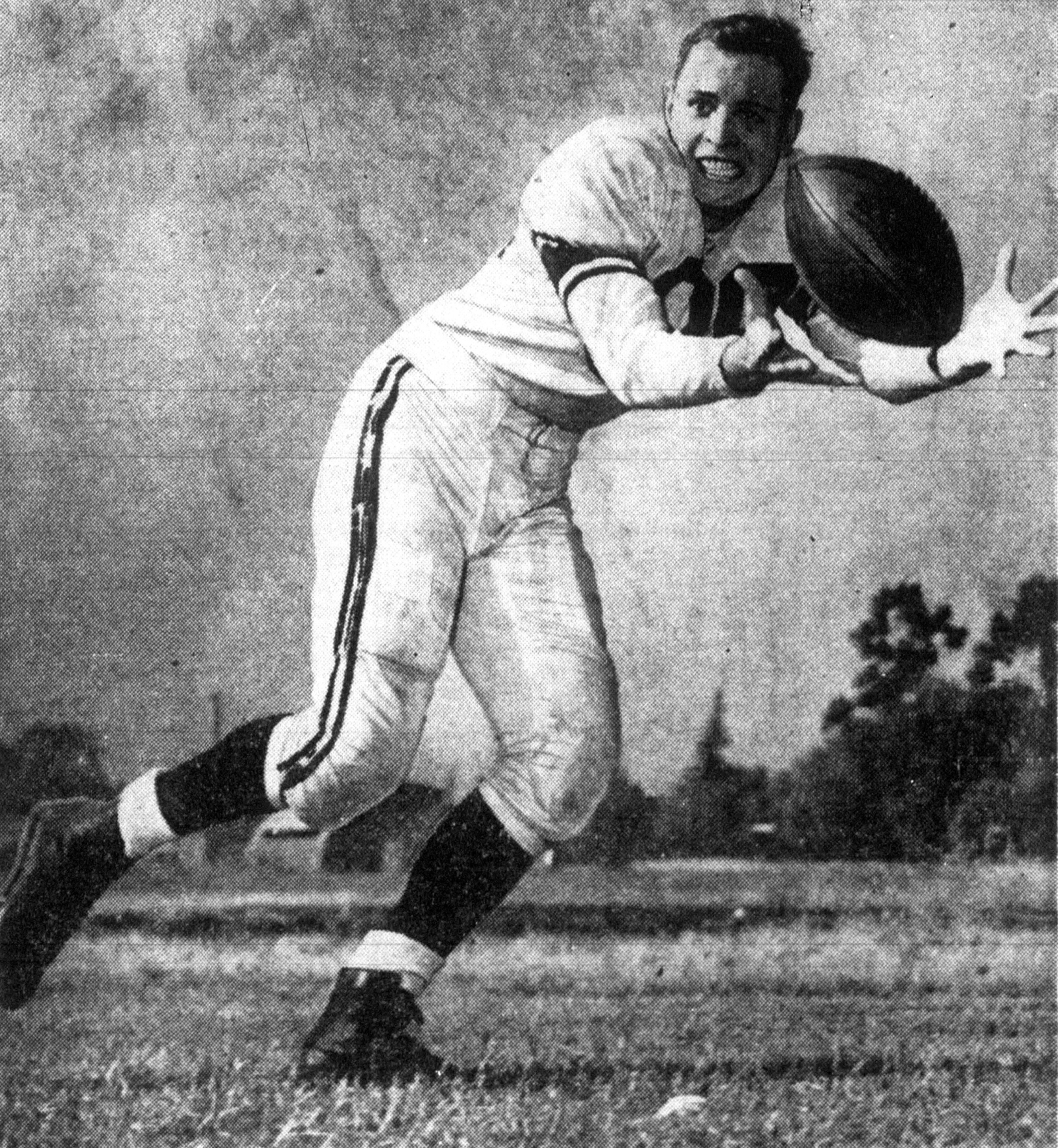
- Barker, circa 1953

No. 89, 87
- Position: End

Personal information
- Born: May 31, 1931; Dillon, Montana, U.S.
- Died: September 6, 2012 (aged 81); Zillah, Washington, U.S.
- Listed height: 6 ft 3 in (1.91 m)
- Listed weight: 196 lb (89 kg)

Career information
- High school: Sunnyside (Sunnyside, Washington)
- College: Washington State
- NFL draft: 1953: 1st round, 12th overall pick

Career history
- Pittsburgh Steelers (1953); Washington Redskins (1954)

Awards and highlights
- Third-team All-American (1951); First-team All-PCC (1951)

Career NFL statistics
- Receptions: 40
- Receiving yards: 525
- Receiving touchdowns: 4
- Stats at Pro Football Reference

Edward Ross Barker (May 31, 1931 – September 6, 2012) was an American professional football player who was an end for the Pittsburgh Steelers and Washington Redskins of the National Football League (NFL). He played college football for the Washington State Cougars and was selected 12th overall by the Los Angeles Rams in the first round of the 1953 NFL draft. After his short stint playing football he spent 20 years serving in the US Air Force, ending his career as a Lt. Colonel. He was elected into the Washington State University Hall of Fame in 2011.

Barker, shown here as a junior in 1951, played his college ball for Washington State College.

== See also ==
- List of NCAA major college football yearly receiving leaders
