= Craig Kupp =

American football player (born 1967)

No. 7, 9, 12, 10
- Position: Quarterback

Personal information
- Born: April 14, 1967 (age 59); Sunnyside, Washington, U.S.
- Listed height: 6 ft 4 in (1.93 m)
- Listed weight: 215 lb (98 kg)

Career information
- High school: Selah (WA)
- College: Pacific Lutheran
- NFL draft: 1990: 5th round, 135th overall pick

Career history
- New York Giants (1990)*; Phoenix Cardinals (1990–1991); Dallas Cowboys (1991–1992); → San Antonio Riders (1992); → Montreal Machine (1992)
- * Offseason or practice squad member only

Awards and highlights
- All-Frontier Conference (1986); All-Mt. Rainier League (1989); All-CFBHA (1989); Second-Team Little All-Northwest (1989)
- Stats at Pro Football Reference

Craig Marion Kupp (born April 14, 1967) is an American former professional football quarterback in the National Football League (NFL) for the Phoenix Cardinals and Dallas Cowboys. He played college football at Pacific Lutheran University.

== Early life ==
Kupp attended Selah High School, where he competed in football, basketball and tennis. He did not have a notable high school football career, so he was not highly recruited.

He accepted a football scholarship from Montana Technological University, where he received All-Frontier Conference honors as a quarterback and punter. He transferred to Pacific Lutheran University after his freshman season, to complete his studies closer to his home. As a sophomore in 1987, he was a backup behind Jeff Yarnell and was a part of the NAIA Division II national championship team.

As a junior in 1988, he became a starter at quarterback. His team eventually lost 35–56 in an NAIA Division II playoff game, after the Oregon Institute of Technology accomplished the biggest comeback in school history, by scoring 49 points in the second half. Kupp led his team to a 35–7 advantage at halftime, tallying a career-high 272 passing yards, 16-of-21 completions, 2 passing touchdowns and one rushing touchdown, before fracturing his left ankle with just two minutes left in the first half.

As a senior in 1989, he made 185-of-286 pass completions (64.7%) for 2,398 yards (school record), 25 touchdowns (third in school history) and 3 interceptions, setting the record for passing yards in a season and an NAIA Division II record for interception rate with a 1.04% mark. Against Southern Oregon University, he set school records for passing yards (411) and touchdown throws (6) in a single-game, while leading his team to a 52–50 win. He received All-Columbia Football Association honors at the end of the season.

He finished his college career with 300-of-499 completions for 3,921 yards (fourth in school history), 41 touchdowns (fourth in school history) and 11 interceptions. In 2003, he was inducted into the Pacific Lutheran Athletic Hall of Fame.

== Professional career ==
=== New York Giants ===
Kupp was selected by the New York Giants in the 5th round (135th overall) of the 1990 NFL draft. He was the ninth quarterback taken. He was released before the start of the season on September 3, after not being able to pass Matt Cavanaugh on the depth chart.

=== Phoenix Cardinals ===
In September 1990, Kupp signed with Phoenix Cardinals and spent the rest of the year on the practice squad. In 1991, a training camp knee injury to starting quarterback Timm Rosenbach, allowed Kupp to gain additional playing experience. In his only professional football game, Kupp completed 3-of-7 attempts for 23 yards in the fourth quarter of the Cardinals' 34–0 loss to the Washington Redskins in week 3. On November 6, 1991, he was released to make room for quarterback Chris Chandler.

=== Dallas Cowboys ===
On November 7, 1991, Kupp was claimed off waivers by the Dallas Cowboys. After starter Troy Aikman suffered a knee injury in the twelfth game against the Washington Redskins, Kupp ascended from third-string to backup quarterback behind Steve Beuerlein.

In 1992, Kupp was one of three Cowboys players to be allocated to the World League of American Football. He spent the first six weeks of the season with the San Antonio Riders, having scant action, before being acquired by the Montreal Machine, where he spent the remainder of the season as a backup. He made 11-of-27 completions for 138 yards, one touchdown and 4 interceptions. He was released by the Cowboys on August 31.

== Personal life ==
Kupp's father, Jake, was a guard in the NFL for the New Orleans Saints and the Dallas Cowboys. His elder son, Cooper, is a wide receiver for the Seattle Seahawks while his younger son Ketner is a former linebacker for the Los Angeles Rams. Cooper won the Walter Payton Award in 2015 and owns nearly every major career FCS receiving record.
