= Jake Kupp =

American football player (born 1941)

No. 67, 65, 50
- Positions: Guard, Tight end

Personal information
- Born: March 12, 1941 (age 85); Pasadena, California, U.S.
- Listed height: 6 ft 3 in (1.91 m)
- Listed weight: 248 lb (112 kg)

Career information
- High school: Sunnyside (Sunnyside, Washington)
- College: Washington (1959-1963)
- NFL draft: 1964: 9th round, 116th overall pick

Career history
- Dallas Cowboys (1964–1965); Washington Redskins (1966); New Orleans Saints (1967); Atlanta Falcons (1967); New Orleans Saints (1968–1975)

Awards and highlights
- NFL All-Rookie team (1964); Pro Bowl (1969); New Orleans Saints Hall of Fame (1992); New Orleans Saints 25-Year All-Time Team; New Orleans Saints 40-Year All-Time Team; New Orleans Saints 50-Year All-Time Team

Career NFL statistics
- Games played: 154
- Games started: 131
- Receptions: 4
- Receiving yards: 28
- Stats at Pro Football Reference

Jacob Ralph Kupp (born March 12, 1941) is an American former professional football player who was a guard in the National Football League (NFL) for the New Orleans Saints, Dallas Cowboys, Washington Redskins, and Atlanta Falcons. He played college football for the Washington Huskies. He made the 1964 NFL All-Rookie Team at guard, and was an NFL Pro Bowl selection in 1969. He was the Saints' offensive team captain for five years. In 1992, Kupp was inducted into the Saints Hall of Fame. He was named to the Saints' 25th, 40th, and 50th anniversary all-time teams. His son Craig Kupp and grandson Cooper Kupp were also drafted by NFL teams and played in the NFL.

== Early life ==
Kupp was born on March 12, 1941, in Pasadena, California, and lived there until he was five-years old. He also spent a number of his childhood years in Nebraska, and his family later moved to Sunnyside, Washington. His grandfather Jake O. Kupp was born in Zurich, Switzerland and emigrated to the United States at 16-years old, becoming a farmer in Columbus, Nebraska. In 1917, Jake O. Kupp married Kupp's grandmother, Hulda Mueller, in Columbus. In 1950, the family moved to Sunnyside, Washington, becoming prominent grape growers.

Kupp attended Sunnyside High School, in Sunnyside, Washington, where he played football, basketball and baseball. Kupp was known as "Buster" in high school. He played quarterback and was an offensive end on the school's football team during his career at Sunnyside, with responsibilities as a receiver and blocker at end. Kupp was a quarterback as a sophomore (1956), and played offensive end as a junior (1957) and senior (1958). He was 6 ft 2 in (1.88 m) 190 lb (86.2 kg) going into the 1958 football season. Kupp had 35 receptions for five touchdowns as a senior.

Kupp was an All-State end in high school. In August 1959, he played in the Washington high school East West All-Star Game held in Spokane, Washington.

Kupp became a varsity basketball player as a junior (1957–58). In his senior year, the basketball team finished third in the 1959 Washington State High School Class AA Basketball tournament, with Kupp leading all players in assists in that tournament. Sunnyside defeated Snohomish High School, 57–56, for third place in the tournament; with Kupp tipping away a Snohomish inbounds pass in the final seconds to secure the victory. During his baseball career at Sunnyside, Kupp pitched a no-hitter.

== College career ==
He accepted a football scholarship from the University of Washington, where he obtained a degree in education. He played offensive tackle, offensive end and defensive end, under head coach Jim Owens for the Huskies. Kupp was redshirted in 1960. Kupp is also reported to have played linebacker for the Huskies.

Kupp was a varsity football player from 1961 to 1963. As a sophomore in 1961, the team's coaches decided his best position would be left tackle; even though the 6 ft 3 in Kupp weighed only 200 lb (90.1 kg). He had considerable playing time in the season's first two games, including playing almost the full sixty minutes against Illinois in the second game. While he played tackle to begin the 1961 season, Kupp was moved to left end in mid-November, where he split playing time with two other players.

Kupp began his junior season (1962) at tackle. He was used on both offense and defense as part of the Huskies second unit, playing considerable minutes during games; being described as an aggressive player. He was the team's starting left tackle in the late-November rivalry game against the Washington State Cougars, on an offensive line that included future NFL center Ray Mansfield. As defensive players in that game, Kupp, Mansfield, and teammate John Stupey tackled the Cougars' quarterback for a safety.

Kupp was 6 ft 3 in (1.91 m) 205 lb (93 kg) as a senior in 1963. He became a full-time starter in his senior season, playing at tackle and right end. Kupp had six receptions for 126 yards and two touchdowns that season. His two touchdown receptions were in an October 19 game against Stanford; one for 36 or 38 yards and the other for 32 yards. Although the team only won six games that season, the Huskies played in the Rose Bowl. Kupp was a starting offensive lineman for the Huskies in the January 1, 1964 Rose Bowl against Illinois, a 17–7 loss. Kupp's only reception in that game was for –5 yards. Among Kupp's 1963 Huskie teammates were future NFL players Junior Coffey, Dave Kopay, Ron Medved, and Rick Redman.

He was also a pitcher for the Huskies' baseball team. He was the leading pitcher for the Huskies in 1963. Coach Owens had allowed Kupp to forego spring football practice in 1963, so Kupp could play baseball for the Huskies.

== Professional career ==
=== Dallas Cowboys ===
Kupp was selected by the Dallas Cowboys in the ninth round (116th overall) of the 1964 NFL draft as a tight end. At the time of the NFL draft in early December 1963, Kupp weighed only 203 lb (92.1 kg). The University of Washington had recently built a new weight room, and after the draft Kupp worked out with John Meyers and Jim Skaggs; former Huskie teammates who had earlier graduated and were both going to play for the Philadelphia Eagles going into the 1964 NFL season. Kupp got his weight up to 229 lb (103.9 kg) by the time he joined the Cowboys in training camp.

The Cowboys originally tried him at tight end in training camp, but later moved him to offensive guard. The Cowboys reportedly put him on the waiver list in early September 1964 during training camp, but he is reported as participating in the team's training camp just days later, being given an opportunity to try out on the offensive line. Kupp made the 1964 Cowboys' team as an offensive guard, and started 11 games at left guard during the season. Kupp made United Press International's (UPI) and the Pro Football Writers of America 1964 NFL All-Rookie teams at guard. The next year he started all 14 games at left guard.

=== Washington Redskins ===
On August 30, 1966, Kupp was traded to the Washington Redskins, along with Brig Owens and Mitch Johnson, in exchange for Jim Steffen and a fifth round draft choice in the 1967 NFL/AFL draft (119th overall – Willie Parker). Kupp was described as a guard at the time of the trade. Washington converted Kupp from a guard to a tight end in 1966, because the coaching staff considered that Kupp lacked the necessary size for the offensive line. Kupp appeared in 14 games, with four receptions for 28 yards, as a backup behind Jerry Smith. He moved to the New Orleans Saints when Washington left Kupp unprotected in the February 1967 NFL expansion draft.

=== New Orleans Saints (first stint) ===
Kupp became one of the original members of the New Orleans Saints, after being selected in the 1967 NFL expansion draft. He played in five regular season games, four as a starter at left guard, before being released in early November 1967.

=== Atlanta Falcons ===
On November 6, 1967, the Atlanta Falcons claimed Kupp off waivers. Kupp started six games at left guard for the Falcons.

=== New Orleans Saints (second stint) ===
Although the rights to his contract were traded to the Atlanta Falcons, it was only one year, instead of his full two-year contract, forcing his return in 1968 to the New Orleans Saints, based on a league ruling that long term contract players can be waived one season only (rule since rescinded). He was the Saints' starting left guard in 56 consecutive games from 1968 to 1971. He excelled as a pulling guard for the Saints. Kupp was named the Saints' offensive captain in 1969, along with Doug Atkins as defensive captain, and continued in that role for the Saints for five years (1969 to 1973). Kupp made the Pro Bowl as an offensive guard in 1969.

He was second-year quarterback Archie Manning's roommate in the team's 1972 training camp. In the second game of the 1972 NFL season, Kupp suffered serious ligament damage in his left knee during a Monday Night Football game against the Kansas City Chiefs on September 25. He did not start another game for the rest of the season. He returned to start all 14 games at left guard for the Saints in 1973.

Kupp retired at the end of the 1973 season, believing he had lost a step, and not wanting to be an aging veteran who could no longer properly keep up in playing his position. He changed his mind and reported to training camp the following year (1974). Kupp believed that after his 1972 injury and a rough 1973 training camp, he had not fully recovered during the 1973 season. Going into the 1974 season, Kupp felt renewed strength and vigor in his legs and that he could join the team and play at the level he expected of himself. He started all 14 games at left guard for the Saints in 1974.

Kupp returned in 1975, and started all 11 games at left guard in which he appeared. He was the last of the original New Orleans Saints still on the team, and was the only member of the team over 29-years old. Coach John North had traded many of the team's veterans after the 1974 season, but kept Kupp. During their nine-year history, the Saints had never had a winning season, never winning more than five games in a season during that period. The Saints' first-round draft pick rookie guard Kurt Schumacher said during the 1975 season "'It's amazing how much enthusiasm Kupp still has after all these years in the league. . . . He still takes the time with me after practice to teach me the little things I need to know to do my job'".

Schumacher started three games for the Saints at left guard in 1975, but Kupp returned to start the season's final game on December 21; which would be the last of his career. Kupp retired before the start of the 1976 season.

== Legacy and honors ==
Kupp started 101 games for the Saints. Although Kupp never experienced a winning season with the franchise, he was inducted into the New Orleans Saints Hall of Fame in 1992. Kupp was named to the Saints' 25th anniversary all-time team. The Gannett News Service included Kupp on its 1999 Saints' all-time team. The Saints' Hall of Fame selection committee named Kupp to its 40th anniversary Saints all-time team, but replaced him with Jahri Evans on its 45th anniversary all-time Saints team. Kupp was named to the Saints' 50th anniversary all-time team, that included the top 50 players in team history.

In 2018, the Saints honored Kupp before a game with the Los Angeles Rams by naming him honorary captain that day and allowing him to participate in the pregame coin toss. Kupp's grandson Cooper Kupp played for the Rams, and he was also named honorary captain that day for the Rams to participate in the coin toss with his grandfather. Kupp wore a shirt with the Saints logo during the coin toss, but once in the stands he removed that shirt to reveal a Rams shirt in support of his grandson.

== Personal life ==
During his career Kupp was an active member of the Fellowship of Christian Athletes. In July 1971, he was among 40 NFL players attending the Pro Players Christian Leadership Conference in Dallas. Kupp was considered more intellectual and well-spoken that most players during his career, and had a weekly radio show while with the Saints. He was called one of the best public speakers among NFL players.

While still playing in the NFL, Kupp appeared in a locker room scene of the 1969 film Number One, starring Charlton Heston as an aging quarterback on the Saints. After retiring as a player, Kupp returned to Washington, and currently resides in Yakima, Washington. He worked with the Seattle-based Pacific Institution, and gave motivational talks to high school students across Washington. He later worked as a sales manager and general manager for a food distribution company. He then became president of Quest International for 14 years, a marketing company in Yakima. He retired in 2003.

Kupp's family continued the tradition of participating in college and professional football. Kupp's younger brother Andy Kupp played guard at the University of Idaho, and played professional football for the Edmonton Eskimos of the Canadian Football League in 1973, and the Detroit Wheels and Houston Texans of the World Football League in 1974. He had been selected by the Saints in the 10th round of the 1972 NFL draft at offensive guard.

After playing quarterback at Pacific Lutheran University, Kupp's son Craig Kupp was drafted by the New York Giants in the fifth round of the 1990 NFL draft. He played in one game for the Phoenix Cardinals in 1991, and was a reserve quarterback for the Dallas Cowboys that season.

Kupp's grandson Cooper Kupp, Craig's son, played eight years with the Los Angeles Rams and currently plays for the Seattle Seahawks (through 2025); after being drafted by the Rams in the third round of the 2017 NFL draft. Cooper is among the top two players all-time in receptions in a single season and receiving yards in a single season. Cooper and his brother Ketner Cupp played football at Eastern Washington University. Ketner tried out for the Rams in 2019, but did not make the roster. He later spent five years as defensive coordinator at Pacific Lutheran, and joined the Las Vegas Raiders as a defensive quality control coach in March 2026. Kupp's family is one of only five in NFL history to have three generations play in the NFL, and one of only three to have three generations selected in the NFL draft.
