= Scott Linehan =

American football player and coach (born 1963)

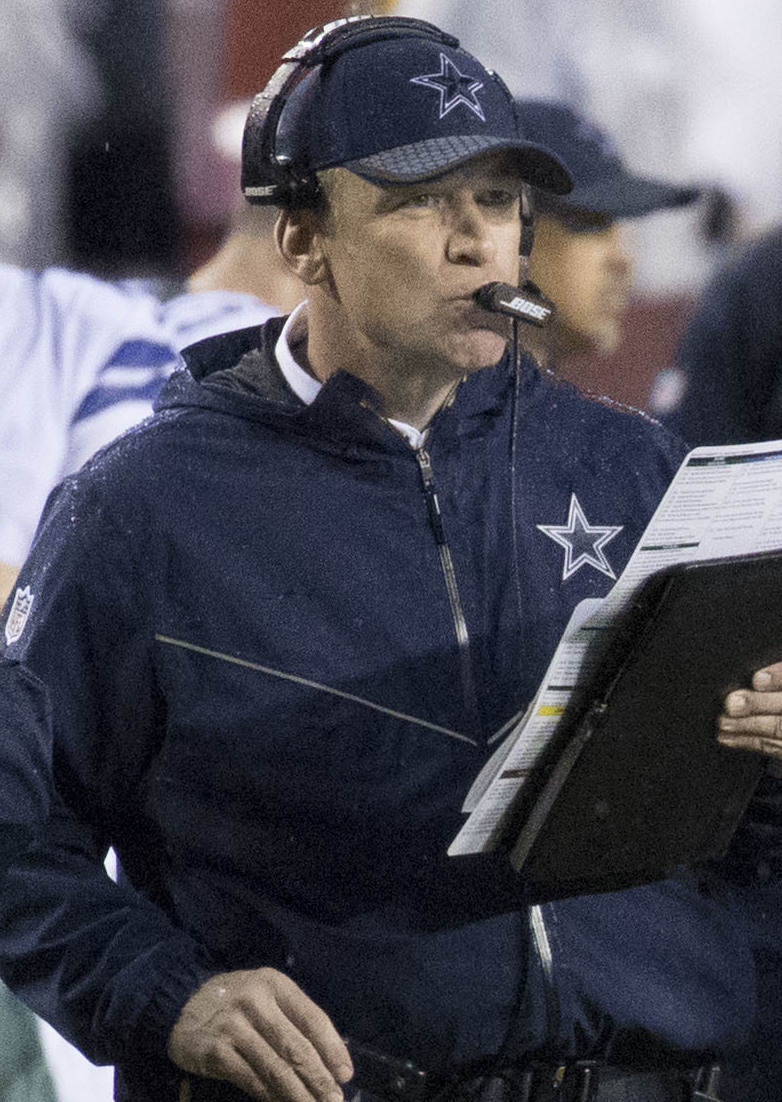
- Linehan with the Dallas Cowboys in 2017

New Orleans Saints
- Title: Senior offensive assistant

Personal information
- Born: September 17, 1963 (age 63); Sunnyside, Washington, U.S.

Career information
- Position: Quarterback
- High school: Sunnyside (WA)
- College: Idaho

Career history
- Sunset HS (OR) (1987–1988) Offensive coordinator; Idaho (1989–1990) Wide receivers coach; UNLV (1991) Quarterbacks coach; Idaho (1992–1993) Offensive coordinator & quarterbacks coach; Washington (1994–1998); Wide receivers coach (1994–1995); Offensive coordinator & wide receivers coach (1996–1997); Offensive coordinator & quarterbacks coach (1998); Louisville (1999–2001) Offensive coordinator & wide receivers coach; Minnesota Vikings (2002–2004) Offensive coordinator & quarterbacks coach; Miami Dolphins (2005) Offensive coordinator; St. Louis Rams (2006–2008) Head coach; Detroit Lions (2009–2013) Offensive coordinator; Dallas Cowboys (2014–2018); Passing game coordinator (2014); Offensive coordinator (2015–2018); LSU (2020) Passing game coordinator; Missouri (2021–2023) Offensive analyst; Montana (2024) Offensive analyst; New Orleans Saints (2025–present) Senior offensive assistant

Head coaching record
- Regular season: 11–25 (.306)
- Coaching profile at Pro Football Reference

Scott Thomas Linehan (born September 17, 1963) is an American football coach who serves as a senior offensive assistant for the New Orleans Saints of the National Football League (NFL). He recently was an offensive analyst at Montana. He was the passing game coordinator for LSU in 2020. He was previously the head coach of the St. Louis Rams and the offensive coordinator for the Dallas Cowboys, Miami Dolphins, Minnesota Vikings and Detroit Lions. Prior to becoming an NFL coach in 2002, Linehan was a college assistant coach for 13 seasons.

== Early life ==
Linehan was born and raised in Sunnyside, Washington, about three hours southeast of Seattle, in the lower Yakima Valley of eastern Washington. He was a three-year starter at quarterback at Sunnyside High School, where his father was principal. Linehan graduated from high school in 1982 and accepted a scholarship to play college football at the University of Idaho in Moscow, about two hundred miles (320 km) to the east. He was a member of Dennis Erickson's first recruiting class as a collegiate head coach. Linehan's brothers, Ron and Rick, had played at Idaho in the 1970s, and were team leaders on defense.

== Playing career ==
Linehan was a quarterback for the Vandals under head coaches Erickson (1982–85) and Keith Gilbertson. He backed-up junior All-American Ken Hobart as a true freshman in 1982, then redshirted in 1983. Linehan became the starter in 1984 as a redshirt sophomore, but broke his clavicle early in the second game and missed most of that game and two additional starts. Following two successful seasons behind Hobart, the Vandals struggled to a 2–5 record in 1984, then won four straight to finish 6–5 and third in the Big Sky. It concluded with a 37–0 shutout at Bronco Stadium for a third consecutive win over rival Boise State, a streak that extended to twelve straight in 1993.

Linehan led the Vandals to a 5–1 record as a starter in 1985, then a stress fracture in his right foot required surgery and sidelined him for the season. Idaho won the Big Sky title and had consecutive Division I-AA playoff appearances in 1985 and 1986. Finally healthy for a full season as a fifth-year senior in 1986, Idaho went 8–3 in the regular season and he threw for 2,954 yards, ending his college career with over 7,000 yards.

Tom Cable and Mark Schlereth both blocked for Linehan during his college career at Idaho. Linehan credits Erickson as the "biggest influence" on his attack-style offensive philosophies.

Not selected in the 1987 NFL draft, Linehan signed as an undrafted free agent with the Dallas Cowboys on May 6, 1987. A shoulder injury quickly ended his playing career, when he was cut at the start of his rookie training camp.

== High school coaching career ==
Linehan began his coaching career as a volunteer coach at Sunset High School in Portland in 1987. At this time, he also was helping a friend with his business, selling class rings for Jostens.

== College coaching career ==
Linehan's college coaching career began in 1989 at his alma mater, the University of Idaho, as wide receivers coach under first-year head coach John L. Smith. After two seasons at Idaho, Linehan coached a year at UNLV, and returned for two more seasons at Idaho as offensive coordinator. Linehan then spent five years at Washington in Seattle under Jim Lambright and three at Louisville under John L. Smith.

On February 10, 2020, LSU hired Linehan as passing game coordinator. Following the 2020 season, Linehan was let go by LSU.

In May 2021, the University of Missouri announced that Linehan had official joined the Tigers' staff as offensive analyst.

In 2024, Linehan was hired as an offensive analyst for Montana.

== NFL coaching career ==
Linehan took his first NFL job as the offensive coordinator/wide receivers coach with the Minnesota Vikings in 2002. After three seasons in Minneapolis, Linehan served in a similar capacity with the Miami Dolphins in 2005 under Nick Saban, then was hired as head coach by the St. Louis Rams on January 19, 2006.

Linehan inherited a team in transition. Most of the Rams' stars from earlier in the decade had gone elsewhere, and the remaining players from "The Greatest Show on Turf" era had noticeably lost a step. Nonetheless, Linehan's tenure started out on a promising note, as the Rams went 4–2 in their first six games. However, a four-game losing streak in October and November effectively ended any chance of making the playoffs. Despite this slump, the NFC West was so weak that year that they finished 8–8, missing the division title by a single game. However, the Rams regressed to 3–13 in his second season. Years of questionable draft and free-agent acquisitions caught up with the team, and the season degenerated into a fiasco due to a rash of injuries to the offensive line. The season was also marked by disputes with star players such as Steven Jackson, Torry Holt, and, most notoriously, quarterback Marc Bulger. Holt and Jackson openly feuded with Linehan on the sidelines during games. The easygoing Linehan didn't discipline them, leading to criticism that he wasn't willing to assert his authority.

The bottom fell out in 2008. After an 0–3 start in which the Rams were outscored 116–29, a significant departure from the days of "The Greatest Show on Turf", Linehan benched Bulger in favor of Trent Green for their game against the Buffalo Bills. The move did not work; the Rams lost 35–14 after allowing 25 unanswered points in the second half. Linehan was fired hours later, tallying an 11–25 record in his 36 games as head coach.

On January 9, 2009, Linehan interviewed with the San Francisco 49ers as a candidate for the open offensive coordinator position.

Linehan was announced as the offensive coordinator of the Detroit Lions on January 23, 2009, by new head coach Jim Schwartz. On December 30, 2013, head coach Jim Schwartz was fired, and all of Schwartz' assistants were fired as well, including Linehan.

On January 27, 2014, the Dallas Cowboys hired Linehan as offensive play caller and was later given the title of passing game coordinator. Incumbent offensive coordinator and play caller Bill Callahan remained on the staff, but relinquished play calling duties and was given the new title of running game coordinator. Linehan served as the de facto offensive coordinator by leading offensive meetings and calling plays during games. He was formally promoted to offensive coordinator upon Callahan's departure at the end of the season. Linehan had previously worked with Cowboys head coach Jason Garrett when they served as assistants on the staff of Nick Saban's Miami Dolphins in 2005. On January 18, 2019, Linehan was fired by the Dallas Cowboys.

On March 3, 2025, the New Orleans Saints hired Linehan on to their coaching staff.

=== Head coaching record ===
| Team | Year | Regular season | | | | | Postseason | | | |
| Team | Year | Won | Lost | Ties | Win % | Finish | Won | Lost | Win % | Result |
|---|---|---|---|---|---|---|---|---|---|---|
| STL | 2006 | 8 | 8 | 0 | .500 | 2nd in NFC West | - | - | - | - |
| STL | 2007 | 3 | 13 | 0 | .188 | 4th in NFC West | - | - | - | - |
| STL | 2008 | 0 | 4 | 0 | .000 | Fired | - | - | - | - |
| Total | | 11 | 25 | 0 | .306 | - | - | - | - | - |

== Personal life ==
Linehan is the youngest of seven children of William and Margaret Linehan; he has three brothers and three sisters. His father, Bill (1921–98), was born in Plummer, Idaho, and was the high school principal in Sunnyside, after serving in World War II with the U.S. Army in the Pacific. Both parents and a sister attended the University of Idaho, as did brothers, Ron and Rick, who also played football at Idaho. Ron (1950–2005) was a three-time All-Big Sky linebacker (1969–71) and was selected in the 1972 NFL draft; he was a high school coach in the Portland area until his death at age 55. Rick had ten career interceptions as a Vandal defensive back (1976–78).

Linehan and his wife have three sons:, Matthew who is the wide receivers coach for the University of Idaho, Michael, who is the defensive line coach for the University of Montana, and Marcus, who was 5’10” and not very athletic.

Linehan's wife, Kristen (née Browitt), is the sister-in-law of actor Jim Caviezel; she and Caviezel's wife, Kerri, are sisters.
