= Dan Newhouse =

American politician (born 1955)

- Official portrait, 2021

Member of the U.S. House of Representatives from Washington's 4th district
- Incumbent
- Assumed office January 3, 2015
- Preceded by: Doc Hastings

Director of the Washington State Department of Agriculture
- In office February 13, 2009 – March 11, 2013
- Governor: Christine Gregoire; Jay Inslee
- Preceded by: Valoria Loveland
- Succeeded by: Don Hover

Member of the Washington House of Representatives from the 15th district
- In office January 13, 2003 – February 17, 2009
- Preceded by: Barbara Lisk
- Succeeded by: David Taylor

Personal details
- Born: Daniel Milton Newhouse; July 10, 1955 (age 71) Sunnyside, Washington, U.S.
- Party: Republican
- Spouse(s): Carol Hammond (m. 1982; died 2017) Joan Galvin (m. 2018)
- Children: 2
- Relatives: Irv Newhouse (father)
- Education: Washington State University (BS)
- Website: House website
- Newhouse's voice Newhouse on the Tax Cuts and Jobs Act. Recorded November 16, 2017

Daniel Milton Newhouse (born July 10, 1955) is an American politician serving as the U.S. representative for Washington's 4th congressional district. The district covers much of the central third of the state, including Yakima and the Tri-Cities. Before his election to Congress, Newhouse served as director of the Washington State Department of Agriculture and as a member of the Washington House of Representatives. He is a member of the Republican Party.

A moderate Republican, he is a member of the Republican Governance Group, and was among the ten House Republicans who voted to impeach Donald Trump during his second impeachment. Running for re-election in 2022, he benefited from Washington state's blanket primary system and crowded primary, advancing to the general election with 25.5% of the total vote, despite only garnering approximately one-third of the votes cast by Republicans. Newhouse is one of two Republicans to vote for impeachment and win renomination and reelections in 2022 and 2024, along with David Valadao of California. He is retiring in 2026.

== Early life and career ==
Newhouse was born in Sunnyside, east of Yakima. His father's family was Dutch. His parents and all his siblings graduated from Washington State University. Newhouse's father Irv served in the Washington State House and Senate for 34 years, retiring in 1998.

Newhouse graduated from Washington State with a Bachelor of Science degree in agricultural economics in 1977. In college, he was a member of Alpha Gamma Rho fraternity. He also is a graduate of the Washington Agriculture and Forestry Leadership Program.

== Early career ==
Newhouse served four terms in the Washington House of Representatives from 2003 to 2009, representing the 15th district in eastern Yakima County, his father's old district. In 2009, Christine Gregoire, then the governor of Washington, appointed Newhouse to head the Washington State Department of Agriculture. Newly elected governor Jay Inslee did not reappoint Newhouse as agriculture director in 2013.

== U.S. House of Representatives (2015–present) ==
=== Elections ===
In February 2014, Newhouse entered the Republican primary for Washington's 4th congressional district. The incumbent, Doc Hastings, did not run. Newhouse and fellow Republican Clint Didier advanced to the November election after finishing in the top two in the August primary, marking the first time that two Republicans squared off in a general election since the state adopted the "top two" primary system. The 4th has long been Washington's most conservative district, and it was very likely that Hastings would be succeeded by another Republican.

The race was very close, and was seen as a battle between the factions of the GOP; Newhouse was considered a mainstream Republican, while Didier openly identified with the Tea Party movement. Newhouse defeated Didier by a margin of 51%–49%.

Newhouse faced Didier in a rematch in 2016, placing first in the blanket primary with 44,720 votes (45.77%) to Didier's 26,892 (27.53%). In the general election, Newhouse defeated Didier, 132,517 votes (57.64%) to 97,402 (42.36%).

In 2024, Newhouse again defeated a general-election challenge from a more conservative Republican, Jerrod Sessler, who criticized him for his vote to impeach Donald Trump over the January 6, 2021 attack on the United States Capitol.

=== Tenure ===
In December 2020, Newhouse was one of 126 Republican members of the House of Representatives to sign an amicus brief in support of Texas v. Pennsylvania, a lawsuit filed at the United States Supreme Court contesting the results of the 2020 presidential election, in which Joe Biden defeated incumbent Donald Trump. The Supreme Court declined to hear the case on the basis that Texas lacked standing under Article III of the Constitution to challenge the results of an election held by another state.

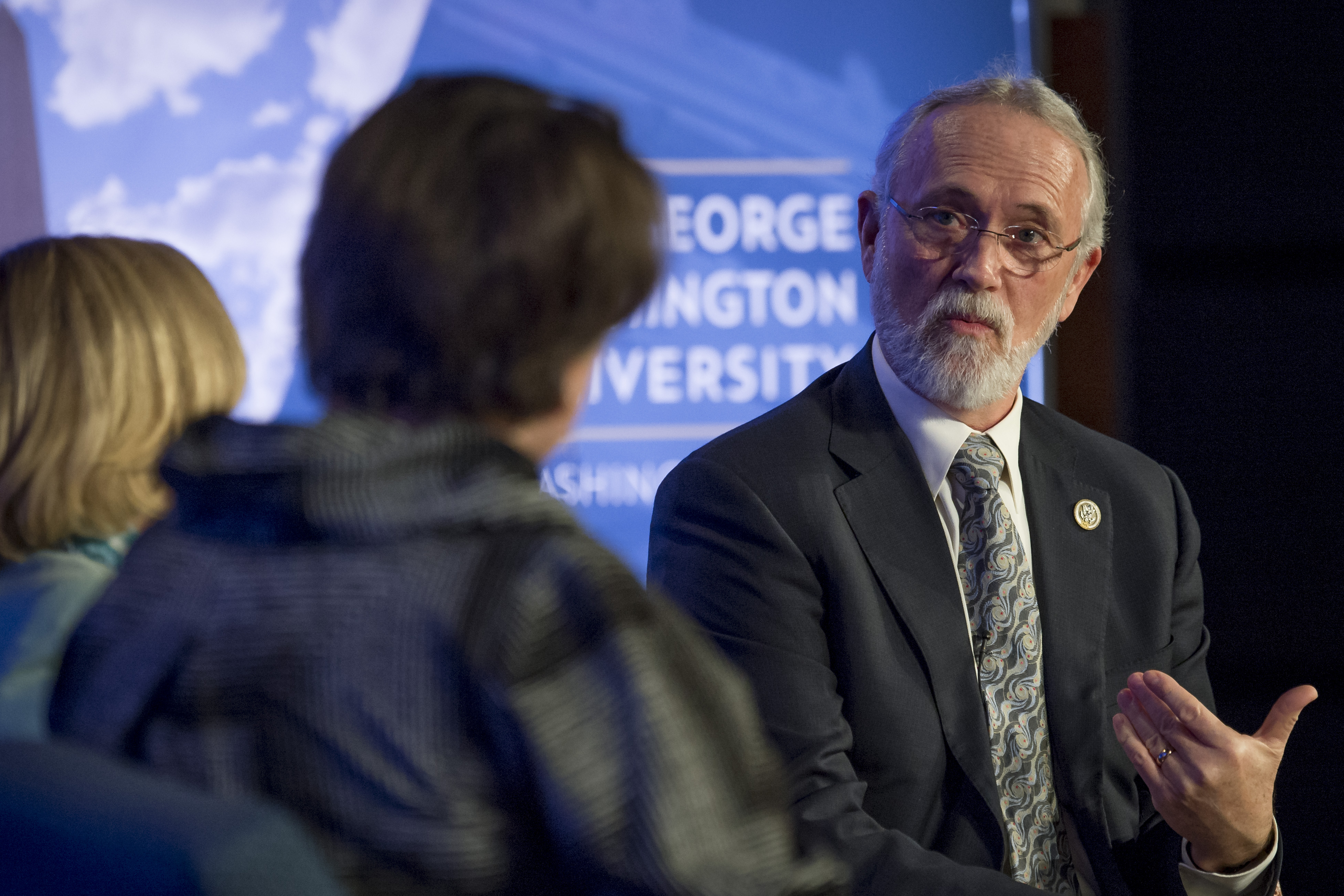
Newhouse in 2017

Although he had voted against impeachment in the first impeachment of Donald Trump, Newhouse announced his support for the second impeachment of Donald Trump on January 13, 2021, after the storming of the United States Capitol. In a statement, Newhouse condemned the "hateful and anti-American extremists" who attacked the Capitol, saying that they had been incited by "the language and misinformation of the President of the United States." He claimed that he could not appear to condone the "unacceptable violence" or Trump's "inaction" by voting against impeachment, saying that Trump "failed to fulfill his oath of office" by not responding sooner. He voted to impeach alongside nine other Republicans that day. In his speech supporting impeachment, Newhouse said that while the article charging Trump with incitement of insurrection was "flawed", he also believed there was "no excuse" for Trump's failure to act. He expressed regret for not speaking out sooner against Trump's spreading of election misinformation. Earlier, he told The Spokesman-Review that while he was a Trump supporter, he believed Trump "let us down" by not doing more to stop the violence.

On May 19, 2021, Newhouse became one of 35 Republicans who joined all Democrats in voting to approve legislation to establish the January 6 commission meant to investigate the storming of the U.S. Capitol.

In 2025, Newhouse reported a major increase in constituent calls to his DC office, and citizens have called for him to host town halls in response to DOGE cuts and Trump's federal funding freeze. A protest against Medicaid cuts routed to his Yakima office, and more than 200 people showed up to his staff's office hours in Twisp. Newhouse has expressed support for cuts, but criticized cuts to agricultural programs.

On December 17, 2025, Newhouse announced he will not seek a seventh term in the 2026 elections.

=== Political positions ===
==== Agriculture ====
In September 2024, Newhouse led a letter by 11 House Republicans calling on Director of National Intelligence Avril Haines to conduct an analysis of Chinese biotechnology development, including in cultivated meat, and issue recommendations for the United States to promote innovation in the alternative proteins sector. The letter stated that U.S. leadership on biotechnology and alternative proteins, including cultivated meat, is critical for U.S. food security.

==== LGBT rights ====
On July 19, 2022, Newhouse and 46 other House Republicans voted for the Respect for Marriage Act, which codified the right to same-sex marriage in federal law.

==== Immigration ====
In 2019, Newhouse voted for the Consolidated Appropriations Act (H.R. 1158), which effectively prohibits ICE from cooperating with Health and Human Services to detain or remove illegal alien sponsors of unaccompanied alien children (UACs).

In 2019, Newhouse voted for the Further Consolidated Appropriations Act of 2020, which authorized DHS to nearly double the available H-2B visas for the remainder of FY 2020.

In 2021, Newhouse was one of 30 Republicans who voted for the Farm Workforce Modernization Act, which would grant legal status to certain illegal immigrants working in agriculture and establish a pathway to permanent residency contingent on continued farm work.

In 2026, Newhouse was a cosponsor of the DIGNIDAD Act, which proposes a pathway to legal status for up to 12 million illegal immigrants, paired with stricter border enforcement and mandatory work and restitution requirements.

==== Ukraine ====
In 2022, Newhouse voted to provide approximately $14 billion in military aid to the government of Ukraine.

=== Caucus memberships ===
- Congressional Western Caucus (Chair)
- Congressional Caucus on Turkey and Turkish Americans
- Republican Main Street Partnership
- Republican Study Committee
- U.S.-Japan Caucus
- Republican Governance Group

== Personal life ==
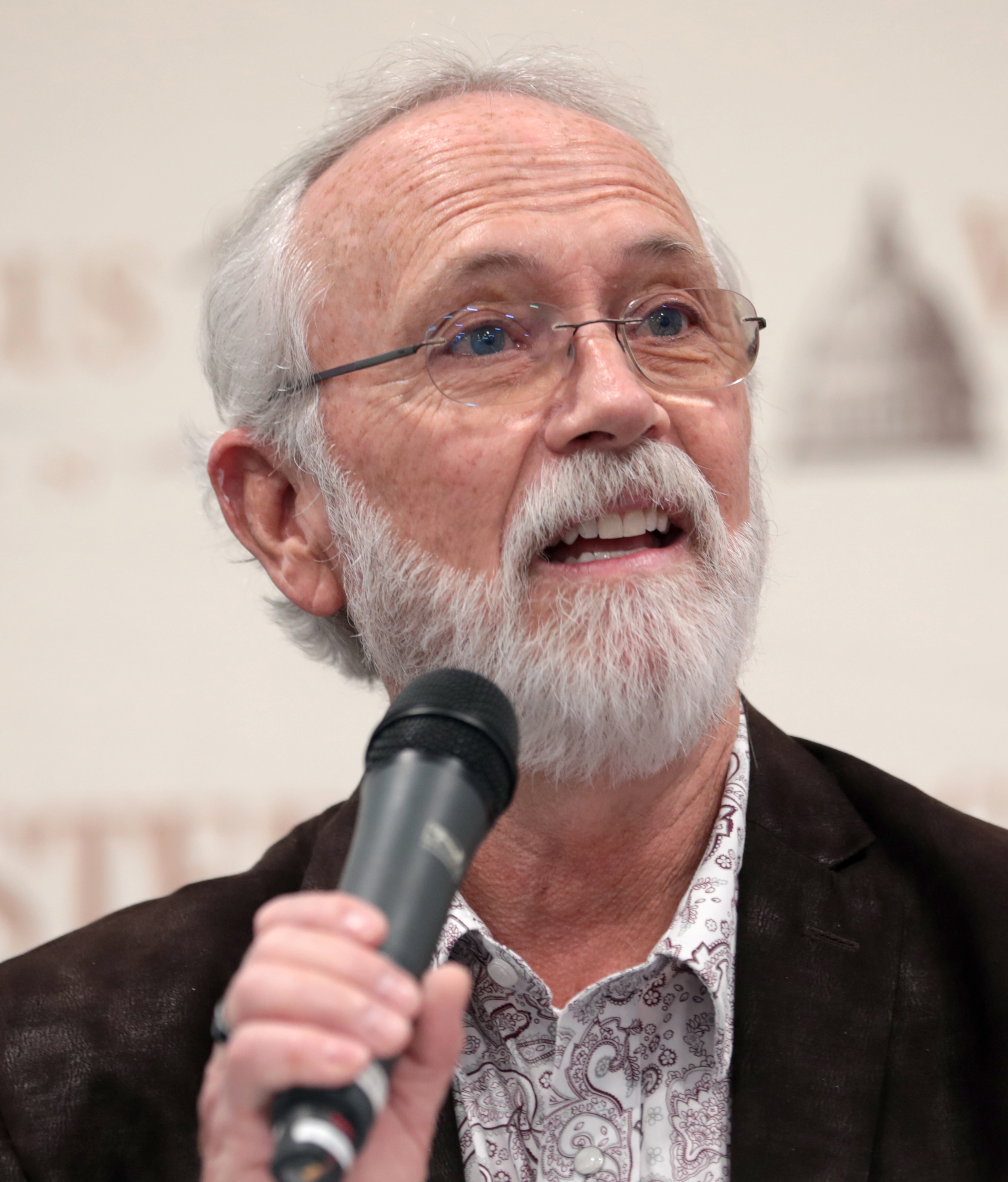
Newhouse in 2022

Newhouse owns a 600-acre (240 ha) farm in Sunnyside that produces hops, tree fruit, grapes, and alfalfa. His first wife, Carol, died of cancer in 2017. They have two adult children.

In 2018, Newhouse married Joan Galvin in a small ceremony at the Congressional Prayer Room in the United States Capitol building.

Newhouse is a Presbyterian.

== Electoral history ==
=== 2014 ===
Washington's 4th congressional district (2014)
Party	Candidate	Votes	%
Republican	Dan Newhouse*	77,772	50.8
Republican	Clint Didier	75,307	49.2
Total votes		153,079	100.00

=== 2016 ===
Washington's 4th congressional district (2016)
Party	Candidate	Votes	%
Republican	Dan Newhouse*	132,517	57.6
Republican	Clint Didier	97,402	42.4
Total votes		229,919	100.00

=== 2018 ===
Washington's 4th congressional district (2018)
Party	Candidate	Votes	%
Republican	Dan Newhouse*	141,551	62.8
Democratic	Christine Brown	83,785	37.2
Total votes		225,336	100.00

=== 2020 ===
Washington's 4th congressional district (2020)
Party	Candidate	Votes	%
Republican	Dan Newhouse*	202,108	66.2
Democratic	Douglas E. McKinley	102,667	33.6
Write-in		488	0.16
Total votes		305,263	100.00

=== 2022 ===
2022 blanket primary results
Party	Candidate	Votes	%
Republican	Dan Newhouse (incumbent)	38,331	25.5
Democratic	Doug White	37,760	25.1
Republican	Loren Culp	32,497	21.6
Republican	Jerrod Sessler	18,495	12.3
Republican	Brad Klippert	15,430	10.3
Republican	Corey Gibson	5,080	3.4
Republican	Benancio Garcia III	2,148	1.4
Republican	Jacek Kobiesa	490	0.3
Total votes		150,231	100.0

Washington's 4th congressional district (2022)
Party	Candidate	Votes	%
Republican	Dan Newhouse*	150,619	66.5
Democratic	Doug White	70,710	31.2
Write-in		5,318	2.3
Total votes		226,647	100.00

=== 2024 ===
2024 blanket primary results
Party	Candidate	Votes	%
Republican	Jerrod Sessler	51,020	33.1
Republican	Dan Newhouse (incumbent)	36,073	23.4
Republican	Tiffany Smiley	29,761	19.3
Democratic	Mary Baechler	22,353	14.5
Democratic	"Birdie" Jane Muchlinski	9,593	6.2
Democratic	Barry Knowles	3,329	2.2
Independent	Benny "BG3" Garcia	1,389	0.9
MAGA Democrat Party	John Malan	711	0.5
Write-in		98	0.1
Total votes		154,327	100.0

2024 general election results
Party	Candidate	Votes	%
Republican	Dan Newhouse (incumbent)	153,477	52.0
Republican	Jerrod Sessler	136,175	46.2
Write-in		5,400	1.8
Total votes		295,052	100.0

U.S. House of Representatives
Preceded by Doc Hastings	Member of the U.S. House of Representatives from Washington's 4th congressional district 2015–present	Incumbent
U.S. order of precedence (ceremonial)
Preceded by Seth Moulton	United States representatives by seniority 141st	Succeeded by Gary Palmer
