= Cooper Kupp =

American football player (born 1993)

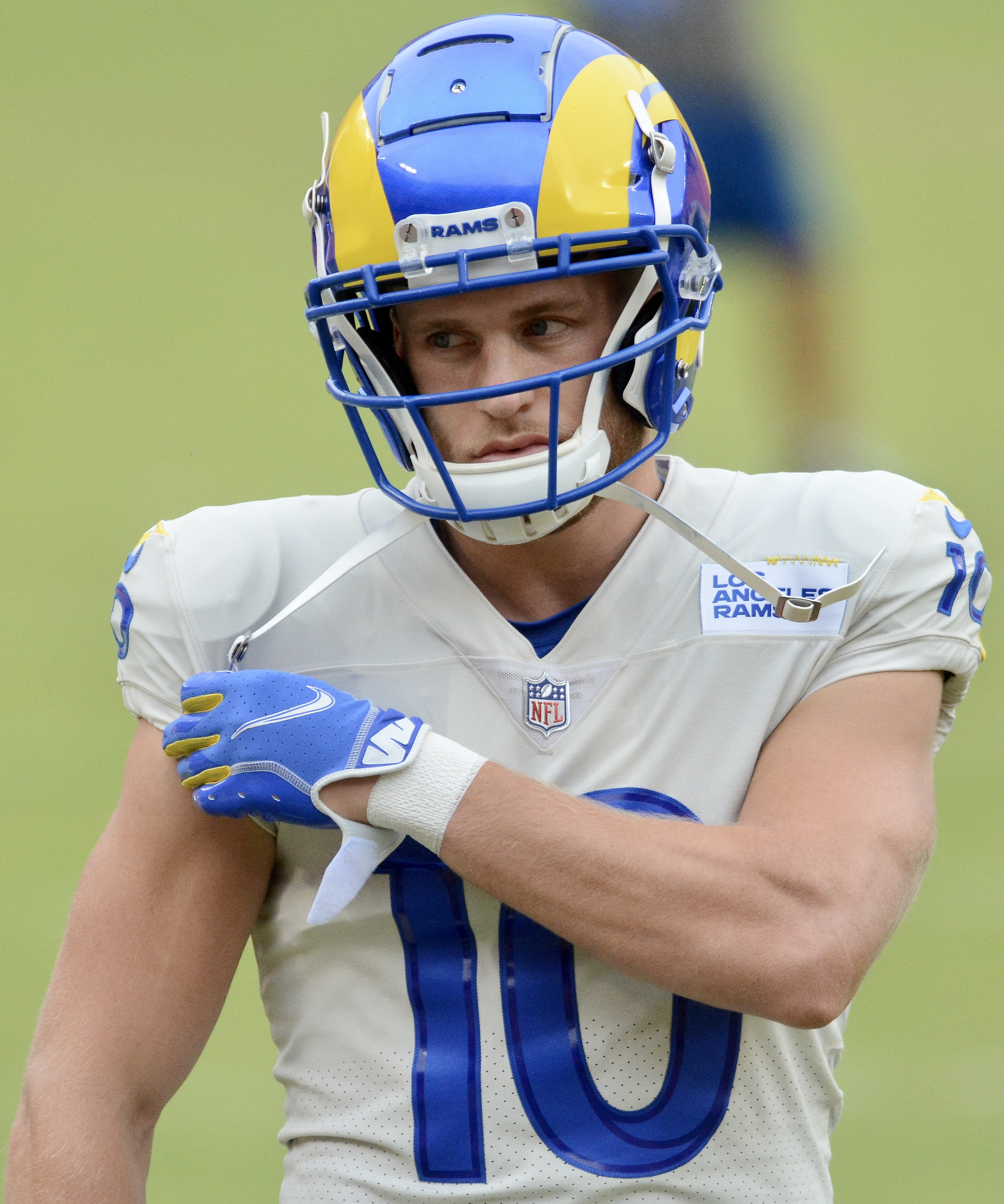
- Kupp with the Los Angeles Rams in 2020

No. 10 – Seattle Seahawks
- Position: Wide receiver
- Roster status: Active

Personal information
- Born: June 15, 1993 (age 33); Yakima, Washington, U.S.
- Listed height: 6 ft 2 in (1.88 m)
- Listed weight: 205 lb (93 kg)

Career information
- High school: A.C. Davis (Yakima)
- College: Eastern Washington (2012–2016)
- NFL draft: 2017: 3rd round, 69th overall pick

Career history
- Los Angeles Rams (2017–2024); Seattle Seahawks (2025–present)

Awards and highlights
- 2× Super Bowl champion (LVI, LX); Super Bowl MVP (LVI); NFL Offensive Player of the Year (2021); First-team All-Pro (2021); Pro Bowl (2021); NFL receptions leader (2021); NFL receiving yards leader (2021); NFL receiving touchdowns leader (2021); PFWA All-Rookie Team (2017); Walter Payton Award (2015); Jerry Rice Award (2013); 2× Big Sky Offensive Player of the Year (2015, 2016); 4× First-team FCS All-American (2013–2016); NFL records: Most yards from scrimmage by a wide receiver in a single season (1,965); Most receptions in a single postseason (33); NCAA (FCS) records: All-division career leader in receiving yards: 6,464; Most career receptions: 428 (FCS); Most consecutive games with a reception: 52 (FCS); Highest career receiving yards average per game: 124.3 (FCS); Most career games with 100 receiving yards: 29 (FCS); Most career receiving touchdowns: 73 (FCS)

Career NFL statistics as of Week 10, 2026
- Receptions: 704
- Receiving yards: 8,641
- Receiving touchdowns: 62
- Stats at Pro Football Reference

Cooper Douglas Kupp (born June 15, 1993) is an American professional football wide receiver for the Seattle Seahawks of the National Football League (NFL). He played college football for the Eastern Washington Eagles, winning the Walter Payton Award in 2015 and setting the NCAA Division I Football Championship Subdivision records for receptions, receiving yards, and receiving touchdowns. He was selected by the Los Angeles Rams in the third round of the 2017 NFL draft.

Kupp had a breakout season in 2021 when he became the fourth player since the AFL-NFL Merger to lead the league in receptions, receiving yards, and receiving touchdowns. He was named the Offensive Player of the Year and was the MVP of Super Bowl LVI. Kupp joined the Seahawks in 2025, winning Super Bowl LX the same season.

== Early life ==
Cooper Douglas Kupp was born June 15, 1993, in Yakima, Washington, United States. He is the grandson of Jake Kupp, an NFL offensive lineman, and the son of Craig Kupp, an NFL quarterback. His family is one of only five in NFL history to have three generations selected in the NFL draft.

Kupp attended and graduated from Davis High School in Yakima in 2012 where he was a two-sport athlete in football and basketball for the Pirates athletic teams. A two-way All-State selection, he earned first-team 4A All-State honors as a defensive back and honorable mention accolades as a wide receiver from the Associated Press, as selected by sportswriters and broadcasters. Kupp was also named by the Seattle Times as a "White Chip" selection, as one of the top 100 prospects in the state of Washington.

Kupp was a unanimous first-team All-Columbia Basin Big Nine League wide receiver and defensive back at Davis. He finished his senior season with 60 receptions for 1,059 yards (17.7 per catch) and 18 touchdowns and scored 22 total touchdowns to set a school record. Kupp also had 11 rushes for 122 yards and two touchdowns as he helped Davis come one game away from a berth in the Washington State 4A Playoffs.

Kupp finished his prep career without a single college football scholarship offer despite recording 110 catches for 2,100 yards. Three weeks after the final game of his senior season, he received his first scholarship offer to play for Eastern Washington, followed shortly thereafter by an offer from Idaho State.

Kupp was also a three-year letter-winner in basketball. He led Davis to a 23–2 record and won the State 4A Tournament championship during his senior year for the Pirates.

== College career ==
Kupp attended Eastern Washington University, where he signed to play for coach Beau Baldwin's Eastern Washington Eagles football team in 2012 and redshirted that year. Kupp would eventually be named Eastern's Offensive Scout Team Player of the Year.

=== 2013 season ===
In 2013, Kupp entered his redshirt freshman year as a starter at wide receiver. He finished the season having set numerous single-season school and national receiving records at the Football Championship Subdivision Level. Kupp has set national freshman records for receiving yards (1,691), total touchdown catches (21), consecutive games with a touchdown catch (14), and receptions (93).

On November 26, 2013, Kupp was named to the All-Big Sky Conference First-team as a unanimous selection and was also the recipient of the conference's first-ever Freshman of the Year Award.

On December 16, 2013, Kupp was named the recipient of the 2013 Jerry Rice Award, given to the top freshman player in the FCS. Kupp is the first Eastern Washington player and the first player from the Big Sky Conference to receive the award.

Kupp was named a consensus first-team All-American, having been honored by the four major selectors at the FCS level, consisting of the American Football Coaches Association, the Associated Press, The Sports Network and the Walter Camp Football Foundation. Kupp was the first freshman wide receiver to be named as a first-team All-American since Randy Moss in 1996.

On January 9, 2014, Kupp was honored by the College Football Performance Awards with the 2013 FCS Wide Receiver Award. Kupp is the second straight Eagles wide receiver to win the award, following Brandon Kaufman, who won the 2012 award.

=== 2014 season ===
Kupp finished his sophomore season with 104 catches for 1,431 yards and 16 touchdowns in 13 games. He was named a First-team All-American by the AFCA, AP, and TSN for the second consecutive season. He was also named to the first-team All-Big Sky for the second straight year as a wide receiver while also earning third-team honors as punt returner. Kupp finished 18th in the 2014 Walter Payton Award voting.

=== 2015 season ===
In the 2015 season, Kupp finished the season with 114 catches for 1,642 yards and 19 touchdowns in 11 games. He broke the Big Sky single-season record for catches with 114, a total that ranks ninth most all-time in FCS single-season history. Kupp was named a first-team All-Big Sky wide receiver for the third-straight year and was also named the league's Offensive Most Valuable Player. He was just the second wide receiver to be named Big Sky Offensive MVP in the last 42 years. Kupp also won the Walter Payton Award, becoming the third Eastern Washington player to win the award and only the second wide receiver to win, after Brian Finneran of Villanova in 1997.

=== 2016 season ===
On November 30, 2015, Kupp announced that he would return for his senior season after speculation that he was considering entering the 2016 NFL draft. He was poised to break nearly every major FCS career receiving record mark during his final collegiate season. In the 2016 season, Kupp finished with 117 receptions for 1,700 yards and 17 touchdowns. At the end of his college career, Kupp's 428 receptions and 6,464 yards were both the most in FCS history, passing marks previously held by Terrell Hudgins, who had 395 receptions and 5,250 yards playing for Elon University from 2006 to 2009. Moreover, Kupp's 6,464 yards eclipsed Scott Pingel's all-division NCAA record set in 1999, which was accomplished at the Division III level of competition. Kupp's 73 receiving touchdowns also rank first in FCS history, passing the 58 touchdowns that New Hampshire's David Ball caught from 2003 to 2006.

== Professional career ==
=== Pre-draft ===
Kupp attended the 2017 Senior Bowl and made two receptions for 14 yards for the North, who lost 16–15 to the South. Kupp's performance at the Senior Bowl elevated his draft stock. NFL analyst Bucky Brooks stated Kupp was the top performer at the Senior Bowl. He attended the NFL Scouting Combine in Indianapolis and completed all the combine drills except for the bench press.

External videos
- Brooks "Kupp was the top performer"
- Cooper Kupp's NFL Combine Workout
- Cooper Kupp runs the 40-yard dash
- Smith: Kupp is my #1

On March 28, 2017, Kupp opted to participate in Eastern Washington's pro day along with Jordan West, Shaq Hill, Samson Ebukam, Kendrick Bourne, and Miquiyah Zamora. He attempted all of the combine drills but opted to skip the bench press and broad jump. Kupp shortened his time in the short shuttle to 6.53s and performed positional drills for scouts and team representatives. At the conclusion of the pre-draft process, Kupp was projected to be a second or third-round pick by NFL draft experts and scouts. He was ranked the eighth-best wide receiver in the draft by NFLDraftScout.com. Steve Smith Sr. ranked him as the best wide receiver in the draft class.

Pre-draft measurables
Height	Weight	Arm length	Hand span	Wingspan	40-yard dash	10-yard split	20-yard split	20-yard shuttle	Three-cone drill	Vertical jump	Broad jump	Wonderlic
6 ft 1 5/8 in (1.87 m)	203 lb (92 kg)	31 1/2 in (0.80 m)	9 1/2 in (0.24 m)	6 ft 2 in (1.88 m)	4.62 s	1.55 s	2.69 s	4.08 s	6.53 s	31.0 in (0.79 m)	9 ft 8 in (2.95 m)	37
All values from NFL Combine/Pro Day

External videos
- Rams draft Cooper Kupp 69th overall
- Mayock "Kupp has great hands and speed"

=== Los Angeles Rams ===
==== 2017 season ====
The Los Angeles Rams selected Kupp in the third round (69th overall) of the 2017 NFL draft. He was the seventh wide receiver drafted in 2017 and became the second highest pick in Eastern Washington's school history, only behind Michael Roos who was taken by the Tennessee Titans in the 2005 NFL draft (second round, 41st overall). Kupp was reunited with Eastern Washington teammate Samson Ebukam after the Rams selected him in the fourth round (125th overall). On June 9, 2017, the Rams signed Kupp to a four-year, $3.83 million contract that included a signing bonus of $954,760.

Kupp competed with Sammy Watkins, Tavon Austin, Robert Woods, Mike Thomas, Bradley Marquez, Pharoh Cooper, and Josh Reynolds throughout training camp for a starting wide receiver role left vacant after Kenny Britt departed in free agency. Head coach Sean McVay named Kupp the fourth wide receiver on the depth chart behind Watkins, Woods, and Austin.

Kupp made his NFL debut in the season-opening 46–9 victory over the Indianapolis Colts and recorded four receptions for 76 yards, including an 18-yard touchdown pass from Jared Goff, marking the first of his career. Three weeks later, Kupp had five catches for 60 yards and a touchdown in a 35–30 road victory over the Dallas Cowboys. During a Week 7 33–0 shutout victory in London against the Arizona Cardinals, he caught four passes for 51 yards and a touchdown.

Through the first seven games of the season, Kupp led the Rams in red-zone targets with 11 and developed as Goff's top receiver in the red zone and third downs. Kupp was fourth in the entire NFL in red zone targets behind leaders Davante Adams, Larry Fitzgerald, and Dez Bryant who were tied with 20 red zone targets each. During a Week 9 51–17 victory over the New York Giants, Kupp made his first career NFL start, catching three passes for 54 yards. Three weeks later against the New Orleans Saints, Kupp posted his first career game with over 100 yards, where he finished with 116 as the Rams won 26–20. During a Week 14 43–35 loss to the Philadelphia Eagles, he finished with five receptions for 118 yards and a touchdown. By December, Kupp was a full-time starter at wide receiver and ended his rookie season in 2017 with 62 receptions for 869 yards and five touchdowns in 15 games and six starts.

The Rams finished atop the NFC West with an 11–5 record. On January 6, 2018, Kupp appeared in his first career playoff game and had eight receptions for 69 yards and a touchdown as the Rams lost by a score of 26–13 to the Atlanta Falcons in an National Football Conference (NFC) Wild Card Game at the Los Angeles Memorial Coliseum.

Following the season, Kupp was also named to the 2017 All-Rookie Team by the Pro Football Writers Association.

==== 2018 season ====
Kupp was named a starting wide receiver in 2018 alongside Robert Woods and offseason acquisition Brandin Cooks. During a Week 4 38–31 victory over the Minnesota Vikings, Kupp caught nine passes for 162 yards and two touchdowns (all single-game highs), including a career-best 70-yard scoring reception. In the next game against the Denver Broncos, he sustained a knee injury and was carted off the field. Though Kupp returned to the field in the third quarter of the Rams' 23–20 victory, he was pulled out of the lineup and missed the next two games. During the fourth quarter of a Week 10 36–31 victory over the Seattle Seahawks, Kupp went down with a non-contact injury. An MRI the following day confirmed that he tore his ACL, prematurely ending his season.

Kupp finished the season with 40 receptions for 566 yards and six touchdowns through eight games and starts. Without Kupp, the Rams reached Super Bowl LIII where they lost 13–3 to the New England Patriots.

==== 2019 season ====
Kupp returned from his injury in time for the Rams' season opener against the Carolina Panthers. Over the first seven games of the season, he had at least 100 yards in four games and scored four total touchdowns. During a 24–10 Week 8 victory over the Cincinnati Bengals in London, Kupp caught seven receptions for 220 yards and a touchdown, marking the first time in his NFL career where he had over 200 yards in a single game. Kupp's performance set an NFL record most receiving yards in an international NFL game. From Weeks 13–17, Kupp scored a receiving touchdown in five consecutive games.

Kupp finished the 2019 season with 94 receptions for 1,161 yards and 10 touchdowns in 16 games and 14 starts. He led the team in receptions, receiving yards, and receiving touchdowns. Kupp and his teammate Robert Woods gave the Rams a 1,000-yard receiving duo. Kupp's ten receiving touchdowns tied with Mark Andrews for the second most in the NFL in 2019. He was ranked 89th by his fellow players on the NFL Top 100 Players of 2020.

==== 2020 season ====
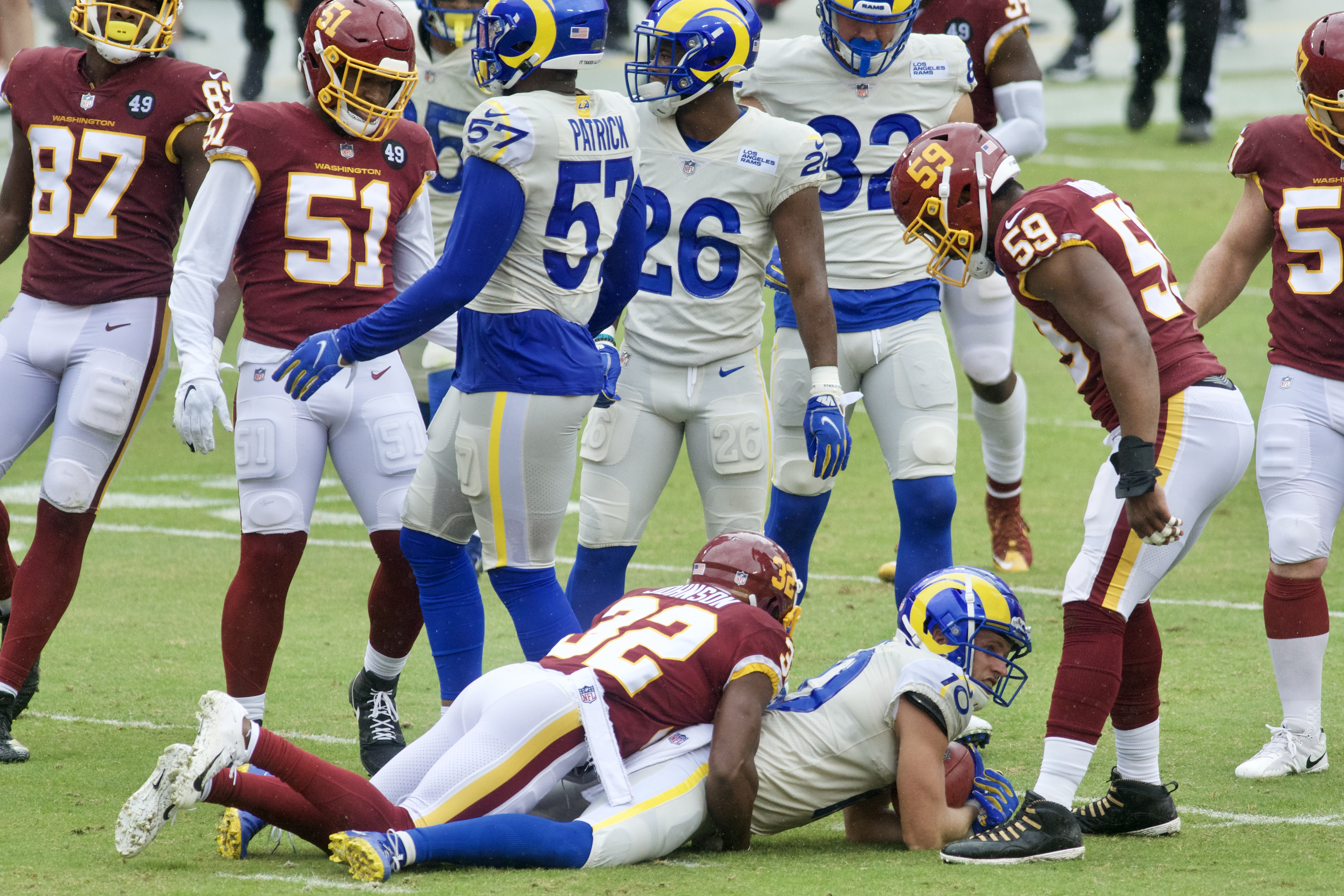
Kupp after being tackled during a game against the Washington Commanders in 2020

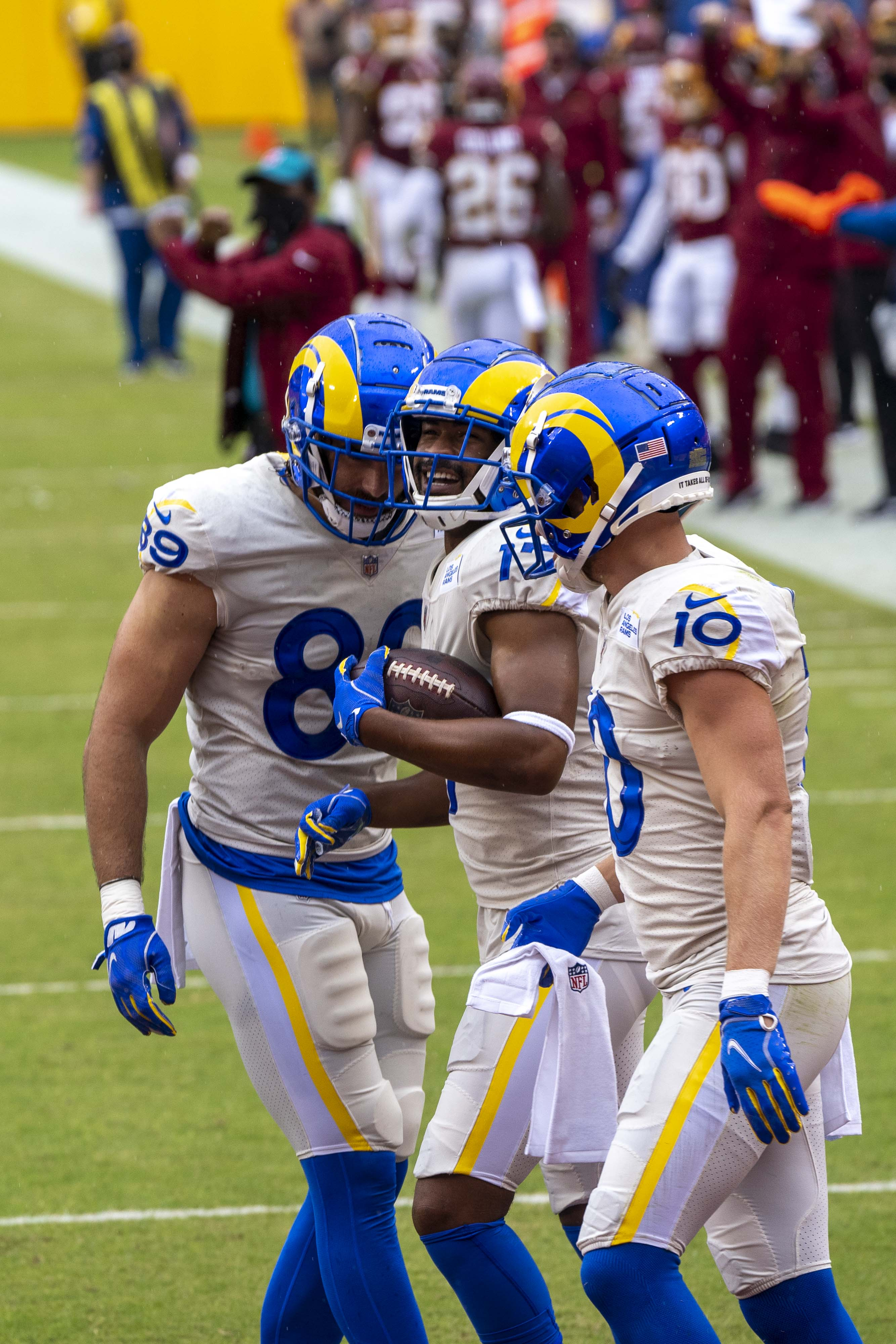
Kupp with Tyler Higbee and Robert Woods in 2020

After wearing number 18 for his first three seasons in the NFL, Kupp switched jersey numbers to number 10, his collegiate number at Eastern Washington. On September 12, 2020, Kupp signed a three-year, $48 million contract extension with the Rams, including $35.1 million guaranteed.

Kupp was placed on the reserve/COVID-19 list by the Rams on December 29, 2020, which forced him out of Week 17. He was activated on January 6, 2021. Kupp played in the Wild Card Round as the Rams defeated the Seahawks on the road by a score of 30–20, but he suffered a knee injury, which kept him out of the Divisional Round to the Green Bay Packers, which the Rams lost on the road by a score of 32–18.

Kupp finished the 2020 season with 92 receptions for 974 yards and three touchdowns in 15 games and 12 starts. He recorded three games with at least 100 yards. Kupp led the team in receptions and receiving yards for the season.

==== 2021 season: Triple Crown and Super Bowl MVP ====
Kupp's performance throughout the 2021 season was one of the greatest statistical receiving seasons in NFL history. With the addition of Matthew Stafford in the offseason, Kupp started the season on a high note. Over the season's first three games, Kupp totaled 25 receptions for 367 yards and five touchdowns in victories for the Rams. Included in that stretch was a season-high 163-yard, two-touchdown performance against the Colts. Kupp was held to season lows in receptions (five) and yardage (64) in the Rams' 37–20 loss to the visiting Cardinals, but he bounced back with seven receptions for 92 yards in a 26–17 road victory over the Seahawks. In Weeks 6–7, Kupp had nine receptions for 130 yards and ten receptions for 156 yards while getting two touchdowns in both games against the Giants and Detroit Lions. Kupp ended the season with a very productive six-game stretch from Weeks 13–18, averaging 118.3 yards per game and six total touchdowns. In that stretch, Kupp reached 5,000 career receiving yards in Week 14 against the Cardinals.

In the Rams' 12–5 season, Kupp set numerous franchise single-season receiving records, which resulted in Pro Bowl and First-team All-Pro honors. He was named NFC Offensive Player of the Month for both September and October. Kupp's 145 receptions for 1,947 yards were both franchise records, and his 16 touchdowns finished second to Elroy Hirsch's 17 in 1951. For the 2021 season, Kupp earned the receiving triple crown, becoming the first player since Steve Smith Sr. in 2005 to lead the league in receptions, receiving touchdowns, and receiving yards. Kupp's 1,947 yards finished second in NFL history to Calvin Johnson's 1,964 in 2012, while his 145 receptions were second only to Michael Thomas' 149 in 2019.

In the Wild Card Round against the Cardinals, Kupp had five receptions for 61 yards and a touchdown in the 34–11 victory. In the Divisional Round, he recorded nine receptions for 183 yards and a touchdown in the narrow 30–27 road victory over the Tampa Bay Buccaneers. Kupp had a pivotal 44-yard reception to help set up the Rams' game-winning field goal. In the NFC Championship Game against the San Francisco 49ers, he recorded 11 receptions for 142 yards and two touchdowns in the 20–17 victory, bringing the Rams back to the Super Bowl for the second time since 2018. In Super Bowl LVI, against the Bengals, Kupp scored his first career Super Bowl touchdown, an 11-yard reception. In the fourth quarter game-winning drive, Kupp ran for seven yards on a critical 4th-and-1 play, and he and quarterback Matthew Stafford connected on multiple successful catches, including the game-winning touchdown which led to his selection as Super Bowl MVP. Kupp's 33 receptions over four playoff games set a new NFL record for a single postseason, while his 478 yards and six touchdowns ranked second in league playoff history behind Cardinals receiver Larry Fitzgerald. He was ranked fourth by his fellow players on the NFL Top 100 Players of 2022.

==== 2022 season ====
On June 9, 2022, Kupp signed a three-year, $80.1 million contract extension to remain with the Rams through 2026. The contract includes a $20 million signing bonus and $75 million guaranteed.

In the NFL Kickoff Game against the Buffalo Bills, Kupp caught 13 passes for 128 yards and a touchdown in the 31–10 loss. In the next game, he had 11 receptions for 108 yards and two touchdowns in the 31–27 victory over the Falcons. Two weeks later, Kupp recorded 14 receptions for 122 yards in a 24–9 road loss to the 49ers. During a Week 5 22–10 loss to the Cowboys, he had seven receptions for 125 yards and a touchdown.

During a Week 10 27–17 loss to the Cardinals, Kupp suffered a high ankle sprain, which required surgery. He was placed on injured reserve on November 15, 2022. Kupp finished the 2022 season with 75 receptions for 812 yards and six touchdowns in nine games and starts as the Rams finished with a 5–12 record. He was ranked 47th by his fellow players on the NFL Top 100 Players of 2023.

==== 2023 season ====
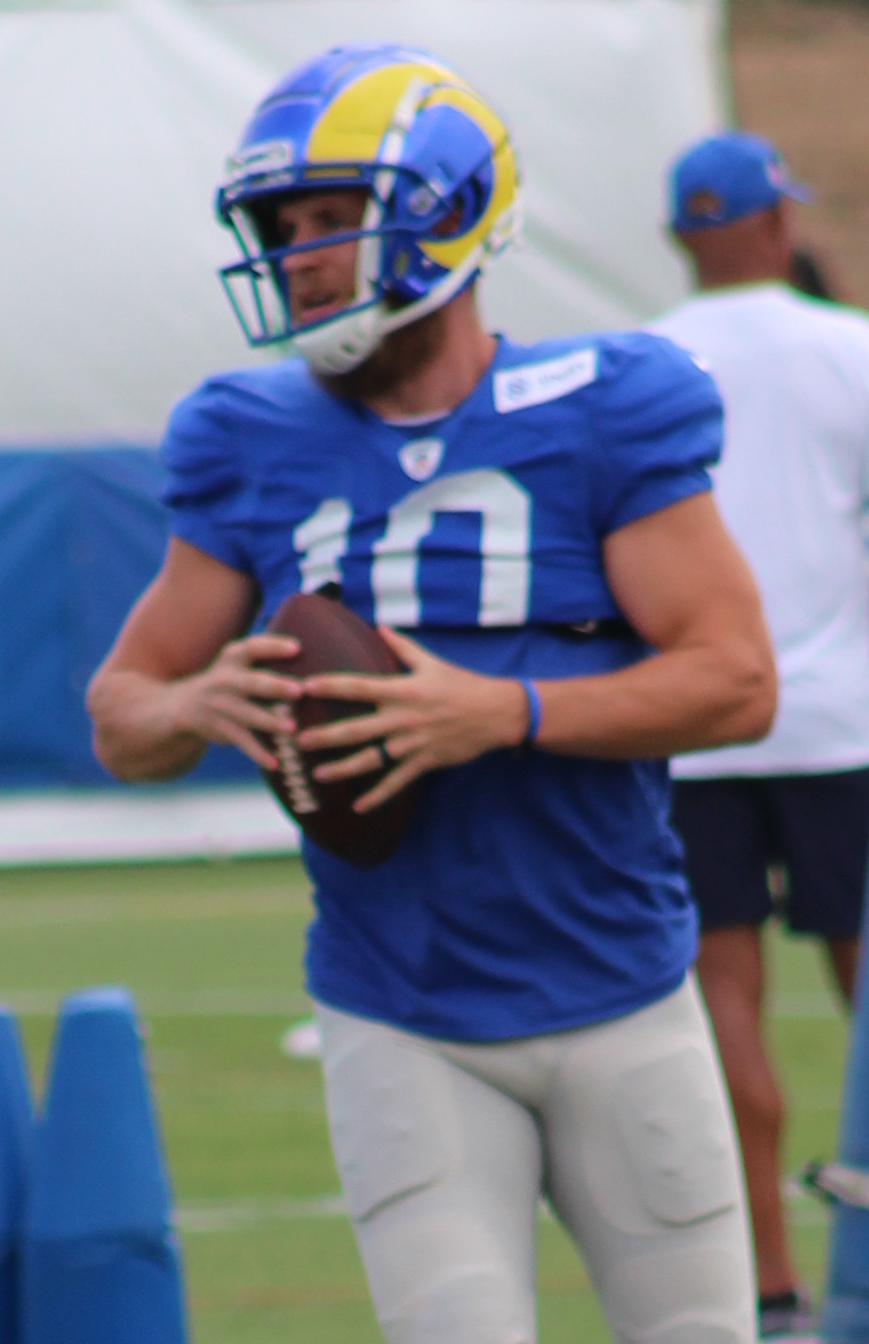
Kupp with the Rams in 2023

On September 9, 2023, Kupp was placed on injured reserve to begin the season due to a lingering hamstring injury. He was activated off injured reserve on October 7, ahead of the Rams' Week 5 game against the Eagles. In his return against the Eagles, he had eight receptions for 118 yards in the loss. In the following game, a victory over the Cardinals, he had seven receptions for 148 yards and a touchdown. In Week 14, in a close loss to the Ravens, he had eight receptions for 115 yards and a touchdown. In Week 15, a victory over the Commanders, he had eight receptions for 111 yards and a touchdown. In the 2023 season, he started in the 12 regular season games he appeared in. He had 59 receptions for 737 receiving yards and five receiving touchdowns as the Rams finished 10–7 and made the postseason. He was ranked 69th by his fellow players on the NFL Top 100 Players of 2024.

==== 2024 season ====
Kupp opened the season against the Detroit Lions with 14 receptions, tying his career high, along with 110 yards and a touchdown as the Rams lost in overtime. In Week 2 against the Cardinals, Kupp sustained an ankle injury during the second quarter and was ruled out for the remainder of the game. After being held out for four weeks, Kupp returned in Week 8 against the Minnesota Vikings and caught five passes for 51 yards and a touchdown in the Rams' 30–20 victory. A week later, Kupp caught 11 passes for 104 yards in the Rams' 26–20 overtime victory at Seattle. He also surpassed 600 receptions and moved into third place on the Rams franchise's all-time receptions list behind Isaac Bruce (942) and Torry Holt (869). Two weeks later, Kupp caught six receptions for 106 yards and two touchdowns in a 28–22 win at New England. The pair of scores vaulted Kupp past Hall of Famer Elroy Hirsch to third place for team career receiving touchdowns behind Bruce (84) and Holt (74). In a Week 15 matchup with the San Francisco 49ers, Kupp was held without a catch for only the third time in his professional career, a streak that had reached 69 consecutive games. He finished the 2024 season with 67 receptions for 710 yards and six receiving touchdowns.

On February 3, 2025, Kupp announced that the Rams' front office informed him that he was not in their future plans for the team and that they intended to trade him in 2025 offseason. The Rams could not find a trade partner for Kupp, which ultimately led to his release from the team on March 12.

=== Seattle Seahawks ===
On March 14, 2025, Kupp agreed to a three-year, $45 million contract with the Seattle Seahawks. Quickly establishing himself in the starting lineup, Kupp played in 16 games during the regular season, starting 15, and caught 47 passes for 593 yards and two touchdowns. In Week 2, Kupp had season highs in catches (seven) and yardage (90) in the Seahawks' 31–17 victory over the Pittsburgh Steelers. Kupp caught at least one pass in every game as he helped Seattle win the NFC West title for the first time since 2020. In the NFC Divisional Round, Kupp led the Seahawks with five receptions for 60 yards in Seattle's 41–6 rout of the San Francisco 49ers. In the NFC Championship, Kupp caught four passes for 36 yards, including a 13-yard touchdown in the third quarter that ultimately provided the winning margin in Seattle's 31–27 win over the Los Angeles Rams, gaining Kupp a measure of "revenge" against his former team. Kupp won his second Super Bowl championship when the Seahawks defeated the Patriots 29–13 in Super Bowl LX. He had six receptions for 61 yards in the game.

== Career statistics ==
Legend
	AP NFL Offensive Player of the Year
	Super Bowl MVP
	Won the Super Bowl
	NFL record
	Led the league
**Bold**	Career high

=== NFL ===
==== Regular season ====
Year	Team	Games		Receiving							Rushing					Fumbles	
Year	Team	GP	GS	Tgt	Rec	Yds	Y/R	Lng	TD	FD	Att	Yds	Y/A	Lng	TD	Fum	Lost
2017	LAR	15	6	94	62	869	14.0	64	5	42	0	0	0.0	0	0	1	**1**
2018	LAR	8	8	55	40	566	**14.2**	70	6	25	4	25	6.3	12	0	0	0
2019	LAR	16	14	134	94	1,161	12.4	66	10	51	2	4	2.0	6	0	**3**	0
2020	LAR	15	12	124	92	974	10.6	55	3	45	4	33	**8.3**	16	0	1	**1**
2021	LAR	17	17	**191**	**145**	**1,947**	13.4	59	**16**	**89**	4	18	4.5	18	0	0	0
2022	LAR	9	9	98	75	812	10.8	**75**	6	42	**9**	**52**	5.8	**20**	**1**	2	**1**
2023	LAR	12	12	95	59	737	12.5	62	5	33	1	−3	−3.0	−3	0	0	0
2024	LAR	12	11	100	67	710	10.6	69	6	28	2	10	5.0	9	0	1	0
2025	SEA	16	15	70	47	593	12.6	67	2	26	0	0	0.0	0	0	1	**1**
2026	SEA	10	5	35	23	272	11.8	34	3	16	0	0	0.0	0	0	0	0
Career		130	109	996	704	8,641	12.3	75	62	422	26	139	5.4	20	1	9	4

==== Postseason ====
Year	Team	Games		Receiving							Rushing					Fumbles	
Year	Team	GP	GS	Tgt	Rec	Yds	Y/R	Lng	TD	FD	Att	Yds	Y/A	Lng	TD	Fum	Lost
2017	LAR	1	0	13	8	69	8.6	15	1	4	0	—	—	—	—	0	—
2018	LAR	0	0	Did not play due to injury													
2020	LAR	1	1	9	4	78	**19.5**	44	0	3	0	—	—	—	—	0	—
2021	LAR	4	4	**42**	**33**	**478**	14.5	**70**	**6**	**19**	**2**	**5**	**2.5**	**7**	0	**1**	**1**
2023	LAR	1	1	9	5	27	5.4	7	0	2	0	—	—	—	—	0	—
2024	LAR	2	1	8	6	90	15.0	30	0	4	0	—	—	—	—	0	—
2025	SEA	3	3	23	15	157	10.5	23	1	8	0	—	—	—	—	0	—
Career		12	10	104	71	899	12.7	70	8	40	2	5	2.5	7	0	1	1

=== College ===
Season	Team	GP	Receiving						
Season	Team	GP	Rec	R/G	Yds	Y/G	Avg	Lng	TD
2012	Eastern Washington	0	Redshirt						
2013	Eastern Washington	15	93	6.2	1,691	112.7	**18.2**	63	**21**
2014	Eastern Washington	13	104	8.0	1,431	110.1	13.8	61	16
2015	Eastern Washington	11	114	**10.4**	1,642	**149.3**	14.4	**78**	19
2016	Eastern Washington	13	**117**	9.0	**1,700**	130.7	14.5	75	17
Total		52	428	8.4	6,464	125.7	14.9	78	73

== Career highlights ==
=== Awards and honors ===
NFL

- 2× Super Bowl champion (LVI, LX)
- Super Bowl MVP (LVI)
- NFL Offensive Player of the Year (2021)
- PFWA NFL Offensive Player of the Year Award (2021)
- First-team All-Pro (2021)
- Pro Bowl (2021)
- NFL receptions leader (2021)
- NFL receiving yards leader (2021)
- NFL receiving touchdowns leader (2021)
- Yards after catch leader: (2021)
- PFWA All-Rookie Team (2017)
- Ranked No. 89 in the NFL Top 100 Players of 2020
- Ranked No. 4 in the NFL Top 100 Players of 2022
- Ranked No. 47 in the NFL Top 100 Players of 2023
- Ranked No. 69 in the NFL Top 100 Players of 2024
- 2× NFC Offensive Player of the Month (2021 – September, October)

College

- College football all-division career leader in receiving yards (6,464)
- NCAA FCS career leader in receiving touchdowns (73) and receptions (428)
- Walter Payton Award (2015)
- STATS FCS Offensive Player of the Year (2015)
- Jerry Rice Award (2013)
- 2× Big Sky Conference Offensive Player of the Year (2015–16)
- Big Sky Conference Freshman of the Year (2013)
- 2× College Football Performance Awards FCS Wide Receiver Award (2013, 2015)
- 4× First-team FCS All-American (AFCA, AP, STATS) (2013–16)
- 3× First-team FCS All-American (WCFF) (2013, 15–16)
- 2× First-team Division I Academic All-American (CoSIDA) (2015–16)
- Second-team Division I Academic All-American (CoSIDA) (2014)
- 4× First-team All-Big Sky Conference Wide Receiver (2013–16)
- Second-team All-Big Sky Conference Punt Returner (2016)
- Third-team All-Big Sky Conference Punt Returner (2014)

=== Records ===
==== NFL records ====
- Most receptions through first 100 games – 625
- Most yards from scrimmage by a wide receiver in a single season – 1,965 (2021)
- Most consecutive games with 90+ receiving yards – 13 (2021)
- Most games with 90+ receiving yards in a single season – 16 (2021)
- Most receptions in a single postseason – 33 (2021)

==== Los Angeles Rams franchise records ====
- Most receptions in a single season – 145 (2021)
- Most receiving yards in a single season – 1,947 (2021)

== Personal life ==
Kupp is the son of former NFL quarterback Craig Kupp, a fifth-round draft pick by the New York Giants in 1990 out of Pacific Lutheran University who played for the Phoenix Cardinals and the Dallas Cowboys in 1991. His younger brother, Ketner, also played at Eastern Washington and was signed by the Los Angeles Rams as a free agent in 2019, participating in training camp and in preseason games, but was released during the final roster cutdown.

His grandfather, Jake Kupp, was an offensive lineman for the University of Washington and was selected in the ninth round of the 1964 NFL draft by the Dallas Cowboys. He played from 1964 to 1975 as a guard with Dallas, the Washington Redskins, Atlanta Falcons, and the New Orleans Saints. Named to the NFL All-Rookie team, he later was a five-time captain for the Saints. He was named to the franchise's 25-year All-Time Team and was inducted into the New Orleans Saints Hall of Fame in 1991.

Kupp developed a close friendship with former Rams quarterback Jared Goff while living with him for a few weeks after the draft. They practiced on their own time together, watched films, studied defensive schemes, and learned the playbook.

Kupp has been described as a devout Christian.

As a senior in high school, Kupp met his girlfriend and future wife Anna Croskrey. They married in June 2015 and have three sons. When Kupp played for Los Angeles, he and his family lived in Westlake Village, California, during the season and Wilsonville, Oregon, during the offseason.

As part of a pregame ritual, Kupp is responsible for finding a Vietnamese restaurant to bring pho for his teammates Sam Darnold, Drew Lock, and Jalen Milroe the night before the team dinner of a road game. The quarterbacks rank and review Kupp's choices after they've finished reviewing the call sheet.

== See also ==
- List of third-generation National Football league players
