= Irv Newhouse =

American politician (1920–2001)

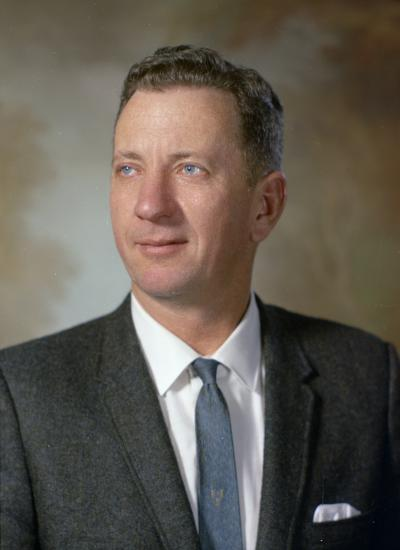
- Official portrait, 1967

Minority Leader of the Washington House of Representatives
- In office January 13, 1975 – January 10, 1977
- Preceded by: Thomas A. Swayze Jr.
- Succeeded by: Duane Berentson

Member of the Washington Senate from the 15th district
- In office December 9, 1980 – January 11, 1999
- Preceded by: Sid Morrison
- Succeeded by: Jim Honeyford

Member of the Washington House of Representatives from the 15th district
- In office January 11, 1965 – December 9, 1980
- Preceded by: Cecil C. Clark
- Succeeded by: Lyle J. Dickie

Personal details
- Born: Irving Ralph Newhouse; October 16, 1920 Sunnyside, Washington, U.S.
- Died: March 29, 2001 (aged 80) Sunnyside, Washington, U.S.
- Party: Republican
- Spouse: Ruth Newhouse
- Children: 6, including Dan
- Occupation: Farmer

Irving R. Newhouse Building, built in 2024.

Irving Ralph Newhouse (October 16, 1920 – March 29, 2001) was an American farmer and politician in the state of Washington. He served in the Washington House of Representatives from 1965 to 1980 and in the Senate from 1980 to 1999. He raised hops near Mabton and died in Sunnyside, Washington at the age of 80.

He was the father of U.S. representative Dan Newhouse. The building housing Washington State Senate offices is named for him.
