= Sunnyside, Washington =

Sunnyside
- City
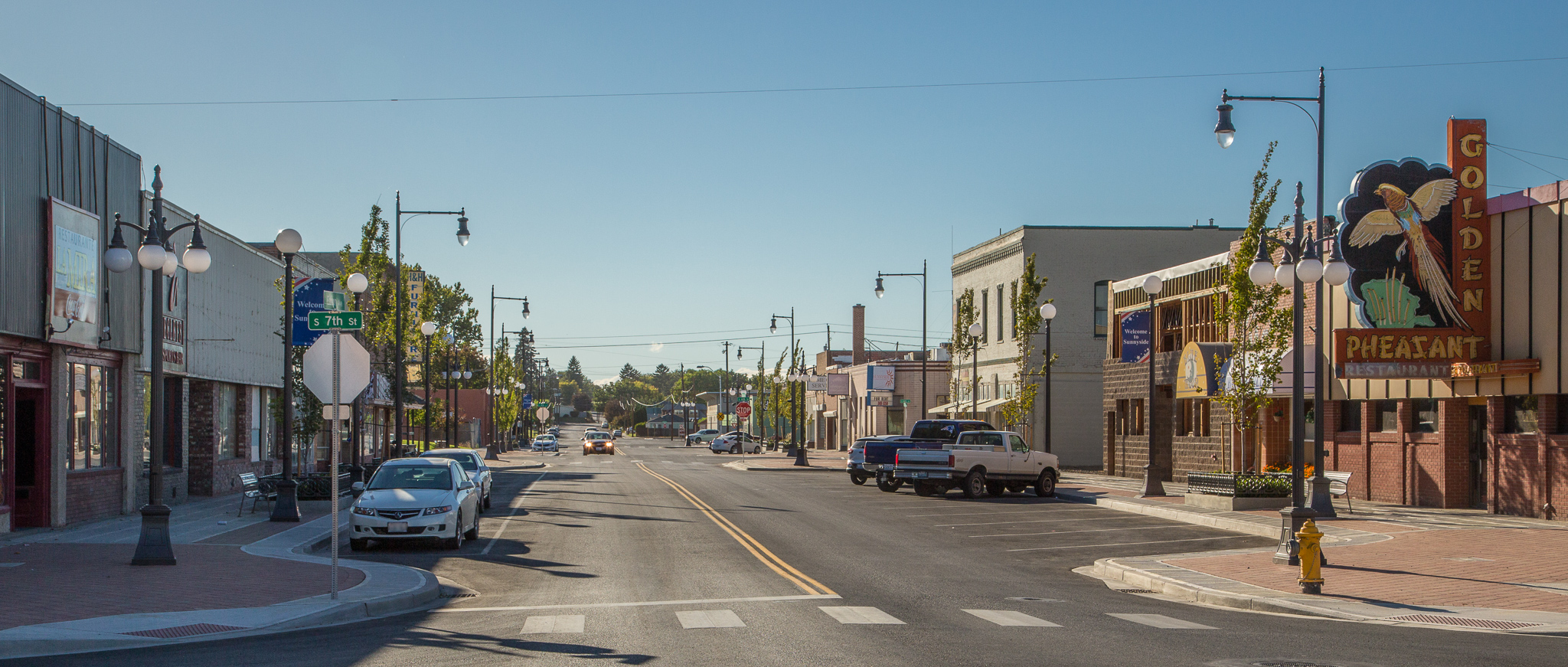
- Edison Avenue
- Interactive location map of Sunnyside
- Coordinates: 46°19′04″N 119°59′40″W
- Country: United States
- State: Washington
- County: Yakima
- Incorporated: September 16, 1902

Government
  - Type: Council–manager

Area
  - Total: 7.53 sq mi (19.49 km^{2})
  - Land: 7.53 sq mi (19.49 km^{2})
  - Water: 0 sq mi (0.00 km^{2})
- Elevation: 735 ft (224 m)

Population (2020)
  - Total: 16,375
  - Estimate (2022): 16,296
  - Density: 2,232.2/sq mi (861.84/km^{2})
- Time zone: UTC−8 (Pacific (PST))
  - Summer (DST): UTC−7 (PDT)
- ZIP code: 98944
- Area code: 509
- FIPS code: 53-68750
- GNIS feature ID: 2412008
- Website: sunnyside-wa.gov

Sunnyside is a city in Yakima County, Washington, United States. The population was 16,375 at the 2020 census, making it the second-most populous city in Yakima County.

== History ==
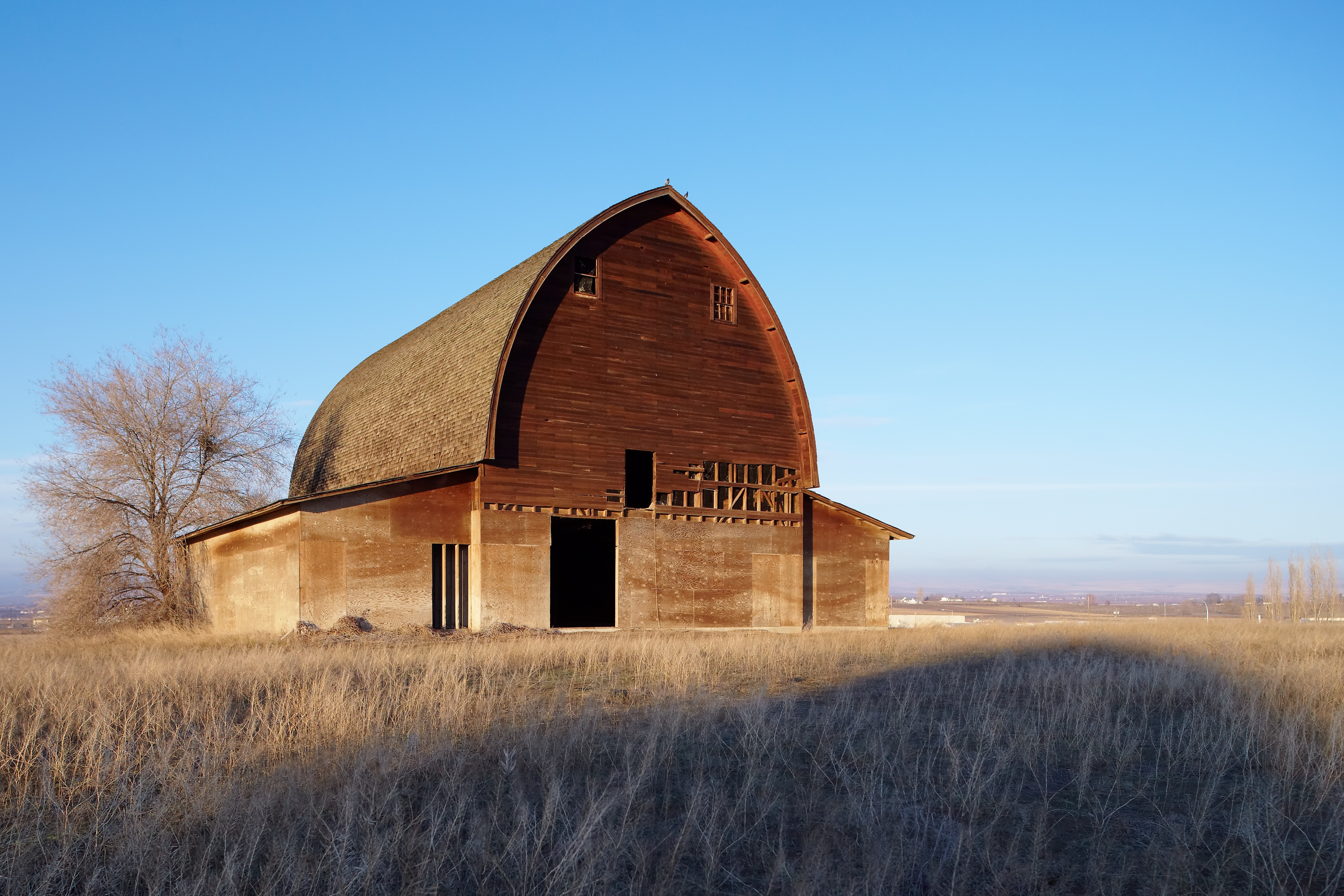
Iconic barn in Sunnyside

Up through the early portion of the 19th century, the portion of the Yakima Valley where Sunnyside is now located was inhabited by the "Taptat-ħlama" (or ″People at the rapids"). These people hunted and fished along Yakima River from the mouth of Satus Creek (contained in present-day Satus immediately southwest of Sunnyside) to present Kiona, with a key fishery at near present-day Prosser.

Several tribes in the region were relocated onto the Yakama Indian Reservation following the 1855 signing of a treaty with the federal government. However, the Yakima War lingered until 1858, with Chief Kamiakin fighting on until the Battle of Four Lakes in 1858.

The modern settlement of Sunnyside was founded by Walter Granger in 1893. The name was coined by a merchant named W. H. Cline. Granger was involved in the financing and construction of the Sunnyside Canal which would have allowed Yakima River water to irrigate the area. However, due to the Panic of 1893, Granger's creditors foreclosed on the canal, and the town's population dwindled to seven families. By the end of 1901, the population had doubled, finally exceeding 300 people. The site contained "1 bank, 11 stores, 3 hotels, 1 newspaper [the Sunnyside Sun, still publishing in 2020], 2 blacksmith shops, 2 livery barns, 3 churches, and a large and growing school".

On September 16, 1902, residents voted 42–1 to incorporate as the town of Sunnyside. At the time, the town had 314 residents, just over the state minimum for an incorporation referendum. The first mayor of Sunnyside was the town druggist James Henderson.

Sunnyside's population increase at this time was stimulated by the immigration of the Dunkards from South Dakota who were moving to the town. The population of Dunkards was of such notable size that, by 1902, it was noted that they had "built a commodious place of worship at Sunnyside" which was the largest church in Yakima County at the time.

The Dunkards, members of the German Baptist Progressive Brethren, relocated to Sunnyside in order to form what they called the Christian Cooperative Colony. They bought the entire town site and were the developers of its first bank, and a telephone system. They enforced clauses prohibiting alcohol, dancing and gambling as a condition on every parcel of land sold. Because of this, old maps of Washington identify the town with a cross or halo symbol.

In the 1930s, refugees from the Dust Bowl (some of them Okies) also moved to Sunnyside.

Under the leadership of mayor William Bright "Billy" Cloud (1870–1959), Sunnyside initiated a project to pave its dirt streets on June 5, 1917. This project was necessary since years of irrigation had raised the water table to the point that the streets had become unbearably muddy. The cost of the entire project was $62,629.45.

In 1948, Sunnyside became the first city in the state to adopt a council–manager system of government. The system provides for an elected city council which is responsible for policy making, and a professional city manager, appointed by the council, who is responsible for administration. The city manager provides policy advice, directs the daily operations of city government, handles personnel functions (including the power to appoint and remove employees) and is responsible for preparing the city budget. Under the council-manager statutes, the city council is prohibited from interfering with the manager's administration. The city manager, however, is directly accountable to and can be removed by a majority vote of the council at any time.

Sunnyside was named an All-America City in 1979.

== Geography ==
According to the United States Census Bureau, the city has a total area of 6.63 square miles (17.17 km^{2}), all of it land.

Sunnyside lies approximately 180 miles away from Seattle to the west, Spokane to the east and Portland to the southwest.

=== Climate ===
Sunnyside has a cold desert climate (BWk) according to the Köppen climate classification system.

Climate data for Sunnyside, Washington (1991–2020 normals, extremes 1894–2014)
Month	Jan	Feb	Mar	Apr	May	Jun	Jul	Aug	Sep	Oct	Nov	Dec	Year
Record high °F (°C)	70 (21)	72 (22)	82 (28)	96 (36)	104 (40)	107 (42)	112 (44)	108 (42)	103 (39)	89 (32)	77 (25)	69 (21)	112 (44)
Mean maximum °F (°C)	58.6 (14.8)	61.9 (16.6)	71.3 (21.8)	81.6 (27.6)	90.7 (32.6)	96.9 (36.1)	102.7 (39.3)	101.2 (38.4)	93.0 (33.9)	81.3 (27.4)	66.7 (19.3)	57.8 (14.3)	103.6 (39.8)
Mean daily maximum °F (°C)	37.6 (3.1)	45.4 (7.4)	55.4 (13.0)	63.3 (17.4)	72.8 (22.7)	79.2 (26.2)	88.2 (31.2)	86.5 (30.3)	77.7 (25.4)	63.6 (17.6)	48.3 (9.1)	37.1 (2.8)	62.9 (17.2)
Daily mean °F (°C)	30.3 (−0.9)	34.9 (1.6)	42.5 (5.8)	49.4 (9.7)	58.2 (14.6)	64.2 (17.9)	71.3 (21.8)	69.4 (20.8)	61.1 (16.2)	49.4 (9.7)	37.8 (3.2)	29.7 (−1.3)	49.9 (9.9)
Mean daily minimum °F (°C)	23.0 (−5.0)	24.3 (−4.3)	29.7 (−1.3)	35.6 (2.0)	43.7 (6.5)	49.1 (9.5)	54.4 (12.4)	52.2 (11.2)	44.5 (6.9)	35.2 (1.8)	27.4 (−2.6)	22.4 (−5.3)	36.8 (2.7)
Mean minimum °F (°C)	11.7 (−11.3)	16.1 (−8.8)	22.6 (−5.2)	27.8 (−2.3)	33.7 (0.9)	41.6 (5.3)	47.5 (8.6)	45.5 (7.5)	37.2 (2.9)	25.4 (−3.7)	17.4 (−8.1)	10.5 (−11.9)	6.6 (−14.1)
Record low °F (°C)	−26 (−32)	−19 (−28)	7 (−14)	15 (−9)	24 (−4)	32 (0)	39 (4)	36 (2)	18 (−8)	12 (−11)	−5 (−21)	−15 (−26)	−26 (−32)
Average precipitation inches (mm)	0.98 (25)	0.65 (17)	0.54 (14)	0.61 (15)	0.75 (19)	0.59 (15)	0.14 (3.6)	0.26 (6.6)	0.36 (9.1)	0.74 (19)	0.85 (22)	1.18 (30)	7.65 (194)
Average snowfall inches (cm)	1.6 (4.1)	0.7 (1.8)	trace	0.0 (0.0)	0.0 (0.0)	0.0 (0.0)	0.0 (0.0)	0.0 (0.0)	0.0 (0.0)	0.0 (0.0)	0.8 (2.0)	5.7 (14)	8.8 (22)
Average precipitation days (≥ 0.01 in)	8.6	6.2	5.6	5.9	6.1	4.3	2.0	2.3	2.8	5.8	7.8	8.6	66.0
Average snowy days (≥ 0.1 in)	1.9	0.8	0.1	0.0	0.0	0.0	0.0	0.0	0.0	0.0	0.8	3.1	6.7
Source 1: NOAA (snow 1981–2010)
Source 2: Western Regional Climate Center

== Demographics ==
Historical population
Census	Pop.	Note	%±
1910	1,379		—
1920	1,809		31.2%
1930	2,113		16.8%
1940	2,368		12.1%
1950	4,194		77.1%
1960	6,208		48.0%
1970	6,751		8.7%
1980	9,225		36.6%
1990	11,238		21.8%
2000	13,905		23.7%
2010	15,858		14.0%
2020	16,375		3.3%
2025 (est.)	16,430		0.3%
U.S. Decennial Census; 2020 Census

=== 2020 census ===
As of the 2020 census, Sunnyside had a population of 16,375. The median age was 27.8 years; 35.1% of residents were under the age of 18 and 9.3% were 65 years of age or older. For every 100 females there were 96.9 males, and for every 100 females age 18 and over there were 94.0 males age 18 and over.

According to the 2020 census, 98.8% of residents lived in urban areas while 1.2% lived in rural areas.

There were 4,637 households in Sunnyside, of which 54.6% had children under the age of 18 living in them. Of all households, 46.3% were married-couple households, 15.3% were households with a male householder and no spouse or partner present, and 28.2% were households with a female householder and no spouse or partner present. About 15.5% of all households were made up of individuals and 6.1% had someone living alone who was 65 years of age or older.

There were 4,845 housing units, of which 4.3% were vacant. The homeowner vacancy rate was 1.0% and the rental vacancy rate was 4.6%.

Racial composition as of the 2020 census
Race	Number	Percent
White	4,030	24.6%
Black or African American	34	0.2%
American Indian and Alaska Native	514	3.1%
Asian	100	0.6%
Native Hawaiian and Other Pacific Islander	22	0.1%
Some other race	8,159	49.8%
Two or more races	3,516	21.5%
Hispanic or Latino (of any race)	14,193	86.7%

=== 2010 census ===
As of the 2010 census, there were 15,858 people, 4,332 households, and 3,428 families residing in the city. The population density was 2,391.9 per square mile (923.5/km^{2}). There were 4,556 housing units at an average density of 687.2 per square mile (265.3/km^{2}). The racial make-up was 43.4% White, 0.3% African American, 0.9% Native American, 0.7% Asian, 52.3% from other races and 2.3% from two or more races. Hispanic or Latino of any race were 82.2% of the population.

There were 4,332 households, of which 57.8% had children under the age of 18 living with them, 49.6% were married couples living together, 21.1% had a female householder with no husband present, 8.4% had a male householder with no wife present and 20.9% were non-families. 17.0% of all households were made up of individuals, and 8.6% had someone living alone who was 65 years of age or older. The average household size was 3.60 and the average family size was 4.02.

The median age was 25 years. 38.5% of residents were under the age of 18, 11.4% were between the ages of 18 and 24, 26.4% were from 25 to 44, 15.3% were from 45 to 64 and 8.3% were 65 years of age or older. The sex makeup was 50.1% male and 49.9% female.

=== 2000 census ===
As of the 2000 census, there were 13,905 people, 3,827 households, and 3,000 families residing in the city. The population density was 2,340.4 per square mile (903.6/km^{2}). There were 4,070 housing units at an average density of 685.0 per square mile (264.5/km^{2}). The racial make-up of the city was 42.61% White, 0.40% African American, 0.63% Native American, 0.69% Asian, 0.09% Pacific Islander, 52.58% from other races and 3.01% from two or more races. Hispanic or Latino of any race were 73.05% of the population.

There were 3,827 households, of which 50.2% had children under the age of 18 living with them, 55.1% were married couples living together, 16.6% had a female householder with no husband present, and 21.6% were non-families. 18.6% of all households were made up of individuals, and 11.0% had someone living alone who was 65 years of age or older. The average household size was 3.58 and the average family size was 4.02.

38.1% of the population were under the age of 18, 11.7% from 18 to 24, 26.6% from 25 to 44, 14.0% from 45 to 64, and 9.6% were 65 years of age or older. The median age was 25 years. For every 100 females, there were 99.0 males. For every 100 females age 18 and over, there were 94.7 males.

The median household income was $27,583 and the median family income was $28,304. Males had a median income of $25,187 and females $25,779. The per capita income was $10,366. About 29.1% of families and 34.5% of the population were below the poverty line, including 46.2% of those under age 18 and 18.1% of those age 65 or over.

== Attractions and events ==
=== Lighted Farm Implement Parade ===
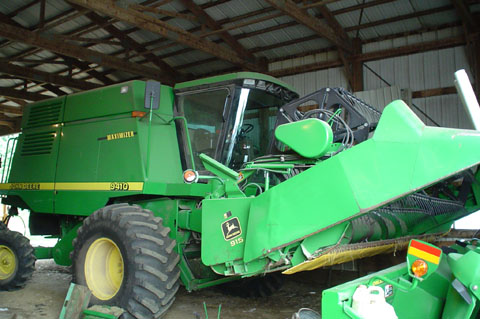
A 9410 John Deere Combine harvester typical of a parade entrant

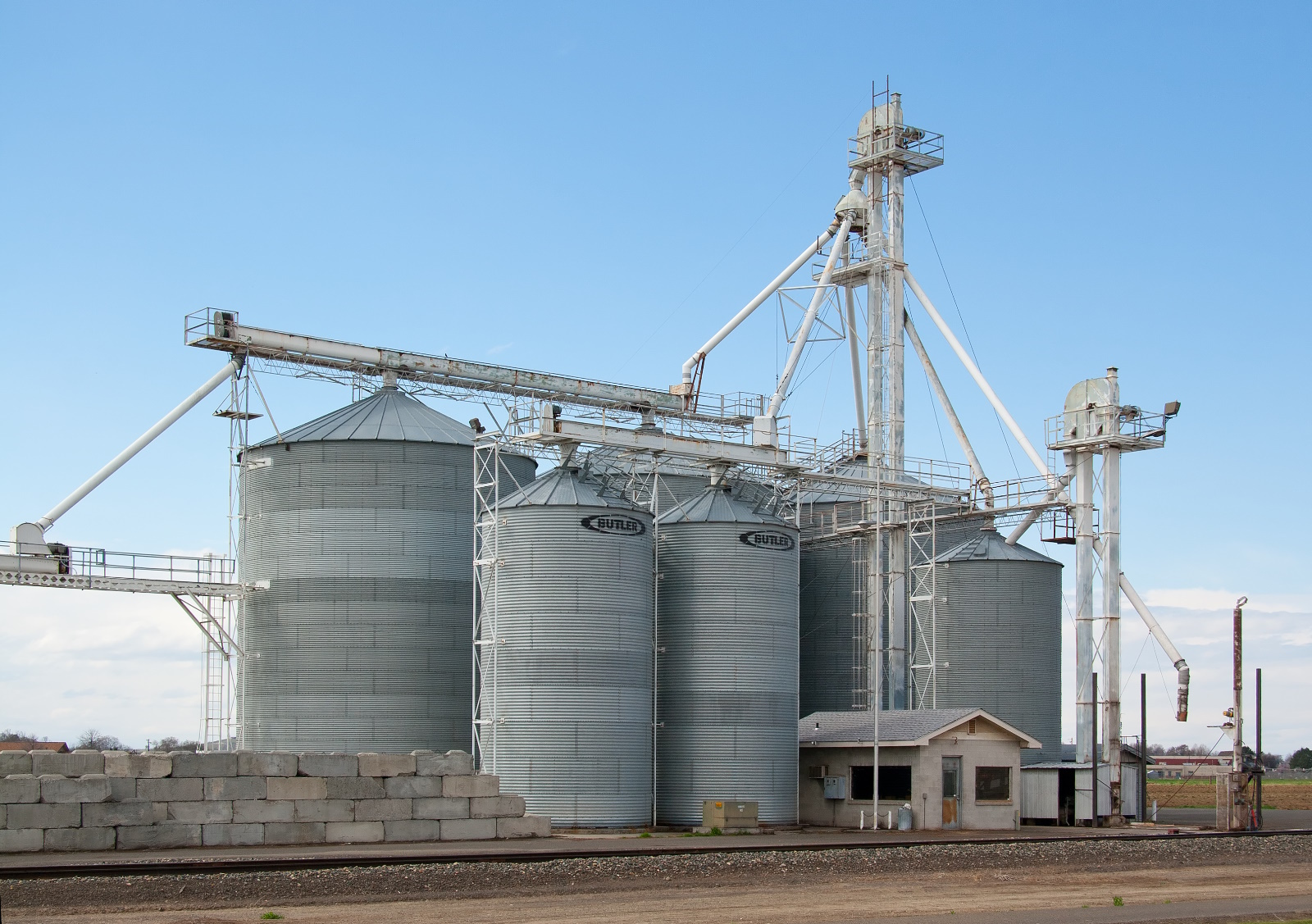
Silos at a grain elevator facility on the east side of Sunnyside

First held in 1989, the 'Lighted Farm Implement Parade has been called "the NW's premier lighted parade". Usually taking place in early December, the parade includes "farm implements: combines, boom trucks, sprayers, swathers, grape pickers, and all types of tractors" decorated with colorful lights. The 2006 edition of the event had more than 70 parade entrants. The A&E network once named the event one of the "Top 10" such parades in the United States. The parade was the first of its kind in the Yakima Valley.

=== Darigold cheese factory ===
The Darigold Dairy Fair manufactured 150 million pounds of cheese annually but was mostly noted for its colorful facade and circus-like decorations, which included a pair of cows swinging on a flying trapeze. The Dairy Fair Store was shut down in 2012.

=== Sunnyside Historical Museum ===
Located downtown, the museum houses and displays artifacts and documents with a focus on daily life in Sunnyside during its early years. The building housing the museum was donated to the city by Robert and Martha McIntosh, who had purchased the business from the family of Walter C. Ball & Sons, the local undertaking business. Both were also among the pioneering families that founded Sunnyside. The Sunnyside Memorial Cemetery, founded by the Ball Family, is located north of town. The lone structure at that location was designed by Percy Ball to resemble Chingford Church in Walthamstow, England, where Walter C. Ball and his wife Amelia grew up together. This building was used to house the retort for cremations until it fell into disrepair. The family plots of the Ball family are located on the east side of the structure.

== Schools ==
Many of the original school buildings in Sunnyside, and the town of Outlook just northwest of town, have either burned to the ground or been demolished to make way for bigger and better structures. One of the original structures still in use is the Lincoln School Building which sits at the intersection of Lincoln and Sixth Street. Erected in 1927, it is a two-story structure with an adjacent gymnasium attached to the east wing of the building. In 1928, female teachers were not allowed to marry. Doing so would void their contract to teach.

The land on which Lincoln School sits was donated to the school district by H. Lloyd Miller in 1926. He and his wife later donated the land next to it between the school and 9th Ave. to be used for playing fields for the students. Lincoln is still one of the oldest buildings in the school district. It has been remodeled and renovated to accommodate the administrative offices for the district.

Sunnyside High School was named a School of Distinction in 2015 and 2016. According to ESD105, "The Schools of Distinction Award goes to the top 5 percent of Washington schools that have attained the most outstanding levels of sustained improvement in English language arts, math, and graduation rates among their students over the past five years."

=== Libraries ===
Sunnyside has one public library. The original public library, a Carnegie Library, was built in 1911. It was replaced in 1964 with the current library building. It is the second largest library in the Yakima Valley Libraries and has one of the largest Spanish language collections in the system.

== Notable people ==
- Bonnie J. Dunbar, NASA astronaut
- Jake Kupp, NFL player
- Scott Linehan, NFL coach
- Scott Meyer, web comic author
- Dan Newhouse, U.S. representative for Washington
- Irv Newhouse, state legislator
- Jim Pomeroy, professional motocross racer and member of the Motorcycle Hall of Fame
- Jens Pulver, MMA legend, first UFC Lightweight Champion, and UFC Hall of Famer.
- Margaret Rayburn, teacher and member of the Washington House of Representatives
- Earl Smith, baseball player, Pittsburgh Pirates
- Rob Thomas, TV writer
- Zach Top, country music singer
- Cooper Kupp, Seattle Seahawks Super Bowl winner
