= Jeremie Dufault =

American politician

Member of the Washington House of Representatives from the 15th district
- Incumbent
- Assumed office January 13, 2025 Serving with Chris Corry
- Preceded by: Bryan Sandlin
- Succeeded by: Reedy Berg (elect)
- In office January 14, 2019 – January 9, 2023
- Preceded by: David Taylor
- Succeeded by: Bryan Sandlin

Personal details
- Born: Jeremie Joseph Dufault; 1978 (age 47–48) Selah, Washington, U.S.
- Party: Republican
- Education: University of Pennsylvania (JD); Harvard University (JD)

Military service
- Branch/service: United States Army
- Battles/wars: War in Afghanistan

Jeremie Joseph Dufault (born 1978) is an American attorney, businessman, and politician serving as a member of the Washington House of Representatives from the 15th district. First elected in 2018, Dufault's district included the eastern half of Yakima County.

== Early life and education ==
Dufault was born in Selah, Washington and raised in Yakima, Washington, where attended A.C. Davis High School. A member of the United States Army Reserve, Dufault served in Kuwait and Afghanistan. He was also a member of the Judge Advocate General's Corps. Dufault graduated from the University of Pennsylvania and earned a Juris Doctor from Harvard Law School.

== Career ==
After returning to Yakima, Washington, Dufault became a real estate developer, specializing in senior, student, and family housing.

In 2017, Dufault was elected to the Selah City Council. Dufault was elected to the Washington House of Representatives in 2018 and took office on January 14, 2019.

In 2022, the new redistricting map moved Dufault's home into the 14th Legislative District and he did not run for reelection. In 2023, a U.S. District Judge Robert Lasnik ruled that the 15th district was in violation of the Voting Rights Act of 1965. The new map moved Selah back into the 15th district.

In April 2025, House Speaker Laurie Jinkins barred Dufault from the House chamber for the rest of the session, after repeated outbursts on the legislative floor. Dufault was permitted to remotely participate in debates and to vote.

== Awards ==
- 2020 Guardians of Small Business. Presented by NFIB.
