= Carter Young =

American baseball player (born 2001)

Free agent
- Shortstop
- Born: January 24, 2001 (age 25); Yakima, Washington, U.S.
- Bats: Left Throws: Right
Medals
Men's baseball
Representing United States
U-18 Baseball World Cup
Gold medal – first place	2017 Thunder Bay	Team
U-15 Baseball World Cup
Bronze medal – third place	2016 Iwaki	Team

Carter Isaak Young (born January 24, 2001) is an American professional baseball shortstop who is a free agent.

== Amateur career ==
Young began playing baseball as a child and began switch hitting at age ten after former MLB player Jay Gainer suggested it to him. He attended Selah High School in Selah, Washington. As a freshman in 2016, he helped Selah win their first ever state championship. In 2018, his junior year, he batted .412 with four home runs and 26 RBIs and was named the Washington Gatorade Baseball Player of the Year. That summer, he played in the Under Armour All-America Baseball Game at Wrigley Field. As a senior in 2019, he helped lead Selah to their second state championship in four years. During his high school career, he played for both the USA Baseball 15U National Team that won a bronze medal as well as for the 18U National Team.

Young went unselected in the 2019 Major League Baseball draft and enrolled at Vanderbilt University to play college baseball. As a freshman in 2020, he started all 18 games in which he batted .328 with 12 RBIs before the season was cancelled due to the COVID-19 pandemic. He played for the Yakima Valley Pippins of the West Coast League that summer. In 2021, his sophomore year, he was forced to miss time due to a dislocated shoulder, but still started 61 games in which he slashed .252/.341/.559 with 16 home runs and 51 RBIs. He had the game-winning RBI in Game 2 of the Nashville Super Regional which ultimately allowed the Commodores to advance to the 2021 College World Series where they lost the series 2-1 to Mississippi State University. His 84 strikeouts over 238 at-bats led NCAA Division I. He underwent shoulder surgery shortly after the season's end. Young opened the 2022 season as a top prospect for the upcoming draft, but his stock fell after he finished the year batting .207 with seven home runs and 26 RBIs over 56 games, losing his starting spot during the season. He entered the transfer portal after the season. He later announced he would be transferring at Louisiana State University (LSU).

== Professional career ==
Young was selected by the Baltimore Orioles in the 17th round of the 2022 Major League Baseball draft. He signed with the team for $1.32 million.

Young made his professional debut with the Florida Complex League Orioles and was later promoted to the Delmarva Shorebirds. Over 18 games between both teams, he batted .253 with one home run and eight RBI. Young opened the 2023 season with Delmarva and was promoted to the Aberdeen IronBirds in early August. Over 100 games between the two teams, he hit .244 with three home runs and 37 RBI. In 2024, he played 112 games between Aberdeen and the Bowie Baysox and batted .214 with six home runs, 41 RBI and 19 stolen bases. Young played the 2025 season with Aberdeen, the Baysox (now the Chesapeake Baysox) and the Norfolk Tides and hit .180 with two home runs and 23 RBI over 78 games.

In 2026, Young appeared in 78 games split between Chesapeake and Norfolk and slashed .191/.320/.289 with four home runs, 30 RBI, and four stolen bases. On August 6, 2026, Young was released by the Orioles organization.
