= 2023–24 Gonzaga Bulldogs men's basketball team =

2023–24 Gonzaga Bulldogs men's basketball

NCAA tournament, Sweet Sixteen
- Conference: West Coast Conference

Ranking
- Coaches: No. 16
- AP: No. 15
- Record: 27–8 (14–2 WCC)
- Head coach: Mark Few (25th season)
- Assistant coaches: Brian Michaelson (11th season); Stephen Gentry (3rd season); R-Jay Barsh (1st season); Zach Norvell Jr. (1st season)
- Home arena: McCarthey Athletic Center

2023–24 West Coast Conference men's basketball standings
	Conf.				Overall
Team	W		L	PCT	W		L	PCT
No. 21 Saint Mary's †	15	–	1	.938	26	–	8	.765
No. 15 Gonzaga	14	–	2	.875	27	–	8	.771
San Francisco	11	–	5	.688	23	–	11	.676
Santa Clara	10	–	6	.625	20	–	13	.606
San Diego	7	–	9	.438	18	–	15	.545
Portland	5	–	11	.313	12	–	21	.364
Loyola Marymount	5	–	11	.313	12	–	19	.387
Pepperdine	5	–	11	.313	13	–	20	.394
Pacific	0	–	16	.000	6	–	26	.188
† 2024 WCC tournament winner Rankings from AP Poll

The 2023–24 Gonzaga Bulldogs men's basketball team represented Gonzaga University, located in Spokane, Washington, in the 2023–24 NCAA Division I men's basketball season. The team, also unofficially nicknamed the "Zags", was led by head coach Mark Few, in his 25th season as head coach, and played home games at the on-campus McCarthey Athletic Center as members of the West Coast Conference (WCC). They finished the season 27–8, 14–2 in WCC play to finish in second place, failing to win at least a share of the regular season title for the first time since 2012. As the No. 2 seed in the WCC Tournament, they defeated San Francisco in the semifinals, before losing to Saint Mary's in the championship. They received an at-large bid to the NCAA Tournament where as the No. 5 seed in the Midwest region, they defeated McNeese in the First Round and Kansas in the Second Round to reach their ninth consecutive Sweet Sixteen, where they lost to Purdue.

== Previous season ==
The Bulldogs finished the 2021–22 season 31–6, 14–2 in WCC Play to win the regular season championship with Saint Mary's. They defeated San Francisco and Saint Mary's in the WCC tournament to win the tournament championship. As a result, they received the conference's automatic bid to the NCAA tournament as the No. 3 seed in the West region, where they defeated Grand Canyon in the first round, TCU in the second round, UCLA in the sweet sixteen before losing to national champion UConn in the elite eight.

On January 19, 2023, the Zags lost to Loyola Marymount at the McCarthey Athletic Center, ending their 76-game home winning streak, which was the longest in the nation at the time.

== Offseason ==
=== Departures ===
Gonzaga Bulldogs Departures
Name	Number	Pos.	Height	Weight	Year	Hometown	Reason for departure
Rasir Bolton	45	G	6'3"	185	Senior	Petersburg, VA	Completed college eligibility
Drew Timme	2	F	6'10"	235	Senior	Richardson, TX	Declared for 2023 NBA draft; undrafted
Malachi Smith	13	G	6'4'	210	RS Junior	Belleville, IL	Declared for 2023 NBA draft; undrafted
Julian Strawther	0	G	6'7"	205	Junior	Las Vegas, NV	Declared for 2023 NBA draft; selected 29th overall by Indiana Pacers
Dominick Harris	55	G	6'3"	185	RS Sophomore	Murrieta, CA	Transferred to Loyola Marymount
Abe Eagle	30	F	6'9"	225	RS Sophomore	Los Angeles, CA	Walk-on; left team
Kaden Perry	20	F	6'9"	230	Sophomore	Battle Ground, WA	Retired from basketball due to injury
Hunter Sallis	5	G	6'5"	180	Sophomore	Omaha, NE	Transferred to Wake Forest
Efton Reid	15	C	7'0"	240	Sophomore	Richmond, VA	Transferred to Wake Forest
Kellen Mitchell	4	G	6'6"	205	Freshman	Spring Lake, MI	Walk-on; left team

=== Incoming transfers ===
Gonzaga incoming transfers
Name	Number	Pos.	Height	Weight	Year	Hometown	Previous School
Steele Venters	2	G	6'7"	195	RS Junior	Ellensburg, WA	Eastern Washington
Graham Ike	13	F	6'9"	240	RS Junior	Aurora, CO	Wyoming
Ryan Nembhard	0	G	6'0"	175	Junior	Aurora, ON	Creighton
Jun Seok Yeo	21	F	6'8"	215	Sophomore	Seoul, South Korea	Korea University

=== Recruiting classes ===
==== 2023 recruiting class ====
College recruiting
Name	Hometown	School	Height	Weight	Commit date
Dusty Stromer #12 SG	Sherman Oaks, CA	Notre Dame HS	6 ft 6 in (1.98 m)	192 lb (87 kg)	May 1, 2022
Dusty Stromer #12 SG	Recruit ratings: Rivals: 247Sports: ESPN: (88)				
Luka Krajnović; SG	Zagreb, Croatia	N/A	6 ft 5 in (1.96 m)	185 lb (84 kg)	Aug 12, 2023
Luka Krajnović; SG	Recruit ratings: Rivals: 247Sports: ESPN: (0)				
Pavle Stošić; PF	Niš, Serbia	N/A	6 ft 9 in (2.06 m)	196 lb (89 kg)	Sep 25, 2023
Pavle Stošić; PF	Recruit ratings: Rivals: 247Sports: ESPN: (0)				
Overall recruit ranking:
Note: In many cases, Scout, Rivals, 247Sports, On3, and ESPN may conflict in their listings of height and weight.; In these cases, the average was taken. ESPN grades are on a 100-point scale.; Sources: "Gonzaga 2023 Basketball Commitments". Rivals.; "2023 Gonzaga Bulldogs Recruiting Class". ESPN.; "2023 Team Ranking". Rivals.

== Roster ==
Note: Players' year is based on remaining eligibility. The NCAA did not count the 2020–21 season towards eligibility.

2023–24 Gonzaga Bulldogs men's basketball team
Players
Coaches

Pos.	#	Name	Height	Weight	Year	Previous school	Hometown
F	22	Anton Watson	6 ft 8 in (2.03 m)	228 lb (103 kg)	GS	Gonzaga Prep	Spokane, WA
F	25	Colby Brooks (W)	6 ft 7 in (2.01 m)	215 lb (98 kg)	RS Jr	Loyola HS	Los Angeles, CA
G	2	Steele Venters (injured)	6 ft 7 in (2.01 m)	195 lb (88 kg)	RS Jr	Ellensburg; Eastern Washington	Ellensburg, WA
F	13	Graham Ike	6 ft 9 in (2.06 m)	240 lb (109 kg)	RS Jr	Overland; Wyoming	Aurora, CO
F	33	Ben Gregg	6 ft 10 in (2.08 m)	230 lb (104 kg)	Jr	Clackamas	Clackamas, OR
G	11	Nolan Hickman	6 ft 2 in (1.88 m)	183 lb (83 kg)	Jr	Wasatch Academy	Seattle, WA
G	15	Joe Few (W)	6 ft 0 in (1.83 m)	170 lb (77 kg)	Jr	Gonzaga Prep	Spokane, WA
G	0	Ryan Nembhard	6 ft 0 in (1.83 m)	175 lb (79 kg)	Jr	Montverde; Creighton	Aurora, ON
F	21	Jun Seok Yeo	6 ft 8 in (2.03 m)	215 lb (98 kg)	So	Yongsan; Korea University	Seoul, South Korea
F	34	Braden Huff	6 ft 10 in (2.08 m)	242 lb (110 kg)	RS Fr	Glenbard West	Glen Ellyn, IL
G	4	Dusty Stromer	6 ft 6 in (1.98 m)	192 lb (87 kg)	Fr	Notre Dame HS	Sherman Oaks, CA
G	3	Luka Krajnović	6 ft 5 in (1.96 m)	185 lb (84 kg)	Fr	Bosco	Zagreb, Croatia
G	10	Joaquim ArauzMoore (W) (redshirt)	6 ft 1 in (1.85 m)	170 lb (77 kg)	Fr	Branson	Ross, CA
F	14	Pavle Stošić	6 ft 9 in (2.06 m)	196 lb (89 kg)	Fr	CBP Huesca	Niš, Serbia

Head coach

- Mark Few (Oregon)

Assistant coach(es)

- Brian Michaelson (Gonzaga)
- Stephen Gentry (Gonzaga)
- R-Jay Barsh (Puget Sound)
- Zach Norvell Jr. (Gonzaga)

Legend

- (C) Team captain
- (S) Suspended
- (I) Ineligible
- (W) Walk-on
- Injured
- Current redshirt

Roster
Last update: September 25, 2023

- Roster is subject to change as/if players transfer or leave the program for other reasons.

== Schedule and results ==
Date time, TV	Rank^{#}	Opponent^{#}	Result	Record	High points	High rebounds	High assists	Site (attendance) city, state
Exhibition
November 3, 2023*; 6:00 p.m., KHQ	No. 11	Lewis–Clark State	W 96–58	–	24 – Ike	9 – Huff	10 – Nembhard	McCarthey Athletic Center (6,000); Spokane, WA
Regular season
November 10, 2023*; 6:00 p.m., KHQ/RTNW	No. 11	Yale	W 86–71	1–0	19 – Huff	12 – Watson	7 – Nembhard	McCarthey Athletic Center (6,000); Spokane, WA
November 14, 2023*; 6:00 p.m., KHQ/RTNW+	No. 11	Eastern Oregon	W 123–57	2–0	25 – Ike	11 – Ike	5 – Hickman	McCarthey Athletic Center (6,000); Spokane, WA
November 20, 2023*; 2:00 p.m., ESPN2	No. 11	vs. No. 2 Purdue; Maui Invitational Quarterfinals	L 63–73	2–1	14 – Ike	7 – Ike	6 – Nembhard	Stan Sheriff Center (4,838); Honolulu, HI
November 21, 2023*; 11:30 a.m., ESPN2	No. 11	vs. Syracuse; Maui Invitational Consolation	W 76–57	3–1	19 – Hickman	14 – Ike	7 – Nembhard	Stan Sheriff Center (−); Honolulu, HI
November 22, 2023*; 5:00 p.m., ESPN2	No. 11	vs. UCLA; Maui Invitational 5th Place Game	W 69–65	4–1	32 – Watson	8 – Tied	4 – Nembhard	Stan Sheriff Center (3,757); Honolulu, HI
November 28, 2023*; 6:00 p.m., KHQ/RTNW+	No. 11	Cal State Bakersfield	W 81–65	5–1	22 – Nembhard	13 – Watson	5 – Nembhard	McCarthey Athletic Center (6,000); Spokane, WA
December 2, 2023*; 7:00 p.m., ESPN	No. 11	vs. USC; Legends of Basketball Invitational	W 89–76	6–1	15 – Tied	10 – Ike	7 – Nembhard	MGM Grand Garden Arena (8,116); Paradise, NV
December 5, 2023*; 6:00 p.m., KHQ/RTNW+	No. 7	Arkansas–Pine Bluff	W 111–71	7–1	19 – Huff	9 – Ike	6 – Nembhard	McCarthey Athletic Center (6,000); Spokane, WA
December 9, 2023*; 8:00 p.m., ESPN2	No. 7	at Washington; Rivalry	L 73–78	7–2	18 – Ike	13 – Watson	7 – Nembhard	Alaska Airlines Arena (9,294); Seattle, WA
December 11, 2023*; 6:00 p.m., KHQ/RTNW+	No. 10	Mississippi Valley State	W 78–40	8–2	17 – Huff	8 – Ike	5 – Tied	McCarthey Athletic Center (6,000); Spokane, WA
December 15, 2023*; 7:00 p.m., ESPN2	No. 10	vs. No. 5 UConn; Continental Tire Seattle Tip-Off	L 63–76	8–3	20 – Watson	6 – Stromer	3 – Hickman	Climate Pledge Arena (16,405); Seattle, WA
December 20, 2023*; 6:00 p.m., KHQ/RTNW	No. 15	Jackson State	W 100–76	9–3	22 – Ike	11 – Ike	6 – Tied	McCarthey Athletic Center (6,000); Spokane, WA
December 29, 2023*; 6:00 p.m., ESPN2	No. 13	San Diego State	L 74–84	9–4	20 – Ike	10 – Ike	9 – Nembhard	McCarthey Athletic Center (6,000); Spokane, WA
January 4, 2024; 6:00 p.m., KHQ/RTNW+	No. 24	Pepperdine; CCF Classic	W 86–60	10–4 (1–0)	20 – Ike	7 – Tied	7 – Nembhard	Spokane Arena (12,015); Spokane, WA
January 6, 2024; 6:00 p.m., KHQ/RTNW	No. 24	San Diego	W 101–74	11–4 (2–0)	22 – Gregg	8 – Ike	9 – Nembhard	McCarthey Athletic Center (6,000); Spokane, WA
January 11, 2024; 6:30 p.m., ESPN	No. 23	at Santa Clara	L 76–77	11–5 (2–1)	32 – Watson	9 – Watson	5 – Nembhard	Leavey Center (4,200); Santa Clara, CA
January 18, 2024; 7:00 p.m., KHQ/RTNW+		at Pepperdine	W 86–61	12–5 (3–1)	24 – Ike	10 – Gregg	8 – Nembhard	Firestone Fieldhouse (3,128); Malibu, CA
January 20, 2024; 7:00 p.m., KHQ/RTNW		at San Diego	W 105–63	13–5 (4–1)	26 – Huff	11 – Gregg	12 – Nembhard	Jenny Craig Pavilion (3,007); San Diego, CA
January 25, 2024; 6:00 p.m., ESPN2		San Francisco	W 77–72	14–5 (5–1)	22 – Ike	7 – Ike	6 – Nembhard	McCarthey Athletic Center (6,000); Spokane, WA
January 27, 2024; 7:00 p.m., KAYU/RTNW		at Pacific	W 82–73	15–5 (6–1)	20 – Watson	11 – Watson	4 – Hickman	Alex G. Spanos Center (3,165); Stockton, CA
January 30, 2024; 8:00 p.m., ESPN		Loyola Maymount	W 92–58	16–5 (7–1)	24 – Hickman	5 – Tied	5 – Hickman	McCarthey Athletic Center (6,000); Spokane, WA
February 3, 2024; 7:30 p.m., ESPN		Saint Mary's; Rivalry	L 62–64	16–6 (7–2)	18 – Nembhard	12 – Ike	2 – Tied	McCarthey Athletic Center (6,000); Spokane, WA
February 7, 2024; 5:00 p.m., CBSSN		Portland	W 96–64	17–6 (8–2)	20 – Watson	7 – Tied	6 – Nembhard	McCarthey Athletic Center (6,000); Spokane, WA
February 10, 2024*; 1:00 p.m., CBS		at No. 17 Kentucky	W 89–85	18–6	23 – Ike	7 – Watson	9 – Nembhard	Rupp Arena (20,186); Lexington, KY
February 15, 2024; 6:00 p.m., CBSSN		at Loyola Marymount	W 91–74	19–6 (9–2)	23 – Ike	11 – Watson	11 – Nembhard	Gersten Pavilion (2,827); Los Angeles, CA
February 17, 2024; 6:00 p.m., KHQ/RTNW		Pacific	W 102–76	20–6 (10–2)	21 – Ike	6 – Tied	10 – Nembhard	McCarthey Athletic Center (6,000); Spokane, WA
February 22, 2024; 6:00 p.m., KHQ/RTNW+		at Portland	W 86–65	21–6 (11–2)	20 – Ike	14 – Ike	7 – Nembhard	Chiles Center (3,803); Portland, OR
February 24, 2024; 7:00 p.m., ESPN2		Santa Clara	W 94–81	22–6 (12–2)	26 – Ike	7 – Ike	6 – Nembhard	McCarthey Athletic Center (6,000); Spokane, WA
February 29, 2024; 8:00 p.m., ESPN2	No. 23	at San Francisco	W 86–68	23–6 (13–2)	26 – Ike	9 – Nembhard	6 – Nembhard	Chase Center (6,480); San Francisco, CA
March 2, 2024; 7:00 p.m., ESPN	No. 23	at No. 17 Saint Mary's; Rivalry	W 70–57	24–6 (14–2)	24 – Ike	10 – Ike	10 – Nembhard	University Credit Union Pavilion (3,500); Moraga, CA
WCC Tournament
March 11, 2024; 8:30 p.m., ESPN2	(2) No. 17	vs. (3) San Francisco; Semifinals	W 89–77	25–6	20 – Hickman	11 – Gregg	12 – Nembhard	Orleans Arena (5,685); Paradise, NV
March 12, 2024; 6:00 p.m., ESPN	(2) No. 17	vs. (1) No. 21 Saint Mary's; Championship	L 60–69	25–7	18 – Watson	7 – Watson	11 – Nembhard	Orleans Arena (5,794); Paradise, NV
NCAA tournament
March 21, 2024*; 4:25 p.m., TBS	(5 MW) No. 18	vs. (12 MW) McNeese; First Round	W 86–65	26–7	16 – Ike	13 – Watson	9 – Tied	Delta Center; Salt Lake City, UT
March 23, 2024*; 12:15 p.m., CBS	(5 MW) No. 18	vs. (4 MW) No. 17 Kansas; Second Round	W 89–68	27–7	21 – Watson	9 – Tied	12 – Nembhard	Delta Center (17,414); Salt Lake City, UT
March 29, 2024*; 4:39 p.m., TBS/TruTV	(5 MW) No. 18	vs. (1 MW) No. 3 Purdue; Sweet Sixteen	L 68–80	27–8	18 – Ike	10 – Ike	7 – Nembhard	Little Caesars Arena; Detroit, MI
*Non-conference game. ^{#}Rankings from AP Poll. (#) Tournament seedings in parentheses. MW=Midwest region. All times are in Pacific Time.

== Rankings ==
Ranking movements Legend: ██ Increase in ranking ██ Decrease in ranking RV = Received votes
	Week																				
Poll	Pre	1	2	3	4	5	6	7	8	9	10	11	12	13	14	15	16	17	18	19	Final
AP	11	11	11	11	7	10	15	13	24	23	RV	RV	RV	RV	RV	RV	23	19	17	18	15
Coaches	12	12	10	10	8	13	16	16	25	21	RV	RV	RV	RV	RV	RV	22	18	15	16	16

== See also ==
- 2023–24 Gonzaga Bulldogs women's basketball team
