= Wilson Middle School =

Wilson Middle School can refer to:

- Wilson Middle School (California), a middle school in the San Diego Unified School District
- Wilson Middle School (Florida), a middle school in Tampa, Florida, part of Hillsborough County Public Schools
- Wilson Middle School (Texas), a middle school in the Plano Independent School District
- Wilson Middle School (Washington), a middle school in the Yakima School District
- Wilson Middle School (Wisconsin), a middle school in the Appleton Area School District

== See also ==
- Castor Gardens Middle School, formerly Woodrow Wilson Middle School, a historic middle school in Philadelphia, PA
