= West Valley, Washington =

- CDP
- Location of West Valley, Washington
- Coordinates: 46°35′55″N 120°36′11″W
- Country: United States
- State: Washington
- County: Yakima

Area
  - Total: 7.2 sq mi (18.7 km^{2})
  - Land: 7.2 sq mi (18.7 km^{2})
  - Water: 0 sq mi (0.0 km^{2})
- Elevation: 1,194 ft (364 m)

Population (2000)
  - Total: 10,433
  - Density: 1,449/sq mi (559.5/km^{2})
- Time zone: UTC-8 (Pacific (PST))
  - Summer (DST): UTC-7 (PDT)
- FIPS code: 53-77885
- GNIS feature ID: 1867646

West Valley is a former census-designated place (CDP) in Yakima County, Washington, United States. The area has been annexed by the city of Yakima. The population was 10,433 at the 2000 census.

Based on per capita income, West Valley ranks 76th of 522 areas in the state of Washington to be ranked.

It has a school district, West Valley School District, which has a high school outside of town.

== Geography ==
West Valley is located at 46°35′55″N 120°36′11″W (46.598731, -120.603011).

According to the United States Census Bureau, the CDP has a total area of 7.2 square miles (18.6 km^{2}), all of it land.

== Demographics ==
As of the census of 2000, there were 10,433 people, 3,862 households, and 3,020 families residing in the CDP. The population density was 1,448.3 people per square mile (559.5/km^{2}). There were 3,964 housing units at an average density of 550.3/sq mi (212.6/km^{2}). The racial makeup of the CDP was 89.60% White, 0.82% African American, 0.90% Native American, 2.04% Asian, 0.13% Pacific Islander, 3.88% from other races, and 2.62% from two or more races. Hispanic or Latino of any race were 8.72% of the population.

There were 3,862 households, out of which 39.9% had children under the age of 18 living with them, 64.8% were married couples living together, 10.2% had a female householder with no husband present, and 21.8% were non-families. 17.0% of all households were made up of individuals, and 6.1% had someone living alone who was 65 years of age or older. The average household size was 2.70 and the average family size was 3.04.

In the CDP, the age distribution of the population shows 29.2% under the age of 18, 6.8% from 18 to 24, 27.9% from 25 to 44, 25.4% from 45 to 64, and 10.7% who were 65 years of age or older. The median age was 36 years. For every 100 females, there were 93.6 males. For every 100 females age 18 and over, there were 89.5 males.

The median income for a household in the CDP was $51,201, and the median income for a family was $55,636. Males had a median income of $41,103 versus $28,922 for females. The per capita income for the CDP was $25,765. About 4.0% of families and 5.1% of the population were below the poverty line, including 4.4% of those under age 18 and 3.7% of those age 65 or over.
