= Lis Wiehl =

American legal scholar

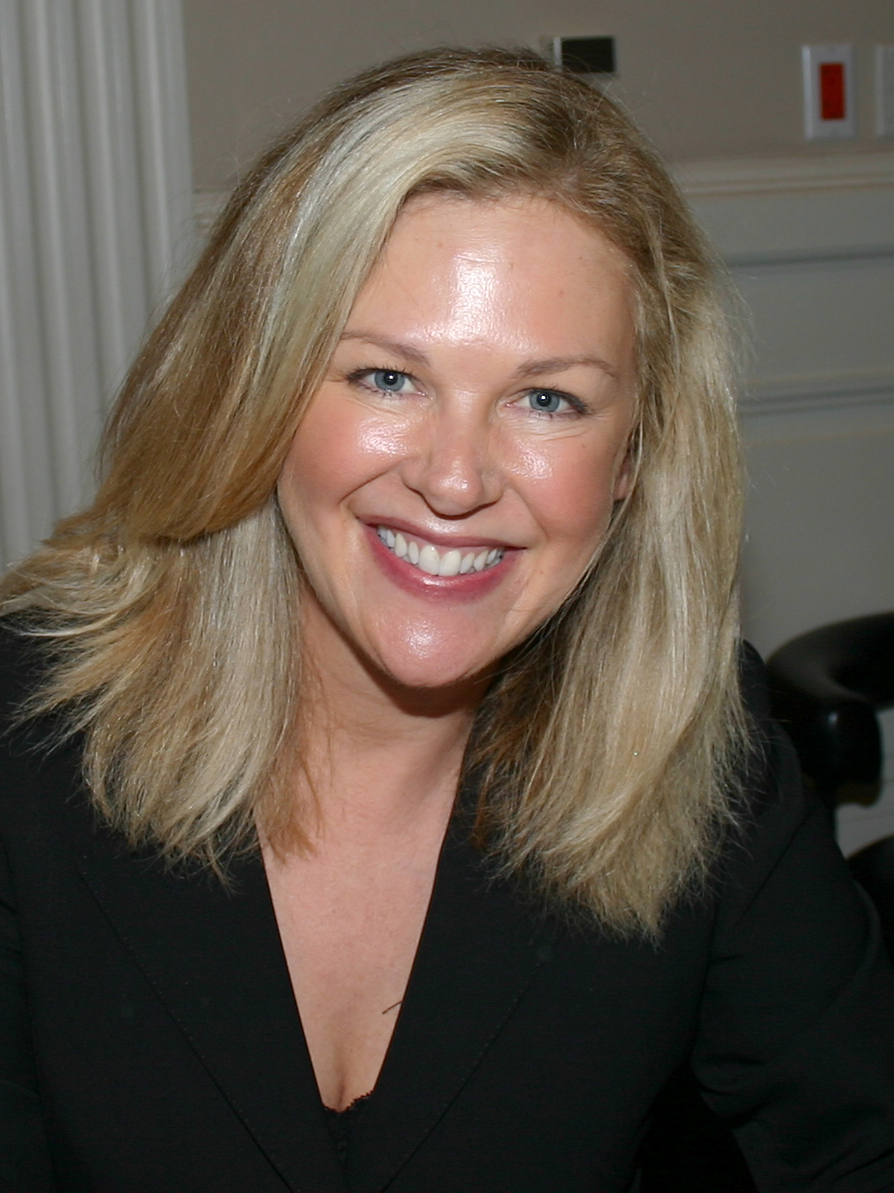
- Wiehl in 2006
- Born: August 19, 1961 (age 64); Yakima, Washington, U.S.
- Education: Barnard College (1983); University of Queensland (1985); Harvard Law School (1987)
- Occupations: Television personality, legal expert, author, radio & podcast host, lawyer
- Website: http://www.liswiehlbooks.com/

Lis Wiehl (born August 19, 1961) is a New York Times bestselling American author of fiction and nonfiction books, and a legal analyst. She is the author of twenty books, including, most recently, A Spy in Plain Sight: The Inside Story of the FBI and Robert Hanssen―America's Most Damaging Russian Spy, published by Pegasus Books.

After working at NBC News and National Public Radio's All Things Considered, Wiehl moved to the Fox News Channel (FNC) where she served as a legal analyst and reporter for over fifteen years, appearing on numerous FNC shows. She is a regular commentator for CNN and also appears often on CBS, NPR and other news outlets.

Wiehl earned her Juris Doctor from Harvard Law School, her Master of Arts in literature from the University of Queensland, and a bachelor's degree from Barnard College.

== Early life and education ==
Wiehl was born in Yakima, Washington, and graduated from West Valley High School in Yakima. She received a bachelor's degree from Barnard College in 1983, a Master of Arts in literature from the University of Queensland in 1985, and a Juris Doctor from Harvard Law School in 1987.

== Career ==
After graduating from Harvard Law School, Wiehl practiced law at Perkins Coie, a private law firm in Seattle where she also wrote by-lined articles on legal issues for the New York Times. From there she went on to become a third-generation federal prosecutor (her grandfather and her father — an FBI agent — were also federal prosecutors) in the US Attorney's Office in Seattle. She served as the deputy chief investigative counsel for Democrats on the House Judiciary Committee during President Clinton's impeachment. From 1995 to 2001, she was a tenured law professor at the University of Washington School of Law in Seattle, where she ran the Trial Advocacy Program, which won several national awards during her tenure.

During her time at the University of Washington, Wiehl also stepped deeper into journalism by working as a reporter and legal analyst for NPR's All Things Considered and NBC News. She soon came to be in high demand for her commentary.

From 2001 to 2017, Wiehl was a legal analyst for The Fox News Channel; she appeared weekly on The O'Reilly Factor, Your World with Neil Cavuto, The Kelly File with Megyn Kelly, Lou Dobbs Tonight, and the Imus morning shows. Wiehl also hosted the Legal Lis radio show and the Wiehl of Justice podcast.

In 2005, Wiehl released her first book, Winning Every Time: How to Use the Skills of a Lawyer in the Trials of Your Life. Two years later she released The 51% Minority: How Women Still Are Not Equal and What You Can Do About It which was awarded the 2008 award for Books for a Better Life in the motivational category. Since then, Wiehl has continued to write best-selling books of fiction and non-fiction including, in 2022, A Spy in Plain Sight: The Inside Story of the FBI and Robert Hanssen―America's Most Damaging Russian Spy.

Wiehl was the co-host of WOR Tonight With Joe Concha & Lis Wiehl on 710 WOR and she was also an adjunct professor of law at New York Law School. She continues to appear in the media as a legal expert and commentator for organizations including CNN, CBS, NBC, and NPR among others. Lis Wiehl lectures at colleges and universities, appears as a keynote speaker, and speaks at bookstores, conferences, and literary festivals.

== Bill O'Reilly settlement ==
Wiehl made sexual harassment allegations against Bill O'Reilly in early 2017 and received a $32 million settlement from him. Fox News was not a party to this settlement and regarded it as a personal issue between O'Reilly and Wiehl. They claim they were not informed of the amount of money involved. Wiehl signed an affidavit on January 17, 2017, stating that she and O'Reilly had settled their dispute. Her allegations and affidavit referred to repeated sexual harassment, a nonconsensual sexual relationship, and sexually explicit e-mails that O'Reilly had sent to her. O'Reilly claims that he forwarded these e-mails to Wiehl, who was working as his personal lawyer, as part of a process where he would forward any threatening e-mails he received to his lawyers.

== Books ==
=== Stand-alone Non-fiction ===
- A Spy in Plain Sight, Pegasus Books (May 3, 2022) ISBN 978-1639361717

=== The Hunting Series (Non-fiction Series) ===
- Hunting The Unabomber, Nashville: Thomas Nelson Publishers-Fiction (April 28, 2020) ISBN 978-0718092122
- Hunting Charles Manson, HarperCollins (June 5, 2018) ISBN 978-0718092085

=== Erica Sparks Series ===
- The Separatists, Nashville: Thomas Nelson Publishers-Fiction (June 27, 2017) ISBN 978-0718037697
- The Candidate, Nashville: Thomas Nelson Publishers-Fiction (October 4, 2016) ISBN 978-0718037680
- The Newsmakers, Nashville: Thomas Nelson Publishers-Fiction (January 19, 2016) ISBN 0718037677

=== Stand-alone fiction ===
- Snapshot, Nashville: Thomas Nelson Publishers-Fiction (January 14, 2014) ISBN 1401689523

=== Triple Threat Series ===
- Face of Betrayal, Nashville: Thomas Nelson Publishers-Fiction (April 7, 2009) ISBN 1595548173
- Hand of Fate, Nashville: Thomas Nelson Publishers-Fiction (April 6, 2010) ISBN 1595547061
- Heart of Ice, Nashville: Thomas Nelson Publishers-Fiction (April 5, 2011) ISBN 159554707X
- Eyes of Justice, Nashville: Thomas Nelson Publishers-Fiction (April 3, 2012) ISBN 1595547088

=== The East Salem Trilogy ===
- Waking Hours, Nashville: Thomas Nelson Publishers-Fiction (October 4, 2011) ISBN 1595549404
- Darkness Rising, Nashville: Thomas Nelson Publishers-Fiction (October 2, 2012) ISBN 1595549439
- Fatal Tide, Nashville: Thomas Nelson Publishers-Fiction (September 17, 2013) ISBN 1595549463

=== Mia Quinn Mysteries ===
- A Matter of Trust, Nashville: Thomas Nelson Publishers-Fiction (March 19, 2013) ISBN 159554903X
- A Deadly Business, Nashville: Thomas Nelson Publishers-Fiction (June 10, 2014) ISBN 1595549048
- Lethal Beauty, Nashville: Thomas Nelson Publishers-Fiction (March 3, 2015) ISBN 1595549056

=== Nonfiction ===
- Winning Every Time: How to Use the Skills of a Lawyer in the Trials of Your Life, New York: Ballantine Books (April 26, 2005) ISBN 0345469208
- The 51% Minority: How Women Still Are Not Equal and What You Can Do About It, New York: Ballantine Books (February 27, 2007) ISBN 0345469216
- The Truth Advantage: The 7 Keys to a Happy and Fulfilling Life, Wiley (November 29, 2011) ISBN 1118025156
