= Cary Conklin =

American football player (born 1968)

No. 12, 6
- Position: Quarterback

Personal information
- Born: February 29, 1968 (age 58); Yakima, Washington, U.S.
- Listed height: 6 ft 4 in (1.93 m)
- Listed weight: 225 lb (102 kg)

Career information
- High school: Eisenhower (Yakima)
- College: Washington
- NFL draft: 1990: 4th round, 86th overall pick

Career history
- Washington Redskins (1990–1993); Philadelphia Eagles (1995)*; San Francisco 49ers (1995)
- * Offseason or practice squad member only

Awards and highlights
- Super Bowl champion (XXVI)

Career NFL statistics
- Passing attempts: 101
- Passing completions: 52
- Completion percentage: 51.5%
- TD–INT: 5–3
- Passing yards: 560
- Passer rating: 72.2
- Stats at Pro Football Reference

Cary Lee Conklin (born February 29, 1968) is an American former professional football player who was a quarterback in the National Football League (NFL) for the Washington Redskins and the San Francisco 49ers.

Born and raised in Yakima, Washington, Conklin graduated from its Eisenhower High School in 1986. He played college football for the Washington Huskies in Seattle under head coach Don James and was selected in the fourth round of the 1990 NFL draft with the 86th overall pick.

Conklin saw the most action in three games during the 1993 season, after starter Mark Rypien tore a knee ligament in the second quarter of a 17-10 loss to the Phoenix Cardinals. In that game, Conklin completed 16 of 29 passes for 169 yards, a touchdown, and an interception. For the next two weeks, Conklin was the starter, but the Redskins lost both games. In the first, he threw for a career-high 218 yards and three touchdowns (against two interceptions); in the second, he was 109 yards with no touchdowns or interceptions before being replaced by Rich Gannon. Conklin was unhappy at the benching, and was listed as inactive for the next two games.

In 1995, he was a San Francisco 49ers backup, seeing limited action in two games.

In 2003, Conklin became a scout for the Redskins.

== See also ==
- Washington Huskies football statistical leaders
