= List of mayors of Yakima, Washington =

The following is a list of mayors of the city of Yakima, Washington state, United States. The city was named "North Yakima" from 1886 through 1918, when its name changed to "Yakima."

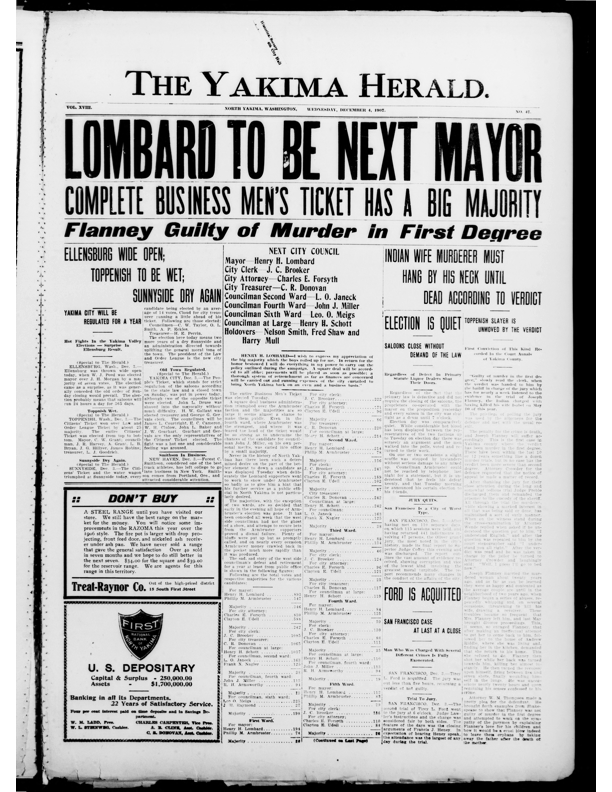
Yakima Herald newspaper, 1907, announcing mayoral election results

- Edward Whitson, c.1886, 1887
- T.J.V. Clark, c.1886
- Fred R. Reed, c.1889
- A. H. Reynolds, 1890 (acting mayor)
- R. K. Nichols, c.1890
- Albert B. Weed, c.1891
- William F. Prosser, c.1893
- W. A. Cox, 1893 (acting mayor)
- Wm. H. Redmon, c.1894, 1900
- O. A. Fechter, c.1897, 1902, 1904, 1907
- A. J. Shaw, c.1903
- Walter J. Reed, c.1906
- Henry H. Lombard, c.1908
- Philip M. Armbruster, c.1909
- Henry H. Schott, 1910-1911
- Andrew Jackson Splawn, c.1911
- Jos. F. Barton, c.1915
- Forrest H. Sweet, c.1917
- R.D. Rovig, c.1920
- Wm. B. Dudley, c.1923
- W.W. Stratton, c.1929
- H.C. Temple, c.1934
- E.B. Riley, c.1937
- A.W. Mogren, c.1942-1945
- N.K. Buck, c.1947
- G.W. Burns, c.1950-1954
- C.H. Behnke, c.1956
- Kenneth Schutt, 1956 (acting mayor)
- Joe K. Alderson, c.1956
- Thomas C. Bostic, c.1959
- John M. Larson, c.1962
- Bert Broad, c.1972
- Betty L. Edmondson, c.1976
- Lynn A. Carmichael, c.1982
- Clarence C. Barnett, c.1984
- Henry C. Beauchamp Jr., c.1986
- Patricia A. Berndt, c.1988
- Lynn Buchanan, c.1996
- John Puccinelli, c.1998
- Mary Place, c.2001
- Paul P. George, c.2004
- Dave Edler, 2006-2010
- Micah Cawley, c.2010
- Avina Gutiérrez, c.2016
- Kathy Coffey, 2016-2020
- Patricia Byers, c.2020, 2024-2026
- Janice Deccio, c.2022-2024
- Matt Brown, 2026-present

== See also ==
- Yakima history
- City government in Washington (state)
