= Selah High School =

Public school in Selah, Washington, United States

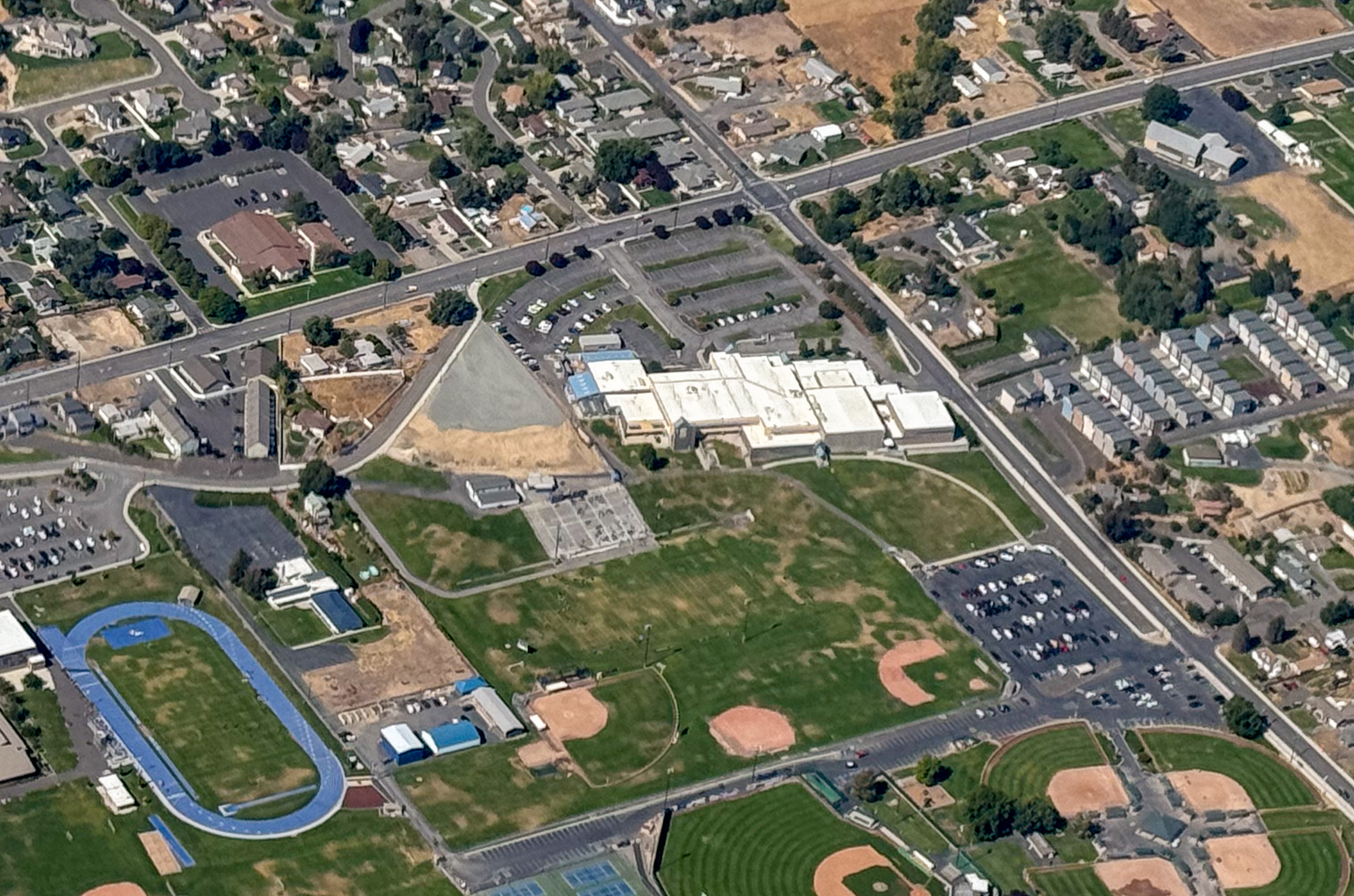
- Aerial view. Selah Middle School's blue track is visible to the left.

Location
- 801 North First Street; Selah, Washington 98942; United States
- Coordinates: 46°39′51″N 120°31′42″W

Information
- Type: Public
- School district: Selah School District
- NCES School ID: 530777001282
- Principal: Colton Monti
- Grades: 9-12
- Enrollment: 1,124 (2023-2024)
- Student to teacher ratio: 66.80 (FTE)
- Campus: Suburb
- Colors: Blue, Gold & White
- Athletics: WIAA - 2A
- Athletics conference: CWAC
- Mascot: Vikings
- Rivals: Ellensburg High School East Valley High School West Valley High School
- Website: selahschools.org/SHS

Selah High School is a public high school located in Selah, Washington, United States, serving students in grades 9–12. It is part of the Selah School District and enrolls approximately 1000 students yearly.

Selah excels in its excellent academics, Career Technical Programs (FCCLA, FFA, TSA) as well as in its sports. The Volleyball and Baseball programs are among the best in their state at any classification. All other Selah sports also compete at a very high level. Selah offers an assortment of classes to prepare kids for their future and takes pride in helping kids achieve their goals.

== Notable alumni ==
- Garret Dillahunt, actor, Deadwood, ER, Terminator: The Sarah Connor Chronicles
- Craig Kupp, former NFL player
- Carter Young, MLB player
