= Reedy Berg =

American politician

Member-elect of the Washington House of Representatives from the 15th district
- Assuming office January 2027
- Succeeding: Jeremie Dufault

Personal details
- Party: Republican

Reedy Berg is an American politician. A member of the Republican Party, he is the member-elect for the 15th district of the Washington House of Representatives.
