= Steele Venters =

American basketball player (born 2001)

No. 11 – Washington Huskies
- Position: Shooting guard / small forward
- Conference: Big Ten Conference

Personal information
- Born: May 16, 2001 (age 25)
- Listed height: 6 ft 7 in (2.01 m)
- Listed weight: 200 lb (91 kg)

Career information
- High school: Ellensburg (Ellensburg, Washington)
- College: Eastern Washington (2020–2023); Gonzaga (2025–2026); Washington (2026–present)

Career highlights
- Big Sky Player of the Year (2023); First-team All-Big Sky (2023); Second-team All-Big Sky (2022)

Steele Venters (born May 16, 2001) is an American college basketball player for the Washington Huskies of the Big Ten Conference. He previously played for the Eastern Washington Eagles and Gonzaga Bulldogs.

== High school career ==
Venters grew up in Ellensburg, Washington, the son of Wade and Erin Venters. His father played professional basketball overseas. Venters attended Ellensburg High School. As a senior, he led Ellensburg to a 16–6 record and a Central Washington Athletic Conference title, averaging 23 points, eight rebounds, and five assists per game. Venters was a first-team Associated Press 2A All-State selection and scored over 1,200 points in his high school career. He committed to play college basketball at Eastern Washington.

== College career ==
Venters redshirted his freshman season. He averaged 3.6 points, 1.4 rebounds and 0.7 assists per game as a redshirt freshman. As a redshirt sophomore, Venters averaged 16.7 points and 3.9 rebounds per game. He was named to the Second Team All-Big Sky. Venters earned Big Sky Player of the Year honors as a junior.

On March 31, 2023, Venters announced his intention to enter the 2023 NBA draft while also maintaining his college eligibility and entering the NCAA transfer portal at the same time. On April 7, 2023, Venters announced that he would be transferring to Gonzaga. After missing multiple seasons with ACL injuries, he averaged 5.0 points, 1.3 rebounds and 1.0 assist per game in the 2025-26 season. Venters entered the transfer portal after the season.

== Career statistics ==
Legend
| GP | Games played | GS | Games started | MPG | Minutes per game |
| FG% | Field goal percentage | 3P% | 3-point field goal percentage | FT% | Free throw percentage |
| RPG | Rebounds per game | APG | Assists per game | SPG | Steals per game |
| BPG | Blocks per game | PPG | Points per game | **Bold** | Career high |

=== College ===
| Year | Team | GP | GS | MPG | FG% | 3P% | FT% | RPG | APG | SPG | BPG | PPG |
|---|---|---|---|---|---|---|---|---|---|---|---|---|
| 2019–20 | Eastern Washington | Redshirt | | | | | | | | | | |
| 2020–21 | Eastern Washington | 17 | 0 | 9.5 | .423 | .414 | .833 | 1.4 | .7 | .3 | .3 | 3.6 |
| 2021–22 | Eastern Washington | 33 | 33 | **33.7** | .456 | **.434** | **.847** | **3.9** | **2.2** | **.9** | **.7** | **16.7** |
| 2022–23 | Eastern Washington | **34** | **34** | 31.5 | **.457** | .371 | .845 | 2.8 | 1.5 | .8 | .4 | 15.3 |
| 2023–24 | Gonzaga | Redshirt | | | | | | | | | | |
| 2024–25 | Gonzaga | Redshirt | | | | | | | | | | |
| 2025–26 | Gonzaga | 27 | 10 | 15.1 | .386 | .367 | .833 | 1.3 | 1.0 | .6 | .1 | 5.0 |
| Career | | 111 | 77 | 24.8 | .446 | .396 | .845 | 2.5 | 1.5 | .7 | .4 | 11.4 |
