= Ellensburg School District =

School district in Washington, United States

Address
- 1300 East Third Avenue Ellensburg, Washington, 98926; United States

District information
- Type: Public
- Grades: PreK–12
- NCES District ID: 5302460

Students and staff
- Students: 3,250 (2022–2023)
- Teachers: 189.7 (FTE)
- Staff: 207 (FTE)
- Student–teacher ratio: 15.7:1

Other information
- Website: www.esd401.org

Ellensburg School District 401 is a public school district headquartered in Ellensburg, Washington. It serves the city of Ellensburg and surrounding areas. As of the 2022-2023 school year, the district has an enrollment of 3,250 students. The superintendent is Troy Tornow.

== Schools ==
=== High schools ===
- Ellensburg High School
- Ellensburg Choice Schools
  - This school is houses an alternative high school program serving Grades 9-12, ALE (Alternative Learning Experience) program, Ellensburg Virtual Academy, and the Ellensburg Parent Partnership Program. The program is located on the campus of Ellensburg High School.

=== Middle school ===
- Morgan Middle School

=== Primary schools ===
- Ida-Nason Aronica Elementary School
- Lincoln Elementary
- Mount Stuart Elementary
- Valley View Elementary

=== Early learning ===
- Early Learning Center
