= West Valley High School (Yakima, Washington) =

Coordinates: 46°34′26″N 120°38′10″W

- 9800 Zier Rd., Yakima, Washington 98908; United States

Information
- Type: Public
- Established: 1955
- School district: West Valley School District No. 208
- Principal: Ben McMurry
- Teaching staff: 66.63 (FTE)
- Grades: 9-12
- Student to teacher ratio: 23.27
- Campus: Rural Area
- Colors: Scarlet, Columbia Blue & White
- Athletics: WIAA - 4A
- Athletics conference: Columbia Basin Big Nine
- Mascot: Rams
- Rivals: Eisenhower High School Selah High School
- Website: Official website

West Valley High School is a public secondary school in Yakima, Washington, United States, in the West Valley School District. The school enrolls approximately 1,500 students and services grades 9-12.

== History ==
West Valley High School was constructed in 1955, and refurbished in the 1980s. The facilities were intended for only 400 students, but were occupied by more than 1100. A levy proposed in May 2006 sought funding for construction of a new, state-of-the-art high school near the original school.

=== New campus ===
A new school building was completed in August 2009. The new structure is two-story, steel frame, and masonry construction that includes: vo-tech space, agriculture science lab, eight science rooms, wood and construction shop, metal and manufacturing shops, welding labs, media center, seven computer labs, art room, business education labs, JROTC room, music/choir room, 60 general classrooms, administration, counseling areas, home and family life lab, special needs areas, and a serving kitchen all organized around central commons and outdoor student plaza areas. In addition, the design includes an auditorium with a seating capacity of 500, a stage with full rigging for lighting and curtains, plus full sound system.

=== Freshman Campus ===
After the completion of the new campus, construction crews remodeled the old campus. The exterior buildings of the school, including the portables, were demolished, except for the auto shop. Only the main building of the campus was kept and remodeled, including a new library and computer lab in a portion of the commons/cafeteria. The remodeled campus was named West Valley High School: Freshman Campus. The building was completed for the beginning in 2010, before the start of the new school year.

In Fall 2019, the freshman class was moved to the main building so the Freshman Campus building could be used to house Apple Valley Elementary School and Summitview Elementary School while their new buildings were being constructed. All West Valley High School students grades 9-12 now attend school in the main building.

In Fall 2021, Apple Valley Elementary School and Summitview Elementary School moved into their new buildings. The Freshman Campus was then transformed into the Innovation Center for West Valley School District.

== Athletics ==
West Valley High School is a 4A school and competes in the hybrid 3A / 4A Columbia Basin Big Nine League, which is a part of the Washington Interscholastic Activities Association. Its mascot is the ram and its colors are scarlet red, Columbia blue, and white.

== Notable alumni ==
- Reina Almon, Miss Washington's Outstanding Teen 2009 and Miss Washington 2013
- Chris Magruder, former MLB baseball outfielder (Texas Rangers, Cleveland Indians, Milwaukee Brewers)
- Josh Pearce, former MLB baseball pitcher (St. Louis Cardinals)
- Lis Wiehl, author and legal analyst for Fox News
- Shane Lemieux, current NFL offensive guard New Orleans Saints
