= William F. Prosser =

American politician

William Farrand Prosser
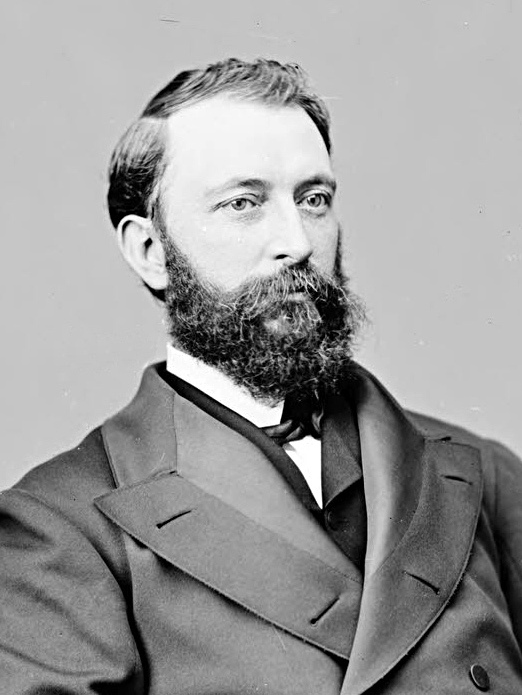
- Prosser during his tenure in the U.S. Congress

City Treasurer of Seattle
- In office 1908–1910

Mayor of North Yakima, Washington
- In office 1890-1903

Member of the U.S. House of Representatives from Tennessee's 5th district
- In office March 4, 1869 – March 3, 1871
- Preceded by: John Trimble
- Succeeded by: Edward Isaac Golladay

Member of the Tennessee House of Representatives
- In office 1867-1869

Personal details
- Born: March 16, 1834 Williamsport, Pennsylvania, U.S.
- Died: September 23, 1911 (aged 77) Seattle, Washington, U.S.
- Party: Republican
- Spouse: Flora Thornton Prosser
- Children: William Thornton Prosser; Margaret Prosser; Mildred Prosser
- Profession: Teacher, miner, soldier, farmer, publisher, politician

William Farrand Prosser (March 16, 1834 – September 23, 1911) was an American politician who served in the United States House of Representatives representing Tennessee, and was a Union Colonel in the American Civil War.

== Early years ==
Prosser was born on March 16, 1834, in Williamsport, Pennsylvania, the son of David and Rachel Williams Prosser, Welsh immigrants. His family moved to Johnstown, Pennsylvania, when he was very young. In Johnstown, he received a limited formal education, but went on to teach school and study law although he never practiced. He moved to California in 1854, where he engaged in mining.

== Civil War years ==
Prosser returned to Pennsylvania in 1861 upon the outbreak of the Civil War to enter the Union Army. He was promoted through the ranks to Colonel, and served throughout the war. Prosser saw action in many battles, including the Battle of Shiloh, the Battle of Stones River, and the Siege of Knoxville. Prosser was briefly a prisoner of war in 1862.

== Tennessee years ==
After the war Prosser settled on a farm near Nashville, Tennessee, where he was elected to the Tennessee House of Representatives, 1867–1869. He was elected as a Republican to the Forty-first United States Congress in 1869, and served from March 4, 1869, to March 3, 1871. He was postmaster of Nashville 1872–1875 and a director of the Tennessee, Edgefield & Kentucky Railroad. Prosser was appointed in 1872 as one of the State commissioners to the Centennial Exposition at Philadelphia and was sent on a special mission in 1873 to assist in arranging participation of European countries in the exposition. He published the Nashville Republican for several years.

== Washington years ==
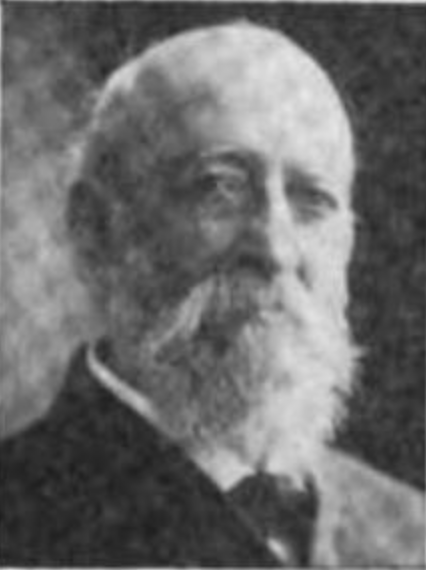
A later portrait of Prosser

In 1879, Prosser was appointed by President Rutherford B. Hayes as special agent of the United States Department of the Interior for Oregon, Washington, and Idaho. He moved to Washington in the same year. He married Flora Louise Thornton in Seattle on April 6, 1880, and settled in the Yakima River valley area in 1882, where he founded the town of Prosser, Washington. He had three children, William Thornton Prosser, Margaret Helen Prosser, and Mildred Cyrenia Prosser. He was a delegate at the first Washington State Constitutional Convention in 1889.

Prosser was one of the founders of the Washington State Historical Society, which he served as president for a time. In 1903, he authored a two volume history titled A History of the Puget Sound Country.

He also served as chairman of the State harbor line commission, mayor of North Yakima (1890–1903), and city treasurer of Seattle 1908–1910.

== Death ==
Prosser died September 23, 1911 (age 77 years). He is interred at Lake View Cemetery, Seattle, Washington.

== See also ==
- List of mayors of Yakima, Washington

U.S. House of Representatives
Preceded by John Trimble	Member of the U.S. House of Representatives from Tennessee's 5th congressional district 1869–1871	Succeeded by Edward I. Golladay
