= Eisenhower High School (Yakima, Washington) =

Dwight D. Eisenhower High School
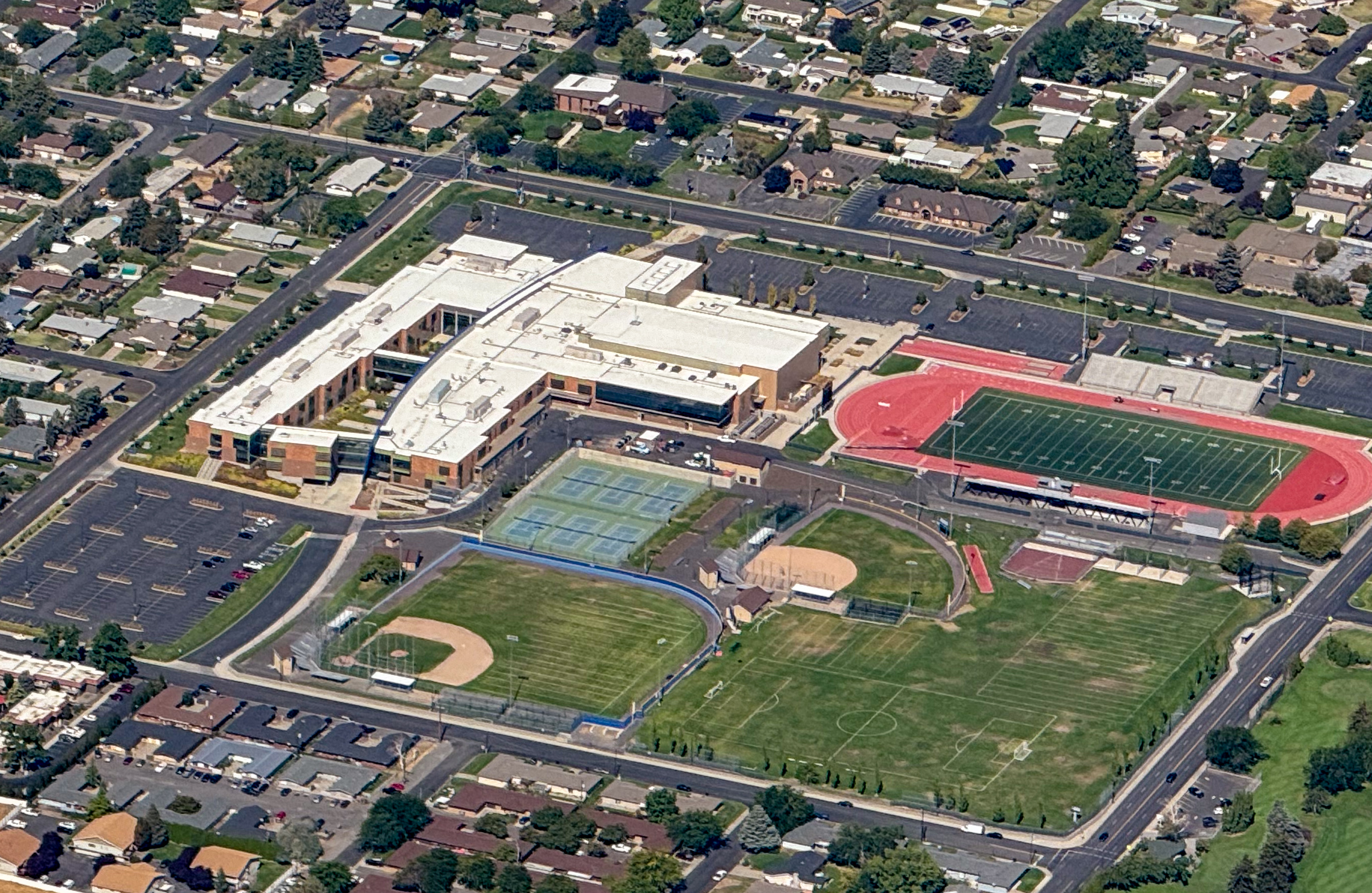
- Overhead view of school

Location
- 611 S. 44th Avenue; Yakima, Washington 98908; United States; 46°35′25″N 120°33′52″W

Information
- Type: Public Secondary
- Motto: Go Fight Win Cadets/We are Ike
- Established: 1957; 69 years ago
- School district: Yakima School District
- Category: Secondary Education
- NCES School ID: 531011001690
- Principal: Eric Diener
- Grades: 9-12
- Enrollment: 2,258 (2024-2025)
- Campus: Urban Area
- Colors: Red, White & Blue
- Athletics: WIAA - 4A
- Athletics conference: Columbia Basin Big Nine
- Mascot: Cadets
- Nickname: The Mighty Cadets
- Rivals: A.C. Davis High School West Valley High School
- Newspaper: 5 star
- Yearbook: Reveille
- Website: eisenhower.ysd7.org

Dwight David Eisenhower High School (/ˌaɪzɪnˈhaʊ.ər/) is located in Yakima, Washington, United States. It is named after U.S. President Dwight D. Eisenhower. It is one of five high schools in the Yakima School District, the others being Davis High School, Stanton Academy, Yakima Online, and Yakima Valley Technical Skills Center. Students and community members often refer to the school as "Ike."

== History ==
The original Eisenhower High School was constructed and established in 1957 following the split of Yakima High School, now Davis High School. The 1957 campus featured a T-shaped layout situated at the bottom of the property with a combined capacity for approximately 1,400 students.

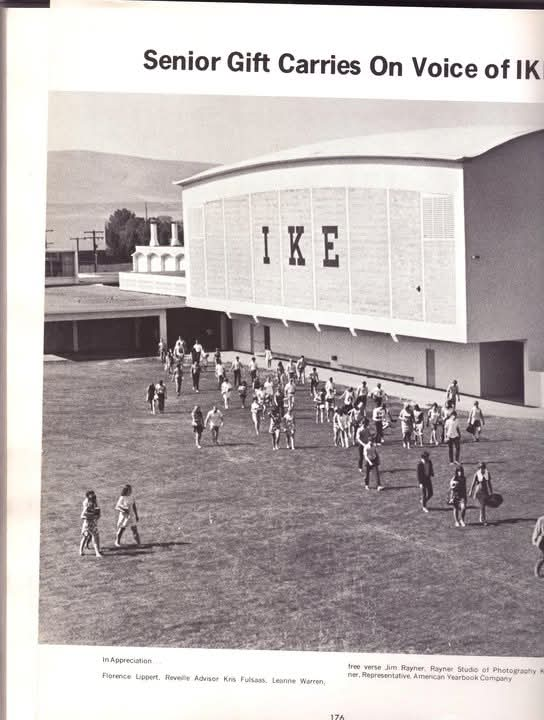
Old Eisenhower high school gym in 1970 after installing the "IKE" letters on the gym

The same year that Eisenhower opened in 1957, Congressman Hal Holmes praised the school’s patriotic motif, stating, **"This choice of such a patriotic motif is indicative of the fine spirit there is in the Yakima schools, and I hasten to congratulate you for fostering it."** He also praised the school's colors, the Cadet mascot, and the creation of the Five Star Journal, 13 years after the original campus opened, Eisenhowers Senior Class of 70 donated metal large letters to the school, Spelling out "I K E", The Yakima school district was hesitant to let the letters on to the gym at the time due to Davis and ike sharing it until Davis's new gym was completed in 1974, because at that time Davis no longer had a safe gym due to its current gyms age, so the students at Eisenhower went to congress and got the approval, forcing the district to comply and put the letters on the gym, and the letters over time became a landmark of the school, in 1997, the beautification project added trees, repainted the "IKE" letters on the gym, added a new hall to make walking around the campus faster, and implemented other measures to fix the aging campus. By 2008 the school was facing issues from a growing number of students and deteriorating facilities. After a 2009 bond, a replacement was planned, which was finished in 2013. The old campus area was repurposed for sports facilities. The old sign, featuring a cadet mural, was moved down to mark where the old office building stood.

The new building has won several awards: the AIA Central Washington Merit Award, the Learning by Design Outstanding Project Award, the MIW Excellence in Masonry Design Honor Award, the Inland Northwest AGC Build Northwest Award, and the Robert Faser Masonry Design Award.

=== KDA Architecture and Graham Construction Lawsuit ===
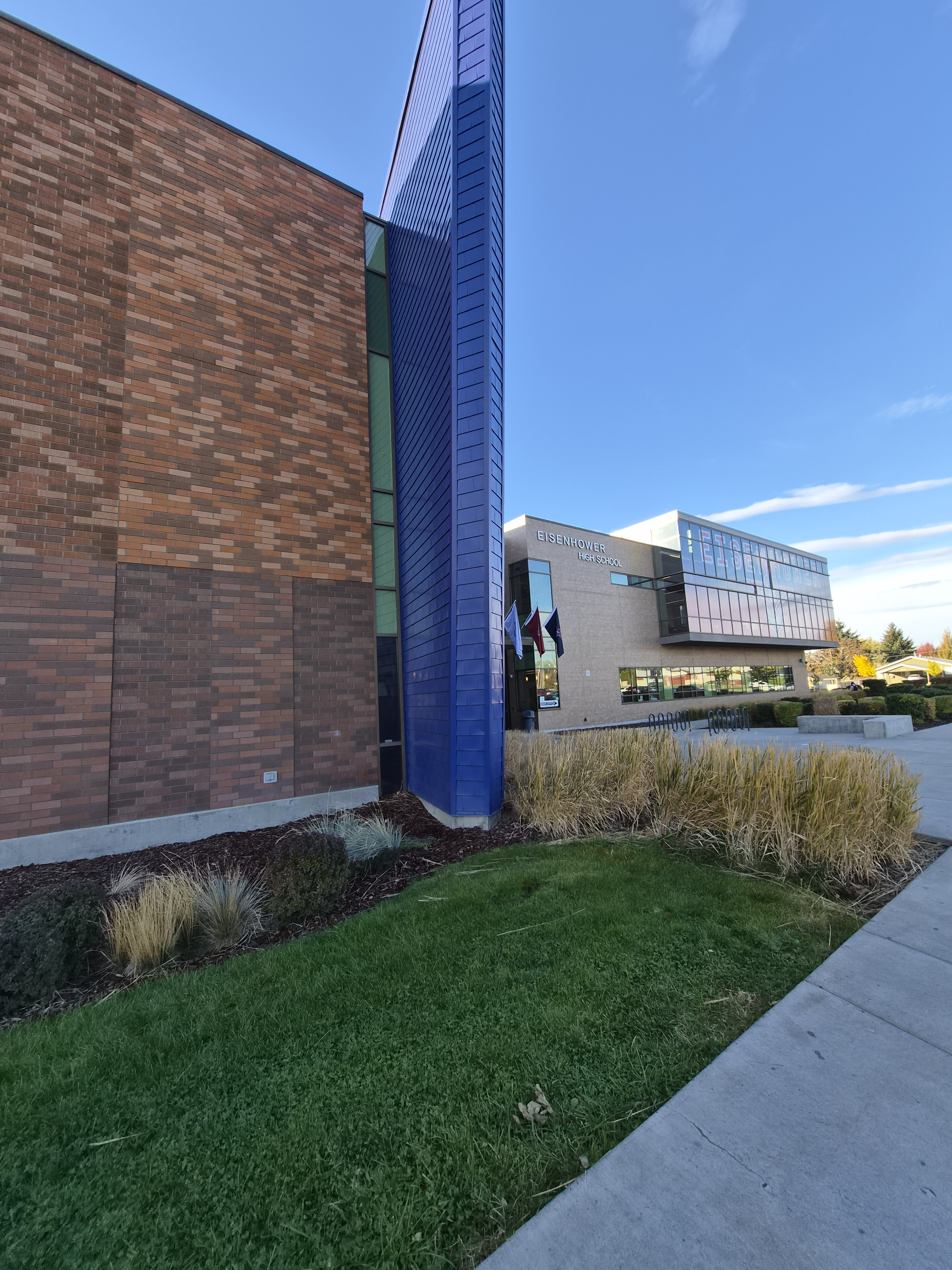
Eisenhower high school in 2025

Six years after the new building opened in August 2013, the Yakima School District filed a lawsuit against KDA Architecture because of design issues and property damage to the building's signature blue wall, including 23 of 26 windows leaking water leading to nontoxic mold.

== Academics ==
Eisenhower High School has an 82% graduation rate and is ranked 174th among 884 public high schools in the state of Washington.

== Enrollment ==
As of 2020, there were approximately 2,100 students enrolled. 73% of enrolled students are of a minority race, most of which are Hispanic.

== Notable alumni ==
- Cary Conklin, NFL quarterback
- Dave Edler, MLB infielder
- Scott Hatteberg, MLB catcher and first baseman
- Leann Hunley, actress
- Paige Mackenzie, LPGA player and television broadcaster
- Kyle MacLachlan, actor
- Mitch Meluskey, MLB catcher
- Kurt Schulz, NFL defensive back
- Bob Wells, MLB pitcher
- Christopher Wiehl, actor
- Elaine Ostrander, scientist
