= East Valley High School (Yakima, Washington) =

Location
- 1900 Beaudry Road, Yakima, Washington; United States; 46°34′30″N 120°24′19″W

Information
- Type: Public
- School district: East Valley School District
- Superintendent: Russ Hill
- Principal: Ryan McDaniel
- Grades: 9-12
- Enrollment: 1,045 (2023-2024)
- Campus: Rural Area
- Colors: Black, white and red
- Athletics: WIAA - 2A
- Athletics conference: CWAC
- Mascot: Red Devils
- Rivals: Selah High School Ellensburg High School
- Website: eastvalleyhigh.evsd90.org

East Valley High School, located in Yakima, Washington, is a high school that serves 830 students in grades 9–12. From 2012 to 2016, the principal was Dorthea Say and from 2016 to 2021, Kayla Crowe. The principal is now Ryan McDaniel, since 2021.

== Demographics ==
50% of the students are white, while 45% are Hispanic, 1% are American Indian, 2% are Asian and 1% are black. And 1% are two or more races.
