= Kurt Schulz =

American football player (born 1968)

No. 24, 45
- Position: Safety

Personal information
- Born: December 12, 1968 (age 57); Wenatchee, Washington, U.S.
- Listed height: 6 ft 1 in (1.85 m)
- Listed weight: 208 lb (94 kg)

Career information
- High school: Yakima (WA) Eisenhower
- College: Eastern Washington
- NFL draft: 1992: 7th round, 165th overall pick

Career history
- Buffalo Bills (1992–1999); Detroit Lions (2000–2001)

Career NFL statistics
- Tackles: 434
- Interceptions: 30
- Forced fumbles: 5
- Stats at Pro Football Reference

Kurt Erich Schulz (born December 12, 1968) is an American former professional football player who was a safety in the National Football League (NFL). He played 10 years, eight for the Buffalo Bills, and two for the Detroit Lions. He played college football for the Eastern Washington Eagles.

== Career ==
Schulz began playing football in his junior year at Dwight D. Eisenhower High School in Yakima, Washington, after notable successes in soccer and track lead coaches and football players there to request he join the team. He had an immediate impact on the team playing the safety position and returning punts for the Cadets. He subsequently suffered a serious on-field leg injury but was still able to be noticed by and recruited to Eastern Washington University to play football in 1987. Following a successful career at safety for the Eagles, Schulz was selected by the Buffalo Bills in the seventh round of the 1992 NFL draft.

After being let go by the Lions in 2001, Schulz worked for Merrill Lynch.
