= Bryan Sandlin =

American politician

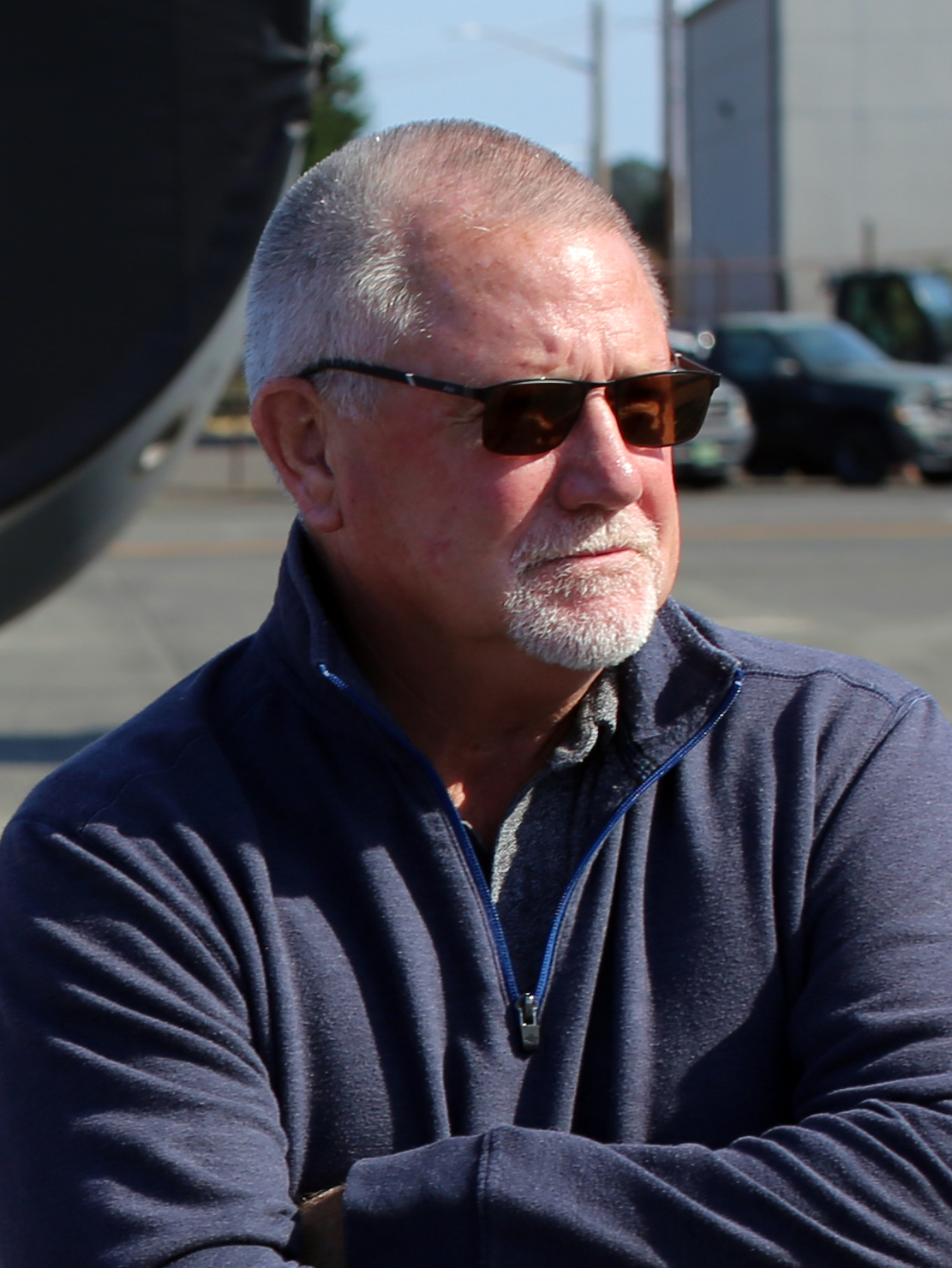

Member of the Washington House of Representatives from the 15th district
- In office January 9, 2023 – January 13, 2025
- Preceded by: Jeremie Dufault
- Succeeded by: Jeremie Dufault

Personal details
- Party: Republican
- Spouse: Debbie Sandlin
- Education: Washington State University
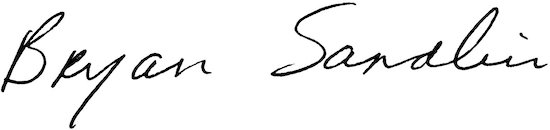
- Signature

Bryan Sandlin is an American politician. He served as a Republican member for the 15th district, Position 2 in the Washington House of Representatives.
