= Ellensburg High School =

Location
- 1203 E Capitol; Ellensburg, Washington 98926; United States; 46°59′35″N 120°31′40″W

Information
- Type: Public secondary
- Established: 1889; 137 years ago
- School district: Ellensburg School District
- NCES School ID: 530246000365
- Principal: Beau Snow
- Teaching staff: 43.33 (FTE)
- Grades: 9-12
- Enrollment: 974 (2023-2024)
- Student to teacher ratio: 22.48
- Campus: Rural Area
- Colors: Navy, and white
- Athletics: WIAA - 2A
- Athletics conference: CWAC
- Mascot: Bulldogs
- Rivals: Selah High School East Valley High School
- Yearbook: Klahiam
- Website: ehs.esd401.org

Ellensburg High School is a secondary school in Ellensburg, Washington, United States, operated by the Ellensburg School District.

== Academics ==
Qualified 11th and 12th grade students may take classes at Central Washington University, and earn both high school and college credit through the Running Start program.

== Notable alumni ==
- Gary Lee Conner - musician, Screaming Trees
- Van Conner - musician, Screaming Trees
- Brian Habib - NFL offensive guard 1989–2001, Super Bowl XXXII (1998) champion, Denver Broncos
- Brian Haley - comedian, actor, and writer
- Ja'Warren Hooker - track athlete
- Mark Lanegan - musician, Screaming Trees
- Mark Pickerel - musician, Screaming Trees
- Kayla Standish - college and Australian basketball player
- Steele Venters - college basketball player; 2023 Big Sky Player of the Year
- Stevin John - children's entertainer, Blippi
