= Yakima School District =

Public school district in Washington, United States

Address
- 104 N 4th Avenue Yakima, Washington, 98902; United States
- Coordinates: 46°36′07″N 120°30′55″W

District information
- Grades: PreK–12
- Superintendent: Trevor Greene
- NCES District ID: 5310110

Other information
- Website: www.ysd7.org

Yakima School District No. 7 is a public school district in Yakima County, Washington, USA and serves the city of Yakima.

As of May 2016, the district had an enrollment of 15,999 students. The student body was over three-quarters Latino in 2016. Four Latinos have been elected to the Yakima School Board since 1999.

== Schools ==
=== High schools ===
- A. C. Davis High School
- D. D. Eisenhower High School
- Stanton Academy
- Yakima Online
- Yakima Valley Technical Skills Center

=== Middle schools ===
- K-8 Virtual
- Franklin Middle School
- Lewis and Clark Middle School
- Washington Middle School
- Wilson Middle School

=== Primary schools ===
- Adams Elementary
- Barge Lincoln Elementary
- Discovery Lab
- Garfield Elementary
- Gilbert Elementary
- Hoover Elementary
- M. L. King Jr. Elementary
- McClure Elementary
- McKinley Elementary
- Nob Hill Elementary
- Ridgeview Elementary
- Robertson Elementary
- Roosevelt Elementary
- Whitney Elementary
