= Josh Pearce =

American baseball player (born 1977)

- Pitcher
- Born: August 20, 1977 (age 48); Yakima, Washington, U.S.
- Batted: Right Threw: Right

MLB debut
- April 20, 2002, for the St. Louis Cardinals

Last MLB appearance
- May 8, 2004, for the St. Louis Cardinals

MLB statistics
- Win–loss record: 0–0
- Earned run average: 5.55
- Strikeouts: 5
- Stats at Baseball Reference

Teams
- St. Louis Cardinals (2002–2004)

Joshua Ray Pearce (born August 20, 1977) is an American former Major League Baseball pitcher who played for the St. Louis Cardinals from 2002 to 2004.

Pearce was drafted by the New York Mets out of West Valley High School in Yakima, Washington in the 1996 Major League Baseball draft, but did not sign. Instead, he attended Portland State University (1998), the University of Arizona and was drafted by the St. Louis Cardinals in the 2nd round of the 1999 Major League Baseball draft. Though not dominant in the minors, he steadily worked his way up the ranks and made his major league debut on April 20, 2002; he pitched 4.2 innings and gave up 3 earned runs, getting a no-decision. In 2004, Pearce pitched in relief for Triple-A Memphis and had a 3.56 ERA in 26 games. In 2005, his last professional season, he pitched for Double-A Springfield and Memphis.
