= A.C. Davis High School (Washington) =

High school in Yakima, Washington, US

Location
- 212 S. 6th Ave. Yakima, Washington; United States; 46.5967°N 120.5163°W

Information
- Type: IB World School high school
- Established: 1884
- School district: Yakima School District
- Principal: Heather Hastie
- Faculty: 102
- Teaching staff: 115.80 (FTE)
- Grades: 9–12
- Enrollment: 2,359 (2024–2025)
- Student to teacher ratio: 20.37
- Campus: Urban Area
- Colors: Black & Orange
- Athletics: WIAA - 4A
- Athletics conference: Columbia Basin Big Nine
- Mascot: Pirates
- Rivals: Eisenhower High School
- Yearbook: Lolomi
- Website: davis.ysd7.org

A.C. Davis High School is a high school in Yakima, Washington, serving students in grades 9–12. It is part of the Yakima School District and has approximately 2,600 students.

== History ==
North Yakima High School (which was renamed Davis High School in 1957 when Eisenhower High School became the second senior high school in Yakima) began classes in 1884, and was housed in the Columbia Building. By 1896, the school's enrollment reached 40 students and classes were relocated to the Central School Building. With an ever-increasing student body, in 1900, the school was once-again relocated to the Lincoln School. In 1905, land was procured on South 7th Avenue and Walnut, with plans to build a new, larger high school. As it turned out, that foresight was well thought out, because after the Lincoln School burned on Jan. 6, 1907, the high school took up temporary residence at the Methodist Church on Fourth Street.

The new school building, which began construction in 1905, was completed in 1908. The new building cost $84,980, had 23 classrooms and increased capacity to 690 students.

Angus Charles Davis served as principal from 1908 through 1913, and was superintendent until 1947. In 1978, after an extensive, thirteen-year remodeling project, which cost upwards of $5 million, the Yakima High School was re-dedicated as Davis High School, in honor of its early principal and long-time superintendent.

One of the keynote speakers at the school's re-dedication was Cathy Douglas Stone, wife of U.S. Supreme Court Justice, William O. Douglas who is, perhaps, Davis's most notable alumnus. Douglas, who played on the basketball team and was valedictorian of his graduating class, went on to teach English at North Yakima High School before becoming a lawyer and, ultimately, a United States Supreme Court justice.

== Plans ==
In May 2009, a $114 million bond was approved by Yakima voters to remodel and renovate area schools. Davis was allocated $42 million of that bond money (plus another $42 million in State-matching funds), to refurbish the school.

=== Principals ===
- Angus Charles Davis, 1908–1913 – first male principal
- Alan Hickman – second male principal
- Frances Wesley Jones
- Clarence Klise
- Forest J. Dollinger, 1913–1914, 1916–1918
- Arthur Church, last principal of Yakima High School
- Donald B. Davidson, first principal of A.C. Davis High School, 1957
- Rolla Gould
- Dr. Warren Dean Starr
- Dr. Raymond Lindley, 1974–1977
- Robert Alexander, 1977–1981
- Owen Hurst, 1981–1985
- Dr. Robert McLaughlin, 1985–1993
- Karen Garrison, 1993–2000 – first female principal
- Jose Vidot, 2000–2002
- Lee Maras, 2002–2007
- Ben Ramirez, 2007–2013
- Ryan McDaniel, 2013–2021
- Dr. Heather Hastie, 2021–present – second female principal

== Academics ==
Davis is the only school in the Yakima Valley to offer the International Baccalaureate Diploma Program for high school juniors and seniors. Every year over one hundred students participate in the International Baccalaureate program at the school. The most involved students take 6 to 7 IB classes their junior and senior years to earn the IB diploma, strengthen their educational background, and earn college credit. However, students can take any number of IB classes related to their educational and personal interests. IB course offerings include: Music, Art, Physics, Chemistry, Biology, Mathematical Methods, Mathematical Studies, History of the Americas, Spanish B (for non-native speakers), Spanish A (for native speakers), French B (non-native speakers), Theory of Knowledge, and English A (for native speakers). Each of these courses lasts for 2 years with the exceptions of Theory of knowledge (2 trimesters) and Physics (1 year).

A plurality of IB students opt to attend the University of Washington, the most academically selective public university in the state, which ranks Davis 19th out of 231 private and public Washington high schools. Every year some students go further afield to attend top-ranked institutions including Ivy League and Stanford Universities. Study abroad and foreign exchange programs are also popular options for graduating seniors.

Students who opt not to participate in the IB program have a myriad of other educational opportunities and career paths. Davis students often participate in the Running Start program at Yakima Valley Community College to earn their high school diploma as well as their associate degree prior to graduation. The ESL (English as a Second Language) program assists Spanish speaking students adjust to an English learning environment.

=== Music ===
Davis offers music programs in the areas of choir, orchestra, and band. The school offers jazz choir, chamber choir, show choir, treble choir, concert choir, three leveled orchestras, two jazz bands, wind ensemble, advanced band, concert band, and two percussion ensembles. In addition the music program offers multiple beginning guitar classes and an IB Music class tied to the Wind Ensemble and Chamber Orchestra respectively. During the course of an average day the music faculty serve around 600 students.

The Davis band and orchestra first came about in 1927 under Avery Olson. The band began with about 20 students, but since then has grown to nearly 200. Each autumn, the A.C. Davis Buccaneer Marching Band prepares a marching show and performs at home football games, as well as local competitions, such as Cavalcade of Bands in Tri-Cities, Washington, and Puget Sound Marching Festival in Everett, Washington. Davis and Eisenhower High School marching bands co-host the Harvest Marching Festival in Yakima, Washington. The A.C. Davis Marching Band has established itself as one of the most competitive groups in the state and the Wind Ensemble was selected as a concert hour performance group at the 2019 NAfME Northwest Division conference in Portland, OR. During the 2019–2020 school year the Davis Band Program was selected as the Northwest Division winner and one of five national finalists for the William P. Foster Award for Excellence in music Title 1 schools.

In the spring, Davis hosts the YVMEA Band, Orchestra, and Choir Festivals for groups around the region. A.C. Davis's concert ensembles regularly receive superior ratings at these contests for their excellence.

Students have been honored as solo musicians as well. At the Washington State Solo and Ensemble competition, Davis High School sends several students to the state level each year in both instrumental and vocal music performance. The Davis percussion ensemble is currently one of the top-ranking musical groups in the state, winning the WIAA State Contest in 2019.

The Davis drumline has performed a student-written half-time shows at basketball games for two years and has done clinics with the Blue Man Group as well as received high rankings at marching band and solo and ensemble competitions.

== Extracurriculars ==
=== Athletics ===
Davis competes athletically against the largest schools in the state by enrollment as a member of the 4A Division of the Washington Interscholastic Activities Association (WIAA) and the Columbia Basin "Big Nine" Athletic Conference. The school supports several interscholastic sports, including: baseball, basketball, bowling, cross-country, cheer, fastpitch softball, football, golf, soccer, swimming and diving, tennis, track, volleyball and wrestling. The Davis Pirates have a long-standing rivalry with cross-town high school, D.D. Eisenhower High (more familiarly known as "Ike"). In 2012, the Davis boys' basketball team won the state 4A basketball championship - the first since 1965.The only wrestling team to go undefeated was in 1972, won the State Championship and was rated very high in the nation.

=== Clubs and activities ===
Currently, there are approximately 36 academic and recreational student clubs at Davis, including MeChA, Knowledge Bowl, FBLA and Lolomi (student yearbook). The yearbook has been called the Lolomi since 1921, but before that was called many different names, including Papoose, Quietus, Potlatch, and Wigwam. These yearbooks are available for viewing at the Yakima Valley Regional Library.

== Noted alumni ==
- Oleta Adams, internationally acclaimed singer and performer
- Jamie Allen, former MLB baseball third baseman (Seattle Mariners)
- Raymond Carver, author
- Don Crow, former MLB baseball catcher (Los Angeles Dodgers)
- William O. Douglas, Supreme Court Justice; a plaque commemorating the fountain and courtyard at Davis High School in his name was dedicated in 1980 by the Class of 1968 and a statue of Douglas was erected in the courtyard in 2005 in his memory
- Joe Hipp, former professional heavyweight boxer
- Cooper Kupp, NFL wide receiver and Super Bowl LVI most valuable player.
- Gary Peacock, jazz double bassist
- Mel Stottlemyre Jr., former MLB baseball pitcher (Kansas City Royals)
- Todd Stottlemyre, former MLB baseball pitcher (Toronto Blue Jays, Oakland Athletics, St. Louis Cardinals, Texas Rangers, Arizona Diamondbacks)
- Taylor Stubblefield, former college football player; set NCAA career receptions mark (325) while at Purdue University
- Willie Turner, sprinter
