= Tri-Cities metropolitan area =

Tri-Cities Metropolitan Area
- Metropolitan Statistical Area
- Kennewick–Richland, WA; Metropolitan Statistical Area
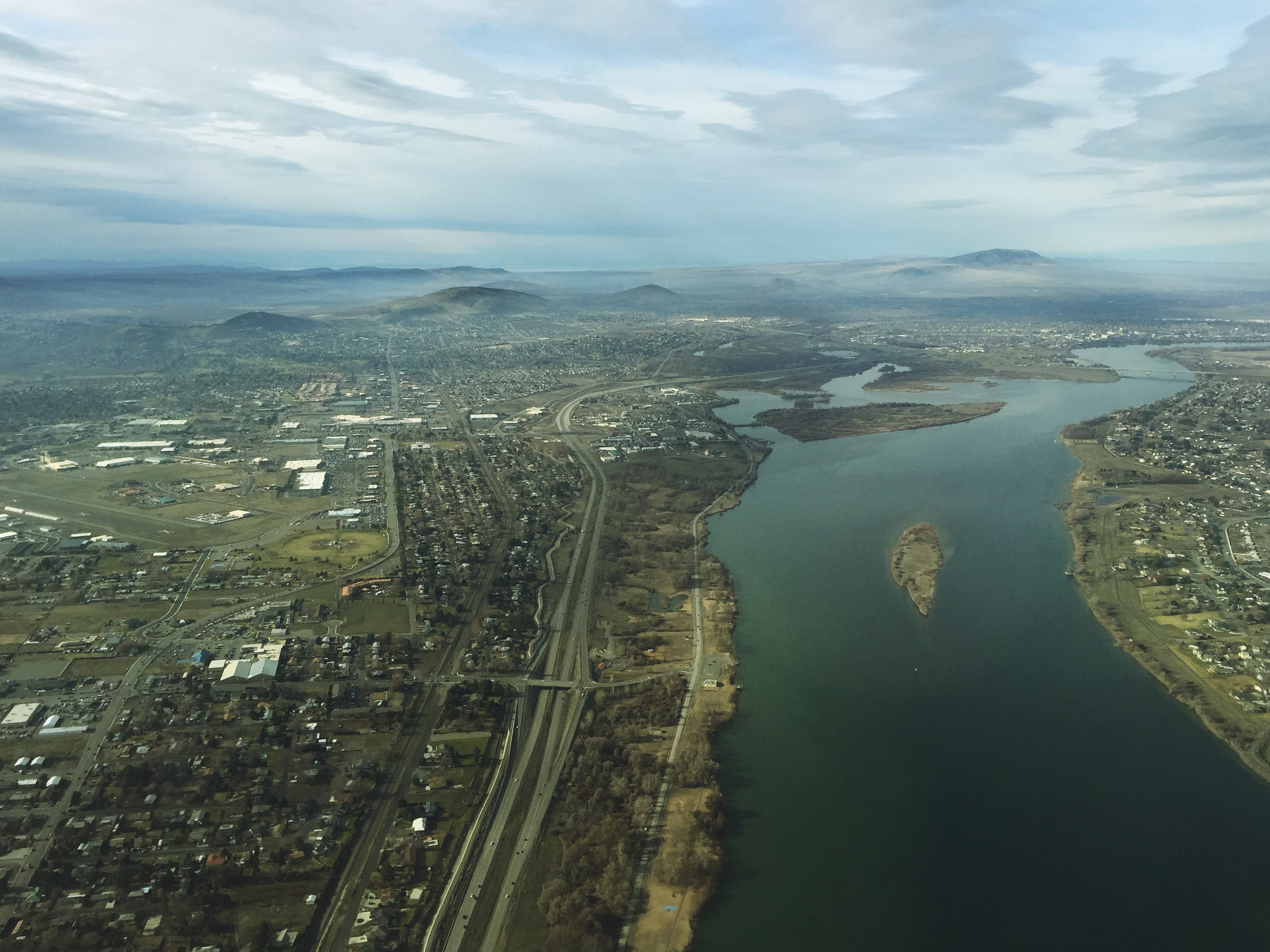
- Aerial view of Kennewick from above the Columbia River
Interactive Map of Kennewick–Richland–
Walla Walla, WA CSA
Kennewick–Richland, WA MSA
City of Kennewick
City of Pasco
City of Richland
Walla Walla, WA MSA
City of Walla Walla
- Coordinates: 46°22′N 119°16′W
- Country: United States
- State: Washington
- Largest city: Kennewick (85,158)
- Other cities: Pasco (81,415); Richland (61,912); West Richland (17,126); Prosser (6,213); Connell (5,080); Benton City (3,559); Mesa (631); Kahlotus (171)

Area
  - Total: 2,942.5 sq mi (7,621 km^{2})
- Highest elevation: 3,527 ft (1,075 m)
- Lowest elevation: 266 ft (81 m)

Population (2025)
  - Total: 324,334
  - Rank: 165th in the U.S.
  - Density: 96/sq mi (37/km^{2})

GDP
  - Total: $21.08 billion (2023)
- Time zone: UTC-8 (PST)
  - Summer (DST): UTC-7 (PDT)

The Kennewick–Pasco–Richland metropolitan area—colloquially referred to as the Tri-Cities metropolitan area, and officially known as the Kennewick–Richland, WA Metropolitan Statistical Area—is a metropolitan area consisting of Benton and Franklin counties in Washington state, anchored by the cities of Kennewick, Pasco, and Richland (the Tri-Cities). As of 2025, the U.S. Census Bureau estimates the population of the metropolitan area to be 324,334, making it the third largest metropolitan area located entirely in Washington, after the Seattle metropolitan area and the Spokane metropolitan area. Although it is located outside of the metropolitan area, the census-designated place (CDP) of Burbank (located in Walla Walla County) is part of the Tri-Cities urban area.

The Tri-Cities metro area is a constituent piece of the Kennewick–Richland–Walla Walla, WA Combined Statistical Area, which consists of the Tri-Cities (Benton and Franklin Counties) along with the Walla Walla metropolitan area (Walla Walla County).

== Counties ==
- Benton
- Franklin

== Communities ==
The following are cities in the Kennewick–Richland, WA MSA categorized based on the United States Census Bureau 2025 population estimates. No population estimates are released for census-designated places (CDPs), which are marked with an asterisk (*). These places are categorized based on their 2020 Census population.

=== Over 50,000 inhabitants ===
- Kennewick (principal city) (88,366)
- Pasco (82,848)
- Richland (principal city) (65,258)

=== 10,000 to 50,000 inhabitants ===
- West Richland (19,257)

=== 5,000 to 9,999 inhabitants ===
- Prosser (6,654)
- Finley* (6,152)
- Connell (5,080)

=== 5,000 inhabitants or fewer ===
- Benton City (4,019)
- West Pasco* (1,747)
- Basin City* (1,063)
- Mesa (391)
- Kahlotus (141)

=== Unincorporated places ===
- Badger
- Eltopia
- Grosscup (now part of West Richland)
- Harder
- Highland
- Kiona
- Longview
- North Prosser
- Paterson
- Plymouth
- Whitstran

=== Ghost towns ===
- Ainsworth
- Berrian
- East White Bluffs
- Gibbon
- Hanford (depopulated in March 1943)
- Horse Heaven
- White Bluffs (depopulated in March 1943)
- Yellepit

== Demographics ==
Historical population
Census	Pop.	Note	%±
1910	13,090		—
1920	16,780		28.2%
1930	17,089		1.8%
1940	18,360		7.4%
1950	64,933		253.7%
1960	85,412		31.5%
1970	93,406		9.4%
1980	144,469		54.7%
1990	150,033		3.9%
2000	191,822		27.9%
2010	253,340		32.1%
2020	303,622		19.8%
2025 (est.)	324,334		6.8%

As of 2023, there were 314,253 people and 109,481 households residing within the MSA. The racial makeup of the MSA was 55% White, 36% Hispanic, 3% Asian, 2% Black, <1% Native, and <1% Islander.

The median income for a household in the MSA was $83,053. The per capita income for the MSA was $38,117.

County	Seat	2025 estimate	2020 census	Change	Land area	Density
Benton	Prosser	221,722	206,873	+7.18%	456 sq mi (1,180 km^{2})	126/sq mi (49/km^{2})
Franklin	Pasco	102,612	96,749	+6.06%	490 sq mi (1,300 km^{2})	81/sq mi (31/km^{2})
Total		324,334	303,622	+6.82%	3,025 sq mi (7,830 km^{2})	107/sq mi (41/km^{2})

== Combined Statistical Area ==
The Kennewick–Richland–Walla Walla, WA Combined Statistical Area is made up of three counties in Eastern Washington. The combined statistical area includes two metropolitan areas. It had a population of 366,206 at the 2020 census, increasing to an estimated 386,695 in 2025. The CSA is the 105th largest in the United States.

Statistical Area	2025 estimate	2020 Census	Change	Land area	Density
Kennewick–Richland, WA Metropolitan Statistical Area	324,334	303,622	+6.82%	3,025 sq mi (7,830 km^{2})	107/sq mi (41/km^{2})
Walla Walla, WA Metropolitan Statistical Area	62,361	62,584	−0.36%	1,299 sq mi (3,360 km^{2})	48/sq mi (19/km^{2})
Total	386,695	366,206	+5.59%	4,324 sq mi (11,200 km^{2})	89/sq mi (35/km^{2})
