= Harder =

Harder may refer to:

== People ==
- Harder (surname)

== Places ==
- Harder, Washington, unincorporated community, United States
- Harder Fjord, Peary Land, Greenland
- Harder (mountain), Switzerland, with a viewpoint at the Harderkulm

== Music ==
- "Harder", a 2002 song by Kosheen
- "Harder", a 2022 song by Chris Brown from Breezy
- "Harder" (Tiësto and Kshmr song), 2016
- "Harder" (Jax Jones and Bebe Rexha song), 2019

== Other uses ==
- Harder (fish), or South African mullet
- USS Harder, two US Navy submarines
- Harder Stadium, University of California, Santa Barbara
