= Washington Highlands =

Washington Highlands or variant may refer to:

- Washington Highlands, Washington, D.C.
- Geography of Washington (state), for the highlands of Washington state, USA
- Geography of Washington, D.C., for the highlands of the District of Columbia, USA
- Highland, Washington, CDP in Washington state
- Washington Township, Highland County, Ohio
- Highland Park, Seattle, Washington
