= John Gibbon =

United States Army officer

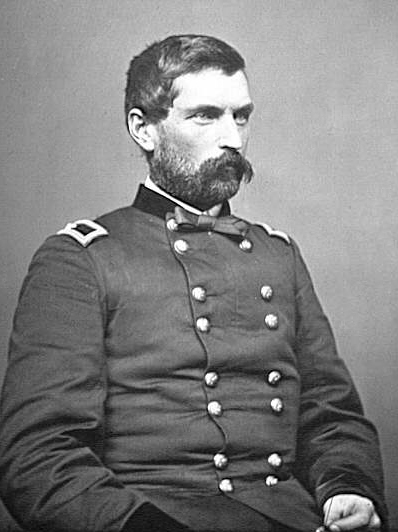
- Born: April 20, 1827; Holmesburg, Philadelphia, Pennsylvania, U.S.
- Died: February 6, 1896 (aged 68); Baltimore, Maryland, U.S.
- Burial place: Arlington National Cemetery
- Relatives: John Heysham Gibbon, (great-nephew)
- Military career
- Allegiance: United States of America; Union
- Branch: United States Army; Union Army
- Service years: 1847 – 1891
- Rank: Major General
- Commands: XXIV Corps, Army of the James; XVIII Corps; Second Division, II Corps; Second Division, I Corps; Iron Brigade
- Conflicts: Mexican–American War; Seminole Wars; American Civil War; Second Battle of Bull Run; Maryland Campaign; Battle of Fredericksburg (WIA); Chancellorsville Campaign; Second Battle of Fredericksburg; Battle of Gettysburg (WIA); Overland Campaign; Siege of Petersburg; Appomattox Campaign; Great Sioux War; Nez Perce War

John Gibbon (April 20, 1827 – February 6, 1896) was a career United States Army officer who fought in the American Civil War and the Indian Wars.

== Early life ==
Gibbon was born in the Holmesburg section of Philadelphia, Pennsylvania, the fourth child of 10 born to Dr. John Heysham Gibbons and Catharine Lardner Gibbons. He was the brother of Lardner Gibbon, publisher of Exploration of the Valley of the Amazon. When Gibbon was nearly 11 years old, the family moved near Charlotte, North Carolina, after his father took a position as chief assayer at the U.S. Mint.

He graduated from the United States Military Academy in 1847 and was commissioned a brevet second lieutenant in the 3rd U.S. Artillery. He served in the Mexican–American War without seeing combat, attempted to keep the peace between Seminoles and settlers in south Florida, and taught artillery tactics at West Point, where he wrote The Artillerist's Manual in 1859.

The manual was a highly scientific treatise on gunnery used by both sides in the Civil War. In 1855, Gibbon married Francis "Fannie" North Moale. They had four children: Frances Moale Gibbon, Catharine "Katy" Lardner Gibbon, John Gibbon Jr, and John S. Gibbon.

== Civil War ==
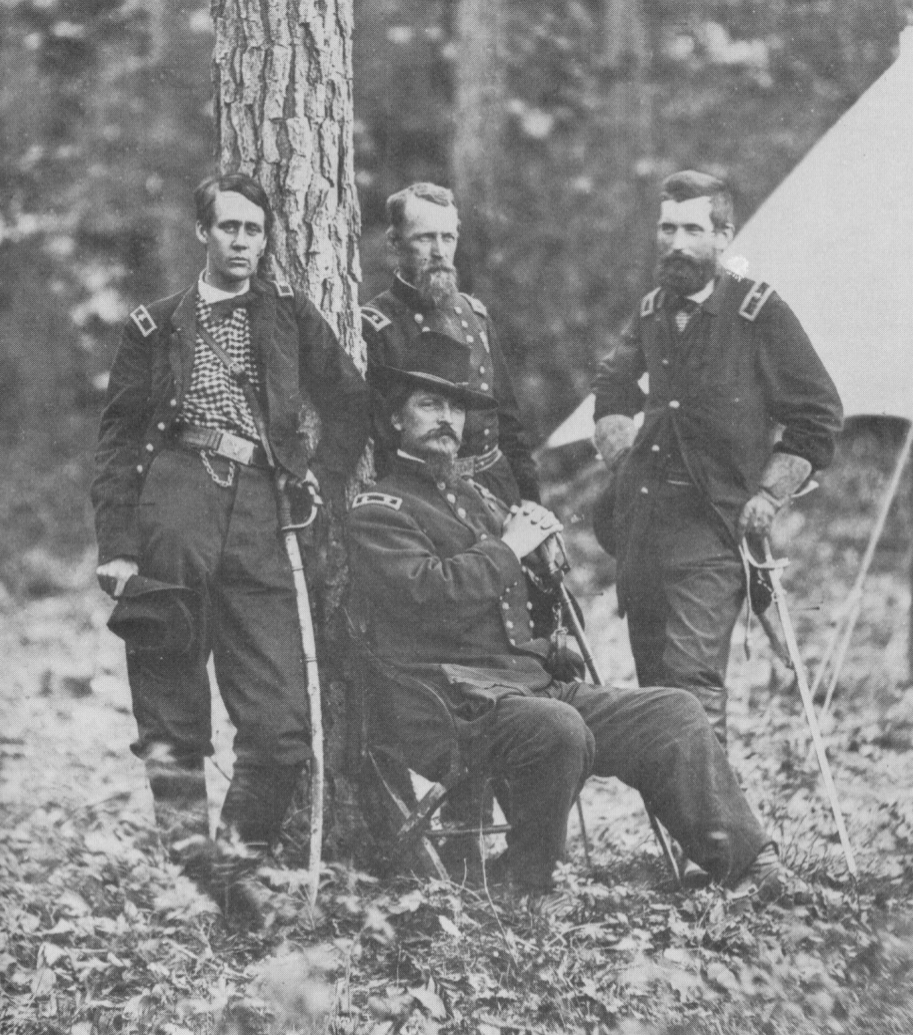
Gibbon (right), with his II corps commander Hancock (sitting) and fellow division commanders Barlow (left) and Birney (center standing) during the Wilderness campaign

When the Civil War began, Gibbon was serving as a captain of Battery B, 4th U.S. Artillery at Camp Floyd in Utah. Although his family owned slaves and several of his family members (three brothers, two brothers-in-law, and his cousin J. Johnston Pettigrew) served in the Confederate military, Gibbon remained loyal to the Union.

Upon arrival in Washington, Gibbon, still in command of the 4th U.S. Artillery, became chief of artillery for Maj. Gen. Irvin McDowell. In 1862, he was appointed brigadier general of volunteers and commanded the brigade of westerners known as King's Wisconsin Brigade. Gibbon quickly set about drilling his troops and improving their appearance, ordering them to wear white leggings and distinctive, black, 1858 regular army, Hardee hats. Their famous hats earned them the nickname "The Black Hat Brigade". Soldiers in his brigade despised the white leggings. While still in camp in Washington D.C., Gibbon awoke one morning to find his horse dressed in the leggings. He led the brigade into action against the famous Confederate Stonewall Brigade at the Battle of Brawner's Farm, a prelude to the Second Battle of Bull Run.

He was in command of the brigade during their strong uphill charge at the Battle of South Mountain, where Maj. Gen. George B. McClellan exclaimed that the men "fought like iron". From then on, the brigade was known as the "Iron Brigade". Gibbon led the brigade at the Battle of Antietam, where he was forced to take time away from brigade command to personally operate an artillery piece in the bloody fighting at the Cornfield.

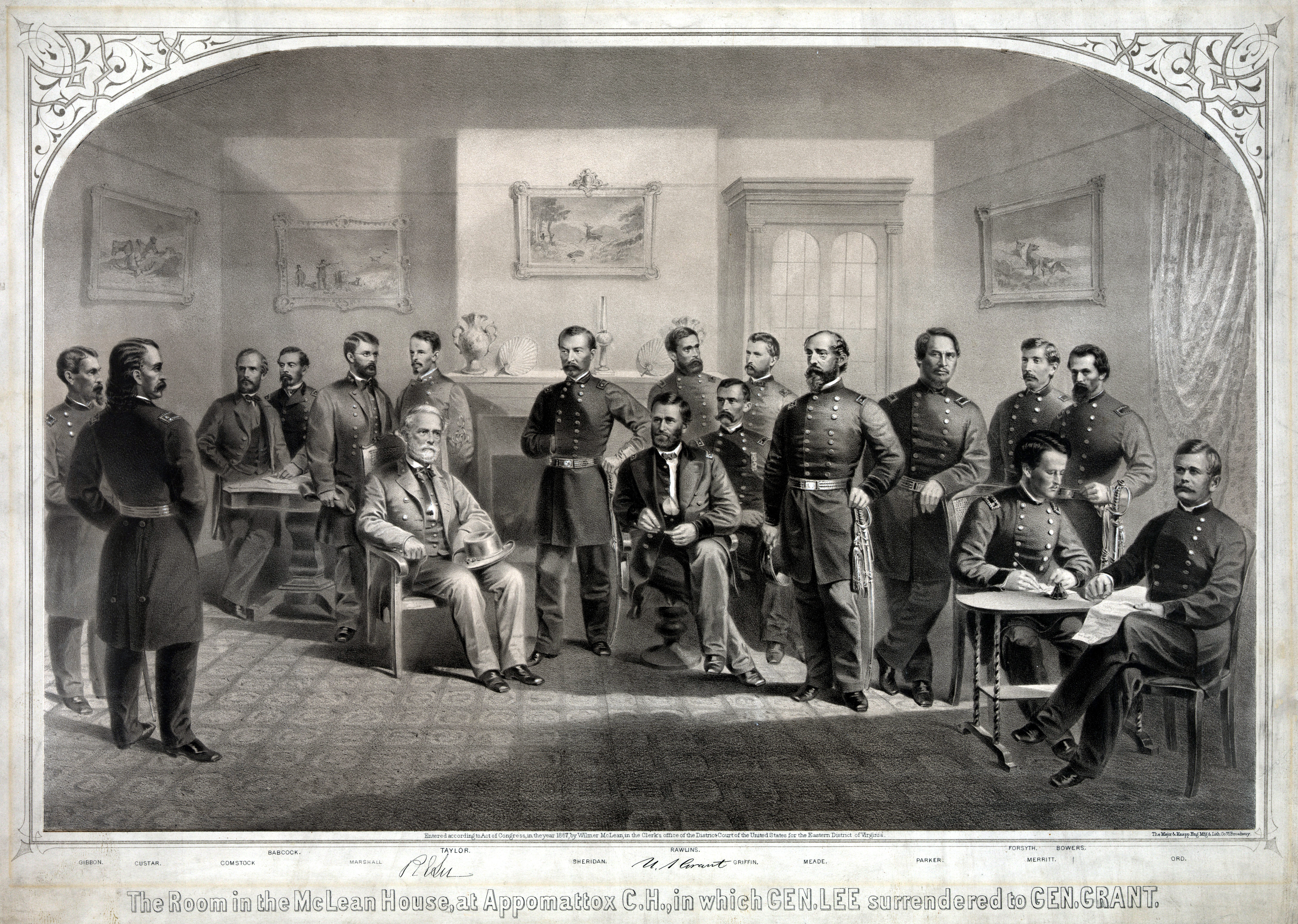
Gibbon (far left) at Lee's surrender at Appomattox (Zoom)

Gibbon was promoted to command the 2nd Division, I Corps at the Battle of Fredericksburg in December 1862, where he was wounded. The wound was minor but was repeatedly infected, so Gibbon was on leave for a few months. Shortly after returning to duty, he learned of the sudden death of his son, John Gibbon Jr.

Gibbon returned for the Battle of Chancellorsville in May 1863, but his division was in reserve and saw little action. At the Battle of Gettysburg in July, he commanded the 2nd Division, II Corps, and temporarily commanded the corps on July 2 and early July 3, 1863, while Maj. Gen. Winfield Scott Hancock was elevated to command larger units.

At the end of the council of war on the night of July 2, army commander Maj. Gen. George Meade took Gibbon aside and predicted, "If Lee attacks tomorrow, it will be on your front." Meade's prediction proved correct; Gibbon's division bore the brunt of Pickett's Charge on July 3, where Gibbon was again wounded. While recovering from his wounds, he commanded a draft depot in Cleveland, Ohio, and attended the dedication of Soldiers' National Cemetery in November 1863 with his close friend and aide Lt. Frank A. Haskell.

Gibbon was back in command of the 2nd Division during Gen. Grant's Overland Campaign in May and June 1864, seeing action at the battles of the Wilderness, Spotsylvania Court House, and Cold Harbor. On June 7, 1864, he was promoted to major general of volunteers. During the subsequent Siege of Petersburg campaign (June 1864 to April 1865), Gibbon became disheartened when his troops refused to fight at Ream's Station in August 1864. He briefly commanded the XVIII Corps before going on sick leave.

His service being too valuable, he returned to command the newly created XXIV Corps in the Army of the James. His troops helped achieve the decisive breakthrough at Third Battle of Petersburg in April 1865, capturing Fort Gregg, part of the Confederate defenses. During the Appomattox Campaign, he helped block the Confederate escape route at the Battle of Appomattox Courthouse, resulting in Gen. Lee's surrender. He was one of three commissioners for the Confederate surrender.

== Indian Wars ==
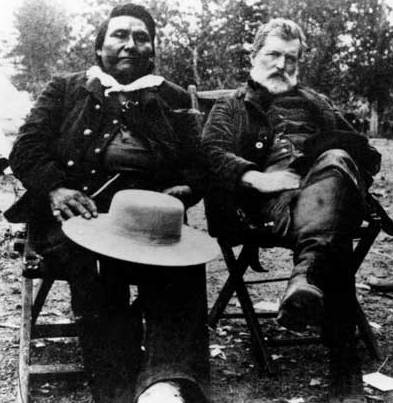
Gibbon and Chief Joseph

Gibbon stayed in the army after the war. He reverted to the regular army rank of colonel. He was in command of the 7th Infantry of the Montana Column consisting of the F, G, H, and L of the 2nd Cavalry under James S. Brisbin from Fort Ellis and his regiment of 7th Infantry stationed at Shaw, Baker, and Ellis in the Montana Territory, during the campaign against the Sioux in 1876. Gibbon, General George Crook, and General Alfred Terry were to make a coordinated campaign against the Sioux and Cheyenne, but Crook was driven back at the Battle of the Rosebud.

Gibbon was not close by when Lt. Col. George Armstrong Custer attacked a very large village on the banks of the Little Bighorn River. The Battle of the Little Bighorn resulted in the deaths of Custer and some 261 of his men. Gibbon's approach on June 26 probably saved the lives of the several hundred men under the command of Major Marcus Reno, who were still under siege. Gibbon arrived the next day and helped to bury the dead and evacuate the wounded.

Gibbon was still in command in Montana the following year when he received a telegraph from General Oliver Otis Howard to cut off the Nez Percé who had left Idaho, pursued by Howard. (See Nez Perce War) In western Montana, Gibbon found the Nez Perce near the Big Hole River. At the Battle of the Big Hole, Gibbon's forces inflicted and suffered heavy casualties, including several dozen Nez Perce civilians, and Gibbon became pinned down by Indian sniper fire. The Nez Perce withdrew in good order after the second day of the battle. In response to Gibbon's urgent call for help, General Howard and an advance party arrived the next day at the battlefield. Because of his casualties and a wound he suffered, Gibbon was unable to continue his pursuit of the Nez Perce.

Gibbon was a Life Member of the Military Service Institution of the United States and won the institution's first gold medal prize for his essay on "Our Indian question", which is published in Volume 2 of the Journal of the Military Service Institution of the United States.

== Later career and retirement ==
Gibbon served temporarily as commander of the Department of the Platte in 1884. He was promoted to brigadier general in the regular army in 1885 and took command of the Department of the Columbia, representing all posts in the Pacific Northwest. He placed Seattle, Washington, under martial law during the anti-Chinese riots of 1886. From 1890, Gibbon was also head of the Military Division of the Atlantic. Gibbon retired in 1891 upon turning 64.

Gibbon served as president of the Iron Brigade Association and Commander in Chief of the Military Order of the Loyal Legion of the United States from October 1895 until his death the following year. He also gave the commencement address to the West Point Class of 1886.

It is said the Gibbon was traveling through Wisconsin, heard of an Iron Brigade reunion, and decided to stop by. Upon knocking on the door of the reunion venue, Gibbon was asked by a veteran who he was. Gibbon is said to have replied, "General Gibbon, and I'm still looking for the bastards who dressed my horse in white leggings!" At this, Gibbon was welcomed inside to take part in the reunion.

== Death and legacy ==
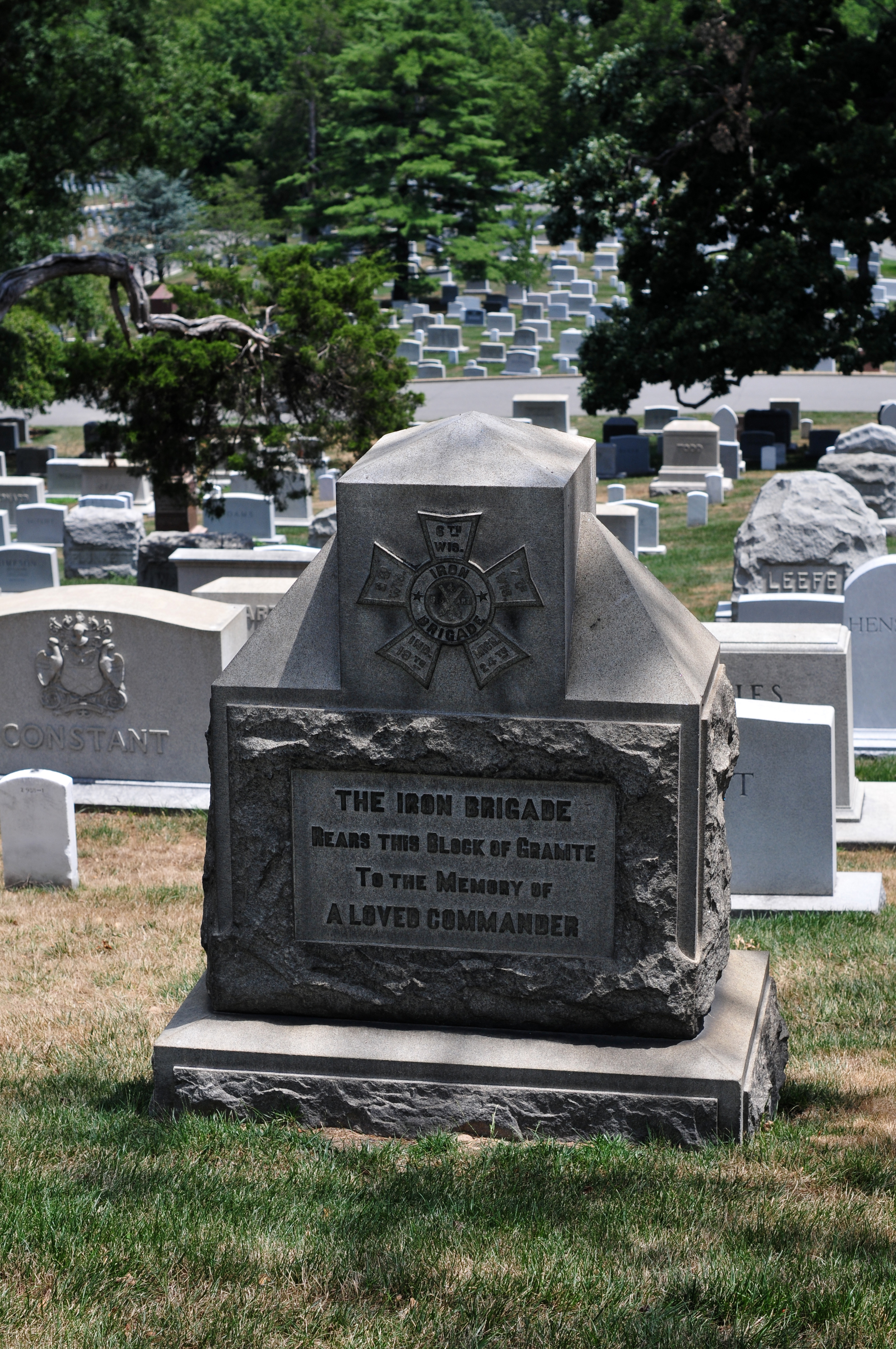
John Gibbon's grave at Arlington National Cemetery

Gibbon died in Baltimore, Maryland, and is buried in Arlington National Cemetery. In addition to his famous and influential Artillerist's Manual of 1859, he is the author of Personal Recollections of the Civil War, published posthumously in 1928, and Adventures on the Western Frontier, also posthumous, 1994, along with many articles in magazines and journals, typically recounting his time in the West and providing his opinions on the government's policy toward Native Americans.

On July 3, 1988, the 125th anniversary of the Battle of Gettysburg, a bronze statue of Gibbon was dedicated in the Gettysburg National Military Park, near the site of his wounding in Pickett's Charge.

The town of Gibbon in south central Minnesota is named after him, as are Gibbonsville, Idaho; Gibbon, Oregon; Gibbon, Nebraska; and Gibbon, Washington. The Gibbon River and Falls in Yellowstone National Park also bear his name after his 1872 expedition there.

== In popular media ==
- Gibbon was portrayed in the film Gettysburg by Emile O. Schmidt.
- Gibbon was a character in the alternate history novel Gettysburg: A Novel of the Civil War (2003) by Newt Gingrich and William Forstchen.
