= Grosscup, Washington =

Former city in Washington

Grosscup
- Former township
- Interactive map of Grosscup
- Coordinates: 46°19′23″N 119°22′25″W
- country: United States
- State: Washington
- County: Benton
- Founded: 1903
- integrated: 1955
- Named for: Benton S. Grosscup
- Elevation: 404 ft (123 m)

Population
  - Rural: around 600 people
- Time zone: UTC-8 (Pacific (PST))
  - Summer (DST): UTC-7 (PDT)
- ZIP code: 99353
- Area code: 509

Grosscup, Washington was a small farming settlement located in what is now the city of West Richland, Washington. Named after Judge Benton S. Grosscup, a former vice-president of the Northern Pacific Railroad.

== History ==
The settlement was founded and developed during the late 19th and early 20th centuries, because of the fertile land and favorable climate for agriculture in the region. The small community primarily relying on agriculture.

The gradual integration of Grosscup into West Richland occurred during the years of 1954 and 1955, as the town of Enterprise, Washington, joined West Richland with a vote of 218 to 80 in March 1954. Then on June, 7th 1955 Another vote was put in place to annex the rest of Heminger's acres which included Grosscup. In August 1955, the town limits were extended, which completed the annexation of Heminger's acres along with Grosscup and any other town in the area.
