= Farrington, Washington =

Unincorporated community in Washington, US

- Unincorporated community
- Location within Washington (state) Location within the United States
- Coordinates: 46°32′23″N 118°34′43″W
- Country: United States
- State: Washington
- County: Franklin
- Elevation: 748 ft (228 m)
- Time zone: UTC-8 (Pacific (PST))
  - Summer (DST): UTC-7 (PDT)
- GNIS feature ID: 1510963

Farrington is an unincorporated community in Franklin County, in the U.S. state of Washington.

== History ==
The community was named after R. I. Farrington, a railroad official. Farrington was a railway stop along the Snake River approximately 37 miles Northeast of Pasco, Washington.

From April 6, 1917, coinciding with the declaration of war on the German Empire, until October 16, 1917 a detachment of Company F 2nd Idaho Infantry garrisoned Farrington to guard railroad and waterway infrastructure from sabotage concerns. On September 19, 1917, the unit was redesignated Company F, 116th Engineer Regiment, 41st Division.
