= Juniper Dunes Wilderness =

Wilderness area in Washington, United States

- IUCN category Ib (wilderness area)
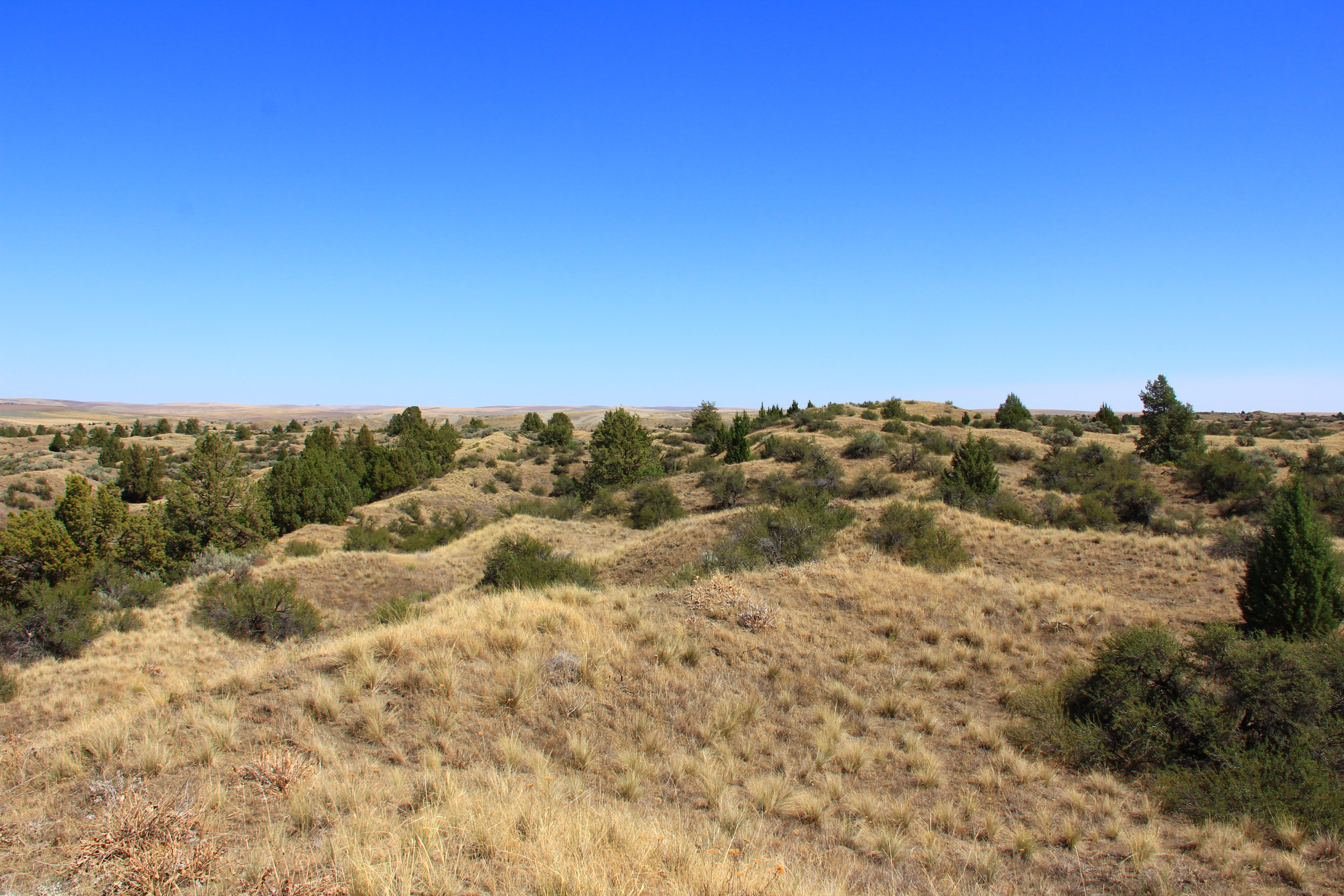
- Juniper Dunes
- Interactive map of Juniper Dunes Wilderness
- Location: Franklin County, Washington, United States
- Nearest city: Pasco, WA
- Coordinates: 46°23′30″N 118°51′20″W
- Area: 7,140 acres (2,890 ha)
- Established: 1984
- Governing body: United States Department of Interior Bureau of Land Management

The Juniper Dunes Wilderness is a protected wilderness area comprising 7,140 acres (28.9 km²) in Franklin County, Washington. Established in 1984, it is noteworthy for the northernmost growth of western juniper trees that live among the area's large sand dunes.

== Flora and fauna ==
Common wildlife found in Juniper Dunes Wilderness include mule deer, bobcat, coyote, badger, skunk, weasel, porcupine, pocket gopher, kangaroo rat, several species of mouse, hawk, owl, raven, quail, partridge, pheasant, dove, numerous songbirds, and rattlesnakes.

Other than the namesake junipers, no trees grow in significant numbers here. Other vegetation found in the Wilderness include rubber rabbitbrush, green rabbitbrush, bluebunch wheatgrass, Indian ricegrass, white sand-verbena, Franklin sandwort, sicklepod milkvetch, turpentine cymopterus, hymenopappus, prickly pear cactus, sand-dune penstemon, lanceleaf breadroot, sand dock, Carey balsamroot, wild-hyacinth, larkspur, wild flax, snow buckwheat, desert parsley Indian-potato, and silverleaf phacelia.

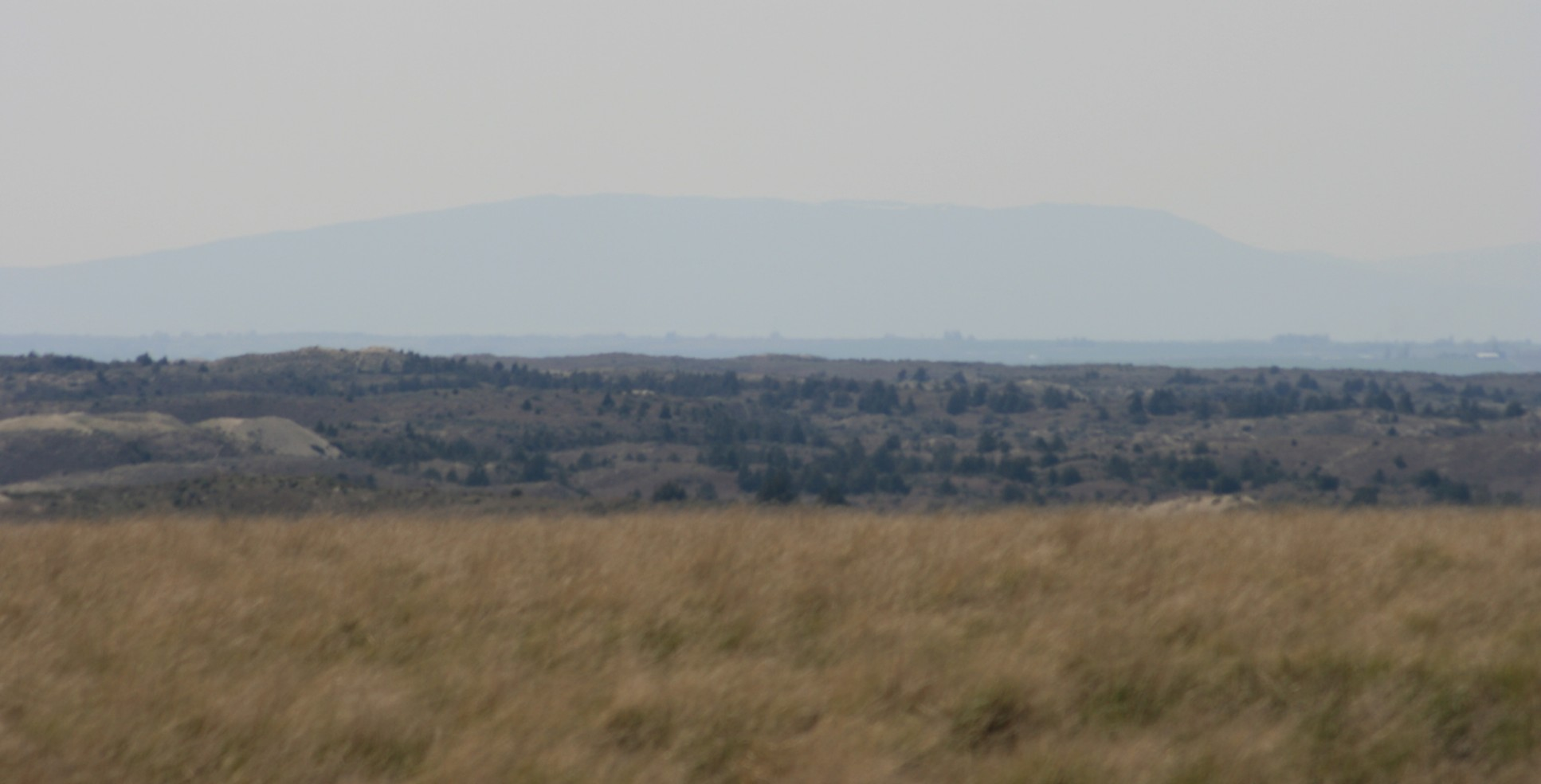
Juniper Dunes as viewed from the east with grasslands in the foreground and Rattlesnake Mountain in the hazy distance behind.

== Access ==
As the wilderness area is surrounded by privately owned land an agreement was reached in early 2007 with landowners that allows visitors, with permission, to travel on one of several old jeep trails that end near the Wilderness boundary.
