= West Pasco, Washington =

- Census-designated place
- Location of West Pasco, Washington
- Coordinates: 46°15′9″N 119°10′58″W
- Country: United States
- State: Washington
- County: Franklin

Area
  - Total: 3.7 sq mi (9.7 km^{2})
  - Land: 3.7 sq mi (9.7 km^{2})
  - Water: 0 sq mi (0.0 km^{2})
- Elevation: 360 ft (110 m)

Population (2020)
  - Total: 1,747
  - Density: 470/sq mi (180/km^{2})
- Time zone: UTC-8 (Pacific (PST))
  - Summer (DST): UTC-7 (PDT)
- ZIP code: 99301
- Area code: 509
- FIPS code: 53-77612
- GNIS feature ID: 1867645

West Pasco is a census-designated place (CDP) in Franklin County, Washington, United States. The population was 1,747 at the 2020 census, a significant decrease from 3,739 at the 2010 census.

Based on per capita income, one of the more reliable measures of affluence, West Pasco ranks 47th of 522 areas in the state of Washington to be ranked. It is also the highest rank achieved in Franklin County. The city of Pasco, Washington, as of 2012, was attempting to annex all of West Pasco, although there was some resistance.

== Geography ==
West Pasco is located in southern Franklin County at 46°15′9″N 119°10′58″W (46.252607, -119.182730). It is entirely surrounded by the city of Pasco.

According to the United States Census Bureau, the CDP in 2010 had a total area of 3.7 square miles (9.7 km^{2}), all of it land, a reduction from 2000, when the total area was 7.2 square miles (18.7 km^{2}).

== Demographics ==
Historical population
Census	Pop.	Note	%±
1960	2,894		—
1970	3,809		31.6%
1980	6,210		63.0%
1990	7,312		17.7%
2000	4,629		−36.7%
2010	3,739		−19.2%
2020	1,747		−53.3%
U.S. Decennial Census; 1960 1970 1980 1990; 2000 2010

=== 2020 census ===
As of the 2020 census, West Pasco had a population of 1,747. The median age was 39.1 years. 28.1% of residents were under the age of 18 and 17.3% of residents were 65 years of age or older. For every 100 females there were 110.7 males, and for every 100 females age 18 and over there were 109.0 males age 18 and over.

100.0% of residents lived in urban areas, while 0.0% lived in rural areas.

There were 552 households in West Pasco, of which 41.7% had children under the age of 18 living in them. Of all households, 70.8% were married-couple households, 12.1% were households with a male householder and no spouse or partner present, and 11.1% were households with a female householder and no spouse or partner present. About 10.1% of all households were made up of individuals and 5.2% had someone living alone who was 65 years of age or older.

There were 570 housing units, of which 3.2% were vacant. The homeowner vacancy rate was 0.2% and the rental vacancy rate was 1.6%.

Racial composition as of the 2020 census
Race	Number	Percent
White	1,295	74.1%
Black or African American	8	0.5%
American Indian and Alaska Native	19	1.1%
Asian	14	0.8%
Native Hawaiian and Other Pacific Islander	3	0.2%
Some other race	203	11.6%
Two or more races	205	11.7%
Hispanic or Latino (of any race)	497	28.4%

=== 2000 census ===
As of the census of 2000, there were 4,629 people, 1,618 households, and 1,380 families residing in the CDP. The population density was 767.8 people per square mile (296.4/km^{2}). There were 1,661 housing units at an average density of 275.5/sq mi (106.4/km^{2}). The racial makeup of the CDP was 89.59% White, 1.10% African American, 0.73% Native American, 1.17% Asian, 0.04% Pacific Islander, 4.47% from other races, and 2.89% from two or more races. Hispanic or Latino of any race were 10.02% of the population.

There were 1,618 households, out of which 35.8% had children under the age of 18 living with them, 76.8% were married couples living together, 4.9% had a female householder with no husband present, and 14.7% were non-families. 12.2% of all households were made up of individuals, and 5.3% had someone living alone who was 65 years of age or older. The average household size was 2.85 and the average family size was 3.08.

In the CDP, the age distribution of the population shows 26.6% under the age of 18, 6.0% from 18 to 24, 24.2% from 25 to 44, 31.1% from 45 to 64, and 12.1% who were 65 years of age or older. The median age was 42 years. For every 100 females, there were 99.5 males. For every 100 females age 18 and over, there were 99.5 males.

The median income for a household in the CDP was $65,865, and the median income for a family was $68,205. Males had a median income of $50,504 versus $31,947 for females. The per capita income for the CDP was $28,523. About 2.2% of families and 2.8% of the population were below the poverty line, including 4.0% of those under age 18 and 2.1% of those age 65 or over.

== History ==
The area now known as West Pasco was originally inhabited by Native American tribes, including the Yakama, Walla Walla, and Umatilla peoples. These tribes relied on the Columbia River for fishing, trade, and transportation, developing complex societies with cultural and traditions centered around the river. European exploration in the region began in the early 19th century, with the Lewis and Clark Expedition passing through in 1805. This marked the beginning of increased interaction between Native American tribes and European settlers. By the mid-19th century, the establishment of Fort Walla Walla and subsequent agricultural development led to more permanent settlements in the area.

The modern development of West Pasco accelerated during the mid-20th century, primarily due to the establishment of the Hanford Site as part of the Manhattan Project during World War II. The Hanford Site's role in producing plutonium for nuclear weapons brought a substantial population increase to the Tri-Cities area, including Pasco. To accommodate the growing workforce, residential subdivisions were constructed, and West Pasco began to expand significantly.

In the post-war era, infrastructure development such as roads, schools, and public facilities supported the expanding population. The region's agricultural roots remained strong, with local farms producing a variety of crops, including wheat, potatoes, and later, wine grapes. The Columbia Basin's favorable climate and fertile soil proved ideal for viticulture, and the area has since become one of the premier wine-producing regions in the United States.
