= Franklin County, Washington =

County in Washington, United States

- County
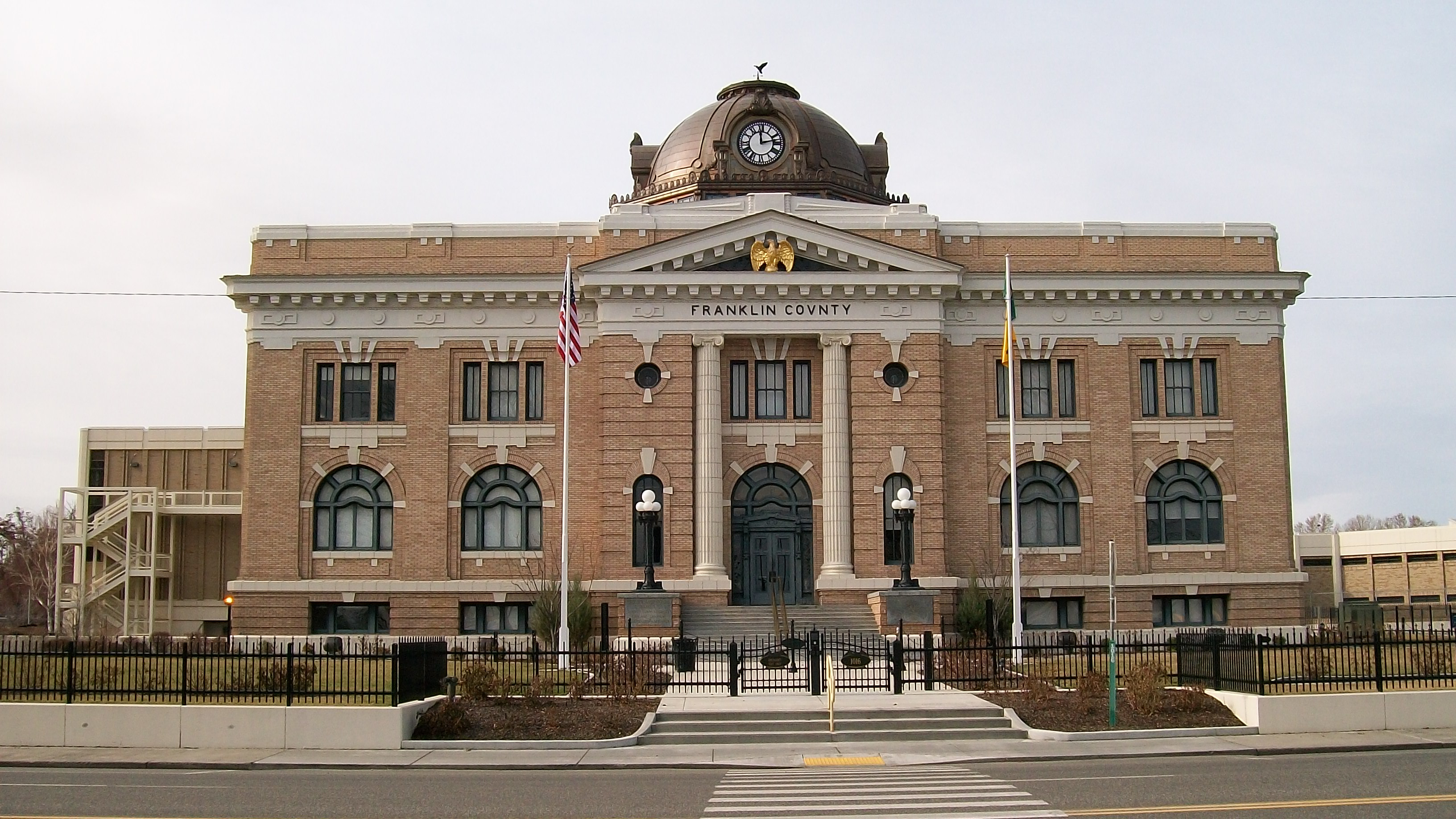
- The Franklin County Courthouse in Pasco

- Location within the U.S. state of Washington
- Coordinates: 46.537502°N 118.903891°W
- Country: United States
- State: Washington
- Founded: November 28, 1883
- Named for: Benjamin Franklin
- Seat: Pasco
- Largest city: Pasco

Government
  - Sheriff: Marcus Conner

Area
  - Total: 1,264.959 sq mi (3,276.23 km^{2})
  - Land: 1,241.596 sq mi (3,215.72 km^{2})
  - Water: 23.363 sq mi (60.51 km^{2}) 1.85%

Population (2020)
  - Total: 96,749
  - Estimate (2025): 102,612 ▲
  - Density: 77.923/sq mi (30.086/km^{2})
- Time zone: UTC−8 (Pacific)
  - Summer (DST): UTC−7 (PDT)
- Area code: 509
- Congressional districts: 4th, 5th
- Website: franklincountywa.gov

Franklin County is a county located in the U.S. state of Washington. As of the 2020 census, its population was 96,749, and was estimated to be 102,612 in 2025. The county seat and largest city is Pasco.

The county was formed out of Whitman County on November 28, 1883, and is named for Benjamin Franklin.

Franklin County is included in the Tri-Cities metropolitan area. Together, Kennewick, Richland and Pasco comprise Washington's Tri-Cities.

== Geography ==
According to the United States Census Bureau, the county has a total area of 1,264.959 square miles (3,276.23 km^{2}), of which 1,241.596 square miles (3,215.72 km^{2}) is land and 23.363 square miles (60.51 km^{2}) (1.85%) is water. It is the 27th largest county in Washington by total area.

=== Geographic features ===
- Columbia River
- Hanford Nuclear Reservation
- Juniper Dunes Wilderness
- Snake River

=== Major highways ===
- SR 260
- Interstate 182
- U.S. 12
- U.S. 395

=== Adjacent counties ===
- Adams County - north
- Whitman County - east
- Walla Walla County - southeast
- Columbia County - southeast
- Benton County - southwest
- Grant County - northwest

=== National protected areas ===
- Hanford Reach National Monument (part)
- Saddle Mountain National Wildlife Refuge (part)

== Demographics ==
Historical population
Census	Pop.	Note	%±
1890	696		—
1900	486		−30.2%
1910	5,153		960.3%
1920	5,877		14.1%
1930	6,137		4.4%
1940	6,307		2.8%
1950	13,563		115.0%
1960	23,342		72.1%
1970	25,816		10.6%
1980	35,025		35.7%
1990	37,473		7.0%
2000	49,347		31.7%
2010	78,163		58.4%
2020	96,749		23.8%
2025 (est.)	102,612	▲	6.1%
U.S. Decennial Census; 1790–1960 1900–1990; 1990–2000 2010–2020

=== 2024–2025 estimates ===
As of the second quarter of 2025, the median home value in Franklin County was $416,327.

As of the 2024 American Community Survey, there are 31,564 estimated households in Franklin County with an average of 3.09 persons per household. The county has a median household income of $81,604. Approximately 17.8% of the county's population lives at or below the poverty line. Franklin County has an estimated 58.1% employment rate, with 21.3% of the population holding a bachelor's degree or higher and 80.0% holding a high school diploma. There were 32,687 housing units at an average density of 26.33 per square mile (10.2/km^{2}).

The median age in the county was 32.5 years.

=== 2020 census ===
Franklin County, Washington – racial and ethnic composition Note: the US Census treats Hispanic/Latino as an ethnic category. This table excludes Latinos from the racial categories and assigns them to a separate category. Hispanics/Latinos may be of any race.
Race / ethnicity (NH = non-Hispanic)	Pop. 1980	Pop. 1990	Pop. 2000	Pop. 2010	Pop. 2020
White alone (NH)	27,502 (78.52%)	23,784 (63.47%)	23,470 (47.56%)	33,804 (43.25%)	37,225 (38.48%)
Black or African American alone (NH)	1,441 (4.11%)	1,251 (3.34%)	1,120 (2.27%)	1,339 (1.71%)	1,603 (1.66%)
Native American or Alaska Native alone (NH)	234 (0.67%)	217 (0.58%)	235 (0.48%)	357 (0.46%)	437 (0.45%)
Asian alone (NH)	330 (0.94%)	805 (2.15%)	767 (1.55%)	1,384 (1.77%)	1,796 (1.86%)
Pacific Islander alone (NH)	—	—	32 (0.06%)	92 (0.12%)	195 (0.20%)
Other race alone (NH)	106 (0.30%)	100 (0.27%)	39 (0.08%)	96 (0.12%)	338 (0.35%)
Mixed race or multiracial (NH)	—	—	652 (1.32%)	1,087 (1.39%)	2,710 (2.80%)
Hispanic or Latino (any race)	5,412 (15.45%)	11,316 (30.20%)	23,032 (46.67%)	40,004 (51.18%)	52,445 (54.21%)
Total	35,025 (100.00%)	37,473 (100.00%)	49,347 (100.00%)	78,163 (100.00%)	96,749 (100.00%)

As of the 2020 census, the county had a population of 96,749. Of the residents, 31.5% were under the age of 18 and 9.9% were 65 years of age or older; the median age was 30.9 years. For every 100 females there were 106.9 males, and for every 100 females age 18 and over there were 109.0 males. 88.6% of residents lived in urban areas and 11.4% lived in rural areas.

The population density was 77.92 inhabitants per square mile (30.1/km^{2}) and there were 29,740 housing units at an average density of 23.95 per square mile (9.2/km^{2}). Of those units, 3.3% were vacant; among occupied housing units, 68.3% were owner-occupied and 31.7% were renter-occupied. The homeowner vacancy rate was 0.5% and the rental vacancy rate was 3.6%.

The racial makeup of the county was 47.4% White, 1.9% Black or African American, 1.5% American Indian and Alaska Native, 2.0% Asian, 30.4% from some other race, and 16.7% from two or more races. Hispanic or Latino residents of any race comprised 54.2% of the population.

There were 28,748 households in the county, of which 47.5% had children under the age of 18 living with them and 20.7% had a female householder with no spouse or partner present. About 16.5% of all households were made up of individuals and 6.4% had someone living alone who was 65 years of age or older.

=== 2010 census ===
As of the 2010 census, there were 78,163 people, 23,245 households, and 18,163 families residing in the county. The population density was 62.95 inhabitants per square mile (24.3/km^{2}). There were 24,423 housing units at an average density of 19.67 per square mile (7.6/km^{2}). The racial makeup of the county was 60.48% White, 1.88% African American, 0.68% Native American, 1.83% Asian, 0.14% Pacific Islander, 31.83% from some other races and 3.16% from two or more races. Hispanic or Latino people of any race were 51.18% of the population.

In terms of ancestry, 13.1% were German, 6.8% were English, 6.5% were Irish, and 3.3% were American.

There were 23,245 households, 49.9% had children under the age of 18 living with them, 57.9% were married couples living together, 13.4% had a female householder with no husband present, 21.9% were non-families, and 16.4% of all households were made up of individuals. The average household size was 3.28 and the average family size was 3.68. The median age was 28.4 years.

The median income for a household in the county was $47,749 and the median income for a family was $52,218. Males had a median income of $40,604 versus $29,517 for females. The per capita income for the county was $18,660. About 16.5% of families and 19.9% of the population were below the poverty line, including 25.6% of those under age 18 and 13.7% of those age 65 or over.

== Communities ==
=== Cities ===
- Connell
- Kahlotus
- Mesa
- Pasco (county seat)

=== Census-designated places ===
- Basin City
- West Pasco

=== Unincorporated communities ===
- Eltopia
- Farrington
- Harder

=== Former communities ===
- Sperry

== Government ==
Franklin County has a Board of County Commissioners which is the governmental authority of the county. The board consists of three commissioners; they are elected by the voters and serve four-year terms. Other elected county officials include Assessor, Auditor, Clerk, Coroner, Prosecuting Attorney, Sheriff, and Treasurer.

== Politics ==
United States presidential election results for Franklin County, Washington
Year	Republican		Democratic		Third party(ies)	
Year	No.	%	No.	%	No.	%
1892	28	23.53%	54	45.38%	37	31.09%
1896	38	24.84%	113	73.86%	2	1.31%
1900	52	37.41%	81	58.27%	6	4.32%
1904	572	69.25%	223	27.00%	31	3.75%
1908	643	52.97%	485	39.95%	86	7.08%
1912	293	16.41%	612	34.29%	880	49.30%
1916	671	35.02%	1,110	57.93%	135	7.05%
1920	839	44.46%	571	30.26%	477	25.28%
1924	709	31.15%	237	10.41%	1,330	58.44%
1928	1,339	61.96%	799	36.97%	23	1.06%
1932	838	33.89%	1,540	62.27%	95	3.84%
1936	622	23.98%	1,784	68.77%	188	7.25%
1940	1,084	36.34%	1,868	62.62%	31	1.04%
1944	1,381	40.97%	1,974	58.56%	16	0.47%
1948	1,541	37.31%	2,525	61.14%	64	1.55%
1952	3,291	53.89%	2,798	45.82%	18	0.29%
1956	3,763	46.51%	4,322	53.42%	5	0.06%
1960	4,201	44.65%	5,156	54.80%	52	0.55%
1964	3,615	35.94%	6,375	63.38%	68	0.68%
1968	4,234	44.22%	4,038	42.17%	1,303	13.61%
1972	5,972	56.75%	3,867	36.75%	684	6.50%
1976	5,671	54.51%	4,369	42.00%	363	3.49%
1980	7,327	61.26%	3,719	31.09%	915	7.65%
1984	7,724	62.96%	4,328	35.28%	216	1.76%
1988	6,488	56.65%	4,772	41.67%	192	1.68%
1992	4,486	41.02%	3,743	34.22%	2,708	24.76%
1996	5,946	49.16%	4,961	41.01%	1,189	9.83%
2000	8,594	63.13%	4,653	34.18%	367	2.70%
2004	10,757	66.57%	5,188	32.11%	214	1.32%
2008	12,037	61.11%	7,361	37.37%	298	1.51%
2012	13,748	60.72%	8,398	37.09%	497	2.19%
2016	13,206	53.65%	8,886	36.10%	2,522	10.25%
2020	18,039	55.67%	13,340	41.17%	1,025	3.16%
2024	19,086	59.84%	11,884	37.26%	927	2.91%

Franklin is a reliably Republican county in Presidential elections. No Democratic presidential candidate has carried Franklin County since Lyndon B. Johnson’s 1964 landslide, and the last Democratic gubernatorial candidate it backed was Dixy Lee Ray in 1976.

== See also ==
- National Register of Historic Places listings in Franklin County, Washington
