= Yellepit, Washington =

Unincorporated community in Washington, United States

- Former unincorporated community
- Location within Benton County, Washington
- Coordinates: 46°03′39″N 118°57′05″W
- Country: United States
- State: Washington
- County: Benton
- Elevation: 341 ft (104 m)
- Time zone: UTC-8 (Pacific (PST))
  - Summer (DST): UTC-7 (PDT)
- ZIP code: 99337
- Area code: 509
- GNIS feature ID: 1511443

Yellepit was an unincorporated community in Benton County, Washington, United States, located approximately three miles southwest of Wallula on the west bank of the Columbia River.

== History ==
The community was named Yellepit in honor of a chief of the Walla Walla tribe who was encountered by the Lewis and Clark Expedition. The community once had a large train depot, water tank and other buildings. In 1953 the community site was inundated by the waters of Lake Wallula.
