= East White Bluffs, Washington =

Unincorporated community in Washington, United States

- Unincorporated community
- Rabbit Hunt, East White Bluffs, Washington, 1914

- Location within Benton County, Washington
- Coordinates: 46°40′24″N 119°27′40″W
- Country: United States
- State: Washington
- County: Benton
- Elevation: 390 ft (120 m)
- Time zone: UTC-8 (Pacific (PST))
  - Summer (DST): UTC-7 (PDT)
- ZIP code: 98944
- Area code: 509
- GNIS feature ID: 1510931

East White Bluffs was an unincorporated community in Benton County, Washington, United States, located approximately 17 miles southwest of Othello on the Hanford Nuclear Reservation.
