= Longview, Benton County, Washington =

Unincorporated community in Washington, United States

Longview, Washington
- Unincorporated community
- Location within Benton County, Washington
- Coordinates: 45°55′44″N 119°24′48″W
- Country: United States
- State: Washington
- County: Cowlitz
- Elevation: 302 ft (92 m)
- Time zone: UTC-8 (Pacific (PST))
  - Summer (DST): UTC-7 (PDT)
- ZIP code: 99346
- Area code: 509
- GNIS feature ID: 1514780

Longview is an unincorporated historic community in Benton County, Washington, United States, located approximately three miles west of Umatilla, Oregon on the north bank of the Columbia River, just above Devil's Bend Rapids.

== History ==
This community was known as King, for David and America King who homesteaded here, from 1904 until the Spokane, Portland and Seattle Railway established a construction camp in 1906 called Gravel because of the abundance of gravel found in the area. At the completion of the railroad construction, the SP&S established a station that went through several name changes; first Francis in 1908, then Tuton in 1909, and Longview in 1911. Francis was rejected because Washington already had a Frances, Tuton was often confused with the nearby town of Luzon, and so the name became Longview, because of the "long" view of the Columbia River from the community's location.

In October 1922, the developers of Longview in Cowlitz County, Washington petitioned the residences of Longview, Benton County to change the station name, freeing the name for their development in Cowlitz County. In exchange for a covered platform on which to drop the mail in a protected location, the residents agreed and the railroad chose the name Barger. Finally, on November 23, 1943, the station was renamed the original King until it closed in 1951.
