= Badger, Washington =

Unincorporated community in Washington, United States

- Unincorporated community
- Location within Benton County, Washington
- Coordinates: 46°12′0.5″N 119°21′34″W
- Country: United States
- State: Washington
- County: Benton
- Elevation: 682 ft (208 m)
- Time zone: UTC-8 (Pacific (PST))
  - Summer (DST): UTC-7 (PDT)
- ZIP code: 99320
- Area code: 509
- GNIS feature ID: 1510800

Badger is an unincorporated community in Benton County, Washington, United States, located approximately three miles southwest of Richland, near Badger Springs and Badger Canyon.

== History ==
The community was established in 1883 and named by the Northern Pacific Railway Company because of spring water that was found flowing out of a badger hole. The community had a school in 1907, as well as a post office and a store a few years later.
