= Whitstran, Washington =

Unincorporated community in Washington, United States

Whitstran, Washington Whitstran Spur
- Unincorporated community
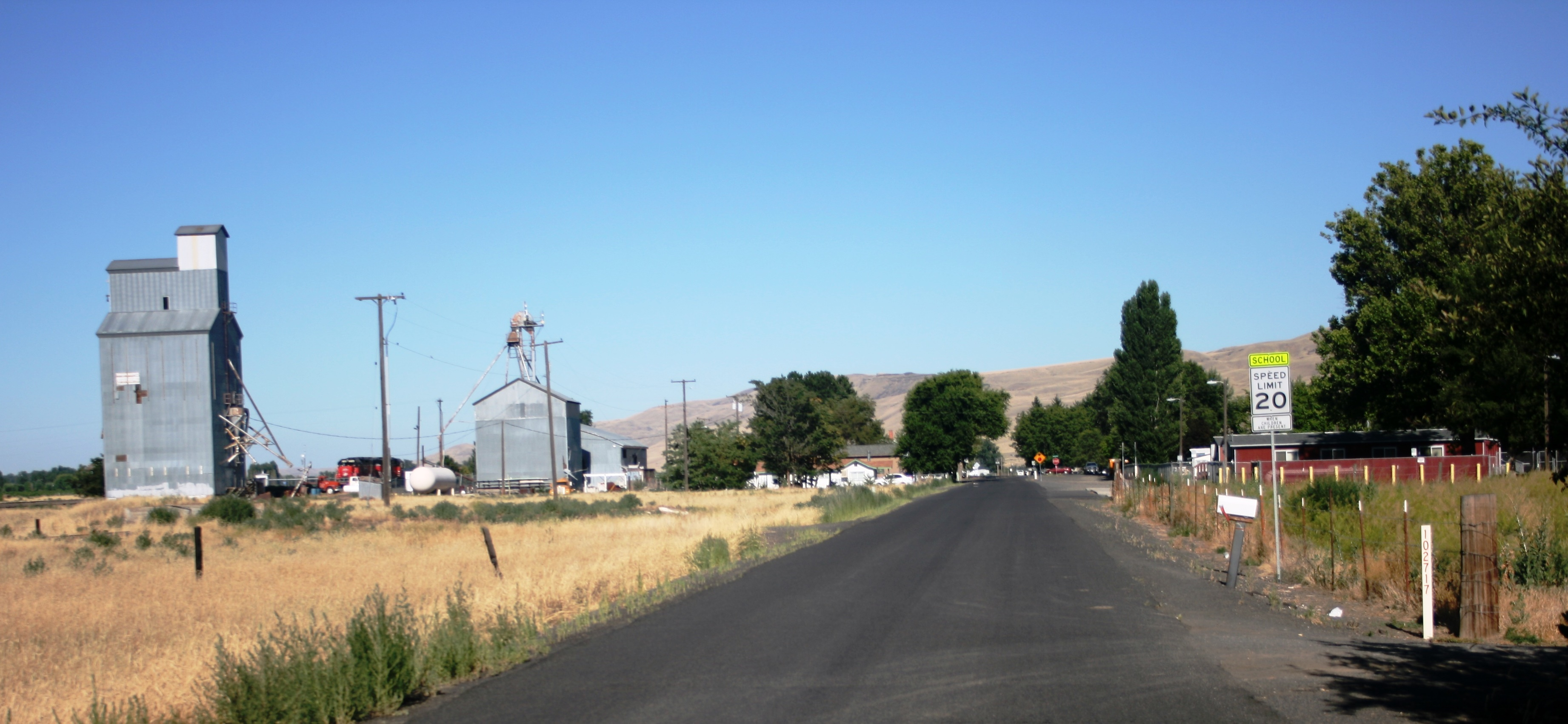
- Looking east in Whitstran.

- Location within Benton County, Washington
- Coordinates: 46°14′07″N 119°42′20″W
- Country: United States
- State: Washington
- County: Benton
- Elevation: 679 ft (207 m)
- Time zone: UTC-8 (Pacific (PST))
  - Summer (DST): UTC-7 (PDT)
- ZIP code: 99350
- Area code: 509
- FIPS code: 53-78540
- GNIS feature ID: 1512805

Whitstran is a small, unincorporated community in Benton County, Washington, located approximately four miles Northeast of Prosser and approximately ten miles west of Benton City. The focal point of the community is at the intersection of North Rothrock Road and Foisy Road, where there is a small grocery store, and nearby Whitstran Elementary School.

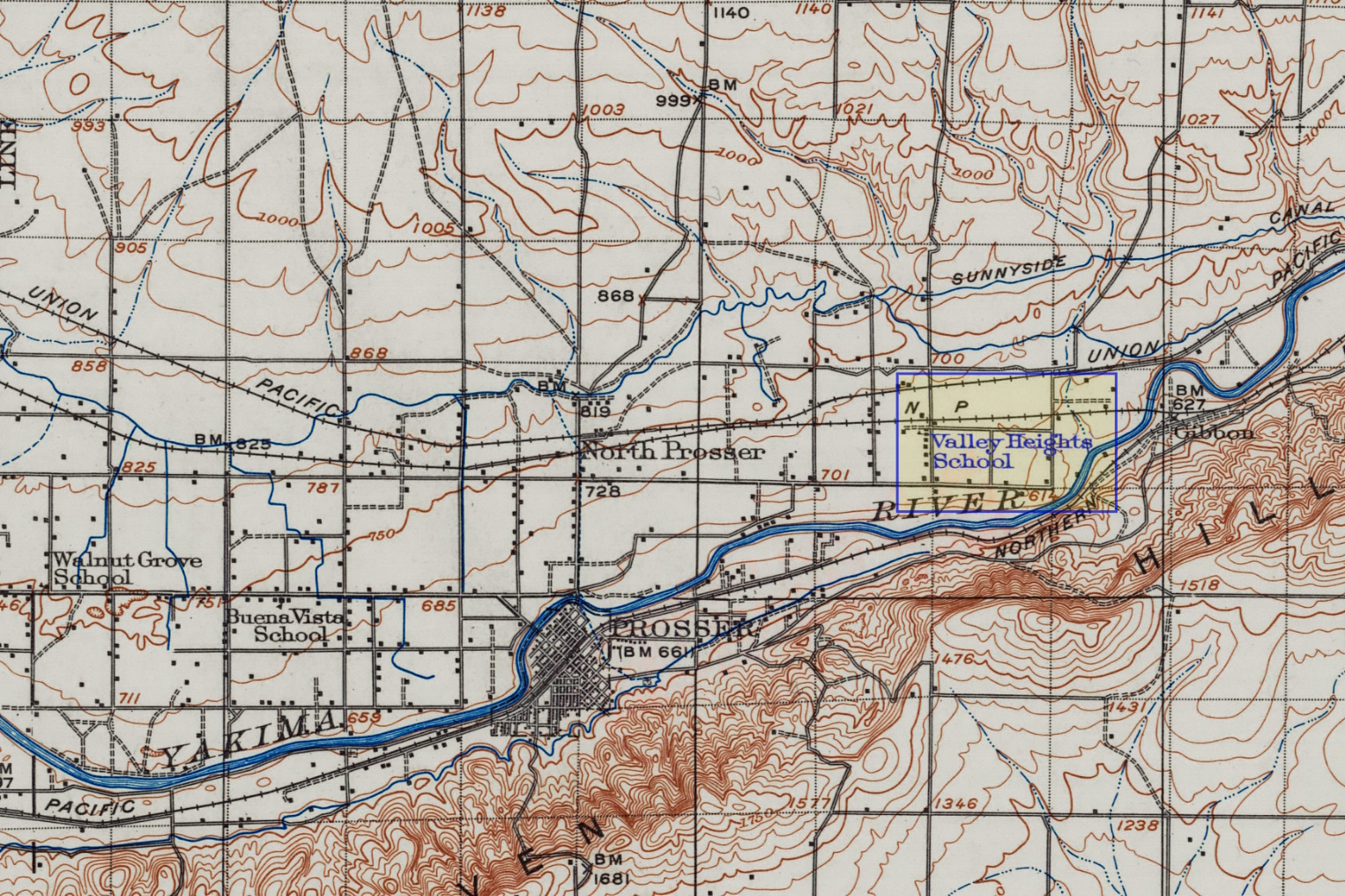
1915 topographical map depicting previous place name of Valley Heights

1926 Road map

== History ==
The settlement of Valley Heights originated in 1907 when Seattle developer Charles Jorgen Smith, purchased property in present-day Whitstran, which became known as Valley Heights Orchard Tracts. It was also called Swede Settlement for a time because of a number of Scandinavians who purchased property in the area. A rail line was built in 1911 and a town site was platted by Mary Biggam. By 1919 the community began to be known as Whitstran and the name Valley Heights eventually faded from use.

The community's name was changed to Whitstran by the Northern Pacific Railway in honor of two retired railroad nurses, Laura Whitaker and May A. Strangeways, who were cousins who developed a small acreage nearby.

Another source indicates that the town was named by the North Yakima and Valley Railway Company in honor of a landowner from whom a right-of-way had been acquired. The railway station was previously known as Whitstran Spur.

E.W. Fry built the first store in Whitstran in 1916. Jim McCorkle has owned the store, now known as McCorkle's, since 1993. Previously it was known as Blake's Corner Market and Whitstran Trading Company.

In the 1950s, a new school replaced the previous one room school. The school is now Whitstran Elementary School.

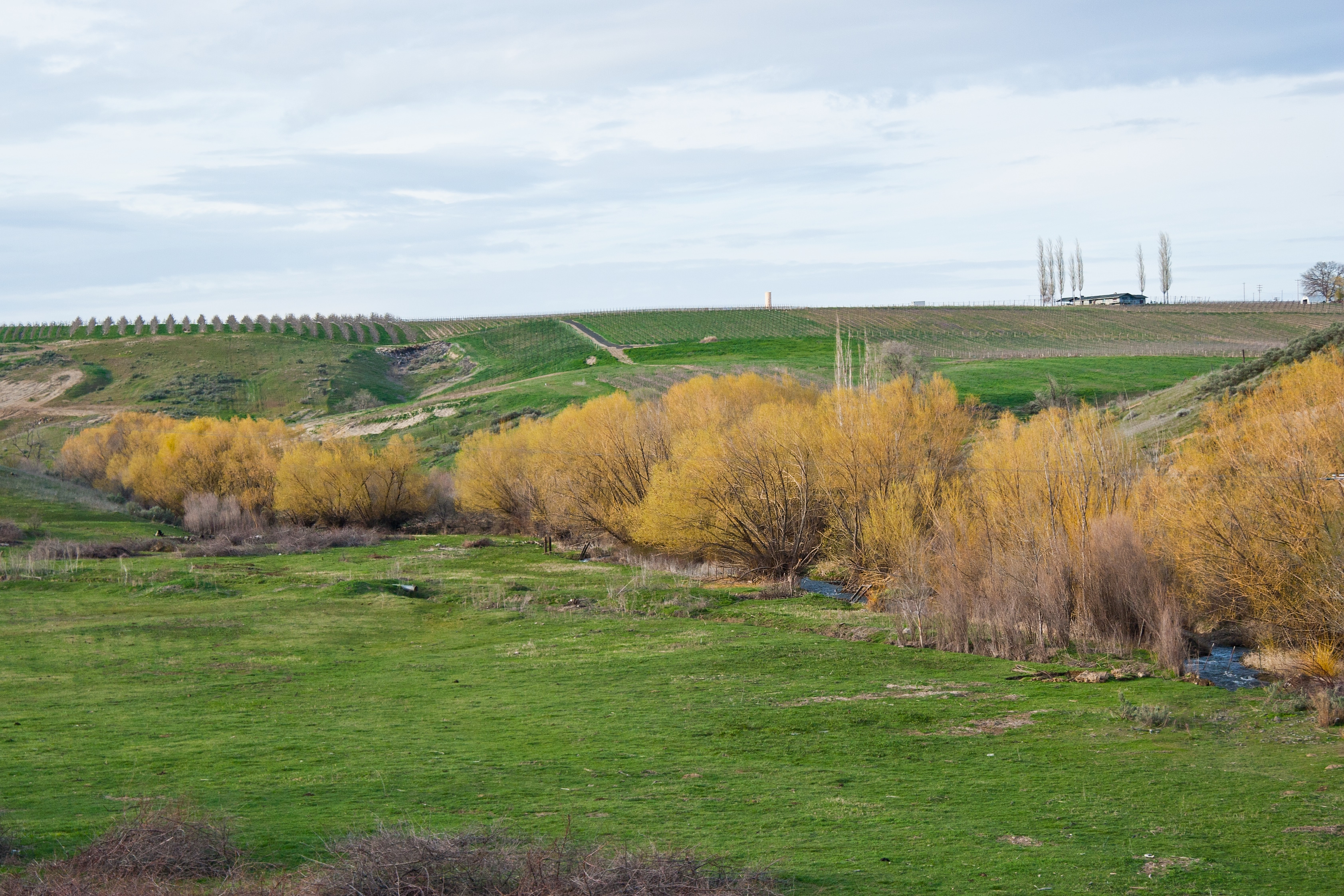
Snipes Creek Canyon

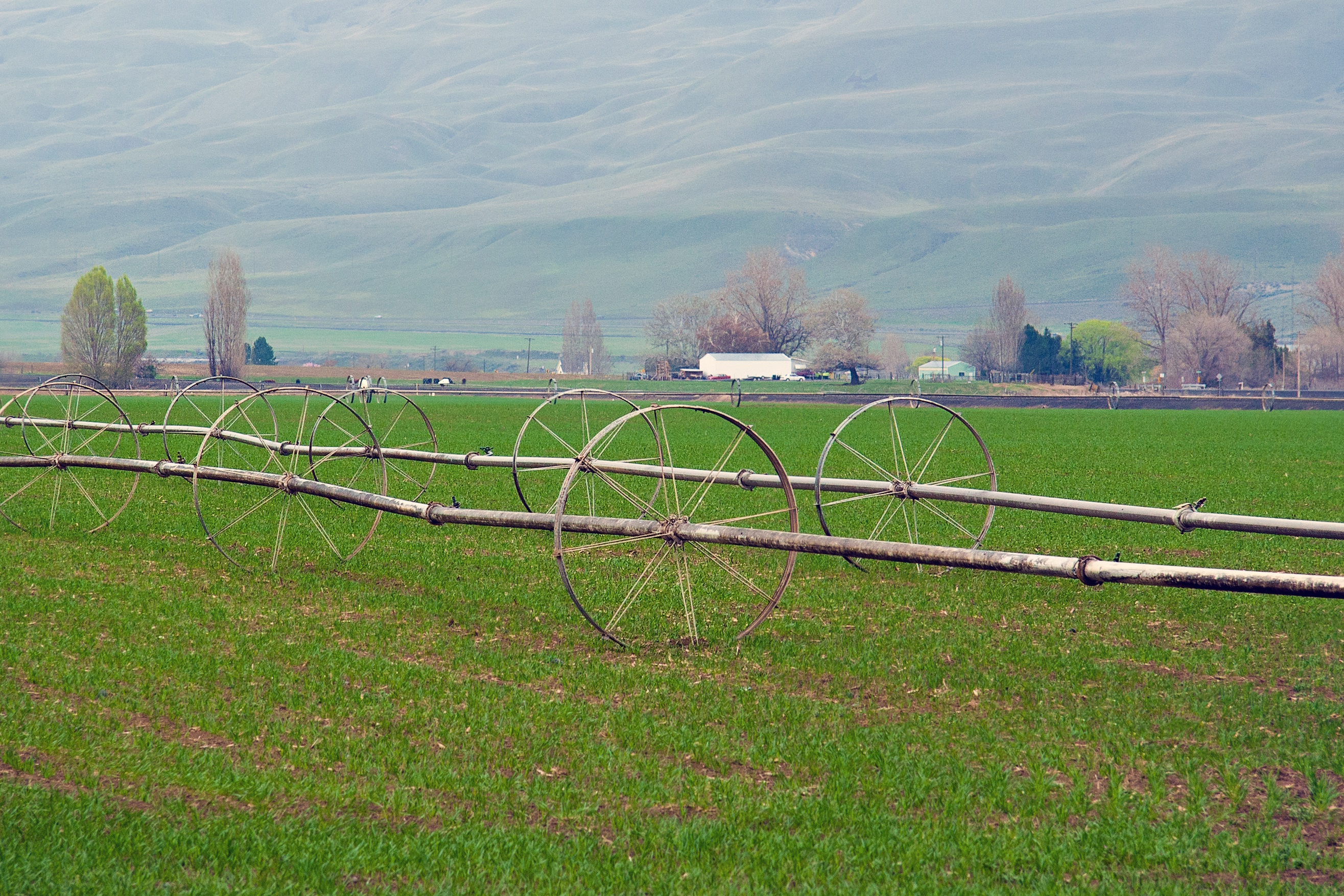
Irrigation System in Whitstran

== Schools ==
- Whitstran Elementary School Grades K-5
