= USS Harder =

Two ships of the United States Navy have borne the name USS Harder, named in honor of the harder, a fish of the mullet family found off South Africa.

- USS Harder (SS-257), was a Gato-class submarine, commissioned in 1942 and sunk in 1944. The vessel's wreck was found in 2024.
- USS Harder (SS-568), was a Tang-class submarine, commissioned in 1952 and stricken in 1974
