= Gibbon, Washington =

Unincorporated community in Washington, United States

- Unincorporated community
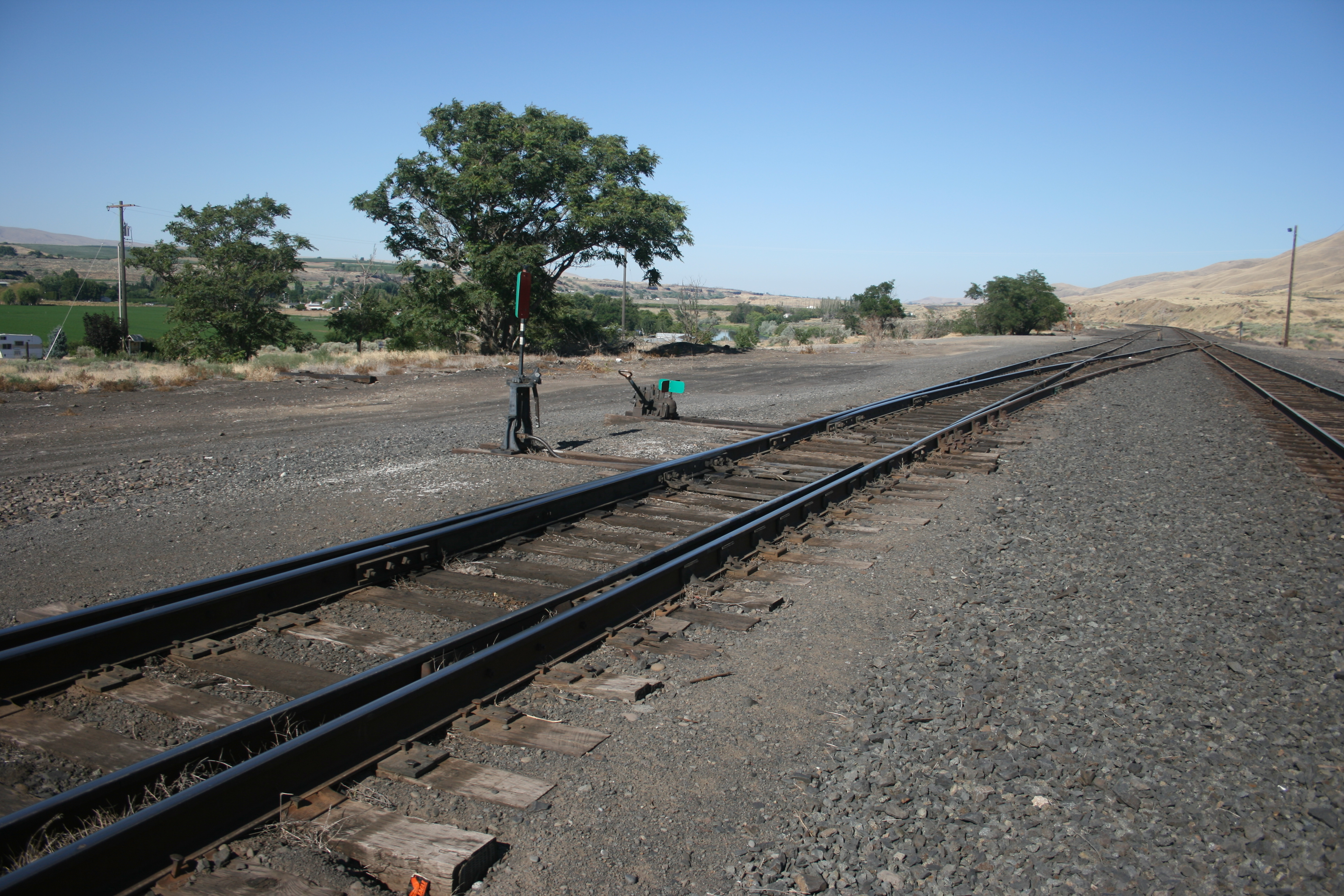

- Location within Benton County, Washington
- Coordinates: 46°14′09″N 119°39′42″W
- Country: United States
- State: Washington
- County: Benton
- Elevation: 643 ft (196 m)
- Time zone: UTC-8 (Pacific (PST))
  - Summer (DST): UTC-7 (PDT)
- ZIP code: 99350
- Area code: 509
- GNIS feature ID: 1511509

Gibbon is an unincorporated community in Benton County, Washington, United States, between Prosser and Benton City.

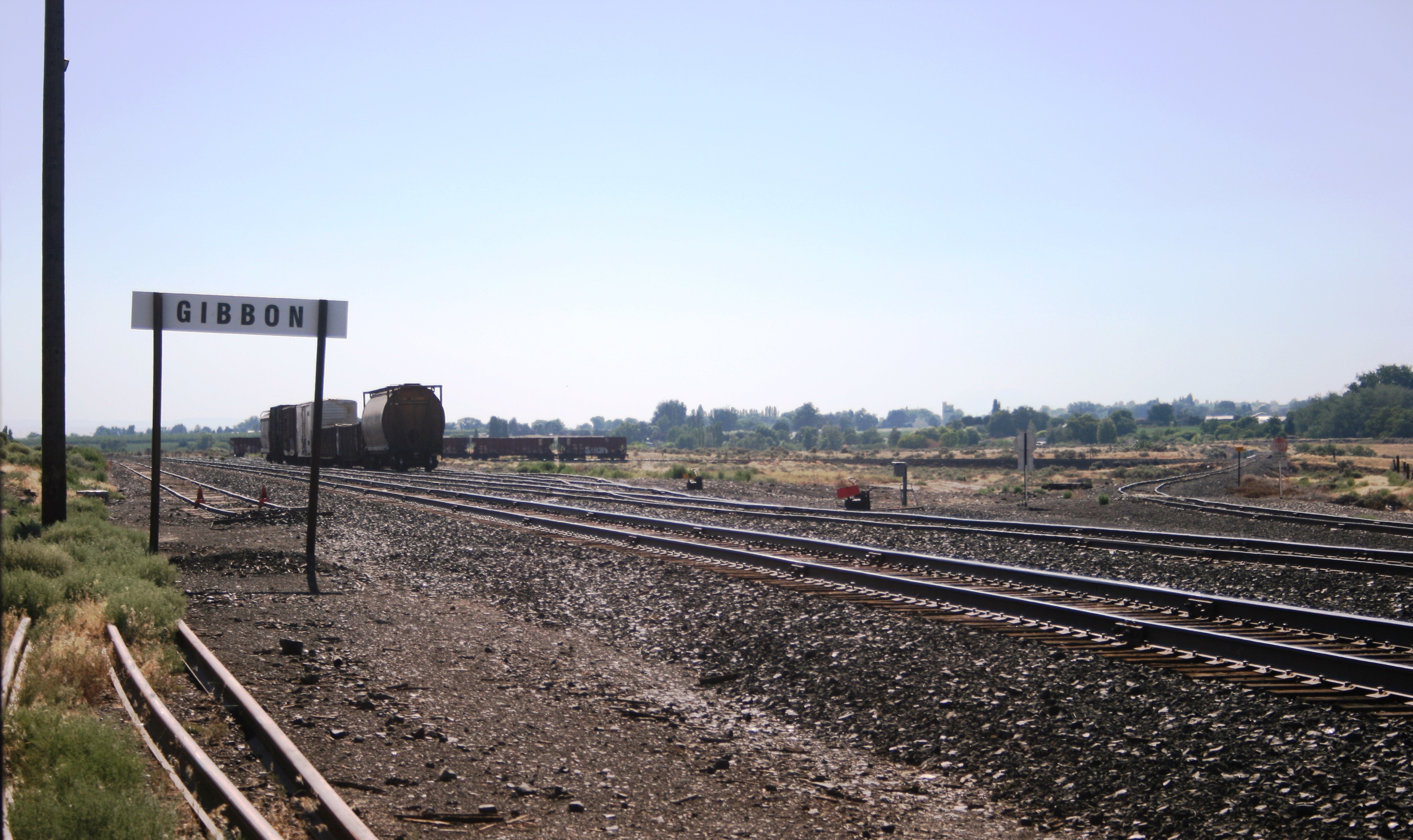
View looking west toward Prosser

The community, primarily a railroad junction, was founded as Bender by the Northern Pacific Railway Company in 1884. In April 1896, Bender's name was changed to Gibbon in honor of U.S. Army General John Gibbon who died that same year.
