= Berrian, Washington =

Unincorporated community in Washington, United States

- Unincorporated community
- Location within Benton County, Washington
- Coordinates: 45°56′15″N 119°09′07″W
- Country: United States
- State: Washington
- County: Benton
- Elevation: 354 ft (108 m)
- Time zone: UTC-8 (Pacific (PST))
  - Summer (DST): UTC-7 (PDT)
- ZIP code: 99337
- Area code: 509
- GNIS feature ID: 1510821

Berrian was an unincorporated community in Benton County, Washington, located approximately nine miles east of Umatilla, Oregon, on the north bank of the Columbia River.

The community was named after Augustus F. Berrian, who settled in the area in 1884. In February 1913, the community was officially platted by the Commercial Orchard Land Company. Berrian had a post office from April 25, 1913, to April 30, 1949.
