= Walla Walla people =

Walla Walla
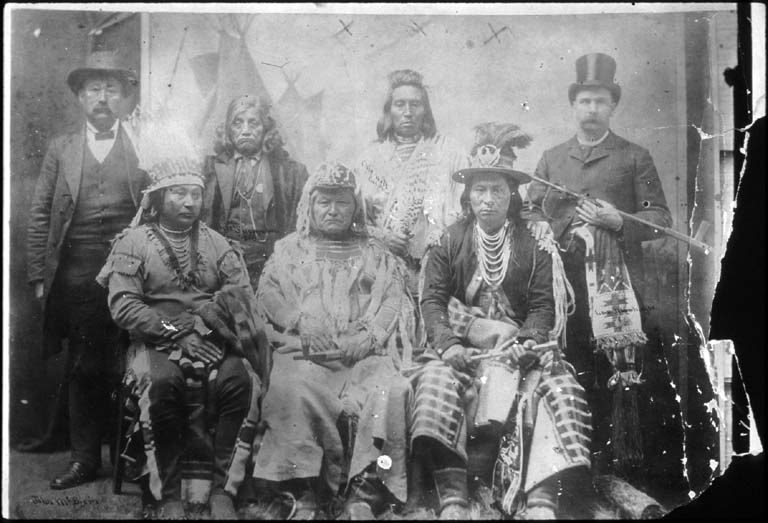
- Illustration of Sahaptin tribal representatives to Washington D.C. in 1890

Total population
- 383 (2010)

Regions with significant populations
- United States (Oregon)

Languages
- English, Sahaptin dialect (endangered)

Religion
- Traditional Religion (Washat), Christianity (incl. syncretistic forms)

Related ethnic groups
- Sahaptin-speaking Umatilla, Cayuse, Yakama

The Walla Walla (/ˌwɒlə/), Walawalałáma ("People of Walula region along Walla Walla River"), sometimes Walúulapam, are a Sahaptin Indigenous people of the Northwest Plateau. The duplication in their name expresses the diminutive form. The name Walla Walla is translated several ways but most often as "many waters".

Many of the Walla Walla live on the Confederated Tribes of the Umatilla Indian Reservation. They share land and a governmental structure with the Cayuse and the Umatilla tribes as part of the Confederated Tribes of the Umatilla. The reservation is located in the area of Pendleton, Oregon, United States, near the Blue Mountains. Some Walla Walla are also enrolled in the federally recognized Confederated Tribes and Bands of the Yakama Nation.

== History ==
The people are a Sahaptin-speaking tribe that traditionally inhabited the interior Columbia River region of the present-day northwestern United States. For centuries before the coming of European settlers, the Walla Walla, consisting of three principal bands, occupied the territory along the Walla Walla River (named for them) and along the confluence of the Snake and Columbia River rivers in a territory that is now part of northeastern Oregon and southeastern Washington states. From this zone, the Walla Walla followed a pattern of seasonal subsistence practices similar to that of the Yakama, Palouse, Umatilla, and Wanapum tribes.

=== Contact with Europeans ===
The first encounter with Euro-Americans for the Walla Walla was the Lewis and Clark Expedition. At the first meeting in 1805, the Americans promised Walla Walla chief Yellepit that they would visit with the people after seeing the Pacific Ocean. The party returned in April 1806 and stayed at Yellepit's village, located on the Columbia River near the mouth of the Walla Walla River. During a transaction Yellepit presented Clark with a white horse in return for a copper kettle. The Americans had none in supply, however, so Clark gave Yellepit his own sword, along with a quantity of gunpowder and musket balls. Lewis and Clark also gave Yellepit a peace medal engraved with a portrait of President Thomas Jefferson, to be worn around the neck, and a small United States flag. Yellepit, Washington was later named after the chief.

David Thompson of the Canadian-British North West Company (NWC) was the next European in the Walla Walla lands, arriving in 1811. About five miles upriver from Yellepit's village on the confluence of the Snake River and the Columbia, Thompson ordered a pole be placed. An attached letter to the pole claimed the territory for the British Crown and stated the NWC intended to build a trading post at the site. Thompson's pole and letter were intended for the traders of the Pacific Fur Company, an American rival of the NWC. Continuing downriver, Thompson stopped at Yellepit's village and discovered the flag and medal left by the Americans. Thompson found Yellepit very friendly and intelligent, and the chief encouraged the plan to set up a nearby trading post.

For various reasons the post was not built until 1818, when the NWC established Fort Nez Perces at the mouth of the Walla Walla River. During the summer of 1811, Thompson had met also with the Walla Walla head chief, Tumatapum, and his equal-ranking Quillquills Tuckapesten, Nimipu head chief; Ollicott, Cayuse head chief; and, probably, Kepowhan, Palus head chief; and Illim-Spokanee, Spokane head chief.

The Walla Walla eventually adopted the practice of maintaining cattle herds. They were known to go to New Helvetia in California during 1844 to secure additional livestock. An estimated 40 Walla Walla, Nez Perce and Cayuse under Walla Walla chief Piupiumaksmaks went on the expedition south. En route the party gathered stray horses, not aware the strays were stolen.

Negotiations at New Helvetia were held between one of Piupiumaksmaks' sons, Toayahnu, and an employee of Sutter. The two men entered a dispute, and Toayahnu was killed. Despite fears of retribution among Sutter's staff by the Walla Walla, Piupiumaksmaks returned with a small band of warriors and families in 1846 and declared peaceable intentions. When that party returned to the northern territory, they found that some members had been infected with measles, to which the Native Americans had no immunity. An epidemic began to spread across the Columbia Plateau, decimating indigenous populations. Smallpox and other diseases were also introduced into the area, adding to the Walla Walla population decline. Despite this, the Walla Walla still held extensive herds of horses, which constituted the "principal wealth" of the tribe.

The Walla Walla were one of the tribal nations at the 1855 Walla Walla Council (along with the Cayuse, Nez Perce, Umatilla, and Yakama), which signed the Treaty of Walla Walla.

== Notable Walla Walla ==
- Piupiumaksmaks (Yellow Hawk) (d. 1855), head chieftain of Walla Wallas
- James Lavadour (b. 1951), painter and printmaker
- Dan Henderson (b. 1970), Olympic wrestler and mixed martial artist
- Charles Sams (b. circa 1970), director of the U. S. National Park Service (2021-2025)
