= North Prosser, Washington =

Unincorporated community in Washington, United States

- Unincorporated community
- Location within Benton County, Washington
- Coordinates: 46°13′55″N 119°46′06″W
- Country: United States
- State: Washington
- County: Benton
- Elevation: 755 ft (230 m)
- Time zone: UTC-8 (Pacific (PST))
  - Summer (DST): UTC-7 (PDT)
- ZIP code: 99350
- Area code: 509
- GNIS feature ID: 1511192

North Prosser is an unincorporated community in Benton County, Washington, United States, located approximately one mile north of Prosser.

The community formed around a Northern Pacific Railway Company station which was built in 1917. It was named for its location just north of Prosser.
