= Harder, Washington =

Unincorporated community in Washington, United States

- Unincorporated community
- Location within Washington (state) Location within the United States
- Coordinates: 46°39′43″N 118°29′20″W
- Country: United States
- State: Washington
- County: Franklin
- Elevation: 922 ft (281 m)
- Time zone: UTC-8 (Pacific (PST))
  - Summer (DST): UTC-7 (PDT)
- Area code: 509
- GNIS feature ID: 1511023

Harder is an unincorporated community in Franklin County, Washington, United States.
