= Benton County, Washington =

County in Washington, United States

- County
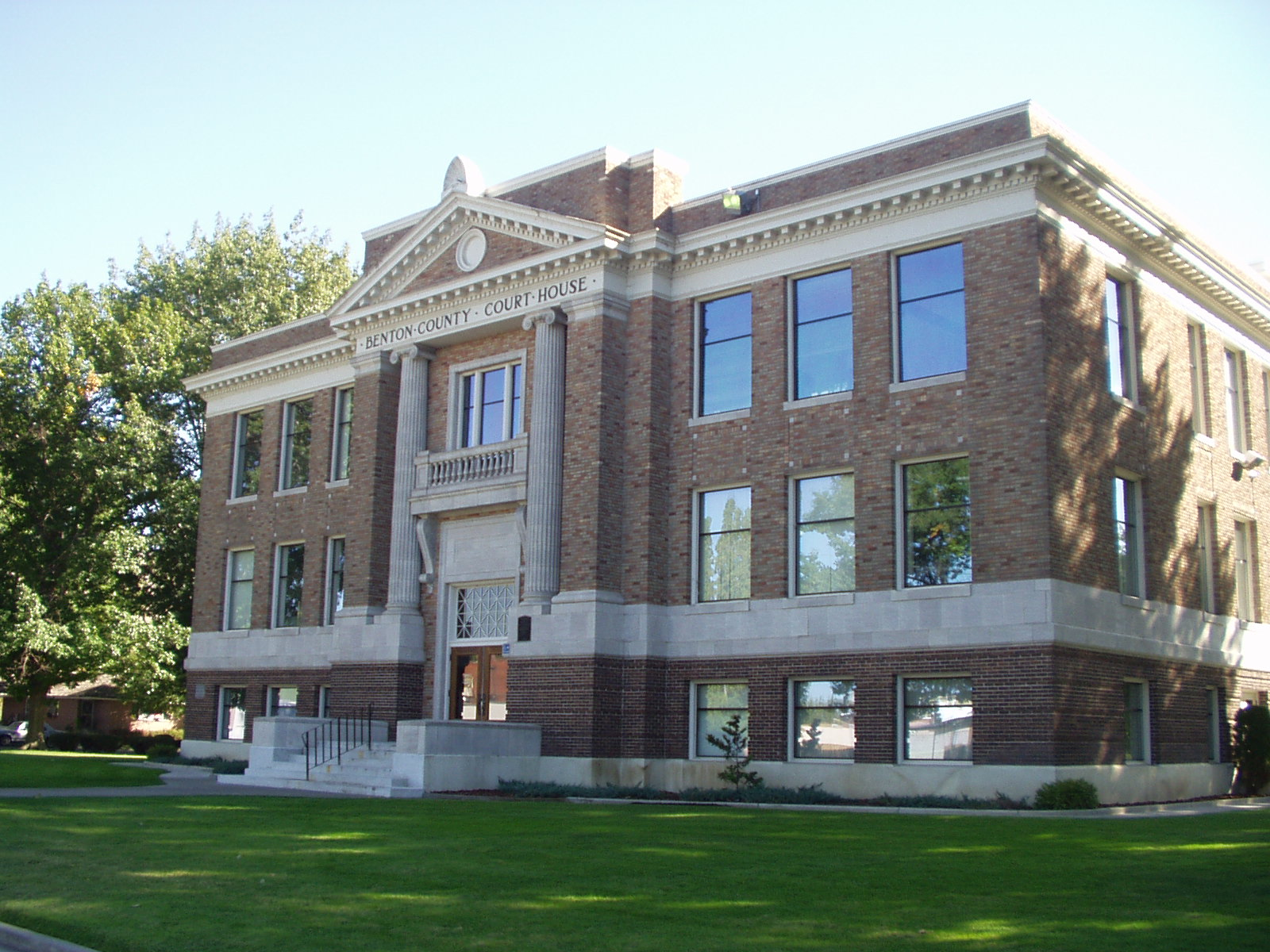
- Benton County Courthouse

- Seal

- Location within the U.S. state of Washington
- Coordinates: 46°15′N 119°30′W
- Country: United States
- State: Washington
- Founded: March 8, 1905
- Named for: Thomas Hart Benton
- Seat: Prosser
- Largest city: Kennewick

Area
  - Total: 1,760 sq mi (4,600 km^{2})
  - Land: 1,700 sq mi (4,400 km^{2})
  - Water: 60 sq mi (160 km^{2}) 3.4%

Population (2020)
  - Total: 206,873
  - Estimate (2025): 221,722 ▲
  - Density: 110/sq mi (42/km^{2})
- Time zone: UTC−8 (Pacific)
  - Summer (DST): UTC−7 (PDT)
- Congressional district: 4th
- Website: bentoncountywa.gov

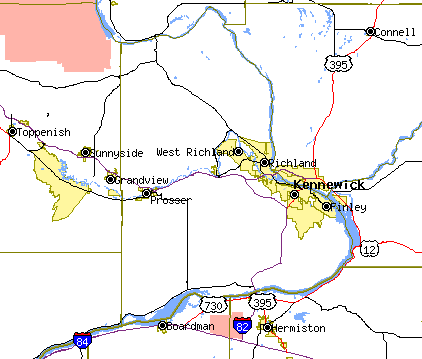
Benton County, Washington

Benton County is a county in the south-central portion of the U.S. state of Washington. As of the 2020 census, its population was 206,873. The county seat is Prosser, and its most populous city is Kennewick. The Columbia River demarcates the county's north, south, and east boundaries.

Benton County was created from what were then larger versions of Klickitat County and Yakima County on March 8, 1905, and was named after Missouri statesman Thomas Hart Benton.

== Geography ==
According to the United States Census Bureau, the county has a total area of 1,760 square miles (4,600 km^{2}), of which 1,700 square miles (4,400 km^{2}) is land and 60 square miles (160 km^{2}) (3.4%) is water. The highest point of land elevation within the county is the summit of Rattlesnake Mountain at 3,527 feet; and the lowest point of land elevation is along the southwestern shore of Crow Butte at 265 feet (fluctuates due to level of Columbia River).

=== Waterways ===
- Columbia River - Surrounds and forms the county's boundary on three sides. Barge trafficking is possible upriver to anchorage sites in northern Richland, the upstream extent of Lake Wallula which forms behind McNary Dam.
- Yakima River - Bisects the county from west to east, emptying into the Columbia River at Richland. As a water source, the Yakima is the lifesource for agriculture in the Yakima Valley. A shallow river, the Yakima is suitably navigable only for small, personal watercraft. Historically, the Yakima River supported some of the most bountiful migratory fish populations in the entire Columbia Basin, and many of those legendary salmon runs are now rebounding after decades of demise. Amon Creek is the most notable tributary of the Yakima River in Benton County, emptying into the mainstem river near the Yakima River Delta in Richland.

=== Mountains and ridges ===
- Horse Heaven Hills
- Rattlesnake Hills
  - Lookout Summit
  - Rattlesnake Mountain
- Jump Off Joe
- Badger Mountain
- Candy Mountain
- Red Mountain

=== Adjacent counties ===
- Grant County - north
- Franklin County - northeast
- Walla Walla County - east
- Umatilla County, Oregon - southeast
- Morrow County, Oregon - southwest
- Klickitat County - southwest
- Yakima County - west

=== National Protected Areas ===
- Hanford Reach National Monument (part)
- Manhattan Project National Historical Park (part)
- Saddle Mountain National Wildlife Refuge (part)
- Umatilla National Wildlife Refuge (part)

=== Major highways ===
- Interstate 82
- Interstate 182
- U.S. Route 12
- U.S. Route 395
- Washington State Route 14
- Washington State Route 240
- Washington State Route 397

== Demographics ==
Historical population
Census	Pop.	Note	%±
1910	7,937		—
1920	10,903		37.4%
1930	10,952		0.4%
1940	12,053		10.1%
1950	51,370		326.2%
1960	62,070		20.8%
1970	67,540		8.8%
1980	109,444		62.0%
1990	112,560		2.8%
2000	142,475		26.6%
2010	175,177		23.0%
2020	206,873		18.1%
2025 (est.)	221,722	▲	7.2%
U.S. Decennial Census; 1790–1960 1900–1990; 1990–2000 2010–2020

=== 2020 census ===
As of the 2020 census, the county had a population of 206,873. Of the residents, 26.2% were under the age of 18 and 15.7% were 65 years of age or older; the median age was 36.3 years. For every 100 females there were 98.9 males, and for every 100 females age 18 and over there were 96.9 males. 87.9% of residents lived in urban areas and 12.1% lived in rural areas.

Benton County, Washington – Racial and ethnic composition Note: the US Census treats Hispanic/Latino as an ethnic category. This table excludes Latinos from the racial categories and assigns them to a separate category. Hispanics/Latinos may be of any race.
Race / Ethnicity (NH = Non-Hispanic)	Pop 2000	Pop 2010	Pop 2020	% 2000	% 2010	% 2020
White alone (NH)	116,457	130,437	135,718	81.74%	74.46%	65.60%
Black or African American alone (NH)	1,227	2,031	2,621	0.86%	1.16%	1.27%
Native American or Alaska Native alone (NH)	964	1,280	1,191	0.68%	0.73%	0.58%
Asian alone (NH)	3,104	4,621	6,244	2.18%	2.64%	3.02%
Pacific Islander alone (NH)	126	221	536	0.09%	0.13%	0.26%
Other race alone (NH)	193	260	1,049	0.14%	0.15%	0.51%
Mixed race or Multiracial (NH)	2,598	3,631	10,175	1.82%	2.07%	4.92%
Hispanic or Latino (any race)	17,806	32,696	49,339	12.50%	18.66%	23.85%
Total	142,475	175,177	206,873	100.00%	100.00%	100.00%

The racial makeup of the county was 70.6% White, 1.4% Black or African American, 1.0% American Indian and Alaska Native, 3.1% Asian, 11.9% from some other race, and 11.7% from two or more races. Hispanic or Latino residents of any race comprised 23.8% of the population.

There were 76,369 households in the county, of which 34.4% had children under the age of 18 living with them and 23.5% had a female householder with no spouse or partner present. About 24.3% of all households were made up of individuals and 10.3% had someone living alone who was 65 years of age or older.

There were 80,076 housing units, of which 4.6% were vacant. Among occupied housing units, 67.9% were owner-occupied and 32.1% were renter-occupied. The homeowner vacancy rate was 0.9% and the rental vacancy rate was 5.8%.

=== 2010 census ===
As of the 2010 census, there were 175,177 people, 65,304 households, and 45,699 families residing in the county. The population density was 103.0 inhabitants per square mile (39.8/km^{2}). There were 68,618 housing units at an average density of 40.4 per square mile (15.6/km^{2}). The racial makeup of the county was 82.4% white, 2.7% Asian, 1.3% black or African American, 0.9% American Indian, 0.1% Pacific islander, 9.0% from other races, and 3.6% from two or more races. Those of Hispanic or Latino origin made up 18.7% of the population. In terms of ancestry, 22.3% were German, 13.4% were English, 12.5% were Irish, and 7.9% were American.

Of the 65,304 households, 36.4% had children under the age of 18 living with them, 53.8% were married couples living together, 11.1% had a female householder with no husband present, 30.0% were non-families, and 24.3% of all households were made up of individuals. The average household size was 2.66 and the average family size was 3.17. The median age was 35.6 years.

The median income for a household in the county was $57,354 and the median income for a family was $69,834. Males had a median income of $57,496 versus $36,575 for females. The per capita income for the county was $27,161. About 9.3% of families and 12.7% of the population were below the poverty line, including 19.3% of those under age 18 and 6.1% of those age 65 or over.

=== 2000 census ===
As of the 2000 census, there were 142,475 people, 52,866 households, and 38,063 families residing in the county. The population density was 84 people per square mile (32 people/km^{2}). There were 55,963 housing units at an average density of 33 per square mile (13/km^{2}). The racial makeup of the county was 86.2% White, 0.9% Black or African American, 0.8% Native American, 2.2% Asian, 0.1% Pacific Islander, 7.0% from other races, and 2.7% from two or more races. 12.5% of the population were Hispanic or Latino of any race. 18.1% were of German, 11.0% English, 9.1% United States or American and 8.4% Irish ancestry. 86.4% spoke English and 10.3% Spanish as their first language.

There were 52,866 households, out of which 38.20% had children under the age of 18 living with them, 57.60% were married couples living together, 10.20% had a female householder with no husband present, and 28.00% were non-families. 23.20% of all households were made up of individuals, and 7.70% had someone living alone who was 65 years of age or older. The average household size was 2.68 and the average family size was 3.17.

In the county, the population was spread out, with 29.70% under the age of 18, 8.60% from 18 to 24, 28.50% from 25 to 44, 22.90% from 45 to 64, and 10.30% who were 65 years of age or older. The median age was 34 years. For every 100 females there were 98.70 males. For every 100 females age 18 and over, there were 96.30 males.

The median income for a household in the county was $47,044, and the median income for a family was $54,146. Males had a median income of $45,556 versus $27,232 for females. The per capita income for the county was $21,301. About 7.80% of families and 10.30% of the population were below the poverty line, including 14.30% of those under age 18 and 6.90% of those age 65 or over.

== Government ==
Benton County is one of the 33 counties in Washington that operates under the non-chartered "commission" or "plural executive" form of government. Three commissioners share administrative aegis with several other partisan officials independently elected to four-year terms of office. Judges of the superior court are also independently elected. In Benton County, the commissioners appoint a county administrator to oversee all departments that do not fall under other elected officials.

- Commissioner (District 1) - Jerome Delvin
- Commissioner (District 2) - Michael Alvarez
- Commissioner (District 3) - Will McKay

The County government is seated in Prosser, with many departments having satellite and auxiliary offices and facilities in Richland, Kennewick, and elsewhere. An attempt to move the county seat from Prosser to Kennewick resulted in a November 1984 ballot measure, which had 54.4 percent approval but failed to meet the required 60 percent threshold.

There are five incorporated cities within Benton County. The two larger cities—Kennewick and Richland—employ the "council-manager" form of government where the mayor is elected from the city council and serves a more ceremonial role, whereby direct administration of the city is the responsibility of the city manager. The three smaller cities—Benton City, Prosser, and West Richland—use the "mayor-council" form of government where the mayor is the chief administrator of the city and is directly elected by the citizens. In Washington, a majority of cities use the mayor-council form, but the council-manager structure is common among medium-sized municipalities.

Numerous special purpose districts with varying degrees of taxing and administrative authority such as port authorities and school districts oversee local responsibilities that are not a part of county or city governance.

== Politics ==
United States presidential election results for Benton County, Washington
Year	Republican		Democratic		Third party(ies)	
Year	No.	%	No.	%	No.	%
1908	891	57.74%	465	30.14%	187	12.12%
1912	728	19.11%	1,238	32.50%	1,843	48.39%
1916	1,460	45.43%	1,351	42.03%	403	12.54%
1920	2,001	52.01%	975	25.34%	871	22.64%
1924	1,812	45.33%	437	10.93%	1,748	43.73%
1928	2,650	69.94%	1,080	28.50%	59	1.56%
1932	1,694	36.85%	2,633	57.28%	270	5.87%
1936	1,610	35.56%	2,402	53.06%	515	11.38%
1940	2,670	51.96%	2,414	46.97%	55	1.07%
1944	3,905	47.79%	4,233	51.80%	34	0.42%
1948	5,852	40.45%	8,458	58.46%	157	1.09%
1952	13,412	57.40%	9,889	42.33%	63	0.27%
1956	13,807	53.99%	11,760	45.99%	4	0.02%
1960	13,797	52.37%	12,518	47.52%	29	0.11%
1964	11,708	41.27%	16,650	58.68%	14	0.05%
1968	14,659	51.29%	10,878	38.06%	3,042	10.64%
1972	18,517	61.02%	9,824	32.37%	2,005	6.61%
1976	22,135	63.95%	11,306	32.67%	1,170	3.38%
1980	28,728	64.68%	11,561	26.03%	4,124	9.29%
1984	32,307	69.28%	13,784	29.56%	540	1.16%
1988	28,688	65.18%	14,817	33.66%	511	1.16%
1992	22,883	43.50%	16,459	31.29%	13,260	25.21%
1996	26,664	49.56%	20,783	38.63%	6,356	11.81%
2000	38,367	64.18%	19,512	32.64%	1,900	3.18%
2004	44,350	66.31%	21,549	32.22%	987	1.48%
2008	45,345	62.19%	26,288	36.05%	1,278	1.75%
2012	49,461	62.17%	28,145	35.38%	1,953	2.45%
2016	47,194	56.46%	26,360	31.53%	10,038	12.01%
2020	60,365	58.59%	38,706	37.57%	3,962	3.85%
2024	59,555	59.15%	37,662	37.40%	3,476	3.45%

== Education ==
Benton County is serviced by six public school districts and a few smaller private schools.

=== Public education ===
Delta High School, located in Pasco, is a public high school specializing in the "STEM" fields of study (science, technology, engineering, mathematics). Delta High School is a collaborative venture of the Kennewick, Pasco, and Richland school districts, and is located in neighboring Franklin County, Washington. Prosser High School is located much closer to the county seat of Benton County.

=== Higher education ===
Two public college branch campuses are located in Benton County, each in Richland:

- Columbia Basin College - CBC is a community college conferring associates, transfer, and baccalaureate degrees with its main campus located in Pasco and a branch campus co-located with Delta High School in central Richland.
- Washington State University Tri-Cities - WSUTC is a branch of the Washington State University system based in Pullman, with a growing campus located in North Richland near the Pacific Northwest National Laboratory.

== Recreation ==
The Tri-City area's climate and distance to other metropolitan areas has made it a destination for tourism, particularly in outdoor recreation.

=== Golf courses ===
Benton County is home to seven publicly accessible golf courses:

- Canyon Lakes (Kennewick) – 7,026 yards | 73.8 / 131
- Columbia Park (Kennewick) – 2,447 yards
- Zintel Creek Golf Club (Kennewick) – 4,900 yards | 63.9 / 115
- Buckskin (Richland) - note: 9 holes
- Columbia Point (Richland) – 6,571 yards | 71.2 / 128
- Horn Rapids (Richland) – 7,060 yards | 74.0 / 139
- West Richland (West Richland) – 6,014 yards

A private golf and country club, Meadow Springs, is also located in Richland.

=== Museums ===
- Benton County Historical Museum
- East Benton County Historical Museum
- Hanford Reach Interpretive Center

=== Sports ===
The Tri-City Americans are a major junior hockey team and member of the Western Hockey League. They play at the Toyota Center in Kennewick. The Americans began as the Calgary Buffaloes in 1966, and after stints in Billings, Nanaimo, and New Westminster, moved to the Tri-Cities for the 1988–89 season where they were rebranded as the "Americans".

=== Public lands ===
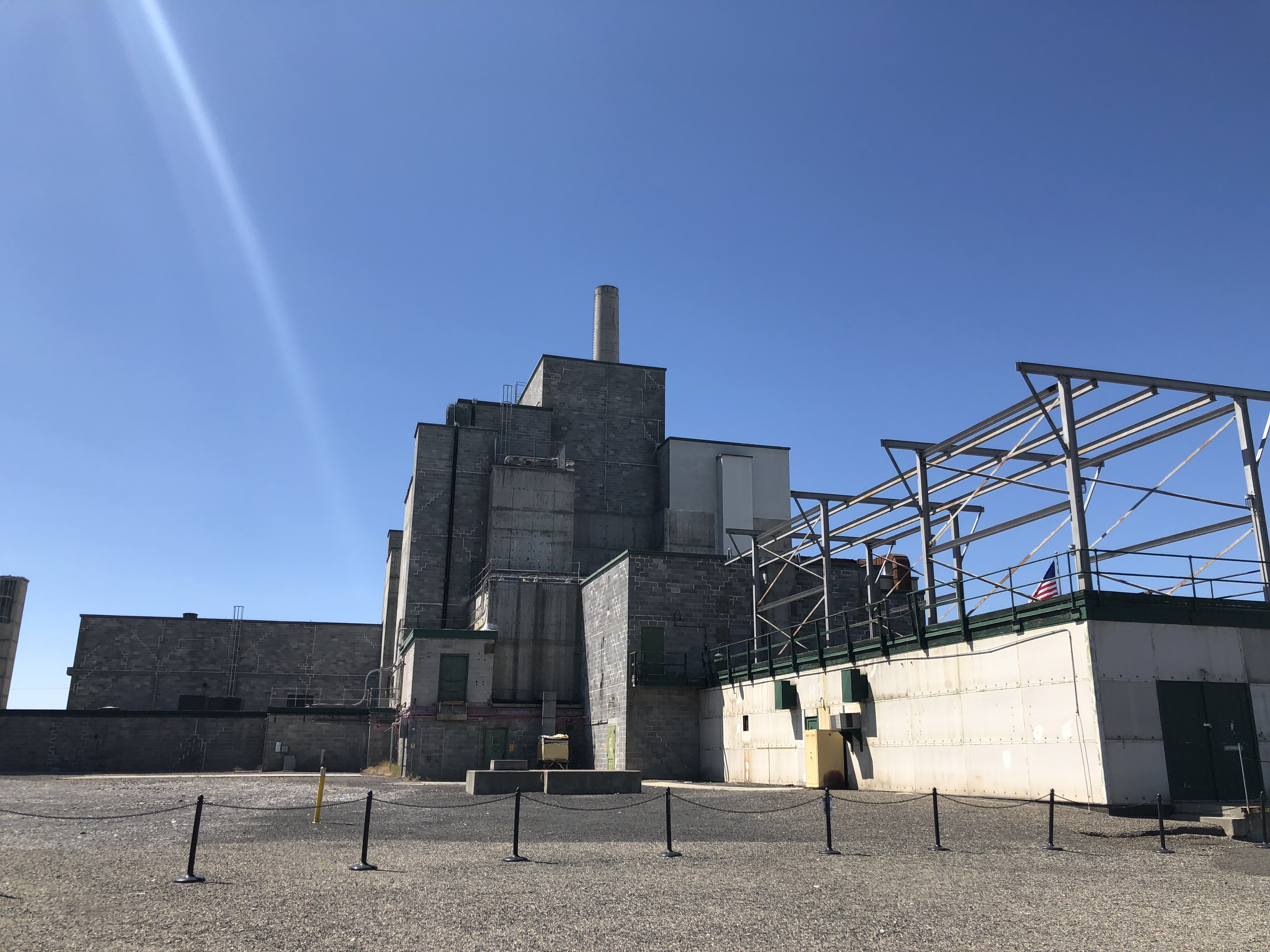
Exterior of the Hanford B Reactor, 2018

Public lands acreage account for about one-third of the total land area of Benton County. The most significant holding is the United States Department of Energy's Hanford Site, most of which has restricted public access. Hanford is a hub for "nuclear tourism" due to its role in the Manhattan Project and Cold War. Part of the Hanford Site acreage is also part of the Hanford Reach National Monument, which was established in 2000 by a presidential proclamation. Like with most of the rest of Hanford, most of the National Monument within Benton County is restricted from general public use.

Other federal land holdings in the county include small areas managed by the Bureau of Land Management, notably an aggregation along the Horse Heaven Hills south of Benton City that is popular with hikers; the U.S. Fish and Wildlife Service-owned islands and shorelands that are parts of the Umatilla and McNary National Wildlife Refugues; and U.S. Army Corps of Engineers properties along the Columbia River, most of which are managed for habitat and recreation by the county and cities.

State-owned public lands in Benton County include the Department of Fish and Wildlife's Rattlesnake Slope Wildlife Recreation Area north of Benton City. Benton County and the cities also own numerous parklands and open spaces, most notable the Badger Mountain Centennial Preserve, a hiking destination managed by the County located south of Richland which draws over 200,000 visits per year.

=== Viticulture ===
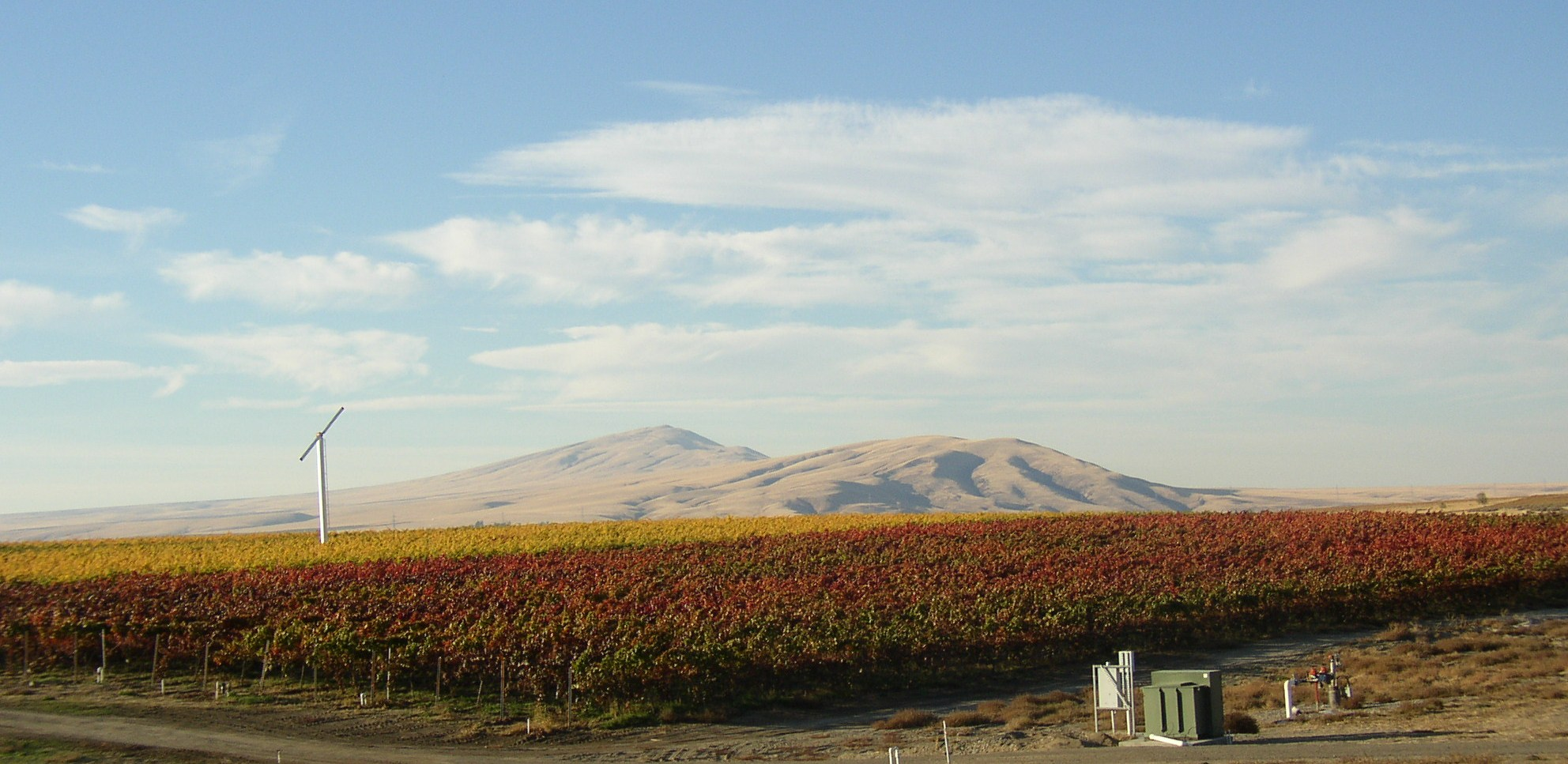
Kiona Vineyard in the Red Mountain AVA looking northwest toward Rattlesnake Mountain

The area of south-central Washington occupied by Benton County has been known primarily as an agricultural hub since its settlement. The rise of viticulture has had a profound impact on the agricultural and tourism industries over the past two decades, and has in many ways reshaped the reputation of the region.

The Yakima Valley AVA, part of which is located in Benton County, was the first American Viticultural Area established within Washington state, gaining the recognition in 1983. As the Washington wine industry began to focus more on terroir, three sub-appellations have been created for areas within the Yakima Valley AVA that demonstrate unique microclimates and soil conditions which crafted different wines from their neighboring areas. The Red Mountain AVA, which lies in its entirety on Benton County, was created in 2001. The county also includes part of the Horse Heaven Hills AVA which is part of the larger Columbia Valley AVA.

== Sites of interest ==
- Columbia Center Mall
- Columbia Park
- Hanford Reach National Monument: see also Hanford Reach Interpretive Center
- Hanford Site
- Ice Age Floods National Geologic Trail: Lake Lewis Section
- Irrigated Agriculture Research & Extension Center
- Laser Interferometer Gravitational-Wave Observatory (LIGO)
- McNary Dam
- Manhattan Project National Historical Park: B Reactor
- Toyota Center (Three Rivers Coliseum)
- Walter Clore Wine & Culinary Center

== Communities ==
=== Cities ===
- Benton City
- Kennewick
- Prosser (County seat)
- Richland
- West Richland

=== Census-designated place ===
- Finley

=== Other unincorporated communities ===
- Badger
- East White Bluffs
- Gibbon
- Highland
- Kiona
- Longview
- North Prosser
- Paterson
- Plymouth
- Ruby
- Whitstran

=== Ghost towns ===
- Berrian
- Hanford
- Horse Heaven
- Hover
- Mottinger
- White Bluffs
- Yellepit

== See also ==
- National Register of Historic Places listings in Benton County, Washington
- List of counties in Washington
