= Highland, Washington =

- Unincorporated community Former Census-designated place
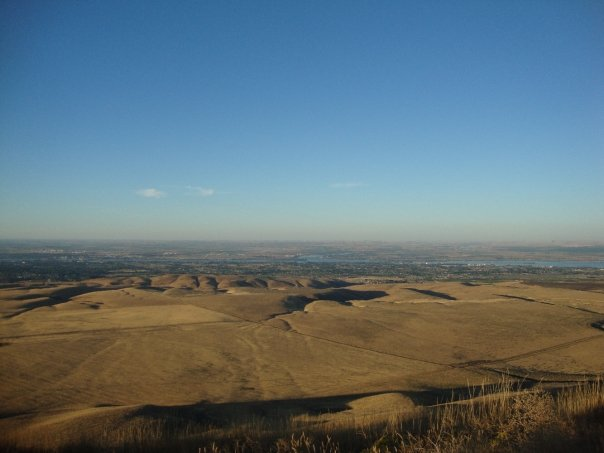
- Highland and Kennewick from atop nearby Jump off Joe.

- Location of Highland, Washington
- Coordinates: 46°08′10″N 119°07′38″W
- Country: United States
- State: Washington
- County: Benton

Area
  - Total: 27.6 sq mi (71.6 km^{2})
  - Land: 27.6 sq mi (71.5 km^{2})
  - Water: 0 sq mi (0.0 km^{2})
- Elevation: 1,086 ft (331 m)

Population (2000)
  - Total: 3,388
  - Density: 123/sq mi (47.4/km^{2})
- Time zone: UTC-8 (Pacific (PST))
  - Summer (DST): UTC-7 (PDT)
- FIPS code: 53-30775
- GNIS feature ID: 2408384

Highland is an unincorporated community and former census-designated place (CDP) in Benton County, Washington, United States. The population was 3,388 at the 2000 census. The CDP was dissolved prior to the 2010 U.S. census with a portion annexed to Kennewick city.

== Geography ==
According to the United States Census Bureau, the CDP had a total area of 27.6 square miles (71.6 km^{2}), of which, 27.6 square miles (71.5 km^{2}) of it is land and 0.04% is water.

== Demographics ==
Historical population
Census	Pop.	Note	%±
1990	3,656		—
2000	3,388		−7.3%
2010 (est.)	3,921

As of the census of 2000, there were 3,388 people, 1,108 households, and 935 families residing in the CDP. The population density was 122.6 people per square mile (47.4/km^{2}). There were 1,143 housing units at an average density of 41.4/sq mi (16.0/km^{2}). The racial makeup of the CDP is 92.38% White, 0.27% Black or African American, 0.38% Native American, 0.68% Asian, 0.03% Pacific Islander, 3.66% from other races, and 2.60% from two or more races. Hispanic or Latino of any race were 7.53% of the population.

There were 1,108 households, out of which 45.8% had children under the age of 18 living with them, 74.2% were married couples living together, 6.9% had a female householder with no husband present, and 15.6% were non-families. 11.6% of all households were made up of individuals, and 4.1% had someone living alone who was 65 years of age or older. The average household size was 3.04 and the average family size was 3.27.

In the CDP, the age distribution of the population shows 32.3% under the age of 18, 6.8% from 18 to 24, 28.5% from 25 to 44, 24.4% from 45 to 64, and 7.9% who were 65 years of age or older. The median age was 35 years. For every 100 females, there were 97.3 males. For every 100 females age 18 and over, there were 97.8 males.

The median income for a household in the CDP is $61,136, and the median income for a family was $63,333. Males had a median income of $47,094 versus $33,281 for females. The per capita income for the CDP was $22,703. About 4.5% of families and 6.1% of the population were below the poverty line, including 8.5% of those under age 18 and 0.8% of those age 65 or over.
