= Kamiakin High School =

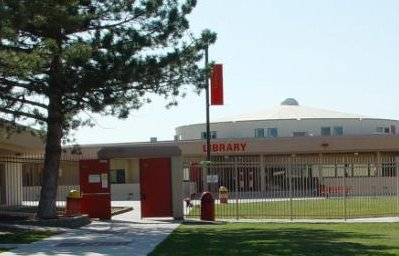
- Main entrance in 2008

Location
- 600 North Arthur Street; Kennewick, Washington 99336; United States; 46°13′02″N 119°11′17″W

Information
- Type: Public, four-year
- Motto: Be the best you can be!
- Established: 1970
- School district: Kennewick S.D. (#17)
- Superintendent: Traci Pierce
- Principal: Chris Chelin
- Teaching staff: 76.40 (FTE)
- Grades: 9th-12th
- Enrollment: 1,950 (2023-2024)
- Student to teacher ratio: 25.52
- Campus: Suburban
- Campus size: 30 acres (12 ha)
- Colors: Red; Gold
- Athletics: WIAA Class 4A, Greater Spokane/Mid-Columbia District Eight
- Athletics conference: Mid Columbia
- Mascot: Braves
- Nickname: KaHS
- Rivals: Southridge Suns; Kennewick Lions
- Newspaper: The TomaTalk
- Yearbook: Totem
- Feeder schools: Highlands Middle School; Desert Hills Middle School
- Information: 509-222-7000
- Website: Kamiakin.KSD.org
- References

Kamiakin High School is a public high school in Kennewick, Washington, the second of three comprehensive high schools in the Kennewick School District. Kamiakin opened in the fall of 1970 and serves the district's northwest portion. The school colors are scarlet and gold and the mascot is the Braves.

== Overview ==
The school is named after Kamiakin, a chief of the Yakama Tribe in the 19th century and a leader of the Native American side in the Yakama War.

Kamiakin went through a remodel from 2002 to 2004 that added 15 new classrooms, a new gymnasium and converted the existing lecture hall into an auditorium capable of seating 600 people as well as updating safety to meet standards throughout the campus.

== Academics ==
Kamiakin is generally considered to be one of the highest ranked public high schools in all of southeastern Washington of size 3A or 4A (along with Hanford High School in nearby Richland) and is ranked among the top 1,500 best high schools in the nation by Newsweek. Kamiakin's four year graduation rate is 89.4% and 92.4% after five years, around 13% higher than the state average.

=== Testing ===
In 2014, 511 AP exams were given, with 87% of students enrolled in one or more AP classes electing to take an exam. (Kamiakin is subsidizing AP tests starting in the 2015–2016 school year. Some teachers do require an AP test as a portion of the class. Each student may choose whether or not to take the test and must pay the reduced price should he or she decide to take it.) The school's HSPE (High School Proficiency Exam) scores annually rank higher than district and state averages with a passing rate around five percent higher than the state average in both reading and writing.

=== Running Start ===
Running Start is a program offered to Kamiakin students, as well as other Washington State students, in grades 11 and 12. Kamiakin Running Start students get the opportunity to earn both high school and college credits from college courses taken at the nearby Columbia Basin College in Pasco, Washington. Students do not pay tuition, but they are required to pay mandatory fees, buy their own books, and provide their own transportation.

=== Post Graduation ===
In 2014, 67% of Kamiakin graduates continued their education immediately after high school, 72% after two years, at a postsecondary school, 5% higher than the state average. Of the 67% choosing to further their education 84% choose to do so in state, 49% of whom choose to attend Columbia Basin College.

== Athletics ==
The school has 19 varsity teams, 12 junior varsity teams and nine "C" teams. Kamiakin's football and soccer teams play their home games at Neil F. Lampson Stadium, while a majority of the other varsity sports compete on campus.

=== Classification ===
Kamiakin competes in WIAA Class 3A, with the state's second largest group of schools.

Kamiakin is one of eight schools in the hybrid 3A/4A Mid-Columbia Conference, along with Chiawana, Hanford, Kennewick, Pasco, Richland, Southridge, and Walla Walla high schools. Kamiakin is one of only seven schools with the 3A classification in the state's Yakima Valley District Five, which includes Benton, Kittitas, Klickitat and Yakima counties.

=== State championships ===
- Baseball: 1994, 2012
- Girls basketball: 1985
- Boys cross country: 2017, 2018, 2019, 2021
- Football: 2016
- Boys golf: 1989, 1990
- Girls gymnastics: 2011, 2014, 2015, 2016
- Fastpitch Softball: 2012, 2013, 2014
- Girls tennis: 1999, 2008
- Boys track and field: 2019
- Girls track and field: 1998, 1999, 2012, 2013, 2014, 2015
- Boys wrestling: 1973

== Controversies ==
At a regular season football game in October 2018, the student spirit leader of the school-sponsored group, "Run Kano", encouraged pro-Trump and anti-Latino chants and rhetoric, including the waving of a Trump "MAGA" flag. This fueled racial tension on campus to new heights. Student activists at the school confronted district leadership and organized a protest against the school and district for not handling this situation fairly. The protests, which featured dozens of Kamiakin students, shed a light on the racial issues that existed. The racial issues at Kamiakin, following the incident, has even received national attention.

On September 20, 2025, a 14-year-old student was arrested after investigators uncovered potential plans for a school shooting.

== Alumni ==
- Scot Pollard – 1993 – former center for the Pistons, Kings, Pacers, Cavaliers and Celtics (NBA); former reality television contestant, competing on Survivor season 32
- Mike Reilly – Transferred – former quarterback in the NFL and CFL
- Trystan Vrieling – 2019 – professional baseball player in the New York Yankees organization
- Ron Wright – 1994 – former designated hitter for the Seattle Mariners (MLB)
