= Richland School District (Washington) =

School district in Washington, United States

Richland School District #400 serves the cities of Richland and West Richland, Washington.

As of 2020, it serves approximately 13,900 students in grades pre-kindergarten through grade 12.

The school district operates a total of 21 schools, including elementary, middle, and high schools. It also operates an early learning center and a virtual online program. The school district houses students in Delta High School and Tri-Tech Skills Center in partnership with both the Kennewick and Pasco school districts.

The school district's superintendent, Shelley Redinger, has been serving since June 2020.

== Schools ==
=== Elementary schools ===
- Badger Mountain Elementary
- Desert Sky Elementary, located in West Richland
- Jason Lee Elementary
- Jefferson Elementary
- Lewis & Clark Elementary
- Marcus Whitman Elementary
- Sacajawea Elementary
- Tapteal Elementary, located in West Richland
- White Bluffs Elementary
- William Wiley Elementary, located in West Richland
- Orchard Elementary

=== Middle schools ===
- Chief Joseph Middle School
- Carmichael Middle School
- Enterprise Middle School, located in West Richland
- Leona Libby Middle School, located in West Richland

=== High schools ===
- Delta High School, in partnership with the Kennewick and Pasco school districts
- Hanford High School, located in northern Richland
- Richland High School, located in central Richland
- River's Edge Alternative High School

=== Schools that are closed ===
- Spalding Elementary School (constructed in 1940's, now Liberty Christian School)
- Hanford Elementary School
- Hanford Middle School

=== Stadium ===
- Fran Rish Stadium

== Noteworthy incidents ==
- Elias Huizar, a former Richland School District employee and an alleged child rapist, shot and killed his ex-wife in front of William Wiley Elementary School in 2024.
