= Edgar Brown Memorial Stadium =

Memorial Stadium in Washington

- Interactive map of Edgar Brown Memorial Stadium
- Location: 1611 W. Sylvester Street, Pasco, Washington, U.S.
- Coordinates: 46°14′5.94″N 119°6′46.02″W
- Owner: Pasco School District
- Capacity: 5,300
- Surface: FieldTurf

Construction
- Opened: September 13, 1957
- Renovated: 2004

Tenants
- Pasco High School; Chiawana High School

Edgar Brown Memorial Stadium is the home stadium for the Chiawana Riverhawks and Pasco High School Bulldogs of Pasco, Washington, United States. The football, soccer and track-and-field teams for high schools in the Pasco School District play their home games at "Edgar Brown", as it is commonly called.

As well as being the home of the Pasco High Bulldogs for sports and Chiawana High Riverhawks for football, the stadium is home to the Pasco Invitational, the nation's oldest high school track-and-field single-day competition, and the largest single day track-and-field competition of any kind, which is always held on the first weekend of April.

== History ==
The stadium was built inside the bowl of a former gravel pit used in the construction of the Pioneer Memorial Bridge (now referred locally as the Blue Bridge), which links Kennewick and Pasco, Washington. As Pasco grew, citizens considered the gravel pit to be an eyesore that did not fit with the expanding city. Eventually, the land's owner Edgar Brown sold the property to the school district for $25,000, and Brown stipulated that the land must be used for a stadium. At the time Pasco High School had been playing their games at the junior high school.

On Friday, September 13, 1957, Pasco High School played their first game against Walla Walla High School and won the game 16–14. Up until an hour and a half before the game started, school superintendent Herman Haeger feared the stadium would not be ready as only three of the six towers of lights functioned properly.

On April 14, 1962 the first annual 'Pasco Invitational' occurred. The invitational hosted entrants from eight schools in the area, with Eisenhower High School from Yakima winning the team scoring with 55 points, and rounding out the top-three were Kennewick High School and Pasco High School with 45 and 42 points respectively.

In 2002, a voter-approved bond issue funded a major renovation of the stadium, which included the partial-demolition of the former Emerson Elementary which was transformed into a Boys & Girls Club. Emerson Elementary received a new building north of the stadium. A community-led fund-raising effort later added a FieldTurf playing surface to the stadium, making it the second stadium in the Tri-City area to have an artificial turf stadium (Neil F. Lampson Stadium in nearby Kennewick was the first).

With the opening of Chiawana High School in 2009, Chiawana played its first game at Edgar Brown Memorial Stadium against Hanford High School on September 11, 2009. Chiawana High School won the game with a score of 21–14 marking their first win at Edgar Brown Memorial Stadium and the first football win for the school.

== Name ==
Edgar Brown Memorial Stadium was named after Edgar Monroe Brown who owned the land where the stadium now resides. Brown sold the property to the school district for $25,000, and for the deal to be finalized Brown stipulated that the land must be used for a stadium. Brown died and was buried during the spring of 1957 before the stadium hosted its first event on September 13 of the same year. Before the opening of the stadium, a decision was made to name the stadium in honor of Mr. Brown and the name has remained ever since.
