= Hodgins =

Hodgins is a surname. Notable people

- Adam King Hodgins (1859–1932), Conservative member of the Canadian House of Commons
- Archie Latimer Hodgins (1876–1966), Progressive party member of the Canadian House of Commons
- Art Hodgins (1927–1988), Canadian ice hockey player
- Charlie Hodgins (born c. 1880), Australian rugby union player
- David Hodgins (1850-1930), member of the Wisconsin Legislature
- Dick Hodgins, Jr., American cartoonist
- Eric Hodgins (1899–1971), American author
- George Frederick Hodgins (1865–1940), merchant and political figure in Quebec
- Isabel Hodgins (born 1993), English actress
- Isaiah Hodgins (born 1998), American football player
- Jack Hodgins (born 1938), Canadian novelist and short story writer
- Jack Hodgins (Bones), a fictional character from the TV series Bones
- James Hodgins (born 1977), free agent fullback with National Football League experience
- John Hodgins (born 1962), Irish retired sportsman
- Liam Hodgins, three time captain of the Galway senior hurling team
- Mark Hodgins (born 1947), Alaska politician
- Philip Hodgins (1959–1995), prize-winning Australian poet
- Robert Hodgins (1920–2010), South African artist
- Thomas Hodgins (1828–1910), Ontario lawyer and political figure
- Thomas D. Hodgins, Ontario politician
- William H. Hodgins (1856–1912), American law enforcement officer and police captain in the NYPD
- William Thomas Hodgins (1857–1909), farmer and political figure in Ontario Canada
- Karen Murray-Hodgins, basketball player

== See also ==
- Hodgin (disambiguation)
