= Kennewick High School =

Location
- 560 West 6th Avenue; Kennewick, Washington; United States; 46°12′14″N 119°07′27″W

Information
- Type: Public
- Established: 1904
- Principal: Ron King
- Teaching staff: 80.06 (FTE)
- Enrollment: 1,929 (2023-2024)
- Student to teacher ratio: 24.09
- Colors: Orange & black
- Mascot: Lion
- Newspaper: Lion's Roar
- Yearbook: Keewaydin
- Website: kennewick.ksd.org

Kennewick High School is a public high school located in eastern Kennewick, Washington. It was founded in 1904 to serve the educational needs of the new city of Kennewick. It is one of only a few schools to have its music department honored with the title of "Grammy Signature School". The school is part of the Kennewick School District.

The current building, constructed in 1954 and originally named Edwin S. Black Senior High School, is located at 500 S. Dayton St., and incorporates the remainder of the second high school building, which until 1966 served as Park Junior High School (now known as Park Middle School) as an annex. Both buildings were renovated in the mid-1990s, the annex first, then the main building. The first building has long since been demolished, the location became until 1994 the location of Kennewick School District 17's administration.

For 64 years until the founding of Kamiakin High School, Kennewick High School served as the sole high school in the city. Its colors are orange and black, and its mascot is a lion. Football and soccer games are played at Neil F. Lampson Stadium, which is located on the high school's grounds and is shared by both Kamiakin and Southridge High School.

== Athletics ==
Recently, because of a change in enrollment accounting by the Washington Interscholastic Activities Association, Kennewick High, along with Southridge, was reclassified as a 3A school. As a result, the Columbia Basin Big 9 Conference (which consisted of 11 schools), was reconfigured into the Mid Columbia Conference. The new conference now consists of 8 schools; four 3A and four 4A. Kennewick High is in the 3A division, along with Southridge and Hanford High School. The 4A division consists of Kamiakin, Richland High School, Pasco High School, Walla Walla High School, and Chiawana High School. Kennewick High School has a traditional rivalry with Kamiakin High School, however in recent years both schools have become bigger rivals with Southridge High School than with each other.

Neil F Lampson Stadium, their home football stadium, has a capacity of 6,800 for football games.

=== State championships ===
- Baseball: 2008
- Girls basketball: 2000
- Boys cross country: 1978, 1979, 1980
- Boys gymnastics: 1969
- Boys wrestling: 1970, 1971, 1982

== Notable alumni ==
- Adam Carriker, NFL player for the Washington Redskins, former player for the Nebraska Cornhuskers
- Geraldine Dawson, William Cleland Distinguished Professor, Professor in Psychiatry and Behavioral Sciences, Professor of Psychology and Neuroscience, Professor in Pediatrics. Affiliate, Duke Global Health Institute, Affiliate of the Center for Child and Family Policy
- David A. Swanson. Distinguished Professor Emeritus, University of California Riverside, recognized as one of the world's leading demographers; recipient of numerous awards (e.g., Dickson, Fulbright, Sheps, Terrie); inducted member, Sigma Xi Honorary Scientific Research Society; member of the Washington State Academy of Sciences; author/co-author of more than 140 refereed journal articles, 11 books, and editor/co-editor of five books.
- Daniel Dickinson, NCAA Men's Baseball College World Series Winner with LSU in 2025, drafted in the 6th round of the 2025 MLB draft to the Milwaukee Brewers.
- Michael Farris, founder and Chancellor of Patrick Henry College, founder and chairman of the Homeschool Legal Defense Association, constitutional lawyer
- Ray Mansfield, 2x Super Bowl winner for the Pittsburgh Steelers, former Hall of Fame player for the Washington Huskies
- Leilani Mitchell, WNBA player on the Washington Mystics
- Travis Nelson (politician), Oregon State Representative for Oregon's 44th House district
- Russ Swan, Former MLB player (San Francisco Giants, Seattle Mariners, Cleveland Indians)
