= Chinook Middle School =

Chinook Middle School can mean one of four schools in the US state of Washington:

- Chinook Middle School in Bellevue, Washington, part of the Bellevue School District
- Chinook Middle School in Burien, Washington, part of the Highline School District
- Chinook Middle School in Kennewick, Washington, part of the Kennewick School District
- Chinook Middle School in Lacey, Washington, part of the North Thurston School District
