= Roy Williams (defensive tackle) =

American football player (born 1937)

No. 66
- Position: Defensive tackle

Personal information
- Born: April 30, 1937; Moorhead, Minnesota, U.S.
- Died: September 6, 2017 (aged 80); San Clemente, California, U.S.
- Listed height: 6 ft 7 in (2.01 m)
- Listed weight: 265 lb (120 kg)

Career information
- High school: Pasco (Pasco, Washington)
- College: Pacific
- NFL draft: 1963: 2nd round, 27th overall pick
- AFL draft: 1963: 4th round, 26th overall pick

Career history
- Detroit Lions (1963)*; San Francisco 49ers (1963)
- * Offseason or practice squad member only
- Stats at Pro Football Reference

Roy Orville Williams (April 30, 1937 – September 6, 2017) is an American former professional football defensive tackle who played one season with the San Francisco 49ers of the National Football League (NFL). He was selected by the Detroit Lions in the second round of the 1963 NFL draft after playing college football at the University of the Pacific.

== Early life ==
Roy Orville Williams was born on April 30, 1937, in Moorhead, Minnesota. He attended Pasco High School in Pasco, Washington.

== College career ==
Williams joined the United States Navy after high school. After his honorable discharge from the Navy, he enrolled at the University of the Pacific. He played college football for the Pacific Tigers. He was a member of the football team from 1959 to 1962 and a two-year letterman from 1961 to 1962. Williams also participated in track in college. He was invited to play in the Chicago Charities College All-Star Game after his senior year. He graduated from Pacific with a degree in speech pathology in 1963. Williams was inducted into the school's athletics hall of fame in 2008.

== Professional career ==
Williams was selected by the San Diego Chargers in the fourth round, with the 26th overall pick, of the 1963 AFL draft and by the Detroit Lions in the second round, with the 27th overall pick, of the 1963 NFL draft. He chose to sign with the Lions. He was released on September 3, 1963.

Williams signed with the San Francisco 49ers of the NFL on October 30, 1963. He played in seven games for the 49ers during the 1963 season. He was released on August 24, 1964.

== Personal life ==
Williams' son Eric Williams and grandson Kyle Williams both played in the NFL. Roy wrote five books on wealth transfer. He was awarded a doctorate by the California School of Professional Psychology. In 1995, he spoke at the House of Lords in London. Williams died on September 6, 2017, in San Clemente, California.
