= Sean O'Malley =

Sean or Shawn O'Malley may refer to:

- Seán Patrick O'Malley (born 1944), American Catholic Archbishop of Boston and cardinal
- Sean O'Malley (fighter) (born 1994), American mixed martial artist
- Shawn O'Malley, baseball player
