= Edwin Markham Elementary School =

Edwin Markham Elementary School may refer to one of several schools named after Edwin Markham, including schools in:

- Hayward Unified School District, California
- Mt. Lebanon School District, Pennsylvania
- Pasco School District (Washington)
- Vacaville, California
