= Oelhoffen =

Oelhoffen is a surname. Notable people with the surname include:

- David Oelhoffen (born 1968), French director and screenwriter
- Kimo von Oelhoffen (born 1971), American football defensive tackle
- Talia von Oelhoffen (born 2002), American basketball player
