= Talia von Oelhoffen =

American basketball player (born 2002)

No. 55 – USC Trojans
- Position: Point guard / shooting guard
- League: Big Ten Conference

Personal information
- Born: October 7, 2002 (age 24) Pittsburgh, Pennsylvania, U.S.
- Listed height: 5 ft 11 in (1.80 m)

Career information
- High school: Tri-Cities Prep (Pasco, Washington); Chiawana (Pasco, Washington)
- College: Oregon State (2020–2024); USC (2024–2025)

Career highlights
- 2× All-Pac-12 Team (2022, 2024)

Talia Kilyn Olanialiʻi von Oelhoffen (born October 7, 2002) is an American college basketball player who previously played for the USC Trojans of the Big Ten Conference and the Oregon State Beavers.

== High school career ==
Von Oelhoffen played basketball for Tri-Cities Prep in Pasco, Washington in her first two seasons, leading her team to the Class 2B state championship as a sophomore. For her junior season, she transferred to Chiawana High School in Pasco, where she helped her team reach the Class 4A state tournament despite suffering from mononucleosis. Von Oelhoffen graduated one semester early from high school, opting out of her senior season amid COVID-19 restrictions to begin her college career. Rated a four-star recruit by ESPN, she committed to play college basketball for Oregon State over offers from Stanford, UCLA, UConn, and Oklahoma.

== College career ==
As a freshman at Oregon State, von Oelhoffen averaged 11.3 points, 3.8 rebounds, and 3.0 assists per game, earning Pac-12 All-Freshman honorable mention. In her sophomore season, she averaged 13.7 points, 3.9 rebounds, and 3.0 assists per game, and was named to the All-Pac-12 Team. On December 17, 2022, von Oelhoffen scored a career-high 41 points, 6 assists, and 5 rebounds in a 96–84 win over Nevada. She had the most single-game points by an Oregon State player since Talisa Rhea in 2008. Her junior season was cut short by a lingering injury in February 2023, and she averaged 13.2 points, 5.0 rebounds, and 3.3 assists per game en route to All-Pac-12 honorable mention. As a senior, von Oelhoffen averaged 10.7 points, 5.0 assists, and 4.1 rebounds per game, helping Oregon State reach the Elite Eight of the 2024 NCAA tournament. She received her second All-Pac-12 selection.

For her fifth season, von Oelhoffen transferred to USC.

== Personal life ==
Von Oelhoffen's father, Kimo, is a former defensive tackle in the National Football League. Her mother, Tondi, played college basketball for Hawaii. She is of Hawaiian descent.

== Career statistics ==
=== College ===
Legend
GP	Games played	GS	Games started	MPG	Minutes per game	RPG	Rebounds per game
APG	Assists per game	SPG	Steals per game	BPG	Blocks per game	PPG	Points per game
TO	Turnovers per game	FG%	Field-goal percentage	3P%	3-point field-goal percentage	FT%	Free-throw percentage
**Bold**	Career best	°	League leader

Year	Team	GP	GS	MPG	FG%	3P%	FT%	RPG	APG	SPG	BPG	TO	PPG
2020–21	Oregon State	13	0	24.3	**44.0**	**43.4**	81.5	3.8	3.0	0.8	0.2	2.4	11.3
2021–22	Oregon State	31	31	27.5	40.3	36.2	88.8	3.9	3.0	0.9	0.5	2.9	**13.7**
2022–23	Oregon State	26	24	**30.5**	36.4	29.8	84.2	**5.0**	3.3	1.2	**0.7**	2.3	13.2
2023–24	Oregon State	**35**	**35**	27.0	38.7	31.7	**88.9**	4.1	**5.0**	1.0	**0.7**	2.3	10.7
2024–25	USC	34	34	23.9	36.2	27.6	80.6	2.5	3.3	**1.3**	0.5	**2.0**	5.9
**Career**		139	124	26.7	38.7	32.6	86.3	3.8	3.6	1.1	0.6	2.4	10.7
Statistics retrieved from Sports-Reference.
