= Delta High School (Washington) =

Location
- 5801 Broadmoor Blvd; Pasco, Washington 99301; United States; 46°16′50″N 119°13′13″W

Information
- Type: Public
- Established: September 15, 2015
- School district: Pasco School District
- Principal: KC Bennion
- Enrollment: 401 (approximately)
- Website: School webpage

Delta High School (or DHS) is a high school in Pasco, Washington, United States. It provides a STEM-based curriculum for students in grades 9-12 from three school districts in the Tri-Cities area. The school is operated as a collaborative effort by the Kennewick School District, Pasco School District, and Richland School District, and in partnerships with a local skill center, colleges, and businesses. The school has been designated by the State of Washington as an Existing Innovative School.

== History and facilities ==
Delta High School opened on September 15, 2015 Each school district is allocated approximately 1/3 of the enrollment for its students. Approximately 40 percent of the first year's 100 enrollees left the school, mostly in the first year, reportedly due to frustration with the start-up of the new school and the rigorous program. The first graduating class was in the spring of 2013 when 62 students graduated. Through the 2014–2015 school year, the school operated in a group of buildings owned by Columbia Basin College in Pasco, Washington. After a years long effort to locate and build a new permanent campus, a site was located and construction of new permanent facilities were completed for the start of the 2015–2016 school year in Pasco, Washington. The new campus was officially dedicated on October 8, 2015, on 5801 Broadmoor Blvd.

== Community partners ==
In addition to the three public school districts, the school partners with Columbia Basin College, Washington State University - Tri-Cities, Central Washington University, Eastern Washington University, Washington State STEM Education Foundation, and Battelle Memorial Institute.
