= Aaron Neary =

American football player (born 1992)

No. 72
- Position: Center

Personal information
- Born: November 15, 1992 (age 34); Richland, Washington, U.S.
- Listed height: 6 ft 4 in (1.93 m)
- Listed weight: 301 lb (137 kg)

Career information
- High school: Hanford (Richland)
- College: Eastern Washington
- NFL draft: 2016: undrafted

Career history
- Denver Broncos (2016)*; Philadelphia Eagles (2016–2017)*; Los Angeles Rams (2017); Cleveland Browns (2018)*; Los Angeles Rams (2018–2019)*; Chicago Bears (2020); San Francisco 49ers (2020)*
- * Offseason or practice squad member only

Awards and highlights
- 2× First-team All-Big Sky (2014–15); Second-team FCS All-American (AP) (2015)

Career NFL statistics
- Games played: 1
- Games started: 1
- Stats at Pro Football Reference

Aaron Neary (born November 15, 1992) is an American former professional football player who was a center in the National Football League (NFL). He played college football for the Eastern Washington Eagles.

== College career ==
Neary attended and played college football at Eastern Washington University.

== Professional career ==
=== Denver Broncos ===
Neary was signed by the Denver Broncos as an undrafted free agent on May 2, 2016. He was waived on September 3, 2016.

=== Philadelphia Eagles ===
On September 5, 2016, Neary was signed to the Philadelphia Eagles' practice squad. He signed a reserve/future contract with the Eagles on January 2, 2017. He was waived by the team on September 2, 2017.

=== Los Angeles Rams ===
On September 3, 2017, Neary was claimed off waivers by the Los Angeles Rams. He was waived by the team on September 16, 2017, and re-signed to the practice squad. He was promoted to the active roster on December 27, 2017. He made his NFL debut in Week 17 against the San Francisco 49ers, earning the start at center as the Rams rested many of their starters, including starting center John Sullivan.

On August 31, 2018, Neary was waived by the Rams.

=== Cleveland Browns ===
On September 2, 2018, Neary was claimed off waivers by the Cleveland Browns. He was waived on September 6, 2018.

=== Los Angeles Rams (second stint) ===
On September 11, 2018, Neary was signed to the Los Angeles Rams' practice squad. He signed a reserve/future contract with the Rams on February 8, 2019.

Neary was suspended the first four games of the 2019 season for a violation of the league's substance abuse policy. He suffered a broken ankle in the preseason and was ruled out for the year. He was placed on the reserve/suspended list on August 31, 2019. He was waived from the reserve/suspended list with an injury settlement on September 10. He was reinstated from suspension by the NFL on October 1, 2019, while still a free agent.

=== Chicago Bears ===
On November 3, 2020, Neary was signed to the Chicago Bears practice squad. He was elevated to the active roster on November 8 for the team's week 9 game against the Tennessee Titans, and reverted to the practice squad after the game. He was released on November 10.

=== San Francisco 49ers ===
On December 16, 2020, Neary was signed to the San Francisco 49ers' practice squad. He was released on January 2, 2021.

== Personal life ==
On September 16, 2018, Neary was arrested for misdemeanor DUI and hit and run by the Simi Valley Police Department.
