= Hodgin =

Hodgin may refer to:

== People ==
- Emily Caroline Chandler Hodgin (1838-1907), American temperance reformer
- Ralph Hodgin (1915-2011), American baseball player
- Steve Hodgin (born c. 1951), former American football player and coach

== Other ==
- Hodgin Hall, historic building on the University of New Mexico, US

== See also ==
- Hodgins
