= Southridge High School (Kennewick) =

Coordinates: 46°10′45″N 119°11′42″W

Location
- 3320 Southridge Blvd; Kennewick, Washington 99338

Information
- Type: Public
- Established: 1996
- Principal: John Griffith
- Teaching staff: 69.10 (FTE)
- Enrollment: 1,643 (2023-2024)
- Student to teacher ratio: 23.78
- Colors: Navy and gold
- Team name: Suns
- Rivals: Kennewick Lions, Kamiakin Braves
- Website: southridge.ksd.org

Southridge High School is a public high school located in the city of Kennewick, Washington, United States (in Benton County). The school is part of Kennewick School District.

== History ==
Construction of the $30 million building began in 1995, with classroom doors opening in the spring of 1997. The plans for Southridge High School were originally designed for a high school on the east side of the country; however, the school was never built and the Kennewick School District purchased the blueprints and plans. During construction, classes were held at Fruitland Elementary School, under the direction of Principal Ron Williamson. The first commencement was held inside the Toyota Center in June 1999. Southridge was the third 4A school constructed in Kennewick, but with the reorganization of leagues in 2006, Southridge became a 3A school and is now a member of the Columbia Basin League. Yet again, in 2008, it was decided that Southridge would be put back under the 4A schools along with 2 other high schools in Kennewick, WA. In 2010 Southridge returned to the 3A designation.

== Facilities ==
The 50-acre (200,000 m^{2}) campus lies within a valley on the southwest border of Kennewick.

The school's main complex, divided into wings A through G, was designed by the architecture firm Hammel, Green and Abrahamson of Minnesota; Joe Lavernier Construction of Spokane was the general contractor. The wings are all connected by a long crescent-shaped hall with A and F-wing at the north and south ends, respectively. The E-wing is in the inner curve, wings B, C and D branch off along the outer curve and all connect to G-wing upstairs.

The school grounds include football and baseball fields, an outdoor basketball court as well as softball fields, a track, several soccer fields, eight tennis courts, and 2 courtyards made at the time G-wing was added. The school uses the Kennewick Public Pool as it does not have one of its own.

== Athletics ==
Southridge participates in the Columbia Basin Big Nine (CBBN) 3A. The CBBN is the former Columbia Basin League which is the former Big Nine. Football and soccer games are played at Neil F. Lampson Stadium, which is located on the grounds of Kennewick High School. Southridge shares the stadium with Kennewick and Kamiakin High School. In their brief existence, the Suns have won state championships in dance for four years (2004–2008), golf, soccer, and baseball, along with several individual state championships in tennis, gymnastics, Swimming, diving, ice hockey, and wrestling. Southridge’s competitive cheerleading team qualified for state in 2023.

== Notable alumni ==
- Shawn O'Malley, infielder, Seattle Mariners
- Mason Martin, Professional baseball player
