= Joseph Santos =

American painter

Joseph Santos (born 1965) is a contemporary American (European and Filipino descent) artist/watercolorist. He is known for his watercolor paintings of urban and industrial objects. His work has garnered many awards nationally, including the Paul B. Remmey award at the prestigious American Watercolor Society 138th international exhibition in New York City. His paintings have been exhibited in museums throughout the United States, including the Elmhurst Art Museum in Illinois and the Springfield Art Museum in Missouri. His watercolor paintings have also been featured in national publications including Southwest Art, The Artist's magazine and American Art Collector

== Life ==
Joseph Santos was born in Los Angeles, California, where he lived until the age of five when his family moved to Eastern Washington. After graduating from Pasco High School (Pasco, Washington), Joseph attended Golden West College in Southern California (1984–1986) where he studied art technique and design while also working in his fathers art studio. He started working exclusively in watercolor in the late 1980s and in 1999 started to paint the steel and industrial subjects that he is known for. Inspired by the Precisionism art movement, Santos cites Charles Sheeler and Charles Demuth as influences.

== Important exhibitions ==
- Luster: Realism and Hyperrealism in Contemporary Automobile and Motorcycle Painting. National Traveling Museum Exhibition, 2018-2021
- Industrialism in the 21st Century: Nicole Longnecker Gallery, 2017
- Shenzhen International Watercolor Biennial Travel Show 2016
- Shenzhen International Watercolor Biennial Shenzhen Art Museum, Shenzhen, China. 2015
- Shenzhen International Watercolor Biennial Travel Show 2014
- Shenzhen International Watercolor Biennial, Shenzhen Art Museum, Shenzhen, China. 2013
- "Signage" new paintings by Joe Santos, Elliott Fouts Gallery March 2009
- American Watercolor Society 135th International Exhibition, New York City.
- American Watercolor Society 138th International Exhibition, New York City.
- American Watercolor Society Traveling Exhibition, 2008.
- American Watercolor Society Traveling Exhibition, 2005.
- National Watercolor Society 82nd National Exhibition, Southern California.
- Transparent Watercolor Society of America Annual National Exhibition. Elmhurst Art Museum, 2004.

== Awards ==
- 2005- Paul B. Remmey Award- American Watercolor Society Annual Juried Exhibition, New York, N.Y.

== Memberships ==
American Watercolor Society Signature member
