= Eric Williams (defensive lineman) =

American football player (born 1962)

No. 76, 75
- Positions: Defensive tackle, defensive end

Personal information
- Born: February 24, 1962 (age 64); Stockton, California, U.S.
- Listed height: 6 ft 4 in (1.93 m)
- Listed weight: 282 lb (128 kg)

Career information
- High school: St. Mary's (Stockton, California)
- College: Washington State
- NFL draft: 1984: 3rd round, 62nd overall pick

Career history
- Detroit Lions (1984–1989); Washington Redskins (1990–1993)

Awards and highlights
- Super Bowl champion (XXVI); First-team All-Pac-10 (1983)

Career NFL statistics
- Sacks: 30
- Fumble recoveries: 2
- Interceptions: 1
- Stats at Pro Football Reference

Eric Michael Williams (born February 24, 1962) is an American former professional football player who was a defensive lineman in the National Football League (NFL).

== Early life ==
Williams attended and played high school football at St. Mary's High School in Stockton, California.

== College career ==
Williams played college football at Washington State University and was voted All Pac-10.

== Professional career ==
Williams played for the Detroit Lions between 1984 and 1989 and the Washington Redskins between 1990 and 1993. He was selected in the third round of the 1984 NFL draft. Williams was a starting defensive tackle with the Redskins in 1991 that went 14-2 and won Super Bowl XXVI.

== After football ==
Williams served as founder and CEO of Applied Sports Technology, an online college athletic recruiting service.

== Personal life ==
His father Roy O. Williams also played in the NFL for the San Francisco 49ers while his nephew Kyle Williams was a standout for the USC Trojans before becoming a Seattle Seahawks offensive lineman.
