= KTCV =

- Kennewick, Washington; United States
- Frequency: 88.1 MHz

Programming
- Format: Alternative music

Ownership
- Owner: Kennewick School District No. 17

History
- First air date: September 21, 1984 (as KICV)
- Former call signs: KICV (1984–1985)

Technical information
- Licensing authority: FCC
- Facility ID: 34022
- Class: A
- ERP: 3,500 watts
- HAAT: -28 meters
- Transmitter coordinates: 46°13′9.00″N 119°12′1.00″W

Links
- Public license information: Public file; LMS

KTCV (88.1 FM) is a high school radio station broadcasting an alternative music music format. Licensed to Kennewick, Washington, United States, the radio station is currently owned by the Kennewick School District. It broadcasts from the Tri-Tech Skills Center in Kennewick, by students as part of extra classes for high schools in the Tri-Cities area.

== History ==
The station was founded in 1984 under the supervision of Marv Carstens at the Tri-Tech Skills Center, a vocational skills institute run by the Kennewick School District. KTCV operated under a heavy metal format with broadcasts from 6 a.m. to 8 p.m. on weekdays during the school year. The station did not resume following the 1988 summer break due to complaints from parents over its airing of heavy metal songs due to their content; a station advisory committee lobbied the Kennewick School Board to convert KTCV into a "top 100" station. It was reborn with a top-40 format; by 1989, it was broadcasting to an area as far north as Moses Lake and Basin City.

The station shifted away from the unpopular top 40 format and during class hours ran the classic rock format in the early 1990s. After class hours, students ran special programs from 3:00pm to 5:00pm sign off. Also during this time, as a test, Tri-Tech's administration allowed Friday night broadcasts until 10:00pm. The classic rock format was phased out after country KOTY 106.5 became KEGX 'The Eagle 106.5" in 1993 with its own classic rock format. KTCV then shifted to an alternative rock format in June 1993 under the slogan "88.1 The Alternative". That branding existed until the late 2000s with the station rebranding as "88.1 The Edge."

The station's license was challenged in 1996 by two outside groups who attempted to force a shared frequency agreement due to KTCV's restricted hours of operation. KTCV was shut down in December 1996 after it failed to meet a FCC deadline to install equipment for the new Emergency Alert System; it was restored in March 1997 after a system was purchased for $2,000 and installed. Additionally, the station's license accidentally expired during this era without a proper renewal forcing the station to go off the air. Through luck and immediate action, the FCC allowed the station an emergency renewal.

Local radio veteran Ed Dailey has taught the program since 1997. The station has broadcast 24/7 since the early 2000s with the addition of an automation system. Unlike the early days when KTCV always had a live DJ, today KTCV reflects the industry standard and operates primarily with automation and voice tracking.

== Coverage ==
KTCV has gone through various signal upgrades over the years. Originally, with an ERP of 320 watts that covered Kennewick well, but listeners in West Richland and especially Benton City had a difficult time receiving the station. Power was increased in the late 1990s to 1100 watts. Today, the current ERP of the station is 3500 watts and reaches most of the Tri-Cities area.

== Operations ==
The station operates as a learning tool for the students of the Radio Broadcasting program at the Tri-Tech Skills Center. First-year students learn about radio history, radio theory, public speaking, broadcast writing and various live audio applications. First-year students also read short newscasts on KTCV. Second-year students take a more active role in KTCV, including day-to-day operations and on-air announcing.

Unique to KTCV is the students' influence on the format and programming. KTCV is one of only a few high school stations in the state that the students take an active role in operations, programming and management.

In addition to students, an adult community radio class is offered. Attendees read news and voice track for KTCV in addition to learning radio broadcasting history and theory, news writing and proper announcing techniques.
