= Mid-Columbia Libraries =

Library system in Eastern Washington

- 46°12′13″N 119°9′33″W
- Location: Tri-Cities metropolitan area, Eastern Washington, U.S.
- Type: Public library
- Established: 1948
- Branches: 12

Collection
- Size: 566,758

Access and use
- Circulation: 2.4 million
- Population served: 270,125

Other information
- Website: midcolumbialibraries.org
- References: Washington Public Library Statistical Report, 2023

Mid-Columbia Libraries is a library system in Eastern Washington. There were 270,125 people in its service area in 2023, which spans the Tri-Cities metropolitan area except for Richland, which retains a city library: West Richland, Kennewick, and Pasco, and surrounding Benton, Franklin, and parts of Adams Counties are part of Mid-Columbia. It was founded in 1948, originally to serve patrons in unincorporated parts of the counties.

As of 2025, the cities of Kennewick, Benton City, Connell, Mesa, and Kahlotus have annexed into the district, while Pasco, West Richland, and Prosser have contracts with the district. In 2025, Mid-Columbia Libraries entered into a reciprocal borrowing agreement with the Richland Public Library, Walla Walla County Rural Library District, Walla Walla Public Library, and Columbia County Rural Library District.
