= Kyle Williams (offensive tackle) =

American football player (born 1984)

No. 78
- Position: Offensive tackle

Personal information
- Born: March 19, 1984 (age 42); Stockton, California, U.S.
- Listed height: 6 ft 6 in (1.98 m)
- Listed weight: 295 lb (134 kg)

Career information
- College: USC
- NFL draft: 2007: undrafted

Career history
- Seattle Seahawks (2007–2009)

Career NFL statistics
- Games played: 4
- Games started: 2
- Stats at Pro Football Reference

Kyle A. Williams (born March 19, 1984) is an American former professional football player who was an offensive tackle in the National Football League (NFL). He was signed by the Seattle Seahawks as an undrafted free agent in 2007. He played college football for the USC Trojans.

== Early life ==
Williams began his high school career at St. Mary's High School in Stockton, California, before transferring to Highland Park High School in Dallas, Texas. He was a member of the West Squad for the 2002 U.S. Army All-American Bowl.

== College career ==
Williams played college football at the University of Southern California. Williams was invited to play in the 2007 Texas vs. The Nation College All Star Game. He is currently one of only 4 offensive lineman in college football history to block for three Heisman Trophy winners, Carson Palmer, Matt Leinart and Reggie Bush.

== Professional career ==
Pre-draft measurables
Height	Weight	40-yard dash	10-yard split	20-yard split	20-yard shuttle	Three-cone drill	Vertical jump	Broad jump	Bench press
6 ft 5 7/8 in (1.98 m)	305 lb (138 kg)	5.46 s	1.78 s	3.09 s	4.90 s	8.17 s	26.0 in (0.66 m)	7 ft 10 in (2.39 m)	27 reps
All values from Pro Day

=== Seattle Seahawks ===
Williams signed with the National Football League's Seattle Seahawks in April, 2007.

== Personal ==
Williams is the nephew of former NFL defensive tackle Eric Williams. Additionally, his grandfather Roy O. Williams played for the San Francisco 49ers in 1963. His other grandfather, Rod Rojas, was a 3 sport lettermen for Lehigh University.
