= Mason Martin =

American baseball player (born 1999)

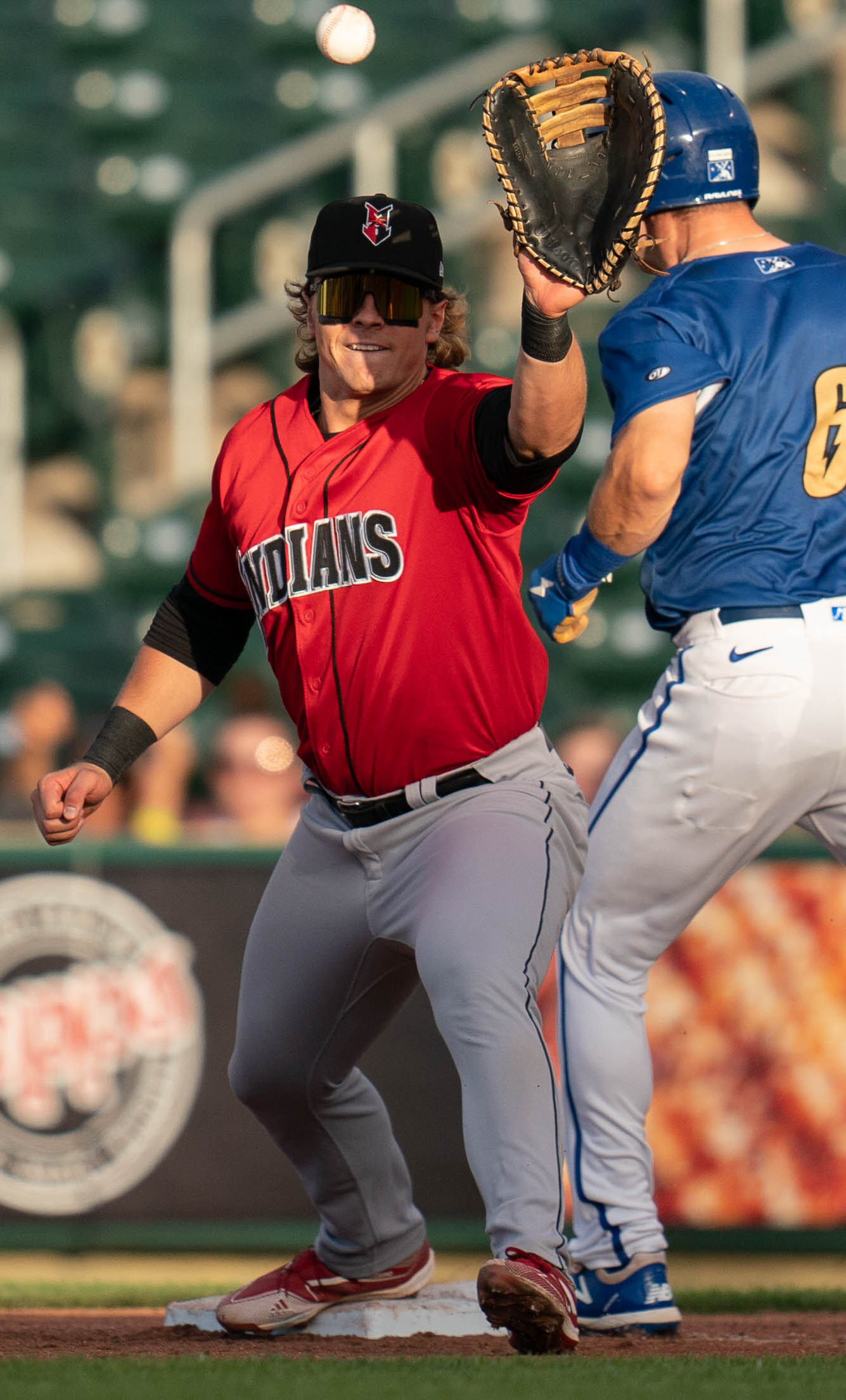
- Martin with the Indianapolis Indians in 2022

Lancaster Stormers
- First baseman
- Born: June 2, 1999 (age 27); Kennewick, Washington, U.S.
- Bats: Left Throws: Right
- Stats at Baseball Reference

Mason Neil Martin (born June 2, 1999) is an American professional baseball first baseman for the Lancaster Stormers of the Atlantic League of Professional Baseball.

== Amateur career ==
Martin attended Southridge High School in Kennewick, Washington, where he played football and baseball. In 2017, his senior year, he hit .507 with five home runs and ten stolen bases. After his senior year, he was drafted by the Pittsburgh Pirates in the 17th round of the 2017 Major League Baseball draft. He signed for a $350,000 signing bonus, forgoing his commitment to play college baseball at Gonzaga University.

== Professional career ==
=== Pittsburgh Pirates ===
After signing with the Pirates, Martin made his professional debut with the Rookie-level Gulf Coast League Pirates, slashing .307/.457/.630 with 11 home runs (breaking the GCL Pirates record) and 22 RBI over 39 games, earning the title of Gulf Coast League Most Valuable Player. Martin began the 2018 season with the West Virginia Power of the Single–A South Atlantic League, but was reassigned to the Bristol Pirates of the Rookie-level Appalachian League halfway through the year. Over 104 games between the two teams, he batted .220 with 14 home runs and 58 RBI. In 2019, he began the year with the Greensboro Grasshoppers of the Single–A South Atlantic League (with whom he was named an All-Star) before being promoted to the Bradenton Marauders of the High–A Florida State League in July, with whom he finished the season. Over 131 games, Martin slashed .254/.351/.558 with 35 home runs and 129 RBI. His 35 home runs were fourth in all of the minor leagues and his 129 RBI were first. Following the season's end, he was named Pittsburgh's Minor League Player of the Year.

Martin did not play in a game in 2020 due to the cancellation of the minor league season because of the COVID-19 pandemic. Martin was assigned to the Altoona Curve of the Double-A Northeast for the majority of the 2021 season, slashing .242/.318/.481 with 22 home runs, 75 RBI, and 29 doubles over 112 games. Following the end of Altoona's season in mid-September, he was promoted to the Indianapolis Indians of the Triple-A East, appearing in eight games in which he hit three home runs to end the year. Martin led all Pittsburgh minor leaguers in home runs (25) and runs batted in (81), while also striking out 171 times over 439 at-bats. He returned to the Indians for the 2022 season. Over 134 games, he slashed .210/.287/.410 with 19 home runs, 74 RBI, and 29 doubles with 194 strikeouts over 481 at-bats.

For the 2023 season, Martin played with Altoona and Indianapolis, batting .215 with 18 home runs and 54 RBI over 97 games. He elected free agency following the season on November 6, 2023.

=== Los Angeles Angels ===
On April 16, 2024, Martin signed with the York Revolution of the Atlantic League of Professional Baseball. However prior to the season on April 23, Martin's contract was purchased by the Los Angeles Angels. In 30 games for the High–A Tri-City Dust Devils, he batted .192/.313/.415 with five home runs and 14 RBI. On June 20, Martin was released by the Angels organization.

=== Lancaster Stormers ===
On June 29, 2024, Martin signed with the Lancaster Stormers of the Atlantic League of Professional Baseball. In 66 appearances for Lancaster, he slashed .318/.390/.697 with 27 home runs, 73 RBI, and eight stolen bases.

On April 4, 2025, Martin re-signed with the Stormers. On September 11, Martin hit his 34th home run of the season against the Hagerstown Flying Boxcars, tying a single-season franchise record. In 116 games he hit .291/.393/.589 with 36 home runs, 92 RBIs and 16 stolen bases. He became a free agent following the season.

=== Algodoneros de Unión Laguna ===
On March 9, 2026, Martin signed with the Algodoneros de Unión Laguna of the Mexican League. In 78 games he batted .268/.344/.511 with 18 home runs, 68 RBIs and 3 stolen bases.

=== Lancaster Stormers (second stint) ===
On August 18, 2026, Martin signed with the Lancaster Stormers of the Atlantic League of Professional Baseball.
