= Ron Howard (American football) =

American football player (born 1951)

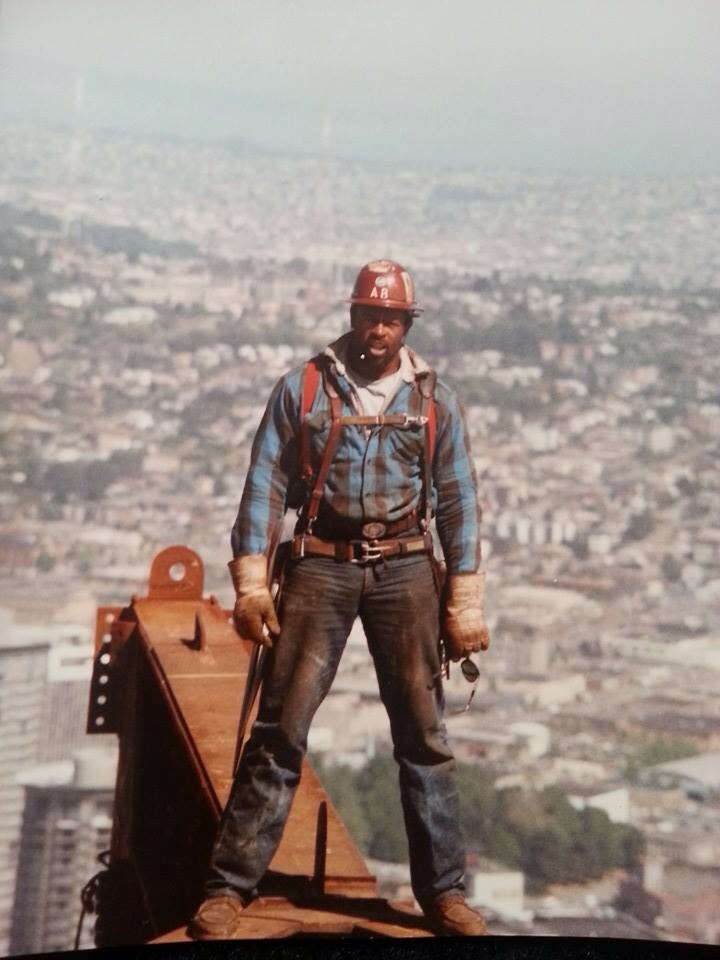
- Howard as an ironworker

No. 87, 85
- Position: Tight end

Personal information
- Born: March 3, 1951 (age 75); Oakland, California, U.S.
- Listed height: 6 ft 4 in (1.93 m)
- Listed weight: 229 lb (104 kg)

Career information
- High school: Pasco (WA)
- College: Seattle
- NFL draft: 1974: undrafted

Career history
- Dallas Cowboys (1974–1975); Seattle Seahawks (1976–1978); Buffalo Bills (1979)

Career NFL statistics
- Receptions: 72
- Receiving yards: 850
- Receiving TDs: 2
- Stats at Pro Football Reference

Ronald Ford Howard (born March 3, 1951) is an American former professional football player who was a tight end in the National Football League (NFL) for the Dallas Cowboys, Seattle Seahawks and Buffalo Bills. He played college basketball for the Seattle Chieftains (now Redhawks).

== Early life ==
Howard attended Pasco High School for three years. He played football, basketball, and track for Pasco High School. As a senior, Howard averaged 23.7 points per game while leading the basketball team to a 25–1 record, with its only loss coming in the state championship game to Snohomish High School, 53 to 51 in overtime. He was a high school All-American in basketball and All-conference in football as a tight end (he also played defensive back).

He accepted a basketball scholarship from Seattle University, where he was a two-year starter at forward. He finished his career averaging 9.2 points and 6.5 rebounds per game.

In 2006, he was inducted into the Washington Interscholastic Activities Association Hall of Fame.

== Professional career ==
=== Dallas Cowboys ===
Howard was a basketball player who had never played a down of college football, but he signed as an undrafted free agent in 1974 with the Dallas Cowboys, declining an offer to play professional basketball in France. Howard played primarily tight end, the position at which he had been an all-conference high school player, and his signing is considered a prime example of the innovative personnel decisions the Cowboys were renowned for at the time.

In his two years with the team he earned the nickname "Dr. W." for his hitting as the wedge buster in the special teams unit. In Super Bowl X, he played a quarter in place of injured starter Jean Fugett and also forced a fumble with a hit on Donnie Shell.

=== Seattle Seahawks ===
The Seattle Seahawks selected him from the Cowboys roster in the 1976 NFL expansion draft. He became the first starting tight end in franchise history, posting 37 receptions (second on the team) for 422 yards (third on the team).

His 37 receptions in 1976 was a team record for tight ends that lasted 26 years until it was broken by Itula Mili in 2002. He played three seasons for the Seahawks, before plantar fasciitis in both feet limited his production and was eventually waived on August 9, 1979. He finished with 72 receptions for 850 yards and 2 touchdowns.

=== Buffalo Bills ===
In 1979, he signed with the Buffalo Bills, but only played in one game. He was released in 1980.

== Personal life ==
Howard spent ten years as an ironworker in skyscraper construction. During this time, he helped build the Columbia Tower, the tallest building in Seattle. He once was a student teacher and gym class instructor at South Shore Middle School in Seattle. He currently works at Aki Kurose Middle School Academy, also in Seattle, as its assistant principal.
