= Shawn O'Malley =

American baseball player and coach (born 1987)

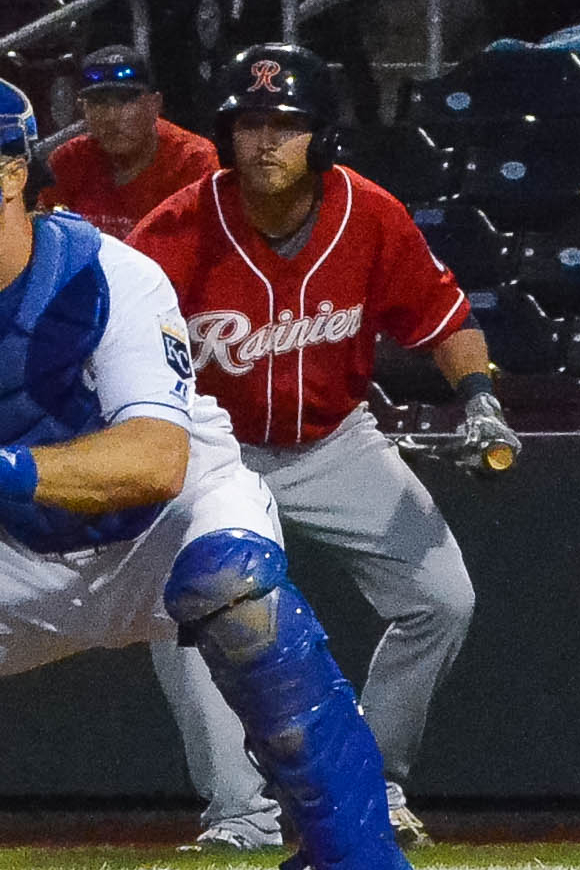
- O'Malley with the Tacoma Rainiers in 2015

Washington Nationals – No. 67
- Utility player / Hitting coach
- Born: December 28, 1987 (age 38); Richland, Washington, U.S.
- Batted: Switch Threw: Right

MLB debut
- September 7, 2014, for the Los Angeles Angels of Anaheim

Last MLB appearance
- October 2, 2016, for the Seattle Mariners

MLB statistics
- Batting average: .231
- Home runs: 3
- Runs batted in: 25
- Stats at Baseball Reference

Teams
- As player: Los Angeles Angels of Anaheim (2014); Seattle Mariners (2015–2016); As coach: Washington Nationals (2026–present)

Shawn Michael O'Malley (born December 28, 1987) is an American former professional baseball utility player and current assistant hitting coach for the Washington Nationals of Major League Baseball (MLB). He played in MLB for the Los Angeles Angels of Anaheim and Seattle Mariners.

== Playing career ==
=== High school ===
O'Malley helped lead Southridge High School to the 2003-2004 Washington State 4A Baseball Title. O'Malley received all-state honors in football and baseball. He committed to play baseball at Washington State University.

=== Tampa Bay Rays ===
O'Malley was drafted by the Tampa Bay Devil Rays in the fifth round of the 2006 Major League Baseball draft (139th overall) out of Southridge High School in Kennewick, Washington. He played in the Devil Rays/Rays organization until 2013 without reaching the majors.

=== Los Angeles Angels of Anaheim ===
On December 18, 2013, O'Malley signed a minor league deal with the Los Angeles Angels of Anaheim organization.

O'Malley was called up to the majors for the first time on September 1, 2014. He made his major league debut on September 7, when he pinch-hit for Albert Pujols at Minnesota against Twins pitcher Ryan Pressly, reaching on an infield hit to shortstop which drove in a run. O'Malley made 11 appearances for Los Angeles during his rookie campaign, going 3-for-16 (.188) with one RBI and two stolen bases. O'Malley was released by the Angels on December 19.

=== Seattle Mariners ===
On January 22, 2015, O'Malley was signed by the Seattle Mariners to a minor league contract with an invite to Major League spring training. While batting .345 at Triple-A with the Tacoma Rainiers, he was hindered from getting promoted due to a wrist injury, until rosters expanded. The Mariners promoted him to the major leagues on September 1.

In his first game with the Mariners, he went 3 for 4 with three singles, two RBI, and a stolen base in an 8-3 win over the Houston Astros. O'Malley finished the 2015 season batting .262 with Seattle.

Despite a very successful Spring Training, batting .471 (16-for-34) in 21 games, O'Malley was optioned to Triple-A Tacoma to begin the 2016 season. O'Malley was recalled by the Mariners on May 15, 2016, after batting .317 in 25 games with the Tacoma Rainiers.

On June 2, 2016, O'Malley played a vital role in the Mariners biggest comeback in club history. He drove in the game winning run with an RBI single. He missed the entire 2017 season due to injury. He elected free agency following the season on November 6, 2017.

=== Colorado Rockies ===
On December 16, 2017, O'Malley signed a minor league contract with the Colorado Rockies. In 55 games for the Triple–A Albuquerque Isotopes, he batted .279/.321/.367 with one home run and 16 RBI. O'Malley elected free agency following the season on November 2.

=== Kansas City T-Bones ===
On February 27, 2019, O'Malley signed with the Kansas City T-Bones of the American Association of Independent Professional Baseball. In 83 appearances for the T-Bones he hit .307/.378/.429 with 5 home runs, 40 RBI, and 10 stolen bases. O'Malley retired from professional baseball following the season.

== Coaching career ==
O'Malley was announced as hitting coach for the Modesto Nuts, the High–A affiliate of the Seattle Mariners, for the 2020 season. He was promoted to be the hitting coach of the Double-A affiliate Arkansas Travelers for 2023.

On January 24, 2024, O'Malley was announced as the hitting coach of the Triple–A Tacoma Rainiers.

O'Malley was named an assistant hitting coach on the staff of first-year Washington Nationals manager Blake Butera ahead of the 2026 season.

== Awards ==
- Florida State League Player of the Week (July 20–26, 2009)
- Florida State League Post-Season All-Star (2009)
- Pacific Coast League All-Star (2014)
- MiLB.com Organization All-Star (2014)
