= Tri-Cities Prep (Pasco, Washington) =

Location
- 9612 St. Thomas Drive; Pasco, (Franklin County), Washington 99301; United States; 46°16′21″N 119°12′58″W

Information
- Type: Private, Coeducational
- Religious affiliation: Roman Catholic
- Established: 1998
- President: Scott McNamee
- Grades: 9–12
- Colors: Navy Blue & Gold
- Slogan: Character ∙ Competence ∙ Compassion
- Athletics conference: Eastern Washington Athletic Conference (EWAC)
- Mascot: Jaguars
- Dean of Student Formation: Matthew Potter
- Academic Dean: Heather Axel
- Athletic Director: Kyle Cairns
- Website: www.tcprep.org

Tri-Cities Prep, a Catholic High School is a private, Roman Catholic high school in Pasco, Washington. It is located in the Roman Catholic Diocese of Spokane.

== Background ==
Tri-Cities Prep was established in 1998 and is located in the Tri Cities area of Washington. Pasco is located in the Roman Catholic Diocese of Spokane, while Kennewick and Richland are in the Roman Catholic Diocese of Yakima.

== Athletics ==
Tri-Cities Prep is a member of the Eastern Washington Athletic Conference (EWAC). It competes at the 2B level in the WIAA. The school offers 11 sports: volleyball, football, and men's and women's cross-country in the fall; men's and women's basketball in the winter; and baseball, softball, and men's and women's golf in the spring.

State Appearances

Sport	Years
Boys' Cross-Country	2007 (8th), 2008 (9th), 2009 (5th), 2010 (1st), 2011 (1st), 2012 (1st), 2013 (4th)
Football	2006, 2007, 2008, 2009 (1st), 2025 (1st)
Boys' Basketball	2007 (4th), 2009 (1st)
Girls' Basketball	2018 (8th), 2019 (1st), 2020 (6th)
Boys' Golf	2003 (3rd), 2004, 2008, 2009, 2010
Baseball	2017 (2nd), 2018 (1st), 2023 (1st), 2024 (1st), 2025 (1st)
Girls' Golf	2008, 2009 (3rd)
Wrestling	2013 John Hylden 2nd
