= Karen Murray-Hodgins =

American basketball player

Karen Murray-Hodgins is a basketball player.

She graduated from Pasco High in 1980. To this day, she is still the record-holder for the most career points (1,338) among female basketball players for the Bulldogs.

Murray played four seasons for the University of Washington where she finished third in career scoring with 1,745 points. She holds the University of Washington individual career highest field goal percentage at .541 (734 out of 1,365 attempts) and holds the season record for free throws made at .848 (89 out of 105 attempts). Murray also shares the career record for most free throws made with 269. In 1992, Murray was the first female basketball player to be inducted into the University of Washington Hall of Fame. Murray was also the first basketball player from central Washington State inducted into the Tri-Cities Sports Council Hall of Fame in 1999.

During the 1980s and early 1990s, pro basketball was available to women in Europe where Murray played with various teams for several years. She currently assists the girls' basketball program at Pasco High and works with her husband Mike assisting younger players in developing their skills.
