= Charlie Hodgins =

- Born: Charles H. Hodgins circa 1880

Rugby union career
- Position: fly-half
International career
Years	Team	Apps	(Points)
1910	Wallabies	3	(3)

Charles H. Hodgins (born circa 1880) was a rugby union player who represented Australia.

Hodgins, a fly-half, claimed a total of 3 international rugby caps for Australia.
