= Pasco High School (Washington) =

Location
- 1108 N. 10th Ave. Pasco, Washington 99301; United States; 46°14′18.65″N 119°6′11.1″W

Information
- Type: Public High School
- School district: Pasco School District
- Principal: Veronica Machado
- Teaching staff: 127.98 (FTE)
- Grades: 9–12
- Enrollment: 2,515 (2023–2024)
- Student to teacher ratio: 19.65
- Colors: Purple and White
- Mascot: Bulldog
- Newspaper: Wasco
- Yearbook: Sineweshah
- Website: Pasco High School

Pasco High School is a 9–12 public high school in Pasco, Washington. It was the only high school in Pasco until 2009, when Chiawana High School was opened.

In 2006, Pasco voters approved a $90 million+ bond to construct a new high school on Argent and Road 84 to ease the overcrowding of Pasco High. The new Chiawana High School opened in fall of 2009 along Argent Road. During the time of construction, Pasco High turned Captain Gray STEM Elementary School into an annex, where a majority of freshman classes were held. Once Chiawana High opened, the building once again became Captain Gray Elementary. Additionally, the school makes use of over 50 portable classrooms.

Pasco High is one of Washington state's largest high schools; it is classified as a 4A school (the classification for the largest schools in that state) with an enrollment of more than 1,800 students.

== Academics ==
Pasco High School has programs to train students in various occupational areas. One of these is the "Bulldog House" where students help build a house in the community and sell it, with the proceeds going towards next year's house and various scholarships. The Running Start program is offered by the school with the chance for dual enrollment open for students at Columbia Basin College, Washington State University Tri-Cities, and technical training offered at the Tri-Tech Skill Center.

The school manages a Hispanic Academic Achievers Program (HAAP), where students and families are recognized annually for the student maintaining a 3.0 or greater GPA. Senior HAAP members also apply for substantial scholarships to college and act as role models to younger siblings making it possible for the next generation to be more competitive in the United States.

Pasco made the Newsweek annual "Best American High Schools" list four times. This list includes the top 6% of schools in the nation. The schools are ranked according to the Challenge Index. Pasco High School placed in 2004, 2005, 2007, and 2009.

== Athletics ==
Pasco High School's mascots are the Bulldogs. The school has a rivalry with the Chiawana High Riverhawks. The rivalry started in early 2010.

Pasco High School has won seven state championships and have placed second in state championships 10 times. They have made it to the final state championship games 17 times.

The Pasco High School Boys Soccer Team has won two state championships in 1999 and 2007. The team has been ranked as high as third in the nation (1999) and fourth in 2007. They have made the playoffs for 14 straight years. In 2009 they were set to be first in the nation but lost the State Championship game 1-2 and dropped to 15th in the nation. The boys' basketball team won a state title in 1947.

The dance team's hip hop squad have been district champions for every year since the team was established. The team placed third in state for hip hop for six years straight. In 2011, the Show team were WIAA 3A state champions. They were 2014 state champions in both hip hop and show, defeating the defending hip hop state champions, Todd Beamer High School. In more recent years, the dance team has won state three times consecutively. They placed 2nd in the nation at the Official HHI National Championships in 2023.

When fundraising for the Field of Pride for Edgar Brown Memorial Stadium, Nike released a limited-edition version of their Air brand shoes, called Nike Air Pasco.

== Performing arts ==
Pasco High School has three band groups for members of varying skill level. These include Concert Band, Symphonic Band, and Wind Ensemble. The groups all have a concert near the end of the trimester.

The Marching Band at Pasco High School is well accomplished. For a couple decades now, with a bit of variance, they have attended several marching band competitions. These can include Harvest Marching Band Festival in Yakima, Cavalcade of Bands in Kennewick, Puget Sound Festival of Bands in Everett, and Pacific Northwest Marching Band Championships in Spokane. In 2006, they won sweepstakes (sweeping every caption award) in both Everett and Yakima. In 2007, they won sweepstakes along with every caption award in their division in Yakima, and they won first in their division (third overall) in Spokane and first in their Division (second overall) in Wenatchee. In 2008, they received second in their division (third overall) at Spokane and fourth overall in Everett. While the COVID-19 pandemic halted many marching band activities all around the country in 2020 and 2021, the marching band continued on with what they called party band] a version of marching band. During the 2022 marching band season, they scored 5th in Kennewick and 3rd in Yakima overall. In 2023, they placed eighth in Kennewick and fourth in Yakima.

The school has three percussion classes, who practice their skills every single day and play along with the regular concert bands. The Percussion Ensemble 1, led by Taylor Edwards and Tanner Cornell, won 3rd place overall in the Large Percussion category at the 2023 Washington Music Educators Associatio State Solo and Ensemble Festival.

The Jazz bands have won superior ratings in their competitions with people going to state as part of solo and ensemble. They took first place at the CBC Jazz Unlimited festival and took second place at the Bellevue Jazz Festival in April 2009. The Pasco High School Jazz program has concerts every school trimester, usually at the end to showcase the hard work they have put into their music.

The Pasco High School Orchestras consist of three groups: Freshman Orchestra, String Orchestra, and Chamber Orchestra. They also have three concerts a year near the end of the trimester.

Other activities include the 10th Avenue Singers who took first place at the CBC Jazz Festival.

== Notable alumni ==
- Jeremy Bonderman, Detroit Tigers pitcher, the only player ever drafted as a junior in high school
- Tyler Brayton, Carolina Panthers defensive end
- Kathy Brock, journalist at WLS-TV
- Anthony Davis, Kansas City Chiefs linebacker
- Sebastian Gutierrez, San Francisco 49ers offensive tackle
- Michael Jackson, linebacker
- Keith A. Moore, nerdcore rapper
- Karen Murray-Hodgins, basketball player
- Ron Howard, football player
- Bruce Kison, baseball player
- Duke Washington, football
- Doc Hastings, United States congressman
- Joseph Santos, painter
- Nikki Torres, member of the Washington State Senate
- Raul Vijil, former Arena Football League wide receiver
- Roy Williams, NFL player
