= Chiawana High School =

Public school in Pasco, Washington, United States

Coordinates: 46.257°N 119.197°W

- 8125 W. Argent Rd. Pasco, Washington; United States

Information
- Type: Public, four-year
- Motto: See blue in all you do
- Established: 2009
- Principal: Jaime Morales
- Teaching staff: 151.34 (on an FTE basis)
- Grades: 9–12
- Enrollment: 3,163 (2023–2024)
- Student to teacher ratio: 20.90
- Colors: Blue & Silver
- Athletics: WIAA
- Athletics conference: Mid-Columbia Conference (4A)
- Mascot: Riverhawk
- Rival: Pasco
- Newspaper: The Current
- Yearbook: The Channel
- Elevation: 400 ft (120 m) AMSL
- Website: Chiawana High School

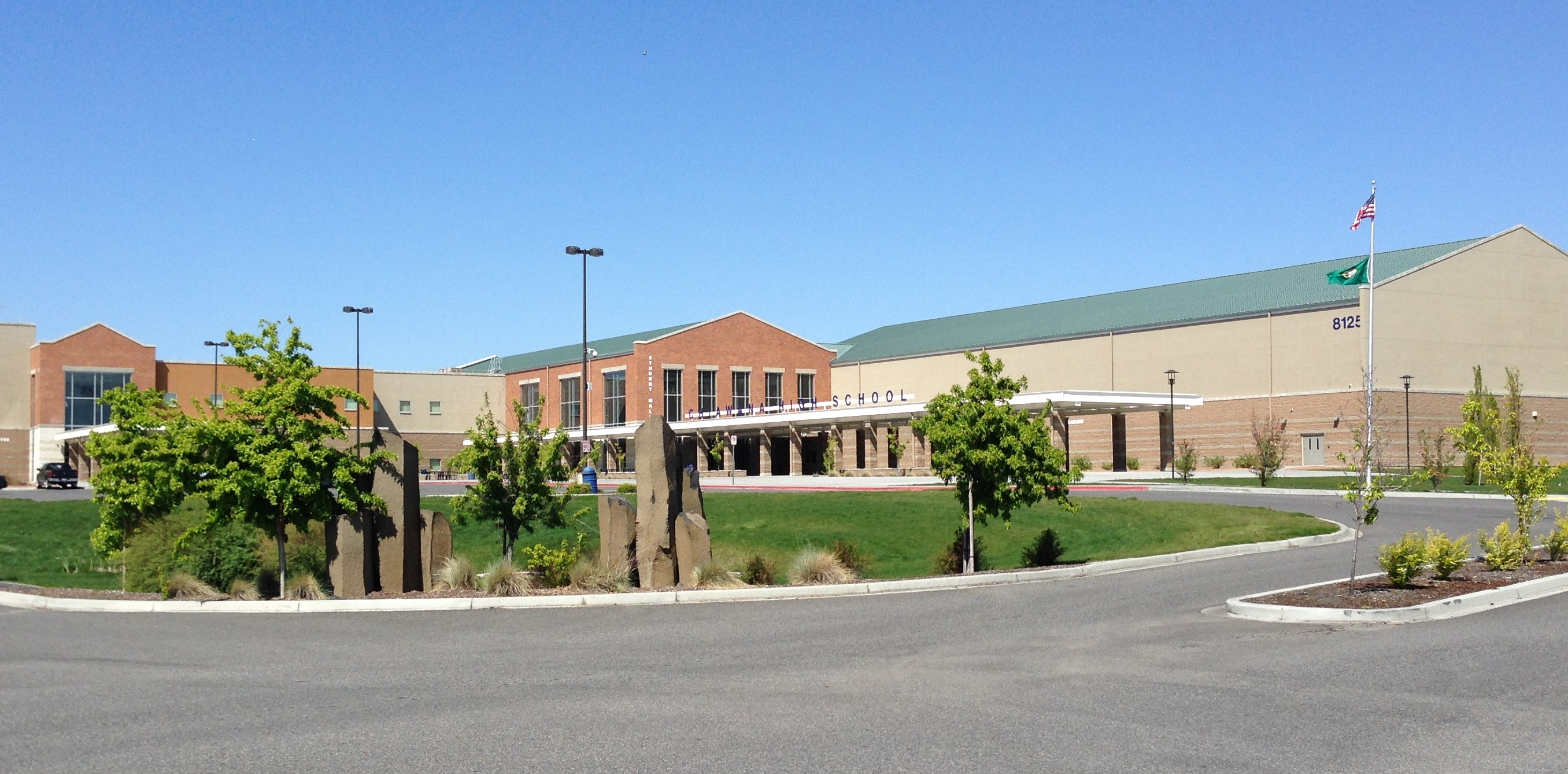
Chiawana High School 2015

Chiawana High School is a four-year public high school in Pasco, Washington, United States, the second traditional high school of Pasco School District #1. Opened in 2009 with 1600 students in grades 9, 10, and 11, CHS graduated its first senior class in 2011. The school colors are blue and silver and the mascot is a riverhawk.

== Features ==
Chiawana's campus features its own athletic facilities, which include a lighted football/soccer field surfaced with FieldTurf, negating the need to use Edgar Brown Memorial Stadium on the other end of town. The school's gymnasium was used by both Chiawana and Pasco High School for the 2009–2010 school year, as the main gymnasium at Pasco High had an unanticipated roof replacement.

The high school is the largest in Washington state, with an enrollment of 3,150 students in 2023–24; to accommodate the large student body, Chiawana had 16 portable buildings with 32 classrooms in addition to its main building, designed for up to 2,200 students. It was supplemented by Sageview High School, opened in August 2025, to ease crowding.

== Athletics ==
Chiawana competes in athletics in WIAA Class 4A in Greater Spokane/Mid-Columbia Conference District VIII, and are members of the Mid-Columbia Conference.

On December 7, 2013, Chiawana won their first state football title in school history. Led by former Pasco High School football coach Steve Graff, the Riverhawks defeated the Camas High School Papermakers at the Tacoma Dome 27–26 in a comeback victory. Chiawana, down 13 points with just under one minute remaining in the 4th quarter, scored 14 points in 55 seconds to secure the state title.

== Notable alumni ==
- Summer Yates (2018), NWSL soccer player
- Talia von Oelhoffen (2020), basketball player for the USC Trojans
