= Kennewick School District =

School district in Kennewick, Washington

Coordinates: 46°12′46″N 119°07′28″W

Location
- 1000 W 4th Ave, Kennewick, Washington 99336 United States

District information
- Type: Public
- Motto: To provide a safe environment in which all students reach their highest potential and graduate well prepared for success in post-secondary education, work and life.
- Grades: Pre-K through 12
- Superintendent: Lance Hansen
- NCES District ID: 5303930

Students and staff
- Students: 19,109
- Teachers: 1,141

Other information
- Website: www.ksd.org

Kennewick School District # 17 is the largest employer in the city of Kennewick, Washington. The school district runs 17 elementary schools, five middle schools, and seven high schools.

The school district's superintendent, Lance Hansen, has been serving since July 1, 2025.

== Schools ==
=== Elementary schools ===
- Amistad
- Amon Creek
- Canyon View
- Cascade
- Cottonwood
- Eastgate
- Edison
- Fuerza
- Hawthorne
- Lincoln
- Ridge View
- Sage Crest
- Southgate
- Sunset View
- Vista
- Washington
- Westgate

=== Middle schools ===
- Chinook
- Desert Hills
- Highlands
- Horse Heaven Hills
- Park

=== High schools ===
- Delta in Pasco (in partnership with the Pasco and Richland School Districts)
- Kamiakin in northwest Kennewick
- Kennewick in eastern Kennewick
- Southridge in southwest Kennewick
- Phoenix in eastern Kennewick.
- Legacy in western Kennewick
- Endeavor, an online school

=== Technical schools ===
- Tri-Tech Skills Center

=== Former schools ===
- Fruitland Elementary School

Fruitland Elementary is currently used and has been used for several years to temporarily house district programs and as a temporary home for other district schools under remodel.

== See also ==
- Neil F. Lampson Stadium
- KTCV
