= Pasco School District (Washington) =

Public school system in Washington, United States

Pasco School District No. 1

Address
- 1215 W. Lewis Street; Pasco, Washington United States
- Coordinates: 46°13′42″N 119°06′11″W

District information
- Type: Public
- Grades: K–12
- Established: January 10, 1885
- Superintendent: Michelle Whitney
- Schools: 27
- Budget: $313.5 million (2023–24)
- NCES District ID: 5306570

Students and staff
- Students: 18,515
- Teachers: 1,056
- Staff: 982

Other information
- Website: psd1.org

Pasco School District No. 1 (PSD) is a public school district in Pasco, Washington, United States, part of the Tri-Cities area. It serves over 18,500 K–12 students in the city of Pasco and surrounding parts of unincorporated Franklin County. As of 2025, the district operates 17 elementary schools, four middle schools, and five high schools.

Programs offered by PSD include the largest dual language program in Washington, serving over 2,190 students who are educated in both English and Spanish. The district launched a digital learning academy in 2023 that consolidates four online schools that offer remote learning to 600 students. The school district's superintendent has been Michelle Whitney since 2016.

== History ==
The Pasco School District No. 1 was formed on January 10, 1885, with one teacher and no permanent building. The first school in Pasco was constructed later in the year and was followed by a second schoolhouse in 1888. The school district was accredited by the Washington State Board of Education on June 7, 1910, and had 475 students at the time. The school district financed the creation of Columbia Basin College, a junior college to serve the Tri-Cities region, in 1955 with state approval. It continued to operate the college until 1967, when the state government reorganized community colleges into independent districts.

The school district underwent major growth in the early 21st century, particularly from immigration in the Hispanic American community. In 2007, superintendent Saundra Hill estimated that 65 percent of students lived in households that primarily spoke languages other than English. Pasco opened its second high school, Chiawana, at an 80-acre (32 ha) campus in August 2009 to address overcrowding at Pasco High School; within eight years, the newer high school had over 2,600 students and required the use of portable classrooms to accommodate its student body. A growth impact fee was approved by the Pasco city government in 2012 to fund capital projects, including the construction of five additional elementary schools, due to the city's population growth in the 2000s.

The school district opened its first STEM elementary school, named for Rosalind Franklin, in 2014; these schools have a curriculum focused on science, technology, engineering, and mathematics (STEM). An existing elementary school, Captain Gray, was converted into the district's third STEM school in 2015. One of the newest elementary schools in the district, Three Rivers, opened in 2019 with the first inclusive playground in Washington state; the playground features a greater variety of accessible equipment than a traditional school playground. The Pasco School District moved its sixth-grade classes from elementary schools to middle schools from 2015 to 2020 due to overcrowding that was later eased by the construction of Ray Reynolds Middle School.

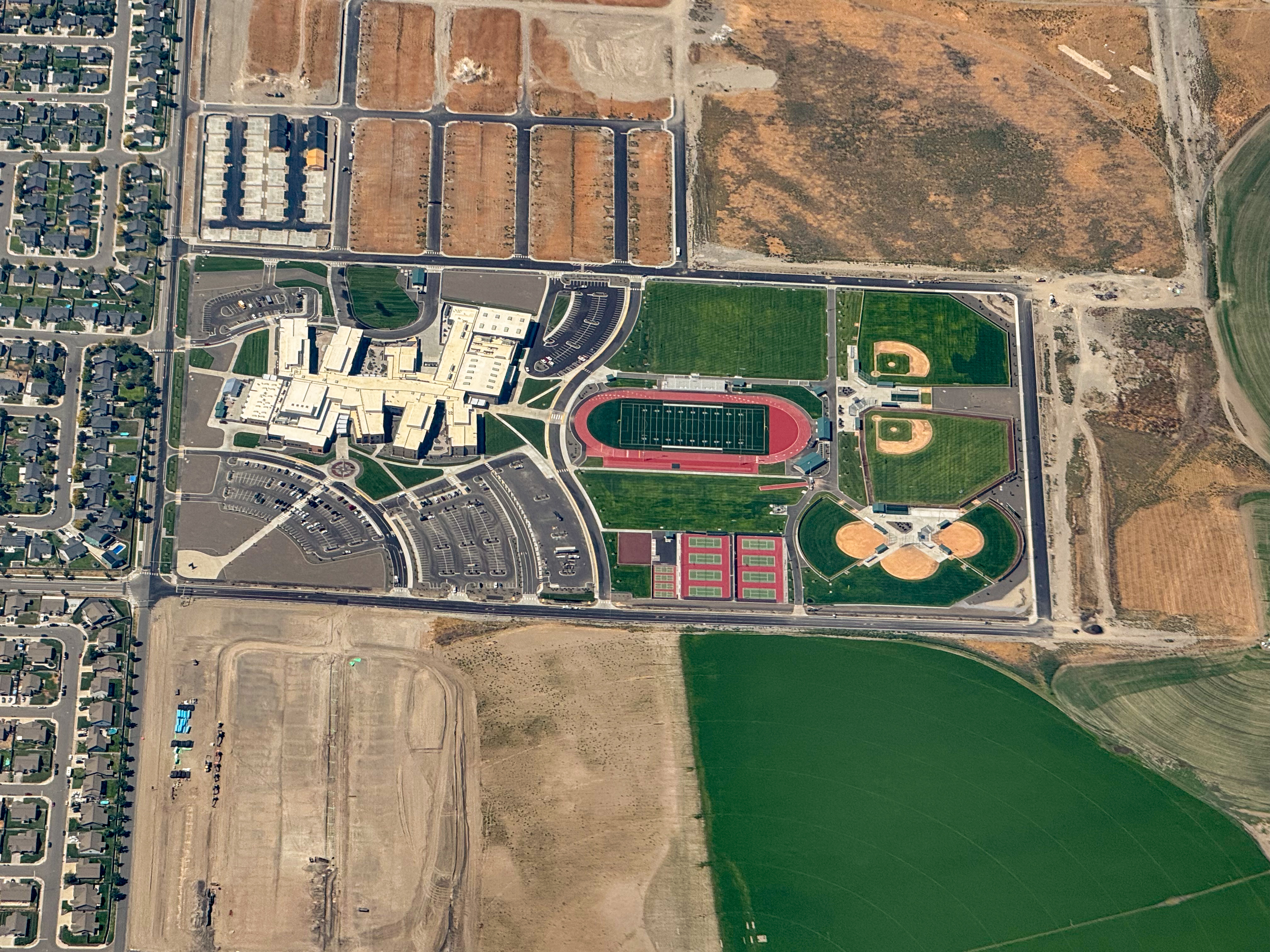
Aerial view of Sageview High School in 2025

Chiawana High School had grown to 2,700 students by 2019, becoming the largest high school in Washington state. Funding to construct a third high school, to be in West Pasco, was approved by voters as part of a $195.5 million bond measure in early 2023. It opened for the 2025–26 school year as Sageview High School; the project cost a total of $185 million to construct. Sageview was originally named Harvest View High School, but was changed after complaints from students and the public, who compared the selected name to a retirement home. A career and college center, named Orion High School, is planned to also open during the 2025–26 school year. In January 2024, the school district purchased 41 acres (17 ha) near the future Sageview High School for a new elementary or middle school.

== List of schools ==
=== Elementary schools ===
As of 2025, the Pasco School District has 17 elementary schools for students in kindergarten through the fifth grade:

- Angelou Elementary School
- Captain Gray STEM Elementary School
- Rowena Chess Elementary School
- Columbia River Elementary School
- Curie STEM Elementary School
- Emerson Elementary School
- Franklin STEM Elementary School
- Frost Elementary School
- Ruth Livingston Elementary School
- Longfellow Elementary School
- Markham Elementary School
- McClintock STEM Elementary School
- James McGee Elementary School
- Virgie Robinson Elementary School
- Three Rivers Elementary School
- Twain Elementary School
- Whittier Elementary School

=== Middle schools ===
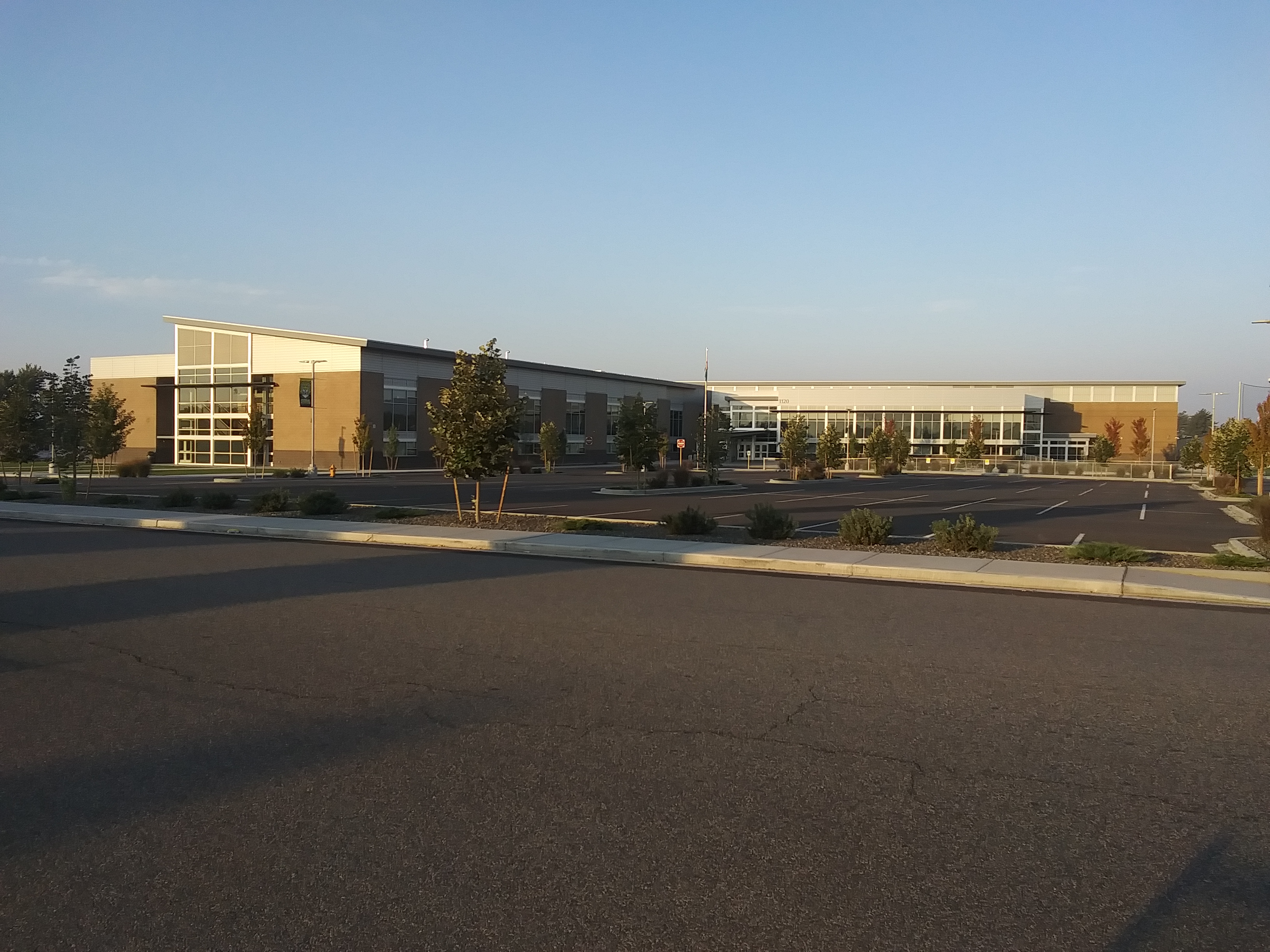
Isaac Stevens Middle School

As of 2025, the Pasco School District has four middle schools for students in the sixth, seventh, and eighth grades:

- McLoughlin Middle School
- Ochoa Middle School
- Reynolds Middle School
- Stevens Middle School

=== High schools ===
As of 2025, the Pasco School District has three traditional high schools and two alternative high schools:

- Chiawana High School
- Delta High School (in partnership with the Kennewick and Richland School Districts)
- New Horizons Alternative High School
- Orion High School
- Pasco High School
- Sageview High School

== Stadium ==
Edgar Brown Memorial Stadium is a 6,000-seat stadium owned by the Pasco School District that serves as the home stadium for the athletic programs at Chiawana and Pasco high schools. It opened on September 13, 1957. Sageview High School will also use the stadium for varsity American football beginning in 2025.
