= Pasco, Washington =

City in Washington, United States

- City
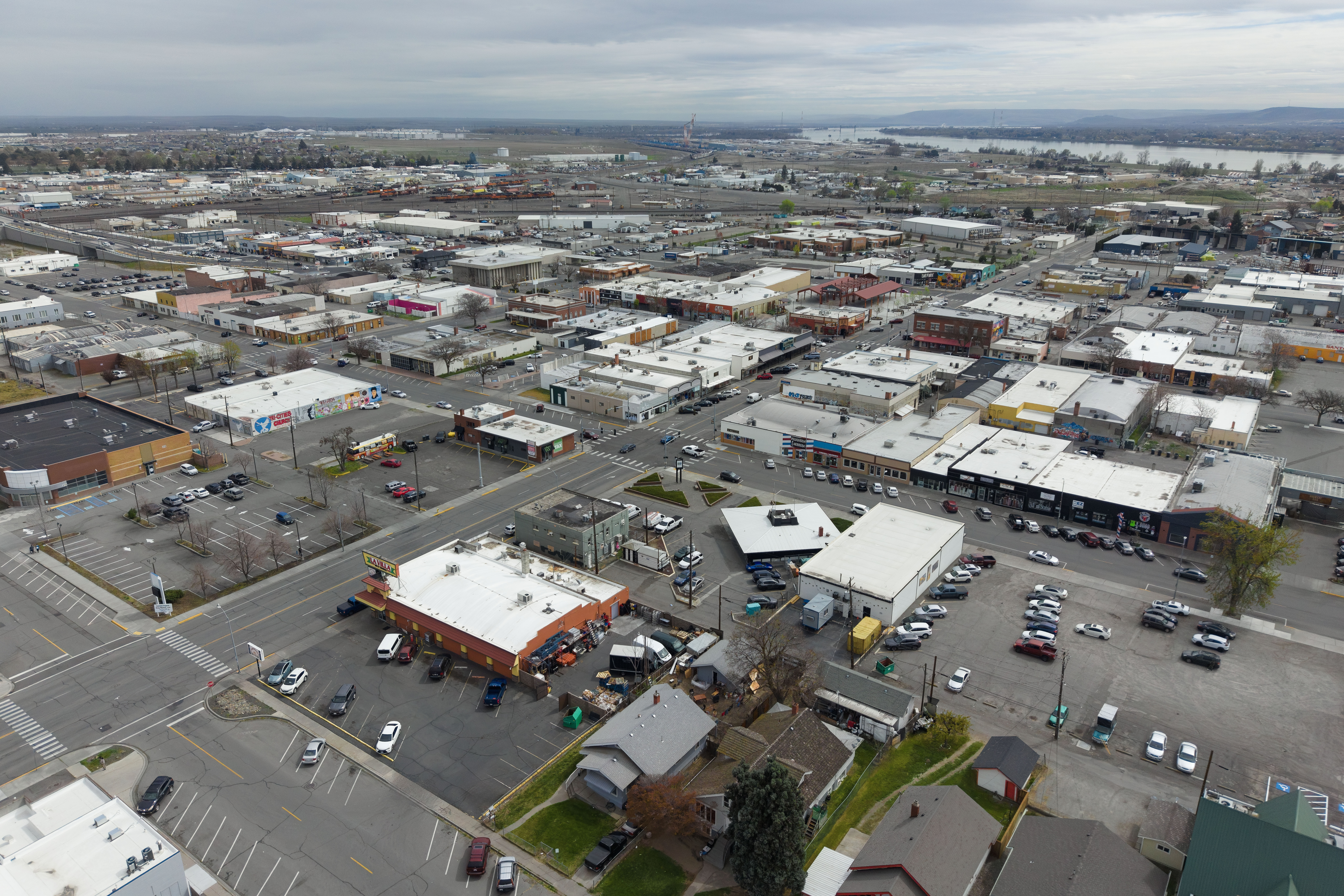
- Downtown Pasco (2026)
- Interactive location map of Pasco
- Coordinates: 46°14′19″N 119°07′31″W
- Country: United States
- State: Washington
- County: Franklin
- Founded: 1891
- Incorporated: September 3, 1891

Government
  - Type: Council–manager
  - Mayor: Charles Grimm
  - City manager: Harold Stewart

Area
  - City: 37.50 sq mi (97.13 km^{2})
  - Land: 33.96 sq mi (87.95 km^{2})
  - Water: 3.54 sq mi (9.18 km^{2})
- Elevation: 390 ft (120 m)

Population (2020)
  - City: 77,108
  - Estimate (2024): 81,724
  - Rank: US: 454th WA: 17th
  - Density: 2,221.4/sq mi (857.67/km^{2})
  - Urban: 255,401 (US: 157th)
  - Metro: 311,469 (US: 165th)
  - CSA: 370,975 (US: 103rd)
  - Tri-Cities: 226,886
- Time zone: UTC-8 (Pacific)
  - Summer (DST): UTC-7 (PDT)
- ZIP codes: 99301, 99302
- Area code: 509
- FIPS code: 53-53545
- GNIS feature ID: 2411381
- Website: pasco-wa.gov

Pasco (/ˈpæskoʊ/ PAS-koh) is a city in and the county seat of Franklin County, Washington, United States. The population was 77,108 at the 2020 census, and estimated at 81,724 in 2024. Pasco is one of three cities (the others being Kennewick and Richland) that make up Washington state's Tri-Cities region, a mid-sized metropolitan area of approximately 303,622 people.

== History ==
On October 16, 1805, the Lewis and Clark Expedition camped in the Pasco area, at a site now commemorated by Sacajawea State Park. The area was frequented by fur trappers and gold traders. In the 1880s, the Northern Pacific Railway was built near the Columbia River, bringing many settlers to the area. Pasco was officially incorporated on September 3, 1891. It was named by Virgil Bogue, a construction engineer for the Northern Pacific Railway after Cerro de Pasco, a city in the Peruvian Andes, where he had helped build a railroad. In its early years Pasco was a small railroad town, but the completion of the Grand Coulee Dam in 1941 brought irrigation and agriculture to the area.

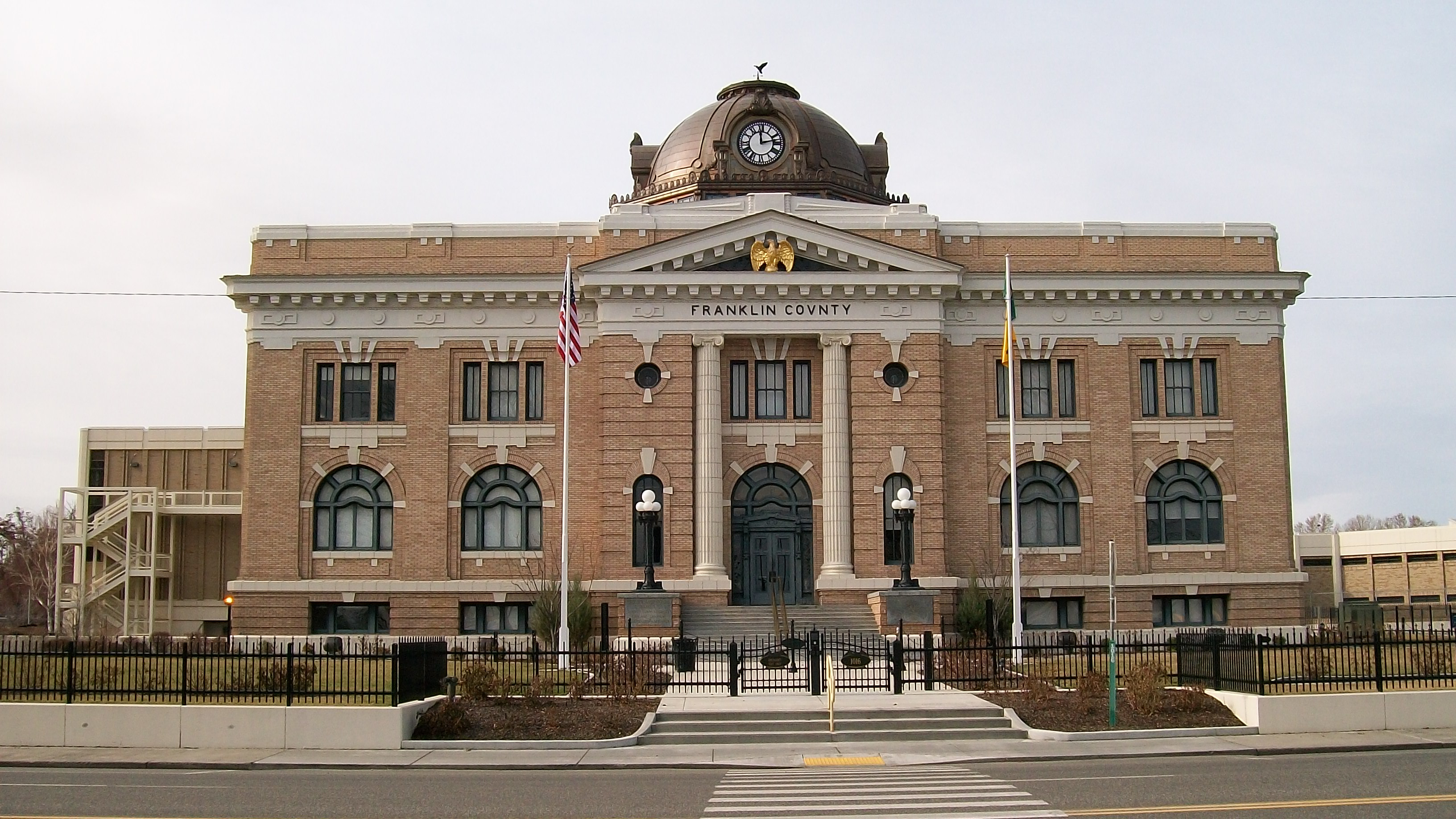
The Franklin County courthouse in Pasco

Due largely to the presence of the Hanford Site (which made the plutonium for the "Fat Man" nuclear bomb used on Nagasaki in 1945), the entire Tri-Cities area grew rapidly from the 1940s through 1950s. However, most of the population influx resided in Richland and Kennewick, as Pasco remained primarily driven by the agricultural industry, and to a lesser degree the NP Pasco rail yards. After the end of World War II, the entire region went through several "boom" and "bust" periods, cycling approximately every 10 years and heavily based on available government funding for Hanford-related work. Farming continues to be the economic driver for most of the city's industrial tax base.

Pasco was not a sundown town in the same way as Richland and Kennewick; however, Jim Crow laws restricted African Americans to living only on the east side of the railroad tracks, which was largely underdeveloped and lacked public water or garbage service. In the 1940s, Edward R. Dudley visited as an investigator from the NAACP and observed widespread discrimination from businesses and law enforcement. In a 1947 survey, black residents listed water supply and service as the most significant problem for the area, and racial discrimination as second. White residents listed over-crowded schools as the most significant problem, and the presence of blacks as second. In 1948, Hazel Scott was refused service at a Pasco restaurant and successfully sued the owners for discrimination, bringing national attention to racial segregation practices in the Tri-Cities. Although the Civil Rights Act made racial housing discrimination illegal, it continued in Pasco as late as 1976.

Pasco completed one of its largest annexations, comprising 7.5 square miles (19 km^{2}) to the northwest, in August 1982 amid a legal dispute with neighboring Richland that was decided by the Washington Supreme Court. In the late 1990s, foreseeing another Hanford-related boom period, several developers purchased large farm circles in Pasco for residential and commercial development. Since that time, Pasco has undergone a transformation that has not only seen its population overtake the neighboring city of Richland, but also has resulted in growth in the city's retail and tourism industries. Recently incorporated land on the West side of the city has exploded into new housing tracts, apartments, and shopping centers. This area of the city has become referred to locally as "West Pasco", distinguishing it from the older area of town to the East. In addition to an influx of new residents to the region, many residents of the Tri-Cities have moved from Richland and Kennewick to West Pasco due to its central location and virtually all-new housing and business. In early 2018, plans were announced for 5,000 to 8,000 new residences in West Pasco, west of Road 100.

== Geography ==
According to the United States Census Bureau, the city has a total area of 34.08 square miles (88.27 km^{2}), of which 30.50 square miles (78.99 km^{2}) is land and 3.58 square miles (9.27 km^{2}) is water.

The Columbia River borders the south side of the city, separating it from the neighboring cities of Richland and Kennewick.

=== Climate ===
As Pasco is located in Southeastern Washington, the city lies in the rain shadow of the Cascade Range. As a result, the area is a windswept desert, receiving little precipitation throughout the year. Hot summers, warm springs, and cold winters provide a stark contrast to other areas of the state. Climate data is sparse, as there is no functioning weather station in the city; more reliable data is provided by the weather station in nearby Walla Walla.

Climate data for Pasco, Washington
Month	Jan	Feb	Mar	Apr	May	Jun	Jul	Aug	Sep	Oct	Nov	Dec	Year
Record high °F (°C)	67 (19)	68 (20)	80 (27)	94 (34)	101 (38)	115 (46)	112 (44)	111 (44)	102 (39)	88 (31)	77 (25)	69 (21)	115 (46)
Mean daily maximum °F (°C)	42.2 (5.7)	49.8 (9.9)	59.5 (15.3)	67.0 (19.4)	76.1 (24.5)	83.3 (28.5)	93.3 (34.1)	91.0 (32.8)	80.9 (27.2)	66.2 (19.0)	50.4 (10.2)	40.9 (4.9)	67.0 (19.4)
Mean daily minimum °F (°C)	28.6 (−1.9)	29.0 (−1.7)	33.7 (0.9)	38.2 (3.4)	46.0 (7.8)	52.7 (11.5)	57.6 (14.2)	56.0 (13.3)	47.2 (8.4)	38.8 (3.8)	31.5 (−0.3)	26.9 (−2.8)	40.7 (4.8)
Record low °F (°C)	−19 (−28)	4 (−16)	15 (−9)	21 (−6)	28 (−2)	37 (3)	42 (6)	40 (4)	30 (−1)	9 (−13)	−12 (−24)	−9 (−23)	−19 (−28)
Average precipitation inches (mm)	0.95 (24)	0.55 (14)	0.67 (17)	0.47 (12)	0.74 (19)	0.68 (17)	0.14 (3.6)	0.18 (4.6)	0.33 (8.4)	0.54 (14)	0.76 (19)	1.09 (28)	7.1 (180.6)
Average snowfall inches (cm)	0.3 (0.76)	trace	trace	trace	0.0 (0.0)	0.0 (0.0)	0.0 (0.0)	0.0 (0.0)	0.0 (0.0)	0.0 (0.0)	1.1 (2.8)	2.1 (5.3)	6.1 (15)
Source: WRCC

== Demographics ==
Historical population
Census	Pop.	Note	%±
1890	320		—
1900	254		−20.6%
1910	2,083		720.1%
1920	3,362		61.4%
1930	3,496		4.0%
1940	3,913		11.9%
1950	10,228		161.4%
1960	14,522		42.0%
1970	13,920		−4.1%
1980	18,428		32.4%
1990	20,337		10.4%
2000	32,066		57.7%
2010	59,781		86.4%
2020	77,108		29.0%
2024 (est.)	81,724		6.0%
U.S. Decennial Census; 2020 Census

=== 2020 census ===
As of the 2020 census, there were 77,108 people and 23,653 households in Pasco. The median age was 30.0 years.

32.5% of residents were under the age of 18 and 9.6% were 65 years of age or older; for every 100 females there were 100.0 males, and for every 100 females age 18 and over there were 99.2 males age 18 and over.

99.8% of residents lived in urban areas, while 0.2% lived in rural areas.

Of the households, 48.0% had children under the age of 18 living in them, 52.9% were married-couple households, 16.2% were households with a male householder and no spouse or partner present, and 22.1% were households with a female householder and no spouse or partner present; about 17.0% of all households were made up of individuals and 6.4% had someone living alone who was 65 years of age or older.

There were 24,334 housing units, of which 2.8% were vacant; the homeowner vacancy rate was 0.6% and the rental vacancy rate was 3.4%.

Racial composition as of the 2020 census
Race	Number	Percentage
White	34,779	45.1%
Black or African American	1,285	1.7%
American Indian and Alaska Native	1,083	1.4%
Asian	1,654	2.1%
Native Hawaiian and Other Pacific Islander	217	0.3%
Some other race	24,893	32.3%
Two or more races	13,197	17.1%
Hispanic or Latino (of any race)	44,350	57.5%

=== 2010 census ===
As of the 2010 census, there were 59,781 people, 17,983 households, and 13,863 families living in the city. The population density was 1,960.0 inhabitants per square mile (756.8/km^{2}). There were 18,782 housing units at an average density of 615.8 per square mile (237.8/km^{2}). The racial makeup of the city was 55.8% White, 1.9% African American, 0.5% Native American, 1.9% Asian, 0.1% Pacific Islander, 36.4% from other races, and 3.3% from two or more races. Hispanic or Latino of any race were 55.7% of the population.

There were 17,983 households, of which 51.3% had children under the age of 18 living with them, 55.1% were married couples living together, 14.9% had a female householder with no husband present, 7.1% had a male householder with no wife present, and 22.9% were non-families. 17.0% of all households were made up of individuals, and 5.3% had someone living alone who was 65 years of age or older. The average household size was 3.30 and the average family size was 3.73.

The median age in the city was 27.3 years. 35.5% of residents were under the age of 18; 10.6% were between the ages of 18 and 24; 29.9% were from 25 to 44; 17.2% were from 45 to 64; and 6.7% were 65 years of age or older. The gender makeup of the city was 50.7% male and 49.3% female.

=== 2000 census ===
As of the 2000 census, there were 32,066 people, 9,619 households, and 7,262 families living in the city. The population density was 1,141.9 people per square mile (440.9/km^{2}). There were 10,341 housing units at an average density of 368.2 per square mile (142.2/km^{2}). The racial makeup of the city was 52.76% White, 3.22% African American, 0.77% Native American, 1.77% Asian, 0.14% Pacific Islander, 37.44% from other races, and 3.9% from two or more races. Hispanic or Latino of any race was 56.26% of the population.

There were 9,619 households, out of which 45.6% had children under the age of 18 living with them, 54.7% were married couples living together, 14.3% had a female householder with no husband present, and 24.5% were non-families. 20.1% of all households were made up of individuals, and 8.5% had someone living alone who was 65 years of age or older. The average household size was 3.30 and the average family size was 3.79.

In the city, the age distribution of the population shows 35.5% under the age of 18, 11.8% from 18 to 24, 28.5% from 25 to 44, 15.5% from 45 to 64, and 8.7% who were 65 years of age or older. The median age was 27 years. For every 100 females, there were 106.7 males. For every 100 females age 18 and over, there were 104.2 males.

The median income for a household in the city was $34,540, and the median income for a family was $37,342. Males had a median income of $29,016 versus $22,186 for females. The per capita income for the city was $13,404. About 19.5% of families and 23.3% of the population were below the poverty line, including 31.4% of those under age 18 and 9.6% of those age 65 or over.

== Economy ==
Due to the agricultural region in which it sits, several large food processing companies have a presence in the city of Pasco: Lamb Weston, Reser's Fine Foods, and Twin City Foods. In recent years, the region has become a major player in Washington state's booming wine industry.

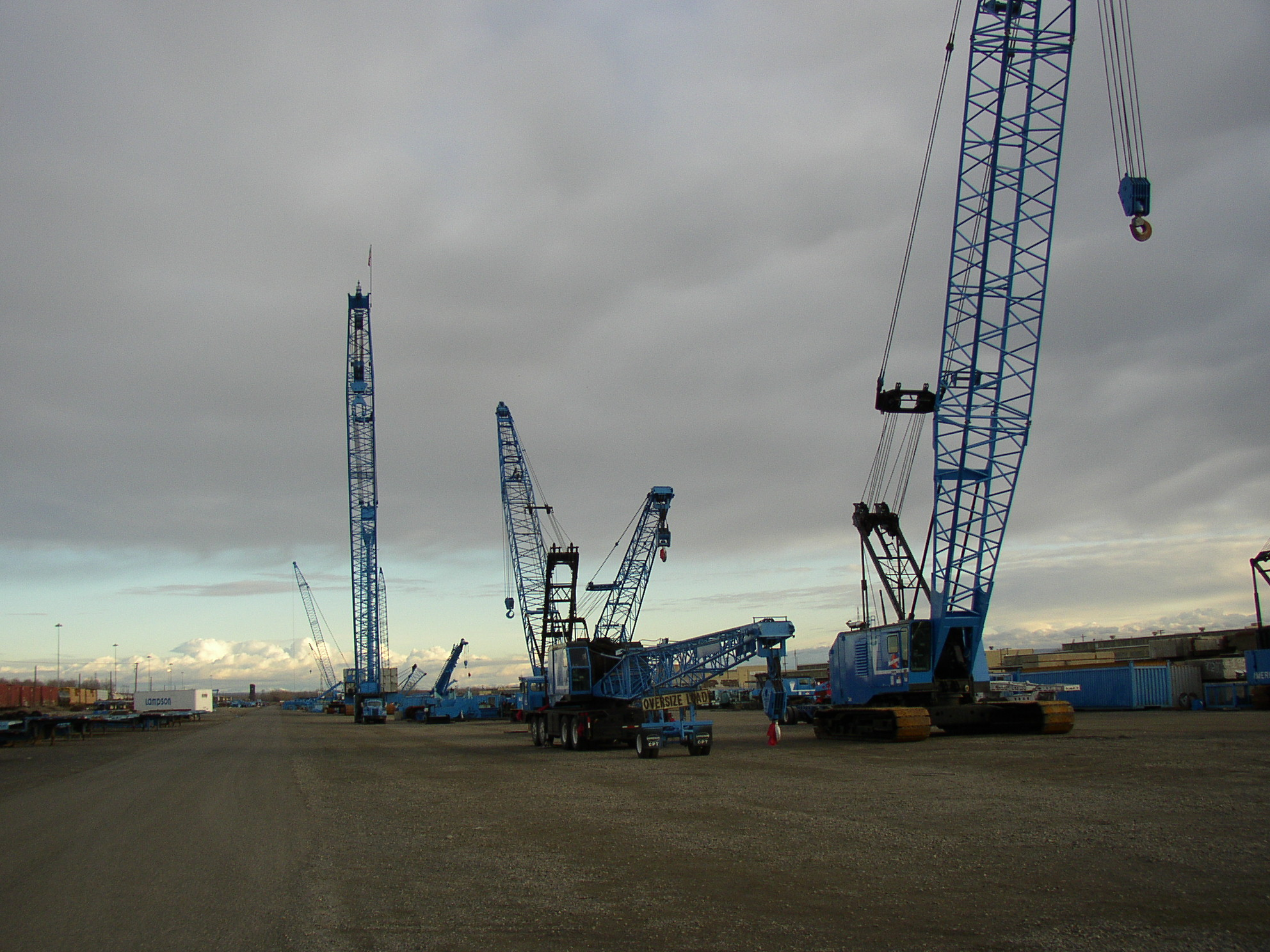
Lampson Crane yard, Port of Big Pasco, in Pasco

Some of Pasco's largest employers include Hanford nuclear facility, BNSF Railway, Lamb Weston, Boise Cascade, Tyson Foods, Energy Northwest, Fluor Hanford Inc., Bechtel National Inc., and Pacific Northwest National Laboratory currently managed by Battelle Memorial Institute

== Arts and culture ==
Among all of Pasco's annual activities and events, the most popular is the Pasco Farmers Market, located in downtown Pasco. The market is open on Saturdays from May through October each year, drawing a large regional crowd and providing an outlet for farmers selling fresh produce. The city is also home to the Pasco Flea Market, the largest open-air flea market in Washington state. It has up to 10,000 vendors and workers on a 70-acre (28 ha) lot; the flea market runs from March to October on weekends. The market was first organized in 1987 and moved three years later to its present location in eastern Pasco.

The Fiery Foods Festival is another popular event held each September. This one-day event celebrates spicy foods of all varieties and highlights the Hispanic culture of the city.

Pasco hosts the Tri-Cities Pride Festival, with an estimated attendance of 2,000 in 2022. It began in 2016, and organizers cancelled plans for 2023 as they reorganize as a nonprofit organization for future planning. In the interim, local businesses and residents planned LGBT pride events of their own despite harassment, vandalism, threats of violence and lack of support from elected officials.

Pasco is served by the Mid-Columbia Libraries system, which has branches in downtown and West Pasco.

== Parks and recreation ==
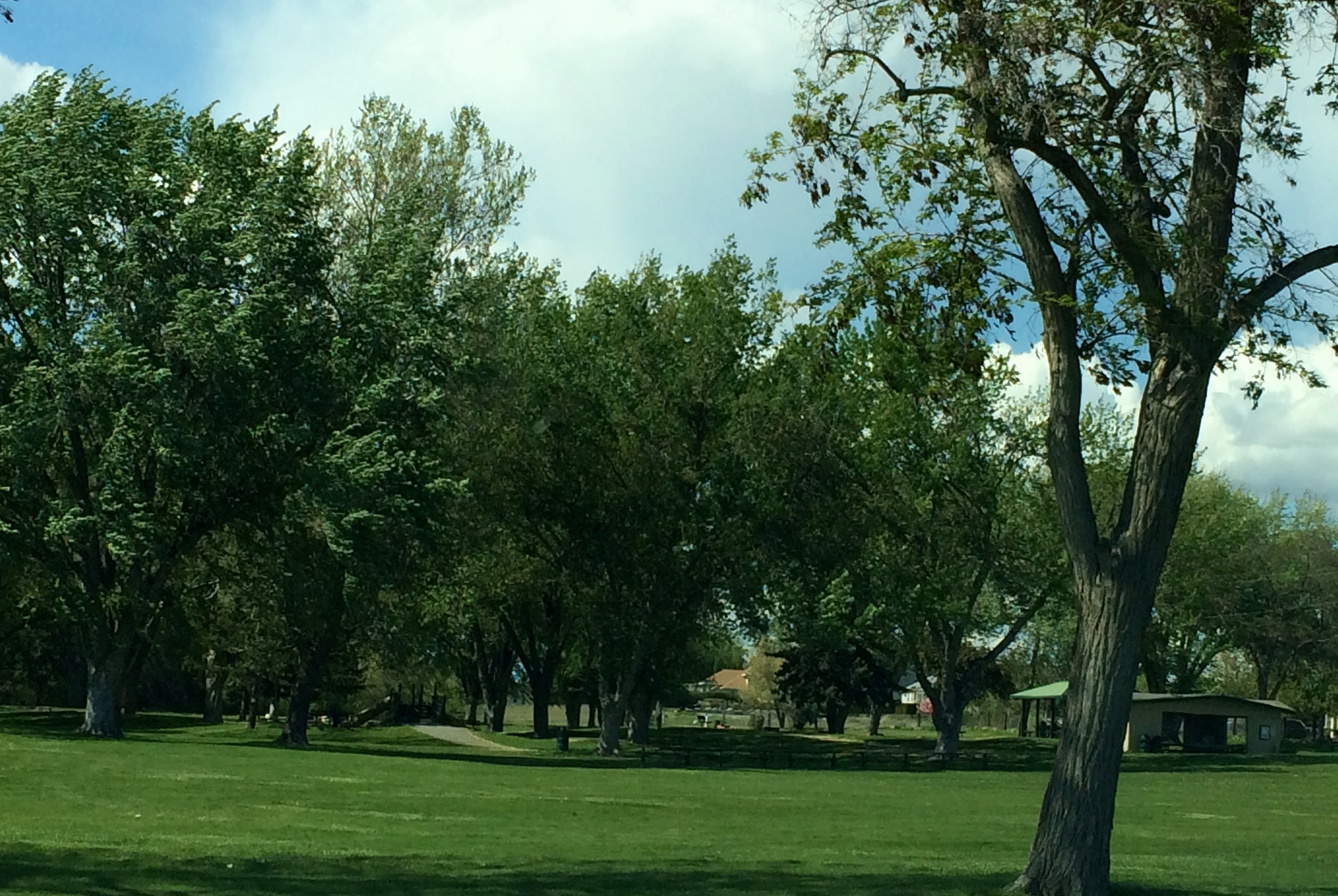
Chiawana Park in Pasco

Pasco's Gesa Stadium hosts the Tri-City Dust Devils, a minor league baseball team playing in the Northwest League and affiliated with the Los Angeles Angels. The Pasco School District's renovated Edgar Brown Memorial Stadium, constructed in a former gravel pit used in the construction of the Blue Bridge (Pioneer Memorial Bridge), provides a unique venue for outdoor athletic events.

Pasco is located along a major stretch of the 22-mile (35 km) Sacagawea Heritage Trail, an interactive educational and recreational hiking/cycling loop that circles the Tri-Cities area. A city-operated water park, named the Pasco Aquatics Center, is scheduled to open in 2026. It is planned to feature an indoor swimming area, outdoor pools, and classrooms.

Pasco has several waterfront parks along the Columbia River, as well as easy river access for boaters, fishers, and skiers at any of the free boat launches.

The HAPO Center (formerly the TRAC) is a large complex located in Pasco which hosts regional events, including (but not limited to) conventions, meetings, sporting events, and concerts. The HAPO Center is located near the booming Road 68 corridor in Pasco.

== Government ==
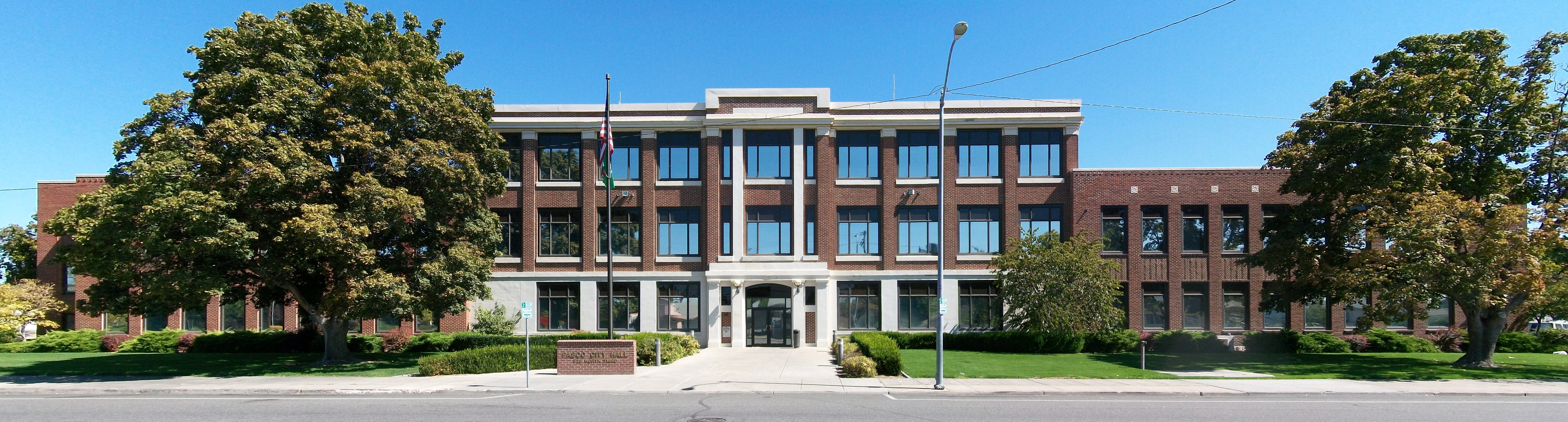
Pasco City Hall

Pasco has a council–manager government with an elected body of seven council members, six of whom are from specific districts within the city, and one elected at-large. The council biennially elects from its own members a mayor that runs meetings, signs certain documents, and acts in ceremonial capacity; and a mayor pro-tem that acts in the mayor's absence. Since 2026, the mayor has been Charles Grimm and mayor pro tem has been David Milne. The city manager is chosen by the council as a professional administrator and runs day-to-day operations of the city including management of staff. Council members are part-time legislators. Those elected 2017 and after receive $1,115 per month and the mayor receives $1,450 a month.

The city also has a number of advisory boards appointed by the council and includes citizen volunteers that give their time and expertise in dealing with issues including parks, senior citizen issues, planning, code enforcement, etc.

== Education ==
Pasco is served by the Pasco School District, Columbia Basin College, and Washington State University Tri-Cities.

Pasco High School is the older of the city's two public high schools, and was the largest in the state before Chiawana was built. The city's second high school—Chiawana High School—opened in August 2009. Chiawana, along with Pasco High, are among the largest high schools in Washington state. A third high school, Sageview, opened in 2025 to relieve crowding at Chiawana.

There are four middle schools in Pasco, serving students ranging from grade six to eight. The school district has 18 elementary schools. In spring 2015, Delta High School (or DHS) opened in Pasco. It provides a STEM-based curriculum for students in grades 9–12 from three school districts in the Tri-Cities area. The school is operated as a collaborative effort by the Kennewick School District, Pasco School District, and Richland School District, and in partnerships with a local skill center, colleges, and businesses. The school has been designated by the state as an Existing Innovative School.

Privately, Pasco and the greater Tri-Cities area is served by Tri-Cities Prep, a Catholic high school off of Road 100, and St. Patrick's grade school next door to the campus of Pasco High School.

With a rapidly growing campus, Columbia Basin College is the largest public two-year community college in Southeastern Washington with a student body of nearly 7,000 students. The college was founded in 1955 and serves students from the entire Tri-Cities region.

== Media ==
The Tri-City Herald, a daily newspaper based in Kennewick, serves Pasco and the surrounding area. It traces its origin to a pair of Pasco newspapers established in the 1890s that later merged into the Pasco Herald, a weekly newspaper. It moved to Kennewick and became a daily newspaper in 1947, renaming itself to the Tri-City Herald.

== Infrastructure ==
=== Transportation ===
Pasco is bisected by several major highways that provide connections within the Tri-Cities and onward to other parts of Washington state. Interstate 182 runs east–west across the city and connects with Interstate 82 west of Richland; it also carries U.S. Route 12, which continues east from the Tri-Cities to Walla Walla and Lewiston, Idaho. U.S. Route 395 enters from the south on the Blue Bridge over the Columbia River and continues north towards Spokane and the Canadian border. A secondary bridge, the Cable Bridge, carries State Route 397 from Kennewick to Pasco. Public transit service within Pasco and the Tri-Cities is provided by Ben Franklin Transit, which is funded by a sales tax in portions of Benton and Franklin counties. As of 2024, an average of 2,700 daily passengers use Ben Franklin Transit within Pasco.

The Tri-Cities region's lone passenger rail station is the Pasco Intermodal Train Station, which is served by the daily Empire Builder operated by Amtrak. The train has service west to Portland, Oregon, and east to Spokane, St. Paul, Minnesota, and Chicago. The original station in Pasco was built by the Northern Pacific Railway and replaced in 1998 by a new facility. The BNSF Railway operates freight railroads that pass through Pasco and has a railyard within the city. The Pasco Yard, a classification yard, is the company's largest facility in the Pacific Northwest and was completed in 1955. Additional commercial transportation is undertaken through extensive barge traffic on the Columbia and Snake rivers.

Pasco is home to the Tri-Cities Airport, a regional airport that has passenger service and is also used for commercial and general aviation. As of 2025, six airlines serve Tri-Cities Airport with direct flights to cities in the Western and Central U.S., including several daily connections to Seattle–Tacoma International Airport. The airport had 478,000 passengers on commercial flights in 2024.

== Notable people ==
- Jeremy Bonderman, professional baseball player
- Kathy Brock, television journalist
- Arthur Fletcher, politician, United Nations delegate, and first Black city councilmember
- Hawthorne C. Gray, U.S. Army Captain and record-breaking balloonist
- S. T. Gordon, world Cruiserweight boxing champion
- Doc Hastings, U.S. Congressman
- James Wong Howe, Academy Award-winning cinematographer
- Michael Jackson, professional American football player
- Bruce Kison, professional baseball player, two-time World Series champion
- Chuck Palahniuk, novelist
- Jeannie Russell, actress
- Joseph Santos, artist and painter
- Ron Silliman, poet
- Brian Urlacher, professional American football player
- Kristine W, singer/songwriter and former Miss Washington
- Ray Washburn, professional baseball player, two-time World Series champion
- Maris Wrixon, film actress
- Summer Yates, professional soccer player
