= Hanford High School =

Public school in Washington, United States

Coordinates: 46°19′31″N 119°16′03″W

- 450 Hanford Street; Richland, WA, 99354

Information
- Type: Public
- Established: 1972
- School district: Richland School District
- Principal: Mike Johnson
- Teaching staff: 83 (FTE)
- Enrollment: 1,958 (2023–2024)
- Student to teacher ratio: 23.70
- Colors: Purple and gold
- Mascot: Falcon
- Rival: Richland High School
- Website: https://hanford.rsd.edu

Hanford High School is a public high school located on the northern edge of Richland, Washington. It is part of the Richland School District. The school's mascot is the Falcon, and its school colors are purple and gold.

== History ==
The high school, built in 1972, was originally part of a K-12 complex, which included an elementary and junior high (later a middle school). The name of the school reflects the area's significant history as the location of the Hanford Site, a crucial facility during the Manhattan Project in World War II. Notably, a previous Hanford high School building existed in the area as early as 1916 and was utilized for offices related to the Manhattan Project during that era.

The elementary school was closed in the mid-1980s due to school district budget cuts, and the middle school was closed in 2005 when Enterprise Middle School was opened in West Richland in the same year. The latest remodel/rebuild of the high school building was completed in 2007.

== Sports ==
Hanford competes in WIAA Class 4A, and is a member of the Mid-Columbia Conference in District Eight.

=== State championships ===
- Baseball: 1985, 1987
- Girls basketball: 1986
- Girls bowling: 2016
- Boys golf: 2007
- Girls golf: 1995, 2012, 2013
- Girls soccer: 1989
- Fastpitch softball: 2003
- Volleyball: 2007

== Notable alumni ==
- Nate Mendel (1987), bassist for Foo Fighters
- Aaron Neary (2011), NFL player
- Jason Repko (1999) MLB player for the Los Angeles Dodgers
- Rachel Willis-Sørensen (2002), opera singer
