= Mt. Rainier Scenic Railroad locomotives =

List of the locomotives on the Mount Rainier Scenic Railroad

This is a list of the locomotives of the Mount Rainier Scenic Railroad (the "MRSR"). Railroads listed in the headings are the railroads designated by the current paint scheme.

== Rod steam locomotives ==
The vast majority of steam locomotives constructed are rod engines, where the main rods directly connect the pistons to the wheels. The driver wheels are held within a rigid frame, making these locomotives better for well-constructed track with gentler curves and smaller changes in elevation.

=== Satsop Railroad no. 1 "C.F. White", Porter 0-4-2T ===
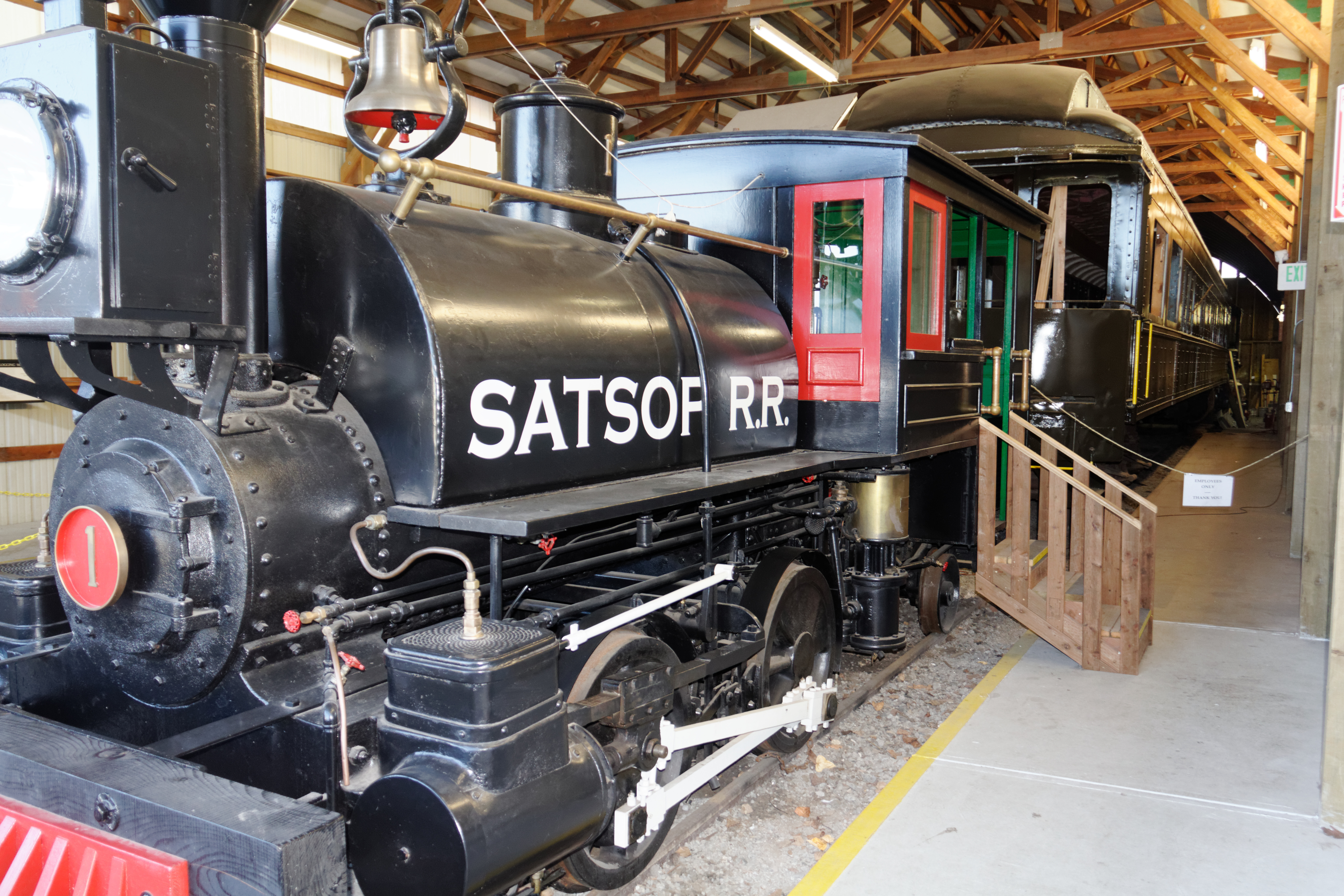
Old No. 1 on display at the museum, 2017

Built by H.K. Porter in June 1885 for the Satsop Railroad as their #1. This locomotive is one of only four standard gauge Porter 0-4-2T's ever built for the logging industry in Washington State, and was the first rod steam locomotive in Mason County. Originally named "Currie," then later the "C.F. White," the #1 hauled logs and performed other switching duties for several railroad entities, all of which were components of the Simpson Logging Company, which exists today as the Simpson Timber Company. Satsop RR #1 became the Washington Southern Railroad #1 in 1891, then the Peninsular Railway #1 in 1895, followed by the Shelton Logging Co. #1 in 1899. Three years later, the #1 was once again a Peninsular Railway Co. engine, but renumbered to #6. Finally in 1935, the #6 became Simpson Logging Co. #1. After 60+ years of service, the Porter was placed on display at Simpson's Camp Grisdale as Satsop #1, the "C.F. White."

Simpson engineer and prolific live-steam locomotive manufacturer Dave Skagen, together with Bill Parsons, acquired the #1 in 1985. The #1 was moved to Mr. Parsons' shop where the boiler was re-tubed. The #1 was then relocated to Skagen's shop where the rest of the locomotive was rehabilitated to serviceable condition. Skagen constructed about 1,500 feet of standard gauge track on his property and occasionally operated the Porter at his home or on Simpson trackage. Skagen also constructed a small, 4-wheel "bobber" style caboose to pull behind the #1. In 1995, the Satsop RR. #1, caboose and a 4-wheel, center-dump ballast car were sold to the Super Mall of the Great Northwest, located in Auburn, WA, and moved there for display outside the south entrance to the mall. In 2013, the #1 was moved by truck to the MRSR's Mineral, WA restoration/repair facility, and cosmetically restored to its Satsop RR appearance. Stored inoperable after a cosmetic restoration.

=== MRSR no. 5, Porter 2-8-2 ===
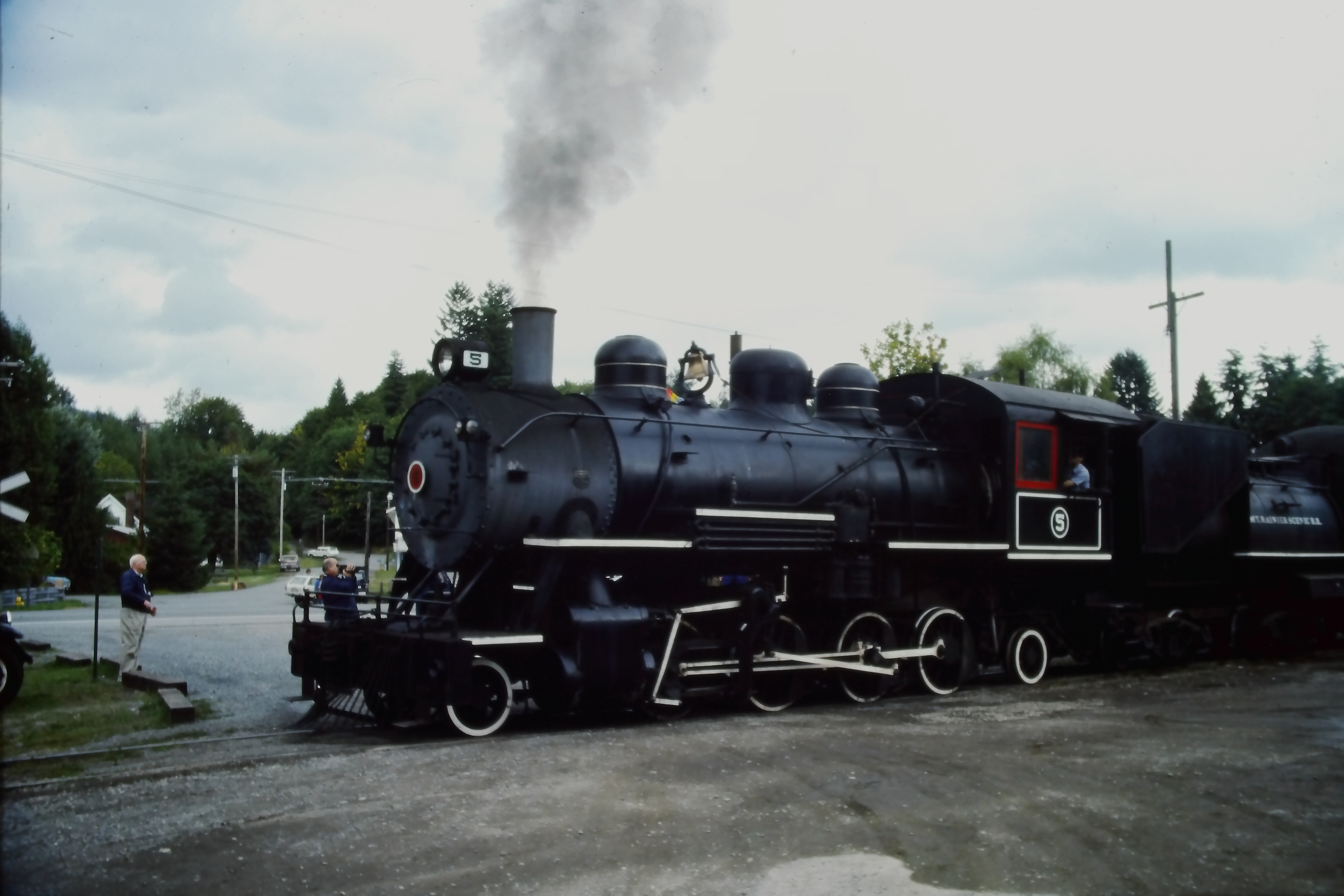
No. 5 in Elbe.

Built in 1924 by H.K. Porter for the Carlton & Coast Railroad of Carlton, Oregon as their #55. Porter was known for small industrial tank engines, but by the 20s they had decided to expand their business. This engine, a 70 ton 2-8-2 mikado, is one of the largest Porter locomotives ever built. When the Carlton & Coast was abandoned in 1940, they sold their #55 to the Port of Grays Harbor, where it was renumbered to #5 and became a dock switcher in Hoquiam, Washington. Restored in the early 1980s beginning in 1986 and operated as MRSR's workhorse until 2003 since being a switch engine. Under restoration.

=== Hammond Lumber Company no. 17, Alco 2-8-2T ===
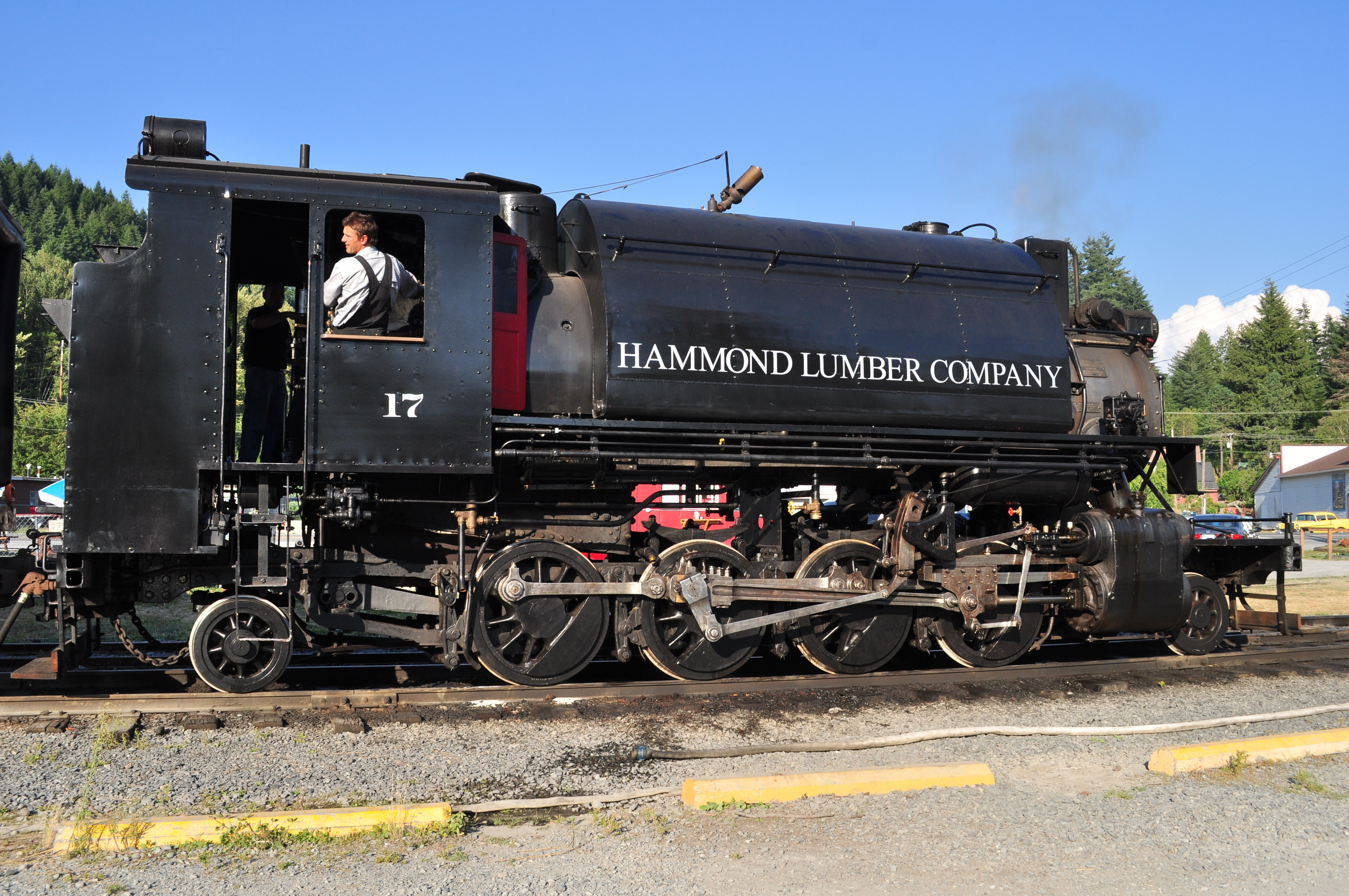
No. 17 switching in Elbe, Washington

Built by Alco for the Crosset Western Co. in Wauna, Oregon in 1929, and was sold to the Hammond Lumber Co. of Samoa, California in 1942. It was sold to the Klamath & Hoppow Valley Railroad in 1965, and operated there into the seventies. It was then purchased by MRSR in 1980 and operated from 1995 to 2011 until taken out of service for 1,472 day inspection and rebuild. It returned to service in 2013, and is technically still within her boiler ticket, but is stored out of service due to the cost of needed repairs outweighing the worth of the remaining time on her boiler. Stored inoperable.

=== Polson Logging Company no. 70, Baldwin 2-8-2 ===
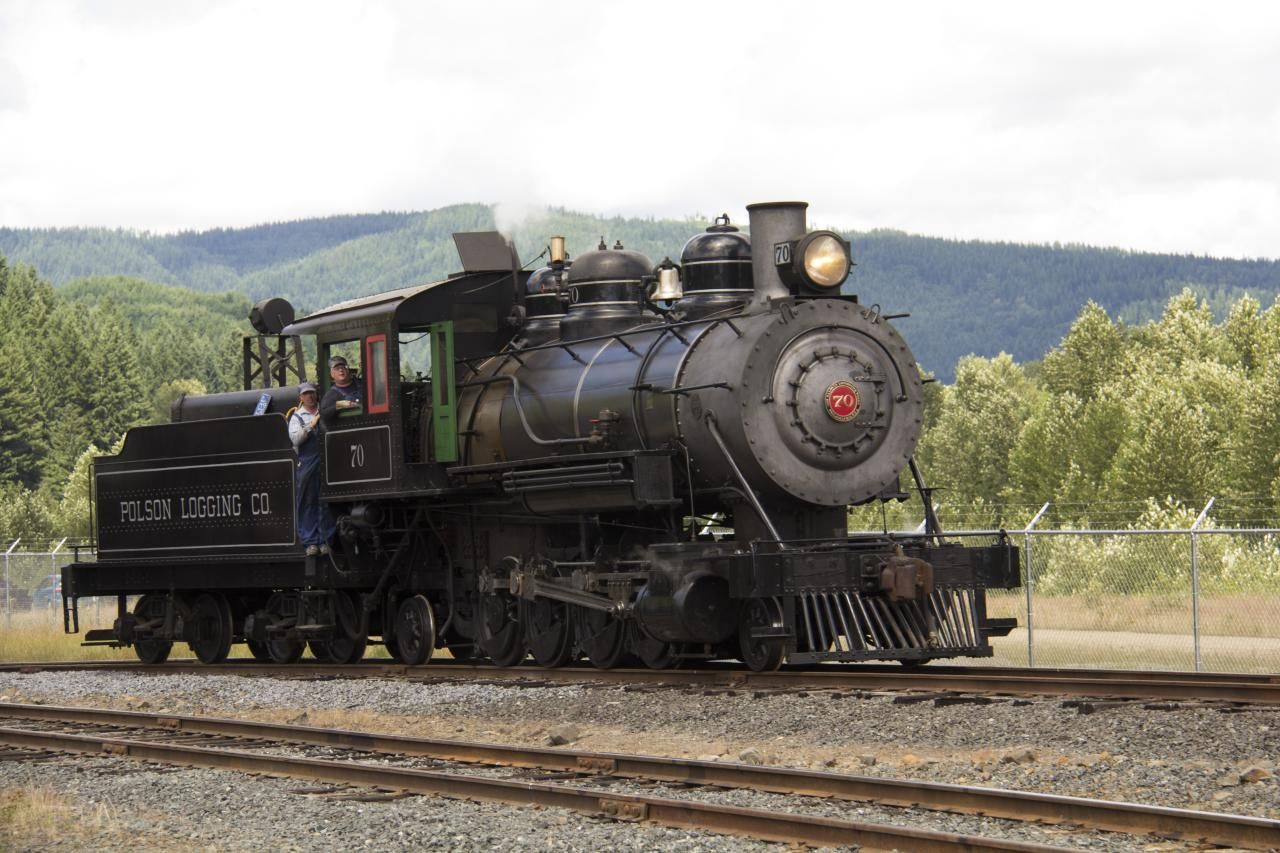
No. 70 under steam at Mineral, Washington

Built by the Baldwin Locomotive Works for Polson Brothers Logging Company of Hoquiam, Washington in 1922, which was acquired by Rayonier in 1945. It was retired in 1963 and purchased from Rayonier by Maynard Lang, and operated in Snoqualmie for the Puget Sound Railway Historical Association from 1966 until it was rendered inoperable in 1983. It was then sold to MRSR in 1992 after Lang's death. MRSR restored it to operable condition in 2011. It was later put out of service due to lead truck issues, but returned to service in 2017. After the FRA granted a waiver in 2025 to extend its service to the end of the calendar year, it was put out of service at the beginning of 2026 for its mandatory 1472-service-day boiler inspection. Operational as of 07/04/2026.

== Geared steam locomotives ==
Some locomotives use gearing in their drivetrain, instead of the rods used on rod engines. These geared engines provide excellent low end torque, allowing for heavier trains on steeper grades. The drive wheels are mounted to "trucks" similar to those of a common freight car, which allow the engines to negotiate tight curves and rough track. The gear reduction limits top speeds significantly, and increases locomotive maintenance due to having more parts that can wear out.

=== Rayonier no. 2, Willamette ===
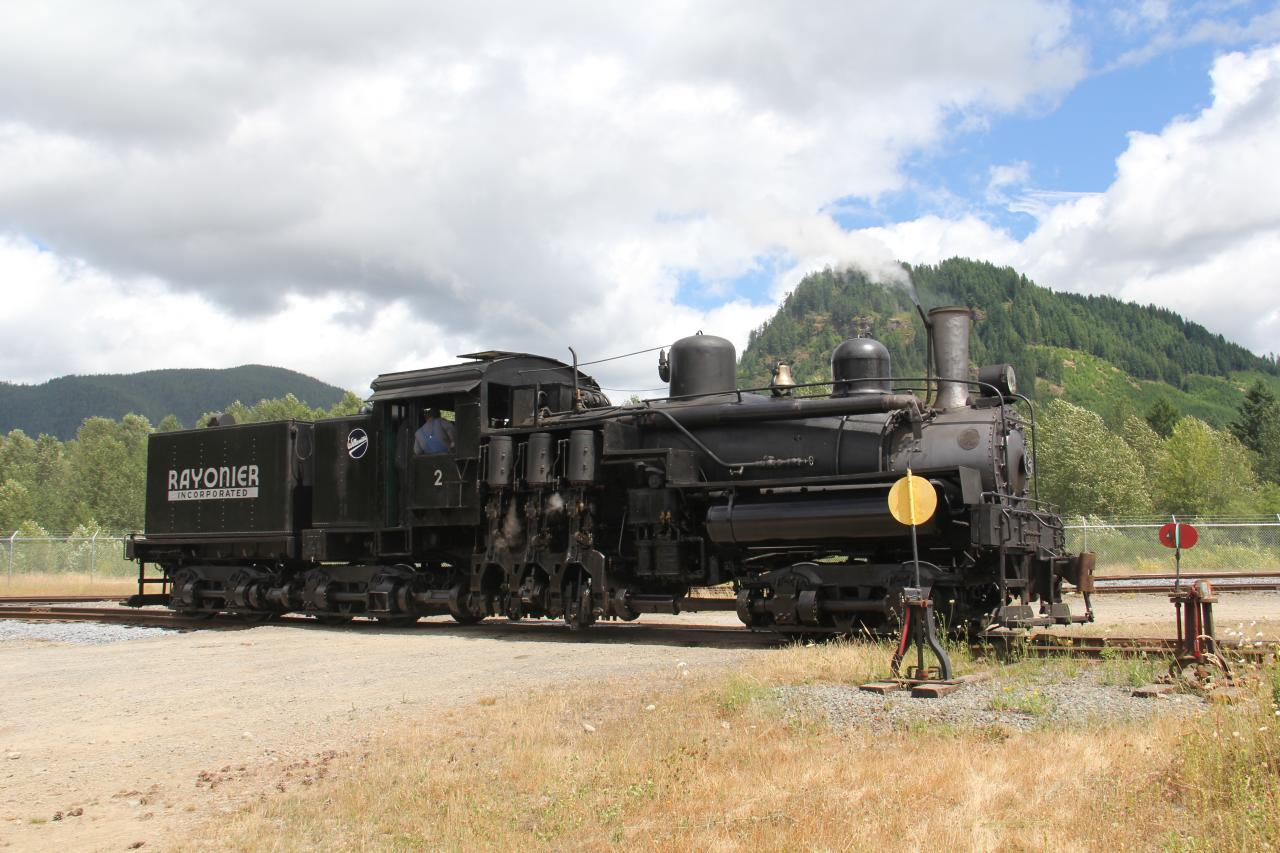
No. 2 under steam at Mineral, Washington

Built by the Willamette Iron and Steel Works in Portland, Oregon in 1929 for the J. Neils Lumber Company in Klickitat, Washington as their #6. It was then sold to Rayonier in 1949 for operation in Sekiu, Washington, was renumbered to 2, and worked there until 1962. Jim Gertz, a Rayonier employee, bought the engine and moved #2 to his home in Port Angeles, Washington. Gertz donated the engine to the MRSR in 2002.

Its design is that of a refined Shay locomotive, to which it gave significant competition. In return, Lima developed the "Pacific Coast Shay" (exemplified by MRSR's #11), and Heisler developed their "West Coast Special Heisler" (exemplified by MRSR's #91). It was the final locomotive build by Willamette, and, before the MRSR pronounced it inoperable due to required boiler maintenance, the only operational Willamette engine in the world. Stored inoperable.

=== Hillcrest Lumber Company no. 10, Climax ===
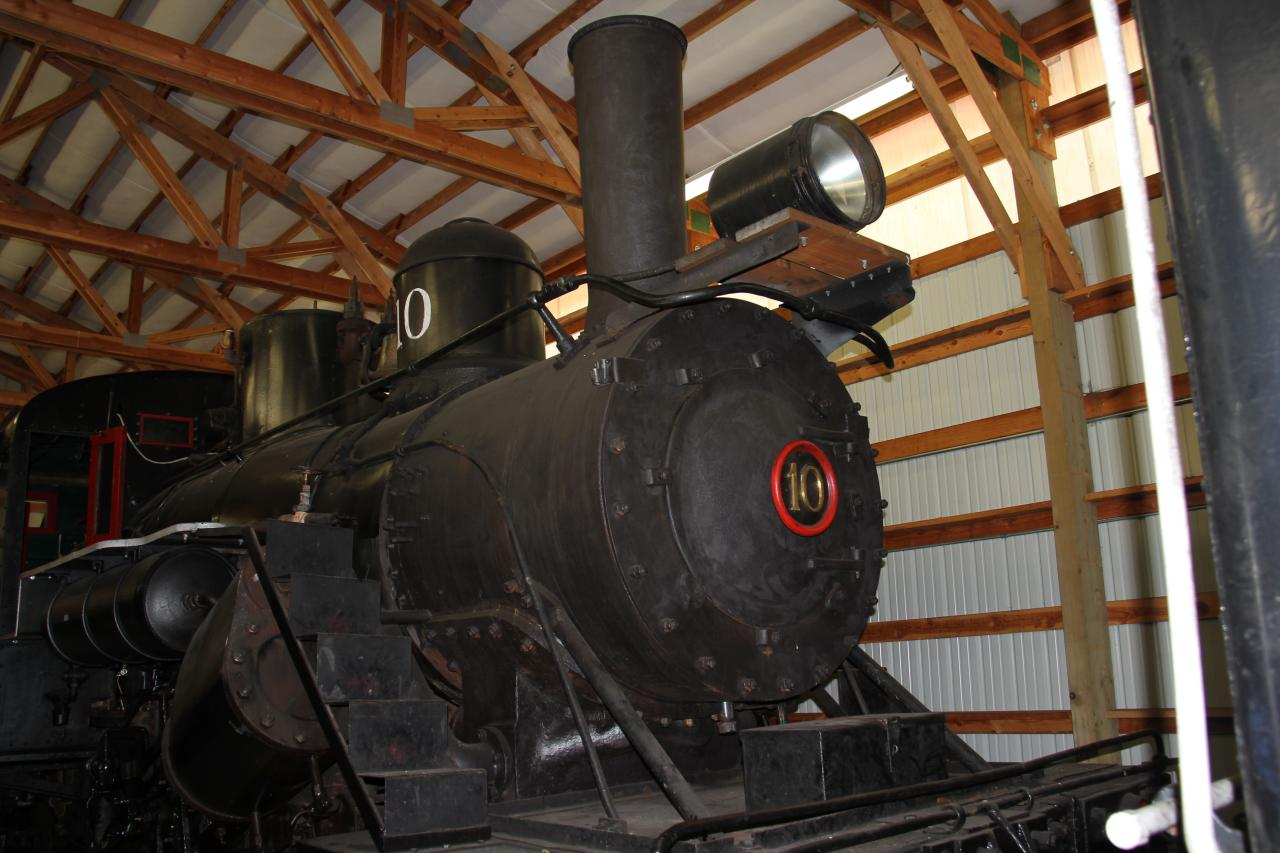
Hillcrest Climax no. 10 in July 2014

Built by the Climax Locomotive Works in 1928 for the Hillcrest Lumber Company in Vancouver Island, British Columbia as their #3. It was the second to last Climax engine ever built, and the last Climax engine built to standard gauge. #3 was at some point renumbered to #10, and operated for Hillcrest until 1968 when the mill shut down. At that time, it was the last Climax in the world in regular service. It was sold to a collector, Terry Ferguson, who first operated it near Lake Cowichan, BC for a couple years. Ferguson then operated it on the Victoria Pacific Railway in 1972 and 1973. That railway closed when the Canadian National Railway cancelled their lease, and Hillcrest 10 was sold to the MRSR to become their first operating steam locomotive in 1979. Stored inoperable.

=== Pickering Lumber Company no. 10 "R.J. 'Bud' Kelly", Heisler ===
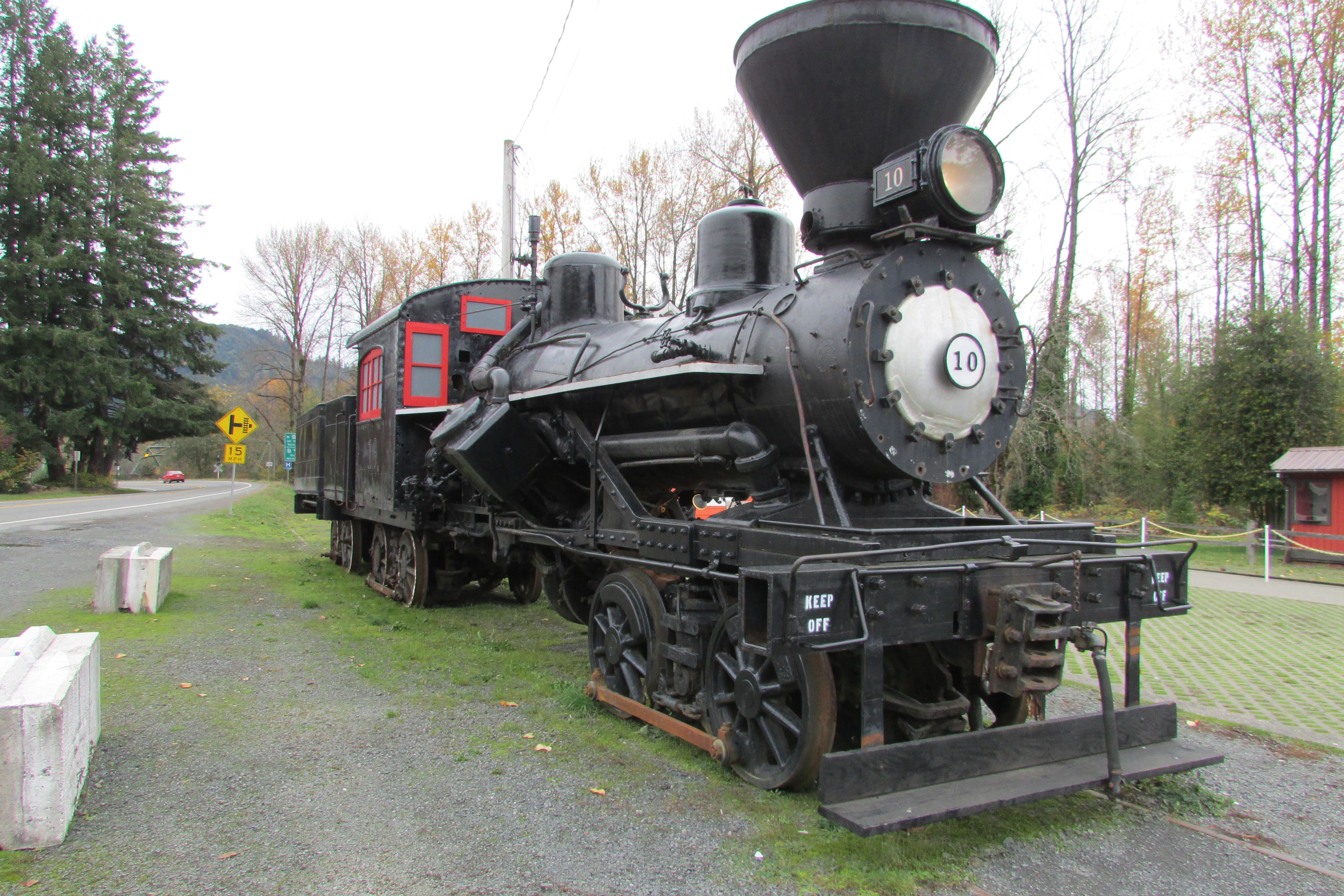
Pickering Heisler no. 10 on display next to the Elbe depot

Built in 1912 by Heisler for the Blue Jay Lumber Company as their no. 10 in West Virginia, and named "P. J. Lynch". It was sold to the Standard Lumber Company in 1922, which became the Pickering Lumber Company in 1926. It was sold to the Klamath & Hoppow Valley Railroad, where it operated for a few years in the seventies alongside Hammond Lumber Company #17. Both of these engines were later sold to the MRSR. The No. 10 Heisler was put on display by the Elbe depot, lettered for the Silver Creek Logging Company, and renamed "R.J. 'Bud' Kelly". On display.

=== Pickering Lumber Company no. 11, Pacific Coast Shay ===
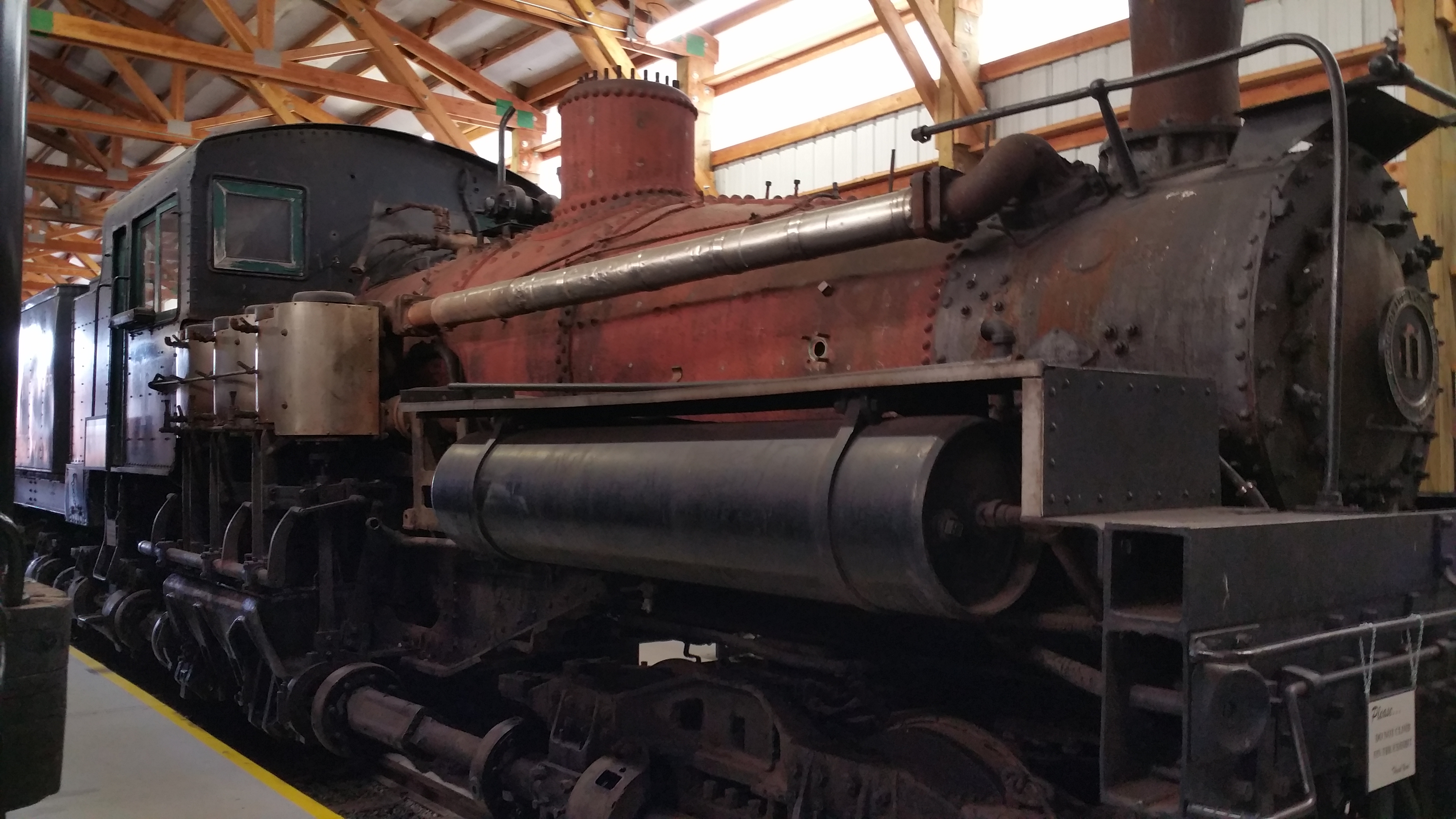
No. 11 laying partially dismantled in the "House of Gears"

No. 11 is a 90 ton 3-truck Shay, built in 1929 by Lima Locomotive Works for the Forest Lumber Company of Pine Ridge, Oregon as their #5. When the Forest Lumber Company shut down in 1940, it was sold to Pickering Lumber Corp. of Standard, California as their #11. It was badly burned in a roundhouse fire, and was planned to be scrapped, but was saved and rebuilt when the lumber market grew during WWII. In 1966, it was sold to Tom Irion in California, and operated at a railroad museum in Rio Vista, CA. In 1969 #11 was then sold to Gus Peterson, owner of the Klamath & Hoppow Valley Railroad, but never ran there. It was then sold to MRSR in about 1980, where it is one of only five surviving "Pacific Coast" Shay engines. It was returned to service in 1993. Stored inoperable.

=== MRSR no. 91, West Coast Special Heisler ===
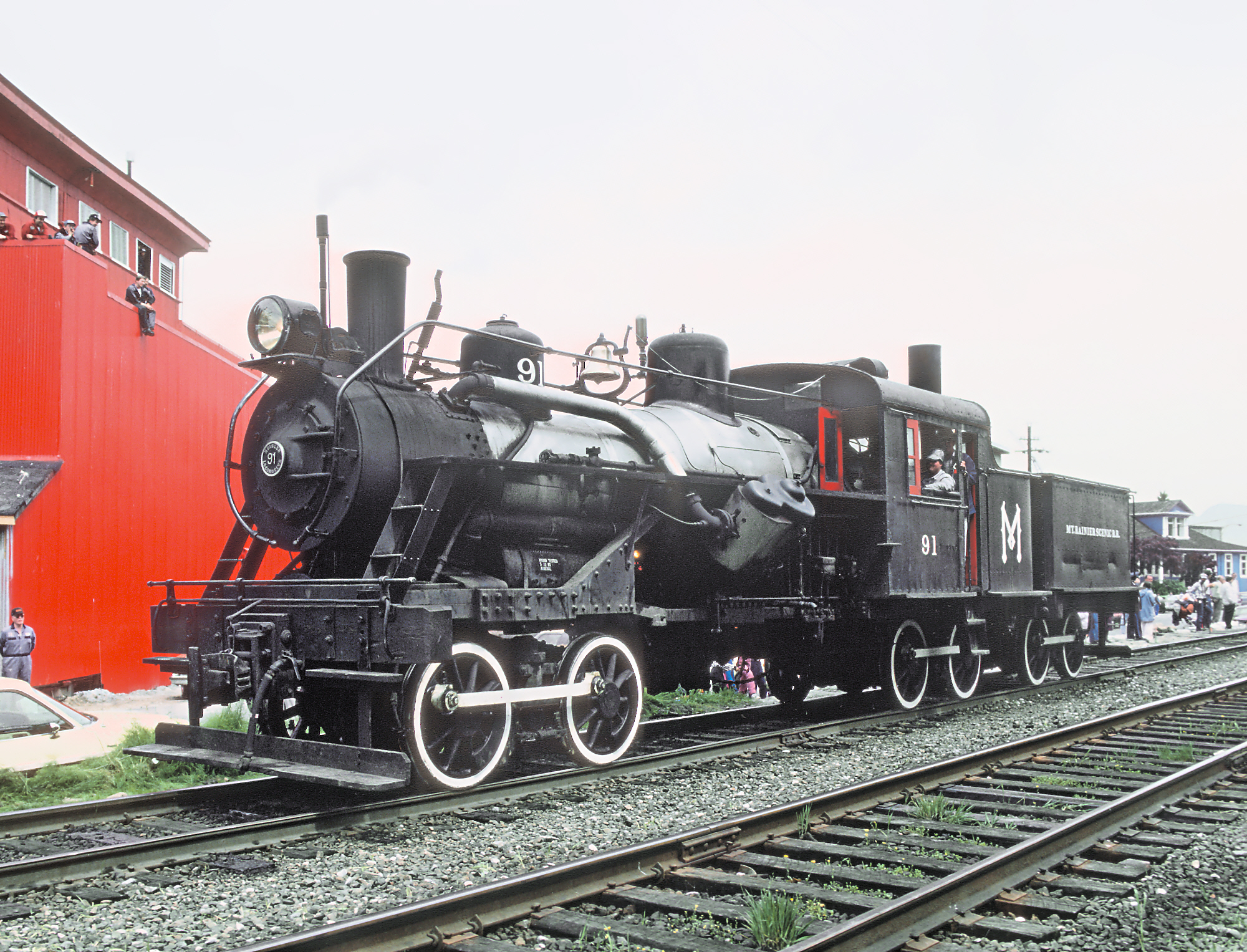
No. 91 under steam at Expo 86

Built in 1929 by the Heisler Locomotive Works for Whitney Engineering Co., a locomotive dealer at the time out of Tacoma, WA. It was sold to Kinzua Pine Mills of Kinzua, Oregon in 1930 and numbered 102. When Kinzua switched to diesel power, they kept #102 as a backup. In the 1960s, it was sold to the Vernonia South Park & Sunset tourist railroad, although it never ran there. After being displayed at a machine shop in Woodland, WA for a few years, it was sold to Tom Murray in the late 1970s, who donated it to MRSR where it became the railroad's second engine after Climax no. 10. #102 was renumbered by MRSR to #91 in honor of another #91 3-truck Heisler locomotive that formerly ran out of Mineral for the West Fork Logging Company. Stored inoperable.

== Diesel-electric locomotives ==
=== MRSR no. 41, Alco RSD-1 ===
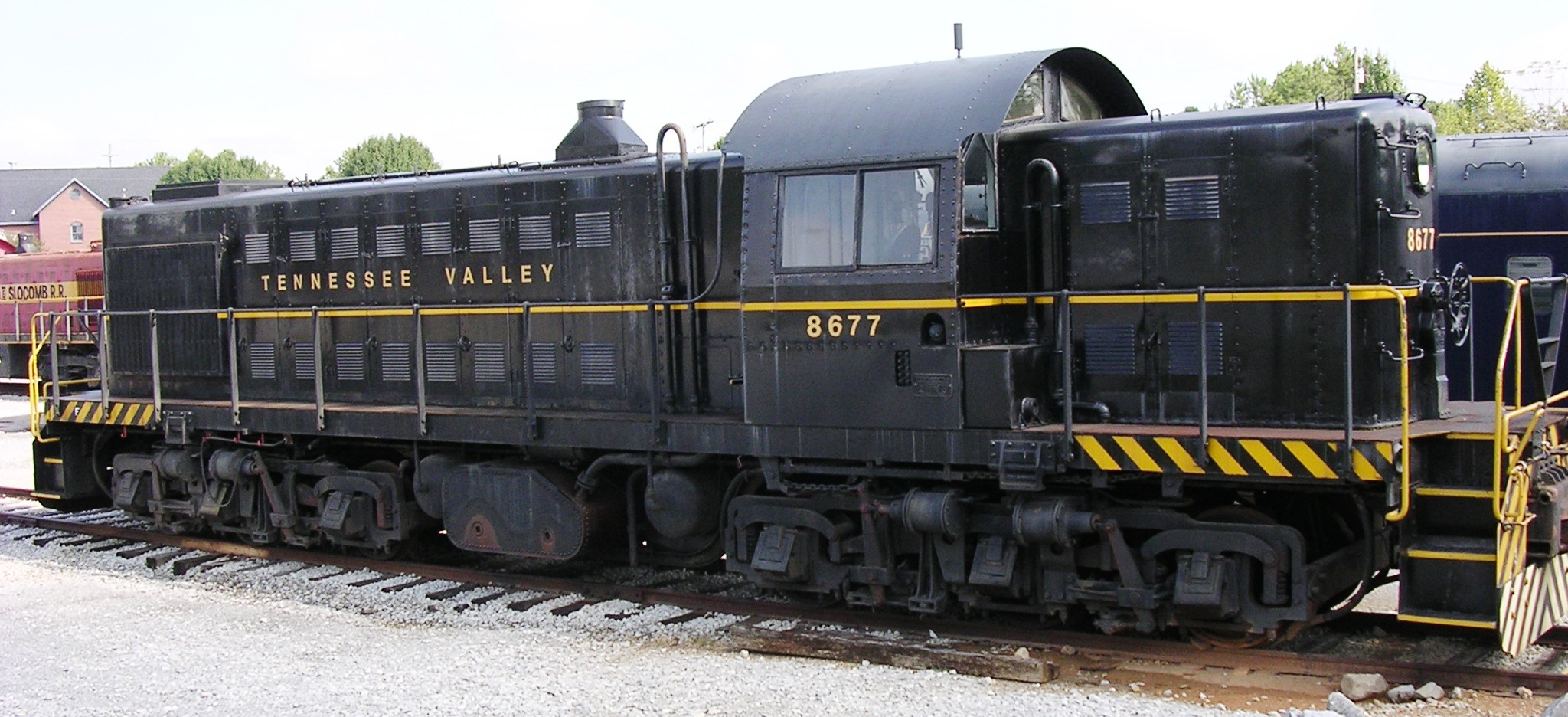
Tennessee Valley 8677, a similar RSD-1 to MRSR 41

Originally an Alco RS-1, built for the Chicago, Rock Island and Pacific Railroad as their #747. It, along with the rest of the first thirteen RS-1's, were requisitioned by the US Army in 1941, rebuilt into RSD-1's, and used on the Trans-Iranian Railway during WWII, where they renumbered this engine to #8004. After the war was over, #8004 came back to the US, and was leased to the Alaska Railroad in 1951 to become their #1041. In 1956, it returned to the continental US to become USAX 8004, then went to the USDOT to become their #8025. It was then transferred to the FRA to become their #011, before ending up at the MRSR to become their #41 (presumably taking the last two digits of its Alaska Railroad number). In 1989, it was seen operating on the Lake Whatcom Railway. Stored inoperable.

=== MRSR no. 481, EMD NW2 ===
An EMD NW2 with the serial number 1713, built by EMD for the Great Northern Railway in 1942 as their #5336. GN shortly renumbered it to #136 in 1943. It survived the Burlington Northern merger, and at some point became #481. It was sold in 1982 to Pacific Transportation Services, where it became their #103. They in turn sold it to Cargill c. 1990, who renumbered the engine back to #481. They sold it to Louis Dreyfuss, who donated it to MRSR in 2001. Stored inoperable.

=== MRSR no. 7134, ALCO S-1 ===
An Alco S-1 with the serial number 69684, built for Johns Manville as their #1 in March 1942. Johns-Manville was contracted to operate the Kansas Army Ammunition Plant, where this switcher worked. At some point the US Army acquired the engine (presumably when acquiring the rest of the ammunition plant in 1945), and it was renumbered to #7134. As of 1992, it was in use in Fort Lewis. When acquired by the MRSR, it was originally renumbered to #42, but eventually was renumbered back to #7134. It is the current yard switcher and main backup power for the regular excursions operated during the year. Currently operable.

=== Northern Pacific Railway no. 7012A, EMD F9 ===
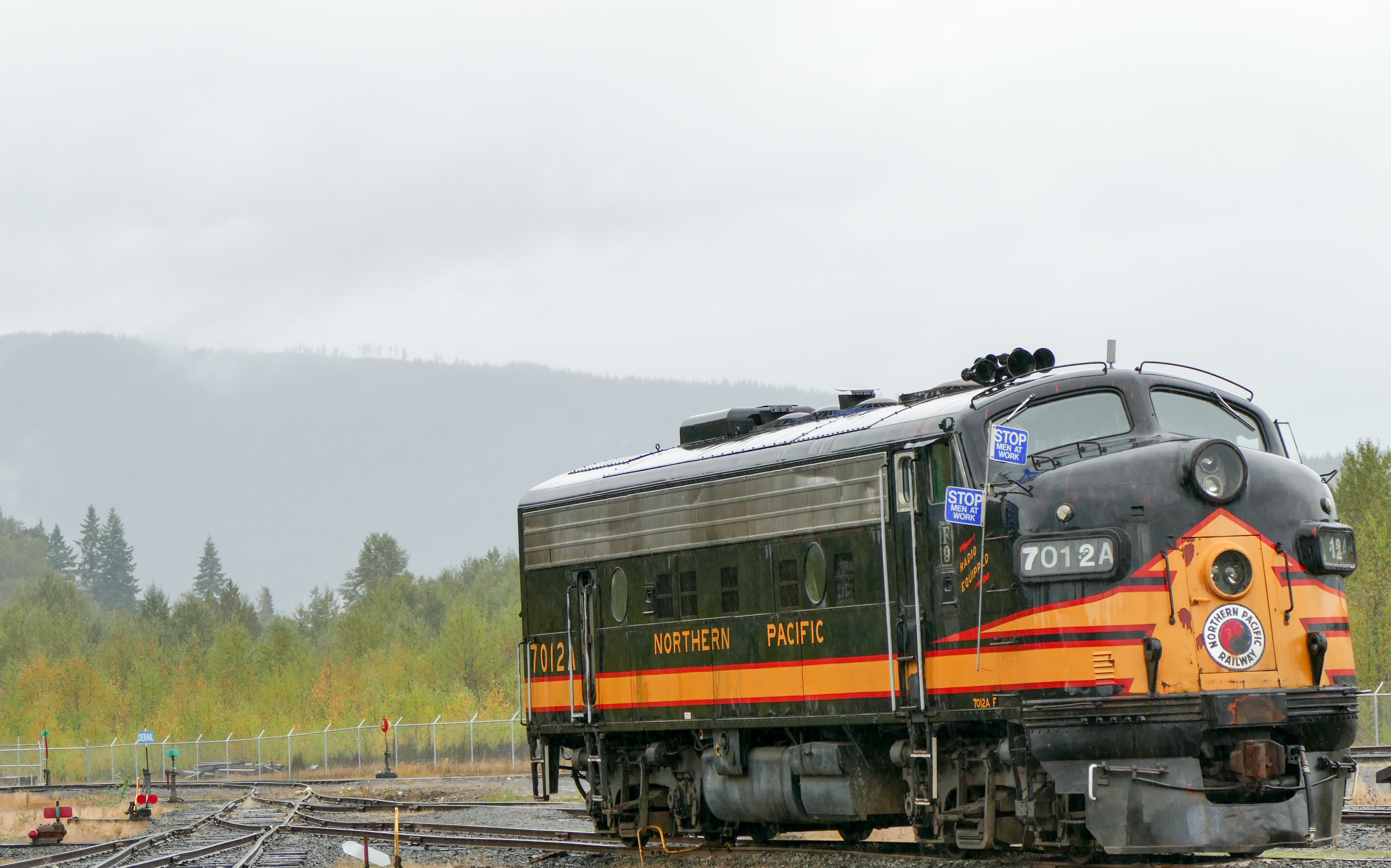
7012A in September 2017

An EMD F9, built by EMD for the Northern Pacific Railway in 1956. When the Northern Pacific was merged into the Burlington Northern in 1970, it retained its original paint and number, but eventually in 1978 was repainted into BN paint and renumbered 838. In 1980, the BN shops in Livingston, MT restored the NP paint and gave it its old number, after which it was donated to the MRSR. 7012A was rented from the MRSR for the 1985 movie Runaway Train. It was used by the railroad for extra power and ease of operation for their more complex excursions and events. In early 2026 it was reported that it no longer ran due to electrical issues. Stored inoperable.

== Former steam locomotives ==
=== Santa Cruz Portland Cement Company no. 2, Porter 0-4-0T "The Chiggen" ===
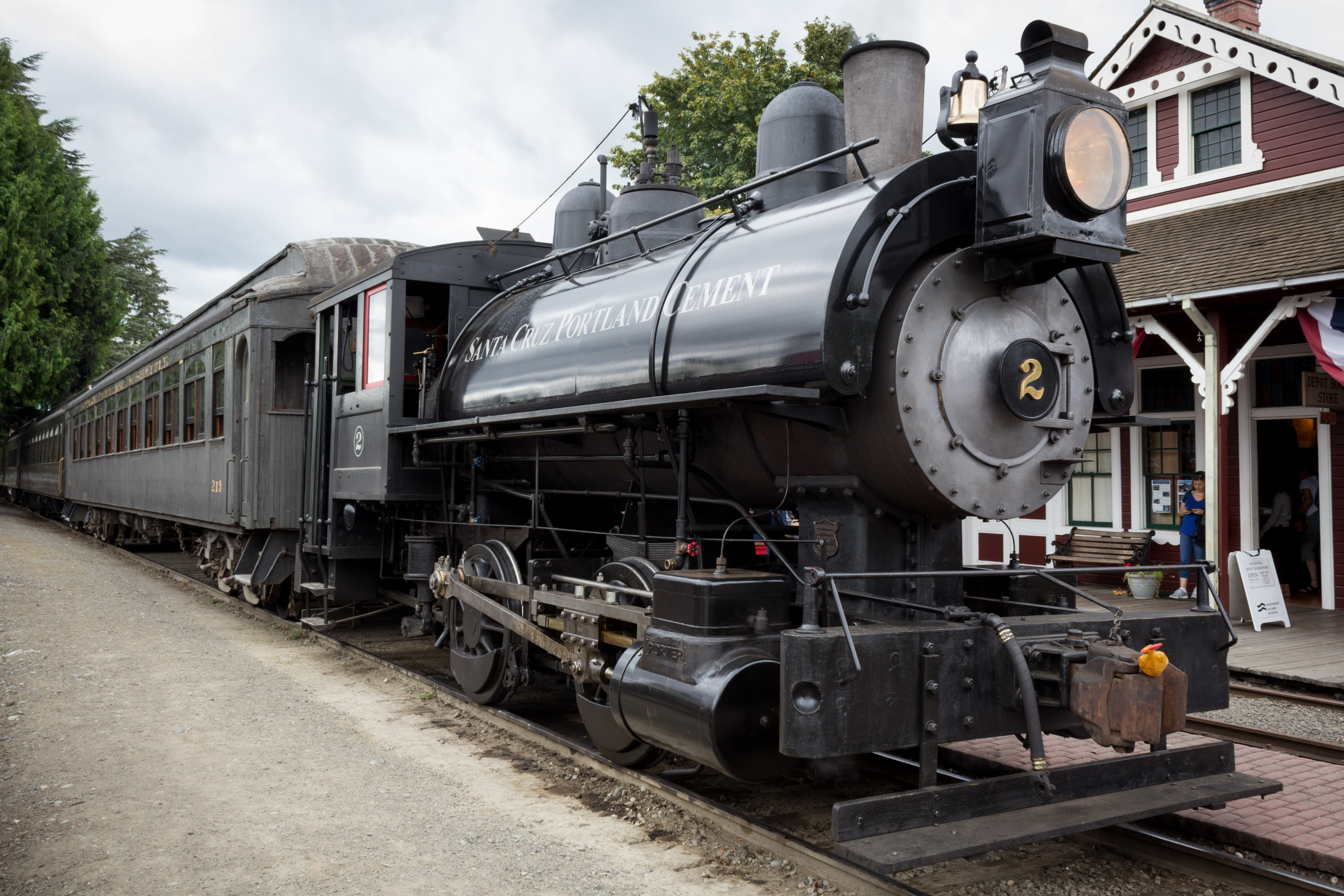
"The Chiggen" in 2016 at the Northwest Railway Museum

Built in 1909 by H.K. Porter for Santa Cruz Portland Cement Company as their #2. It was sold in 1924 to the Bechtel Kaiser Rock Company. It was eventually sold and ended up at the Chicken Kitchen restaurant in Stockton, California, giving the locomotive the nickname "The Chiggen". In 2006 it was sold to Stathi Pappas, and was later moved to the MRSR where it was restored. In 2013, it became operational, and has run on various tourist railroads since. Currently operable.

=== Port of Olympia #2, Baldwin 2-6-2T ===
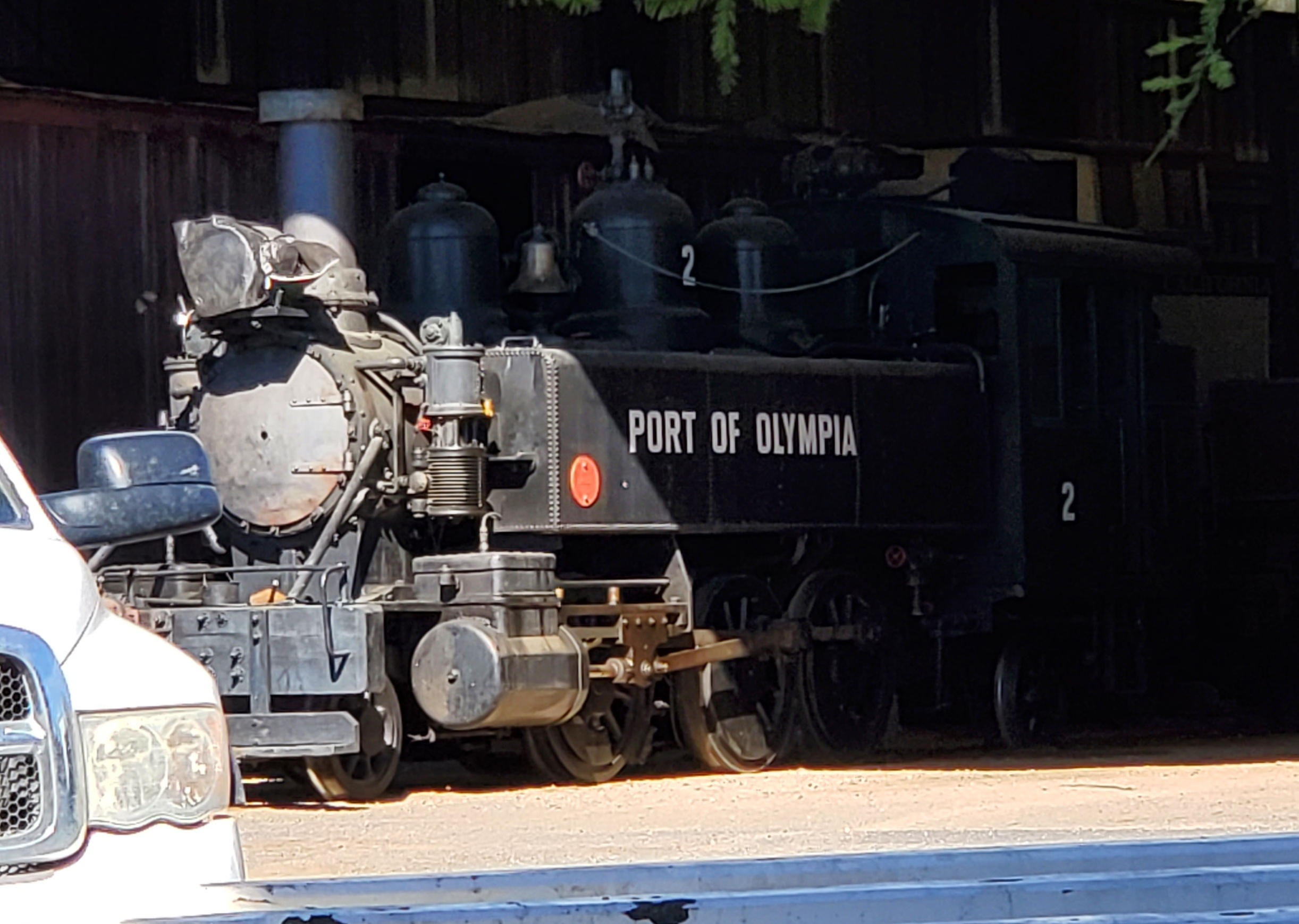
PoO #2 at the Roots of Motive Power museum in 2023

Built in 1910 by Baldwin Locomotive Works as the #7 for the Black Hills and Northwestern Railroad near Olympia, Washington, which was owned by the Mason County Logging Company. In 1928, it was no longer needed, and was sold to the Port of Olympia as their #2. In 1956, it was sold to Charles Morrow of the Puget Sound Railway Historical Association (the future Northwest Railway Museum). In 1988, it was sold to Chris Baldo of the Roots of Motive Power museum in Willits, California. In 1999 Baldo brought the engine to the MRSR, where #7 was fully rebuilt, repainted to its original livery, and returned to operation on July 1, 2001, after which it returned to Willits. At some point in the 2010s, it was repainted to its old Port of Olympia scheme and renumbered #2. Currently operable.

=== Columbia River Belt Line no. 7, Baldwin 2-4-4-2 "Skookum" ===
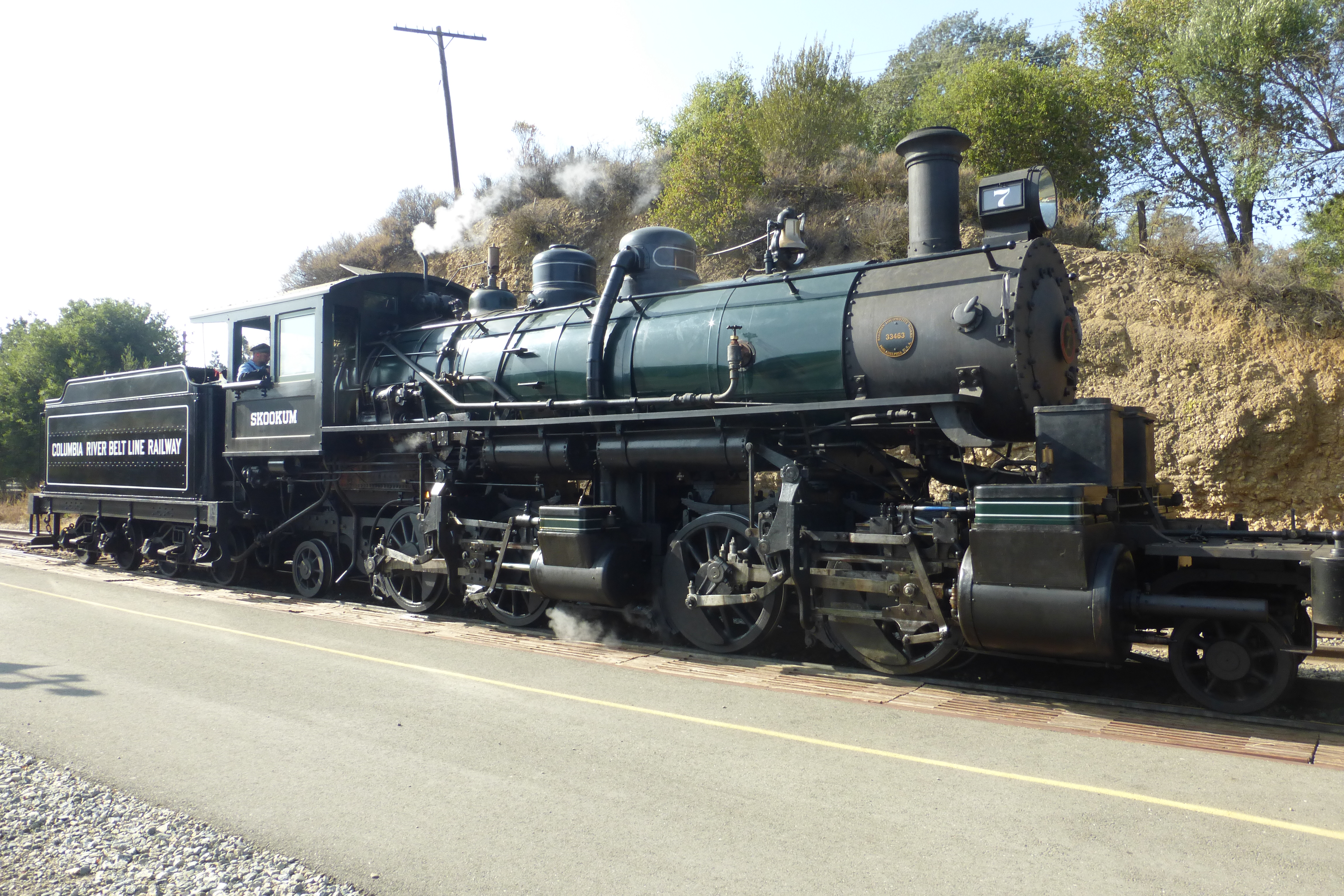
"Skookum" in 2020 on the Niles Canyon Railway

From the 1990s to 2005, while Skookum was owned by Rohan Coombs, it was stored at the MRSR shops for a possible restoration and operation. These plans fell through and the locomotive was sold to Chris Baldo, who brought the engine to the Oregon Coast Scenic Railroad in Garibaldi, Oregon for restoration. That restoration was completed in 2018, and in April 2019 the engine was transported to the Niles Canyon Railway, where it is today. Currently operable.

=== Polson Logging Company no. 45, Baldwin 2-6-2 ===
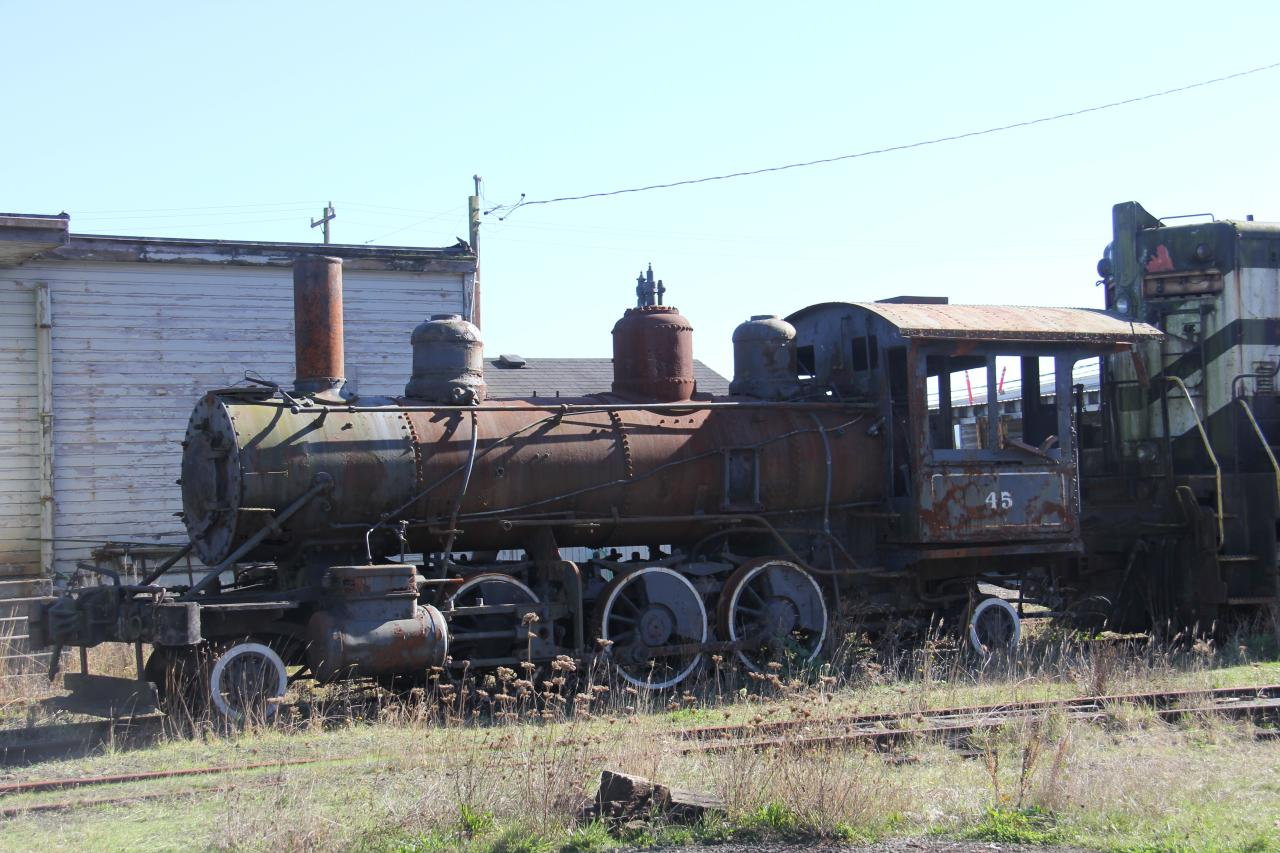
Polson #45 in 2014 at the Port of Tillamook Bay railyard next to the Tillamook Air Museum

Built by the Baldwin Locomotive Works (then known as Burnham, Williams & Co.) in 1906 for the Polson Brothers Logging Company, which was acquired by Rayonier in 1945. In 1961, Rayonier sold the engine to the City of Hoquiam, Washington, who put it on display in Last Spur Park. In 1998, the engine was bought by the MRSR for a possible restoration, but this never occurred. Chris Baldo bought the engine in 2010, and in 2012 it was moved to the Oregon Coast Scenic Railroad's shops in Tillamook, Oregon. The Polson Museum bought the engine in 2015, and continues the restoration efforts. Under restoration.

=== Northern Pacific no. 1364, Baldwin 4-6-0 ===
Built in 1902 by the Baldwin Locomotive Works for the Northern Pacific as their #1364. 1364 is a NP class S-4 locomotive; a ten wheeler, and originally Vauclain compound. They were very efficient, but maintenance costs forced NP to convert them to simple 2 cylinder engines in 1924. In 1927, superheaters were added. It worked in Washington state for many years until on January 1, 1954, it was retired, given a new paint job, and donated to the City of Tacoma who displayed it at Point Defiance. In the 1960s, a 14-year-old Jack Anderson contacted the Tacoma City Parks about giving the locomotive a cosmetic restoration. When this was done, the focus turned torwards getting the engine operational again, and in 1974 the engine was moved to a siding in Nalley Valley in Tacoma. This proved difficult; in 1979, the lease on the track ran out, and 1364 was moved out to the Tacoma tide flats into salty air. In 1985, it was moved to the MRSR's shops in Mineral, WA. In 1994, it was moved to the Northern Pacific Railway Museum in Toppenish, Washington, where the long process of restoration began. The restoration was finally completed in February of 2026, when it moved under its own power for the first time in 73 years. Currently operable.

== Former diesel locomotives ==
=== Department of Transportation no. 014, Alco RSD-1 ===
Along with the current RSD-1 #41, MRSR had another: DOT-014. It was built for the US Army as their #8016 in 1943. Like #41, it was also used on the Trans-Iranian Railway during WWII. Unlike #41, it did not go to Alaska. At some point it was given to the Department of Transportation and given the designation DOT-014. It was then sold to the MRSR sometime before 1988. Presumed scrapped.

=== MRSR no. 9120, EMD "GP10" ===
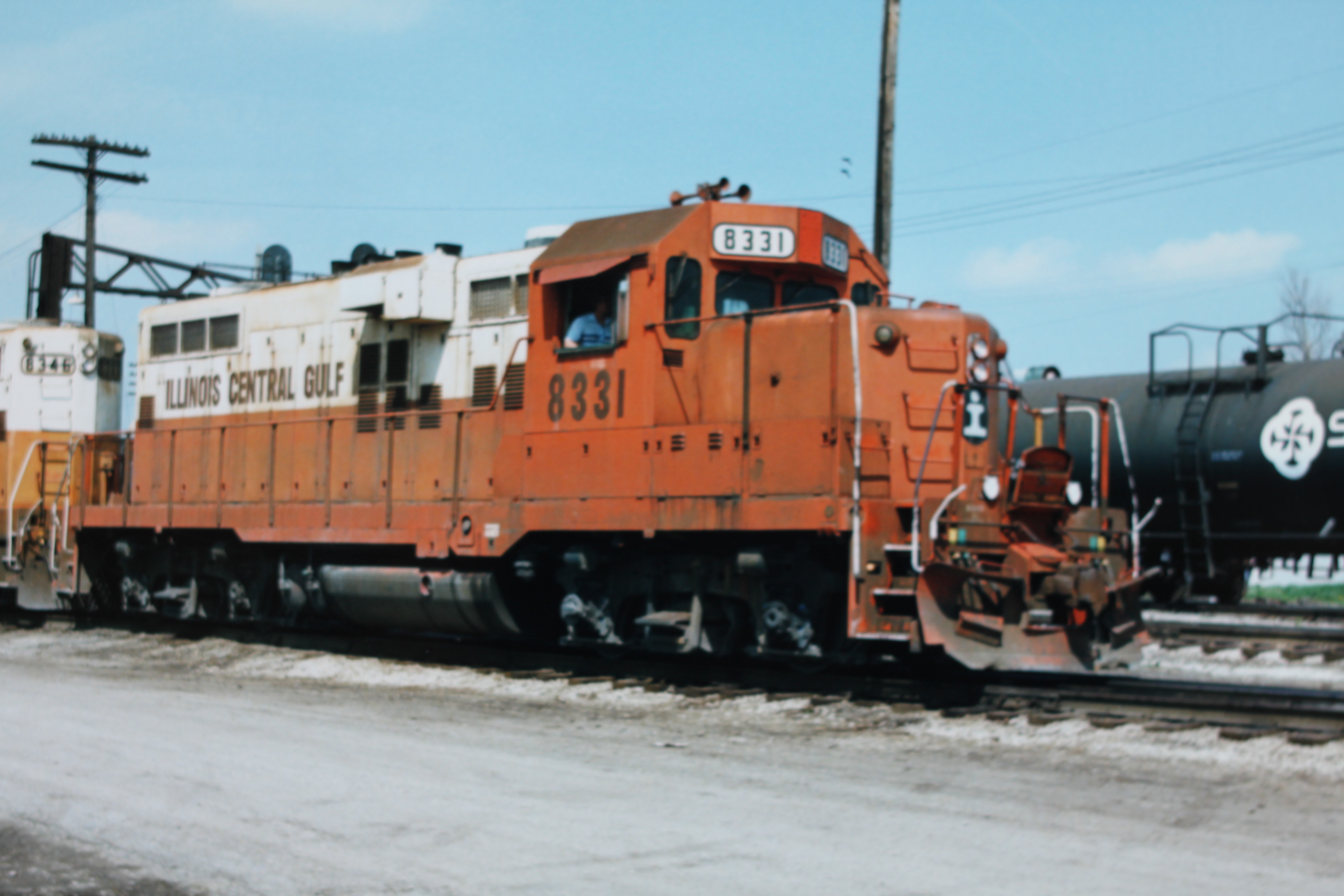
Illinois Central 8331, another "GP10" similar to 9120

An EMD GP9 with the serial number 20758, built by EMD in December 1955 for the Illinois Central as their #9120. In 1973, it was rebuilt by the IC into what they called a GP10 and renumbered to #8329. It was then sold to the US Army and became their #1873. The US Army used it for many years in Fort Lewis, until in 2017 it was sold. It was repainted to Milwaukee Road colors, renumbered back to #9120, and in 2018 was bought by American Heritage Railways (former owners of the MRSR). It was not used often, and was not included in the sale of equipment from AHR to WFIM. It left MRSR property in August 2024. 9120 was given the HRMX reporting mark (for Heritage Rail Management, a subsidiary of AHR), and was stored at the Abilene & Smoky Valley Railroad before being leased to the Branson Scenic Railway in 2025. Currently operable.
