= Patricia Whitefoot =

Indigenous elder, activist and professional educator

Patricia "Patsy" L. Whitefoot (born 1950) is a citizen of Yakama Nation, is Indigenous elder, activist and professional educator along with being the traditional food gatherer for the Toppenish Creek Longhouse. She served as the President of the National Indian Education Association and President Obama appointed her as a member of the National Advisory Council on Indian Education. She is a prominent advocate for Missing and Murdered Indigenous Women, and Indigenous rights.

== Early life and education ==
Patricia Whitefoot was raised by her maternal grandparents, Elias and Lillie Whitefoot, along with her five sisters, on the Yakama Indian Reservation in the southern part of Washington. Whitefoot grew up learning how to gather and prepare traditional foods and fished along the Columbia River. These activities connected her to the Yakama's traditional lands, natural resources, community, and culture.

After her grandmother became sick, Whitefoot and her sisters lived at the Yakima Indian Christian Mission, a reservation boarding school where she experienced “discrimination toward native students.” Her most vivid memories recall the girls who ran away from the school, and children needing to keep their escape plans secret. While attending, she rarely saw her grandparents outside of summer break. Her experience was similar to that of her grandmother, who went to Fort Simcoe boarding school, which engaged in practices of ethnocide. In her later life Whitefoot recognized how her grandmother's behaviors at times reflected the trauma of her experiences.

After graduating, Whitefoot earned both a Teacher’s Certificate and a Bachelors of Art degree in Education from Central Washington University. At her grandmothers urging, she went on to earn a Masters in Education from Fort Wright College.

== Career in education ==
Whitefoot is a professional educator who has served in many different capacities and positions. This has provided her with a vast array of experience and knowledge, the importance of which has been recognized by her many awards and positions. Her work also expands from the state of Washington as well, as she taught in Arizona on the Navajo Reservation. She served in a variety of roles such as principal, counselor, superintendent, and program director, as well as created multiple educational programs outside of these positions. Having worked at every level of Indian education, including as the Supervisor of Indian Education for Washington State, Whitefoot ensured Indigenous students were meeting academic needs as well as cultural and traditional understanding, and helping educators provide such learning. Whitefoot has been the Indian Education Director for the Toppenish School District on Yakama Reservation since 2004, supporting Indigenous students by coordinating partnerships with community stakeholders like Yakama Nation and other reservation school districts as well as the University of Washington. In the Toppenish School District, Whitefoot has increased preschool literacy readiness skills in Indigenous students and increased the number of Indigenous graduates attending postsecondary education. Whitefoot has also been on the Board of Directors for Heritage University, a private university in Toppenish, Washington on the Yakama Indian Reservation.

In 2015 and 2016 Whitefoot helped to research and publish two peer-reviewed journals with subjects on HIV and Chlamydia prevention, risks and screening in Indigenous populations.

Outside of her educational work, Whitefoot has served on the Yakama Nation Tribal Council, and also has been the Yakama Nation’s Department of Human Services Interim Director as well. She also served as a past President of the National Indian Education Association and the President of the Washington State Indian Education Association. Whitefoot is one of the founding members of the girls Iksiks Washanal’a (“The Little Swans”) dance group in Yakama Nation. This dance group creates dances based on oral interpretations of Yakama dance, and they have traveled nationally, wearing red to honor Missing and Murdered Indigenous Women (MMIW).

Whitefoot is now retired, but continues to her work surrounding MMIW and Indigenous education and Indigenous rights, and is a proponent for the Future Native Teachers Initiative, an organization that connects education systems with tribes in Washington to help Indigenous students explore careers in education and teaching.

== Advocacy work ==
=== Advocate for Missing and Murdered Indigenous Women ===
In 1987 Whitefoot's younger sister, 29-year-old Daisy May Heath, was reported missing. Whitefoot was close with her sister, who helped raise Whitefoot's children while she attended college. Whitefoot was working at the Washington state superintendent's office in Olympia at the time of her sister's disappearance. Daisy was declared legally dead several years after she went missing, and the FBI has described her disappearance as a suspected homicide.

The disappearance of Whitefoot's sister compelled her to advocate for MMIW in addition to her advocacy work with Indigenous education. Whitefoot has been foundational in calling attention to the MMIW crisis, with the chief research officer of the Seattle Indian Health Board calling her work and passion "instrumental" to the movement locally. As the MMIW crisis gained more widespread attention, Whitefoot began to be interviewed more frequently on the epidemic. In interviews, she typically focuses on current legislation surrounding MMIW, the need for more and better laws, the lack of national attention on the issue of MMIW, and how justice comes into play. She has met with many congressional representatives to discuss how the crisis affects Indigenous women and girls. In 2018, Whitefoot spoke at a Women are Sacred event created by the National Indigenous Women's Resource Center.

Whitefoot is the co-host of the War Cry Podcast, which is based in the Pacific Northwest and discusses missing and murdered Indigenous people, their stories, and the historical context surrounding them. In the spring of 2021l, Whitefoot was an invited panelist for an MMIW event put on by the Washington State Women's Commission.

Whitefoot's experiences and knowledge have been recognized by the state and federal governments. She spoke before the Washington State Legislature about Senate House Bill 2951, which would require the Washington State Patrol to look into MMIW cases within the state. The bill was passed in 2018, and the findings from it were published in the summer of 2019. The findings met with intense criticism about the thoroughness of the collection and analysis of data. In 2021, Washington State created a task force on the topic of missing Indigenous people and Whitefoot was appointed one of the twenty-three members. Whitefoot has also testified before the Oregon State Legislature in support of HB 2625, a bill that would require the Department of State Police to study MMIW and criminal justice resources and report on their findings.

=== Advocate for Indigenous Rights ===
Whitefoot is also an activist for Indigenous rights and tribal sovereignty. In 2020, she urged Washington state's Redistricting Commission to redraw district boundaries to reunite the Yakama Nation into one legislative district, as the previous fracturing of district boundaries had severed relationships between state representatives and tribal leaders and made it more difficult for Yakama Nation members to win elections. These impacts created barriers and difficulties for Yakama communities, as many who are not members of the Yakama Nation don't understand its history and the importance of the treaties that created the Yakama Reservation. In 2021, she advocated for the confrontation of boarding schools and what they did to Indigenous children, stating that they were “one part of that policy of assimilation or to exterminate us as a people.” She has been directly cited in multiple books, including a section in Yakama Rising, where her views on educating holistically, language revitalization, and protecting culture are discussed. In 2023, she was one of the featured voices in a National Geographic article on the ongoing impact of boarding schools, which also shared stories from Wanda Garnier (Lakota), Eugene Herrod (Muscogee), Viola Gala (Hualapai), George Johnson (Yup'ik), Dawn Neptune Adams (Penobscot), Willie Stevens (Interior Salish), Clarita Vargas (Colville), and Esther Nuqa'aq Green (Yup'ik).

Whitefoot has testified before the United States Congress multiple times as well, and her activism on a national level requires her to attend legislative briefings and hearings in Washington DC. In 2010, she testified before the United States Senate Committee on Indian Affairs based on the proposed tribal programs and initiatives budget. At the time, she was the President of the National Indian Education Association and asked for increased funding. In 2015, she testified again, advocating for better funding of Indigenous education, citing the differences in spending on non-Indigenous students versus Indigenous students. Whitefoot is currently a board member for the Confluence Project, focused on Indigenous connections to the Columbia River basin and ecosystem.

== Awards and recognition ==
Patsy Whitefoot has received numerous awards and recognitions from multiple organizations. Whitefoot's efforts to create culturally responsive education led the Potlatch Fund, a nonprofit that does work in Montana, Idaho, Washington, and Oregon to create the Patricia Whitefoot Education Award. She was awarded their Education Leadership Award in 2005, and since then this award and its name has been an homage to Whitefoot.

In 2009 Whitefoot was appointed by President Obama to the National Advisory Council on Indian Education, a council that works with the Secretary of Education on Indian Education issues that is made up of fifteen members all across the United States.

Whitefoot was also a 2009 Ecotrust Indigenous Leadership Award Finalist and was awarded 5,000 dollars. During the same time period, Whitefoot was appointed by Health and Human Services Secretary Kathleen Sebelius to the Substance Abuse and Mental Health Services Administration Prevention Committee.

In recent years, Whitefoot has been awarded both the Golden Tennis Shoe Award by Washington State Senator Patty Murray (2021) and the Adeline Garcia Community Service Awards from the Seattle Indian Health Board (2019). These awards highlight her work towards MMIW in Washington State and across the nation.

In the 2020 presidential election of the United States, Whitefoot was honored as an elector for the state of Washington. She used a ceremonial quill pen to cast a Washington Electoral College vote for Joe Biden.

== Personal life ==
Whitefoot continues to live on the Yakama Indian Reservation and has three children, ten grandchildren, and is a great-grandmother.
