= Iwao and Hanaye Matsushita =

Japanese American couple that was interned apart during World War Two

- Born: January 10, 1892 (Iwao); March 9, 1898 (Hanaye)
- Known for: Internment of Japanese Americans during World War II

Iwao and Hanaye Matsushita were a young Japanese American couple who were interned apart during the Internment of Japanese Americans during the 1940s. The couple are famous for writing hundreds of letters back and forth throughout the duration of the war. The story of the two lovers is a poignant reflection of the Japanese experience during World War II. Their forced separation by Executive Order 9066 reveals a correspondence that has allowed historians to understand the daily routines and feelings of those imprisoned. Their circumstances are a significant resource to academics studying Japanese-American history.

== Early life ==
=== Iwao Matsushita ===
Iwao Matsushita was born into a Methodist family where his religious upbringing provided access to Western ideas and culture. He was hired as a clerk at the Mitsui Company, a trading firm with home offices in Tokyo. He had frequent salary increases, however he submitted his resignation citing an undying desire to study English and English literature at University of Washington. Iwao had previously graduated from the University of Foreign Languages in Tokyo with a certificate to teach English.

=== Hanaye Matsushita ===
Hanaye was born on March 9 of 1898. She was an orphan who was given up at birth. When she was adopted, her family raised her in Christian faith. She spent her time in school studying in Tokyo at a Christian school.

=== Iwao and Hanaye Matsushita ===
Iwao and Hanaye married, and the pair crossed the Pacific and set up a life together in Seattle. They came over to America on S.S Suwa Maru. They set up businesses and schools in the late 1910s and throughout the 1920s. Iwao became involved in a Camera Club in Seattle. He grew close to Dr. Kyo Koike and the pair stayed in touch during Iwao's internment. With tensions rising between American and Japan, Iwao was placed on the ABC list for those known as dangerous. Some Japanese American informants said he was actually working for the Japanese Chamber of Commerce of Tokyo, however there is no evidence for or against this claim. After the first World War, the West Coast became a main shipping port in Seattle and businesses in Japantown boomed. However In 1918 when the economy suffered many blamed the Japanese for the decline when in reality it was because of the pause of shipbuilding towards the end of the war. Japanese Americans were seen as the reason that the economy was in decline and were blamed heavily. This led to hostility and eventually in 1924 Congress passed the Immigration Act. Japanese immigration was no longer allowed from Japan. In the 1930s with the luring second World War, trade with Japan across the pacific dwindled and so did the relationships the Issei had created in America.

== The Letters ==
On December 11, 1941, Iwao Matsushita wrote his first letter to Hanaye, documenting his arrival at Seattle's Immigration Station. He was then brought to Fort Missoula Incarceration Camp in Montana. His hearing took place at Fort Missoula where he demonstrated his loyalty and even those who questioned him called him "a man of education and of considerable intelligence". Shortly after, Hanaye Matsushita was taken to Minidoka Incarceration Camp in Idaho. The letters between Iwao and Hanaye Matsushita highlight the cruelty of the incarceration camps and the trauma caused by them. In the heartbreaking letters, Hanaye mentions thoughts of suicide due to an overwhelming sense of loneliness.

== Censorship ==
All the mail sent out from the camps was monitored. All mail went to the INS (United Immigration and Naturalization Service), and specialists opened the envelope to see if any suspicious activities were being reported in the letter. For example, no one was allowed say anything about life in the concentration camps. If so, the letter was either destroyed or sensitive words would be covered.

== Reunion ==
In August Iwao had another hearing that recommended his immediate release. His new status became internee of war. He then moved to Minidoka and the pair were finally reunited after three years apart. However Hanaye became very sick soon after. Her condition was a direct result of prolonged anxiety due to her uncertain future and separation from Iwao. Hanaye died soon after, providing a heartbreaking ending to an equally heartbreaking story. This tragic ending strikes a chord in the heart of anyone reading the Matsushita's story. Incarceration is such a horrible occurrence that it is impossible for anyone who has not experienced it to truly know what it feels like. Iwao and Hanaye's letters provide an avenue for readers to truly understand the inhumanity of the Japanese American incarceration.

== Louis Fiset's Imprisoned Apart: The World War II Correspondence of an Issei Couple ==
Louis Fiset's book published the hundreds of letters sent back and forth between Iwao and Hanaye Matsushita. Over a span of 40 years, Fiset has researched the impact of war on mail and censorship. His main focus was on World War II, specifically the censorship of communications during the war. Naturally, Iwao and Hanaye's story was of great interest to his research. His book is written for historians and those looking to reach a deeper understanding of the lives of Japanese Americans through the eyes of the interned. While there are countless resources about the internment camps, few are written by the Japanese Americans themselves. The Matsushita's never intended for their letters to become a critical part of history. They simply missed each other and wanted to stay in communication. Because of this, Fiset's book adds dimension to the story of Japanese Americans. By publishing the Matsushita's letters, Fiset's book is one of the most important resources in gaining an understanding of day-to-day life in the camps, while providing a story that readers and historians can connect to.

== Significance ==
Iwao and Hanaye Matsushita's situation is known in history because while both were locked up, the couple was continuously sending letters to each other. Iwao was imprisoned in Fort Missoula, Montana, while Hanaye was kept at Minidoka Relocation Center in Idaho. Their separation lasted three years, and over this period the couple used writing as a way to stay connected. Many other Japanese-American couples were also separated in the war. There exists no records of couples staying in contact, like in the case of the Matsushita's letters. One example is Midori Shimoda and Chizuko Yamashita Shimoda, another couple who survived incarceration. There are no records of communication existing between them. Iwao and Hanaye's letters have grown to represent more than just their relationship, but every relationship between couples split up during internment. While looking back at this time period, and specifically at families separated, attention is drawn to the case of Iwao and Hanaye. Their letters are edged in history, not only as evidence of the feelings and emotions felt by loved one's who were separated, but also for they described life as an incarceree. These letters dealt with the weather, wildlife, food, and daily activities all through a primary lens. Researchers use these letters today to understand life in the camp through the eyes of those who survived incarceration. Iwao and Hanaye's letters reveal the determination of the couple to not let their relationship be destroyed by imprisonment.
