= The Historical Museum at Fort Missoula =

Coordinates: 46.8438°N 114.0629°W

Formerly the Quartermaster’s Storehouse at Fort Missoula, this historic brick building now houses exhibits and the museum shop.

The Historical Museum at Fort Missoula was founded in 1975, at the site of the historic Fort Missoula in Missoula, Montana, US. The 32-acre park features an indoor museum with both permanent and rotating exhibits as well as an outdoor museum grounds. The outdoor grounds house historic equipment and buildings including a Willamette locomotive, historic streetcar, a wood-waste burner, homestead cabins, and structures related to the fort's history as an World War II internment camp.

== History ==
By 1948, following the end of World War II, the US Army had abandoned Fort Missoula and shuttered the Fort Missoula Internment Camp.

The Fort Missoula Historical Society was founded in the 1960s to preserve the fort's Non-Commissioned Officers Quarters building, which dated back to 1877. In 1972, the group sold this building to the Western Montana Ghost Town Preservation Society.

In December 1972, Missoula was granted roughly 30 acres of land from the Bureau of Outdoor Recreation to erect a public park. The historical society worked with the city to make the development into a historical park, with the old Quartermaster's Warehouse as an indoor museum.

After obtaining external donations, in both artifacts and money, work was able to begin on renovating the Quartermaster's Warehouse. The society also secured the museum funding through a tax levy, which by 1982 provided the museum with $65,000 annually.

The indoor museum, housed in the Quartermaster's Warehouse, was officially opened to the public on July 7th, 1974, and the museum's grounds opened in 1975. In 1984, the museum's name was changed from "Fort Missoula Historical Museum" to the "Historical Museum at Fort Missoula."
