= Toppenish High School =

Coordinates: 46°22′53″N 120°20′03″W

Location
- 141 Ward Road; Toppenish, Washington 98948; United States

Information
- Type: High School
- School district: Toppenish School District
- Principal: Cyndy Valdez
- Staff: 50.55 (FTE)
- Grades: 9–12
- Enrollment: 988 (2023–2024)
- Student to teacher ratio: 19.55
- Colors: Cardinal, Black, Gray & White
- Mascot: Wildcats
- Website: https://ths.toppenish.wednet.edu/

Toppenish High School (Top-Hi) is a public high school in Toppenish, Washington. It is a part of the Toppenish School District in Yakima County.

== Demographics ==
In October 2019 the student population was identified as 86.8% Hispanic, 9.9% American Indian/Alaska Native, 2.2% White and 1.1% other. 97.9% of students graduated in four years.

== Awards ==
The school earned a silver medal in U.S. News & World Report's annual ranking of American high schools in 2008. Additional awards followed, making the high school the most decorated in Washington State during a five-year period.

- 2010 Recipient of a Washington Achievement Award (Language Arts)
- 2011 Engineering Program nationally certified
- 2011 Recipient of Washington Achievement Awards in four areas (Excellence, Language Arts, Extended Graduation Rate, and Improvement)
- 2012 Washington State STEM Lighthouse School
- 2012 KCTS 9 Stanley O. McNaughton Golden Apple Award for Excellence in Education
- 2013 Recipient of a Washington Achievement Award (High Progress)
- 2013 KCTS 9 (Seattle) Golden Apple “Pathways to Excellence” School

== Sports ==
Toppenish High School plays in the Central Washington Athletic Conference (CWAC) as a size 2A school. Sports offered include football, golf, volleyball, basketball, soccer, wrestling, track and field, swimming, and tennis.

Toppenish is well known for their extremely successful wrestling program. The boys wrestling team has taken home state championships in 1991, 1993, 1998 (2A), 2016 (2A), 2017 (2A), 2019 (2A), 2020 (2A), 2022 (1A), 2023 (1A) and 2024 (1A).

== Scandals ==
Toppenish High School has had legal reports in the past involving allegations of teachers committing heinous acts with Students. Johnny and Bertha Cerna were both staff members as part of Toppenish High School and Toppenish School District. Both were accused of providing alcohol and having sexual relations with students. The teachers have been fired in early 2022. Johnny Cerna lost his teaching licence in 2023. Bertha Cerna passed in mid 2023.
