= Willamette locomotive =

Geared steam locomotive

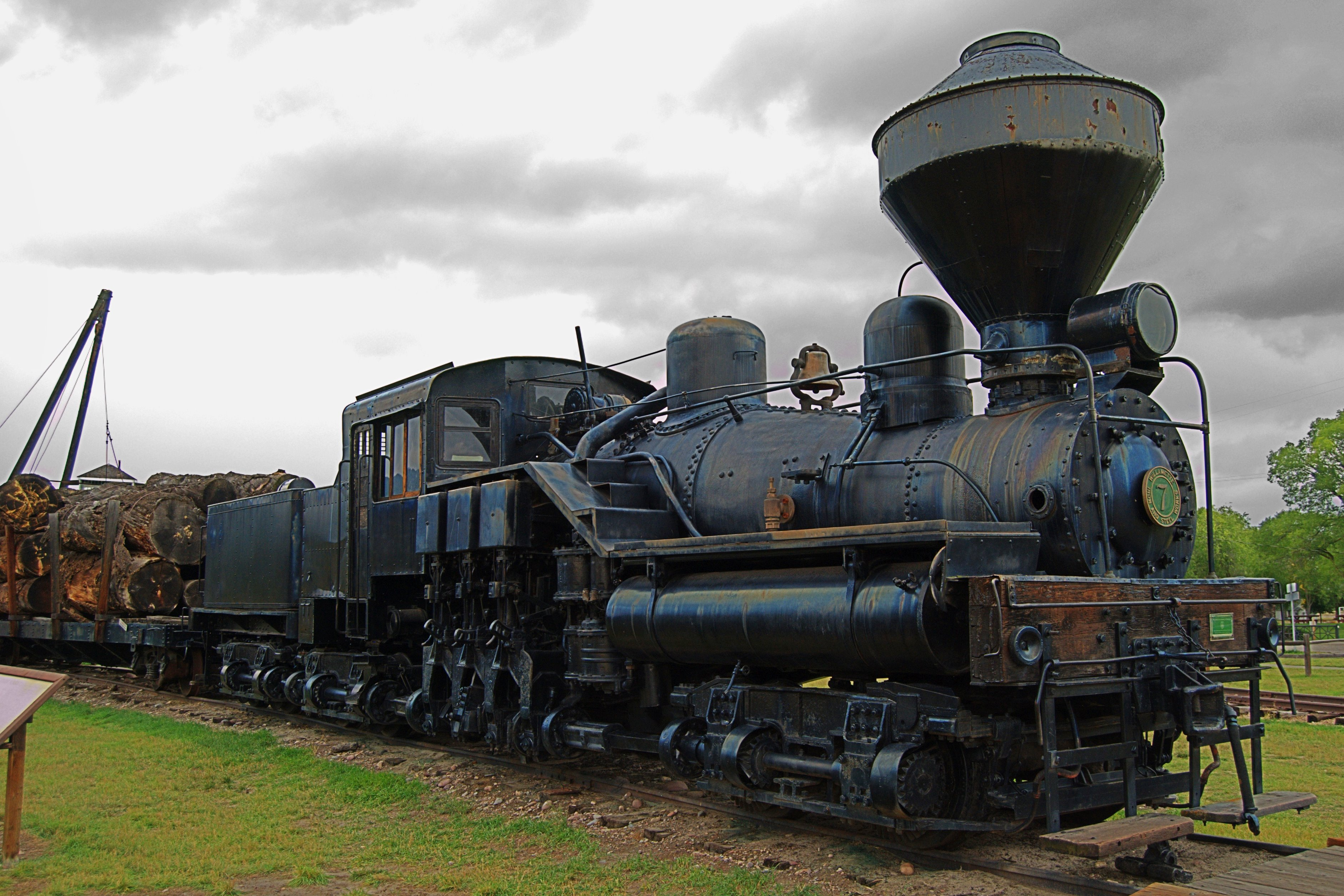
Willamette Locomotive no. 7, on static display at the Fort Missoula Museum.

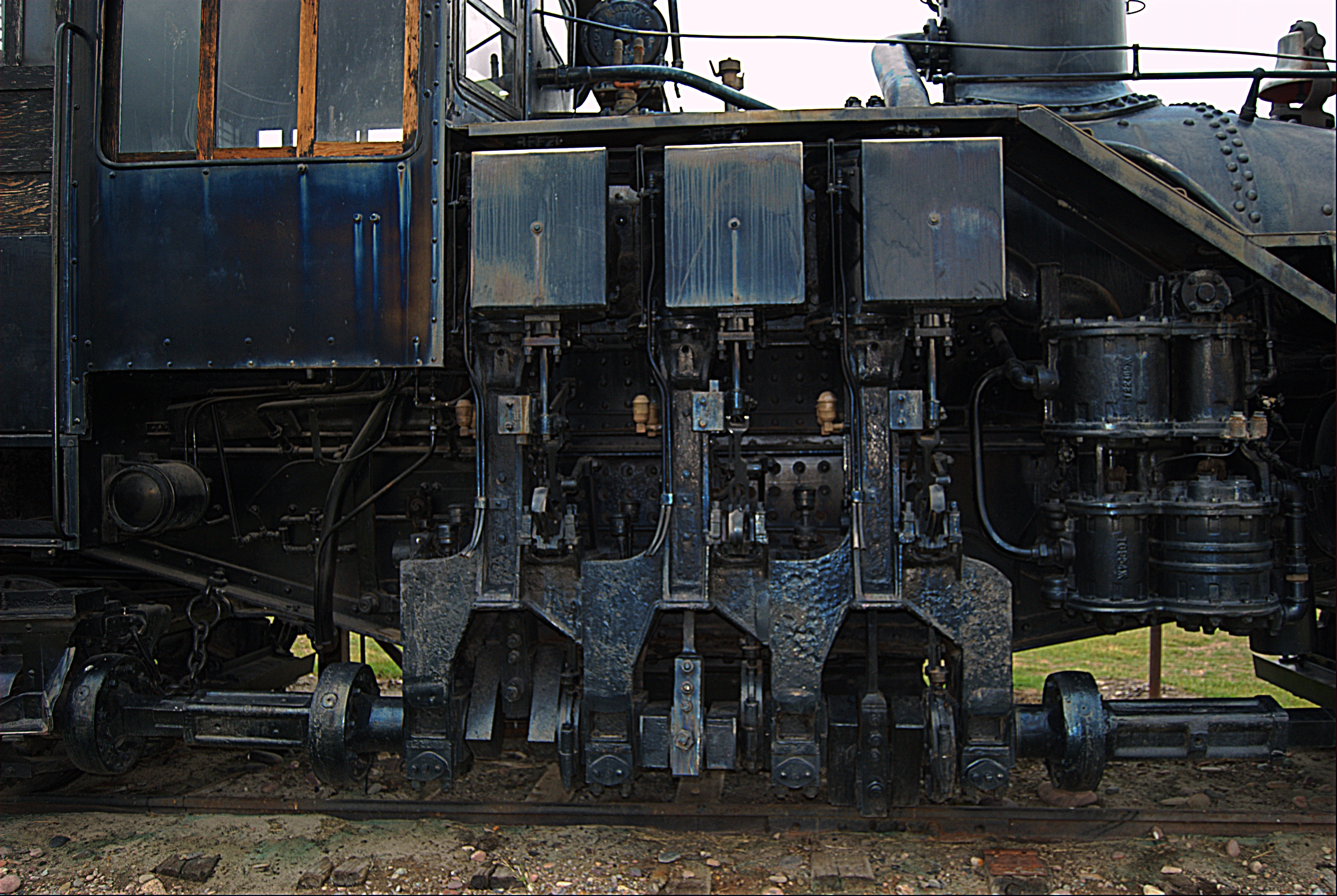
Cylinder detail of a Willamette locomotive

The Willamette locomotive was a geared steam locomotive of the Shay locomotive type, built by the Willamette Iron and Steel Works of Portland, Oregon. After key patents on the Shay locomotive had expired, it was possible for other manufacturers to produce Shay-like locomotive designs.

== History ==
Willamette Iron and Steel Works in Portland, Oregon, was well established in the Pacific Northwest, as a logging operations supplier, when they expanded into locomotive building. Their design of the Willamette locomotives, was focused on logging, incorporating all of the modern (in 1922) aspects of a Shay locomotive and the standard features most requested by western loggers; steel cabs, girder frame, cast trucks, air brakes, electric headlamps. The unique features of the locomotive were patented in 1923 (patent No. 1,464,696) by Albert Claypoole, an engineer with Willamette Iron and Steel Works. All Willamette locos were Standard gauge, 56½". A total of 33 were built in Portland Oregon, between Nov. 1922 and Dec. 1929; 1 ordered and cancelled in 1927.

Three class sizes were built:

(50-2) 50-ton, 2-truck, with Three 11 inch x 13 inch cylinders, 2 built, 1 cancelled.

(70-3) 70-ton, 3-truck, with Three 12 inch x 15 inch cylinders, 27 built.

(75-3) 75-ton, 3-truck, with Three 12½ inch x 15 inch cylinders, 4 built.

Designed and introduced in late 1922, the high point in production was 1923, when 11 were built and shipped. By 1929, only one, the last one, was built.

The Willamette locomotive was very similar to a Shay, but had many differences, as the company that made them intended on making an "improved Shay", even though the "Pacific Coast Shay", later made by Lima, took up many of the features of the Willamette. The differences were:

- Most Willamettes were equipped with superheaters, while Shays usually were not.
- The boiler parts were riveted together, instead of being bolted together.
- The Willamette locomotive used Walschaerts valve gear driving piston valves, while the Shay mainly used Stephenson valve gear driving slide valves.
- The truck design was completely redone and rode much smoother.
- The rear cylinder on the Willamette was facing the same direction as the rest of the cylinders, while the two front cylinders on a Shay faced forward, with the rear cylinder facing backwards.
- The back cylinder on a Willamette was moved forward of the cab, while in a Shay, the back cylinder was almost protruding into the cab.
- The valve chests were all turned outward, making all three cylinders essentially identical.
- In a test done between a Shay and a Willamette, the Shay pulled 27 empty cars, while the Willamette pulled 29 empty cars, as well as using 40% less fuel.

All but one Willamette burned oil, despite their working for logging companies, where wood would be abundant. Oil burners produced few sparks, however, and were less likely to ignite a forest than coal- or wood-fired locomotives. The only coal-fired Willamette worked for Anaconda Copper.

== Preservation ==
Six Willamette locomotives survive.

- Locomotive (Construction No. 34) Rayonier No. 2 was operational at the Mt. Rainier Scenic Railroad in Mineral, Washington, until the railroad shut down operations in 2020, but the line was later revived in 2023.
- Willamette Locomotive (Construction No. 7) Anaconda Copper and Mining No. 7 is undergoing restoration at The Historical Museum at Fort Missoula in Missoula, Montana.
- Willamette Locomotive (Construction No. 21) Medford No. 7 is on display and can be viewed at Railroad Park Resort in Dunsmuir, California.
- Willamette 1924-built (Construction No. 16) Locomotive Rayonier No. 4 is on display in Port Angeles, Washington and being cosmetically restored. As of 2023, the lead community organization for the project is the North Olympic Peninsula Railroaders, a local charitable organization dedicated to railroad history.
- Crown-Zellerbach No. 6 Willamette (Construction No. 13) is on display in Cathlamet, Washington.
- Medford No. 4 (Construction No. 18) is being restored to operation by the Southern Oregon Railway Historical Society in Medford, Oregon

== In popular culture ==
A Willamette locomotive, filmed on location in Washington, features prominently in the action sequences of the 1937 Warner Brothers film God's Country and the Woman, with the film's logging industry plot.
