= Yakama Nation Tribal School =

Coordinates: 46°22′40″N 120°19′46″W

The Yakama Nation Tribal School is a public tribal high school located in Yakima County, Washington, adjacent to Toppenish, run by the Yakima Nation. It is affiliated with the Bureau of Indian Education (BIE).

It has a compact with the state of Washington and receives a grant from the BIE.
