= Fort Missoula =

Coordinates: 46°50′34″N 114°03′29″W

- Fort Missoula Historic District
- U.S. National Register of Historic Places
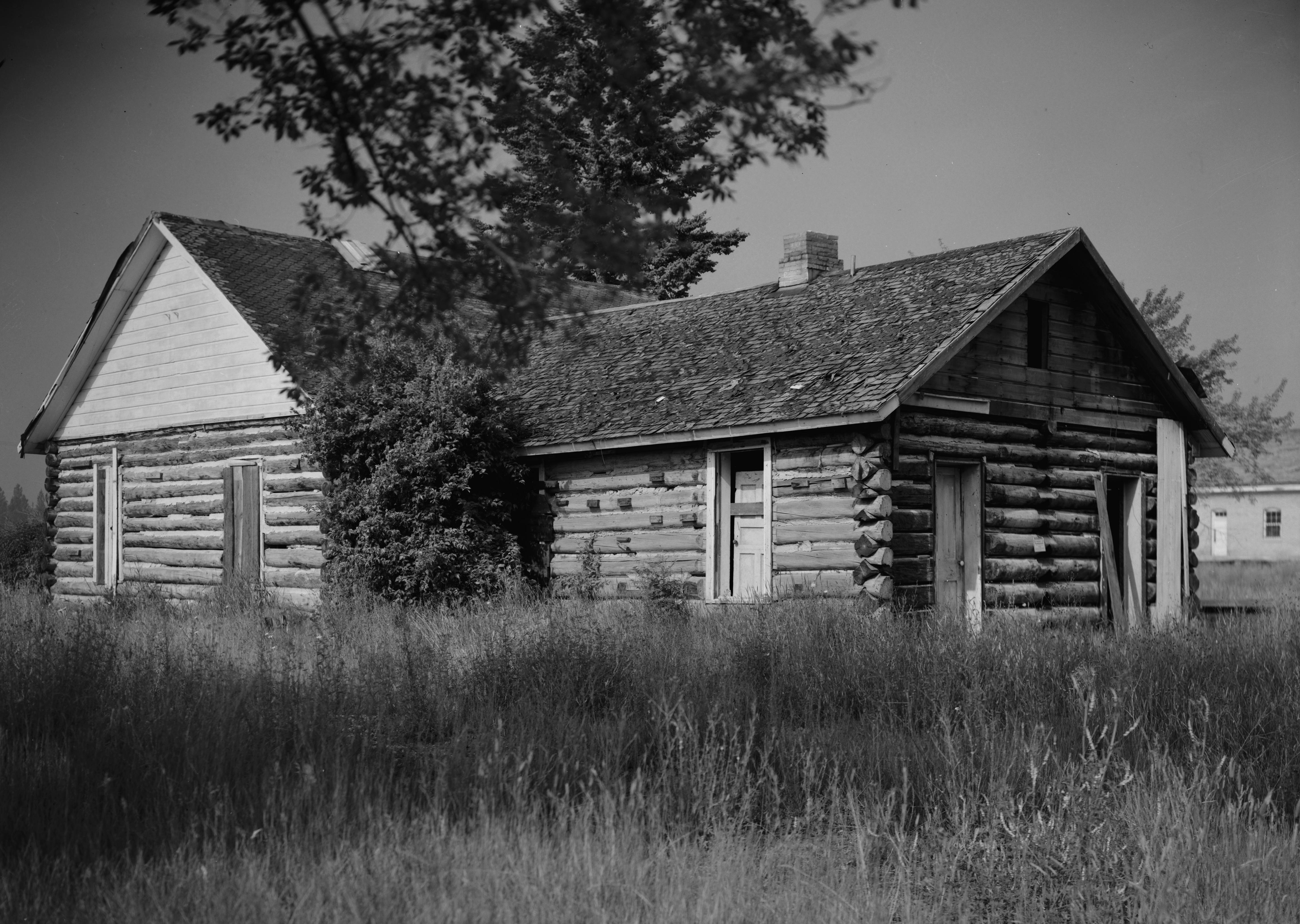
- Barracks at Fort Missoula

- Location within Montana Location within the United States
- Location: Missoula, Montana, USA
- Built: 1877; 149 years ago
- Architect: Civilian Conservation Corps; Et al.
- NRHP reference No.: 87000865
- Added to NRHP: April 29, 1987

Fort Missoula was established by the United States Army in 1877 on land that is now part of the city of Missoula, Montana, to protect settlers in Western Montana from possible threats from the Native American Indians, such as the Nez Perce.

Beginning in 1888, the fort was home to the famous Buffalo Soldiers of the 25th Infantry Regiment (3rd Formation). While stationed at Fort Missoula, this unit tested the practicality of soldiers traveling by bicycles by conducting numerous training rides, with one ride all the way to St. Louis, Missouri. The Trans-America Bicycle Trail established in 1976 goes through Missoula, and covers some of the routes pedaled by the 25th Regiment.

During World War II, Fort Missoula housed an internment camp for Italian detainees, who called the area Bella Vista, and Japanese Americans arrested as "enemy aliens" after Pearl Harbor.

== History ==
=== 19th Century ===
Fort Missoula was established as a permanent military post in 1877 and built in response to requests of local townspeople and settlers for protection in the event of conflict with western Montana Indian tribes. It was intended as a major outpost for the region; however, area residents also were quite aware of the payroll, contracts, and employment opportunities Fort Missoula would provide. Fort Missoula never had walls; rather, it was an "open fort," a design common for posts located west of the Mississippi. Open forts required troops to take the offensive and actively patrol the areas to which they were assigned.

Two companies of the 7th Infantry arrived June 25, 1877 to build a post for a single infantry company. Construction had barely begun when the Company Commander, Captain Charles Rawn, received orders to halt the advance of a group of non-treaty Nez Perce Indians. The Nez Perce, led by Chiefs Joseph, Looking Glass and others, simply went around the soldiers' hastily constructed earth and log barricade in Lolo Canyon (later called "Fort Fizzle") and escaped up the Bitterroot Valley.

The soldiers from Fort Missoula, along with other elements of the 7th Infantry and local civilians, attacked the Nez Perce camp at the Battle of the Big Hole, and were defeated and besieged. Capt. William Logan, second in command at Fort Missoula, was killed. After the battle, four companies returned to Fort Missoula. In September 1877 Gen. William T. Sherman visited the fort and recommended expanding the one company post to a battalion-sized post. The 7th Infantry troops were replaced by a battalion of the 3rd Infantry in November 1877. The troops from the 3rd Infantry constructed the majority of Fort Missoula, and also repaired 100 miles of the Mullan Road from Missoula to the Idaho border.

The 25th Infantry Regiment arrived at Fort Missoula in May 1888. The regiment was one of four created after the Civil War that were made up of black soldiers with white officers. In 1896, Lieutenant James Moss organized the 25th Infantry Bicycle Corps to test the military potential of bicycles. The corps undertook several short journeys – up the Bitterroot Valley by bicycle to deliver dispatches, north to the St. Ignatius area, and through Yellowstone National Park – before making a 1,900-mile (3,100 km) trip from Fort Missoula to St. Louis in 1897. The Army concluded that while the bicycle offered limited military potential, it would never replace the horse. The 25th Infantry returned to Missoula by train. When the Spanish–American War broke out in 1898, the 25th was one of the first units called to fight. The regiment served bravely in Cuba and the Philippines, but was reassigned to other posts after the war's end.

=== 20th Century ===
The efforts of Congressman Joseph Dixon of Missoula led to the appropriation of $1 million in 1904 to remodel Fort Missoula. A modern complex of concrete buildings with red tile roofs was constructed between 1908 and 1914, including a new Officer's Row, barracks, and Post Hospital.

The fort was used as a military training center to train truck drivers and mechanics of the Student Army Training Corps (SATC) during World War I, but was almost abandoned by 1921. However, it was designated as the Northwest Regional Headquarters for the Civilian Conservation Corps in 1933. Fort Missoula served as the administration, training, and supply center for dozens of CCC camps in Montana, Northern Idaho, Glacier National Park, and Yellowstone National Park until June 1942.

Fort Missoula was turned over to the Department of Immigration and Naturalization in 1941 for use as an alien detention center for non-military Italian men (merchant seamen, World's Fair employees, and the crew of an Italian luxury liner seized in the Panama Canal). Fort Missoula housed over 1,200 Italian internees, who referred to the fort as "Camp Bella Vista." The Italians worked on area farms, fought forest fires, and worked in Missoula until they were released in 1944. Following the bombing of Pearl Harbor, 650 Japanese-American men who were considered high risk were interned at the camp. These men were questioned and quickly transferred to other internment camps.

The camp was used as a prison for military personnel accused of military crimes and other personnel awaiting court-martial following World War II. After the post was decommissioned in 1947, many of the buildings were sold, dismantled, and removed from the site. For a number of years, Fort Missoula was a subinstallation under the accountability of Fort Carson, Colorado. The majority of the land is now in the hands of non-military agencies, including the U.S. Forest Service, the Bureau of Land Management, and Missoula County (including the Historical Museum at Fort Missoula). Fort Missoula was formally decommissioned in April, 2001.
