= Toppenish School District =

School district in Toppenish, Washington

Address
- 306 Bolin Drive Toppenish, Yakima County, Washington, 98948; United States

District information
- Motto: "What we do is best for kids"
- Established: 1944; 82 years ago
- Schools: 9
- NCES District ID: 5308970

Students and staff
- District mascot: Wildcat
- Colors: Black, Grey, White, Cardinal, Maroon,

Other information
- Website: www.toppenish.wednet.edu

Toppenish School District No. 202 is a public school district in Toppenish, Washington, United States. It serves the city of Toppenish, the surrounding areas in Yakima County, and members of the nearby Yakima Nation.

In May 2017, the district had an enrollment of 4,617 students.

== Schools ==
=== Early learning schools ===
- Toppenish Early Learning Center

=== Elementary schools ===
- Garfield Elementary
- Lincoln Elementary
- Kirkwood Elementary
- Valley View Elementary

=== Middle schools ===
- Toppenish Middle School

=== High schools ===
- Toppenish High School
- CATS High School

=== Alternative programs ===
- CATS (Computer Academy of Toppenish Schools), an on-line learning program supported by certified teachers.

== Community partners ==
The district has partnerships with various organizations in the community and further afield. These include:

- ESD 105
- Bill and Melinda Gates Foundation
- Heritage University
- Northwest Community Action Center
- University of Washington / Gear-Up
- Washington State University
- Yakama Indian Nation
- Yakima Valley Community College
- Yakima Valley Farm Workers Clinic

== Governance ==
The district is governed by a board of directors elected from geographical sub-districts. Each of the five directors is elected for a term of four years.

The superintendent is Dr Toron Wooldridge.
