= Northern Pacific Railway Museum =

Coordinates: 46.376187°N 120.307878°W

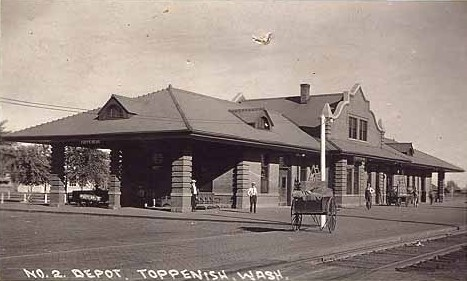
- Toppenish Depot, 1911
- Locale: Toppenish, Washington

Commercial operations
- Built by: Northern Pacific Railway

Preserved operations
- Operated by: Yakima Valley Rail and Steam Museum Association
- Stations: 1
- Length: 7 miles (11 km)
- Preserved gauge: 4 ft 8 1/2 in (1,435 mm) standard gauge

Commercial history
- Opened: 1911
- Closed to passengers: 1961
- Closed: 1981
- Preserved era: 1992 – present

Preservation history
- July 4, 1992: Opened
- 2000: Re-named Northern Pacific Railway Museum
- Headquarters: Toppenish, Washington

Website
- Official website

The Northern Pacific Railway Museum is a railroad museum in Toppenish, Washington. It is located on 10 Asotin Av. and opens between May and December.

== History ==
The depot was originally built and opened in 1911 by the Northern Pacific Railway, it served fifty years transporting passengers until passenger operations officially ended in 1961. The depot officially closed in 1981 and was boarded up.

In 1989, a group of railfans approached the city and asked about leasing the depot to operate tourist trains. The Yakima Valley Rail and Steam Museum Association was formed and in 1990, the ex-Northern Pacific Railway depot in Toppenish, WA, was leased and restoration on the depot officially began. The museum officially opened to the public on July 4, 1992.

In 1993, the depot and freight house was subsequently purchased from the Burlington Northern Railroad.

In 2000, the museum was renamed the North Pacific Railway Museum.

In 1993, the 1902 Northern Pacific steam locomotive No. 1364 was purchased by the museum, it arrived on property in 1994 and restoration work officially began to return it to operating condition for tourist service. The locomotive was hydro-tested and passed at 200 psi, it was fully steamed and certified under the FRA. On January 1, 2026, No. 1364 was fired for the first time in 73 years. On February 21, No. 1364 moved under its own power for the first time.

== Locomotives ==
Locomotive details
Number	Image	Type	Model	Built	Builder	Status
1364		Steam	4-6-0	1902	Baldwin Locomotive Works	Operational

Preceding station	Northern Pacific Railway	Following station
Wapato toward Seattle or Tacoma	Main Line	Alfalfa toward St. Paul
