= Fort Missoula Internment Camp =

Internment camp in Montana, U.S., during World War II

Coordinates: 46°50′34″N 114°03′29″W

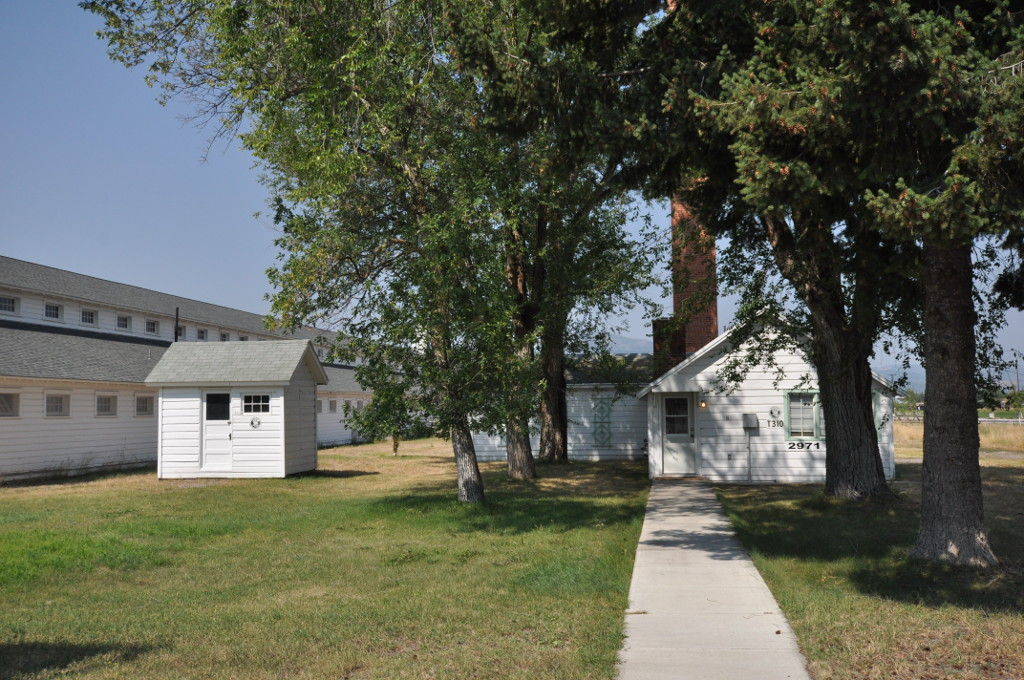
Barracks in Fort Missoula internment camp

Fort Missoula Internment Camp was an internment camp operated by the United States Department of Justice during World War II. Japanese Americans and Italian Americans were imprisoned here during this war.

== History ==
Fort Missoula was established near Missoula, Montana as a permanent military post in 1877 in response to citizen concerns of conflict with local Native American tribes.

In 1941 Fort Missoula was turned over to the "Department of Immigration and Naturalization" for use as an Alien Detention Center for non-military Italian men. The fort held barracks for 1,000 men, officers' quarters, commissary, mess hall, laundry, guardhouse, and a recreation hall designed by Robert Reamer that held a basketball court, bowling alleys, dance hall, cocktail lounge, and restaurant.

Nearly 1100 Italian citizens were interned at Fort Missoula, including merchant seamen and World's Fair workers who were in the U.S. and could not be returned to Italy, as well as the crew of an Italian luxury liner seized in the Panama Canal. In addition, more than 1,000 Japanese men and 23 German resident aliens were interned before being transferred to other facilities.

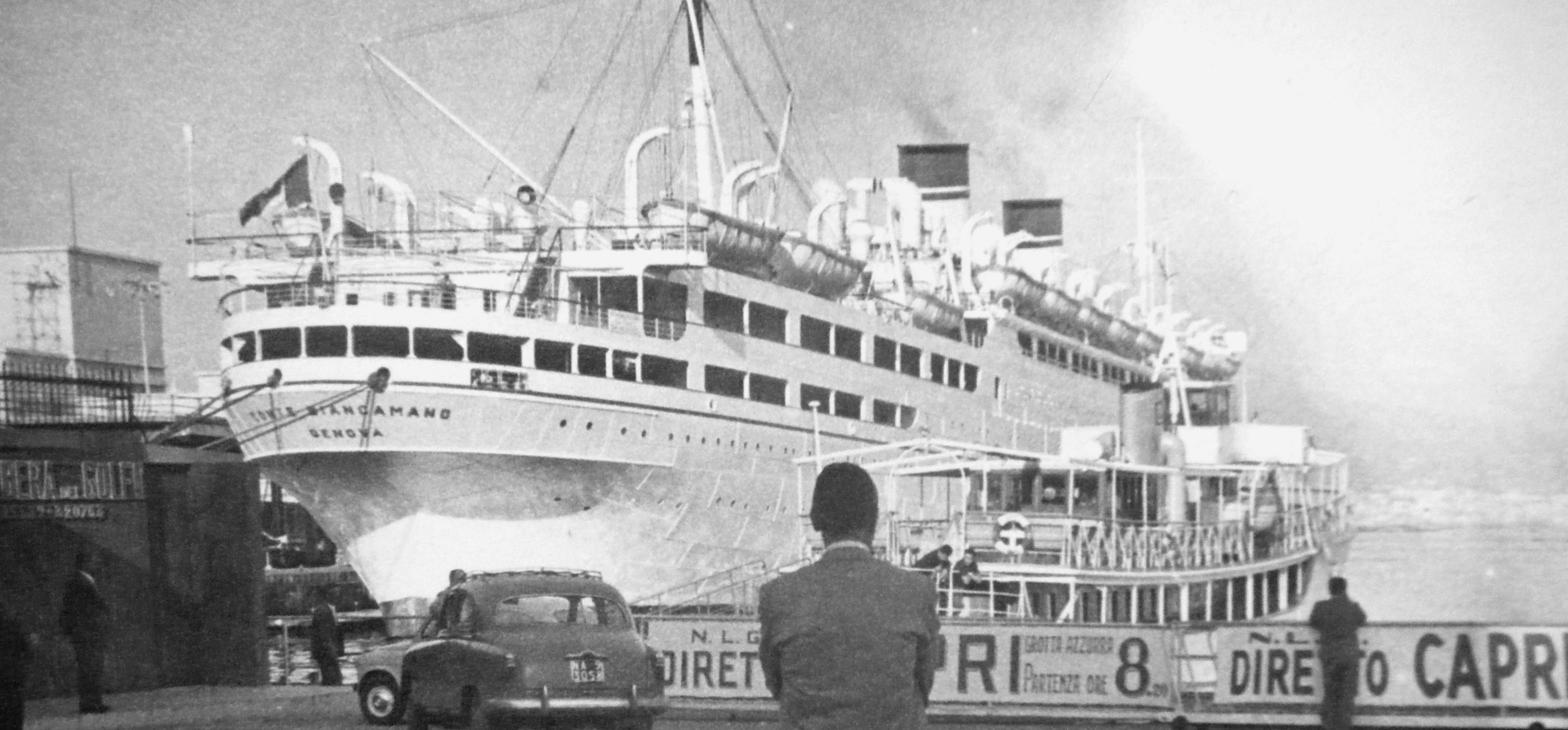
Nearly one third of the Italians interned were sailors of the Biancamano liner

The Italians, who referred to Fort Missoula as Camp "Bella Vista" (beautiful view), worked in area farms, fought forest fires and worked in other Missoula industries before being released in 1944.

Famed Italian actor Guido Trento (1892–1957), also known as Guy Trent and best known for his 1928 film Street Angel, was held at Fort Missoula and released in 1943 when Italy surrendered to the Allies. He later immigrated to the United States.

The Fort Missoula internment camp closed in 1944. By that time, most of the internees had been sent to other camps. Many were repatriated at the end of the war. Some Italians gained U.S. citizenship and stayed in the region.

== See also ==
- Fort Missoula
- Internment of Italian Americans
- Internment of Japanese Americans
