= Toppenish, Washington =

- City
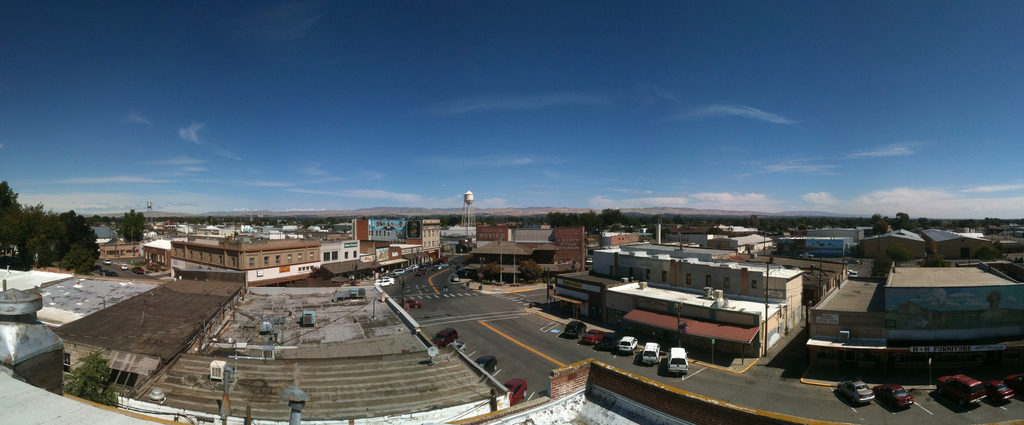
- Northward view over Toppenish in 2010

- Location of Toppenish in Washington
- Coordinates: 46°22′35″N 120°18′36″W
- Country: United States
- State: Washington
- County: Yakima
- Founded: 1884
- Incorporated: April 29, 1907

Government
  - Type: Council–manager
  - Mayor: Elpidia Saavedra
  - City manager: Adam Vaughn

Area
  - City: 2.17 sq mi (5.63 km^{2})
  - Land: 2.17 sq mi (5.63 km^{2})
  - Water: 0 sq mi (0.00 km^{2})
- Elevation: 761 ft (232 m)

Population (2020)
  - City: 8,854
  - Estimate (2023): 8,650
  - Density: 3,980.8/sq mi (1,536.99/km^{2})
  - Urban: 10,057
  - Metro: 256,643 (US: 193rd)
- Time zone: UTC−8 (Pacific (PST))
  - Summer (DST): UTC−7 (PDT)
- ZIP Code: 98948
- Area code: 509
- FIPS code: 53-71960
- GNIS feature ID: 2412086
- Website: toppenish.gov

Toppenish (/ˈtɒppənɪʃ/) is a city in Yakima County, Washington, United States. The population was 8,854 at the 2020 census. It is located within the Yakama Indian Reservation, established in 1855. The city was founded in 1884 on a section of the Northern Pacific Railway through the Yakima Valley.

Toppenish calls itself the "City of Murals", as it has more than 75 murals adorning its buildings. The first, "Clearing the Land", was painted in 1989, and the city hosts horse-drawn tours and annual art events. All murals are historically accurate and depict scenes of the region from 1840 to 1940.

== History ==
All territory set aside for the Yakama Indian Reservation by the Treaty of Washington was held communally in the name of the tribe. None of the land was individually owned. The treaty of 1855, between the United States government, representatives from thirteen other bands, tribes, and Chief Kamiakin, resulted in the Yakama Nation relinquishing 16,920 square miles (43,800 km^{2}) of their homeland. Prior to their ceding the land, only Native Americans had lived in the area.

For a time they were not much disturbed, but the Northern Pacific Railway was constructed into the area in 1883. More white settlers migrated into the region, looking for farming land, and joined the ranchers in older settlements bordering the Columbia River.

The Dawes Act of 1887 was part of federal legislation designed to force assimilation to European-American ways by Native Americans. Specifically, it was designed to break up the communal tribal land of Native American reservations and allot portions to individual households of tribal members, in order to encourage subsistence farming in the European-American style and familiarity with western conceptions of property. Lands declared excess by the government to this allotment were available for sale to anyone, and European Americans had been demanding more land in the West for years. Under varying conditions, Native American landowners were to be allowed to sell their plots.

Josephine Bowser Lillie was among Native Americans granted an 80-acre (320,000 m^{2}) allotment of land within the Yakama Reservation. Of mixed Native American/European ancestry and Yakama identification, she is known as "The Mother of Toppenish." She platted the north 40 acres (160,000 m^{2}) of her land. These tracts became the first deeded land to be sold on the Yakama Nation Reservation.

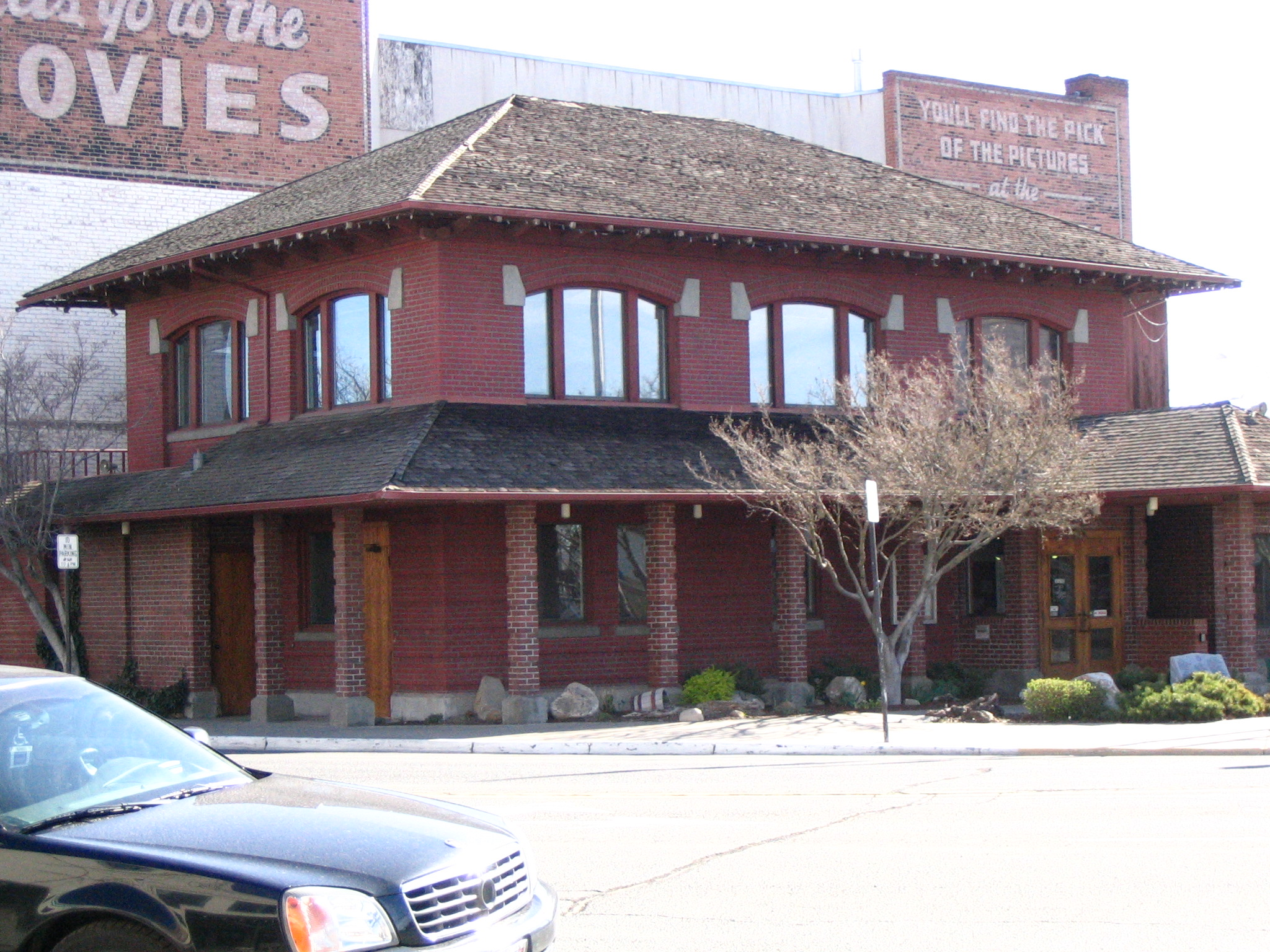
Toppenish City Hall

A driving figure in Toppenish's early development was William Leslie Shearer (October 31, 1862 – June 5, 1922). Since Toppenish had no church in 1897 Shearer obtained permission from the Northern Pacific Railroad Company and offered the freight room for religious services. Following this, he helped organize the first Methodist Church and, as trustee, was instrumental in the construction of a building that would house the church and also serve as school classrooms until a separate schoolhouse could be built. The building was completed in time for the 1898-1899 school term.

After leaving the employment of the railroad, Shearer, with Frank J. Lemon as his partner, opened Toppenish's first drugstore in 1905. About a year later, Shearer sold out, turning his attention to the newly organized Yakima Produce and Trading company, with George Plank, A.W. McDonald and M. McDonald as partners. The company bought some acreage and leased more sagebrush land to develop the 1700-acre ranch near Satus Station. Shearer had a system of irrigation ditches constructed leading from Satus Creek to the acreage.

Toppenish was officially incorporated on April 29, 1907, and founded by Johnny Barnes. The city lies inside the boundaries of the Yakama Nation's Reservation.

== Etymology ==
Tẋápniš in the Sahaptin language of the Yakama is the likely source of the name Toppenish. The word means ‘protruded, stuck out’ and recalls a landslide that occurred on the ridge south of White Swan, Washington. According to William Bright, the name "Toppenish" comes from the Sahaptin word /txápniš/, referring to a landslide, from /txá-/, "accidentally", /-pni-/, "to launch, to take forth and out", and /-ša/, "continuative present tense".

== Geography ==
According to the United States Census Bureau, the city has a total area of 2.17 square miles (5.62 km^{2}), all land.

== Demographics ==
Historical population
| Census | Pop. | Note | %± |
|---|---|---|---|
| 1910 | 1,598 | | — |
| 1920 | 3,120 | | 95.2% |
| 1930 | 2,774 | | −11.1% |
| 1940 | 3,683 | | 32.8% |
| 1950 | 5,265 | | 43.0% |
| 1960 | 5,667 | | 7.6% |
| 1970 | 5,744 | | 1.4% |
| 1980 | 6,517 | | 13.5% |
| 1990 | 7,419 | | 13.8% |
| 2000 | 8,946 | | 20.6% |
| 2010 | 8,949 | | 0.0% |
| 2020 | 8,854 | | −1.1% |
| 2023 (est.) | 8,650 | | −2.3% |
U.S. Decennial Census; 2020 Census

=== Racial and ethnic composition ===
Toppenish, Washington – racial and ethnic composition Note: the US Census treats Hispanic/Latino as an ethnic category. This table excludes Latinos from the racial categories and assigns them to a separate category. Hispanics/Latinos may be of any race.
| Race / ethnicity (NH = non-Hispanic) | Pop. 2000 | Pop. 2010 | Pop. 2020 | % 2000 | % 2010 | % 2020 |
|---|---|---|---|---|---|---|
| White alone (NH) | 1,398 | 785 | 627 | 15.63% | 8.77% | 7.08% |
| Black or African American alone (NH) | 29 | 18 | 17 | 0.32% | 0.20% | 0.19% |
| Native American or Alaska Native alone (NH) | 594 | 627 | 580 | 6.64% | 7.01% | 6.55% |
| Asian alone (NH) | 22 | 13 | 15 | 0.25% | 0.15% | 0.17% |
| Pacific Islander alone (NH) | 1 | 0 | 7 | 0.01% | 0.00% | 0.08% |
| Other race alone (NH) | 13 | 26 | 21 | 0.15% | 0.29% | 0.24% |
| Mixed race or multiracial (NH) | 115 | 92 | 113 | 1.29% | 1.03% | 1.28% |
| Hispanic or Latino (any race) | 6,774 | 7,388 | 7,474 | 75.72% | 82.56% | 84.41% |
| Total | 8,946 | 8,949 | 8,854 | 100.00% | 100.00% | 100.00% |

=== 2020 census ===
As of the 2020 census, there were 8,854 people, 2,397 households, and 1,926 families residing in the city. The population density was 4,147.1 inhabitants per square mile (1,601.2/km^{2}), with 2,453 housing units at an average density of 1,148.9 per square mile (443.6/km^{2}); 2.3% of the housing units were vacant, the homeowner vacancy rate was 0.4%, and the rental vacancy rate was 2.0%.

The median age was 28.5 years; 33.7% of residents were under the age of 18, 9.3% were under the age of 5, and 9.5% were 65 years of age or older. For every 100 females there were 101.6 males, and for every 100 females age 18 and over there were 98.5 males.

There were 2,397 households, of which 55.6% had children under the age of 18 living with them. Of all households, 47.7% were married-couple households, 16.6% were households with a male householder and no spouse or partner present, and 25.9% were households with a female householder and no spouse or partner present. About 14.3% of all households were made up of individuals and 6.8% had someone living alone who was 65 years of age or older.

Ninety-nine point eight percent of residents lived in urban areas, while 0.2% lived in rural areas.

Racial composition as of the 2020 census
| Race | Number | Percent |
|---|---|---|
| White | 1,623 | 18.3% |
| Black or African American | 35 | 0.4% |
| American Indian and Alaska Native | 829 | 9.4% |
| Asian | 32 | 0.4% |
| Native Hawaiian and Other Pacific Islander | 12 | 0.1% |
| Some other race | 4,674 | 52.8% |
| Two or more races | 1,649 | 18.6% |
| Hispanic or Latino (of any race) | 7,474 | 84.4% |

=== 2010 census ===
As of the 2010 census, there were 8,949 people, 2,237 households, and 1,900 families residing in the city. The population density was 4,280.0 inhabitants per square mile (1,652.5/km^{2}). There were 2,334 housing units at an average density of 1,116.7 per square mile (431.2/km^{2}). The racial makeup of the city was 33.85% White, 0.68% African American, 8.05% Native American, 0.31% Asian, 0.07% Pacific Islander, 52.58% from some other races and 4.47% from two or more races. Hispanic or Latino people of any race were 82.56% of the population.

There were 2,237 households, of which 62.8% had children under the age of 18 living with them, 55.8% were married couples living together, 19.0% had a female householder with no husband present, 10.1% had a male householder with no wife present, and 15.1% were non-families. 11.3% of all households were made up of individuals, and 5.5% had someone living alone who was 65 years of age or older. The average household size was 3.96 and the average family size was 4.22.

The median age in the city was 24.3 years. 37.5% of residents were under the age of 18; 13.7% were between the ages of 18 and 24; 25% were from 25 to 44; 17.2% were from 45 to 64; and 6.7% were 65 years of age or older. The gender makeup of the city was 51.3% male and 48.7% female.

== Crime ==
Toppenish
- Crime rates* (2023)

Violent crimes
- Homicide: 8
- Rape: 3
- Robbery: 27
- Aggravated assault: 26
- Total violent crime: 64

Property crimes
- Burglary: 88
- Larceny-theft: 333
- Motor vehicle theft: 101
- Arson: 2
- Total property crime: 524
- Note: Reported crimes per 100,000 population Source: 2023 FBI UCR Data

According to the Uniform Crime Report statistics compiled by the Federal Bureau of Investigation (FBI) in 2023, there were 64 violent crimes and 524 property crimes per 100,000 residents. Of these, the violent crimes consisted of 8 murders, 3 forcible rapes, 27 robberies and 26 aggravated assaults, while 88 burglaries, 333 larceny-thefts, 101 motor vehicle thefts and 2 acts of arson defined the property offenses.

== Education ==
Public schools are operated by the Toppenish School District, whose offices are located here.

The Yakama Nation also operates the Yakama Nation Tribal School, which is adjacent to Toppenish.

The main campus of Heritage University (HU) is in Toppenish. HU was established as Heritage College in 1982, and received acreditation in 1985 from the Northwest Commission on Colleges and Universities (NWCCU). Heritage College became Heritage University in 2004.

== Notable people ==
- Vicki Adams, trick rider
- Fred Anderson, former NFL player
- Leslie E. Brown, United States Marine Corps aviator
- Westley Allan Dodd, serial killer
- Bunky Echo-Hawk, Native American artist and poet
- Terry Grosz, game warden
- Charles Lollar, businessman and political candidate
- A.B. Quintanilla, record producer and musician
- Gregory Short, composer, educator, and performer
- Dale E. Stovall, United States Air Force general
- Billy J. Williams, former United States attorney for the District of Oregon

== See also ==
- Northern Pacific Railway Museum, a former railroad depot in Toppenish
