= Kanaskat, Washington =

Unincorporated community in Washington, United States

- Unincorporated community
- Location in Washington and the United States Kanaskat (the United States)
- Coordinates: 47°19′12″N 121°53′38″W
- Country: United States
- State: Washington
- County: King
- Elevation: 827 ft (252 m)
- Time zone: UTC-8 (Pacific (PST))
  - Summer (DST): UTC-7 (PDT)
- GNIS feature ID: 1521559

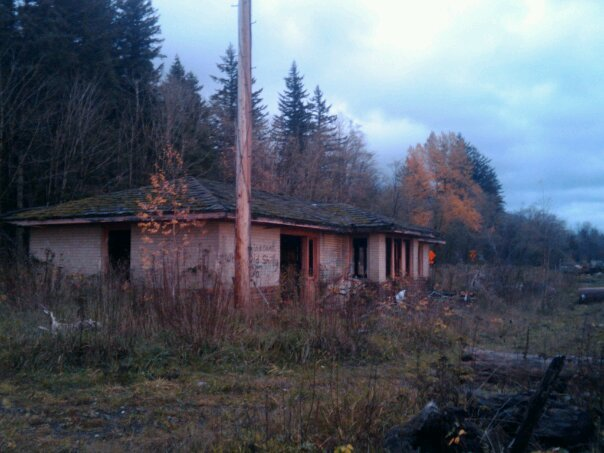
The Northern Pacific's third depot at Kanaskat, built at the close of World War II on the abandoned alignment used before the construction of Howard Hanson Dam

Kanaskat, Washington is an unincorporated community in King County, Washington, United States.

== History ==
Kanaskat was a small facility on the Northern Pacific Railway, today's BNSF Railway, created by the opening of a cut-off between Palmer, Washington and Auburn, Washington, built 1899-1900 by the Northern Pacific's contractors Horace C. Henry and his partner Nelson Bennett. Kanaskat served as a water-stop for steam-powered trains out of Auburn, as well as a small yard and scale for the NP's Green River Branch northward to Kangley, Washington, Selleck, Washington, and Kerriston, Washington, as well as the large mills located just to the south in Enumclaw, Washington and Buckley, Washington.

In 1900, the NP built a 2,850-foot passing track, a 1,200-foot house track, a wye connection with the Green River Branch to Kangley, Selleck, Barneston and Kerriston, a fourth class combination station, a second class section house, a 24-man bunkhouse, a double tool house, and a box water tank and standpipe. The ornate Victorian station at this site was destroyed by fire in 1944 when a wood stove pipe through the roof overheated. It was replaced by an innovative temporary station -– a round-roof box car. After World War Two the Northern Pacific replaced the box car with a solid brick station. This lasted until 1959, when the U.S. Army Corps of Engineers were forced to build the Northern Pacific yet another station directly northwest of its postwar structure (due to the line change caused by the Corps of Engineer's Howard A. Hanson Dam at Eagle Gorge). Thus, Kanaskat had the dubious honor of being home to four stations in 90 years.

The Chicago, Milwaukee, St. Paul and Pacific Railroad also crossed through the area, moving north-south from its main line station at Cedar Falls, Washington, south to the large mill at Enumclaw, Washington. Track connections between the two roads were made to the north and south of town.

The town was named after Kanasket (alternately spelled Kanaskat), a chief of the Klickitat people, who was killed by the U.S. Army ca. 1855-56.

Kanaskat-Palmer State Park is around one mile south of the settlement.
