= Nagrom, Washington =

Ghost town in Washington (state)

- Ghost town
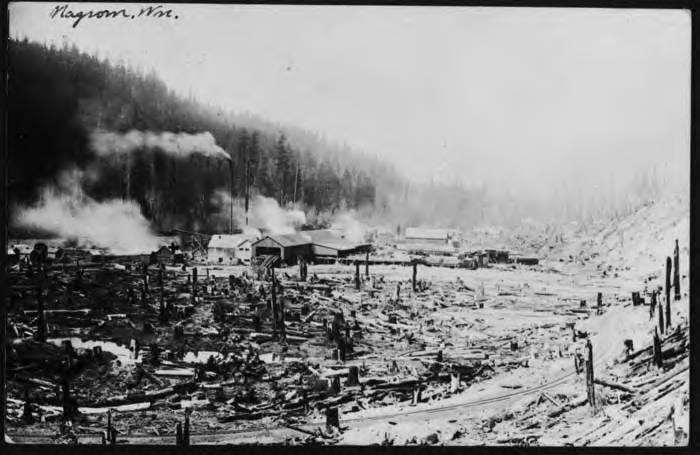
- Sawmill at Nagrom, circa 1912

- Location within Washington (state) Location within the United States
- Coordinates: 47°13′30″N 121°36′12″W
- Country: United States
- State: Washington
- County: King
- Time zone: UTC-8 (Pacific (PST))
  - Summer (DST): UTC-7 (PDT)

Nagrom is a ghost town in King County, Washington, United States.

== History ==
A logging company town, Nagrom was located in the Green River watershed between Kanaskat and Lester. The town was built by the Morgan Lumber Company and named after Elmer G. Morgan, the company founder and owner ("Nagrom" is "Morgan" spelled backward). The site was chosen for its access to timber and suitability to build a sawmill and mill pond. In 1910, Morgan petitioned the Northern Pacific Railway, which operated the rail line out of Puget Sound and up over Stampede Pass, to build a spur into the small town. The railway balked, but Morgan persisted and eventually the railway relented. The spur into town was built in 1911. A post office was established that same year, along with a telephone and telegraph exchange.

Between 1914 and 1918, rivers and streams flooded in the city of Tacoma's watershed, which was located in and around the town of Nagrom, sweeping sewage and contaminated water from the company settlement into the city's water supply. Worries about typhoid, a common health risk of the era, caused health officials to instruct residents living downstream from company settlements like Lester, Baldi, and Nagrom to boil their drinking water to reduce typhoid-related illnesses.

From 1911 to 1924, the Morgan Lumber Company continued to work the area for timber and to run the sawmill at Nagrom. In 1921-22 the population topped out for this town with an estimated 450 residents. In 1924, however, the company went out of business, presumably due to falling lumber prices following World War I. Logging continued, but at a slower pace, as trucks began replacing the railroad in the logging industry. During the 1930s, the U.S. Forest Service, with the help of the Civilian Conservation Corps began managing the forested land in the area.

== Decline ==
Around 1910, the city of Tacoma acquired the water rights on the Green River. In the early 1950s, the city's utility arm, today's Tacoma Public Utilities, began buying private land along the banks of the river between their intake at Headworks (just east of Kanaskat), eastwards to the railroad and logging town of Lester. Beginning with the construction of the Howard Hanson Dam, the city limited access between Headworks and Lester, installing gates at various access points to the Green River watershed. About 1967, Tacoma purchased the entire town of Lester from the Northern Pacific Railway. By 1984, most residents had moved out and the rail line was mothballed by the Burlington Northern Railroad (successor of Northern Pacific). Nagrom, Lester and all the former communities along the rail line had become ghost towns.
