= Palmer, Washington =

Unincorporated community in Washington, United States

- Unincorporated community
- Location in Washington and the United States Palmer (the United States)
- Coordinates: 47°18′51″N 121°53′32″W
- Country: United States
- State: Washington
- County: King
- Elevation: 886 ft (270 m)
- Time zone: UTC-8 (Pacific (PST))
  - Summer (DST): UTC-7 (PDT)
- GNIS feature ID: 1524150

Palmer is an unincorporated community in King County, Washington, United States. It is located along the Green River next to the Kanaskat-Palmer State Park.

Palmer was originally a telegraph station on the Northern Pacific Railway opened during the construction of the railway's line across Stampede Pass c. 1886. The point was originally named "Green River." In 1888, the NP changed the name to "Palmer" for George L. Palmer, then a timber cruiser for the company and later an official in the company's Land Department. The original route across Stampede Pass traveled from Tacoma to Puyallup, where the line turned east and continued to Orting, Buckley, Enumclaw, and Palmer. The railway continued east along the Green River to Lester and Stampede Pass.

Between 1899 and 1900 the Northern Pacific built a shortcut from Palmer Junction (just east of Palmer), crossing the Green River to Kanaskat, and thence westward to Ravensdale, Covington and finally Auburn. This route is known as the Palmer Cutoff and is still used by today's BNSF Railway.

== Climate ==
Palmer has an Oceanic climate (Cfb) according to the Köppen climate classification system.

Climate data for Palmer (1991–2020 normals, extremes 1924–present)
Month	Jan	Feb	Mar	Apr	May	Jun	Jul	Aug	Sep	Oct	Nov	Dec	Year
Record high °F (°C)	66 (19)	69 (21)	78 (26)	88 (31)	100 (38)	111 (44)	101 (38)	101 (38)	97 (36)	92 (33)	74 (23)	65 (18)	111 (44)
Mean maximum °F (°C)	56.1 (13.4)	59.1 (15.1)	66.1 (18.9)	74.6 (23.7)	82.6 (28.1)	85.2 (29.6)	90.2 (32.3)	90.0 (32.2)	85.7 (29.8)	74.0 (23.3)	60.9 (16.1)	54.8 (12.7)	93.3 (34.1)
Mean daily maximum °F (°C)	44.7 (7.1)	47.5 (8.6)	51.4 (10.8)	56.5 (13.6)	63.6 (17.6)	67.6 (19.8)	74.9 (23.8)	75.6 (24.2)	69.9 (21.1)	58.8 (14.9)	49.2 (9.6)	43.3 (6.3)	58.6 (14.8)
Daily mean °F (°C)	39.4 (4.1)	40.9 (4.9)	43.7 (6.5)	47.7 (8.7)	54.1 (12.3)	58.2 (14.6)	63.9 (17.7)	64.5 (18.1)	59.8 (15.4)	51.1 (10.6)	43.5 (6.4)	38.3 (3.5)	50.4 (10.2)
Mean daily minimum °F (°C)	34.1 (1.2)	34.4 (1.3)	36.0 (2.2)	38.9 (3.8)	44.5 (6.9)	48.7 (9.3)	52.9 (11.6)	53.4 (11.9)	49.8 (9.9)	43.4 (6.3)	37.8 (3.2)	33.4 (0.8)	42.3 (5.7)
Mean minimum °F (°C)	23.0 (−5.0)	24.3 (−4.3)	28.6 (−1.9)	32.1 (0.1)	35.7 (2.1)	41.8 (5.4)	46.7 (8.2)	46.2 (7.9)	41.4 (5.2)	34.0 (1.1)	27.0 (−2.8)	23.3 (−4.8)	17.5 (−8.1)
Record low °F (°C)	0 (−18)	−3 (−19)	12 (−11)	22 (−6)	26 (−3)	32 (0)	33 (1)	38 (3)	32 (0)	19 (−7)	6 (−14)	−1 (−18)	−3 (−19)
Average precipitation inches (mm)	10.97 (279)	7.96 (202)	9.18 (233)	7.75 (197)	5.87 (149)	5.32 (135)	2.08 (53)	2.32 (59)	3.99 (101)	7.88 (200)	11.48 (292)	10.41 (264)	85.21 (2,164)
Average snowfall inches (cm)	6.1 (15)	4.0 (10)	2.0 (5.1)	0.4 (1.0)	0.0 (0.0)	0.0 (0.0)	0.0 (0.0)	0.0 (0.0)	0.0 (0.0)	0.0 (0.0)	0.9 (2.3)	4.1 (10)	17.5 (43.4)
Average precipitation days (≥ 0.01 in)	20.8	18.2	22.0	20.0	17.3	14.8	8.5	7.6	11.1	17.3	21.1	20.9	199.6
Average snowy days (≥ 0.1 in)	2.5	1.1	1.1	0.4	0.0	0.0	0.0	0.0	0.0	0.0	0.6	2.1	7.8
Source 1: NOAA
Source 2: National Weather Service
