= Cumberland, Washington =

Unincorporated community in Washington, United States

- Unincorporated community
- Location in Washington and the United States Cumberland (the United States)
- Coordinates: 47°16′58″N 121°55′37″W
- Country: United States
- State: Washington
- County: King
- Elevation: 850 ft (260 m)
- Time zone: UTC-8 (Pacific (PST))
  - Summer (DST): UTC-7 (PDT)
- ZIP codes: 98022
- Area code: 360
- GNIS feature ID: 1518407

Cumberland is an unincorporated community in King County, Washington, United States. Originally a mining camp, Cumberland was named by F.X. Schriner in 1893 after the Cumberland coal region of the Appalachian Mountains. Cumberland gained a post office on October 13, 1894. The Enumclaw post office now serves this area. Although many other mining camps in the area have disappeared, Cumberland can still be found in the Cascade foothills between Nolte State Park and Kanaskat-Palmer State Park. It is accessible via Southeast King County backroads. Several smaller mines dotted the area, including the "Navy" mine, and the Hyde mine, located at the outskirts of town.

Cumberland is within the KCFD #28 Fire Department service area, also known as the Enumclaw Fire Department. It is a King County registered voting precinct.

== Cunningham vs Metropolitan Municipality of Seattle ==
In 1989, the county-wide transit and sewage waste municipality known as "Metro" (short for Metropolitan King County), planned a 25-year sewage sludge waste spraying on the 400 acres (1.6 km^{2}) of woods northwest of the town. Following a grassroots community protest, (which was led by Valerie Cunningham), objections from the Muckleshoot Native American tribe (who are downriver on the nearby Green River), and other environmental groups, the municipality agreed to create an Environmental impact statement (EIS). The EIS showed a number of toxins and heavy metals present in the sewage sludge, and the project was officially cancelled by Metropolitan King County in 1992.

In the aftermath of the sewage sludge fight, Valerie Cunningham and the Anti-Sludge Committee realized that the Metropolitan Municipality of Seattle Council "Metro" did not represent the rural communities fairly. Some Metro districts had two representatives, some had four representatives. Therefore, the Metro Council districts did not have a one-person, one vote representation. The American Civil Liberties Union represented Ms. Cunningham in a class action lawsuit, which she won. The results were that the King County voters decided to combine the Metropolitan Municipality of Seattle council with the King County council.

== Defend and Preserve Cumberland ==
In 2003, multiple parcels of land were sold to SEGALE PROPERTIES LLC from Plum Creek Timber. During this time multiple environmental group attempted to add the land to the nearby Green River Gorge State Park but were unsuccessful. In 2021 a Pre-Application was submitted for a planned a near 1,000 acre mine just to the immediate north of Cumberland. According to the SEPA submitted to King County, the company estimated the life of the mine to be 25–35 years and would remove a potential 55-million tons of aggregate over the life of the mine. The initial fees were paid on 01/04/2024 and the Filed Application number became GRDE23-0083. The public notice was confirmed on February 1, 2024 and mailed to local residents on February 6. With limited time, local residents came together in collective effort against the purposed project. Local historian Zachary Pratt summed up the mood of the room with the quote, "Coal mining in the area ended in 1999... mining needs to stay in our past". Segale would counter by claiming "a lot of misinformation" was being spread in the community. On February 27, 2024 Segale held a required public meeting at the Black Diamond Elementary School which lead to a wider outcry from residents beyond Cumberland. As part of the public coming together, the Concerned Citizens of Cumberland, a grassroots nonprofit organization(originally established in 1989 by Valerie Cunningham), and later Defend Cumberland, arose as a collective effort between several members of the local and regional area. Defend Cumberland works in close relationship with the Enumclaw Plateau Community Association. Several local cities, towns, fire and school districts, private, state, county and federal organizations expressed concerns for the project, with road safety, environmental, water and wildlife concerns all cited as heightened concerns.
