= Flaming Geyser State Park =

State park in Washington (state), United States

- Flaming Geyser
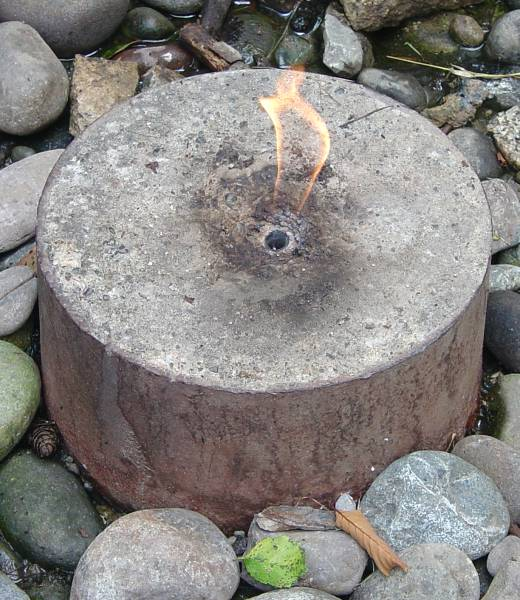
- The Flaming Geyser. It burned significantly higher before the 1960s.

- Location within Washington (state)
- Location: King County, Washington, Washington, USA
- Nearest city: Black Diamond, Washington
- Coordinates: 47°16′20″N 122°01′22″W
- Area: 503 acres (204 ha)
- Elevation: 226
- Governing body: Washington State Parks and Recreation Commission
- Website: Flaming Geyser State Park

The Flaming Geyser State Park is located on the Green River in southwestern King County, Washington, near the city of Black Diamond. The park was named for a flame which burned through a concrete basin, fueled by a methane gas pocket 1,000 feet (300 m) below the surface. When the pocket was discovered by prospective coal miners in the early 1900s, the test hole hit gas and saltwater, shooting water and flames 25 feet (10 m) into the air. The same methane pocket seeps gas through a mud hole to create the "Bubbling Geyser" nearby. Both "geysers" can be found along a short hike, though as of 2016 the flaming geyser is no longer lit due to depletion of its methane source.

Despite these unique features, the most popular park use is for summer tubing and rafting in the river. Flaming Geyser also has a specially designated area for flying remote-controlled model airplanes.

Flaming Geyser while it was still burning in 2009

== History ==
Flaming Geyser was operated privately from the 1920s until the 1960s when the park fell into bankruptcy. When the land risked takeover by home development, Washington State Parks purchased the land and has managed it since. Urban legend of the park's history describes how miner Eugene Lawson aimed to profit from the ignited methane emission. While Lawson is a real historical figure who owned the Lawson Mine between 1895 and 1898 prior to two fatal explosions in 1902 and 1910, there is little record of involvement with Flaming Geyser.

== Park management ==
The Park is managed by Washington State Parks and Recreation Commission as a part of the Green River Gorge State Park Conservation Area. This conservation area covers 2,008.02 acres (8 km^{2}) and 18 miles (29 km) of river shoreline bordered by Flaming Geyser to the west and Kanaskat-Palmer State Park to the east. The area also includes Black Diamond Heritage Area, Old Town of Franklin Heritage Area, Hanging Gardens Recreation Area, Walter A. Jellum Recreation Area, and Nolte State Park.

== Natural resources ==
The park is 503 acres (2 km^{2}) with over 3 miles (4.8 km) of river shoreline. The area is known for its coal and cinnabar mines, with approximately 14% of Washington's coal coming from the Black Diamond vicinity.

The Green River is a popular steelheading location in the winter, and an ADA-accessible Salmon Interpretative Trail in the park explains more about this ecological relationship.
