= Weston, Washington =

Ghost town in Washington (state)

- Ghost town
- The Northern Pacific Railway station at Weston, Washington, ca. 1913

- Location within Washington (state) Location within the United States
- Country: United States
- State: Washington
- County: King
- Founded: approx. 1900
- Time zone: UTC-8 (Pacific (PST))
  - Summer (DST): UTC-7 (PDT)

Weston is a ghost town in Washington State founded circa 1900. Located at the foot of the western 2.2 percent grade of the Northern Pacific Railway's climb up Stampede Pass to Stampede Tunnel, the town served as the western helper station on the pass, counterpart to Easton, Washington. Facilities included an engine house, telegraph station, water tank, turntable and some ancillary residences and eating houses.

With the Cascade Range to the north and the Green River to the south, Weston was disadvantageously located for future expansion. In c. 1891, the Northern Pacific moved its western helper terminus approximately four miles to the west at a point it designated Lester, Washington. Weston was unique in that the Northern Pacific, crossing the Green River twice, also created a short cut-off line at Weston, creating a complete loop. (Further to the east, approaching the summit of Stampede Pass, the Northern Pacific's engineers alignment created what came to be known as the Borup Loop [so named for the telegraph station located at the center of the loop—Borup, Washington], this however was a misnomer, as the alignment is actually an elongated S-curve created by back-to-back horseshoes.)

Weston lasted as a small telegraph station (one story, twenty by thirty feet) and water stop on the Northern Pacific until c. 1915, when double tracking of Stampede Pass between Lester and Easton (sans the summit tunnel area itself) and a large iconic trestle completely replaced the Weston Loop and Weston. The image accompanying this article looks down from the trestle which crosses the Green River and replaced the old loop arrangement.

== Geography ==
The exact location of Weston, Washington is still unknown, however it was most likely along the Green River southeast of Lester, Washington and east of Enumclaw, Washington. Old maps show it as being near the confluence of the Green River and Intake Creek, somewhere near 47°12′14″N 121°24′42″W. There are many long overgrown man-made clearings and cultivated trees in this area, and evidence of the original rail line cut through the trees.
