= Krain =

Krain is either

- Carniola, the German name of a historical region within the Duchy of Austria in modern Slovenia
- Krain Township, Minnesota, a township in Minnesota, US
- Krain, Washington, an unincorporated locality in King County
- Krain krain, the common name for the leafy vegetable Corchorus in Sierra Leone
- Krain, a word of slavic origin meaning borderland, used in several territorial names such as Ukraine (according to classical interpretation)
