= Patton Bridge (Auburn, Washington) =

- U.S. National Register of Historic Places
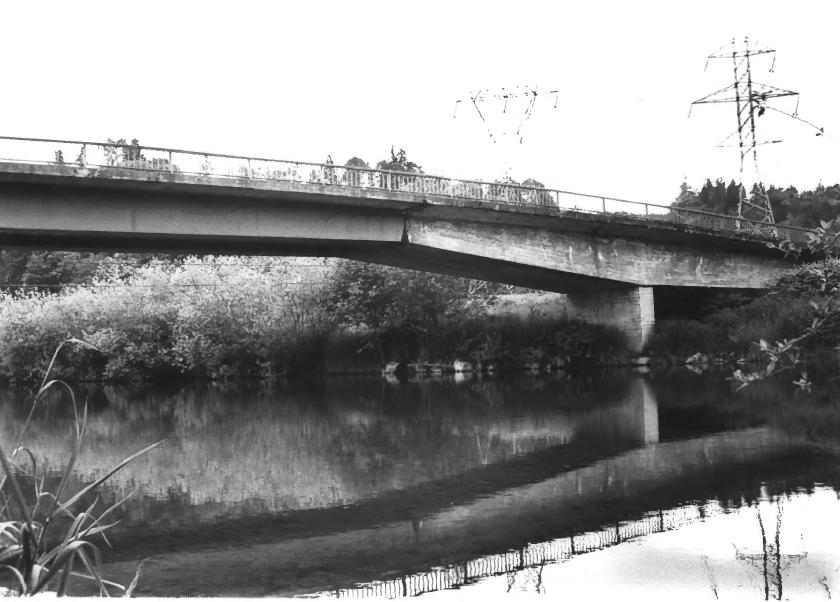
- Patton Bridge is a bridge located in Auburn, Washington, showing the cantilever and hanging sections.

- Location within Washington (state)
- Nearest city: Auburn, Washington
- Coordinates: 47°17′18″N 122°9′34″W
- Area: less than one acre
- Built: 1950
- Architect: Homer M. Hadley
- Architectural style: box girder
- MPS: Bridges of Washington State MPS
- NRHP reference No.: 95000626
- Added to NRHP: May 24, 1995

Patton Bridge is a bridge located in Auburn, Washington listed on the National Register of Historic Places. The bridge spans the Green River near metropolitan Auburn, Washington. It was designed by bridge engineer and designer Homer M. Hadley. The combination of concrete and steel box girders employed in the bridge's represents a variation of the box girder bridge style. The Patton Bridge was the only structure built between 1941 and 1950 which exhibits this innovative modification of the box girder design.

== Description ==
Built in 1950, the Patton Bridge spans the Green River near the city of Auburn in King County, Washington. The bridge is a three-span cantilever with two anchor arms, two cantilever arms and a suspended section. It includes a combination of concrete and steel box girders. The bridge was designed by Homer M. Hadley, a consulting engineer from Washington State. The anchor arms and cantilever arms are multiple box, two-cell reinforced concrete box girders. The suspended section consists of two spread, welded steel box girders with reinforced concrete deck. The concrete deck is fixed to the top flange plate of the girders with steel shear developers. Utilization of this deck design allows the concrete deck and steel box girders to act in composite design; i.e., the bottom flange of the steel box resists tensile forces while the concrete deck resists compressive forces. The Patton Bridge's anchor arms are 115 feet (35 m) feet long, the cantilever arms are 50 feet (15 m) long, and the suspended span is 100 feet (30 m). The bridge has a total length of 430 feet (130 m). The center span of 200 feet (61 m) is the longest box girder span constructed in the state during the 1940s.

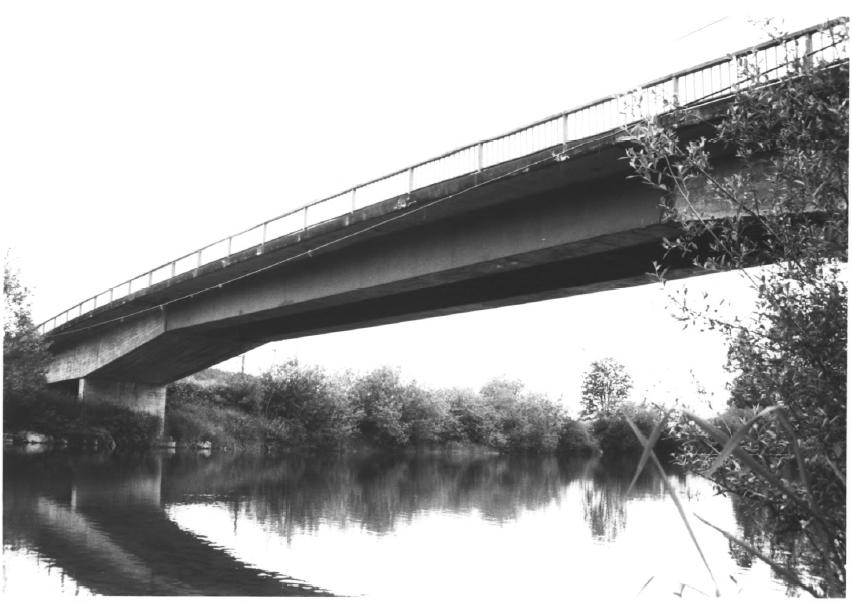
Patton Bridge is a bridge located in Auburn, Washington, showing the hanging section.

== Bibliography ==
- King County Department of Public Works. Patton Bridge plans, dated 29 August 1949, on file in the Department of Public Works, Seattle, Washington.
- King County Department of Public Works. "Bridge Condition Card—Patton Bridge" on file in the Department of Public Works, Seattle, Washington.
- Soderberg, Lisa. 1980. "Historic Bridges and Tunnels in Washington State," on file in the Washington State Office of Archaeology and Historic Preservation, Olympia, Washington.

== See also ==
- National Register of Historic Places listings in King County, Washington
