= Kanasket =

Kanasket (alternately spelled Kanaskat) was a chief of the Klickitat people. He was present at the signing of the Treaty of Medicine Creek, and participated in the Puget Sound War, fighting against white settlers and the U.S. Army.

At Medicine Creek, Kanasket protested what he saw as a bad deal for the Nisqually tribe, and told their chief, Leschi (c. 1808-1858). Those present told him to leave, stating "You are half-Klickitat; you have nothing to say; the treaty is made." In September 1855, Kanasket and Chief Leschi met with officials of Washington Territory at Muckleshoot Prairie, but the outcome is not known. Later, after the start of the Puget Sound War, along with Quiemuth (half brother of Leschi, c.1798-1856) of the Mishalpam ("Mashel River People") or Mica'l Band of Nisqually, Chief Kitsap of the Muckleshoot, and Powhowtish, Kanasket was credited with leading a group of 80 warriors that attacked an army camp, killing Lieutenant William A. Slaughter. In this same attack, two corporals and a private were killed, as well as three privates being wounded.

On February 29, 1856, Kanasket was leading a group towards an army camp at Lemmon's Prairie, when they were spotted by a Private Kehl. Kehl shot Kanasket, who was at the lead of the group. Kanasket was paralyzed from the waist down from being shot in the spine. His companions fled, while he was dragged into the camp. Carrying on him a Kentucky rifle, a spear, and a butcher knife, Kanasket attempted to attack with the knife, but was subdued by two men. When one of the soldiers recognized him, Kanasket said in the Chinook Jargon, "Kanasket-Tyee-mamalouse nica-nica mamalouse Bostons" ("I'm Kanasket, chief, kill me, for I kill Bostons"). He reportedly went on to state "My heart is wicked towards the whites, and always will be, and you had better kill me." Silas Casey ordered that he be hung, and he began to yell out in his own language, and Erasmus Keyes presumed he was yelling for help, as two shots had been fired at the camp, so Corporal O'Shaughnessy shot him in the head.

== Legacy ==
Several places bear Kanasket's name. Washington has a settlement called Kanaskat, and a nearby state park titled Kanaskat-Palmer State Park.
