= O'Brien, Washington =

Ghost town in Washington (state)

- Ghost town
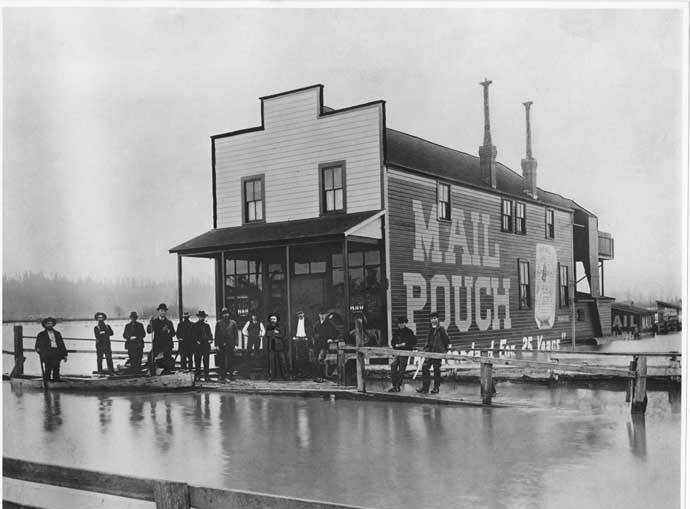
- Flood in O'Brien (1906)

- Location within Washington (state) Location within the United States
- Coordinates: 47°24′44″N 122°14′13″W
- Country: United States
- State: Washington
- County: King
- Time zone: UTC-8 (Pacific (PST))
  - Summer (DST): UTC-7 (PDT)

O'Brien, Washington was a former community, north of Kent in the Green River Valley of King County in the U.S. state of Washington. It was just north of today's Green River Natural Resources Area, on the right bank of the river. At one time, it had a post office and a school.

The community was named after Terrance O'Brien, the original owner of the town site.
