= Cedarhurst, Washington =

- Unincorporated community
- Location in Washington and the United States Cedarhurst (the United States)
- Coordinates: 47°28′55.35″N 122°28′45.47″W
- Country: United States
- State: Washington
- County: King
- Time zone: UTC-8 (Pacific (PST))
  - Summer (DST): UTC-7 (PDT)
- GNIS feature ID: 1510864

Cedarhurst is a unincorporated community in King County, Washington, United States.

A post office called Cedarhurst was established in 1912.
