= Nolte State Park =

State park in Washington (state), United States

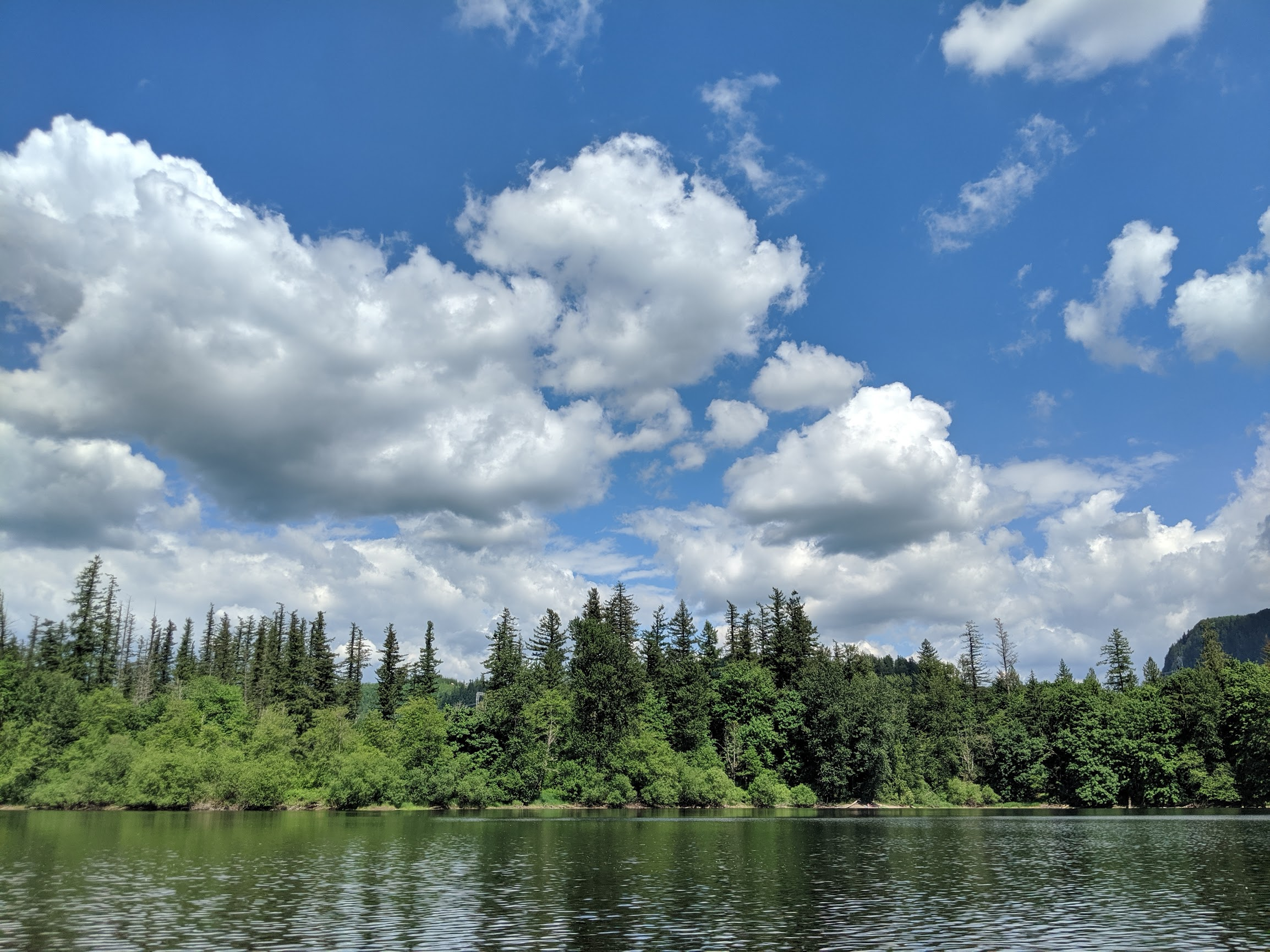

- Location within Washington (state) Location within the United States
- Location: King County, Washington, United States
- Coordinates: 47°16′06″N 121°56′31″W
- Area: 117 acres (47 ha)
- Elevation: 780 ft (240 m)
- Established: 1971
- Administrator: Washington State Parks and Recreation Commission
- Website: Official website

Nolte State Park is a 117-acre (47 ha) Washington state park located 6 miles (9.7 km) northeast of Enumclaw and just south of Cumberland at the western edge of the Cascade Mountains, with 7,174 feet (2,187 m) of shoreline on Deep Lake near the Green River Gorge. The property was a resort for many years before it was donated to the state by Minnie Nolte in 1971. There are rainbow trout, coastal cutthroat trout, kokanee, crappie, and brown bullhead in the lake. The lake has a public fishing pier, beach area, and a hiking trail around the lake. The boat launch is carry-in only with limited parking. Deep Lake has a surface area of 39 acres (16 ha) and reaches a depth of 76 feet (23 m).
