= Kangley, Washington =

Unincorporated community in Washington, United States

- Unincorporated community
- Location in Washington and the United States Kangley (the United States)
- Coordinates: 47°21′43″N 121°52′52″W
- Country: United States
- State: Washington
- County: King
- Elevation: 1,007 ft (307 m)
- Time zone: UTC-8 (Pacific (PST))
  - Summer (DST): UTC-7 (PDT)
- GNIS feature ID: 1521565

Kangley is an unincorporated community in King County, Washington, United States. It is located east of Maple Valley, Washington and north of Kanaskat-Palmer State Park.

Kangley is located 29 miles southeast of Seattle and was on the Northern Pacific and Milwaukee Railroad line. The end of Kent-Kangley Road, Kangley is located 4 miles east of Ravensdale, WA and 2 miles south of Selleck, WA, running from the intersection of Kent-Kangley Rd. and 346th Ave SE north to SE 263rd Place near Brown's Creek.

With its roots in coal, the town formed in the late 1880s and was named for the vice president of the Northern Pacific Coal Co., John Kangley. The Kangley mine, which actually consisted of three different shafts at one time or another, was said to have produced some one of the best coal available, with only about two and a half or three percent ash whereas other mines produced coal with anywhere from 10 to 15 percent. A post office was established at Kangley on June 30, 1890. John Peterson Jr. was the first postmaster. Mail was distributed at the coal mine where Peterson worked. On October 20, 1898, the post office closed for four years. The Post Office reopened on February 28, 1903. When it reopened John Lavender was postmaster. The mail was distributed from Lavender's store. On March 4, 1910, the post office name changed to Selleck. An area near Lavender's store, in between Kangley and Selleck, was called Lavender Town. The Post Office was ultimately closed and its Zip Code 98064 was consolidated into Ravensdale, WA 98051.

Coal mining operations began to curtail in 1912–1914, and being the property of the Northern Pacific Coal Co., most of the homes in Kangley were collapsed and shipped via train to Roslyn, WA. where mining operations were beginning to boom. Few original mining houses remain, primarily on SE 268th Place.

One staple of later Kangley life was Truman's Country Store which was located at the corner of SE 268th St. and 348th Ave SE. The owner of the combination country store, gas station and tavern, Truman Nelson, came to Kangley in 1965 and could regularly be seen driving his golf cart up and down 346th Ave SE. The closure of Truman's Country Store in the 1980s marked the end of commercial business in Kangley and shortly thereafter the area was no longer referred to as a distinct town.
