= Spring Glen, Washington =

Unincorporated community in Washington, United States

- Unincorporated community
- Location in Washington and the United States Spring Glen (the United States)
- Coordinates: 47°33′40″N 121°51′41″W
- Country: United States
- State: Washington
- County: King
- Elevation: 157 ft (48 m)
- Time zone: UTC-8 (Pacific (PST))
  - Summer (DST): UTC-7 (PDT)
- ZIP codes: 98022
- GNIS feature ID: 1526417

Spring Glen is an unincorporated community in King County, Washington.
