= Eagle Gorge =

Valley in the United States

Coordinates: 47°15′40″N 121°45′43″W

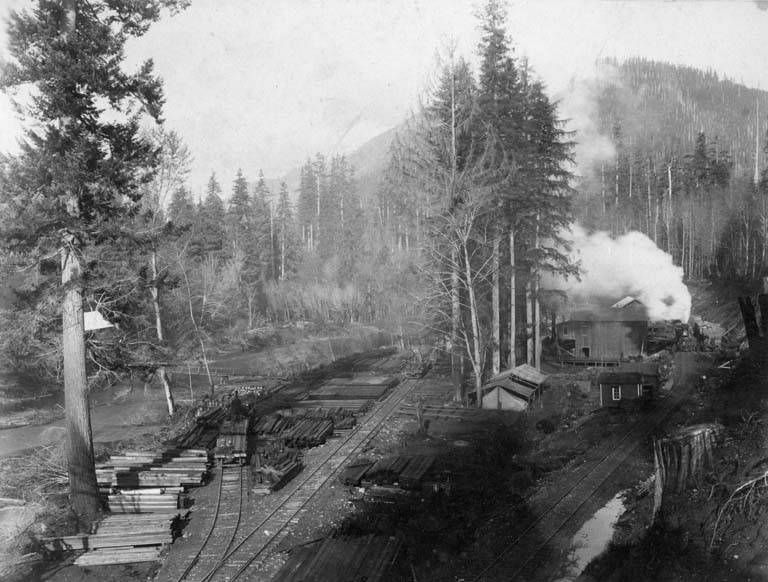
Materials yard for the Northern Pacific Railway Company, Eagle Gorge, 1887

Eagle Gorge is a valley in the U.S. state of Washington.

Eagle Gorge was named for the fact eagles nest in the area.
