= Howard A. Hanson Dam =

Coordinates: 47°16′40″N 121°47′15″W

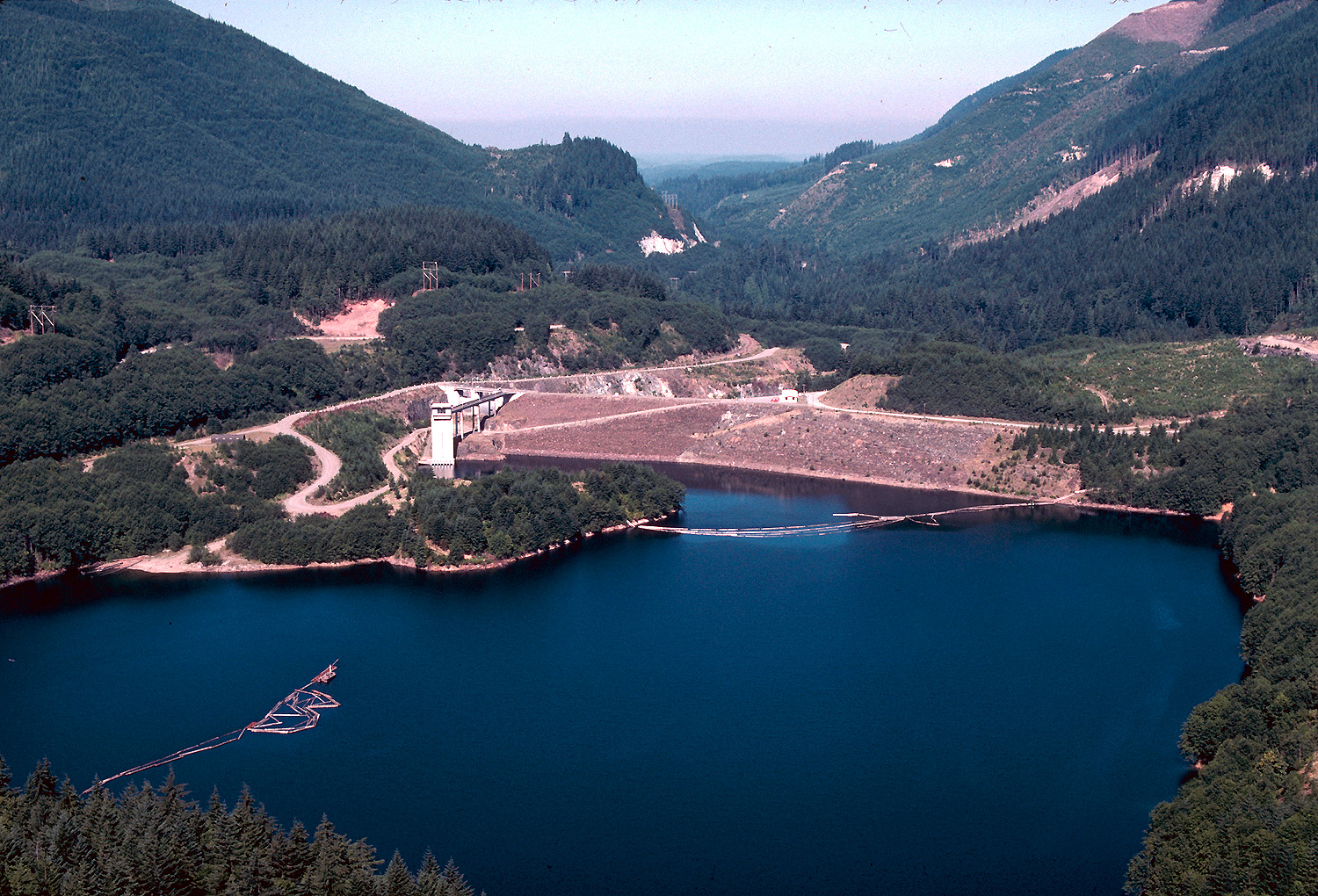
- Howard A. Hanson Dam (rear)
- Interactive map of Howard A. Hanson Dam
- Location: King County, Washington, USA
- Construction began: 1959
- Opening date: 1961
- Operator: U.S. Army Corps of Engineers

Dam and spillways
- Impounds: Green River
- Height: 235 ft (72 m)
- Length: 675 ft (206 m)
- Width (crest): 23 ft (7 m)
- Width (base): 960 ft (292 m)
- Spillway type: Service, controlled
- Spillway capacity: 107,000 cubic feet per second (3,000 m^{3}/s)

Reservoir
- Creates: Howard A. Hanson Reservoir/Pool
- Total capacity: 106,000 acre⋅ft (131,000,000 m^{3})
- Catchment area: 220 square miles (570 km^{2})

Howard A. Hanson Dam is an earthen embankment dam on the Green River, 21 miles (34 km) east of Auburn, Washington. The dam was completed in 1961 and its primary purpose is flood control along with water supply for Tacoma, Washington.

After the dam's reservoir reached record levels in January 2009, the U.S. Army Corps of Engineers discovered seepage in the right abutment of the dam, leading to efforts to mitigate a potential flood. Improved drainage works were completed in October 2011 and although studies are still underway, the dam was declared safe to maintain its maximum reservoir level.

== History and construction ==
The Green River Valley was settled in the 1850s and became a notable farming area, until an aphid infestation destroyed the large hop crop in 1890. Since then, the area mainly consisted of dairy and berry farms, but farmers had to cope with yearly floods. These floods would lead to log jams, redirecting the Green and other rivers. Sometimes farmers would clear log jams with dynamite which led to the flooding of other farms. To deal with the matter, the Associated Improvement Clubs of South King County was formed in 1926. The association created several dikes and repaired river courses but they would soon realize more help was needed.

It was not until 1936 that community leaders, citizens and with additional effort by Congress, the U.S. Army Corps of Engineers (USACE), Seattle District began to search for a suitable flood control project site on the Green River. The selection was delayed by the Second World War and finally in 1949, Eagle Gorge was recommended to Congress as a site for a dam and reservoir project.

In 1955, funds were appropriated for the project; Congress gave $37 million, Washington State $1.5 million and King County provided $500,000. Construction on the dam which included the relocation of 13 miles (21 km) of the Northern Pacific Railway began in February 1959. During construction in December 1959, the last devastating flood occurred on the Green River; damaging homes and removing topsoil from farms. Despite this, the dam was completed almost five months ahead of time on Christmas Day, 1961. The completion of the dam ended a 70-year era of flooding in the Green River Valley and by 1996, the dam had prevented an estimated $694 million in flood damages.

The dam was originally named the Eagle Gorge Dam but was renamed by Congress in 1958 to the Howard A. Hanson Dam. Hanson led civic and government groups in an effort to construct the dam. He was largely instrumental in obtaining funding for the dam. Hanson died in 1957 before construction began.

== Characteristics ==
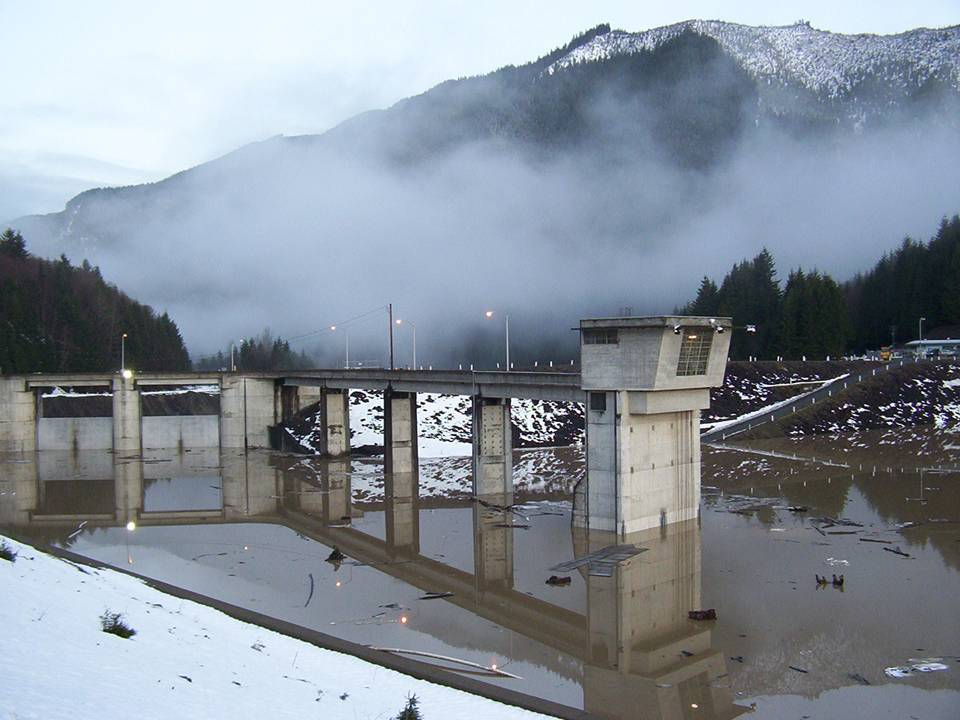
Howard A. Hanson Dam, spillway gates and intake

The Howard A. Hanson Dam is an earthen embankment structure at a length of 675 ft (205 m) and height of 235 ft (70 m). The base of the dam is 960 ft (290 m) wide and sits within Eagle Gorge, a ravine with nearly vertical rock walls. The reservoir withheld by the dam collects water from 220 square miles (570 km^{2}) of drainage area; it is 7 miles (11 km) long. The dam structure contains a concrete spillway on its left side capable of discharging overflow at 107,000 cubic feet per second (3,000 m^{3}/s). The spillway is controlled by two 45 x 30 ft (15 x 6 m) Tainter gates while an outlet tunnel at the base of the dam is controlled by two 10 x 12 ft (3 x 4 m) Tainter gates.

The dam serves its flood control purpose during the rainy season collecting and then controlling the release of flood waters through the base outlet tunnel. This process occurs as often as necessary and in the event of an extreme flood, the spillway can be used. However, spillway use has never been required. In March, the dam serves to conserve water and during the summer, releases specific amounts to assist in fish migration and spawning along with enhancing sports fishing. During the winter, the reservoir is kept near empty. The dam is located within the Tacoma watershed and public access is not allowed, creating controversy among recreation proponents for some time. Water released from the dam is diverted into a water purification facility 3 miles (5 km) downstream for civil consumption.

== Flooding concerns ==
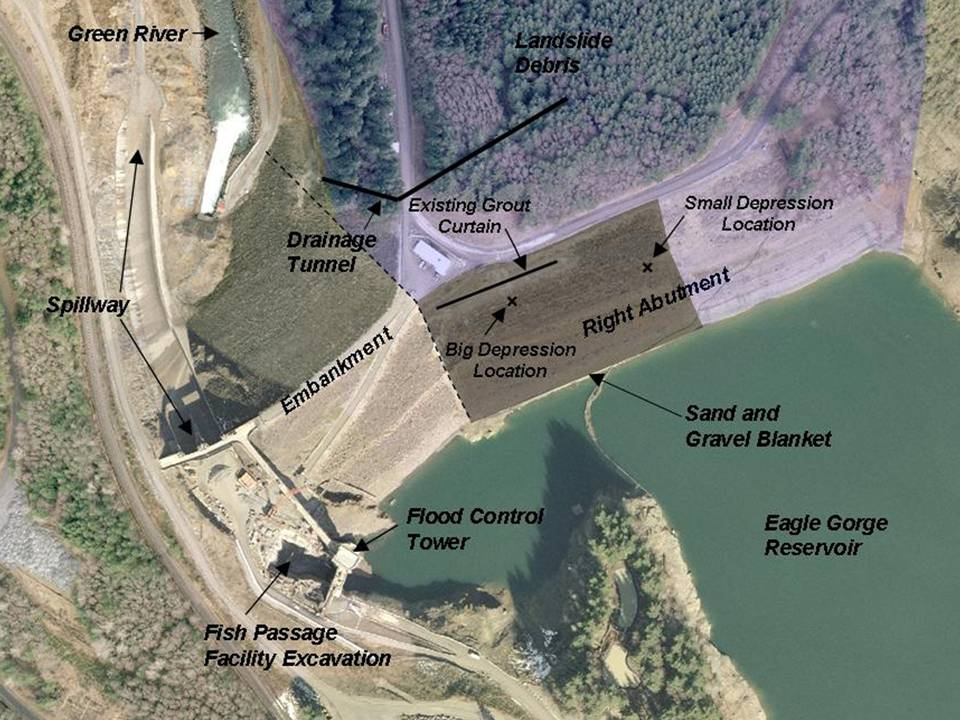
Howard A. Hanson Dam USACE annotated aerial photo

In January 2009, 15 inches (380 mm) of rainfall within 24 hours peaked water inflows behind the reservoir at 30,500 cubic feet per second (860 m^{3}/s), raising the reservoir level to a record high of 1,189 feet (362 m) above sea level. In comparison, the maximum authorized storage level is 1,206 feet (368 m) above sea level and the normal summer level is 1,167 feet (356 m). The Howard A. Hanson dam had controlled and prevented a flood that would have caused an estimated $4 billion in damages.

However, soon after the flood the USACE discovered two depressions on the right abutment of the dam, increased water levels in groundwater monitoring wells and the appearance of sediment-laden water entering the abutment drainage tunnel. The USACE did not believe the dam was at immediate risk of failing but assessed increased danger to downstream communities until the problem was resolved. The USACE began to lower and restrict the elevation of the dam's reservoir. In addition, by November 2009, the USACE constructed an interim seepage barrier along with improving the drainage of the right abutment. These actions were estimated to reduce the chance of flooding from a 1 in 3 to a 1 in 25 chance during 2010.

The level of the reservoir was restricted due to increased chances for flooding downstream. In the event of a major flood, increased releases may cause water to over-top downstream levees. Sandbags were distributed throughout the Green River Valley as the USACE continued to inspect, monitor and repair the dam. After improvements to the dam's drainage works were completed in October 2011, the dam was declared able to hold its maximum storage level. Previously in the summer, the reservoir reached normal summer levels. A full study of the dam is still underway and is expected to be published in 2013.

== See also ==
- Green River
