= Krain, Washington =

Ghost town in Washington (state)

- Ghost town
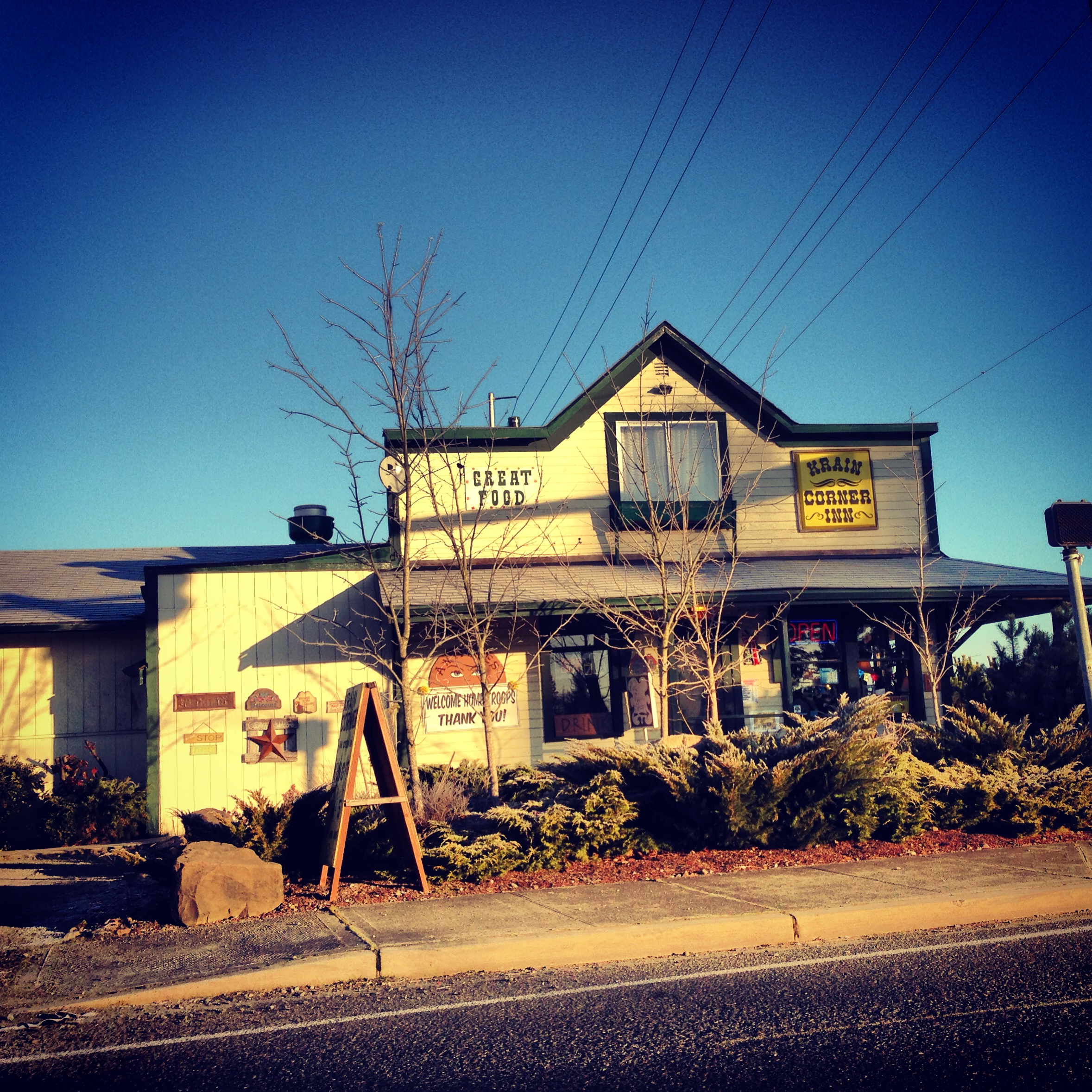
- Krain Corner Inn (Enumclaw, WA)

- Location within Washington (state) Location within the United States
- Coordinates: 47°14′34″N 121°59′21″W
- Country: United States
- State: Washington
- County: King
- Elevation: 686 ft (209 m)
- Time zone: UTC-8 (Pacific (PST))
  - Summer (DST): UTC-7 (PDT)
- GNIS feature ID: 1521769

Krain was an unincorporated community in south King County, Washington, just north of Enumclaw. The area (also often referred to as Krain Corner) now centers on the intersection of SR 169 and SE 400th St. An inn and restaurant has been located at the corner since 1916, and the nearby Holy Family Krain Cemetery dates back to at least 1901.
