= Green River (Duwamish River tributary) =

Tributary of the Duwamish River in Washington, United States

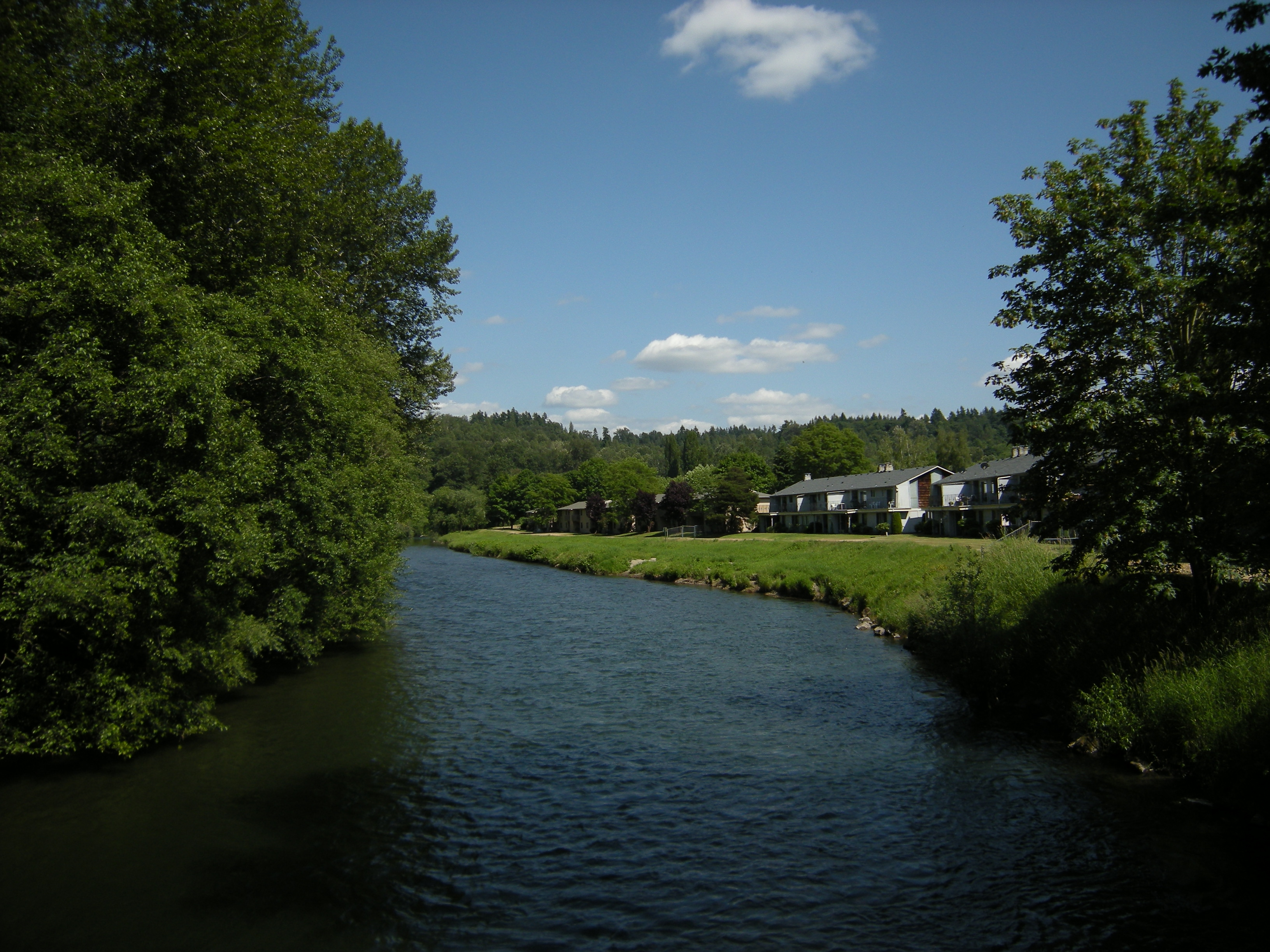
- Looking upriver from suspension bridge in Isaac Evans Park, Auburn, Washington

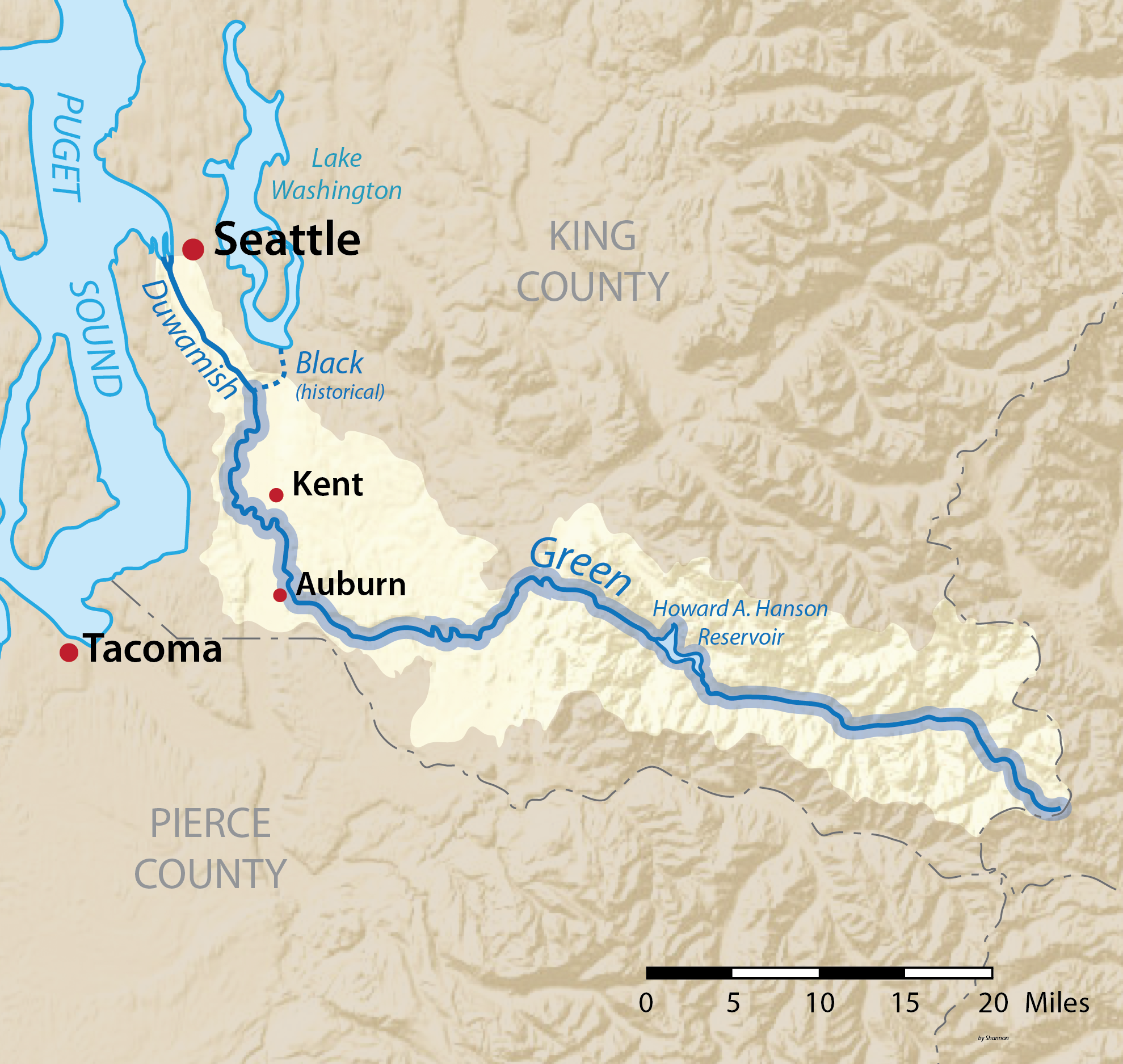
- Map of the Duwamish/Green River watershed with the Green River highlighted

- Location of the mouth of the Duwamish River in Washington Green River (Duwamish River tributary) (the United States)

Location
- Country: United States
- State: Washington
- County: King
- Cities: Auburn, Kent, Tukwila

Physical characteristics
- Source: Cascade Range
  - coordinates: 47°8′N 121°18′W
  - elevation: 3,283 ft (1,001 m)
- Mouth: Duwamish River
  - coordinates: 47°28′N 122°15′W
  - elevation: 57 ft (17 m)
- Length: 65 mi (105 km)
- Basin size: 440 sq mi (1,100 km^{2})
- Discharge
  - location: Auburn, Washington
  - average: 1,316 cu ft/s (37.3 m^{3}/s)
  - minimum: 81 cu ft/s (2.3 m^{3}/s)
  - maximum: 28,100 cu ft/s (800 m^{3}/s)

The Green River is a 65-mile (105 km) long river in the state of Washington in the United States, arising on the western slopes of the Cascade Range south of Interstate 90.

The upper Green River valley forms the western approach to Stampede Pass, and was once home to many small railroad and logging towns such as Weston, Lester, Green River Hot Springs, Nagrom, Maywood, Humphreys, Eagle Gorge, Lemolo, and Kanaskat. Shortly before World War I, the City of Tacoma, Washington filed for water rights on the Green River. Today, much of the upper valley has become a gated water supply watershed for Tacoma and access is heavily restricted, creating controversy among recreation enthusiasts.

Between 1880 and 1888, the Northern Pacific Railway explored and surveyed the Green River. The railway constructed the first direct rail link across Washington's Cascade Range with the opening of their Stampede Tunnel in 1888.

== History ==
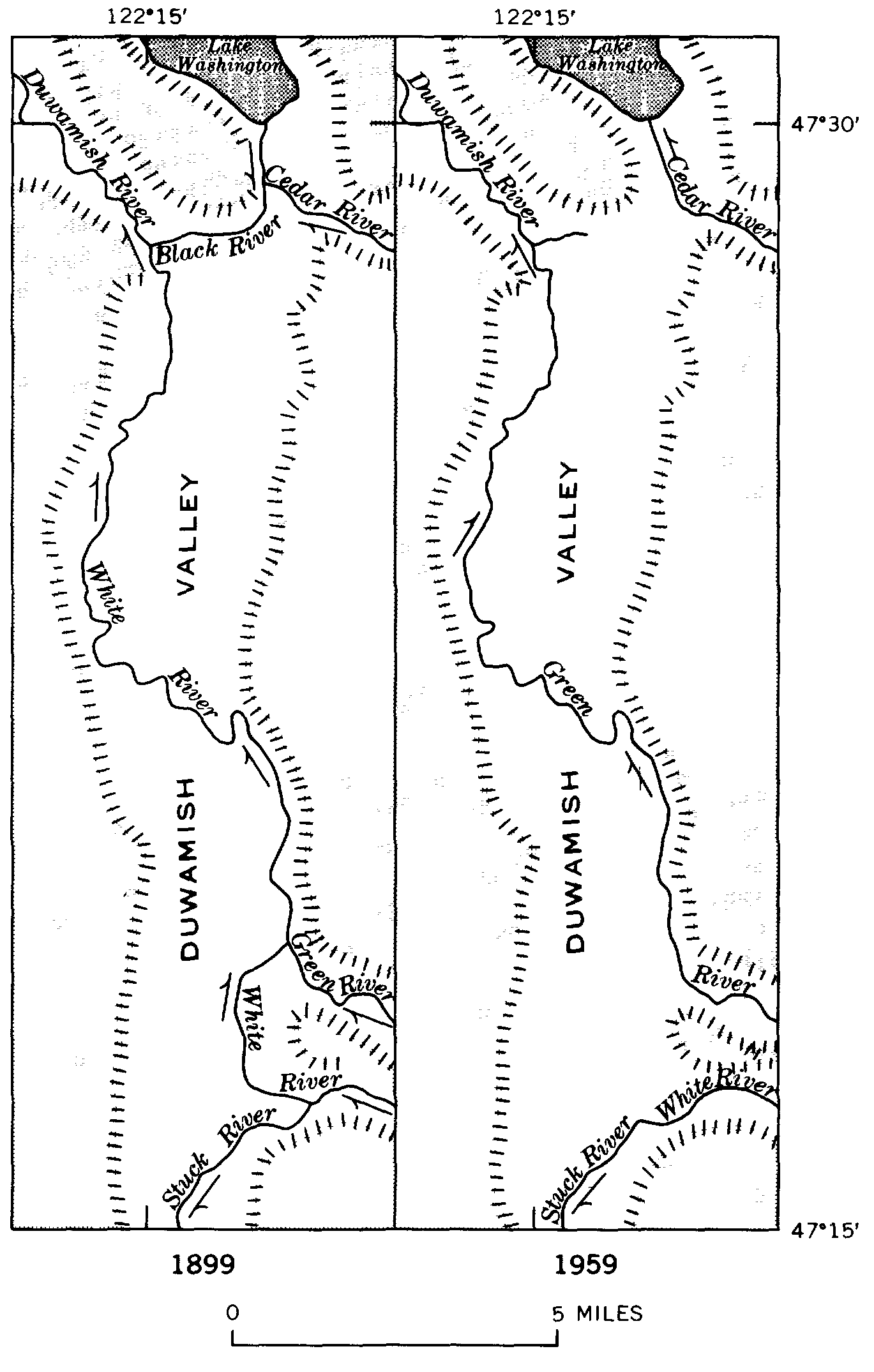
Maps showing the changes of course and nomenclature of rivers in the Duwamish Valley, 1899-1959.

Until 1906, the Green River flowed into the White in downtown Auburn. In 1906, however, the White River changed course above Auburn following a major flood and emptied into the Puyallup River as it does today. The lower portion of the historic White River—from historic confluence of the White and Green Rivers to the historic confluence with the Black River at Tukwila that forms the Duwamish—is now considered part of the Green River. Then, with the opening of the Lake Washington Ship Canal in 1916, the lake's level dropped nearly nine feet and the Black River dried up. From that time forward, the point of the name change from Green to Duwamish is no longer a confluence of rivers, though it has not changed location. Thus, the Green River now becomes the Duwamish River, flowing into the industrialized estuary known as the Duwamish Waterway and thence Elliott Bay in Seattle. By contrast, the White turns south at Auburn, and flows into the Puyallup River and later Commencement Bay in Tacoma.

In October 2009, giant sandbags were placed along the levee from Fort Dent through Kent and the Green River Trail was closed to cyclists. The sandbags mitigated the flood potential due to a weakness discovered in the Howard A. Hanson Dam following a January 2009 storm. Repairs strengthening the partially earthen dam by the Army Corps of Engineers have reduced this flood threat significantly. In September 2012, the Green River Trail was reopened following the removal of all giant sandbags.

== Course ==
Most of the river above and including Eagle Gorge Reservoir are part of the Green River Watershed, which is closed to public access, creating controversy among recreation proponents for some time. West of the Green River Watershed at Kanaskat, the river passes through the Green River Gorge with cliffs rising sharply as much as 300 feet (91 m) from the riverbed. Flaming Geyser State Park, Nolte State Park, and Kanaskat-Palmer State Park are located in this area. The river is a popular tubing spot in the Summer.

Downstream from the Green River Gorge is the half-mile wide Green River Valley, where farmland has been protected from development. An attempt to locate a bike trail along the valley walls has encountered fierce resistance from farmers. As a result, bikes must share the road with autos as it winds through the pastoral landscape.

At Auburn, the Green River emerges from the Green River Valley and enters the much larger Auburn/Kent Valley, which was created by glacial action during the Pleistocene ice ages, then filled in by river sediments and lahars from Mount Rainier. After flowing generally west from its source, at Auburn the river turns north, entering a zone of light-industrial and retail development. A public multiuse trail runs along the river through most of this valley.

== Tributaries ==
- Big Soos Creek
- Covington Creek
- Crisp Creek
- Jenkins Creek
- Little Soos Creek
- Longfellow Creek
- Mill Creek
- Newaukum Creek
- Springbrook Creek

== Green River Killer ==
The Green River is infamous as the location where the first victims of serial killer Gary Ridgway were found in the early 1980s. Most of these victims were sex workers that worked an active "stroll" along Pacific Highway South. Although only a few bodies were found in the river, the unidentified killer was known as the "Green River Killer". These murders went unsolved for over 20 years. For many years, Dave Reichert led the investigation as a detective of the King County Sheriff's Office. Ridgway made a plea agreement with King County Prosecuting Attorney Norm Maleng to cooperate with police in order to escape execution. In November 2003, Gary Ridgway pleaded guilty to 48 counts of Aggravated First Degree Murder. King County Superior Court Judge Richard A. Jones sentenced Ridgway to 48 consecutive life sentences. Ridgway will never be eligible for parole.

== See also ==
- List of rivers in Washington
- Patton Bridge (Auburn, Washington)
