= Lester, Washington =

Ghost town in Washington (state)

- Ghost town
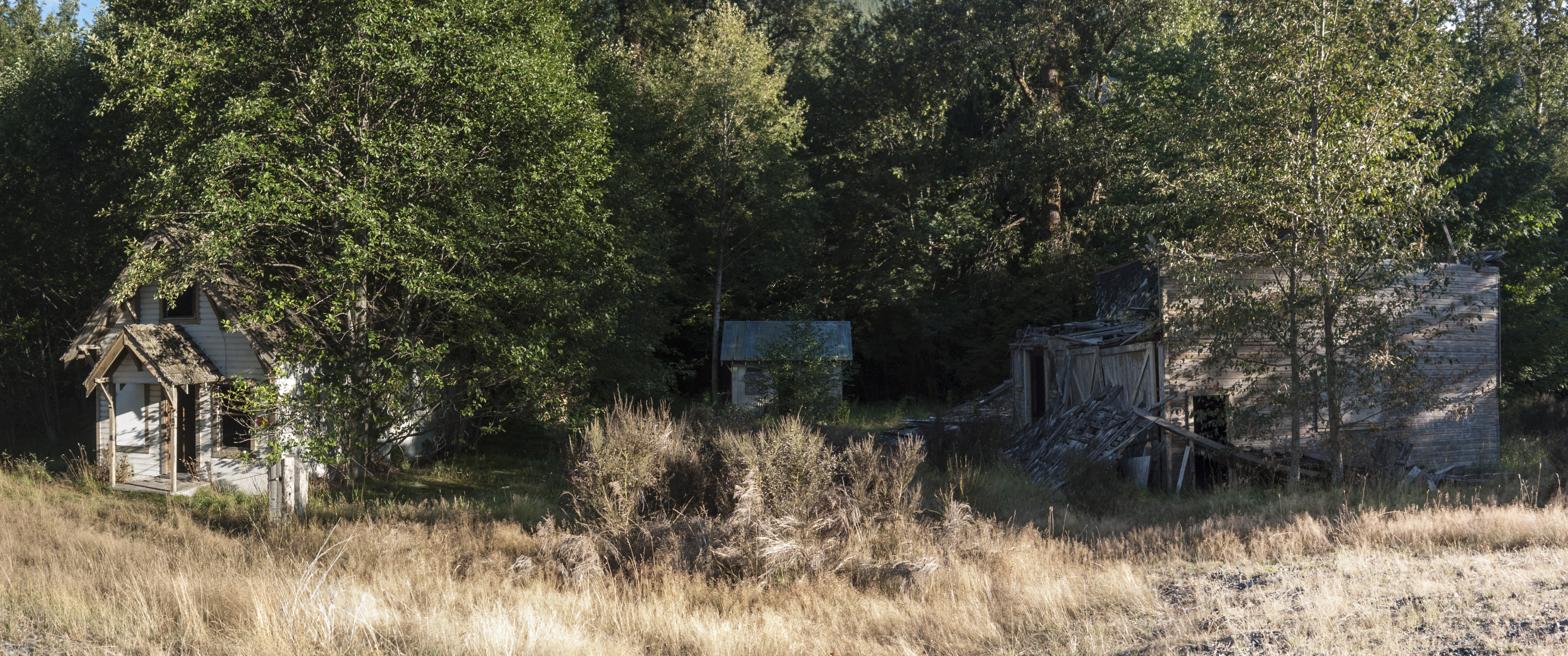
- Guard house, gas and oil shack, and warehouse in Lester

- Location within Washington (state) Location within the United States
- Coordinates: 47°12.55′N 121°29.64′W
- Established: 1892
- Elevation: 1,634 ft (498 m)

Population (1984)
  - Total: 0

Lester is a ghost town near Stampede Pass, just south of Snoqualmie Pass in King County, founded in 1892 by the Northern Pacific Railway (now the BNSF Railway). Lester is located along what is currently National Forest Development Road 54, on land now owned by Tacoma Water, a division of Tacoma Public Utilities.

Although most remaining freestanding buildings were demolished in 2017, numerous foundations from the settlement remain.

== History ==
Lester was founded in 1891 as the logging camp of "Deans", named after the owner of Dean's Lumber Company. In 1886, the Northern Pacific Railway constructed a large depot, roundhouse, coal dock and other steam locomotive support facilities for the Stampede Pass railway; the town was at the foot of the railroad's maximum grade. It was later renamed "Lester" in honor of Northern Pacific telegraph operator Lester Hansaker.

In 1902, a series of forest fires devastated the local logging industry, but Lester continued to thrive as a company town for Northern Pacific Railway. In the 1920s, the town's population peaked at approximately 1,000, and most of the modern structures in Lester were built during the decade. During the 1940s and 1950s, the town transitioned away from railroading and towards logging, with new camps established at Lester by Soundview Pulp Company, later acquired by Scott Paper Company.

The city of Tacoma began purchasing property in Lester in 1963, seeking to protect the Green River watershed where the city sources its drinking water. Tacoma attempted to block access to the town and the state trust land in the Green river basin, leading to protests and the destruction of gates on the only all-weather road leading to Lester, in an incident known as the "Battle of the Lester Gate". King County sued the city of Tacoma over blocking access to Lester, arguing that the road was owned by the county. In July 1962, the King County Superior Court ruled in Tacoma's favor to temporarily keep locks on its Lester gates. In 1965, the court determined that the county's failure to include other landowners in the suit hampered the court's abilities to adjudicate the case.

In April 1978, the Scott camp at Lester, one of the last in King County, was closed; by March 1979, the population of the town had dropped to 22. The mothballing of the Stampede Pass rail line by Burlington Northern in 1984 led to further abandonment of Lester, with the city of Tacoma and United States Forest Service restricting access to residents and their guests. Lester residents and railroad buffs attempted to designate the town's railroad depot as a historic landmark in 1983, when it was threatened with possible demolition, and was nearly moved to North Bend to preserve it. The depot was eventually destroyed by an arson fire.

In 1985, the Washington State Legislature passed a law that dissolved school districts with fewer than five students, leading to the disbandment of the Lester school district. A mock funeral was held for the town by residents in response to the closure of the school.

Lester's last resident, Gertrude Murphy, died in September 2002 at the age of 99.

Telephone numbers in the town began with the prefix 657. The switch that served the town, a North Electric CX-100, is preserved at the Museum of Communications in Seattle. A small switching building, with (now defunct) US West painted on its door, still exists in Lester.

For public safety and watershed security, the remaining buildings in Lester (consisting of the guard house, gas and oil shack, and warehouse) were demolished by Tacoma Water in 2017. Some smaller traces of the town still exist. Tacoma water continues to block access to state trust lands within the Green river watershed.

== Geography ==
Lester is located, east of Enumclaw, Washington along the Green River and BNSF Railway line. Its elevation is 1,634 feet (498 m) above sea level.

== Gallery ==
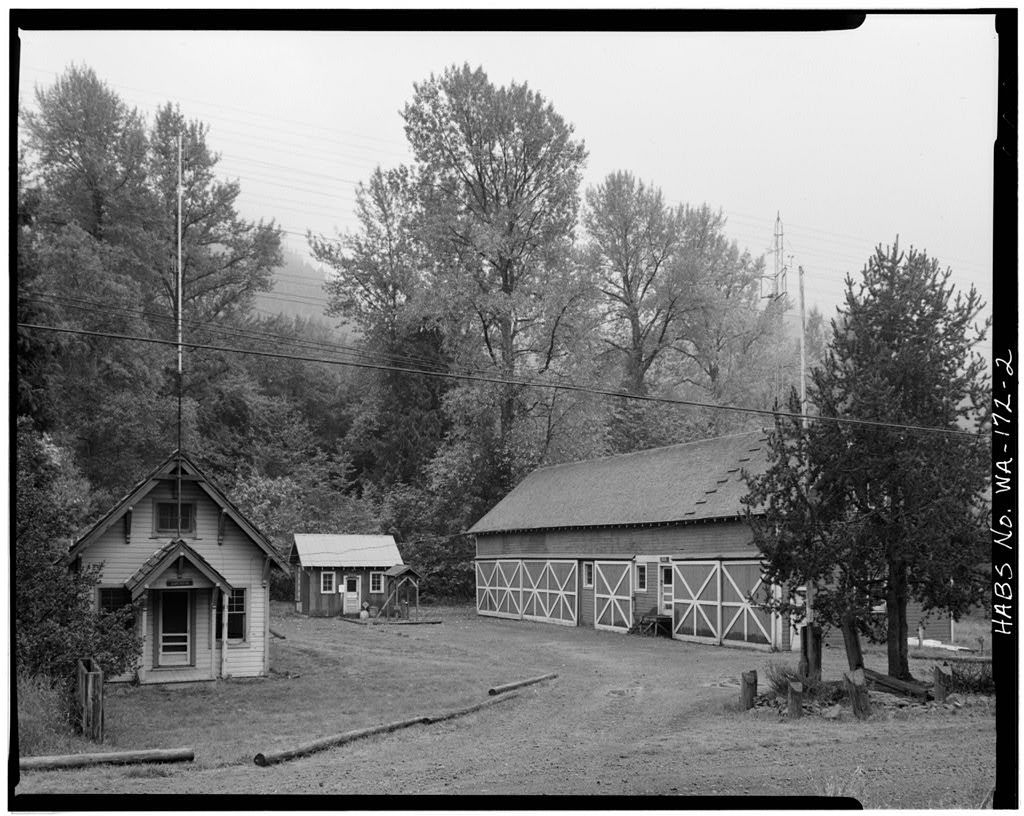
Lester, WA: c. 1984

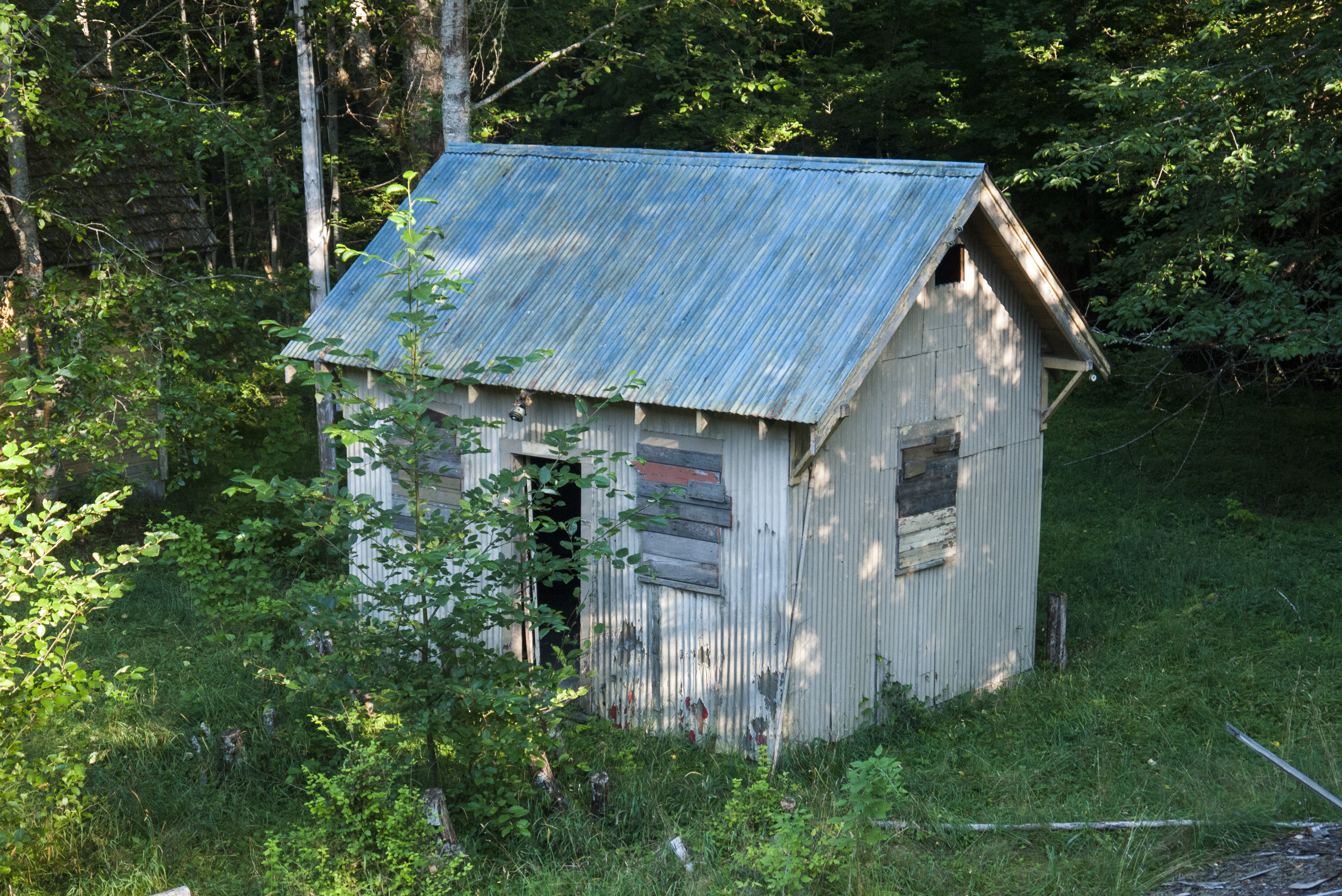

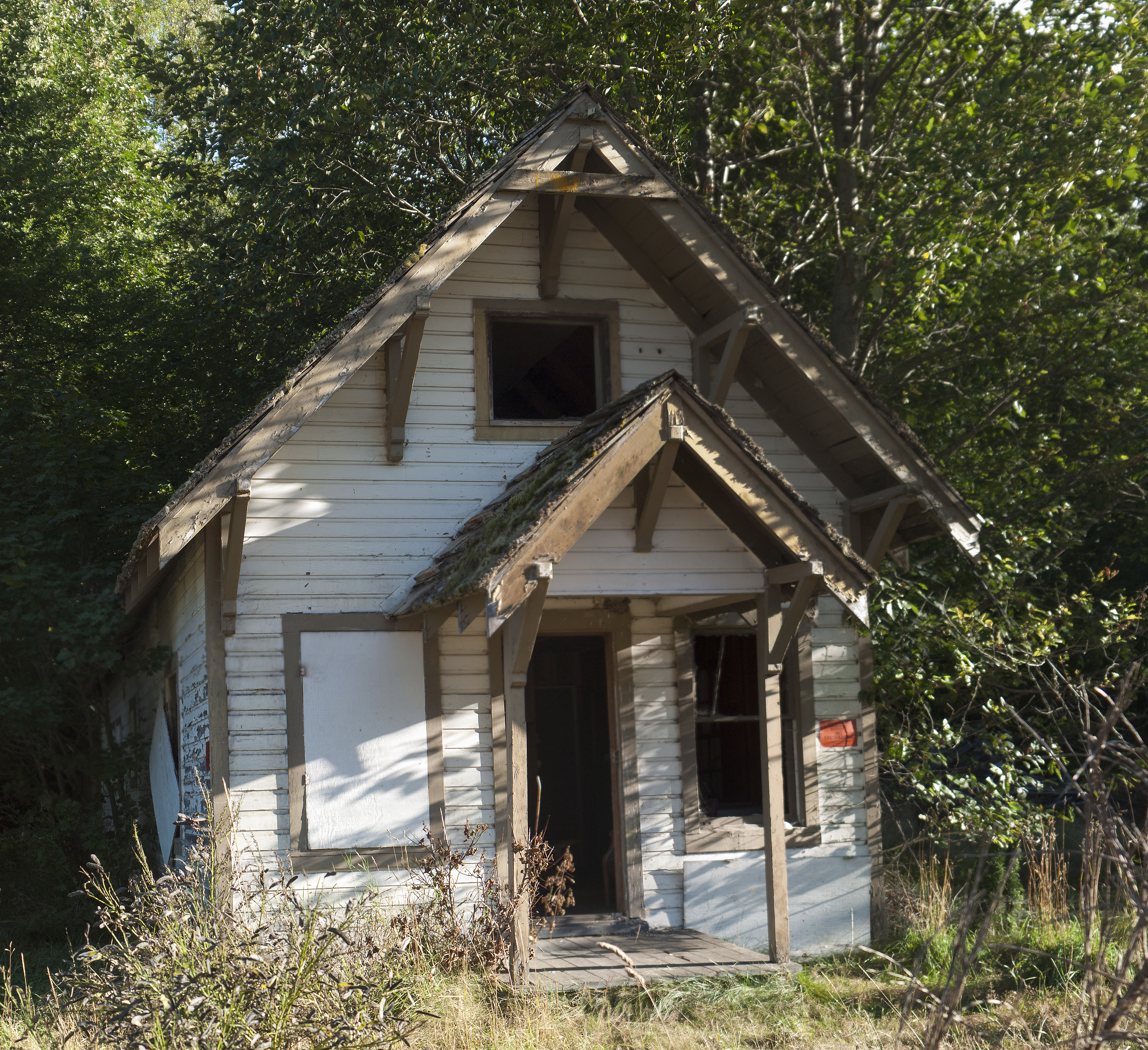

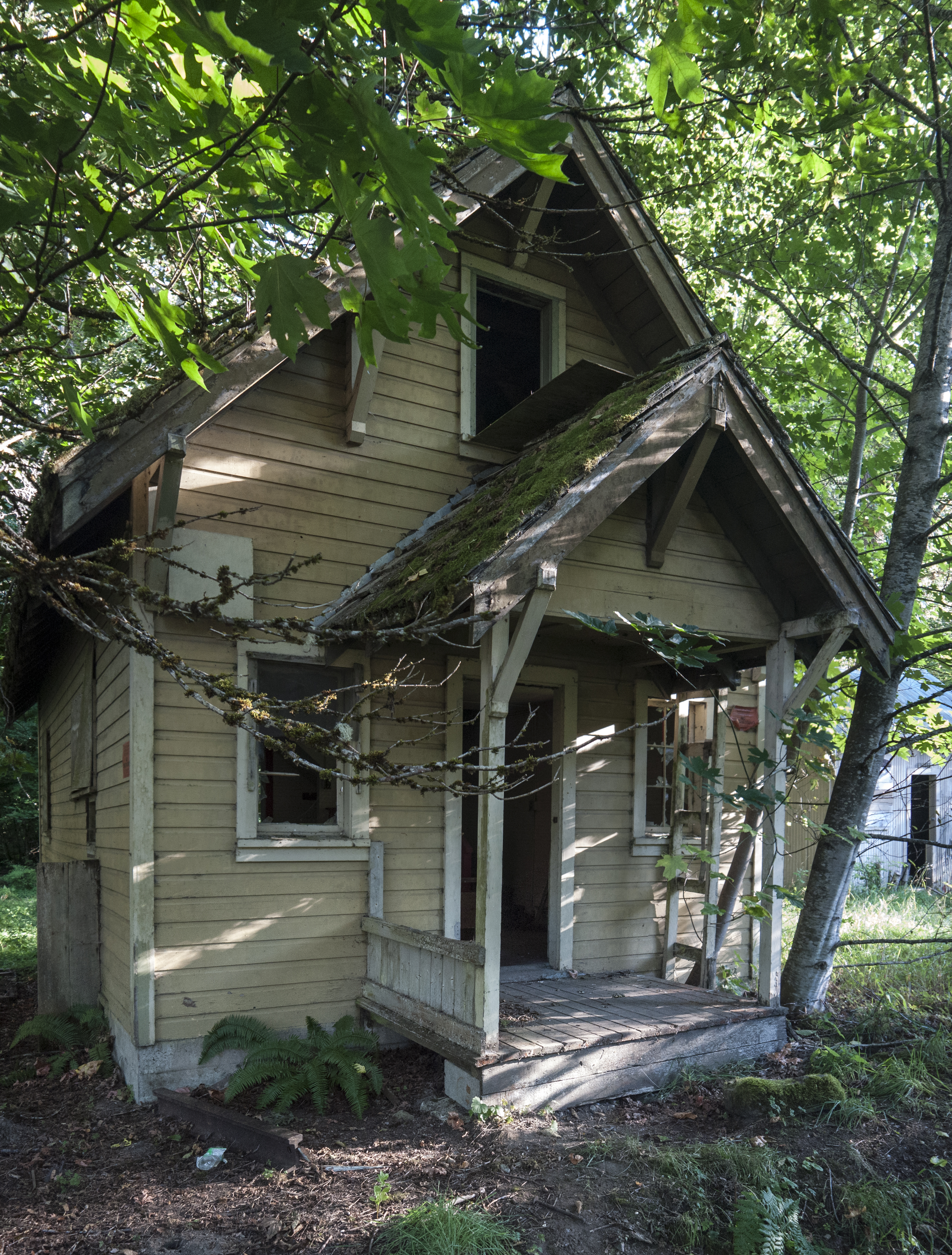

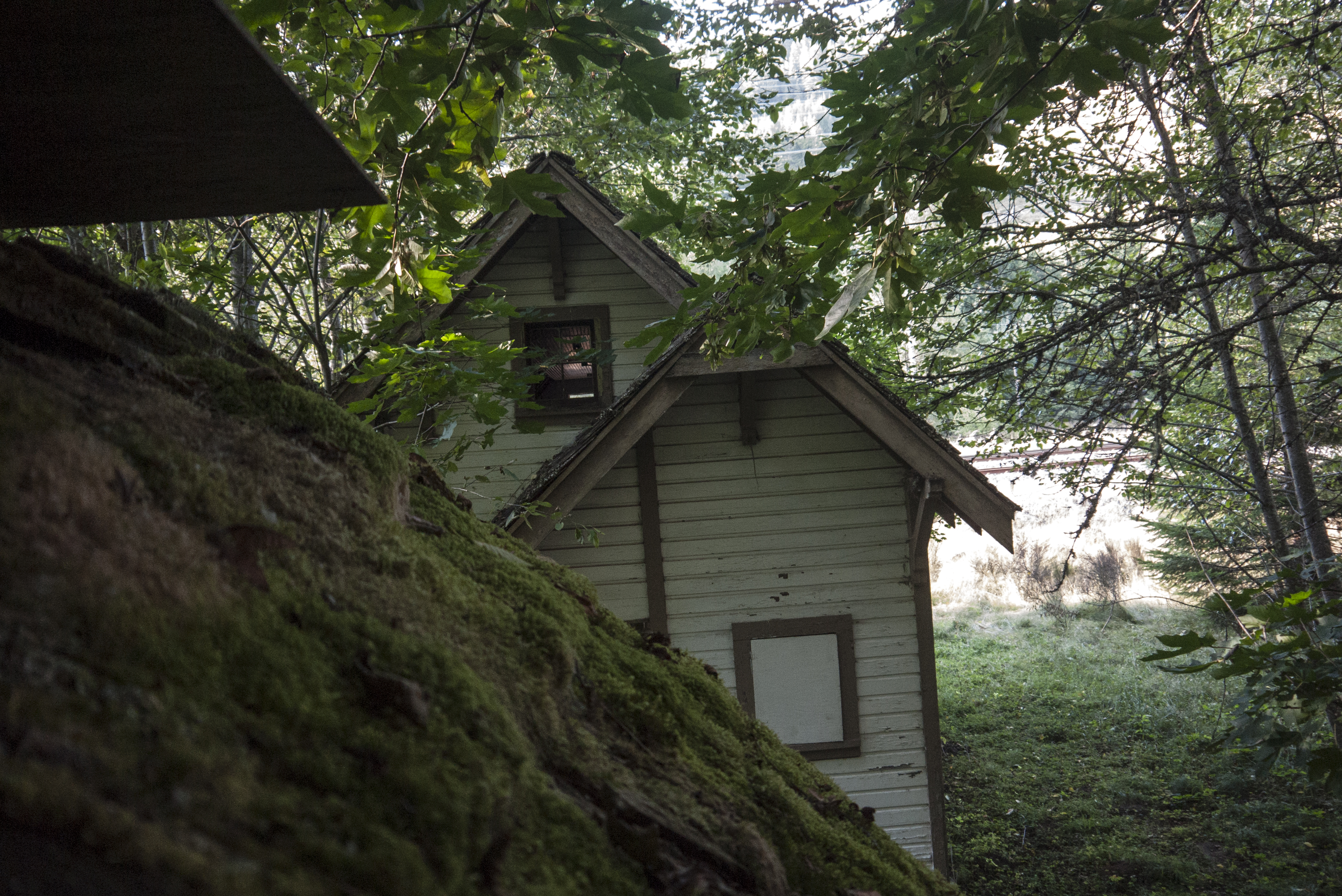

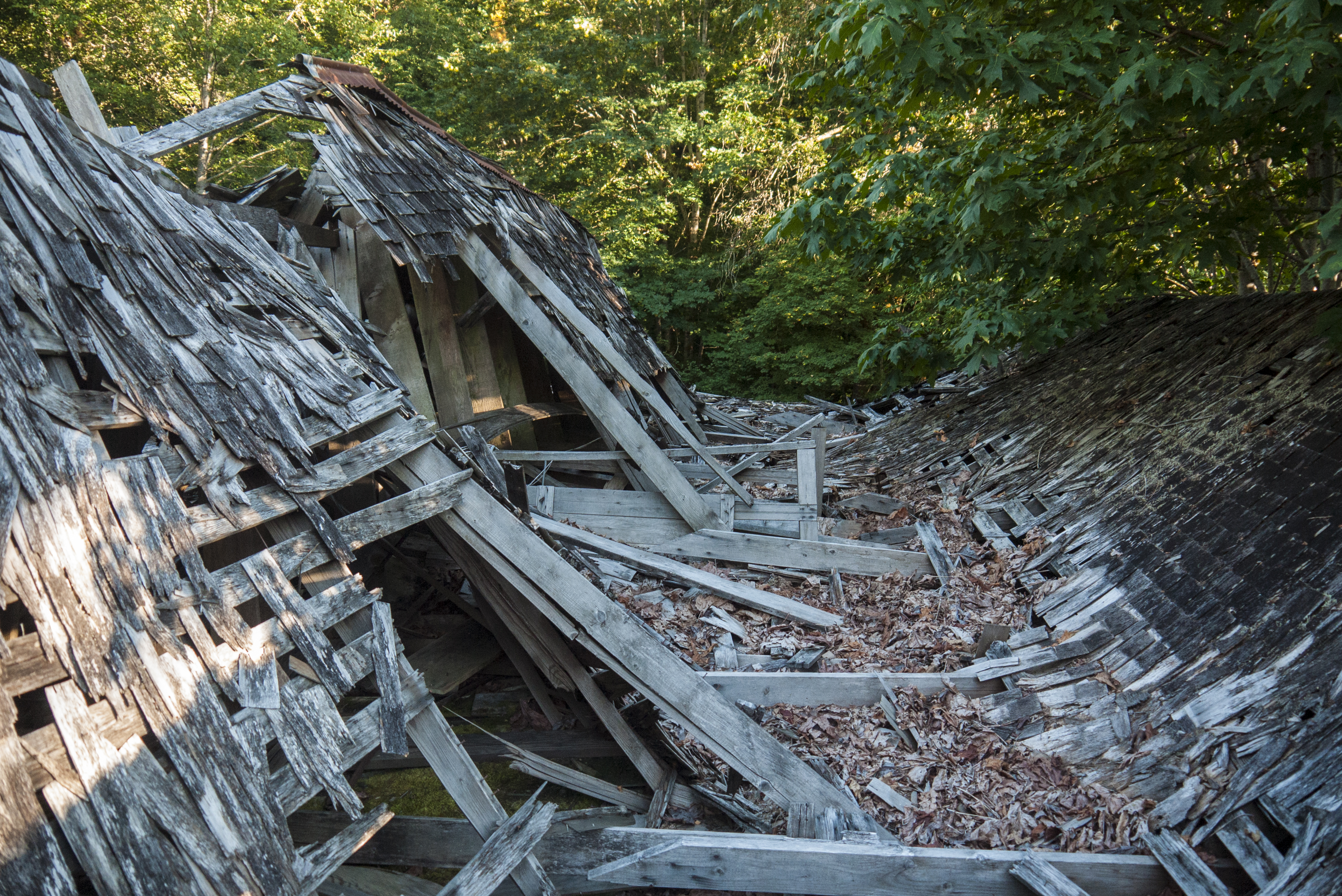

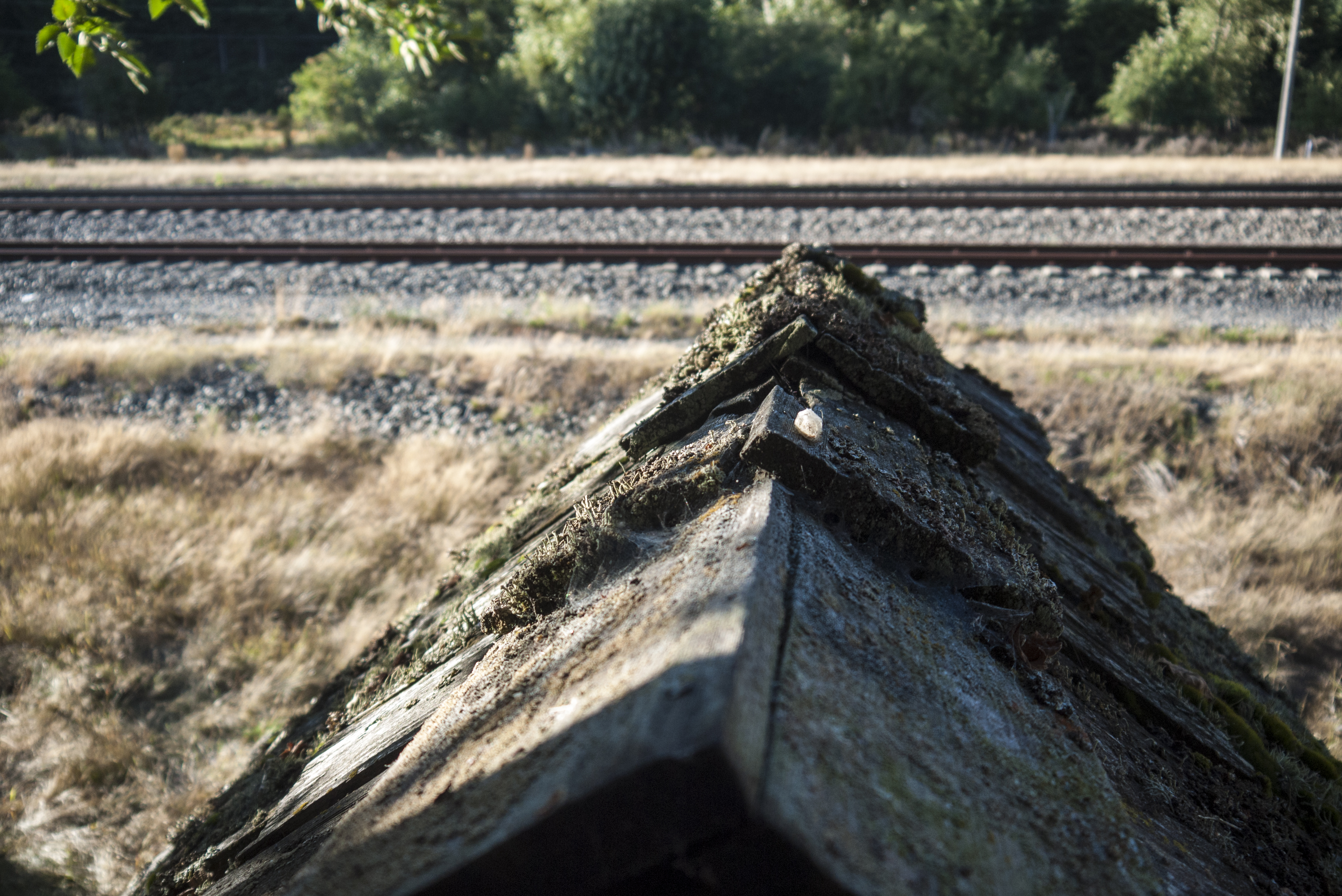
