= Kanaskat-Palmer State Park =

State park in Washington (state), US

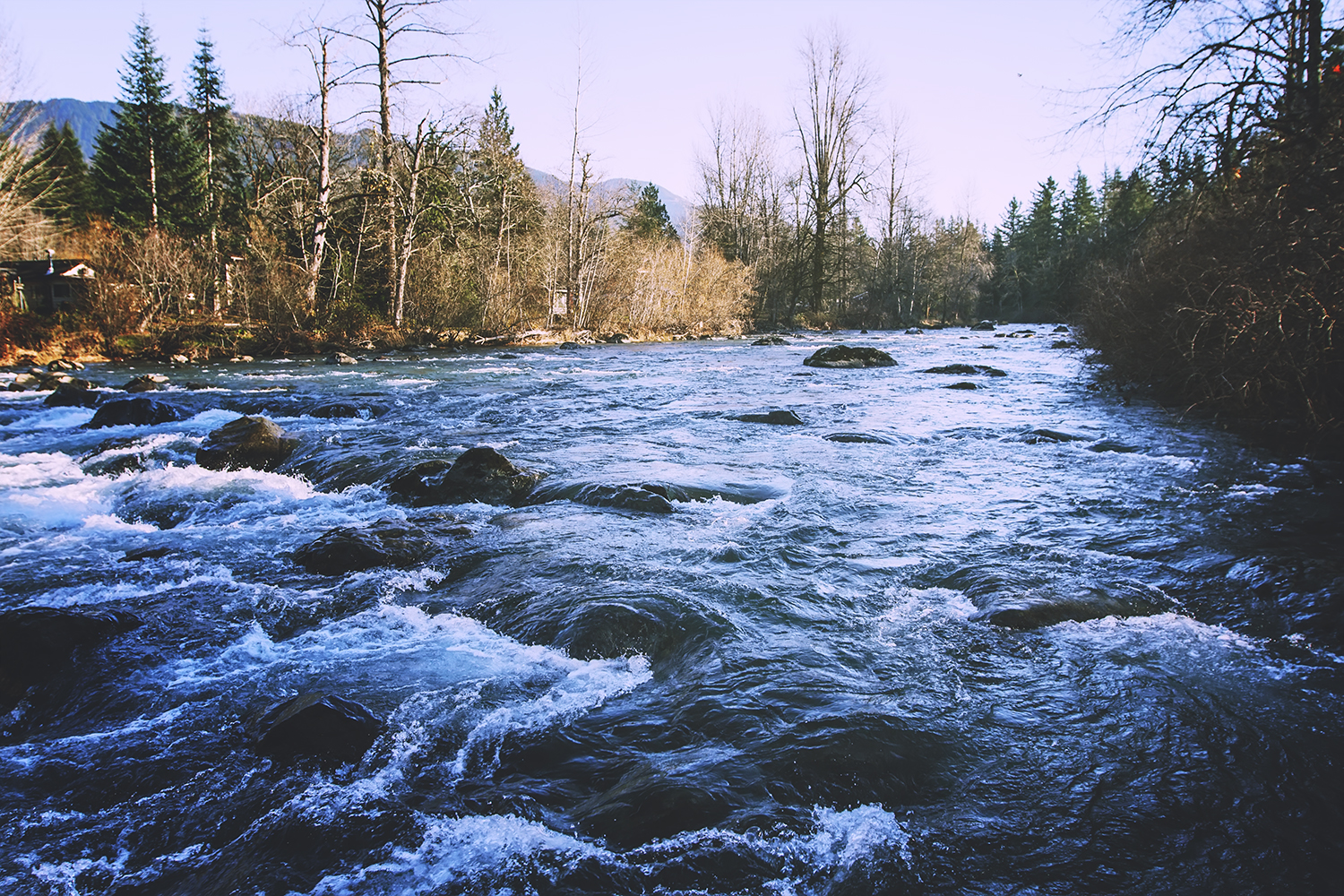
- The Green River at Kanaskat-Palmer State Park

- Location within Washington (state) Location within the United States
- Location: King County, Washington, United States
- Coordinates: 47°18′44″N 121°53′56″W
- Area: 320 acres (130 ha)
- Elevation: 804 ft (245 m)
- Established: 1973 (purchase); 1983 (dedication)
- Administrator: Washington State Parks and Recreation Commission
- Website: Official website

Kanaskat-Palmer State Park is a 320-acre (130 ha) Washington state park on the Green River in King County. The park has 2 miles (3.2 km) of river shoreline and offers picnicking, camping, 3 miles (4.8 km) of trails for hiking and biking, expert-level rafting and kayaking in the Green River Gorge, fishing, swimming, birdwatching, wildlife viewing, and horseshoes.

The area has been used for mining in the past, and surrounding areas are still used in mining operations. Nearby is Flaming Geyser, which gets its name from methane gas and a coal seam.
