= King County, Washington =

County in Washington, United States

- County
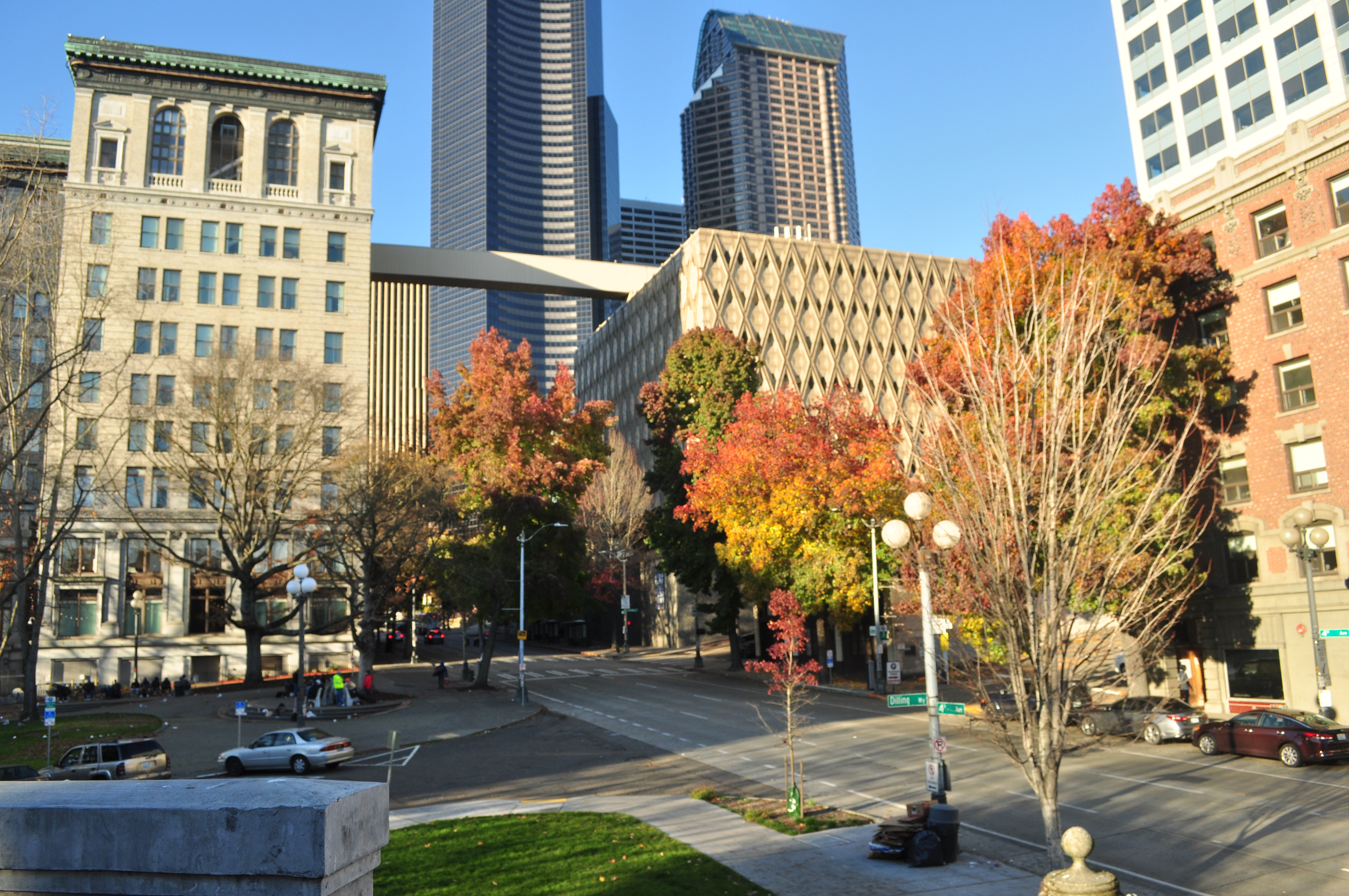
- City Hall Park and King County Courthouse in downtown Seattle

- Flag Logo

- Location within the U.S. state of Washington
- Coordinates: 47°28′N 121°50′W
- Country: United States
- State: Washington
- Founded: December 22, 1852
- Named for: William R. King (1852–2005); Martin Luther King Jr. (since 2005)
- Seat: Seattle
- Largest city: Seattle

Area
  - Total: 2,307 sq mi (5,980 km^{2})
  - Land: 2,116 sq mi (5,480 km^{2})
  - Water: 191 sq mi (490 km^{2}) 8.3%

Population (2020)
  - Total: 2,269,675
  - Estimate (2025): 2,344,939 ▲
  - Density: 1,073/sq mi (414.1/km^{2})

GDP
  - Total: $477.154 billion (2024)
  - Per capita: $203,482 (2024)
- Time zone: UTC−8 (Pacific)
  - Summer (DST): UTC−7 (PDT)
- Area code: 206, 253, 360, 425, 564
- Congressional districts: 1st, 7th, 8th, 9th
- Website: kingcounty.gov
- ASN: 2544

King County is a county located in the U.S. state of Washington. The population was 2,269,675 in the 2020 census, making it the most populous county in Washington, and the 13th-most populous in the United States. The county seat is Seattle, also the state's most populous city.

Originally named after US representative, senator, and then vice president-elect William R. King in 1852, the county government amended its designation in 1986 to honor Martin Luther King Jr., a prominent activist and leader during the civil rights movement. The change was approved by the state government in 2005.

It is one of three Washington counties that are included in the Seattle metropolitan area along with Snohomish County to the north and Pierce County to the south. About two-thirds of King County's population lives in Seattle's suburbs, which largely developed in the late 20th century and early 21st century as bedroom communities before becoming job centers for the technology industry.

== History ==
When Europeans arrived in the region that would become King County, it was inhabited by several Coast Salish groups. Villages around the site that would become Seattle were primarily populated by the Duwamish people. The Snoqualmie Indian Tribe occupied the area that would become eastern King County. The Green River and White River were home for the Muckleshoot tribal groups. In the first winter after the Denny Party landed at Alki Point, the settlement at the point consisted of a few dozen settlers and over a thousand Native Americans. The local tribes provided the settlers with construction labor, domestic service, and help with subsistence activities.

On December 22, 1852, the Oregon Territory legislature formed King County out of territory from within Thurston County. The county was named after Alabamian William R. King, who had just been elected Vice President of the United States under President Franklin Pierce. Seattle was made the county seat on January 11, 1853. The area became part of the Washington Territory when it was created later that year.

King County originally extended to the Olympic Peninsula. According to historian Bill Speidel, when peninsular prohibitionists threatened to shut down Seattle's saloons, Doc Maynard engineered a peninsular independence movement; King County lost what is now Kitsap County but preserved its entertainment industry.

Coal was discovered in 1853 by M. Bigelow along the Black River, and in subsequent decades several companies formed to mine coal around Lake Washington and deliver it to Seattle. The Seattle and Walla Walla Railroad started servicing the Renton coal fields in 1877, and the Newcastle fields in 1878. By 1880, King County produced 22% of the coal mined on the West Coast, most of that coal being found within the Renton Formation's Muldoon coal seam.

=== Name ===
King County's former flag, used from 1984 to 2007

On February 24, 1986, the King County Council approved a motion to rename the county to honor civil rights leader Martin Luther King Jr., preserving the name "King County" while changing its namesake. The motion stated, among other reasons for the change, that "William Rufus DeVane King was a slaveowner" who "earned income and maintained his lifestyle by oppressing and exploiting other human beings," while Martin Luther King's "contributions are well-documented and celebrated by millions throughout this nation and the world, and embody the attributes for which the citizens of King County can be proud, and claim as their own."

Because only the state can charter counties, the change was not made official until April 19, 2005, when Governor Christine Gregoire signed into law Senate Bill 5332, which provided that "King county is renamed in honor of the Reverend Doctor Martin Luther King, Jr." effective July 24, 2005.

The County Council voted on February 27, 2006, to adopt the proposal sponsored by Councilmember Larry Gossett to change the county's logo from an imperial crown to an image of Martin Luther King Jr. On March 12, 2007, the new logo was unveiled. The new logo design was developed by the Gable Design Group and the specific image was selected by a committee consisting of King County Executive Ron Sims, Council Chair Larry Gossett, Prosecutor Norm Maleng, Sheriff Sue Rahr, District Court Judge Corrina Harn, and Superior Court Judge Michael Trickey. The same logo is used in the flag.

Martin Luther King Jr. had visited King County once, for three days in November 1961. He had been invited by longtime friend Reverend Samuel B. McKinney for a set of lectures around the city, sponsored by the Mount Zion Baptist Church.

== Geography ==
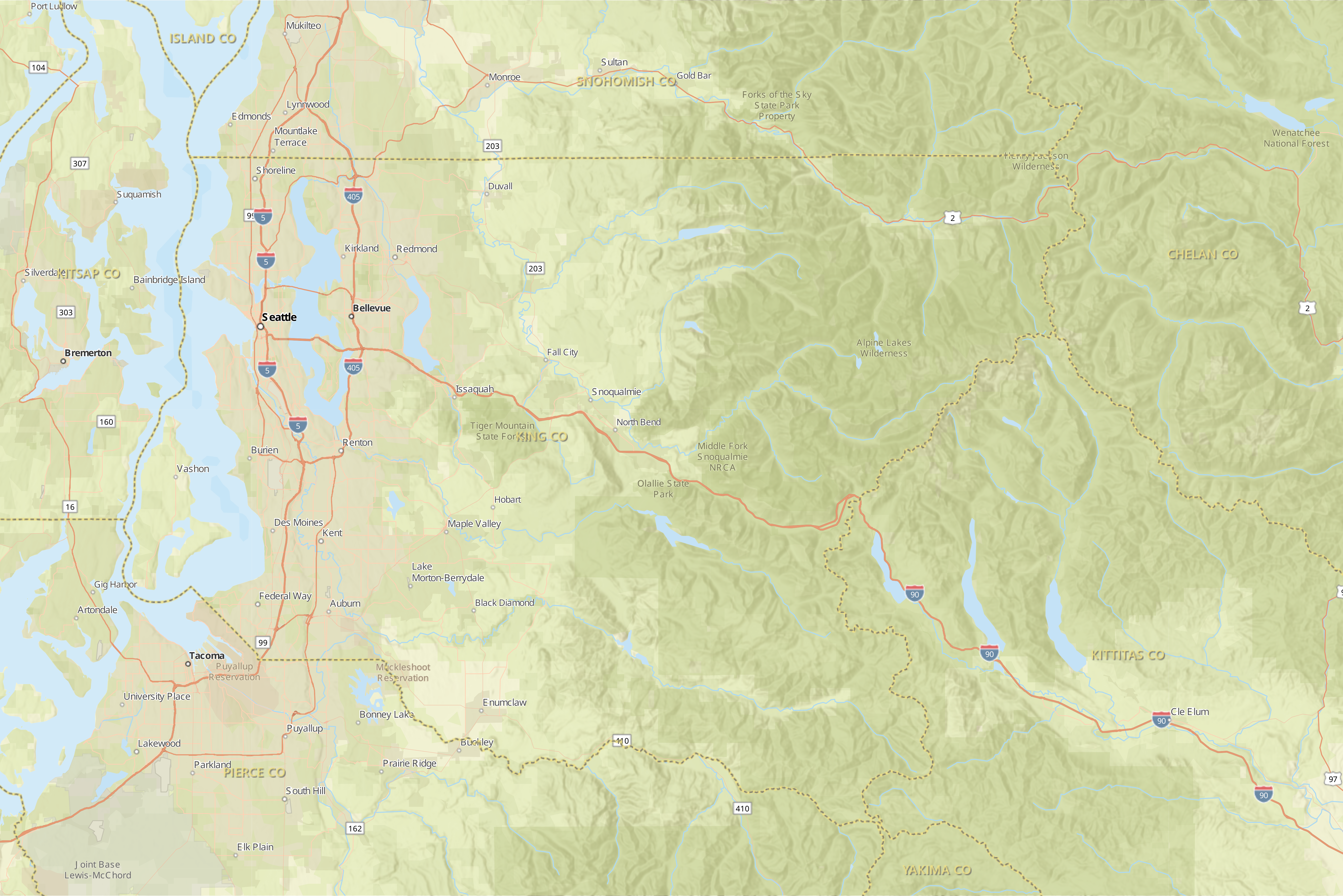
Map of the surrounding area

According to the United States Census Bureau, the county has a total area of 2,307 square miles (5,980 km^{2}), of which 2,116 square miles (5,480 km^{2}) is land and 191 square miles (490 km^{2}) (8.3%) is water. King County has nearly twice the land area of the state of Rhode Island. The highest point in the county is Mount Daniel at 7,959 feet (2,426 meters) above sea level.

King County borders Snohomish County to the north, Chelan County to the northeast, Kittitas County to the east, Pierce County to the south, and Kitsap County to the west. King County includes Vashon Island and Maury Island in Puget Sound.

The county has 760 lakes and 3,000 miles (4,800 km) of streams and rivers.

=== Geographic features ===
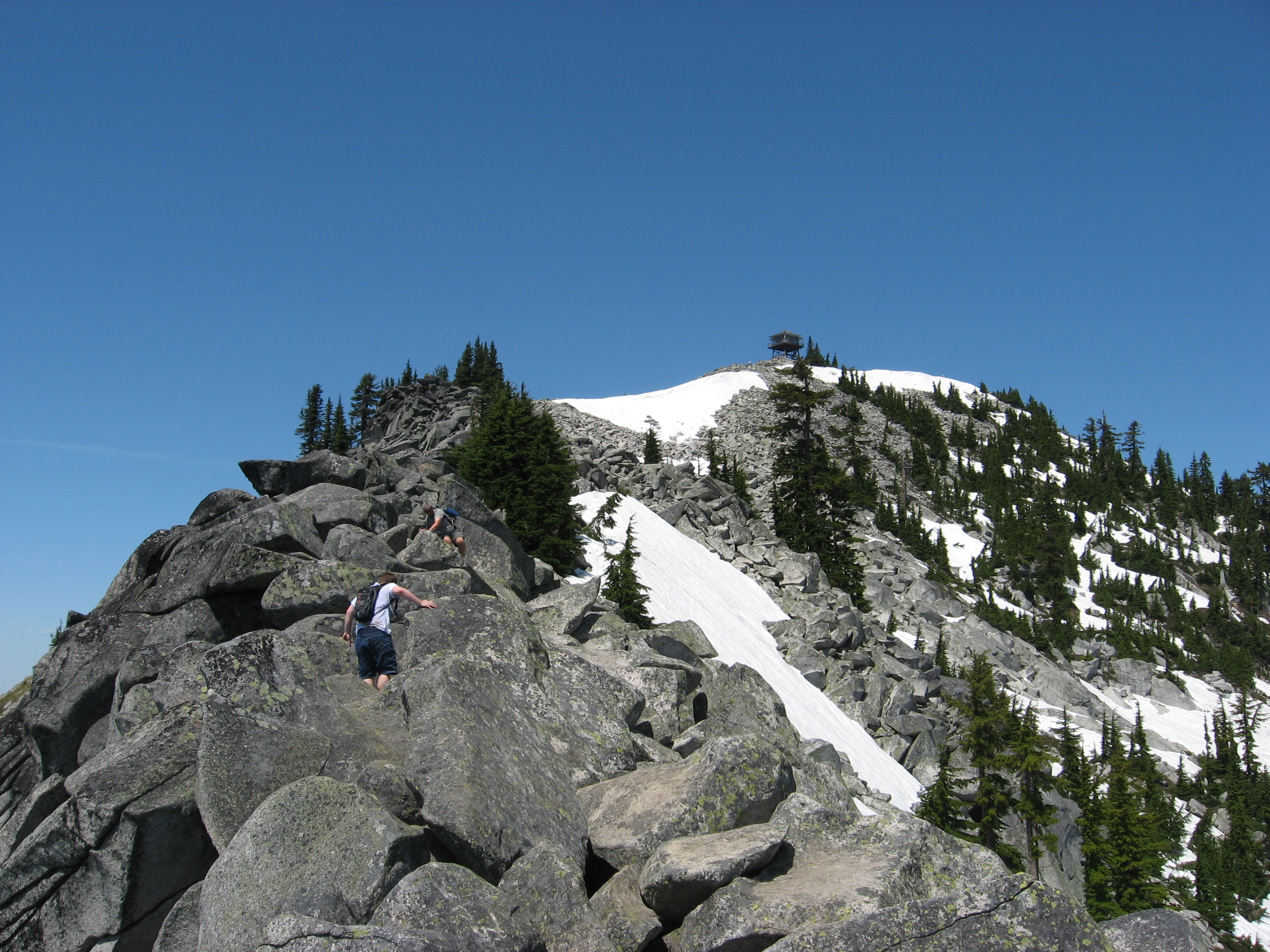
The Cascade Range (including Granite Mountain shown here) dominates the eastern part of King County.

==== Terrain ====
- Cascade Range
- Issaquah Alps
- Mount Baker-Snoqualmie National Forest
- Mount Daniel, the highest point
- Mount Si
- Harbor Island
- Maury Island
- Mercer Island
- Sammamish Plateau
- Vashon Island

==== Water ====
- Cedar River
- Green/Duwamish River
- Elliott Bay
- Greenwater River
- Issaquah Creek
- Lake Sammamish
- Lake Union
- Lake Washington
- Lake Youngs
- Pratt River
- Puget Sound
- Raging River
- Skykomish River
- Snoqualmie Falls
- Snoqualmie River
- Taylor River
- Tolt River
- White River

=== National protected areas ===
- Klondike Gold Rush National Historical Park (part, also in Skagway, Alaska)
- Snoqualmie National Forest (part)

=== Climate change ===
King County has been identified as vulnerable to higher risks of flooding caused by climate change due to the number of waterways in the area. The county's oceanic ecosystems are predicted to face harmful chemical changes, while the mountainous ecosystems could experience a decrease in ice and snow. Since the mid-2000s, the county government has adopted policies to mitigate the effects of climate change and reduce carbon dioxide emissions in the region.

== Transportation ==
=== Major highways ===
- Interstate 5
- Interstate 90
- Interstate 405
- U.S. Route 2
- State Route 18
- State Route 99
- State Route 167
- State Route 520
- State Route 522

U.S. Route 2 (the Cascade Highway) only traverses the very northeastern part of the county, along the Skykomish River. This area has no direct road access to the rest of the county.

=== Public transit ===
The King County Metro serves the county with local routes, paratransit, vanpools, and rideshare in select areas. It also operates an electric trolleybus network in Seattle as well as the city streetcar system. Metro was the seventh-largest transit bus agency in the United States by ridership in 2019, with 121.3 million annual passenger trips and 400,000 per weekday. Sound Transit manages Link light rail, Sounder commuter rail, and Sound Transit Express buses in King County that provide connections to adjacent counties. The Community Transit of Snohomish County and the Pierce Transit of Pierce County also operate routes that serve portions of King County. Most transit modes in the county use the ORCA card, a smart fare card system introduced in 2009.

The county is home to three major ferry terminals that are served by Washington State Ferries, a state-run passenger and automobile ferry system. Colman Dock in Downtown Seattle is served by routes from Bainbridge Island and Bremerton; Vashon Island is connected to West Seattle at Fauntleroy and also has service to Southworth in Kitsap County. The county government's Marine Division operates the King County Water Taxi, a passenger ferry service that connects Downtown Seattle to West Seattle and Vashon Island. The passenger-only Kitsap Fast Ferries system operated by Kitsap Transit connects a terminal near Colman Dock to communities on the Kitsap Peninsula.

== Demographics ==
Historical population
Census	Pop.	Note	%±
1860	302		—
1870	2,120		602.0%
1880	6,910		225.9%
1890	63,989		826.0%
1900	110,053		72.0%
1910	284,638		158.6%
1920	389,273		36.8%
1930	463,517		19.1%
1940	504,980		8.9%
1950	732,992		45.2%
1960	935,014		27.6%
1970	1,156,633		23.7%
1980	1,269,749		9.8%
1990	1,507,319		18.7%
2000	1,737,034		15.2%
2010	1,931,249		11.2%
2020	2,269,675		17.5%
2025 (est.)	2,344,939	▲	3.3%
U.S. Decennial Census; 1790–1960 1900–1990; 1990–2000 2010–2020

The center of population of the state of Washington in 2010 was located in eastern King County (47.330750°N 121.619994°W). King County's own center of population was located on Mercer Island (47.548320°N 122.229983°W).

As of the fourth quarter of 2021, the median home value in King County was $817,547, an increase of 19.6% from the prior year.

In 2021 King County experienced its first population decline in 50 years.

=== Racial and ethnic composition since 1960 ===
Racial composition	2020	2010	2000	1990	1980	1970	1960
White (non-Hispanic)	54.2%	64.8%	73.4%	83.2%	87.2%	–	–
Asian (non-Hispanic)	19.8%	14.5%	10.8%	7.8%	–	–	2.0%
Hispanic or Latino	10.7%	8.9%	5.4%	2.9%	2.1%	1.8%	–
Black or African American (non-Hispanic)	6.5%	6.0%	5.4%	5.0%	4.4%	3.5%	2.9%
Pacific Islander (non-Hispanic)	0.9%	0.7%	0.5%	–	–	–	–
Native American (non-Hispanic)	0.5%	0.7%	0.9%	1.1%	–	–	0.3%
Mixed (non-Hispanic)	6.8%	4.1%	4.0%	–	–	–	–

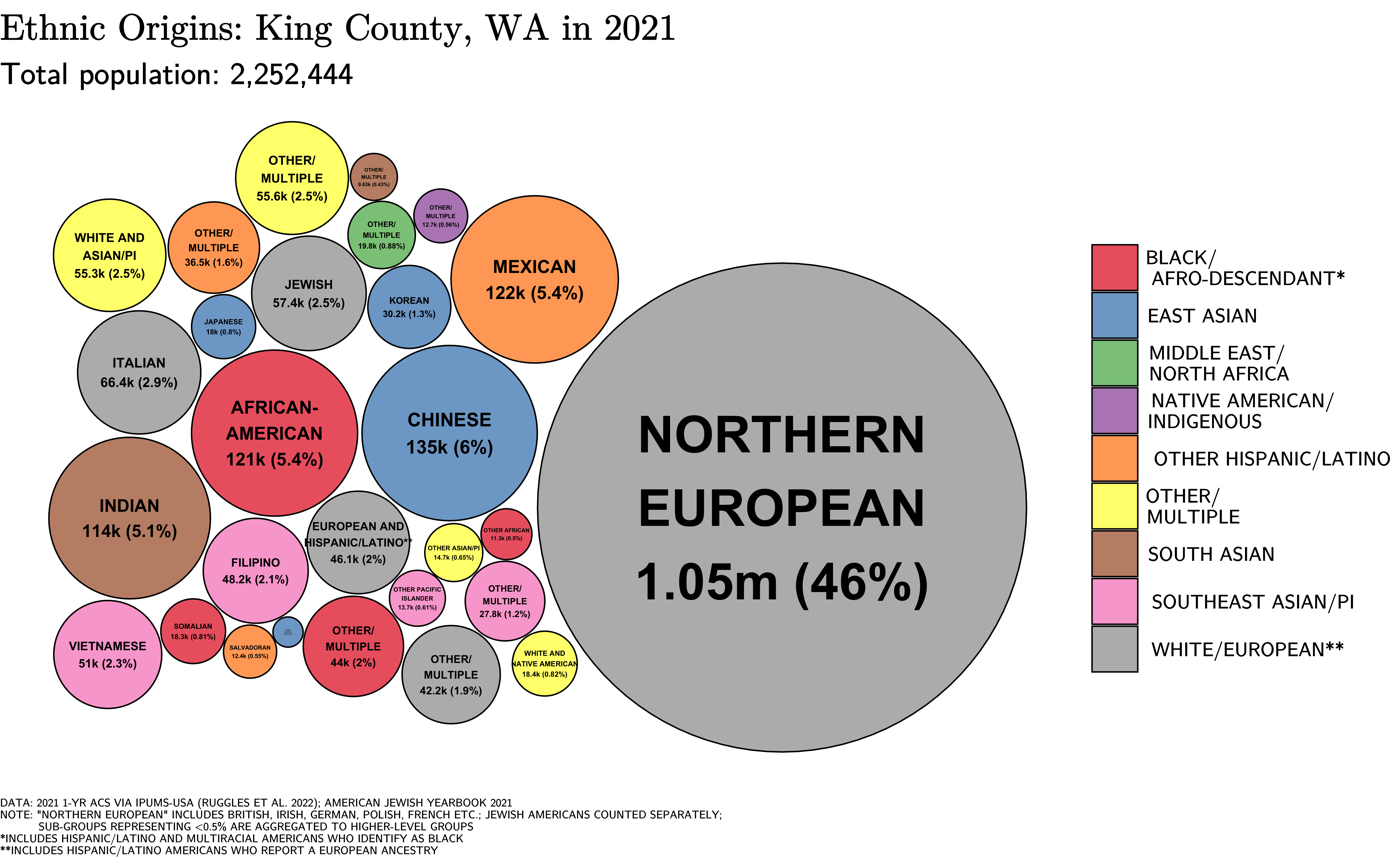
Ethnic origins in King County

=== 2020 census ===
As of the 2020 census, there were 2,269,675 people, 917,764 households, and 537,466 families residing in the county. Of the residents, 20.1% were under the age of 18 and 13.5% were 65 years of age or older; the median age was 36.9 years. For every 100 females there were 100.3 males, and for every 100 females age 18 and over there were 99.1 males. 96.7% of residents lived in urban areas and 3.3% lived in rural areas.

King County, Washington – Racial and ethnic composition Note: the US Census treats Hispanic/Latino as an ethnic category. This table excludes Latinos from the racial categories and assigns them to a separate category. Hispanics/Latinos may be of any race.
Race / Ethnicity (NH = Non-Hispanic)	Pop 2000	Pop 2010	Pop 2020	% 2000	% 2010	% 2020
White alone (NH)	1,275,127	1,251,300	1,230,588	73.41%	64.79%	54.22%
Black or African American alone (NH)	91,798	116,326	147,831	5.28%	6.02%	6.51%
Native American or Alaska Native alone (NH)	14,278	12,931	11,810	0.82%	0.67%	0.52%
Asian alone (NH)	186,615	280,029	449,729	10.74%	14.50%	19.81%
Pacific Islander alone (NH)	8,737	14,068	19,399	0.50%	0.73%	0.85%
Other race alone (NH)	4,577	4,688	13,538	0.26%	0.24%	0.60%
Mixed race or Multiracial (NH)	60,660	79,529	153,759	3.49%	4.12%	6.77%
Hispanic or Latino (any race)	95,242	172,378	243,021	5.48%	8.93%	10.71%
Total	1,737,034	1,931,249	2,269,675	100.00%	100.00%	100.00%

There were 917,764 households in the county, of which 27.7% had children under the age of 18 living with them and 24.9% had a female householder with no spouse or partner present. About 30.3% of all households were made up of individuals and 8.8% had someone living alone who was 65 years of age or older.

The population density was 1,073.0 inhabitants per square mile (414.3/km^{2}). There were 969,234 housing units, of which 5.3% were vacant. Among occupied housing units, 54.0% were owner-occupied and 46.0% were renter-occupied. The homeowner vacancy rate was 0.9% and the rental vacancy rate was 5.1%.

The racial makeup of the county was 56.1% White, 6.7% Black or African American, 0.8% American Indian and Alaska Native, 19.9% Asian, 5.2% from some other race, and 10.4% from two or more races. Hispanic or Latino residents of any race comprised 10.7% of the population.

=== 2010 census ===
As of the 2010 census, there were 1,931,249 people, 789,232 households, and 461,510 families residing in the county. The population density was 912.9 inhabitants per square mile (352.5/km^{2}). There were 851,261 housing units at an average density of 402.4 per square mile (155.4/km^{2}). The racial makeup of the county was 68.7% White (64.8% Non-Hispanic White), 6.2% African American, 14.6% Asian, 0.8% Pacific Islander, 0.8% Native American, 3.9% from other races, and 5.0% from two or more races. Those of Hispanic or Latino origin made up 8.9% of the population. In terms of ancestry, 17.1% were German, 11.6% were English, 11.1% were Irish, 5.5% were Norwegian, and 2.9% were American.

Of the 789,232 households, 29.2% had children under the age of 18 living with them, 45.3% were married couples living together, 9.1% had a female householder with no husband present, 41.5% were non-families, and 31.0% of all households were made up of individuals. The average household size was 2.40 and the average family size was 3.05. The median age was 37.1 years.

The median income for a household in the county was $68,065 and the median income for a family was $87,010. Males had a median income of $62,373 versus $45,761 for females. The per capita income for the county was $38,211. About 6.4% of families and 10.2% of the population were below the poverty line, including 12.5% of those under age 18 and 8.6% of those age 65 or over.

=== Native American tribes ===
King County is home to two federally-recognized tribes, the Muckleshoot tribe and the Snoqualmie Indian Tribe tribe, and other unrecognized groups. The Muckleshoot Indian Reservation is located southeast of Auburn and is home to a resident population of 3,606 as of the 2000 census.

The Snoqualmie tribe's casino property was federally recognized as their reservation in 2006, however few tribe members live near the reservation.

=== Religion ===
According to statistics from 2010, the largest religious group in King County was the Roman Catholic Archdiocese of Seattle, with 278,340 members worshipping at 71 parishes, followed by 95,218 non-denominational Christian adherents with 159 congregations, 56,985 LDS Mormons with 110 congregations, 25,937 AoG Pentecostals with 63 congregations, 25,789 ELCA Lutherans with 68 congregations, 24,909 PC-USA Presbyterians with 54 congregations, 18,185 Mahayana Buddhists with 39 congregations, 18,161 UMC Methodists with 50 congregations, 14,971 TEC Episcopalians with 35 congregations, and 12,531 ABCUSA Baptists with 42 congregations. Altogether, 37.6% of the population was claimed as members by religious congregations, although members of historically African-American denominations were underrepresented due to incomplete information. In 2014, King County had 944 religious organizations, the eighth most of all U.S. counties.

=== Homelessness ===
King County has the third largest population of homeless or unsheltered people in the United States according to the U.S. Department of Housing and Urban Development (HUD). The agency's January 2023 report, based on the point-in-time count system, estimates 14,149 people in the county have experienced homelessness; the King County Regional Homelessness Authority (KCRHA) adopted a different methodology based on the number of people seeking services and estimated that 53,532 people in the county had been homeless at some point in 2022. According to a survey collected by service providers for the county government, 68.5 percent of respondents said they last had stable housing in King County and 10.8 percent had lived elsewhere in the state. Approximately 57 percent of the homeless population counted by HUD in King County was classified as unsheltered, either living in vehicles, encampments in public spaces, or other places. The number of unsheltered individuals increased significantly in the late 2010s, leading to clearing of encampments and other structures by local governments.

The county has 5,115 emergency shelter beds and tiny house villages, of which 67 percent are in the city of Seattle. According to data from the KCRHA, since late 2022 over 90 percent of shelter beds have been occupied on a consistent basis. Additional shelters, parking lots, and encampment sites are operated by charity organizations and churches in the area; during severe weather events such as heat waves and cold snaps, local governments open additional shelter spaces, but these often reach capacity. In 2021, a total of $123 million was spent on homelessness services by local governments in King County, including cities and the regional authority. The regional authority's five-year plan, released in 2023, estimates that $8 billion in capital costs would be required to build and staff 18,205 new units of temporary and transitional housing to address the homelessness crisis.

== Economy ==
King County is the state leader in total employment, with Seattle as the major contributor; healthcare is the principal private (non-government) employment sector, with many company headquarters in the area.

As of May 2025, King County had an unemployment rate of 4.1% without adjustments for seasonal labor.

Boeing has a significant manufacturing presence in the surrounding area. The 2024 Boeing machinists' strike had a major impact on county employment statistics.

In 2023, the average salary in King County was $120,463 (compared to $87,054 in all of Washington); the number of workers in the largest employment sectors of 2023 were:

- 173,135 in government
- 160,135 in healthcare and social assistance
- 154,638 in professional, scientific, and technical services
- 134,548 in information
- 107,610 in accommodation and food services

== Government ==
The King County Executive heads the county's executive branch; the position has been held by Girmay Zahilay since 2025. The King County Prosecuting Attorney (Leesa Manion since 2023), Elections Director, and the King County Assessor are elected executive positions. The King County Sheriff is appointed by the county executive and approved by the county council. It was previously an elected position from 1996 until 2020 and has been held by Patti Cole-Tindall since 2022. Judicial power is vested in the King County Superior Court and the King County District Court. Seattle houses the King County Courthouse.

The county government manages elections, records, licensing, parks, wastewater treatment, and public health, among other duties. It also handles the criminal legal and incarceration system for all cities and unincorporated areas within King County. It has a sheriff's department that also provides basic policing to unincorporated areas. The Department of Local Services, established in 2019, serves as the local government for populated unincorporated areas.

King County is part of four congressional districts that each elect a member of the United States House of Representatives; the boundaries are redrawn every 10 years based on the results of the decennial census. The 1st district comprises the Eastside cities north of Bellevue; the 7th district includes northern Seattle, West Seattle, Burien, Normandy Park, and Vashon Island; the 8th district includes areas east of Lake Sammamish and the immediate Green River Valley; and the 9th district comprises the southern areas of the county from Federal Way to Seattle, Mercer Island, and part of Bellevue. In the state legislature, the county has 17 districts that each elect two House members and one senator. The majority of state legislators from King County are Democrats; only four House members and two senators are from the Republican Party.

The people of King County voted on September 5, 1911, to create a Port District. King County's Port of Seattle was established as the first Port District in Washington State. The Port of Seattle is King County's only Port District. It is governed by five Port Commissioners, who are elected countywide and serve four-year terms. The Port of Seattle owns and operates many properties on behalf of King County's citizens, including Sea-Tac International Airport; many seaport facilities around Elliott Bay, including its original property, publicly owned Fishermen's Terminal, home to the North Pacific fishing fleet and the largest homeport for fishermen in the U.S. West Coast; four container ship terminals; two cruise ship terminals; the largest grain export terminal in the U.S. Pacific Northwest; three public marinas; 22 public parks; and nearly 5,000 acres of industrial lands in the Ballard-Interbay and Lower Duwamish industrial centers.

Regional Animal Services of King County (RASKC), an agency of the county government, operates its animal shelter in Kent. The agency was previously called King County Animal Control. It was established in 1972 and renovated a dairy barn into an animal shelter in 1974. The agency started using its current name in 2008. In 2025 the county purchased a building in Kent which would be the replacement shelter, scheduled to open in 2027.

=== County council ===
The King County Council was established in 1969 and consists of nine members elected by districts to four-year terms.

- District 1 – Rod Dembowski
- District 2 – Girmay Zahilay
- District 3 – Sarah Perry
- District 4 – Jorge Barón
- District 5 – Steffanie Fain
- District 6 – Claudia Balducci
- District 7 – Pete von Reichbauer
- District 8 – Teresa Mosqueda
- District 9 – Reagan Dunn

== Politics ==
King County and Seattle are strongly liberal; the area is a bastion for the Democratic Party. No Republican presidential candidate has carried the county votes since Ronald Reagan's landslide reelection victory in 1984. In the 2008 election, Barack Obama defeated John McCain in the county by 42 percentage points, a larger margin for the Democrats than that seen in any previous election up to that point in time. Slightly more than 29% of Washington state's population reside in King County, making it a significant factor for the Democrats in a few recent close statewide elections. In the 2000 Senate election, King County's margin of victory pushed Maria Cantwell's total over that of incumbent Republican Slade Gorton, defeating and unseating him in the United States Senate. In 2004, King County gave a lead to Democrat Christine Gregoire in her 2004 victory gubernatorial election, pushing her ahead of Republican Dino Rossi, who led by 261 votes after the initial count. Rossi resided in the county at the time of the election, in Sammamish. In the 2020 presidential election, Joe Biden defeated Donald Trump by earning 75% of King County votes. Governor Jay Inslee also defeated Republican challenger Loren Culp with 74% of the King County vote in the concurrent gubernatorial election. These were the largest margins by any candidate in a presidential race and a gubernatorial race since the county's creation.

In 2004, voters passed a referendum reducing the size of the County Council from 13 members to 9. This resulted in all council seats ending up on the 2005 ballot.

Some residents of eastern King County have long desired to secede and form their own county. This movement was most vocal in the mid-1990s (see Cedar County, Washington). It has recently been revived as Cascade County. According to a map published by the Seattle Times, four different geographic borders were considered. Additional plans (see Skykomish County, Washington) also exist or have existed.

United States presidential election results for King County, Washington
Year	Republican		Democratic		Third party(ies)	
Year	No.	%	No.	%	No.	%
1892	6,520	44.17%	4,974	33.69%	3,268	22.14%
1896	6,413	44.83%	7,733	54.06%	159	1.11%
1900	10,218	54.26%	7,804	41.44%	810	4.30%
1904	20,434	70.39%	5,266	18.14%	3,329	11.47%
1908	22,297	55.75%	14,644	36.62%	3,052	7.63%
1912	15,579	21.85%	20,088	28.17%	35,642	49.98%
1916	38,959	40.71%	52,362	54.71%	4,387	4.58%
1920	58,584	54.69%	17,369	16.21%	31,171	29.10%
1924	60,438	53.51%	7,404	6.56%	45,098	39.93%
1928	96,263	65.63%	46,604	31.77%	3,811	2.60%
1932	63,346	34.42%	108,738	59.09%	11,947	6.49%
1936	66,544	31.68%	138,597	65.98%	4,904	2.33%
1940	95,504	39.50%	143,134	59.19%	3,165	1.31%
1944	118,719	41.42%	165,308	57.68%	2,577	0.90%
1948	131,039	44.93%	143,295	49.14%	17,301	5.93%
1952	200,507	53.93%	165,583	44.54%	5,681	1.53%
1956	213,504	55.28%	167,443	43.35%	5,276	1.37%
1960	224,150	50.85%	208,756	47.36%	7,904	1.79%
1964	177,598	39.41%	268,216	59.52%	4,826	1.07%
1968	218,457	46.00%	223,469	47.05%	33,009	6.95%
1972	298,707	56.39%	212,509	40.12%	18,478	3.49%
1976	279,382	50.79%	248,743	45.22%	21,994	4.00%
1980	272,567	45.42%	235,046	39.16%	92,544	15.42%
1984	332,987	52.09%	298,620	46.71%	7,654	1.20%
1988	290,574	44.78%	349,663	53.88%	8,720	1.34%
1992	212,986	27.36%	391,050	50.23%	174,557	22.42%
1996	232,811	31.41%	417,846	56.38%	90,447	12.20%
2000	273,171	34.40%	476,700	60.02%	44,325	5.58%
2004	301,043	33.69%	580,378	64.95%	12,113	1.36%
2008	259,716	28.17%	648,230	70.30%	14,086	1.53%
2012	275,700	28.51%	668,004	69.07%	23,450	2.42%
2016	216,339	21.04%	718,322	69.85%	93,789	9.12%
2020	269,167	22.24%	907,310	74.95%	34,030	2.81%
2024	252,193	22.31%	832,606	73.65%	45,703	4.04%

== Education ==
=== K–12 schools ===
School districts in the county include:

- Auburn School District
- Bellevue School District
- Enumclaw School District
- Federal Way Public Schools
- Fife Public Schools
- Highline School District
- Issaquah School District
- Kent School District
- Lake Washington School District
- Mercer Island School District
- Northshore School District
- Renton School District
- Riverview School District
- Seattle Public Schools
- Shoreline School District
- Skykomish School District
- Snoqualmie Valley School District
- Tahoma School District
- Tukwila School District
- Vashon Island School District

=== Public libraries ===
Most of King County is served by the King County Library System, with the exception of Seattle, Hunts Point, and Yarrow Point. The city of Seattle is served by the Seattle Public Library system, which has 27 branches compared to King County's 49 locations.

== Communities ==
=== Cities ===
- Algona
- Auburn (partial)
- Bellevue
- Black Diamond
- Bothell (partial)
- Burien
- Carnation
- Clyde Hill
- Covington
- Des Moines
- Duvall
- Enumclaw
- Federal Way
- Issaquah
- Kenmore
- Kent
- Kirkland
- Lake Forest Park
- Maple Valley
- Medina
- Mercer Island
- Milton (partial)
- Newcastle
- Normandy Park
- North Bend
- Pacific (partial)
- Redmond
- Renton
- Sammamish
- SeaTac
- Seattle (county seat)
- Shoreline
- Snoqualmie
- Tukwila
- Woodinville

=== Towns ===
- Beaux Arts Village
- Hunts Point
- Skykomish
- Yarrow Point

=== Census-designated places ===
- Ames Lake
- Baring
- Boulevard Park
- Bryn Mawr-Skyway
- Cottage Lake
- East Renton Highlands
- Fairwood
- Fall City
- Hobart
- Inglewood-Finn Hill (former)
- Klahanie (former)
- Lake Holm
- Lake Marcel-Stillwater
- Lake Morton-Berrydale
- Lakeland North
- Lakeland South
- Maple Heights-Lake Desire
- Mirrormont
- Ravensdale
- Riverbend
- Riverpoint
- Riverton (former)
- Shadow Lake
- Union Hill-Novelty Hill
- Vashon
- White Center
- Wilderness Rim

=== Other unincorporated communities ===
- Cedar Falls
- Berrydale
- Cedarhurst
- Cumberland
- Denny Creek
- Ernie's Grove
- Grotto
- Kanaskat
- Kangley
- Lake Joy
- Naco
- Novelty
- Palmer
- Preston
- Selleck
- Spring Glen
- Wabash

=== Former cities and towns ===
- East Redmond
- Foster
- Houghton

=== Ghost towns ===
- Bayne
- Cedar Falls (aka Moncton)
- Edgewick
- Franklin
- Hot Springs
- Krain
- Lester
- Monohon
- Nagrom
- O'Brien
- Osceola
- Taylor
- Wellington
- Weston

== See also ==
- List of memorials to Martin Luther King Jr.
- National Register of Historic Places listings in King County, Washington
- Tukwila Formation
