= List of ghost towns in Washington =

This is an incomplete list of ghost towns in Washington, a state of the United States.

== Classification ==
=== Barren site ===
- Sites no longer in existence
- Sites that have been destroyed
- Submerged in water
- Reverted to pasture
- May have a few difficult to find foundations/footings at most

=== Neglected site ===
- Only rubble left
- All buildings uninhabited
- Roofless building ruins
- Some buildings or houses still standing, but majority are roofless

=== Abandoned site ===
- Building or houses still standing
- Buildings and houses all abandoned
- No population, except caretaker
- Site no longer in existence except for one or two buildings, for example old church, grocery store

=== Semi-abandoned site ===
- Building or houses still standing
- Buildings and houses largely abandoned
- few residents
- many abandoned buildings
- Small population

=== Historic community ===
- Building or houses still standing
- Still a busy community
- Smaller than its boom years
- Population has decreased dramatically, to one fifth or less.
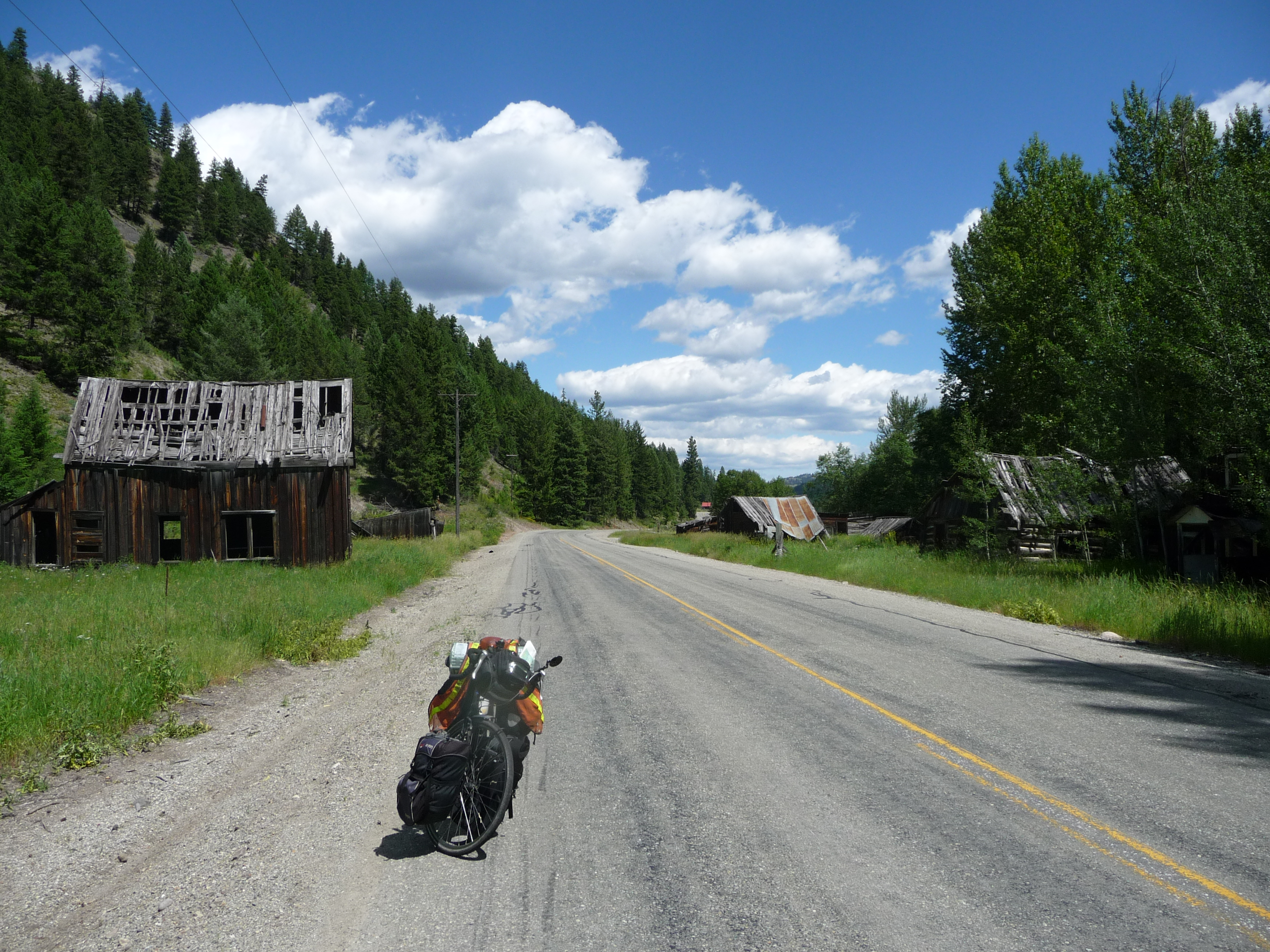
Rotting buildings in Bodie

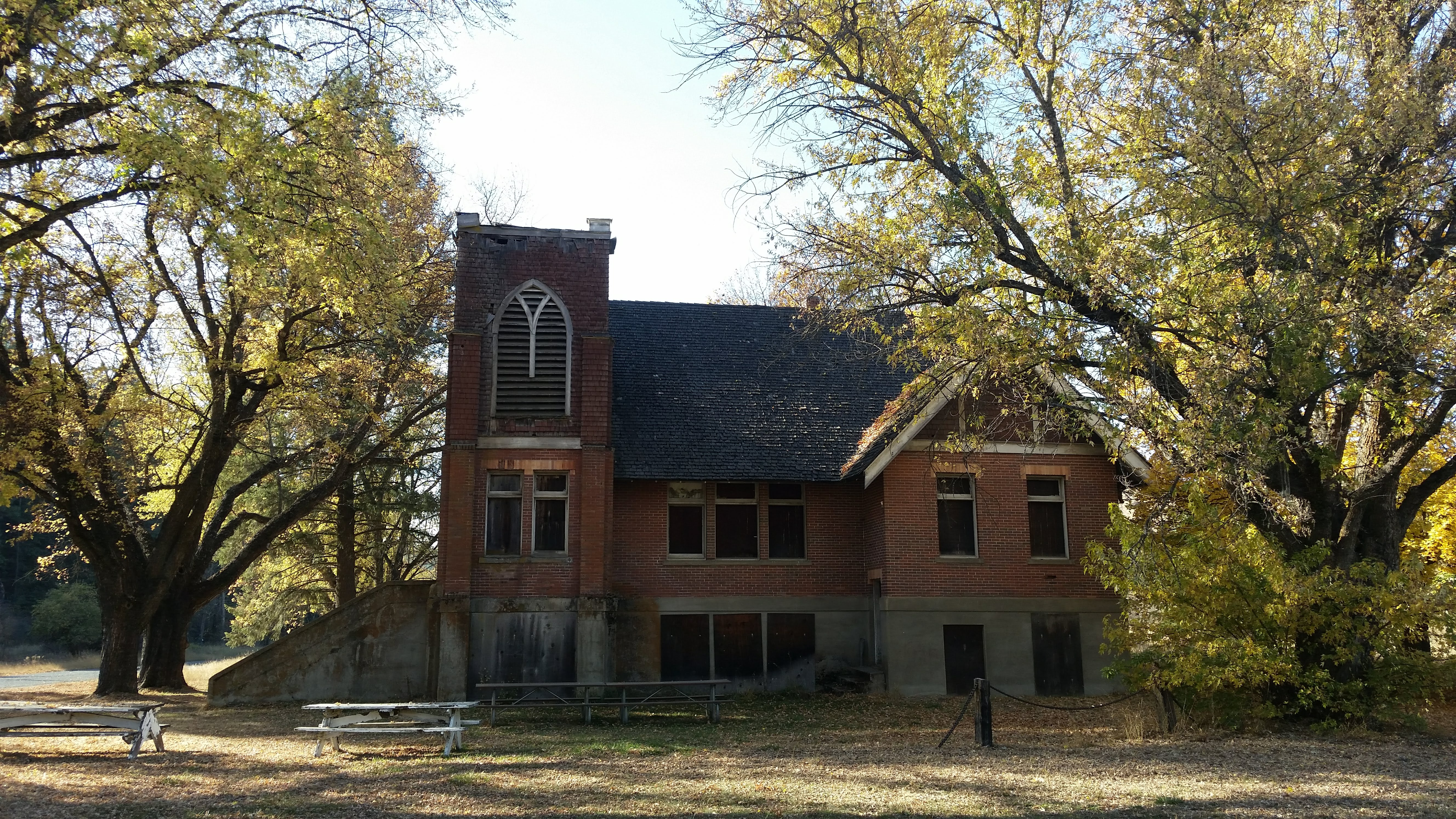
United Brethren Church, one of the few standing structures left in Elberton

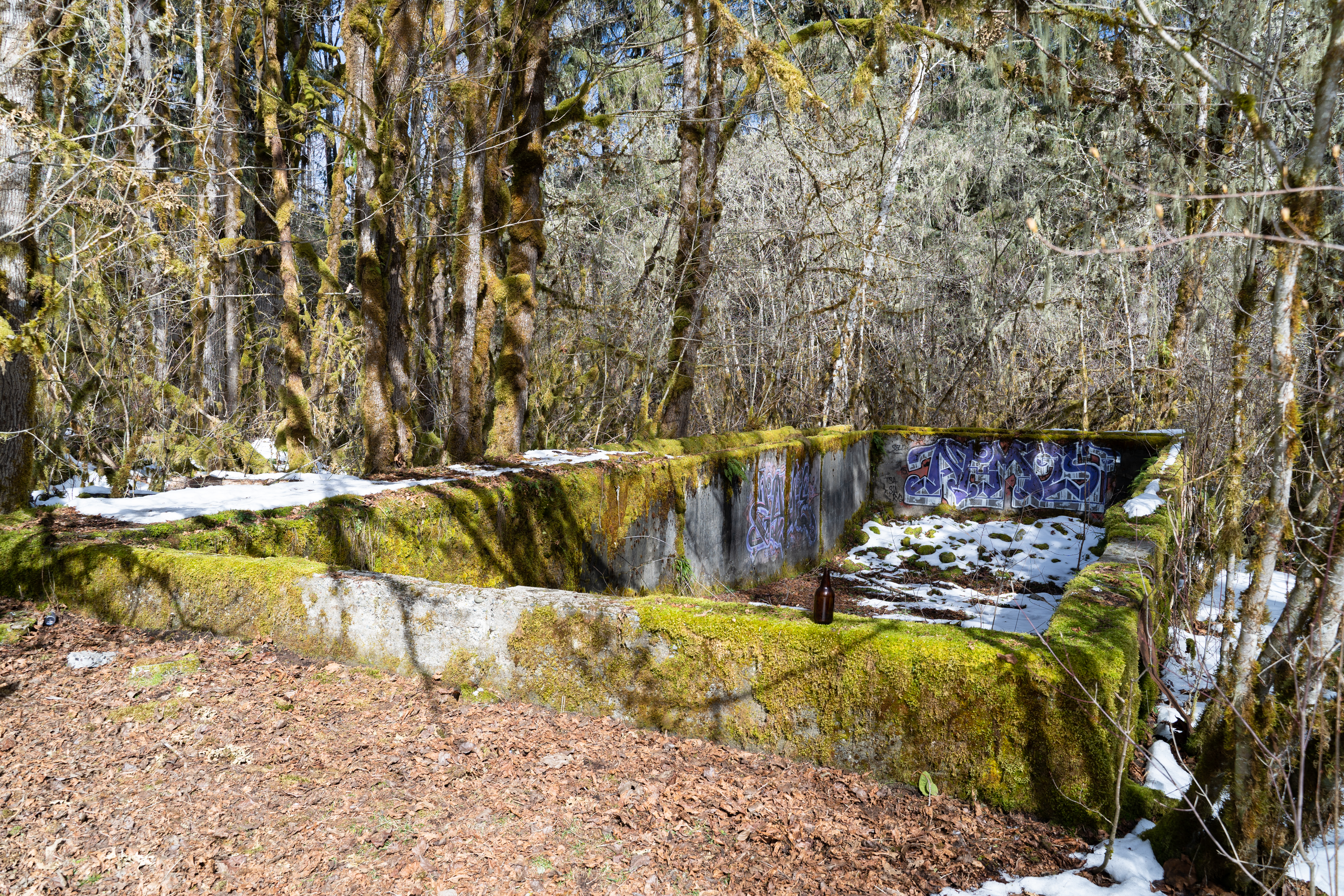
The school swimming pool is the most distinctive element left at Fairfax

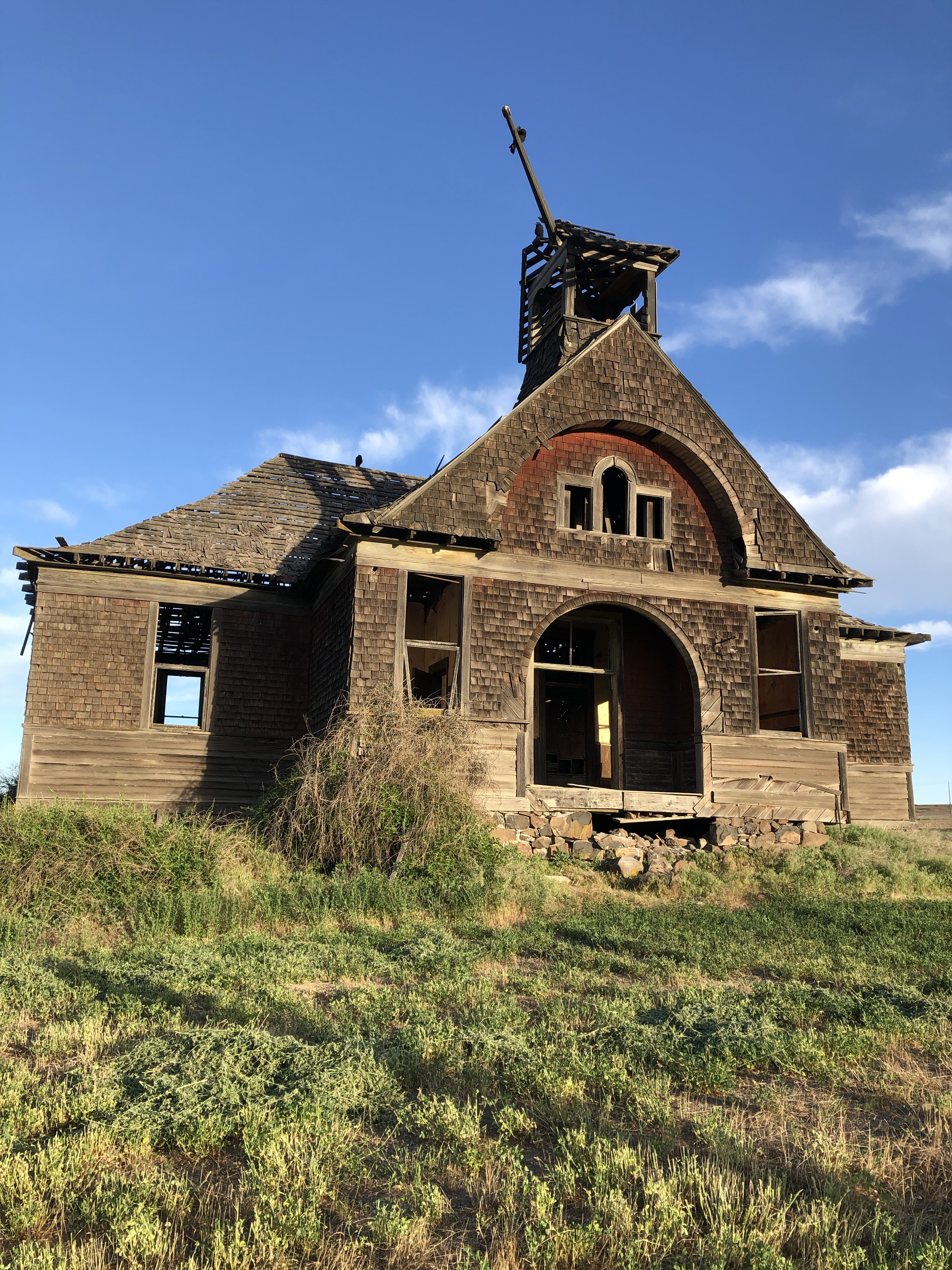
Abandoned schoolhouse in Govan

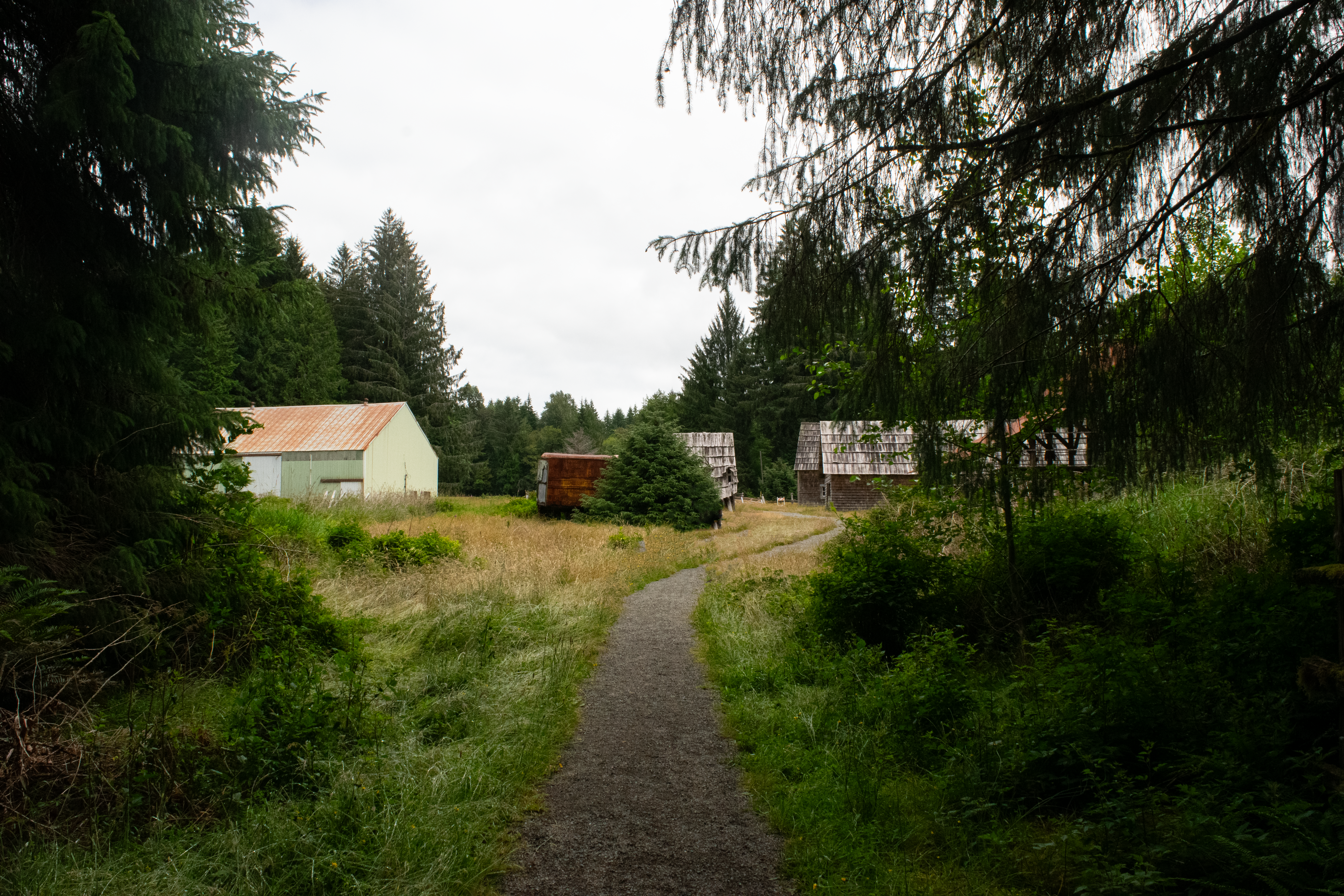
Kestner Homestead in Olympic National Park

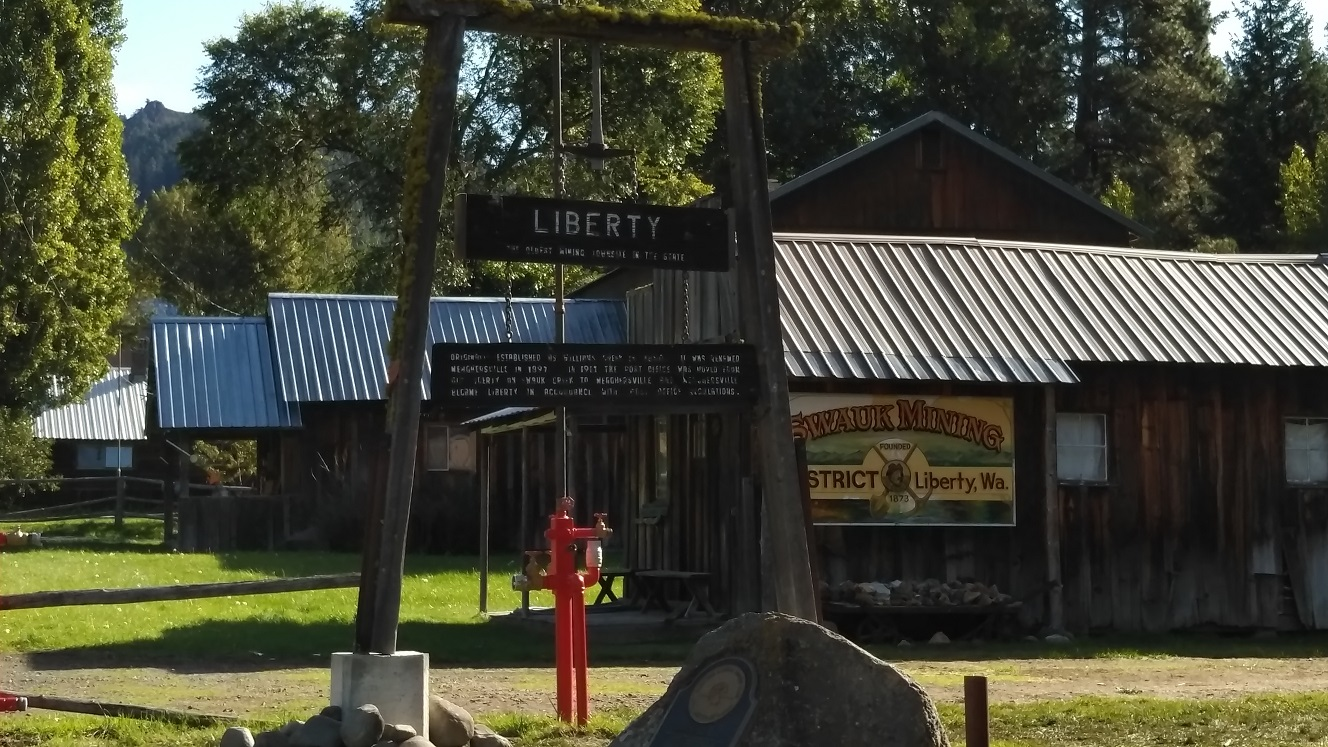
Buildings preserved at Liberty

== List of towns ==
Name	County	Location	Settled	Abandoned	Current status	Remarks
Ainsworth	Franklin	The northern bank of the mouth of the Snake River, in what is now Pasco, Washington.	October, 1879 (platted)	Approximately 1885	Absorbed into Pasco	
Alderdale	Klickitat	Along Washington State Route 14, where Alder creek connects into Columbia River	1907 (post office established)	1962 (post office closed)	Barren	It is believed that Lewis & Clark camped at nearby Alder Creek in 1806.
Almota	Whitman	Where Almonta Creek connects into Snake River	1878 (post office established)	1961 (post office closed)	Submerged	Remains of Almota were flooded by construction of the Little Goose Dam.
Alpine	Skagit	Shore of Lake Cavanaugh, Skagit County	1894	1898	Abandoned	Established as a resort, the village had homes, a schoolhouse, a post office, and a nascent hotel. By 1906 it was described as deserted.
Alpine	King	Cascade Mountains near Skykomish	late 19th century	c. 1929	Destroyed	
Alto	Columbia	Eleven or twelve miles north-east of Dayton.	1882 (post office established)	1903 (post office closed)		
Amelia	Mason		1895 (post office established)	1901 (post office closed)		
Ankeny	Adams					
Attalia	Walla Walla		1906 (post office established)	1952 (post office closed)		
Baird	Douglas		1896 (post office established)	1934 (post office closed)		
Barneston	King		1901	1924		Abandoned in 1924 after the City of Seattle disallowed all human habitation within the Cedar River watershed in order to keep the water pure.
Barron	Whatcom	Near modern Winthrop	1893	1907		
Belcher Camp	Ferry		c. 1897			
Bishop	Whitman		1913 (post office established)	1925 (post office closed)		
Blewett	Chelan		c. 1874	After 1905	Neglected	
Bodie	Okanogan		1886	1934	Neglected	
Bolster	Okanogan		1899	After 1916		
Bonita	Douglas		1903	1927		
Bordeaux	Thurston		1890s	1941	Barren	Logging town that had a post office by 1909. Town site purchased by Courtney Love in the 2000s; some concrete foundations and a smokestack remain.
Bossburg	Stevens		c. 1892	c. 1910	Semi-abandoned	
Brief						
Burnt Ridge	Lewis	Approximately 4 miles (6.4 km) east of Onalaska	1880s	Unknown (schoolhouse shuttered in 1945)	Locale, landform	Location of the Burnt Ridge Airstrip (WN74)
Camp 1	Pierce					
Canyon	Whitman		1905 (post office established)	1918 (post office closed)		
Cedarville	Stevens		1890s	1911		
Clay City	Pierce		Before 1913			
Coey	Spokane					
Craige	Asotin		1898 (post office established)	1941 (post office closed)		
Diamond City	Pend Oreille					
Darknell	Spokane					
Delaney	Columbia					
Drumheller	Franklin		1906 (post office established)	1909 (post office closed)		
Duncan	Spokane					
Ehrlich	Skagit		1896	1915		
Elberton	Whitman		1886 (platted)	1966 (disincorporated)	Semi-abandoned	
Ewartsville	Whitman					
Fairbanks	Whitman					
Fairfax	Pierce		1892	1943 (post office closed)	Barren	
Fishtrap	Lincoln		1906 (post office established)	1936 (post office closed)		
Frankfort	Pacific		1876 (Homesteaded)	After 1960		
Franklin	King		1880s	After 1919		
Freedom	Spokane				Barren	Nearby the town of Spangle.
Galena	Snohomish	Northeast of Index	Platted in 1891			
Gettysburg	Clallam		1887 (settled)	1926 (post office closed)	Barren	
Gilmer	Klickitat		1883 (post office established)	1919 (post office closed)		
Godfrey	Stevens		1905 (post office established)	1912 (post office closed)		
Golden	Okanogan		1887	After 1910		
Goshen	Whatcom					
Govan	Lincoln		Late 1880s	1967 (with population remaining into the 2010s)	Abandoned	
Grange City	Columbia					
Grisdale	Grays Harbor		1946	1986		
Guler	Klickitat				Absorbed	A small town that was absorbed into Trout Lake, Guler was a dairy and forestry community in the Gifford Pinchot National Forest. It had a small store and tavern and gas station. Once the Forest Service came in and built housing, Trout Lake and Guler merged into one town now known as Trout Lake. Some folks tend to call the town of Trout Lake "Sleeping Beauty Valley", as the mountain at the foot of Mt. Adams and between Adams and Flat Top mountain resembles a sleeping Native American Maiden said to be "Bird Woman", the bride of Adams. (also known as Patoe)
Hanford	Benton		1907 (settled)	1943 (depopulated)	Evicted/demolished	
Hanson Ferry	Asotin		1891 (post office established)	1929 (post office closed)		
Haven	Grant		1907 (post office established)	1913 (post office closed)		
Hillhurst	Pierce		1878 (post office established)	1920 (post office closed)		
Holman	Pacific		1889 (railroad stop established)	1930 (railroad stop removed)		
Hot Springs	King		1886	Before 1918	Barren	
Illia	Grant					
Interior	Whitman					
Jameson	Douglas		1906 (post office established)	1912 (post office closed)		
Jericho	Grant					
Jerita	Whitman					
Kennedy						
Kestner	Grays Harbor		1891	1986		De-facto abandoned in 1939.
Kenova	Whitman					
Kerriston	King		1904 (post office established)	1935 (post office closed)		
Keystone	Adams					
Knappton	Pacific		1871 (post office established)	1943 (post office closed)		
Kopiah	Lewis		1906 (post office established)	After 1930		
Ladow	Whitman					
Laurel	Whatcom	between Glenwood and Trout Lake		Early 1960s		A small town part of Broughten Lumber Company.
Lester	King		1891 or 1892	About 1984	Demolished/barren	
Levey	Franklin					
Liberty	Kittitas		1873	After 1960	Historic	Abandoned gold mining town associated with an 1873 gold rush.
Liberty Bond	Klickitat	Between Appleton and Glenwood		Around 1930s		A former logging camp and town
Lindberg	Lewis		1911 (post office established)			
Loop Loop	Okanogan					
Mack						
Manito						
Martindale	Franklin					
McAdam	Franklin					
McGees	Jefferson					
McGowan	Pacific		1853 (established)	April 15, 1939 (post office closed)	Abandoned	
Melmont	Pierce		1900	Early 1920s	Barren	
Mendota	Lewis		1909 (post office established)	1923 (post office closed)		
Mineral City	Snohomish	North of Galena on Silver Creek	1873 (settled as Silver City) 1892 (established as Mineral City)		Barren	
Mock	Spokane					
Molson	Okanogan		1900	August 1967 (post office closed)	Historic	
Monohon	King		1888	1925		
Monte Cristo	Snohomish		About 1889	1983	Barren/neglected	
Moonax	Klickitat			Around 1940	Submerged	Railroad station submerged underwater.
Moore	Chelan		1892 (post office established)	1955 (post office closed)		
Mora	Clallam		1891 (post office established)	1942 (post office closed)	Barren	
Mottinger	Benton		1908 (post office established)	1951 (post office closed)		
Nagrom	King		1911 (post office established)	Before 1984		
Old Toroda	Okanogan		About 1897			Not to be confused with Toroda, which was moved and renamed Bodie.
Osceola	King		Around 1900		Abandoned	
Pacific City	Pacific		About 1848	1865 (post office closed)		
Page	King					
Park	Whatcom		1884 (post office established)	1925 (post office closed)		
Penawawa	Whitman		1871			Named after a nearby creek at Union Flat, the town of Penawawa lay twelve miles west of Almota. Its first permanent settler, Mr. Ed Johnson, arrived in 1871 and raised cattle. In 1872, the territorial road running from Walla Walla to Colville stopped at the settlement and helped its economy greatly. It was platted in 1877 by founders Emsley Flincher, C.C. Cram and Francis Marion Byrd. Cram owned a ferry business on the other side of the Snake River and Penawawa grew as a ferry station and an exchange station that kept fresh horses for the stage coach route from Spokane to Pendleton. It was widely used until the highway was built and bypassed Penawawa for Central Ferry instead. There was also a railroad in the vicinity, located near Camas Prairie Road. The Penawawa post office was in existence from 1872 to 1937. Their school, which had begun sometime before 1890, consolidated with Colfax in 1940. The cemetery was also moved to Colfax in 1966 due to the likelihood of water levels rising from construction (beginning 1963) of the Little Goose Dam.
Pinkney City	Stevens		1859	After 1882		
Pleasant View	Walla Walla		1894			
Pluvius	Pacific	Watershed divide of the Chehalis and Willapa rivers	1891-1892	Voting precinct only by 1950s		Named after the Roman god, Jupiter, by the construction crew of a Northern Pacific Railroad line, due to heavy rainfall during the build.
Providence	Adams					Near where the town of Servia stood.
Purrington	Whitman					
Renslow	Kittitas					
Riparia	Whitman		1882 (post office established)	1963 (post office closed)		
Robinson	Okanogan		1900 (post office established)	1902 (post office closed)		
Rockdale	King		1912 (post office established)	1915 (post office closed)		
Rockwell	Adams					
Rodna	Spokane		1912 (post office established)	1931 (post office closed)		
Roza	Kittitas		1904 (post office established)	1935 (post office closed)		
Ruby	Okanogan	48°29′52″N 119°43′34″W	Spring 1886	1893		Not the Ruby in Pend Oreille County.
Ryan	Stevens		1897 (post office established)	1912 (post office closed)		
Rye	Kittitas					
Sanderson	Douglas		1908 (post office established)	1920 (post office closed)		
Sauk City	Skagit	Near Rockport	1880s (original town), 1901 (new town)	1897 (original town), early 20th century (new town)		
Seahaven	Pacific		Late 1880s	1891 (post office closed)		
Seltice	Whitman					
Servia	Adams					
Shanako						
Shano	Adams					
Sheridan	King		1892 (post office established)	1895 (post office closed)		
Sherman	Lincoln		1880s-1890s		Abandoned	
Shuksan	Whatcom		1897		Barren	
Skagit City	Skagit		1868	Early 1910s	Abandoned	
Standard (Green's Spur)	Whatcom	Between Acme and Clipper on the SR 9, directly south of Homesteader Rd.	1908 (post office established)	1920 (post office closed)	Historic	
Swift						
Synarep	Okanogan					
Taunton	Adams		1908 (post office established)	1913 (post office closed)		
Taylor	King		1893	1947	Evicted/barren	
Teske	Adams					
Thavis	Adams					
Theon	Asotin		1884	1909 (post office closed)		
Tono	Thurston		1907	1976	Barren	
Trinity	Chelan		Around 1914			
Unfried	Garfield		1910 (post office established)	1917 (post office closed)		
Union Center	Whitman					
Vail	Thurston		1930 (post office established)	1963 (post office closed)		
Walters	Whitman					
Walville	Lewis		1903 (post office established)	1936 (post office closed)		
Wellington	King		1893	After 1929	Demolished	Renamed Tye
Weston	King		Around 1885-1886	Around 1915	Barren	
White Bluffs	Benton		1861	1943	Barren	
Whitney	Skagit		1882 (platted)	1914 (post office closed)		
Wilcox	Whitman		1892 (post office established)	1935 (post office closed)		
Winesap	Chelan		1909 (post office established)	1944 (post office closed)		
Zindel	Asotin		1902 (post office established)	1912 (post office closed)		
