= Keystone, Washington =

Keystone, Washington may refer to:

- Keystone, Adams County, Washington, an unincorporated community
- Keystone, Island County, Washington an unincorporated community
