= Eureka, Washington =

Unincorporated community in Washington, US

- Unincorporated community
- Location within Washington (state) Location within the United States
- Country: United States
- State: Washington
- County: Walla Walla
- Platted: 1904
- Elevation: 1,063 ft (324 m)
- Time zone: UTC-8 (Pacific (PST))
  - Summer (DST): UTC-7 (PDT)
- GNIS feature ID: 1504771

Eureka is an unincorporated community in Walla Walla County, in the U.S. state of Washington.

== History ==
Eureka was laid out in 1904, and named after the Eureka Flat in which it is located. A post office called Eureka was established in 1889, and remained in operation until 1964.

Eureka Junction, a railroad and telegraph station, was constructed here in 1888 by the Oregon & Washington Territory Railroad Company. By 1889, the Eureka Flat line had connected to Walla Walla and nearby Pleasant View. Eureka became an important hub along the line as the area found itself in a wheat growing boom spurred on by Willard H. "Wheat King" Babcock. He purchased much of the surrounding land from Northern Pacific Railway who had also assumed control of the rail line by this point.

Northern Pacific began referring to the place as simply Eureka. In November 1975, then owners Burlington Northern filed to abandon the railroad branch.
