= Golden, Washington =

Ghost town in Okanogan County, Washington

- Ghost town
- Location within Washington (state) Location within the United States
- Coordinates: 48°53′42″N 119°31′24″W
- Country: United States
- State: Washington
- County: Okanogan
- Founded: 1887
- Time zone: UTC-8 (Pacific (PST))
  - Summer (DST): UTC-7 (PDT)

Golden is a ghost town in Okanogan County, Washington, United States. Golden was a mining town which was founded around 1887. The discovery of gold in the area led to the creation of Golden. By 1892 more than thirty buildings were located between the mines and Wannacut Lake. The town was called Golden due to the promise continued gold in the area. Golden had a population of 300 in its heyday. The town had a general store, restaurant, saloon and post office along with other false fronted businesses. As the gold became depleted the town became more deserted. By 1910 under 100 people remained in Golden. The town eventually became a ghost town. The depression of the thirties brought some new inhabitants to Golden, but eventually it was deserted. Today little remains of the town.
