= Kerrison =

Kerrison is a surname. Notable people with the surname include:

- Sir Edward Kerrison, 1st Baronet, GCH, KCB (1776–1853), British Army officer and politician
- Sir Edward Kerrison, 2nd Baronet (1821–1886), British Conservative Party politician
- Shane Kerrison (born 1965), former Australian rules footballer who played for Collingwood in the Australian Football League

== See also ==
- Kerrison Baronets, of Hoxne Hall in the County of Suffolk, a title in the Baronetage of the United Kingdom
- Kerrison Predictor, one of the first fully automated anti-aircraft fire-control systems (designed by Major A. V. Kerrison)
- Kerrison rongeur, a surgical instrument for removing bone material
- Kerriston, Washington, a ghost town
