= Tamarack Peak (Washington) =

Mountain summit located on the borders of Okanogan County and Whatcom County

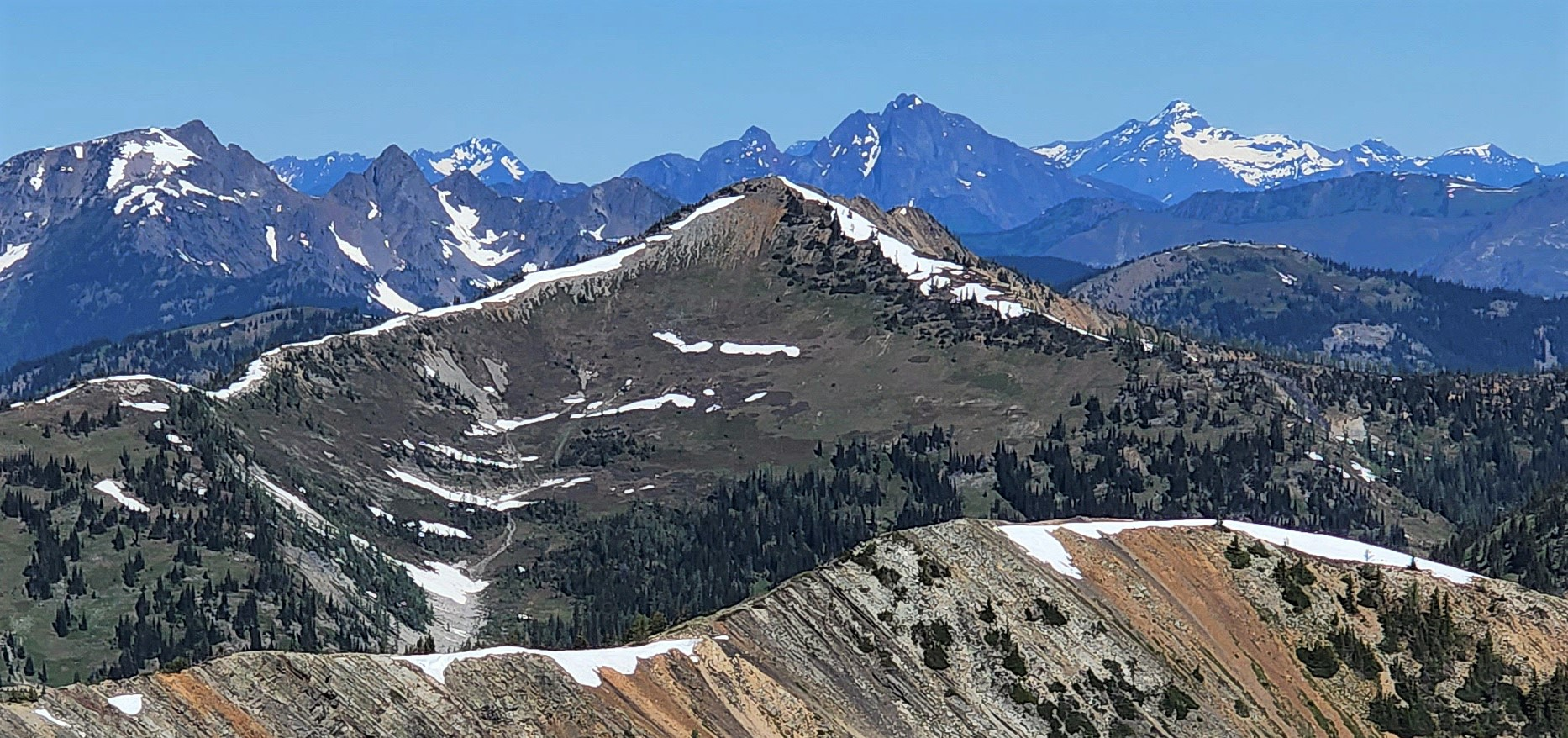
- Southeast aspect, centered

Highest point
- Elevation: 7,290 ft (2,222 m)
- Prominence: 1,033 ft (315 m)
- Parent peak: Slate Peak (7,440 ft)
- Isolation: 2.93 mi (4.72 km)
- Coordinates: 48°46′24″N 120°43′32″W

Naming
- Etymology: Tamarack

Geography
- Location within Washington (state) Location within the United States
- Interactive map of Tamarack Peak
- Country: United States
- State: Washington
- County: Okanogan / Whatcom
- Protected area: Pasayten Wilderness
- Parent range: Okanogan Range; North Cascades; Cascade Range
- Topo map: USGS Pasayten Peak

Tamarack Peak is a 7,290-foot (2,222-metre) mountain summit located on the border shared by Okanogan County and Whatcom County in Washington state.

== Description ==
Tamarack Peak is part of the Okanogan Range which is a sub-range of the North Cascades. The mountain is situated 19 miles (31 km) northwest of Mazama on the boundary line of the Pasayten Wilderness, on land managed by the Okanogan–Wenatchee National Forest. The nearest higher peak is Pasayten Peak, 2.93 miles (4.72 km) to the east-northeast. Precipitation runoff from Slate Peak's east slope drains to the Pasayten River, whereas the west slope drains into Barron Creek and the south slope into Bonita Creek which are both in the Skagit River drainage basin. Topographic relief is significant as the summit rises 2,300 feet (700 meters) above Barron Creek in 0.75 mile (1.2 km). Gold was discovered below Tamarack Peak in Bonita Creek by Alex Barron in 1892 and the boomtown of Barron sprang up. The Pacific Crest Trail traverses the east slope of the peak. An ascent of the peak via this trail involves hiking 8.2 miles (round-trip) with 640-feet of elevation gain. This mountain's toponym has been officially adopted by the U.S. Board on Geographic Names, and refers to the larch tree, or tamarack, which is common in this area.

== Climate ==
Most weather fronts originate in the Pacific Ocean, and travel northeast toward the Cascade Mountains. As fronts approach the North Cascades, they are forced upward by the peaks of the Cascade Range, causing them to drop their moisture in the form of rain or snowfall onto the Cascades (Orographic lift). As a result, the west side of the North Cascades experiences higher precipitation than the east side, especially during the winter months in the form of snowfall. During winter months, weather is usually cloudy, but due to high pressure systems over the Pacific Ocean that intensify during summer months, there is often little or no cloud cover during the summer. July through October are the best months to visit in terms of favorable weather and the Forest Service access road being open for the season, however, smoke from distant wildfires may potentially reduce visibility, and smoky summer conditions have been increasing with climate change.

== Geology ==
The North Cascades features some of the most rugged topography in the Cascade Range with craggy peaks, spires, ridges, and deep glacial valleys. Geological events occurring many years ago created the diverse topography and drastic elevation changes over the Cascade Range leading to the various climate differences.

The history of the formation of the Cascade Mountains dates back millions of years ago to the late Eocene Epoch. With the North American Plate overriding the Pacific Plate, episodes of volcanic igneous activity persisted. In addition, small fragments of the oceanic and continental lithosphere called terranes created the North Cascades about 50 million years ago.

During the Pleistocene period dating back over two million years ago, glaciation advancing and retreating repeatedly scoured the landscape leaving deposits of rock debris. The U-shaped cross section of the river valleys is a result of recent glaciation. Uplift and faulting in combination with glaciation have been the dominant processes which have created the tall peaks and deep valleys of the North Cascades area.

== Gallery ==
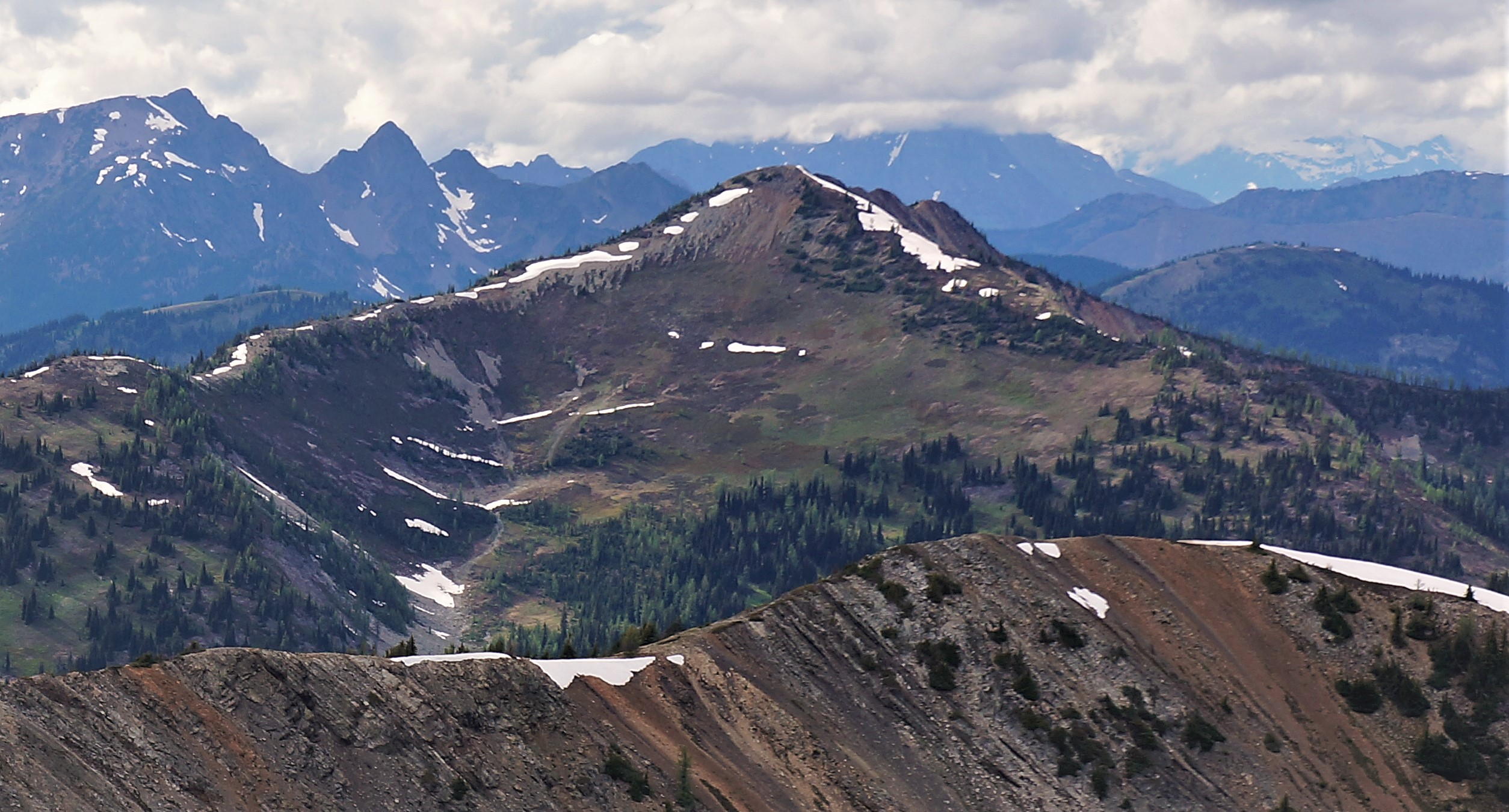
Tamarack Peak viewed from Slate Peak

== See also ==
- Geography of the North Cascades
- Geology of the Pacific Northwest
