= Rockwell, Washington =

Ghost town in Washington (state)

- Ghost town
- Location within Washington (state) Location within the United States
- Coordinates: 47°08′51″N 118°00′38″W
- Country: United States
- State: Washington
- County: Adams
- Time zone: UTC-8 (Pacific (PST))
  - Summer (DST): UTC-7 (PDT)

Rockwell was a town in Adams County, Washington. The GNIS classifies it as a populated place.

The community was named for the nature of the county and a well dug into rock near the town site.

== See also ==
- List of ghost towns in Washington
