= Hillhurst, Washington =

Ghost town in Washington (state)

- Ghost town
- Location within Washington (state) Location within the United States
- Coordinates: 47°05′12″N 122°30′25″W
- Country: United States
- State: Washington
- County: Pierce
- Established: 1878
- Time zone: UTC-8 (Pacific (PST))
  - Summer (DST): UTC-7 (PDT)

Hillhurst is an extinct town in Pierce County, in the U.S. state of Washington.

A post office called Hillhurst was established in 1878, and remained in operation until 1920. The community was named for a hill near the original town site.

What remains of Hillhurst is now enclosed by Joint Base Lewis-McChord.
