= Ryan, Washington =

Ghost town in Washington (state)

- Ghost town
- Location within Washington (state) Location within the United States
- Coordinates: 48°48′51″N 117°58′02″W
- Country: United States
- State: Washington
- County: Stevens
- Established: 1897
- Time zone: UTC-8 (Pacific (PST))
  - Summer (DST): UTC-7 (PDT)

Ryan is a ghost town in Stevens County, Washington, United States. The GNIS classifies it as a populated place.

A post office named Ryan was established in 1897, and remained in operation until 1912.
