= Barneston, Washington =

Ghost town in Washington (state)

- Ghost town
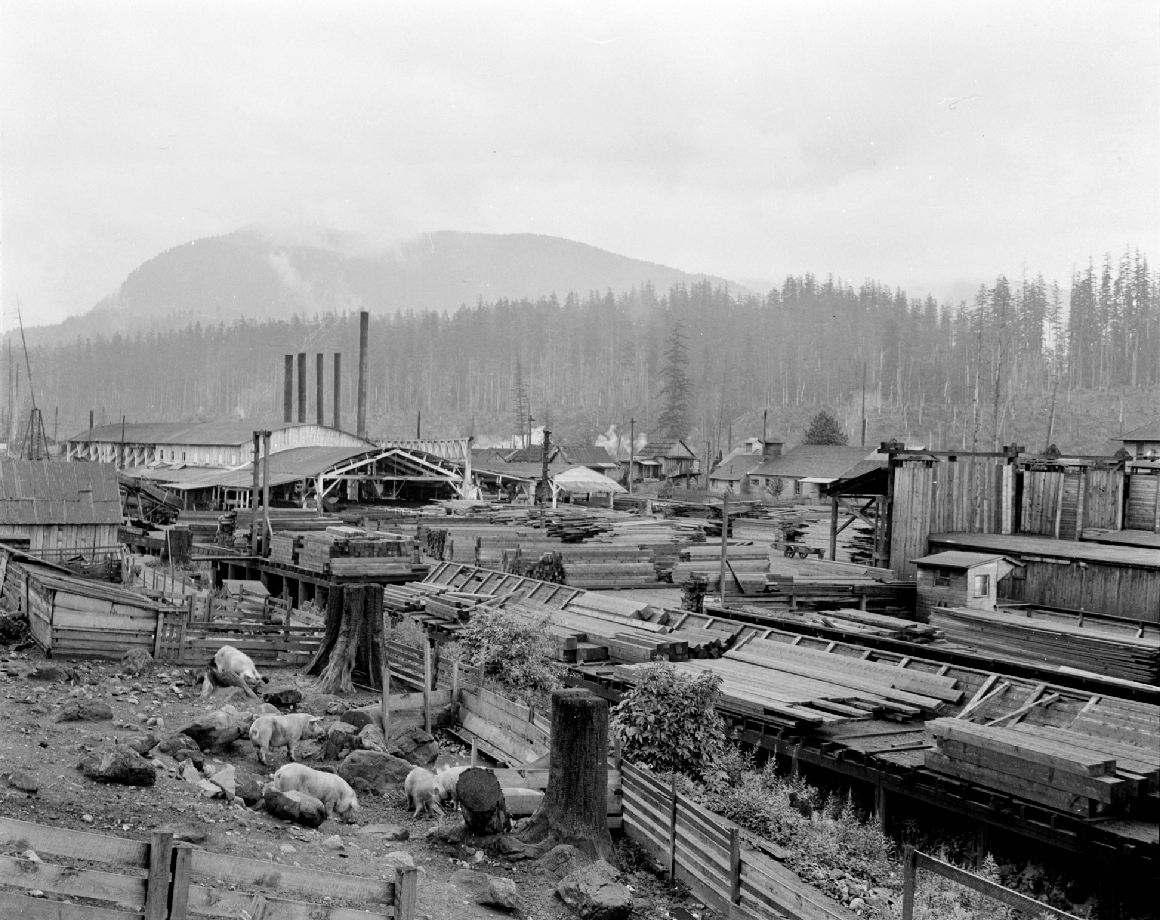
- Stockyards and sawmill at Barneston, 1911

- Location within Washington (state) Location within the United States
- Coordinates: 47°23′15″N 121°51′40″W
- Country: United States
- State: Washington
- County: King
- Established: 1901
- Time zone: UTC-8 (Pacific (PST))
  - Summer (DST): UTC-7 (PDT)

Barneston is an extinct town in King County, in the U.S. state of Washington. The GNIS classifies it as a populated place.

Barneston was established following the construction of a lumber mill in the Cedar River watershed, along with homes for its employees. On June 12, 1901, a post office was built, and the town was named after John G. Barnes who was the secretary and treasurer of the Kent Lumber Company that owned the land.

Barneston was distinguished from other logging communities by its relatively large Japanese immigrant population, which comprised about 35 percent of the workforce. The main Japanese camp was located north of town, though Japanese children were schooled with the rest of the Barneston schoolchildren. One of the Japanese lumber mill laborers operated a Japanese style bathhouse for the Japanese community's use.

The original post office remained in operation until 1924, when the city of Seattle disallowed all human habitation within the Cedar River watershed in order to keep the water pure.
