= Haven, Washington =

Ghost town in Washington (state)

- Ghost town
- Location within Washington (state) Location within the United States
- Coordinates: 46°39′06″N 119°40′49″W
- Country: United States
- State: Washington
- County: Grant
- Established: 1907
- Time zone: UTC-8 (Pacific (PST))
  - Summer (DST): UTC-7 (PDT)

Haven is an extinct town in Grant County, in the U.S. state of Washington.

A post office called Haven was established in 1907, and remained in operation until 1913. The community has the name of Henry H. Haven.
