= Belcher Camp, Washington =

Ghost town in Washington (state)

- Ghost town
- Location within Washington (state) Location within the United States
- Coordinates: 48°41′01″N 118°40′13″W
- Country: United States
- State: Washington
- County: Ferry
- Founded: approx. 1897

Population (1906)
  - Total: 72
- Time zone: UTC-8 (Pacific (PST))
  - Summer (DST): UTC-7 (PDT)

Belcher Camp is a ghost town located in Ferry County, Washington, United States. The town is located on upper Lambert Creek, nearly ten miles northeast of Republic. The town was founded around 1897 when Iron ore was discovered in the vicinity. The Belcher Mountain Mining Company began operations in the area. By 1906 the town had a population of about 72. The town contained a post office, large bunkhouse for single miners, a general store, five or six houses and a railroad. There was even a Belcher Mountain Railroad line. Eventually the mine folded and the town disappeared.
