= Burnt Ridge, Washington =

- Ghost town
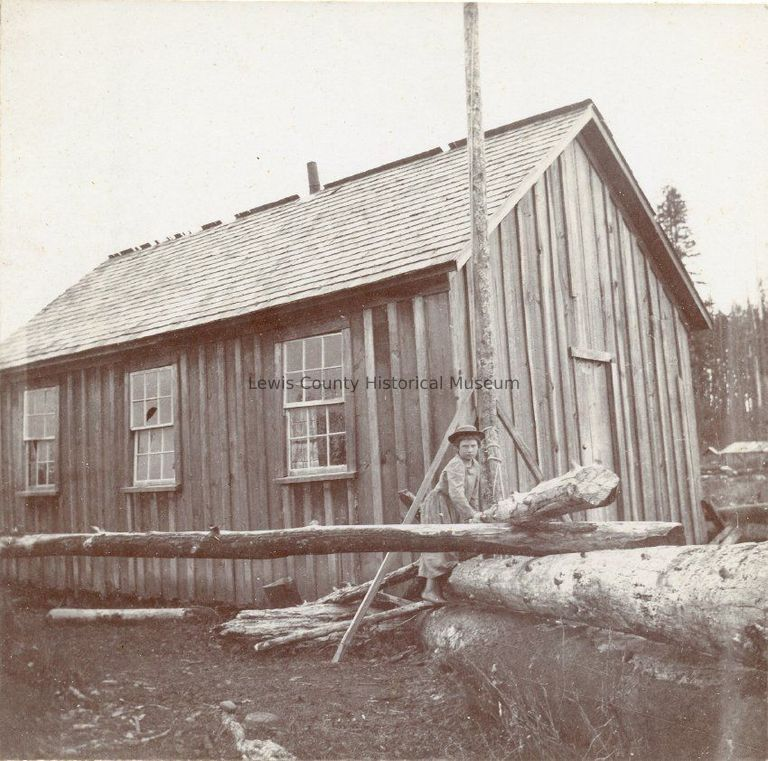
- Burnt Ridge School, ca. 1900

- Location within Washington (state) Location within the United States
- Coordinates: 46°35′6″N 122°37′58″W
- Country: United States
- State: Washington
- County: Lewis
- Established: 1880s
- Elevation: 1,175 ft (358 m)
- Time zone: UTC-8 (Pacific (PST))
  - Summer (DST): UTC-7 (PDT)
- GNIS feature ID: 1528678

Burnt Ridge, a landform and locale, was a small community that existed approximately between the 1880s and into the 1940s. The town was located approximately 4 miles (6.4 km) east of Onalaska.

== History ==
Telephone lines were connected to the community at a local store in 1909. The town had a dance hall under the Burnt Ridge Community Club and another hall for the Burnt Ridge American Legion. A church known as the Full Gospel Church burned down in 1935. The area became known, starting in the late-20th century, for a 3,000-acre (1,200 ha) privately owned parcel with a large horse trail system that would sometimes be open to the public. An annual event known as "Fun Ride" took place and riders traversed over a 12-mile (19 km) loop trail.

== Education ==
The Burnt Ridge school began in a log cabin structure, built out of one tree, in the late 1880s. It was replaced with a new building in 1905. The school was the sight of a disagreement that escalated to the county attorney general when a dance, deemed by some residents to be inappropriate, was held in the building during the Christmas season in 1913. The enrollment of Burnt Ridge District No. 40 was never large, with 11 students counted in 1914. That same year, the school adopted a "home credit" system which included credits for such tasks as cleaning one's teeth, feeding livestock, going to bed at a certain time, making or preparing food, or completing other various household chores.

A new two-room schoolhouse, made of hollow tile and containing a bell, was built in the 1920s. The students were visited by Governor Roland H. Hartley in 1929 and the schoolhouse underwent extensive renovations, including plumbing and the repair of the veranda, in 1937 by the Works Progress Administration (WPA). Due to a consolidation of the district with Onalaska, the school ceased being used in 1945. The school building was sold in September 1962 after earlier attempts were hindered for legal reasons. The grounds, listed at 2.65 acres (1.07 ha), were put up for auction a month later; the land sale was completed for $75.

== Infrastructure ==
In the area that was once the small community of Burnt Ridge is a 2,000 foot (610 metres) runway known as the Burnt Ridge Airstrip (WN74).
