= Almota, Washington =

Ghost town in Washington (state)

- Ghost town
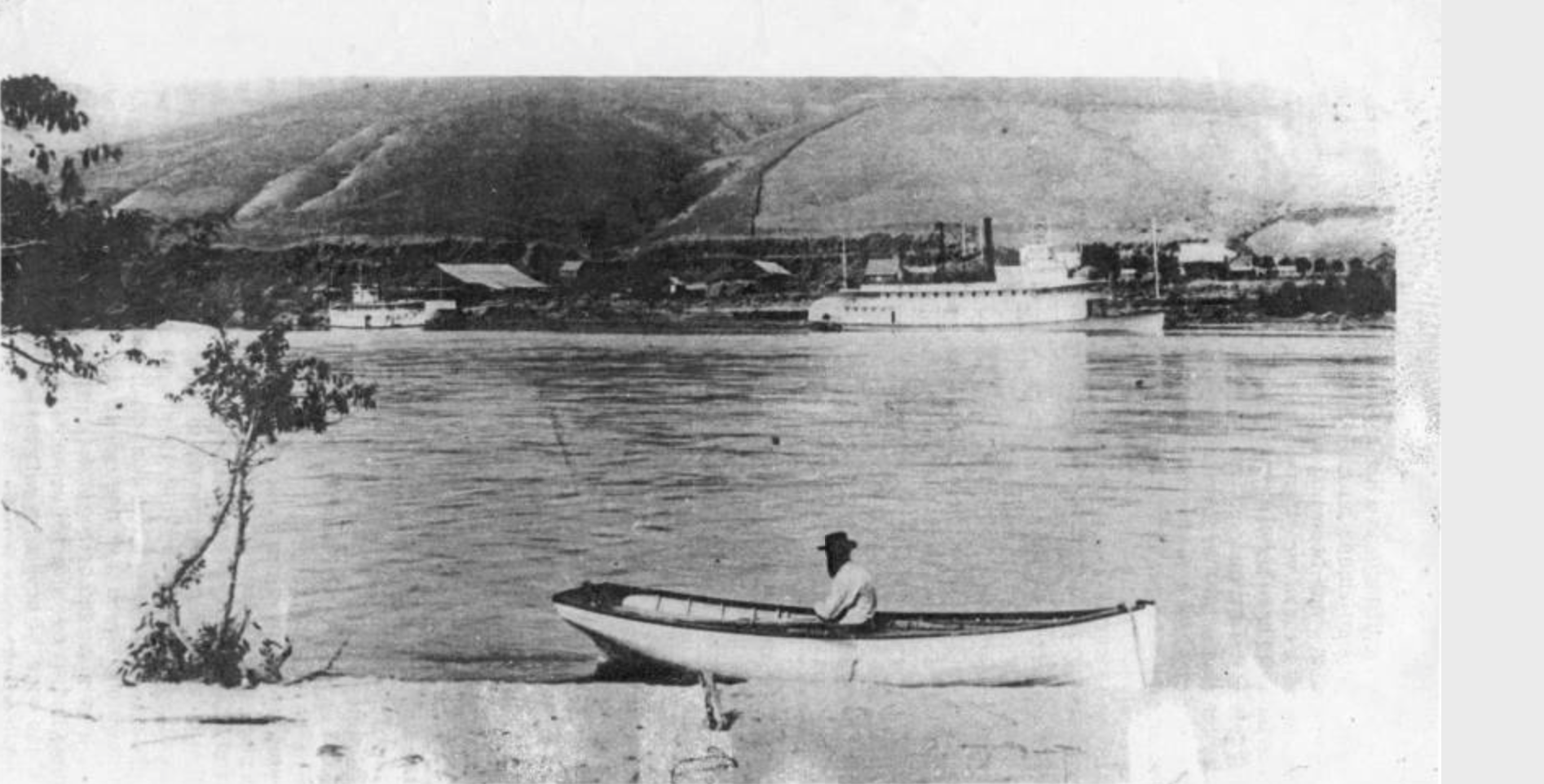
- Looking north towards Almota, c.1880

- Location within Washington (state) Location within the United States
- Coordinates: 46°42′11″N 117°28′10″W
- Country: United States
- State: Washington
- County: Whitman
- Established: 1878
- Time zone: UTC-8 (Pacific (PST))
  - Summer (DST): UTC-7 (PDT)

Almota (/ælˈmoʊtə/) is a ghost town in Whitman County, in the U.S. state of Washington. The GNIS classifies it as a populated place.

== Native American settlement ==
The Almota area had been historically occupied by the Almotipu band of the Nez Perce peoples who lived in several villages on the south shore of the Snake River, one of which was known as Alamotin (Nez Perce for "The Soaring Flame"). The Lewis and Clark Expedition passed through the area on their return journey from the Pacific Coast, camping in the area below Almota creek on October 11, 1805, although the exact site has not been found.

== History of Almota ==
Almota was first surveyed for a townsite in the late 1870s following the removal of rapids from the Snake River that would finally allow uninterrupted boat traffic to directly reach the wheat growers of the Palouse. The community took its name from Almota creek, which enters the Snake River at the site. Almota became an important wheat shipping port for the region as well as a ferry crossing.

A post office was established in 1878, and remained in operation until 1961. In 1917 it was reported as on the line of the Oregon–Washington Railroad and Navigation Company, which is currently part of the Riparian subdivision of the Great Northwest Railroad that connects the Tri-Cities to Lewiston, Idaho. The construction of the Little Goose Dam from 1963 to 1970 subsequently flooded what was left of the original village. The only buildings at Almota today comprise a large grain shipping terminal operated by the Almota Elevator Co., which is built on fill over the original

townsite.

1850	
1860	
1870	
1880	
1890	
1900	275
1910	175
1920	75
1930	
1940	
1950	
1960	
1970	
1980	
1990	
2000	
2010	
2020	
2023 (est.)	
