= Jameson, Washington =

Ghost town in Washington (state)

- Ghost town
- Location within Washington (state) Location within the United States
- Coordinates: 47°42′50″N 119°39′50″W
- Country: United States
- State: Washington
- County: Douglas
- Established: 1906
- Time zone: UTC-8 (Pacific (PST))
  - Summer (DST): UTC-7 (PDT)

Jameson is a ghost town in Douglas County, in the U.S. state of Washington.

A post office called Jameson was established in 1906, and remained in operation until 1912. The community bore the name of an early settler.
