= Alpine, King County, Washington =

Ghost town in Washington (state)

Alpine, Washington
- Ghost town
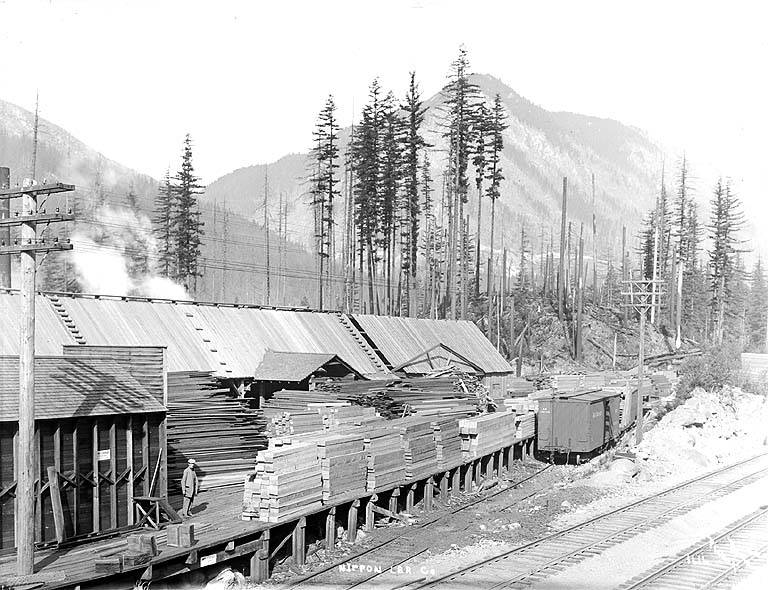
- The Nippon Lumber Company in Alpine, c. 1912

- Location within Washington (state) Location within the United States
- Coordinates: 47°42′35.94″N 121°14′18.59″W
- Country: United States
- State: Washington
- County: King
- Founded: late 19th century
- Time zone: UTC-8 (Pacific (PST))
  - Summer (DST): UTC-7 (PDT)

Alpine was a town in the Cascade Mountains, near Skykomish, Washington. Founded in the late 19th century and originally named Nippon, it was first built to house Japanese railway workers. Another nearby railway town, Corea, housed Korean workers. About 8 miles (13 km) west of Stevens Pass, Alpine had only rail access, and was a mile from the nearest road.

The local lumber baron changed the town's name from Nippon to Alpine in 1903. In 1917 it was reported as a station on the Great Northern Railway. Its population peaked at 200–300 people; after the nearby woods were logged out, it was evacuated and intentionally burned, around 1929.

Author Mary Daheim, whose family, the Dawsons, lived in Alpine approximately 1916–1922 (before she was born) sets her "Emma Lord" mystery novels in a fictional, surviving town of Alpine.

== See also ==
- List of ghost towns in Washington
