= Liberty, Washington =

Unincorporated Community in Washington, US

Liberty, Washington Meaghersville
- Unincorporated community
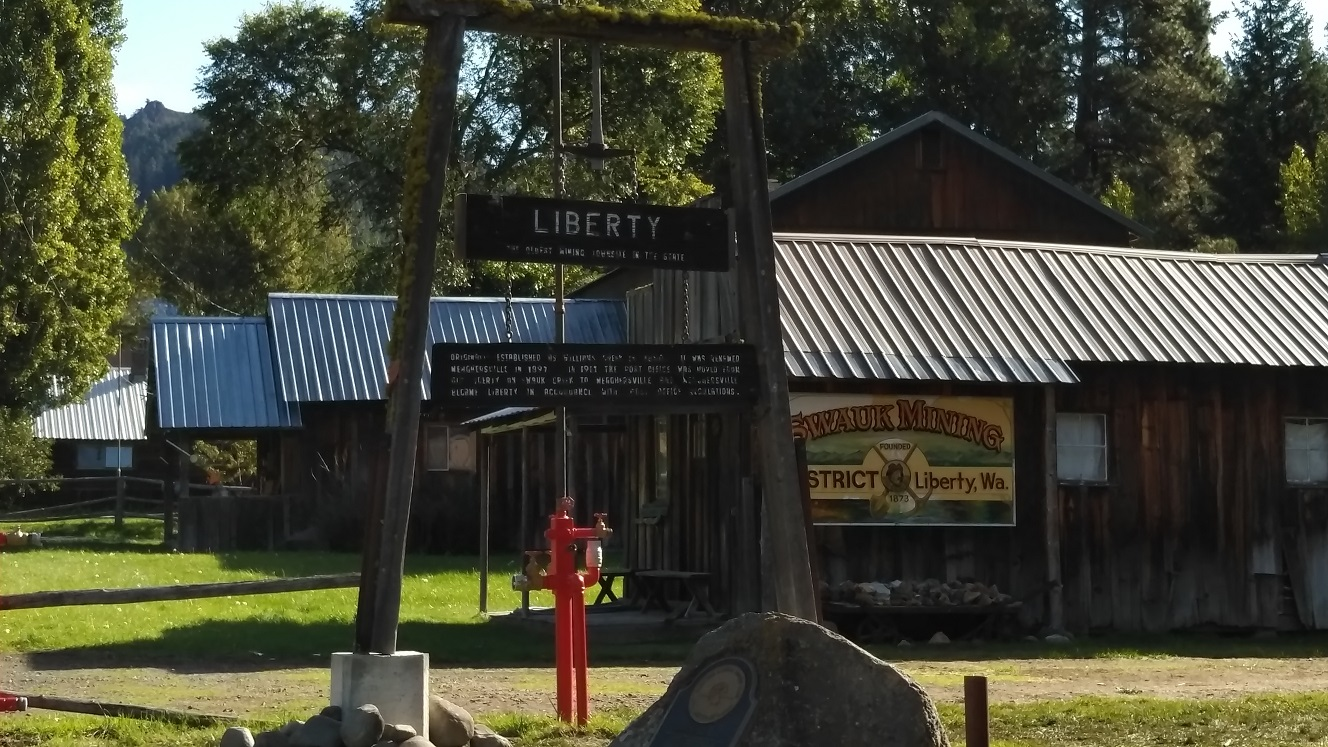
- Liberty in 2019

- Location within Washington (state)
- Coordinates: 47°15′13″N 120°39′55″W
- Country: United States
- State: Washington
- County: Kittitas
- First site settled: 1873
- Establishment of Liberty: 1892
- Current site settled: 1895

- Liberty Historic District
- U.S. National Register of Historic Places
- Location: Both sides of Williams Creek Wagon Rd., Liberty, Washington
- Area: 23 acres (9.3 ha)
- Built: 1867
- NRHP reference No.: 74001965
- Added to NRHP: October 15, 1974

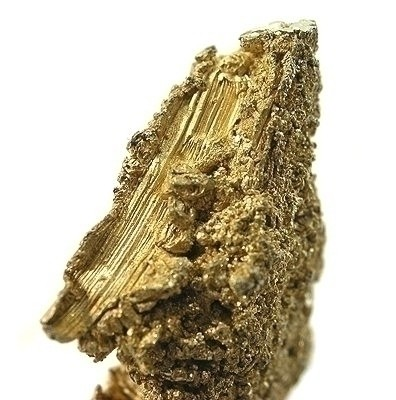
Crystalline gold specimen from Liberty (detail), overall size 3.6 x 2.1 x 1.0 cm

Liberty is a community in Kittitas County, Washington, United States. Though not fully abandoned, Liberty has been described as a "living ghost town" with a population of 12 as of 2023. Liberty is notable for producing specimens of crystalline gold and Ellensburg Blue Agates.

The earliest settlement in this area was known as Williams Creek, and was located on Swauk Creek. This settlement was given the name Liberty in 1892. In 1895, a second settlement known as Meaghersville (after early settler Thomas Meaghers) was built up Williams Creek. As the new site attracted more people and development than the old, Meaghersville became known as New Liberty, and the original townsite as Old Liberty. The last structure in Old Liberty burned in 1962, and the current town remains on the Meaghersville site.

== Old Liberty ==
The first mining activity in the area took place in 1867, when a party of four prospectors (including deaf-mute Benton Goodwin) panned for gold at the confluence of the Swauk and Williams Creeks, finding only gold dust. Six years later, Goodwin returned to the same site with another party where he found a two-dollar gold nugget. According to a 1963 interview given by miner and "old timer" Clarence Jordin,

Eight men were prospecting up the Stuart Range and down Engels Creek. On the trip they all got lousy, so they decided to make camp to boil their clothes before they got back to civilization. Benton Goodwin, who was deaf and dumb, went down to the creek for some buckets of water. He turned over a rock and found a $2 nugget. He put the nugget in his mouth and carried the buckets of water in both hands. He struggled up the bank mumbling and squawking in excitement. The men thought a bear was chasing him and got out their rifles. He pushed them back, put down the water, and opened his mouth.

The ensuing gold rush resulted in the 1873 establishment of the Swauk Creek Mining District. The original settlement was at this site, before moving two miles up Williams Creek. In the late 1880s, Chinese workers were expelled from the settlement.

By 1892, the population and mining activity in the camp had grown large enough to necessitate road construction and prompt the building of a 30-by-60 foot public hall. A post office was established, with Gus Nelson as the first postmaster. The proposed name of "Swauk" was deemed too similar to Sauk, and the name Liberty was given instead.

Per 1893 newspaper reports, the town's mining industry was mostly suffering from a lack of investment. By 1894, claims began to be bought up by out-of-town capital.

== Meaghersville and New Liberty ==
After 1895, development interest in the Swauk valley shifted to Williams Creek, where Thomas Meaghers and Charles Bigney had claims. The resulting settlement, first called New Yakima, then called Meaghersville, drew people and development away from what then became known as Old Liberty. Finally, the post office moved from Old Liberty in 1916.

In 1898, many small claims were bought by the Swauk Creek Mining Co. and Cascade Mining Co., both of Wisconsin. A July 8, 1899 report in the Ellensburg Capital noted that "a great portion of the people in the camp are depending largely for their work on the Cascade Company." The Klondike gold rush drew many miners away, and by 1901, the population of Liberty was declining, and the mining opportunities were diminishing.

In 1925, a dredging operation began on Swauk Creek. The operation was conceived by local promoter Frank Bryant of the Swauk Mining and Dredging Company. Later that year, to raise more capital, Bryant leased all holdings of that corporation to the Kittitas Gold Mining Co., which was capitalized at one million dollars and governed by Bryant, his brother, and notables from around the region. The dredger was brought in from the Powder River, Oregon, and dredging began in February of 1926. Later that year, the dredger was found to be too large for the shallow Swauk Creek, the corporation folded, and the blame was placed on Bryant.

== Liberty Historical District ==
Liberty was added to the National Register of Historic Places in 1974. Buildings contributing to the designation of Liberty Historical District include:

- Hotel and boarding house: a two-story woodframe structure built in the 1890s.
- Grocery store: a one-story woodframe structure built in the 1890s.
- Butcher shop: a one-story woodframe structure built in 1894.
- Log house: built in the 1890s by miners and moved from the Old Liberty Mine in 1944.
- Stage office: a one-room structure built in the 1890s.
