= Theon, Washington =

Ghost town in Washington (state)

- Ghost town
- Location within Washington (state) Location within the United States
- Coordinates: 46°09′17″N 117°05′46″W
- Country: United States
- State: Washington
- County: Asotin
- Established: 1884
- Elevation: 3,222 ft (982 m)
- Time zone: UTC-8 (Pacific (PST))
  - Summer (DST): UTC-7 (PDT)
- GNIS feature ID: 1514672

Theon was a town in Asotin County, Washington.

Established in 1884, Theon was named after Daniel Theon Welch, a local merchant. A post office called Theon operated from 1880 to 1909.

== See also ==
- List of ghost towns in Washington

1880	224	
1890	236	—
1900	244	13%
1910	251	20.5%
1920	169	−15%
1930		
1940		
1950		
