= Fishtrap, Washington =

Ghost town in Washington (state)

- Ghost town
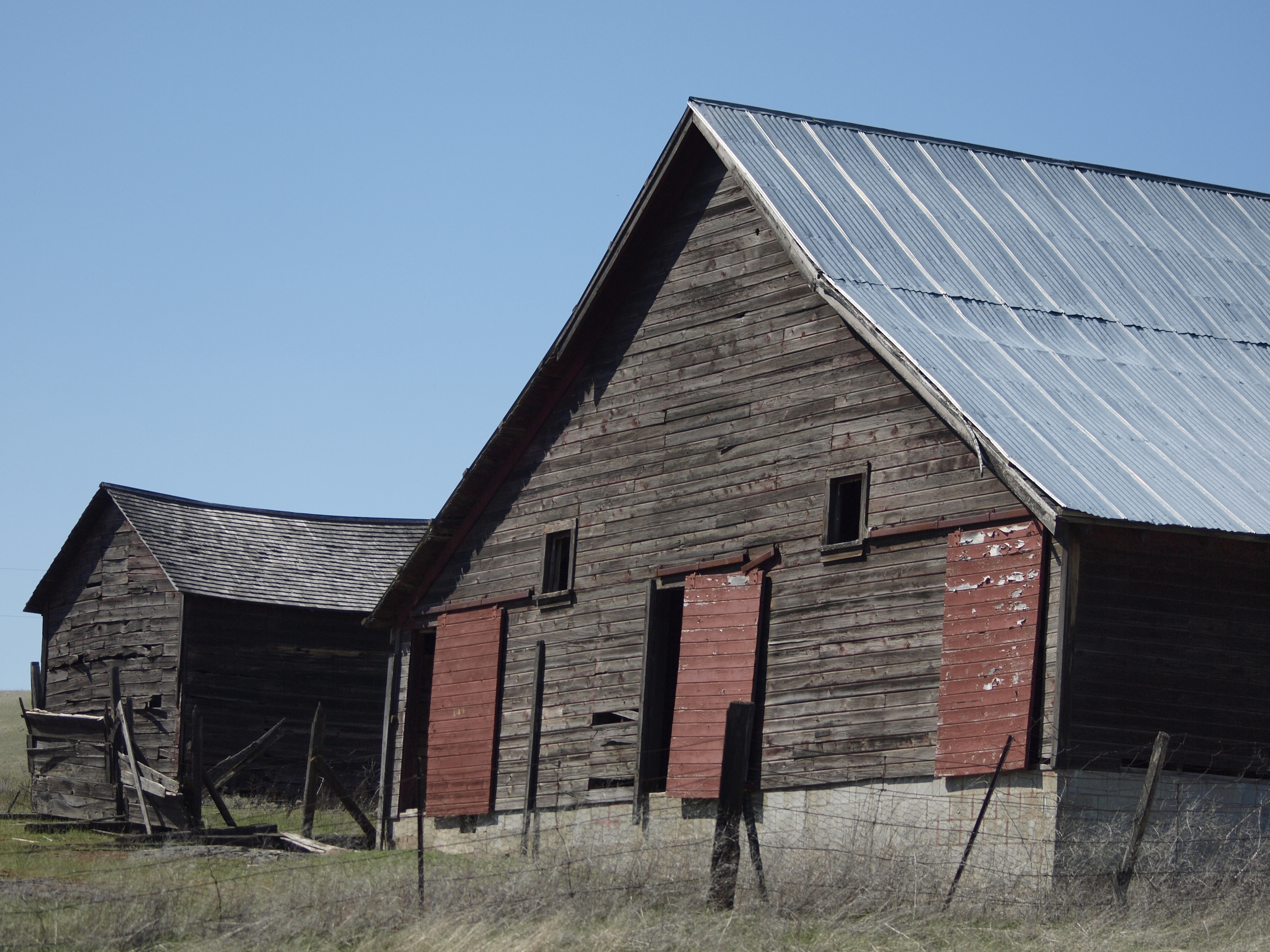
- Abandoned farm at Fishtrap

- Location within Washington (state)
- Coordinates: 47°23′19″N 117°49′51″W
- Country: United States
- State: Washington
- County: Lincoln
- Established: 1906
- Elevation: 2,290 ft (700 m)
- Time zone: UTC-8 (Pacific (PST))
  - Summer (DST): UTC-7 (PDT)
- ZIP code: 99032
- Area code: 509
- GNIS feature ID: 1510969

Fishtrap is an extinct town in Lincoln County, in the U.S. state of Washington. The GNIS classifies it as a populated place.

A post office called Fishtrap was established in 1906 on land owned by John W. Lawton, and remained in operation until 1936. A train station at this site was named Vista. The post office was named Fishtrap after Fishtrap Lake, which was so named because local Native American settlements had natural traps to catch fish there. The name was suggested by Mr. Lawton.

The Bureau of Land Management operates the 9,000-acre Fishtrap Recreation Area in the vicinity of the former community. Access to the site is off the Fishtrap exit on Interstate 90, less than a mile northwest of the townsite. The area shows examples of the Channeled Scablands landscape that dominate it.
