= Sherman, Washington =

Ghost town in Washington (state)

- Ghost town
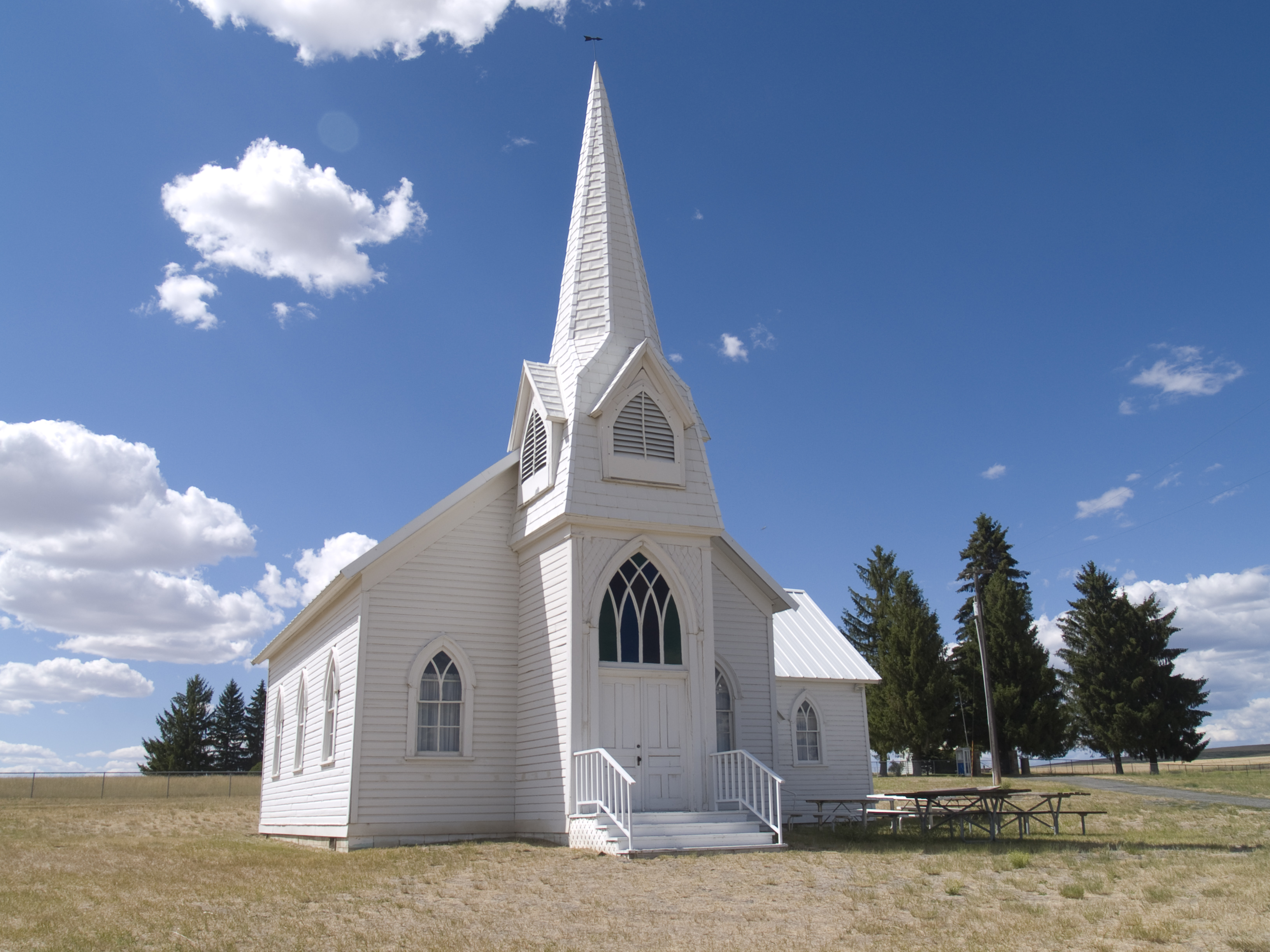
- The remaining church in Sherman

- Location within Washington (state) Location within the United States
- Coordinates: 47°49′39″N 118°36′18.4″W
- Country: United States
- State: Washington
- County: Lincoln
- Time zone: UTC-8 (Pacific (PST))
  - Summer (DST): UTC-7 (PDT)

Sherman, Washington, was a community in Lincoln County, located north of Wilbur, Washington, USA.

Sherman, like many small towns in eastern Washington, sprang up during the agricultural boom of the 1880s and 1890s, spurred by the federal government's many homesteading acts. Due to several factors, including the falling price of wheat, larger average farm sizes, and easier travel enabled by better vehicles and roads, Sherman was abandoned. A church and a cemetery remain; the school building collapsed. The Sherman community comes together every year on Memorial Day for a celebration at the church. Farm families in the area and those pioneer families whose roots included the Sherman community in earlier years gather to honor those who have served and remember their family's history as part of Sherman.

== See also ==
- List of ghost towns in Washington
