= Unfried, Washington =

Ghost town in Washington (state)

- Ghost town
- Location within Washington (state) Location within the United States
- Coordinates: 46°24′44″N 117°21′54″W
- Country: United States
- State: Washington
- County: Garfield
- Established: 1910
- Elevation: 1,627 ft (496 m)
- Time zone: UTC-8 (Pacific (PST))
  - Summer (DST): UTC-7 (PDT)
- GNIS feature ID: 1514676

Unfried is a ghost town in Garfield County, in the U.S. state of Washington.

A post office called Unfried was established in 1910, and remained in operation until 1917. The community bears the name of an early postmaster.
