= Grange City, Washington =

Ghost town in Washington (state)

- Ghost town
- Location within Washington (state) Location within the United States
- Coordinates: 46°33′00″N 118°10′48″W
- Country: United States
- State: Washington
- County: Columbia
- Elevation: 554 ft (169 m)
- Time zone: UTC-8 (Pacific (PST))
  - Summer (DST): UTC-7 (PDT)
- GNIS feature ID: 1514858

Grange City is an extinct town in Columbia County, in the U.S. state of Washington.

The community was named after the Grangers. With the advent of the railroads, the town's population dwindled.
