= Pacific City, Washington =

Ghost town in Washington (state)

- Ghost town
- Location within Washington (state) Location within the United States
- Coordinates: 46°17′01″N 124°03′20″W
- Country: United States
- State: Washington
- County: Pacific
- Platted: 1848
- Time zone: UTC-8 (Pacific (PST))
  - Summer (DST): UTC-7 (PDT)

Pacific City is an extinct town in Pacific County, in the U.S. state of Washington.

Pacific City was laid out ca. 1848. Pacific City was the original seat of Pacific County at its establishment in 1851, but was soon dissolved with the establishment of the military fort at Cape Disappointment. A post office called Pacific City was established in 1850, and remained in operation until 1865.
