= Page, Washington =

Ghost town in Washington (state)

- Ghost town
- Location within Washington (state) Location within the United States
- Coordinates: 47°17′39″N 121°45′59″W
- Country: United States
- State: Washington
- County: King
- Time zone: UTC-8 (Pacific (PST))
  - Summer (DST): UTC-7 (PDT)

Page is an extinct town in King County, in the U.S. state of Washington. The GNIS classifies it as a populated place.

It was located on the North Fork Green River, ten miles east of Palmer (by road).

The community took its name from the Page Lumber Company.
