= Pluvius, Washington =

Ghost town in Washington (state)

- Ghost town
- Location within Washington (state) Location within the United States
- Coordinates: 46°32′53″N 123°24′32.5″W
- Country: United States
- State: Washington
- County: Pacific
- Established: 1891-1892
- Elevation: 748 ft (228 m)
- Time zone: UTC-8 (Pacific (PST))
  - Summer (DST): UTC-7 (PDT)
- GNIS feature ID: 1511234

Pluvius is an extinct town in Pacific County, in the U.S. state of Washington.

== History ==
Pluvius began in the winter season between 1891 and 1892 after the build of a branch of the Northern Pacific Railroad (NP) through the area. Due to the unrelenting rainfall during the construction, rail crew informed NP headquarters that they aptly chose the name after a moniker given to the Roman god, Jupiter.

By the 1950s, the town was considered a voting precinct, listing 30 registered voters.

== Geography ==
Pluvius was located 2 miles (3.2 km) west of the Pacific and Lewis county lines. The community was situated at a divide between the watersheds of the Chehalis and Willapa rivers, known as the "hump". Washington State Route 6 and the Willapa Hills Trail bypass the extinct town.
