= Seahaven, Washington =

Ghost town in Washington (state)

- Ghost town
- Location within Washington (state) Location within the United States
- Coordinates: 46°41′15″N 123°49′22″W
- Country: United States
- State: Washington
- County: Pacific
- Platted: c. 1899
- Time zone: UTC-8 (Pacific (PST))
  - Summer (DST): UTC-7 (PDT)

Seahaven is an extinct town in Pacific County, in the U.S. state of Washington.

== History ==
Seahaven, in the state of Washington, in the Northwestern United States, was established around 1899, with land owned by realtor Thomas Potter. Located at the mouth of the Willapa River, the land was surveyed by Thomas Potter, who leased properties there and in South Bend, Washington. By 1890, the town of Seahaven had established a bank as well as a newspaper. In September 1890, a post office was established in the town, with Granville S. Loomis serving as the postmaster; that post office only remained in operation for about a year. Following Potter's death in 1901 in San Diego, and after some contention regarding his will, his property was conveyed to a 63-year-old woman he was going to marry; this included the grounds of Seahaven. Seahaven became a ghost town by the early 20th century, with its businesses either closing down or relocating to South Bend, Washington.
