= Attalia, Washington =

Ghost town in Washington (state)

- Ghost town
- Location within Washington (state) Location within the United States
- Coordinates: 46°06′28″N 118°55′12″W
- Country: United States
- State: Washington
- County: Walla Walla
- Established: 1906
- Time zone: UTC-8 (Pacific (PST))
  - Summer (DST): UTC-7 (PDT)

Attalia (/æˈtæljə/) is an extinct town in Walla Walla County, Washington, United States. The GNIS classifies it as a populated place. Attalia was located on the East shore of the Columbia River some 8 miles downriver from Burbank.

A post office called Attalia was established in 1906, and remained in operation until 1952. According to tradition, the town was named after a place in Italy. The townsite was submerged in Lake Wallula upon completion of McNary Dam in 1953.

Attalia was a stop on both the Northern Pacific Railway and the Oregon Railroad and Navigation Company in 1909.
