= Sanderson, Washington =

Ghost town in Washington (state)

- Ghost town
- Location within Washington (state) Location within the United States
- Coordinates: 47°57′42″N 119°08′34″W
- Country: United States
- State: Washington
- County: Douglas
- Established: 1908
- Time zone: UTC-8 (Pacific (PST))
  - Summer (DST): UTC-7 (PDT)

Sanderson is an extinct town in Douglas County, in the U.S. state of Washington.

A post office called Sanderson was established in 1908, and remained in operation until 1920. Thomas Sanderson, an early postmaster, gave the community his name.
