= Baird, Washington =

Ghost town in Washington, United States

- Ghost town
- Location within Washington (state) Location within the United States
- Coordinates: 47°37′13″N 119°28′11″W
- Country: United States
- State: Washington
- County: Douglas
- Established: 1896
- Time zone: UTC-8 (Pacific (PST))
  - Summer (DST): UTC-7 (PDT)

Baird is a ghost town in Douglas County, Washington, United States. Baird is part of ZIP code 99115 and is home to the Highland Cemetery (also occasionally known as the Baird Cemetery). Baird appears on a 1909 map of Douglas County. The town was located about 7 miles (11 km) west of Coulee City, on the high ground between Moses Coulee and Grand Coulee.

A post office called Baird was established in 1896, and remained in operation until 1934. James Baird, an early postmaster, gave the town his name.
