= Frankfort, Washington =

Ghost town in Washington (state)

- Ghost town
- Location within Washington (state) Location within the United States
- Coordinates: 46°16′49″N 123°45′22″W
- Country: United States
- State: Washington
- County: Pacific
- Homesteaded: 1876

Population (1960)
  - Total: 2
- Time zone: UTC-8 (Pacific (PST))
  - Summer (DST): UTC-7 (PDT)

Frankfort is a ghost town in Pacific County, Washington on the mouth of the Columbia River near Portuguese Point. First homesteaded in 1876, a planned community was platted by two promoters, Frank Bourne and Frank Scott (whence the name) in 1890. Together they envisioned a resort community at the location. As there were no roads, and access to the area was only by boat, lots were sold on the premise that the railroad would eventually build a line through the community. A post office, general store, saloon, sawmill and a hotel were built and a newspaper, the Frankfort Chronicle, was established. The financial Panic of 1893 deterred any future investors, and the town took a downhill turn.

Frankfort survived mainly as a logging town until the early years of the 20th century. No railroad line ever materialized and Frankfort began fading away. The post office closed in 1918. In 1953, Frankfort was sold to a logging company. The town's last resident died in 1964. Apart from a few derelict structures and building foundations, there are limited remnants of Frankfort. There are no public roads which lead directly to the area and access by foot is extremely difficult.
