= Nemah, Washington =

- Unincorporated community
- Location within Washington (state) Location within the United States
- Coordinates: 46°30′43″N 123°53′10″W
- Country: United States
- State: Washington
- County: Wahkiakum
- Elevation: 46 ft (14 m)
- Time zone: UTC-8 (Pacific (PST))
  - Summer (DST): UTC-7 (PDT)
- GNIS feature ID: 1511178

Nemah is an unincorporated community in Pacific County, in the U.S. state of Washington, lying on the mainland bordering Willapa Bay.

== History ==
A post office called Nemah was established in 1894, and remained in operation until 1923. The origin of the name Nemah is obscure.

The area is a popular hunting grounds for wild elk.
