= Lindberg, Washington =

Ghost town in Washington (state)

- Ghost town
- Location within Washington (state) Location within the United States
- Coordinates: 46°35′20″N 122°14′31″W
- Country: United States
- State: Washington
- County: Lewis
- Established: 1911
- Time zone: UTC-8 (Pacific (PST))
  - Summer (DST): UTC-7 (PDT)

Lindberg is an extinct town in Lewis County, in the U.S. state of Washington. Though the exact location of Lindberg is unknown, the community was located approximately 5 miles (8.0 km) west of Morton, Washington and in the present-day, is considered a neighborhood on State Route 7.

The town existed under several names, at first as Glenavon, and as Coal Canyon and Millberg. The community was a company town focused on logging and timber production, and existed as a populated area into the 1940s.

== History ==
The community was first known as Glenavon, after the Tacoma Eastern Railroad established a station at the crossing of East Fork Tilton River after the completion of a rail line from Ashford to Morton in 1910.

The Lindberg community began as a logging camp and company town under the Linco Log and Lumber Company in 1911 and was known at first as Coal Canyon. Containing a sawmill and shingle factory, a post office was established in 1911 under the Coal Canyon name but after the town burned down in a 1918 fire, the community was rebuilt and then renamed after Coal Canyon's original founder, Gustaf (Gus) Lindberg. The post office remained in operation until either 1923 or 1925. Lindberg had a peak population of approximately 200 in the 1920s.

Due to financial difficulties, Lindberg lost his property in the mid 1920s, but the camp continued under the name of Millberg but remained known under the Lindberg moniker, via the Lindberg & Hoby Logging Camp, into the 1940s.

Many homes in Lindberg were made of brick, a rarity in the usual mill towns of the era. The area shows few signs of the logging operation, but both sides of the road through this section are dotted with houses and businesses, all of which bear a Morton address, though they are outside the limits of the town proper.

== Geography ==
Lindberg was located approximately 5 miles (8.0 km) west of Morton. By 1928, there were two train stops bracketing Lindberg, East Fork (formerly Glenavon) to the north and Coal Canyon to the south. In the 21st century, Lindberg is considered a neighborhood located on State Route 7.

The GNIS lists location as unknown, however period maps (1920-1930 census districts) show Lindberg on State Route 7, about three miles north of the U.S. Route 12 junction, where the East Fork Tilton River joins Tilton River.
