= Canyon, Washington =

Ghost town in Washington (state)

- Ghost town
- Location within Washington (state) Location within the United States
- Coordinates: 46°37′53″N 118°03′11″W
- Country: United States
- State: Washington
- County: Whitman
- Established: 1905
- Time zone: UTC-8 (Pacific (PST))
  - Summer (DST): UTC-7 (PDT)

Canyon is an extinct town in Whitman County, in the U.S. state of Washington.

A post office called Canyon was established in 1905, and remained in operation until 1918. The community was named for a canyon near the town site.
