= Gilmer, Washington =

Ghost town in Washington (state)

- Ghost town
- Location within Washington (state) Location within the United States
- Coordinates: 45°52′16″N 121°27′55″W
- Country: United States
- State: Washington
- County: Klickitat
- Established: 1883
- Time zone: UTC-8 (Pacific (PST))
  - Summer (DST): UTC-7 (PDT)

Gilmer is a former settlement in Klickitat County, in the U.S. state of Washington. It is named for George W. Gilmer, an early settler and postmaster. A ranch where horses and cattle were raised, Gilmer was an important staging point for goods being shipped over land from the Columbia River to the towns and mines in the central part of Klickitat County. In addition to the ranch, Gilmer had a post office and school for a time in the late nineteenth century. Travelers and settlers were frequently boarded at the Gilmer ranch while en route to their destinations.

A post office called Gilmer was established in 1883, and remained in operation until 1919.

== See also ==
- List of ghost towns in Washington
