= Interior, Washington =

Ghost town in Washington (state)

- Ghost town
- Location within Washington (state) Location within the United States
- Coordinates: 46°38′51″N 117°22′53″W
- Country: United States
- State: Washington
- County: Whitman
- Time zone: UTC-8 (Pacific (PST))
  - Summer (DST): UTC-7 (PDT)

Interior is an extinct town in Whitman County, in the U.S. state of Washington.

The community took its name from the Interior Warehouse Company.
