= Brooklyn, Washington =

Unincorporated community in Washington, United States

Brooklyn
- Unincorporated community
- Location within the state of Washington
- Coordinates: 46°46′34″N 123°30′35″W
- Country: United States
- State: Washington
- County: Pacific
- Elevation: 177 ft (54 m)
- Time zone: UTC-8 (Pacific (PST))
  - Summer (DST): UTC-7 (PDT)
- GNIS feature ID: 1510840

Brooklyn is an isolated unincorporated community in Pacific County, Washington. It is located roughly 30 miles away from Raymond, the nearest incorporated community, and 18 miles off of US 101. The only business is a tavern called the Brooklyn Tavern.
