= Bolster, Washington =

Ghost town in Washington (state)

- Ghost town
- Location within Washington (state) Location within the United States
- Coordinates: 48°58′21″N 119°02′20″W
- Country: United States
- State: Washington
- County: Okanogan
- Platted: 1899
- Time zone: UTC-8 (Pacific (PST))
  - Summer (DST): UTC-7 (PDT)

Bolster is a ghost town in Okanogan County, Washington, USA. In 1899, the town was plotted by J.S. McBride, who named it for the Spokane financier Herman Bolster. He sold lots in the new town and at one time there were several stores, a post office and three saloons. The small town of some thirty families traded with Chesaw, each calling the other a 'suburb'. The town's newspaper, The Bolster Drill, could not make any money, and eventually went out of business. In 1909, the post office closed. There was a school in Bolster in 1910, but it was open for only that year.
