= Moore, Washington =

Ghost town in Washington (state)

- Ghost town
- Location within Washington (state) Location within the United States
- Coordinates: 48°14′06″N 120°36′57″W
- Country: United States
- State: Washington
- County: Chelan
- Time zone: UTC-8 (Pacific (PST))
  - Summer (DST): UTC-7 (PDT)

Moore is a ghost town in Chelan County, in the U.S. state of Washington. The GNIS classifies it as a populated place.

A post office called Moore was in operation from 1892 until 1955. J. Robert Moore, an early postmaster, gave the community his name.
