= Bishop, Washington =

Ghost town in Washington (state)

- Ghost town
- Location within Washington (state) Location within the United States
- Coordinates: 46°34′33″N 117°17′20″W
- Country: United States
- State: Washington
- County: Whitman
- Established: 1913
- Time zone: UTC-8 (Pacific (PST))
  - Summer (DST): UTC-7 (PDT)

Bishop is an extinct town in Whitman County, in the U.S. state of Washington.

A post office called Bishop was established in 1913, and remained in operation until 1925. The community was named after the Bishop brothers, local settlers.
