= Wilcox, Washington =

Ghost town in Washington (state)

- Ghost town
- Location within Washington (state) Location within the United States
- Coordinates: 46°48′36″N 117°29′26″W
- Country: United States
- State: Washington
- County: Whitman
- Established: 1892
- Time zone: UTC-8 (Pacific (PST))
  - Summer (DST): UTC-7 (PDT)

Wilcox is a ghost town in Whitman County, in the U.S. state of Washington. The GNIS classifies it as a populated place.

A post office called Wilcox was established in 1892, and remained in operation until 1935. Robert Wilcox, an early postmaster, gave the community its name.
