= Govan, Washington =

Unincorporated community and ghost town in Washington, United States

- Unincorporated community and Ghost town
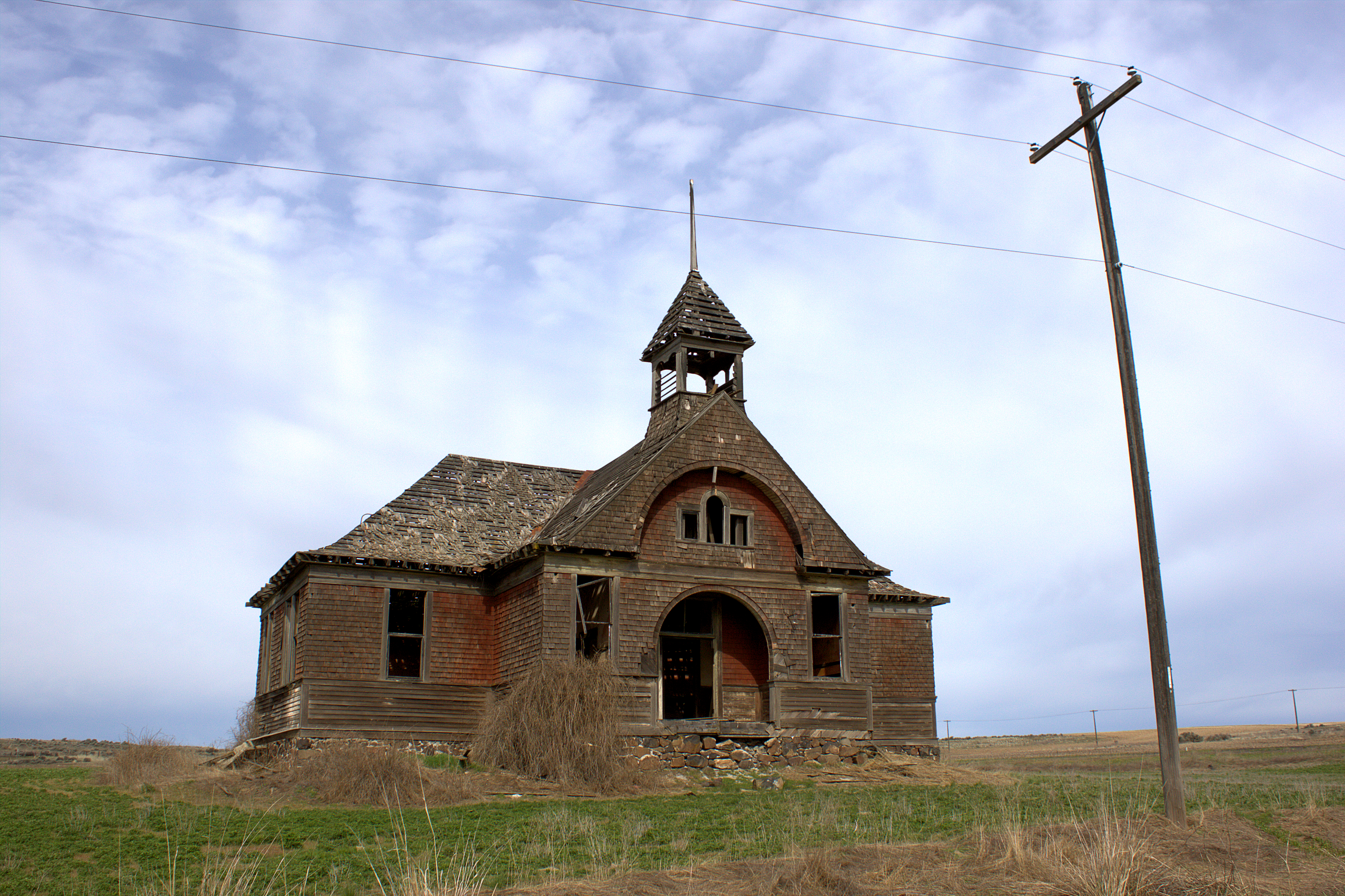
- Govan Schoolhouse in 2011

- Location within Washington (state)
- Coordinates: 47°44′20″N 118°49′23″W
- Country: United States
- State: Washington
- County: Lincoln
- Elevation: 2,100 ft (640 m)
- Time zone: UTC-8 (Pacific (PST))
  - Summer (DST): UTC-7 (PDT)
- ZIP code: 99185
- Area code: 509
- GNIS feature ID: 1511003

Govan is an unincorporated community in Lincoln County, in US state of Washington. An abandoned schoolhouse, post office and grain elevator, along with a few houses, both deserted and occupied, are all that remains of the town. It is considered to be a ghost town.

== History ==
The schoolhouse in Govan was built in 1905 and shut down in the 1940s. The steeple on the building toppled over in 2019. Two fires came through Govan, the most recent in 1974, that ultimately led to the town's abandonment. As of 2019, the area's population totaled three people.

Multiple unsolved murders took place in Govan before it was abandoned. In December 1902, Judge J.A. Lewis and his wife were murdered with an axe at their home in Govan. As the couple were quite wealthy, robbery was considered to be the motive. It was referred to at the time as "one of the most atrocious murders in the history of the state". In 1941 a woman was found murdered on her farm in Govan around the same time that her son went missing. The son's body was found in nearby fields eight years later.

== Gallery ==
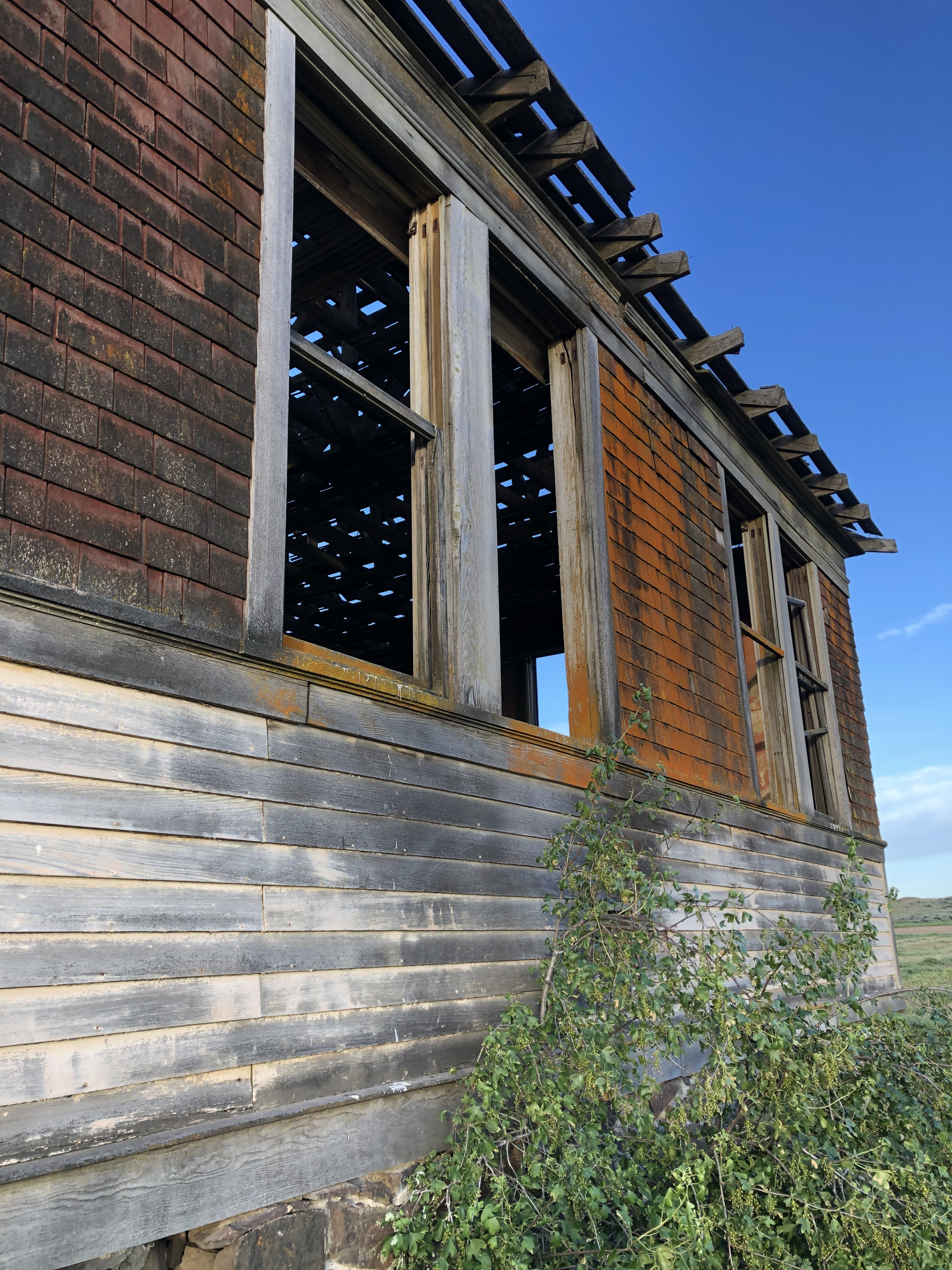
Side of abandoned 1906 schoolhouse in Govan

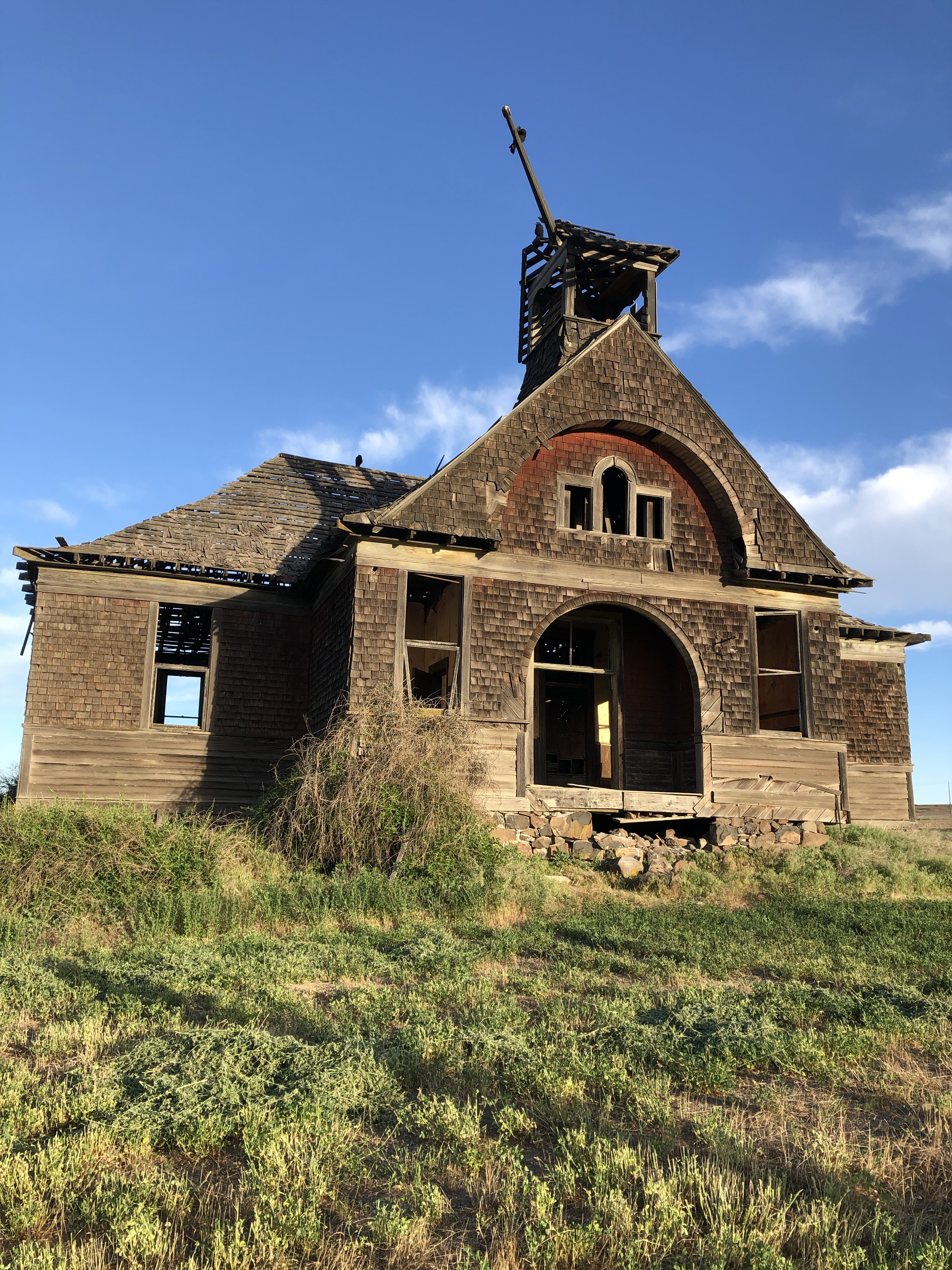
Abandoned 1906 schoolhouse in Govan in 2019

== See also ==
- List of ghost towns in Washington
