= Bonita, Washington =

Ghost town in Washington (state)

- Ghost town
- Location within Washington (state) Location within the United States
- Coordinates: 47°58′48″N 119°52′04″W
- Country: United States
- State: Washington
- County: Douglas
- Established: 1903
- Time zone: UTC-8 (Pacific (PST))
  - Summer (DST): UTC-7 (PDT)

Bonita is an extinct town in Douglas County, in the U.S. state of Washington.

A post office called Bonita was established in 1903, and remained in operation until 1927. The community was named after a place in the Philippines, according to local history.
