= Monohon, Washington =

Ghost town in Washington (state)

- Ghost town
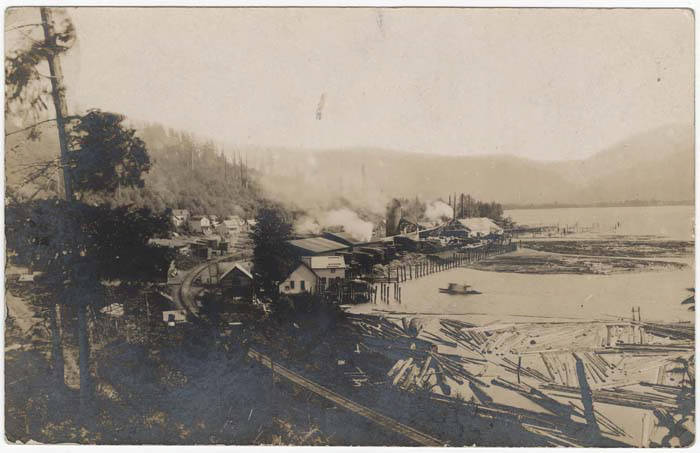
- Monohon and its sawmill, circa 1910

- Location within Washington (state) Location within the United States
- Coordinates: 47°34′47″N 122°04′29″W
- Country: United States
- State: Washington
- County: King
- Time zone: UTC-8 (Pacific (PST))
  - Summer (DST): UTC-7 (PDT)

Monohon was a town located on the east side of Lake Sammamish (then known as Lake Squak), near the present-day intersection of East Lake Sammamish Parkway and SE 33rd Street in the city of Sammamish. The community was originally part of a town named Donnelly, founded by Simon Donelly who built a sawmill there, but then grew big enough and was far enough away from Donelly that residents created a separate town, Monohon, in 1888. The new town was named after Martin Monohon who had homesteaded 160 acres (0.65 km^{2}) there in 1877. The railroad along the east side of the lake was completed in 1889, and the Donnelly mill was moved to the site of Monohon.

By 1900, there were twenty homes in Monohon, and the lumber mill was updated with the latest machinery. The mill also completed a new water system for the community. This brought both new wealth and new settlers to the community, and by 1911, the town's population had reached over 300. A 20-room hotel was built overlooking the lake, along with a church and a community meeting hall. The dock was used to ship lumber and dairy products on the lake.

During the height of the prohibition era, the town was raided by King County Sheriff officers looking for bootleggers. 50 gallons of moonshine whiskey were reportedly confiscated.

In 1925, the town was largely destroyed by a fire, with only about 10 homes surviving. The mill was rebuilt, but the town never recovered, and all but disappeared when the Great Depression hit in 1929. The sawmill continued to operate for many years after, but was repeatedly burned and rebuilt. The mill finally closed permanently in 1980.

== See also ==
- List of ghost towns in Washington
