= Knappton, Washington =

Ghost town in Washington (state)

- Ghost town
- Location within Washington (state) Location within the United States
- Coordinates: 46°16′35″N 123°48′54″W
- Country: United States
- State: Washington
- County: Pacific
- Established: 1871
- Time zone: UTC-8 (Pacific (PST))
  - Summer (DST): UTC-7 (PDT)

Knappton is a ghost town in Pacific County, in the U.S. state of Washington. The GNIS classifies it as a populated place. It is located not far from the mouth of the Columbia, a few miles east of the Astoria-Megler Bridge.

A post office called Knappton was established in 1871, and remained in operation until 1943. The community was named after J. B. Knapp, the proprietor of a local sawmill.
