= Ehrlich, Washington =

Ghost town in Washington (state)

- Ghost town
- Location within Washington (state) Location within the United States
- Coordinates: 48°21′14″N 122°14′00″W
- Country: United States
- State: Washington
- County: Skagit
- Established: 1896
- Time zone: UTC-8 (Pacific (PST))
  - Summer (DST): UTC-7 (PDT)

Ehrlich is an extinct town in Skagit County, in the U.S. state of Washington. The settlement and accompanying rail station were originally named Theiler's Spur. The community was renamed Ehrlich around 1900 after F. O. Ehrlich established a shingle mill in the area.

Ehrlich was built on land originally homesteaded by Joseph and Anna Theiler in 1886. Early settlers included Albert Fisher, who came in 1897, the Weppler family in 1895, and the family of Charles McInnes in 1901.

A school was established along the west bank of Lake Creek in 1902. That school is now a private residence on Triple Creek Lane.

A post office called Ehrlich was established in 1896, and remained in operation until 1915.
