= Mottinger, Washington =

Ghost town in Washington (state)

- Ghost town
- Location within Washington (state) Location within the United States
- Coordinates: 45°56′15″N 119°09′04″W
- Country: United States
- State: Washington
- County: Benton
- Established: 1908
- Time zone: UTC-8 (Pacific (PST))
  - Summer (DST): UTC-7 (PDT)

Mottinger is an extinct town in Benton County, in the U.S. state of Washington.

A post office called Mottinger was established in 1908, and remained in operation until 1951. The community was named after G. H. and Martha Mottinger, early settlers.
