= Pacific County, Washington =

County in Washington, United States

- County
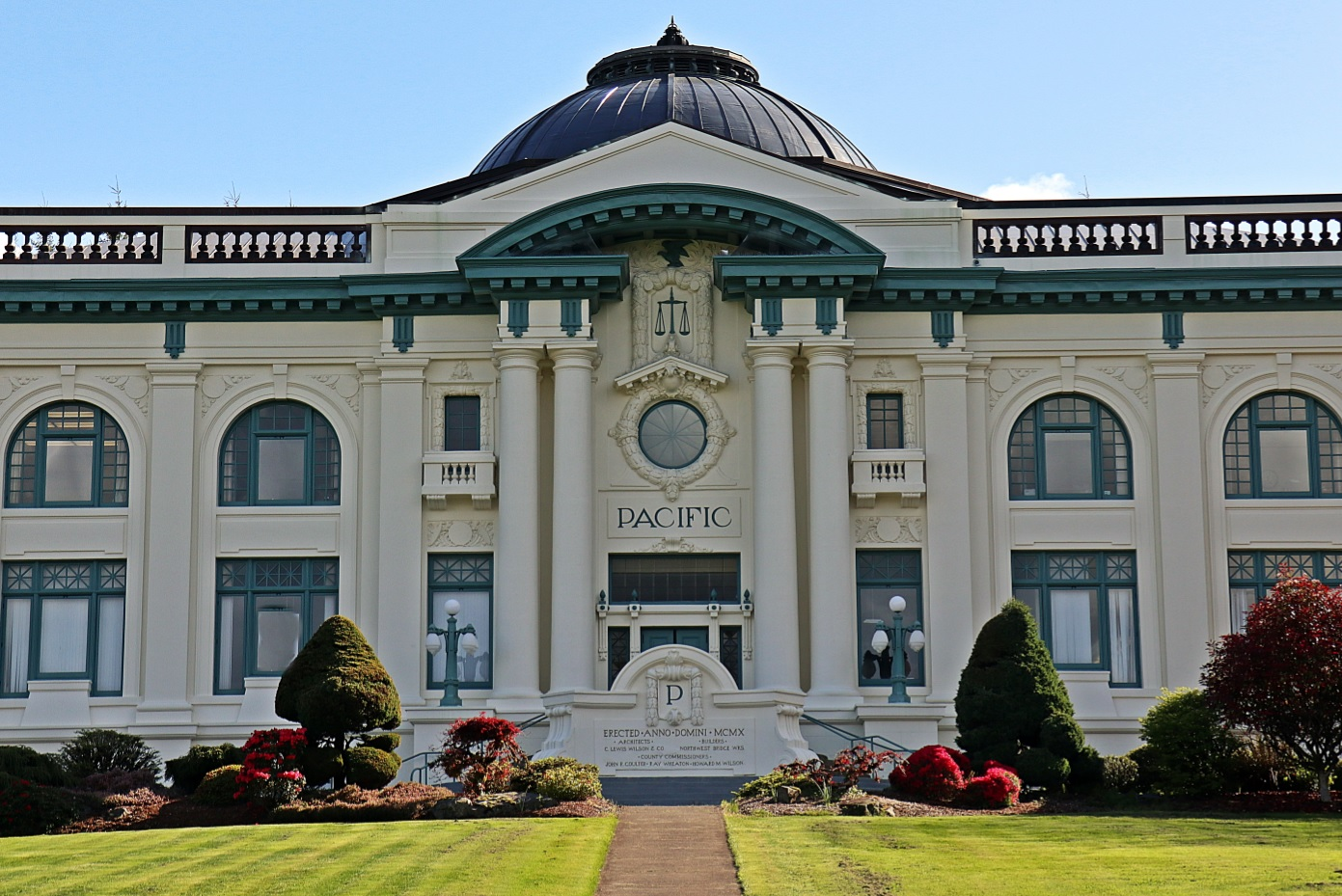
- Pacific County Courthouse, South Bend

- Location within the U.S. state of Washington
- Coordinates: 46°34′N 123°47′W
- Country: United States
- State: Washington
- Founded: February 4, 1851
- Named for: Pacific Ocean
- Seat: South Bend
- Largest city: Raymond

Area
  - Total: 1,223 sq mi (3,170 km^{2})
  - Land: 933 sq mi (2,420 km^{2})
  - Water: 291 sq mi (750 km^{2}) 24%

Population (2020)
  - Total: 23,365
  - Estimate (2025): 24,357 ▲
  - Density: 19/sq mi (7.3/km^{2})
- Time zone: UTC−8 (Pacific)
  - Summer (DST): UTC−7 (PDT)
- Congressional district: 3rd
- Website: www.co.pacific.wa.us

Pacific County is a county in the U.S. state of Washington. As of the 2020 census, the population was 23,365. Its county seat is South Bend, and its largest city is Raymond. The county was formed by the government of Oregon Territory in February 1851 and is named for the Pacific Ocean.

Pacific County is centered on Willapa Bay, a region that provides twenty-five percent of the United States oyster harvest, although forestry, fishing, and tourism are also significant elements of the county's economy.

== History ==
The area that is now Pacific County was part of Oregon Territory in the first part of the nineteenth century. On December 19, 1845, the Provisional Government of Oregon created two counties (Vancouver and Clark) in its northern portion (which is now the state of Washington). In 1849, the name of Vancouver County was changed to Lewis County, and on February 4, 1851, a portion of Lewis County was partitioned off to become Pacific County. The county's boundaries have not changed since its creation. Pacific City was the first county seat, when it was annexed by the US military, the county seat was transferred to Chinookville. The unincorporated community of Oysterville, established in 1852, was the third county seat. The county records were stolen from Oysterville and ferried across Willapa Harbor by residents of South Bend, resulting in that town becoming the new county seat in 1893.

== Geography ==
According to the United States Census Bureau, the county has an area of 1,223 square miles (3,170 km^{2}), of which 933 square miles (2,420 km^{2}) is land and 291 square miles (750 km^{2}) (24%) is water.

=== Geographic features ===
- Cape Disappointment
- Columbia River
- Long Beach Peninsula
- Long Island
- Willapa Bay

=== Major highways ===
- U.S. Route 101
- State Route 6

=== Adjacent counties ===
- Grays Harbor County – north
- Lewis County – east
- Wahkiakum County – southeast
- Clatsop County, Oregon – south

=== National protected areas ===
- Lewis and Clark National Historical Park (part)
- Willapa National Wildlife Refuge

== Demographics ==
Historical population
Census	Pop.	Note	%±
1860	420		—
1870	738		75.7%
1880	1,645		122.9%
1890	4,358		164.9%
1900	5,983		37.3%
1910	12,532		109.5%
1920	14,891		18.8%
1930	14,970		0.5%
1940	15,928		6.4%
1950	16,558		4.0%
1960	14,674		−11.4%
1970	15,796		7.6%
1980	17,237		9.1%
1990	18,882		9.5%
2000	20,984		11.1%
2010	20,920		−0.3%
2020	23,365		11.7%
2025 (est.)	24,357	▲	4.2%
U.S. Decennial Census; 1790–1960 1900–1990; 1990–2000 2010–2020

=== 2020 census ===
As of the 2020 census, the county had a population of 23,365. Of the residents, 17.1% were under the age of 18 and 31.5% were 65 years of age or older; the median age was 53.8 years. For every 100 females there were 99.4 males, and for every 100 females age 18 and over there were 97.6 males. 37.1% of residents lived in urban areas and 62.9% lived in rural areas.

Pacific County, Washington – Racial and ethnic composition Note: the US Census treats Hispanic/Latino as an ethnic category. This table excludes Latinos from the racial categories and assigns them to a separate category. Hispanics/Latinos may be of any race.
Race / Ethnicity (NH = Non-Hispanic)	Pop 2000	Pop 2010	Pop 2020	% 2000	% 2010	% 2020
White alone (NH)	18,462	17,699	18,609	87.98%	84.60%	79.64%
Black or African American alone (NH)	36	67	100	0.17%	0.32%	0.43%
Native American or Alaska Native alone (NH)	467	427	501	2.23%	2.04%	2.14%
Asian alone (NH)	435	424	461	2.07%	2.03%	1.97%
Pacific Islander alone (NH)	16	14	39	0.08%	0.07%	0.17%
Other race alone (NH)	13	13	119	0.06%	0.06%	0.51%
Mixed race or Multiracial (NH)	503	599	1,340	2.40%	2.86%	5.73%
Hispanic or Latino (any race)	1,052	1,677	2,196	5.01%	8.02%	9.40%
Total	20,984	20,920	23,365	100.00%	100.00%	100.00%

The racial makeup of the county was 81.8% White, 0.4% Black or African American, 2.4% American Indian and Alaska Native, 2.0% Asian, 4.9% from some other race, and 8.4% from two or more races. Hispanic or Latino residents of any race comprised 9.4% of the population.

There were 10,514 households in the county, of which 20.2% had children under the age of 18 living with them and 26.0% had a female householder with no spouse or partner present. About 33.0% of all households were made up of individuals and 18.6% had someone living alone who was 65 years of age or older.

There were 16,034 housing units, of which 34.4% were vacant. Among occupied housing units, 75.3% were owner-occupied and 24.7% were renter-occupied. The homeowner vacancy rate was 2.0% and the rental vacancy rate was 6.3%.

=== 2010 census ===
As of the 2010 census, there were 20,920 people, 9,499 households, and 5,707 families living in the county. The population density was 22.4 inhabitants per square mile (8.6/km^{2}). There were 15,547 housing units at an average density of 16.7 per square mile (6.4/km^{2}). The racial makeup of the county was 87.4% white, 2.3% American Indian, 2.0% Asian, 0.4% black or African American, 0.1% Pacific islander, 4.4% from other races, and 3.4% from two or more races. Those of Hispanic or Latino origin made up 8.0% of the population. In terms of ancestry, 23.4% were German, 13.8% were English, 11.9% were Irish, 7.6% were American, 6.2% were Norwegian, and 5.8% were Swedish.

Of the 9,499 households, 20.7% had children under the age of 18 living with them, 47.6% were married couples living together, 8.1% had a female householder with no husband present, 39.9% were non-families, and 33.0% of all households were made up of individuals. The average household size was 2.17 and the average family size was 2.72. The median age was 50.8 years.

The median income for a household in the county was $39,642 and the median income for a family was $51,450. Males had a median income of $44,775 versus $34,538 for females. The per capita income for the county was $23,326. About 12.4% of families and 16.8% of the population were below the poverty line, including 20.4% of those under age 18 and 9.9% of those age 65 or over.

=== 2000 census ===
As of the 2000 census, there were 20,984 people, 9,096 households, and 5,885 families living in the county. The population density was 22 people per square mile (8.5 people/km^{2}). There were 13,991 housing units at an average density of 15 per square mile (5.8/km^{2}). The racial makeup of the county was 90.54% White, 0.20% Black or African American, 2.44% Native American, 2.08% Asian, 0.09% Pacific Islander, 1.83% from other races, and 2.82% from two or more races. 5.01% of the population were Hispanic or Latino of any race. 18.0% were of German, 10.8% English, 8.8% Irish and 8.6% United States or American ancestry.

There were 9,096 households, out of which 23.10% had children under the age of 18 living with them, 53.10% were married couples living together, 7.90% had a female householder with no husband present, and 35.30% were non-families. 29.50% of all households were made up of individuals, and 14.30% had someone living alone who was 65 years of age or older. The average household size was 2.27 and the average family size was 2.77.

In the county, the population was spread out, with 21.40% under the age of 18, 6.00% from 18 to 24, 21.20% from 25 to 44, 28.90% from 45 to 64, and 22.60% who were 65 years of age or older. The median age was 46 years. For every 100 females there were 98.30 males. For every 100 females age 18 and over, there were 95.80 males.

The median income for a household in the county was $31,209, and the median income for a family was $39,302. Males had a median income of $33,892 versus $22,982 for females. The per capita income for the county was $17,322. About 9.10% of families and 14.40% of the population were below the poverty line, including 19.70% of those under age 18 and 8.10% of those age 65 or over.

== Politics ==
Pacific County, along with neighboring Grays Harbor County, were among the most consistently Democratic counties in the nation. In 2016, however, the county, like Grays Harbor County, broke its long streak of backing the Democratic candidate for president, voting for the Republican candidate, Donald Trump. The county backed Trump again in 2020, voting for a losing Republican for the first time since 1916. It backed Trump again in 2024, with him winning it by a margin of 1.30%, a slight increase from his margin of 1.13% in 2020.

United States presidential election results for Pacific County, Washington
Year	Republican		Democratic		Third party(ies)	
Year	No.	%	No.	%	No.	%
1892	759	52.60%	559	38.74%	125	8.66%
1896	925	61.22%	562	37.19%	24	1.59%
1900	887	66.74%	393	29.57%	49	3.69%
1904	1,354	76.98%	258	14.67%	147	8.36%
1908	1,492	69.30%	483	22.43%	178	8.27%
1912	1,375	33.77%	971	23.85%	1,726	42.39%
1916	2,688	59.50%	1,537	34.02%	293	6.49%
1920	2,607	65.57%	874	21.98%	495	12.45%
1924	2,672	64.57%	501	12.11%	965	23.32%
1928	3,247	67.41%	1,523	31.62%	47	0.98%
1932	1,737	31.08%	3,099	55.46%	752	13.46%
1936	1,732	26.87%	4,395	68.17%	320	4.96%
1940	2,704	37.84%	4,393	61.48%	48	0.67%
1944	2,419	39.17%	3,745	60.64%	12	0.19%
1948	2,749	38.98%	3,902	55.33%	401	5.69%
1952	3,846	50.19%	3,778	49.30%	39	0.51%
1956	3,799	49.76%	3,824	50.09%	12	0.16%
1960	3,224	45.47%	3,837	54.12%	29	0.41%
1964	1,789	26.08%	5,056	73.70%	15	0.22%
1968	2,491	37.71%	3,740	56.62%	374	5.66%
1972	3,349	46.73%	3,585	50.03%	232	3.24%
1976	2,781	37.84%	4,278	58.20%	291	3.96%
1980	3,132	39.09%	3,727	46.52%	1,153	14.39%
1984	3,613	42.90%	4,679	55.56%	129	1.53%
1988	3,073	37.48%	5,017	61.18%	110	1.34%
1992	2,243	24.24%	4,587	49.58%	2,422	26.18%
1996	2,598	28.51%	5,095	55.92%	1,418	15.56%
2000	4,042	42.46%	4,895	51.42%	582	6.11%
2004	4,634	44.43%	5,570	53.40%	227	2.18%
2008	4,555	41.65%	6,094	55.72%	288	2.63%
2012	4,499	42.75%	5,711	54.27%	314	2.98%
2016	5,360	48.85%	4,620	42.11%	992	9.04%
2020	6,953	49.44%	6,794	48.31%	317	2.25%
2024	7,010	49.21%	6,825	47.91%	409	2.87%

== Communities ==
=== Cities ===
- Ilwaco
- Long Beach
- Raymond
- South Bend (county seat)

=== Census-designated places ===
- Bay Center
- Chinook
- Lebam
- Naselle
- Ocean Park
- Tokeland
- Willapa

=== Unincorporated communities ===
- Dexter by the Sea
- Firdale
- Frances
- Holcomb
- Megler
- Menlo
- Nemah
- North Cove
- Oceanside
- Old Willapa
- Oysterville
- Seaview
- Surfside
- Brooklyn

=== Ghost towns ===
- Bruceport
- Chetlo Harbor
- Frankfort
- Knappton
- McGowan
- Pacific City
- Pluvius
- Seahaven

== See also ==
- Ilwaco Railway and Navigation Company
- National Register of Historic Places listings in Pacific County, Washington
- Steamboats of Willapa Bay
- Astoria-Megler Ferry
