= Barron, Washington =

Ghost town in Washington (State)

- Ghost town
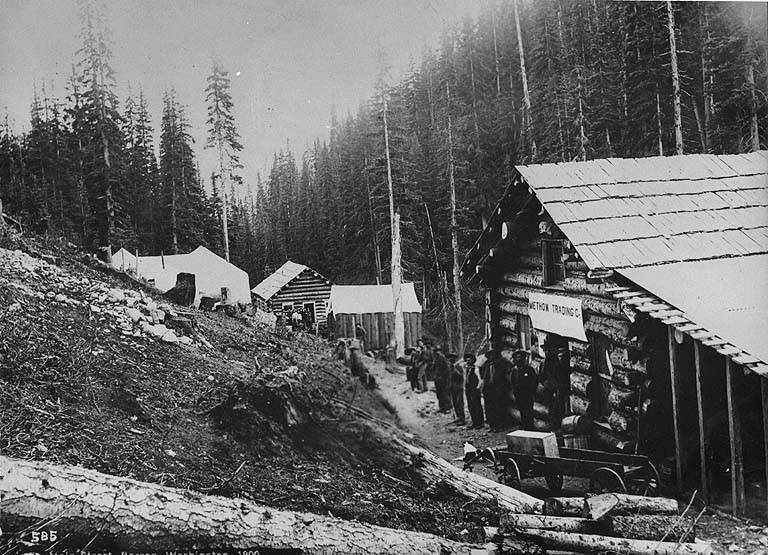
- Main street, 1900

- Location within Washington (state)
- Coordinates: 48°45′11.49″N 120°42′59.39″W
- Country: United States
- State: Washington
- County: Whatcom
- Named for: Alex M. Barron
- Elevation: 5,220 ft (1,590 m)
- Time zone: UTC-8 (Pacific (PST))
  - Summer (DST): UTC-7 (PDT)
- ZIP Code: 98862
- GNIS feature ID: 1516166

Barron is a ghost town in Whatcom County, Washington, United States. It was a boomtown that was established during the Skagit River gold rush in the late 19th century to serve miners near Slate Peak along Slate Creek in eastern Whatcom County. It was abandoned shortly after it was built and retains most of its heavy equipment and buildings.

== History ==
Gold prospectors were in the area as early as the 1870s, establishing several camps well into the 1880s.

In 1891, Alex M. Barron, a prospector from Anacortes, struck gold on Slate Creek and discovered the Eureka Lode; by 1894 the town of Barron had a population of over 1,000 residents. A 400-pound (180 kg) piece of gold-bearing quartz from the Barron mines was displayed at the 1893 Chicago World's Fair.

A trail was built from the east, in Okanogan County, through Hart's Pass. The trail was improved into a road by the National Forest Service in 1935. A trail following the Skagit River from the west had existed but was notoriously difficult and dangerous at the time, so most effort was spent building the trail from the east.

At its peak, sometime between 1897 and 1899, the town had a population of 2,500. Barron had many amenities despite its remote location, including hotels, saloons, a post office, a school, and a power plant. The post office was established on December 20, 1899, with Milton S. Storey as its first postmaster. The rush lasted two years until many miners left for the Klondike Gold Rush in 1899, but by that point $120,000 worth of gold (Note: This amount reflects when gold was $16 an ounce. As of December 14, 2025 gold is worth $4,300 an ounce (rounded down), which would make the total $32,250,000.) had been mined according to a Forest Service mining engineer.

By 1899, a 10 stamp mill had been established, and in 1900 rights to the nearby Eureka Lode were sold to California businessman Charles D. Lane for $80,000. (Note: $3,100,000 in 2025) In 1904, it was reported to be averaging $20,000 a month, (Note: $717,000 in 2025) but by 1907 the town was abandoned, and on January 15, 1910, the post office was closed.

== See also ==
- List of ghost towns in Washington
