= Kerriston, Washington =

Ghost town in Washington (state)

- Ghost town
- Location within Washington (state) Location within the United States
- Coordinates: 47°27′17″N 121°51′27″W
- Country: United States
- State: Washington
- County: King
- Established: 1904
- Time zone: UTC-8 (Pacific (PST))
  - Summer (DST): UTC-7 (PDT)

Kerriston is an extinct town in King County, in the U.S. state of Washington. The GNIS classifies it as a populated place.

A post office called Kerriston was established in 1904, and remained in operation until 1935. The community most likely derived its name from the local Kerry Mill Company.
