= Pleasant View, Washington =

Ghost town in Washington (state)

- Ghost town
- Location within Washington (state) Location within the United States
- Coordinates: 46°29′27″N 118°20′22″W
- Country: United States
- State: Washington
- County: Walla Walla
- Platted: 1894
- Time zone: UTC-8 (Pacific (PST))
  - Summer (DST): UTC-7 (PDT)

Pleasant View is an extinct town in Walla Walla County, in the U.S. state of Washington.

Pleasant View was laid out in 1894.
