= Wannacut Lake =

Lake in Okanogan County, Washington, USA

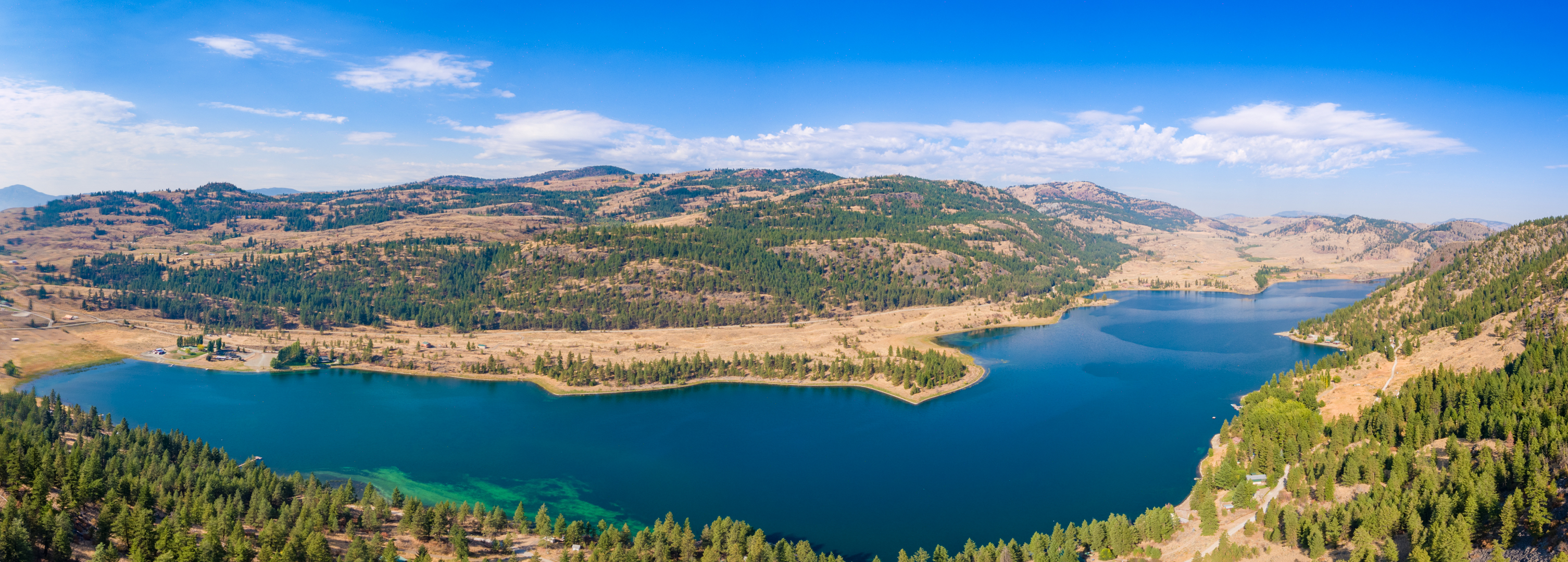
- A drone shot aerial panorama of Wannacut Lake

- Location within Washington (state) Location within the United States
- Location: Okanogan County, Washington, United States
- Coordinates: 48°53′2″N 119°31′8″W
- Basin countries: United States
- Surface elevation: 1,857 ft (566 m)

Wannacut Lake is a lake in the U.S. state of Washington.

Wannacut Lake most likely derives its name from surveyor George Wanicut.

== See also ==
- List of lakes in Washington
