= Sauk City, Washington =

Ghost town in Washington (state)

- Ghost town
- Location within Washington (state) Location within the United States
- Coordinates: 48°28′29″N 121°37′35″W
- Country: United States
- State: Washington
- County: Skagit
- Founded: 1880s
- Elevation: 236 ft (72 m)
- Time zone: UTC-8 (Pacific (PST))
  - Summer (DST): UTC-7 (PDT)
- Area code(s): 360, 564
- GNIS feature ID: 1529902

Sauk City, also known as Sauk, is a former unincorporated community in Skagit County, Washington. It was located along the Skagit River at its confluence with the Sauk River, west of the modern settlement of Rockport.

The community was founded in the 1880s as a transfer point between steamboats and a wagon road leading to the Monte Cristo mines during a gold rush. The town initially grew along the south bank of the Skagit River until a major flood in 1897 destroyed the settlement. A second town was built on the north side of the river near the site of the Great Northern Railway, which was completed in 1901 after another fire. The new Sauk City was destroyed by a second fire and it was abandoned as the area's mining and lumber fortunes dwindled in the early 20th century.

During the early growth of the town, Sauk City was proposed as the county seat of the new Skagit County in 1891, but lost out to Mount Vernon.

== See also ==
- List of ghost towns in Washington
