= Keystone, Adams County, Washington =

Ghost town in Washington (state)

Keystone
- Ghost town
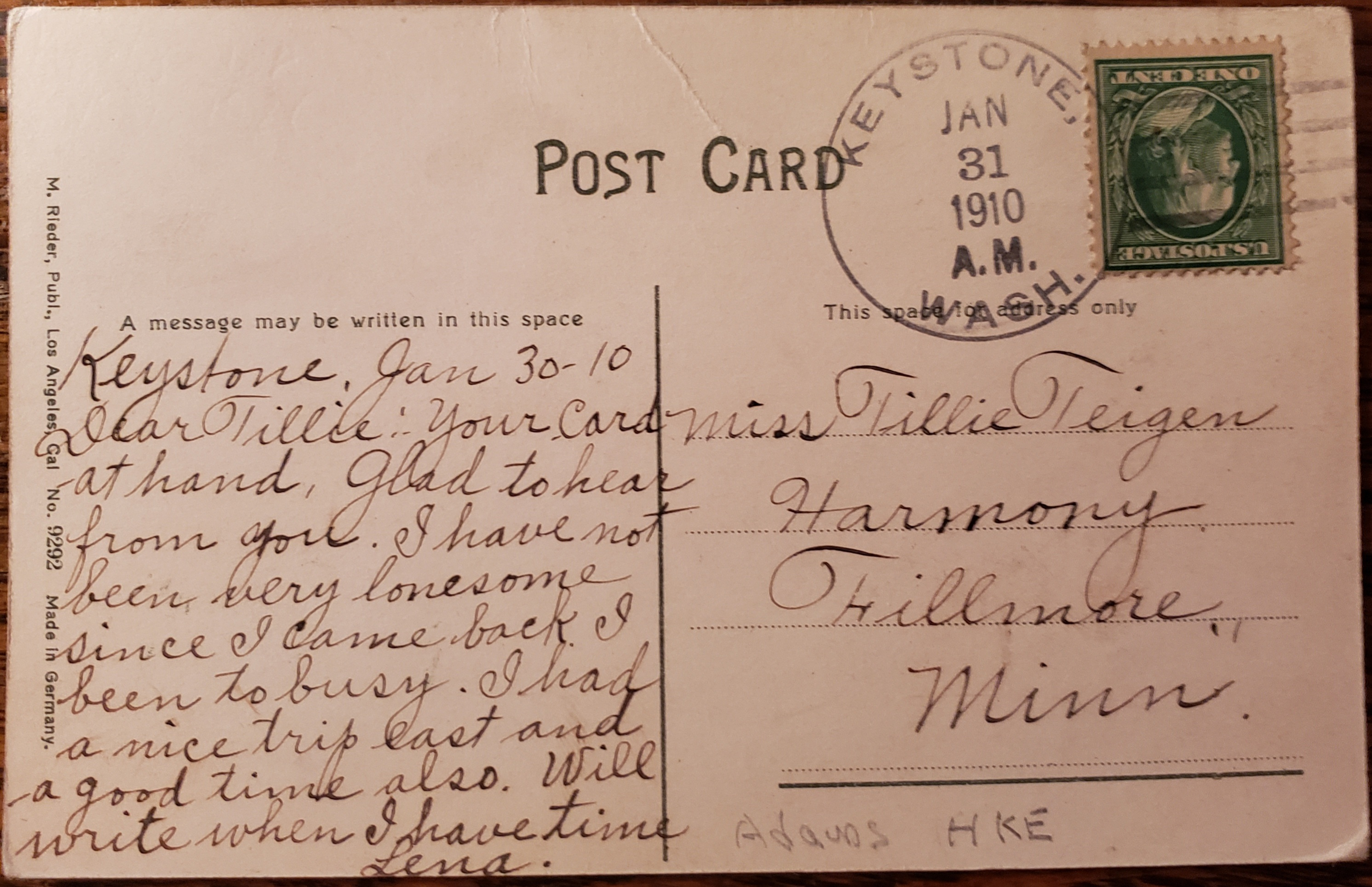
- Postmark from Keystone Postoffice 1910

- Location within Washington (state)
- Coordinates: 47°14′25.63″N 118°9′10.72″W
- Country: United States
- State: Washington
- Founded: ca. 1885
- Elevation: 1,936 ft (590 m)
- Time zone: UTC-8 (PST)
  - Summer (DST): UTC-7 (PDT)
- GNIS feature ID: 1511519

Keystone was a town in Adams County, Washington. It is located on the Northern Pacific Railroad, 16 miles NE of Ritzville and 10 miles SW of Sprague (east part of Section 9, T20N, R37E). The community was named after Pennsylvania, the Keystone State, the former home of an early postmaster.

Keystone was on the site of the Harriston post office which was in operation from October 12, 1883 to September 22, 1884. It is believed that it had the name Keystone from as far back as 1880 as a report in the Walla Walla Union of July 17, 1880 named it as a new “railroad town”. The Gazateer of 1907 described it as a “Station named Harrison (sic)” with a population of 20 people. At that time Smith & Sons were the general merchants, the Carmichael Brothers also had a general store and a hotel, E.M. Robish dealt in lumber and fuel, and John W. Smith was a blacksmith, most likely being Keystone’s first postmaster. Keystone was a grain shipping point and in 1907 C.L. Fish, Kerr, Gifford and Company and Puget Sound Wholesale Company were grain dealers.

John W. Smith was born in 1856 in Beaver County, Penn. He learned the blacksmithing trade and set up his first shop in Elwood, IL. In 1883 he came west, first to Oregon and then to Rockford, Spokane County, where he erected the first brick block in that town. He was a delegate to the Constitutional Convention in 1889. He came to Keystone in 1901.

Postmasters for Keystone included John W. Smith (October 23, 1901, established), David W. Circle (March 25, 1905), Rolla T. Stone (August 21, 1909), and Myrtle S. VanBuren (August 2, 1912). Mail was discontinued on May 1, 1925; all mail was sent to Sprague in Lincoln County.

== See also ==
- List of ghost towns in Washington
