= List of unincorporated communities in Washington =

This is a list of unincorporated communities in the U.S. state of Washington which are not incorporated municipalities. Incorporated municipalities in the state are listed separately in a list of cities and list of towns. Due to unreliability of the source data in the Geographic Names Information System, items in this list may be historical places that no longer exist, places that are part of an incorporated city or town or a CDP, or never a community in the first place.

== Census-designated places ==
There are 345 unincorporated communities that are treated as "places" for the purpose of U.S. Census Bureau data collection. These are termed census-designated places (CDPs) and are listed on a separate page.

== Unincorporated communities (including those that are CDPs) ==
| Community | County | Postal address |
|---|---|---|
| Addy | Stevens County | (Addy) |
| Adna | Lewis County | (Adna) |
| Aeneas | Okanogan County | Tonasket |
| Agate | Mason County | |
| Agnew | Clallam County | Port Angeles |
| Ajlune | Lewis County | Mossyrock |
| Alder | Pierce County | Eatonville |
| Alderdale | Klickitat County | |
| Alderton | Pierce County | Puyallup |
| Alderwood | Whatcom County | |
| Alfalfa | Yakima County | |
| Alger | Skagit County | |
| Allen | Skagit County | Bow |
| Allentown | King County | Tukwila |
| Allyn | Mason County | (Allyn) |
| Almota | Whitman County | |
| Alpha | Lewis County | Onalaska |
| Alta Vista | Lewis County | |
| Altoona | Wahkiakum County | |
| Amanda Park | Grays Harbor | (Amanda Park) |
| Ankeny | Adams County | |
| Appleton | Klickitat County | (Appleton) |
| Arcadia | Mason County | |
| Arden | Stevens County | |
| Ardenvoir | Chelan County | (Ardenvoir) |
| Argyle | San Juan County | |
| Ariel | Cowlitz County | (Ariel) |
| Artic | Grays Harbor County | |
| Arzina | Stevens County | |
| Attalia | Walla Walla County | |
| Avon | Skagit County | |
| Ayer | Walla Walla County | |
| Baileysburg | Columbia County | |
| Baird | Douglas County | Coulee City |
| Ballow | Mason County | |
| Barstow | Ferry County | |
| Bay City | Grays Harbor County | Aberdeen |
| Bayne | King County | |
| Bayview | Island County | |
| Bay View | Skagit County | |
| Beaver | Clallam County | (Beaver) |
| Beebe | Douglas County | Chelan |
| Belfair | Mason County | (Belfair) |
| Belmont | Whitman County | (Belmont) |
| Benge | Adams County | (Benge) |
| Berrydale | King County | |
| Berryman | Walla Walla County | |
| Birdsview | Skagit County | |
| Blakely Island | San Juan County | (Blakely Island) |
| Blewett | Chelan County | Leavenworth |
| Blockhouse | Klickitat County | |
| Blueslide | Pend Oreille County | |
| Bodie | Okanogan County | Wauconda |
| Boistfort | Lewis County | Chehalis |
| Bolster | Okanogan County | |
| Bordeaux | Thurston County | |
| Bossburg | Stevens County | |
| Boston Harbor | Thurston County | Olympia |
| Boyds | Ferry County | (Boyds) |
| Breidablick | Kitsap County | Poulsbo |
| Bremer | Lewis County | |
| Brookfield | Wahkiakum County | |
| Brooklyn | Pacific County | |
| Brownstown | Yakima County | (Brownstown) |
| Bruceport | Pacific County | |
| Bryant | Snohomish County | Arlington |
| Bryn Mawr | King County | Seattle |
| Buckhorn | San Juan County | |
| Buckeye | Spokane County | |
| Buena | Yakima County | (Buena) |
| Bunker | Lewis County | Chehalis |
| Bunker Hill | Cowlitz County | |
| Burley | Kitsap County | (Burley) |
| Burnett | Pierce County | Buckley |
| Byron | Yakima County | |
| Camden | Pend Oreille County | |
| Canyon Creek | Snohomish County | Bothell |
| Carlisle | Grays Harbor County | Copalis |
| Carlsborg | Clallam County | Sequim |
| Carlton | Okanogan County | (Carlton) |
| Carrolls | Cowlitz County | (Carrolls) |
| Cascade | King County | Renton |
| Cascade Valley | Grant County | |
| Cedar Falls | King County | North Bend |
| Cedarhurst | King County | |
| Cedarville | Whatcom County | Oakville |
| Cedonia | Stevens County | Hunters |
| Chambers | Whitman County | |
| Chard | Garfield County | |
| Chattaroy | Spokane County | (Chattaroy) |
| Chelan Falls | Chelan County | |
| Chelatchie | Clark County | |
| Cherokee | Okanogan County | Omak |
| Chesaw | Okanogan County | |
| Chester | Spokane County | |
| Chimacum | Jefferson County | |
| Cinebar | Lewis County | |
| Clallam Bay | Clallam County | |
| Clarkston Heights | Asotin County | |
| Clayton | Stevens County | |
| Clearwater | Jefferson County | |
| Cleveland | Klickitat County | |
| Clipper | Whatcom County | |
| Cloverland | Asotin County | |
| Clyde | Walla Walla County | |
| Coal Creek | Cowlitz County | |
| Cokedale | Skagit County | |
| Colbert | Spokane County | |
| Cole's Corner | Chelan County | |
| Copalis Crossing | Grays Harbor County | |
| Corfu | Grant County | |
| Covada | Ferry County | |
| Cowiche | Yakima County | |
| Coyle | Jefferson County | |
| Crane | Clallam County | |
| Cromwell | Pierce County | |
| Crosby | Kitsap County | |
| Cumberland | King County | |
| Cunningham | Adams County | |
| Curlew | Ferry County | |
| Curtis | Lewis County | |
| Dabob | Jefferson County | |
| Dalkena | Pend Oreille County | |
| Danville | Ferry County | |
| Dartford | Spokane County | |
| Decatur | San Juan County | |
| Deep Creek | Spokane County | |
| Delphi | Thurston County | |
| Denison | Spokane County | |
| Dexter by the Sea | Pacific County | |
| Diablo | Whatcom County | |
| Diamond Lake | Pend Oreille County | |
| Disautel | Okanogan County | Omak |
| Discovery Bay | Jefferson County | |
| Dodge | Garfield County | |
| Doe Bay | San Juan County | |
| Donald | Yakima County | |
| Doty | Lewis County | |
| Douglas | Douglas County | |
| Dryden | Chelan County | |
| Dungeness | Clallam County | |
| Dynamite | Spokane County | |
| East Farms | Spokane County | |
| Eastsound | San Juan County | |
| Edwall | Lincoln County | |
| Eglon | Kitsap County | |
| Elberton | Whitman County | |
| Eldon | Mason County | |
| Elk | Spokane County | |
| Ellisford | Okanogan County | |
| Eltopia | Franklin County | |
| Elwha | Clallam County | |
| Espanola | Spokane County | |
| Eureka | Walla Walla County | |
| Evans | Stevens County | |
| Fairholm(e) | Clallam County | |
| Fairwood | Spokane County | |
| Fargher Lake | Clark County | |
| Finn Hill | King County | |
| Fishtrap | Lincoln County | |
| Fobes Hill | Mason County | |
| Ford | Stevens County | |
| Fortson | Snohomish County | |
| Frances | Pacific County | |
| Frankfort | Pacific County | |
| Fruitland | Stevens County | |
| Galena | Snohomish County | |
| Gardiner | Jefferson County | |
| Geiger | Spokane County | |
| Getchell | Snohomish County | |
| Gifford | Stevens County | |
| Gilmer | Klickitat County | |
| Glenoma | Lewis County | |
| Goose Prairie | Yakima County | |
| Gorst | Kitsap County | |
| Gould City | Garfield County | |
| Govan | Lincoln County | |
| Grapeview | Mason County | |
| Grays | Stevens County | |
| Grays River | Wahkiakum County | |
| Green Bluff | Spokane County | |
| Greenbank | Island County | |
| Greenwood | Whatcom County | |
| Gromore | Yakima County | |
| Grotto | King County | |
| Guemes | Skagit County | |
| Hanford | Benton County | |
| Hansville | Kitsap County | |
| Harmony | Lewis County | |
| Harstine (Island) / Harstene | Mason County | |
| Hay | Whitman County | |
| Hazel | Snohomish County | |
| Highland | Benton County | |
| High Rock | Snohomish County | |
| Hillyard | Spokane County | |
| Hogan's Corner | Grays Harbor County | |
| Holden Village | Chelan County | |
| Holly | Kitsap County | |
| Holman | Pacific County | |
| Home | Pierce County | |
| Home Valley | Skamania County | |
| Hoodsport | Mason County | |
| Hoogdal | Skagit County | Sedro-Woolley |
| Hooper | Whitman County | |
| Hunters | Stevens County | |
| Huntsville | Columbia County | |
| Husum | Klickitat County | |
| Hyak | Kittitas County | |
| Illahee | Kitsap County | |
| Impach | Ferry County | |
| Inglewood | King County | |
| Irby | Lincoln County | |
| Irondale | Jefferson County | |
| Jameson | Douglas County | Mansfield |
| Jamestown | Clallam County | |
| Jared | Pend Oreille County | |
| Johnson | Whitman County | |
| Joyce | Clallam County | |
| Junction City | Grays Harbor County | |
| Kalaloch | Jefferson County | |
| Kanaskat | King County | |
| Kangley | King County | |
| Kapowsin | Pierce County | |
| Keller | Ferry County | |
| Keyport | Kitsap County | |
| Keystone | Island County | |
| Kid Valley | Cowlitz County | |
| Kiona | Benton County | |
| Klaber | Lewis County | |
| Kopiah | Lewis County | |
| Krain | King County | |
| La Grande | Pierce County | |
| Lakebay | Pierce County | |
| Lake McMurray | Skagit County | |
| Lakeridge | King County | |
| Lake Stickney | Snohomish County | |
| Lamoine | Douglas County | |
| Lamona | Lincoln County | |
| La Push | Clallam County | |
| Laurel | Whatcom County | |
| Laurier | Ferry County | |
| Lawrence | Whatcom County | |
| Leadpoint | Stevens County | |
| Liberty | Kittitas County | |
| Lilliwaup | Mason County | |
| Lincoln (Mill) | Lincoln County | |
| Little Boston | Kitsap County | |
| Littlerock | Thurston County | |
| Longmire | Pierce County | |
| Loon Lake | Stevens County | |
| Lopez | San Juan County | |
| Lowden | Walla Walla County | |
| Lowell | Snohomish County | |
| Lucerne | Chelan County | |
| Mae | Grant County | |
| Malaga | Chelan County | |
| Malo | Ferry County | |
| Malone | Grays Harbor County | |
| Malott | Okanogan County | |
| Manson | Chelan County | |
| Maple Heights-Lake Desire | King County | |
| Marble | Stevens County | |
| Marengo | Columbia County | |
| Marietta | Whatcom County | Bellingham |
| Marshall | Spokane County | |
| Matlock | Mason County | |
| Maud | Stevens County | |
| Maxwelton | Island County | |
| Maytown | Thurston County | |
| Mayview | Garfield County | |
| Mazama | Okanogan County | |
| McCormick | Lewis County | |
| McGowan | Pacific County | |
| McKenna | Pierce County | |
| McMillin | Pierce County | |
| Mead | Spokane County | |
| Megler | Pacific County | |
| Menlo | Pacific County | |
| Merritt | Chelan County | |
| Methow | Okanogan County | |
| Mica | Spokane County | |
| Milan | Spokane County | |
| Miles | Lincoln County | |
| Milltown | Skagit County | |
| Mima | Thurston County | |
| Mineral | Lewis County | |
| Mohler | Lincoln County | |
| Mohrweis | Mason County | |
| Molson | Okanogan County | |
| Monitor | Chelan County | |
| Monte Cristo | Snohomish County | |
| Moore | Chelan County | |
| Morton | Lewis County | |
| Mountain View | Asotin County | |
| Nahcotta | Pacific County | |
| Nemah | Pacific County | |
| Newhalem | Whatcom County | |
| Newman Lake | Spokane County | |
| Nighthawk | Okanogan County | |
| Nile | Yakima County | |
| Nine Mile Falls | Spokane County | |
| Nordland | Jefferson County | |
| North Cove | Pacific County | |
| North Lynnwood | Snohomish County | |
| Novelty Hill | King County | |
| Nugents Corner | Whatcom County | |
| Olalla | Kitsap County | |
| Olema | Okanogan County | |
| Olequa | Cowlitz County | |
| Olga | San Juan County | |
| Onalaska | Lewis County | |
| Orcas (Village) | San Juan County | |
| Orient | Ferry County | |
| Orin | Stevens County | |
| Orondo | Douglas County | Orondo |
| Osceola | King County | |
| Otis Orchards | Spokane County | |
| Outlook | Yakima County | |
| Oy(e)hut | Grays Harbor County | |
| Oysterville | Pacific County | |
| Ozette | Clallam County | |
| Pacific Beach | Grays Harbor County | |
| Packwood | Lewis County | |
| Paha | Adams County | |
| Palisades | Douglas County | |
| Palmer | King County | |
| Parker | Yakima County | |
| Paterson | Benton County | |
| Penrith | Pend Oreille County | |
| Peola | Garfield County | |
| Peone | Spokane County | |
| Peshastin | Chelan County | |
| Picnic Point | Snohomish County | |
| Pinkney City | Stevens County | |
| Plain | Chelan County | |
| Plaza | Spokane County | |
| Pleasant Hill | Cowlitz County | |
| Pluvius | Pacific County | |
| Plymouth | Benton County | |
| Point Roberts | Whatcom County | |
| Pomona | Yakima County | |
| Porter | Grays Harbor County | |
| Port Gamble | Kitsap County | |
| Port Hadlock | Jefferson County | |
| Port Williams | Clallam County | |
| Potlatch | Mason County | |
| Preston | King County | |
| Proebstel | Clark County | |
| Puget | Thurston County | |
| Purdy | Pierce County | |
| Pysht | Clallam County | |
| Queets | Jefferson County | |
| Quinault | Grays Harbor County | |
| Ralston | Adams County | |
| Randle | Lewis County | |
| Redondo | King County | |
| Rice | Stevens County | |
| Riverton | King County | |
| Robe | Snohomish County | |
| Rogersburg | Asotin County | |
| Rosburg | Wahkiakum County | |
| Rosedale | Pierce County | |
| Rose Valley | Cowlitz County | |
| Royal City | Grant County | |
| Ruff | Grant County | |
| Ryderwood | Cowlitz County | |
| St. Andrews | Douglas County | Coulee City |
| Salkum | Lewis County | |
| San de Fuca | Island County | |
| Sappho | Clallam County | |
| Saxon | Whatcom County | |
| Seabeck | Kitsap County | |
| Seabrook | Grays Harbor County | |
| Seaview | Pacific County | |
| Sekiu | Clallam County | |
| Selleck | King County | |
| Shaw Island | San Juan County | |
| Sherman | Lincoln County | |
| Silcott | Asotin County | |
| Silver Creek | Lewis County | |
| Silver Firs | Snohomish County | |
| Silverlake | Cowlitz County | |
| Skagit City | Skagit County | |
| Skamania | Skamania County | |
| Skamokawa | Wahkiakum County | |
| Skyway | King County | |
| Smyrna | Grant County | |
| Snee Oosh | Skagit County | |
| Spring Glen | King County | |
| Stabler | Skamania County | |
| Stehekin | Chelan County | |
| Steptoe | Whitman County | |
| Sterling | Skagit County | |
| Stillwater | King County | |
| Stratford | Grant County | |
| Sunrise | Pierce County | |
| Tahuya | Mason County | |
| Tampico | Yakima County | |
| Taunton | Adams County | Othello |
| Teanaway | Kittitas County | |
| Telford | Lincoln County | |
| Telma | Chelan County | |
| Thornton | Whitman County | |
| Thrall | Kittitas County | |
| Tiger | Pend Oreille County | |
| Torboy | Ferry County | |
| Toutle | Cowlitz County | |
| Trafton | Snohomish County | |
| Trinidad | Grant County | |
| Tumtum | Stevens County | |
| Turner | Columbia County | |
| Tyler | Spokane County | |
| Underwood | Skamania County | |
| Union | Mason County | |
| Usk | Pend Oreille County | |
| Vail | Thurston County | |
| Valley | Stevens County | |
| Valleyford | Spokane County | |
| Van Horn | Skagit County | |
| Van Zandt | Whatcom County | Deming |
| Vashon | King County | |
| Vesta | Grays Harbor County | |
| Vineland | Asotin County | |
| Waldron | San Juan County | |
| Ward | Stevens County | |
| Wauconda | Okanogan County | |
| Waukon | Lincoln County | |
| Wauna | Pierce County | |
| Welcome | Whatcom County | |
| Wellpinit | Stevens County | |
| Wenatchee Heights | Chelan County | |
| West Clarkston | Asotin County | |
| Westlake | Grant County | Moses Lake |
| White Bluffs | Benton County | |
| Whitney | Skagit County | |
| Whitstran | Benton County | Prosser |
| Wickersham | Whatcom County | |
| Wilcox | Whitman County | |
| Wildwood | Lewis County | |
| Wiley City | Yakima County | |
| Willapa | Pacific County | |
| Wilson | Lewis County | |
| Winesap | Chelan County | |
| Winona | Whitman County | |
| Winton | Chelan County | |
| Wishkah | Grays Harbor County | |
| Withrow | Douglas County | |
| Wollochet | Pierce County | |
| Wymer | Kittitas County | |
| Yale | Cowlitz County | |
