= Home Valley =

Home Valley may refer to:

- Home Valley Station, a cattle station in Western Australia
- Home Valley, Washington, an unincorporated community in the United States
