= Maud =

== As a name ==
=== Placename ===
In Antarctica:
- Queen Maud Land (Norwegian: Dronning Maud Land), an area of 2.5 million square kilometers (1 million sq. mi.) claimed by Norway in 1938
In Canada:
- Queen Maud Gulf, Nunavut, Canada
In New Zealand:
- Maud Island, the second largest island in the Marlborough Sounds
In Scotland:
- Maud, Aberdeenshire, a small town in the Buchan area of the county of Aberdeenshire
In the United States:
- Maud, Illinois, an unincorporated community in Wabash County
- Maud, Iowa, an unincorporated community in Allamakee County
- Maud, Missouri, an unincorporated community
- Maud, Oklahoma, a city in Pottawatomie County
- Maud, Texas, a city in Bowie County
- Maud, Washington, an unincorporated community

=== Ship name ===
- HNoMS Maud, a replenishment ship of the Royal Norwegian Navy, currently being fitted out
- Maud, a ship used from 1918 to 1925 by Norwegian explorer Roald Amundsen in exploring the Northeast Passage (now known as the Northern Sea Route)
- Maud, a Norfolk wherry built in 1899
- SS Dronning Maud, a Norwegian Hurtigruten ship sunk under controversial circumstances by German bombers during the 1940 Norwegian Campaign
- SS Princess Maud (1902), a passenger/cargo steamship torpedoed in 1918
- TSS Princess Maud (1934), a ferry generally plying the Irish Sea but also a troopship in the Second World War
- USS Maud (SP-1009), a United States Navy patrol boat in commission from 1917 to 1919

== In literature ==
- Maud and other poems, an 1855 volume of poetry by English poet Alfred, Lord Tennyson
- "Maud" (poem), title poem in the 1855 volume by Alfred, Lord Tennyson
- Maud, a werecat in the Inheritance Cycle

== Other uses ==
Maud may also refer to:

- Master of Architecture in Urban Design degree
- Maud (plaid), a black and white checked plaid once worn in southern Scotland and northern England
- MAUD Committee, the beginning of the British atomic bomb project, before the United Kingdom joined forces with the United States in the Manhattan Project
- MAUD Program, a program for analysis of materials using diffraction, based on the Rietveld refinement method
- Maud Pie, a character in My Little Pony: Friendship is Magic

== See also ==
- Matilda (disambiguation)
