= Nugents Corner, Washington =

Unincorporated community in Washington, US

Nugents Corner
- Unincorporated community
- Interactive map of Nugents Corner
- Coordinates: 48°50′36.42″N 122°17′17.57″W
- Country: United States
- State: Washington
- County: Whatcom

Government
  - Type: Unincorporated community
  - Body: Whatcom County
- Elevation: 161 ft (49 m)
- Time zone: UTC–8 (Pacific (PST))
  - Summer (DST): UTC–7 (PDT)
- ZIP Code: 98247
- Area codes: 360, 564
- GNIS feature ID: 1513944

Nugents Corner (previously North Cedarville) is an unincorporated community in Whatcom County, Washington, United States. It is located along State Route 542 where it intersects with State Route 9, along the Nooksack River.

== History ==
Before 1991, the official name of the community was North Cedarville, after the Cedarville Shingle Company. The state of Washington officially changed the name to Nugents Corner in 1991.

There are several stories pertaining to the current name of the community. Lottie Roeder Roth's 1926 book History of Whatcom County mentions Peter Nugent, a homesteader who lived in the area in the 1870s and ran a ferry service across the Nooksack. Not much is known about Peter Nugent, some sources describing him as an Irishman and others a native. Another theory attributes the name to a merchant named Henry Nugent. An immigrant from Canada of Irish descent, Nugent moved to Whatcom County in 1888, first living on Lummi Island. In 1910, he opened a store at Nugents Corner. It is unclear if the area was already called that at the time.

In 1893 a plank bridge was built over the Nooksack River at Nugents Corner, which became a part of the highway from Bellingham to Mount Baker. This bridge has been replaced twice since then, first with a truss bridge, and then in 1999 with a concrete bridge.

== Recreation ==
In 2004, Whatcom County Parks and Recreation acquired 14.2 acres (5.7 ha) of land in Nugents Corner and established a park. The park has 0.5 miles (0.80 km) of trails, and allows access to the river via trail or boat ramp.

== See also ==
- Cedarville, Whatcom County, Washington, directly across the river from Nugents Corner
- List of unincorporated communities in Washington
