= Nellie Geraldine Best =

American artist

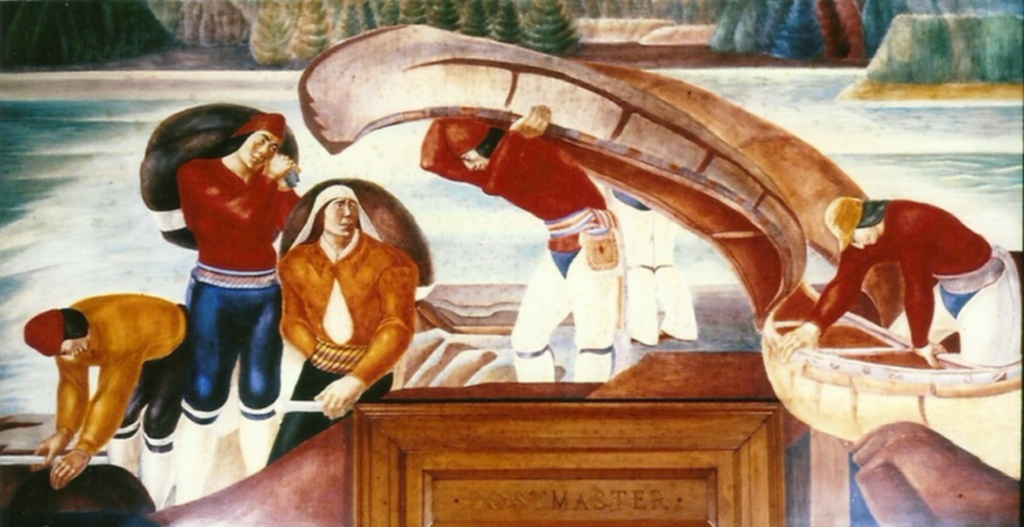
- Early Voyageurs at Portage (1940)
- Born: May 22, 1905; Sterling, Washington, U.S.
- Died: June 2, 1990 (aged 85); Eugene, Oregon, U.S.
- Other names: Nellie G. Best, Nell Best

Nellie Geraldine Best (May 22, 1905 – June 2, 1990) was an American artist known for her sculptures, paintings, and murals. She was active in Oregon, California, and Minneapolis, from the 1930s until the 1950s.

== Biography ==
Nellie Geraldine Best was born in Sterling, Washington, on May 22, 1905. Best graduated from the University of Oregon with a B.A. degree (1929) and a M.F.A. degree (1930).

Best won an honorable mention in a national competition to paint murals; the award was for her mural in the Social Security Administration building in Washington, D.C.

In 1940, Best painted Early Voyageurs at Portage as part of a Works Progress Administration's Federal Art Project for the post office in White Bear Lake, Minnesota. The work Early Voyageurs at Portage was removed in the 1970s from the post office and is now lost. In 1942, Best painted two 16-foot long, oil on canvas murals for the post office in Ontario, California, entitled The Dream, which depicted George Chaffey, the founder of the city, with surveyors and the second canvas, entitled The Reality, which showed a view of the completed city's Euclid Avenue.

In the 1960s she taught art classes in Oregon. Best died on June 22, 1990, in Eugene, Oregon.
