= Blockhouse fort =

Blockhouse fort may refer to various blockhouse forts including:

- Blockhouse, Washington, a town named after a fort
- Fort Blockhouse, in Hampshire, England.
- West Blockhouse Fort in Pembrokeshire, Wales
- The blockhouse fort central to the Battle of Seattle (1856)
