= Highland High School (Washington) =

Location
- 17000 Summitview Rd., Cowiche, Washington; United States; 46°40′29″N 120°42′44″W

Information
- School district: Highland School District #203
- Principal: Jeremy Gillespie
- Enrollment: 364 (2023-2024)
- Color
- Team name: Scots
- Website: Highland H.S.

Highland High School is a public high school located in Cowiche, Washington. It is the only high school in the Highland School District. The school serves 348 students in grades 9–12. 62% of the students are Hispanic, while 36% are White, 1% are American Indian and 1% are two or more races.
