= Waukon =

Waukon may refer to a place in the United States:

- Waukon, Iowa
- Waukon, Washington
- Waukon Township, Minnesota
