= Allan Island (Washington) =

Island in Skagit County, Washington, United States

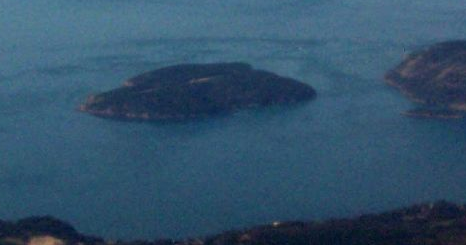
- View of Allan Island

- Location within Washington (state)

Geography
- Location: Rosario Strait
- Coordinates: 48°27′52″N 122°42′12″W
- Highest elevation: 230 ft (70 m)

Administration
- United States
- State: Washington (state)
- County: Skagit County, Washington

Additional information
- private island

Allan Island is a 292-acre (118 ha) private island bordering Rosario Strait, in Skagit County, northwest Washington (state). It adjoins Burrows Island, with the nearest city and airport close by at Anacortes on Fidalgo Island. It was named during the 1841 Wilkes expedition in honor of Lt. William Henry Allen, who was killed while commanding the USS Argus (1803) during the War of 1812.

Microsoft billionaire Paul Allen purchased the island in 1992. Allen originally intended to build a vacation home on Allan Island, until he bought a separate property in the San Juans in 1996 that he preferred instead. An attempt to sell Allan Island in 2005 for $25 million failed to attract buyers. Allen again tried to sell the island in 2011 for $13.5 million. He finally sold it in December 2013 for $8 million. The current owner of Allen Island is Eric C. Anderson, the co-founder and chairman of Space Adventures, a commercial spaceflight company promoting space tourism.

The island has six beaches, and caretaker's quarters but remains largely undeveloped. Access to the island is by small aircraft landing on a grassy airstrip, or by boat or seaplane mooring to a dock.
