= 2004 United States presidential election in Washington (state) =

- November 2, 2004
- Turnout: 82.05% (of registered voters) ▲6.59%

Nominee	John Kerry	George W. Bush
Party	Democratic	Republican
Home state	Massachusetts	Texas
Running mate	John Edwards	Dick Cheney
Electoral vote	11	0
Popular vote	1,510,201	1,304,894
Percentage	52.82%	45.64%

Kerry
50–60%
60–70%
70–80%
Bush
50–60%
60–70%
70–80%
President before election
George W. Bush
Republican
Elected President
George W. Bush
Republican

The 2004 United States presidential election in Washington took place on November 2, 2004, and was part of the 2004 United States presidential election. Voters chose 11 representatives, or electors to the Electoral College, who voted for president and vice president.

The State of Washington was considered a competitive swing state in 2004, and on election day, Kerry won the state with a margin of 7.2%. This is the most recent presidential election in which Washington was considered a swing state. As of the 2024 presidential election, this remains the last time the state's margin of victory was in single digits and the last time a Republican received more than 45% of the state's vote. This was the only time since statehood that any president was elected twice without carrying Washington either time, a feat that lasted until 2024.

== Caucuses ==
- 2004 Washington Democratic presidential caucuses

== Campaign ==
=== Predictions ===
There were 12 news organizations who made state-by-state predictions of the election. Here are their last predictions before election day.

Source	Ranking
D.C. Political Report	Solid D
Cook Political Report	Solid D
Newsweek	Solid D
Zogby International	Likely D
Washington Post	Likely D
Research 2000	Solid D
Washington Times	Solid D
Washington Dispatch	Likely D
The New York Times	Solid D
CNN	Likely D
Associated Press	Solid D
Rasmussen Reports	Likely D

=== Polling ===
Kerry won every single pre-election except one tie. The final 3 poll average had Kerry winning with 50% to 45%.

=== Fundraising ===
Bush raised $3,263,363. Kerry raised $5,337,921.

=== Advertising and visits ===
Neither campaign advertised or visited this state during the fall election.

== Analysis ==
A Democratic leaning swing state at the time, Washington has voted for the Democratic presidential nominee in every presidential election since 1988. Like Oregon, the state is divided politically by the urban/rural divide and geographically by the Cascade Mountains. Most of the state's population resides in Western Washington along the Pacific Coast and in highly urbanized areas like Seattle; this part of the state votes overwhelmingly Democratic. The other side of the mountains in Eastern Washington is much more rural and conservative and therefore heavily Republican. While polling showed that voters trusted Bush more than Kerry on the issue of terrorism, the Iraq War and Bush's domestic policies were unpopular in the state. As of the 2024 presidential election, this is the last election in which Clark County, Island County, and Skagit County voted for the Republican candidate.

== Results ==
2004 United States presidential election in Washington
Party	Candidate	Votes	%	±%
Democratic	John Kerry John Edwards	1,510,201	52.82%	+2.66%
Republican	George W. Bush Dick Cheney	1,304,894	45.64%	+1.06%
Independent	Ralph Nader Peter Camejo	23,283	0.81%	N/A
Libertarian	Michael Badnarik Richard Campagna	11,955	0.42%	−0.11%
Constitution	Michael Peroutka Chuck Baldwin	3,922	0.14%	+0.06%
Green	David Cobb Pat LaMarche	2,974	0.10%	−4.04%
Workers World	John Parker Teresa Gutierrez	1,077	0.04%	−0.03%
Socialist Workers	Roger Calero Margaret Trowe	547	0.02%	+0.01%
Socialist Equality	Bill Van Auken Jim Lawrence	231	0.01%	N/A
Total votes		2,859,084	100.00%	N/A

=== By county ===
County	John Kerry Democratic		George W. Bush Republican		Various candidates Other parties		Margin		Total
County	#	%	#	%	#	%	#	%	Total
Adams	1,315	25.65%	3,751	73.16%	61	1.19%	-2,436	-47.51%	5,127
Asotin	3,319	37.78%	5,320	60.55%	147	1.67%	-2,001	-22.77%	8,786
Benton	21,549	32.22%	44,350	66.31%	987	1.48%	-22,801	-34.09%	66,886
Chelan	10,471	35.62%	18,482	62.87%	443	1.51%	-8,011	-27.25%	29,396
Clallam	17,049	46.37%	18,871	51.33%	846	2.30%	-1,822	-4.96%	36,766
Clark	79,538	46.67%	88,646	52.01%	2,255	1.32%	-9,108	-5.34%	170,439
Columbia	605	28.71%	1,470	69.77%	32	1.52%	-865	-41.05%	2,107
Cowlitz	21,589	50.83%	20,217	47.60%	667	1.57%	1,372	3.23%	42,473
Douglas	4,306	32.20%	8,900	66.56%	166	1.24%	-4,594	-34.36%	13,372
Ferry	1,201	35.95%	2,019	60.43%	121	3.62%	-818	-24.48%	3,341
Franklin	5,188	32.11%	10,757	66.57%	214	1.32%	-5,569	-34.46%	16,159
Garfield	365	27.65%	935	70.83%	20	1.52%	-570	-43.18%	1,320
Grant	7,779	29.92%	17,799	68.47%	417	1.60%	-10,020	-38.55%	25,995
Grays Harbor	14,583	52.17%	12,871	46.05%	499	1.79%	1,712	6.12%	27,953
Island	18,216	47.24%	19,754	51.23%	589	1.53%	-1,538	-3.99%	38,559
Jefferson	11,610	62.37%	6,650	35.72%	356	1.91%	4,960	26.64%	18,616
King	580,378	64.95%	301,043	33.69%	12,113	1.36%	279,335	31.26%	893,534
Kitsap	60,796	51.32%	55,608	46.95%	2,049	1.73%	5,188	4.38%	118,453
Kittitas	6,731	41.85%	9,052	56.28%	301	1.87%	-2,321	-14.43%	16,084
Klickitat	4,036	43.69%	5,016	54.30%	185	2.00%	-980	-10.61%	9,237
Lewis	10,726	33.08%	21,042	64.89%	660	2.04%	-10,316	-31.81%	32,428
Lincoln	1,706	29.36%	4,015	69.09%	90	1.55%	-2,309	-39.73%	5,811
Mason	12,894	50.78%	11,987	47.20%	513	2.02%	907	3.57%	25,394
Okanogan	6,309	38.61%	9,636	58.96%	397	2.43%	-3,327	-20.36%	16,342
Pacific	5,570	53.40%	4,634	44.43%	227	2.18%	936	8.97%	10,431
Pend Oreille	2,310	37.27%	3,693	59.58%	195	3.15%	-1,383	-22.31%	6,198
Pierce	158,231	50.50%	150,783	48.12%	4,317	1.38%	7,448	2.38%	313,331
San Juan	6,589	65.32%	3,290	32.61%	209	2.07%	3,299	32.70%	10,088
Skagit	25,131	48.12%	26,139	50.05%	960	1.84%	-1,008	-1.93%	52,230
Skamania	2,374	46.02%	2,695	52.24%	90	1.74%	-321	-6.22%	5,159
Snohomish	156,468	53.04%	134,317	45.53%	4,212	1.43%	22,151	7.51%	294,997
Spokane	87,490	43.19%	111,606	55.09%	3,491	1.72%	-24,116	-11.90%	202,587
Stevens	6,822	33.54%	13,015	63.99%	503	2.47%	-6,193	-30.45%	20,340
Thurston	62,650	55.55%	47,992	42.55%	2,147	1.90%	14,658	13.00%	112,789
Wahkiakum	1,021	45.68%	1,171	52.39%	43	1.92%	-150	-6.71%	2,235
Walla Walla	8,257	36.02%	14,323	62.48%	345	1.50%	-6,066	-26.46%	22,925
Whatcom	48,268	53.40%	40,296	44.58%	1,830	2.02%	7,972	8.82%	90,394
Whitman	8,287	46.01%	9,397	52.17%	328	1.82%	-1,110	-6.16%	18,012
Yakima	28,474	39.12%	43,352	59.56%	964	1.32%	-14,878	-20.44%	72,790
Totals	1,510,201	52.82%	1,304,894	45.64%	43,989	1.54%	205,307	7.18%	2,859,084

==== Counties that flipped from Republican to Democratic ====
- Whatcom (Largest city: Bellingham)

=== By congressional district ===
Kerry won six of nine congressional districts. Both candidates won a district held by the other party.

District	Bush	Kerry	Representative
1st	42%	56%	Jay Inslee
2nd	47%	51%	Rick Larsen
3rd	50%	48%	Brian Baird
4th	63%	35%	Doc Hastings
5th	57%	41%	George Nethercutt
5th	57%	41%	Cathy McMorris Rodgers
6th	45%	53%	Norm Dicks
7th	19%	79%	Jim McDermott
8th	48%	51%	Jennifer Dunn
8th	48%	51%	Dave Reichert
9th	46%	53%	Adam Smith

== Electors ==
Technically the voters of Washington cast their ballots for electors: representatives to the Electoral College. Washington is allocated 11 electors because it has 9 congressional districts and 2 senators. All candidates who appear on the ballot or qualify to receive write-in votes must submit a list of 11 electors, who pledge to vote for their candidate and their running mate. Whoever wins the majority of votes in the state is awarded all 11 electoral votes. Their chosen electors then vote for president and vice president. Although electors are pledged to their candidate and running mate, they are not obligated to vote for them. An elector who votes for someone other than their candidate is known as a faithless elector.

The electors of each state and the District of Columbia met on December 13, 2004, to cast their votes for president and vice president. The Electoral College itself never meets as one body. Instead the electors from each state and the District of Columbia met in their respective capitols.

The following were the members of the Electoral College from the state. All 11 were pledged for Kerry/Edwards:

1. David Peterson
2. Mary Ervin
3. Valeria Ogden
4. Patsy Whitefoot
5. Larry Armstrong
6. Ken Bumgarner
7. Richard Kelley
8. Sarah Chandler
9. Greg Markley
10. Alan Johanson
11. Mary Crosby

== See also ==
- United States presidential elections in Washington (state)
- Presidency of George W. Bush
