= Curlew Lake, Washington =

- Census-designated place
- Location within Washington (state) Location within the United States
- Coordinates: 48°44′40″N 118°39′46″W
- Country: United States
- State: Washington
- County: Pierce

Area
  - Total: 5.7 sq mi (14.8 km^{2})
  - Land: 4.4 sq mi (11.3 km^{2})
  - Water: 1.4 sq mi (3.5 km^{2})
- Elevation: 2,356 ft (718 m)

Population (2010)
  - Total: 462
  - Density: 106/sq mi (40.9/km^{2})
- Time zone: Pacific
- ZIP Code: 99166
- Area code(s): 360, 564
- GNIS feature ID: 2631348

Curlew Lake is a census-designated place (CDP) in Ferry County, Washington that surrounds Curlew Lake northeast of Republic, Washington. As of the 2020 census, Curlew Lake had a population of 512.

== Demographics ==
Historical population
Census	Pop.	Note	%±
2010	462		—
2020	512		10.8%
U.S. Decennial Census; 2000 2010

Curlew Lake first appeared as a census designated place in the 2010 U.S. census.

=== Racial and ethnic composition ===
Curlew Lake CDP, Washington – Racial and ethnic composition Note: the US Census treats Hispanic/Latino as an ethnic category. This table excludes Latinos from the racial categories and assigns them to a separate category. Hispanics/Latinos may be of any race.
Race / Ethnicity (NH = Non-Hispanic)	Pop 2010	Pop 2020	% 2010	% 2020
White alone (NH)	419	453	90.69%	88.48%
Black or African American alone (NH)	0	0	0.00%	0.00%
Native American or Alaska Native alone (NH)	5	5	1.08%	0.98%
Asian alone (NH)	0	0	0.00%	0.00%
Native Hawaiian or Pacific Islander alone (NH)	0	1	0.00%	0.20%
Other race alone (NH)	0	5	0.00%	0.98%
Mixed race or Multiracial (NH)	17	34	3.68%	6.64%
Hispanic or Latino (any race)	21	14	4.55%	2.73%
Total	462	512	100.00%	100.00%

=== 2010 census ===
In 2010, it had a population of 462. The census reported a gender makeup of 228 males and 234 females.

== Geography ==
Curlew Lake is located in northwestern Ferry County. The community includes all of Curlew Lake, a 5-mile-long (8 km) water body at the head of Curlew Creek, as well as land on all sides of the lake, bounded to the east by Washington State Route 21, to the south by West Herron Creek Road, and to the west and north by West Curlew Lake Road. The CDP contains the unincorporated community of Pollard, located on the west side of the lake. Curlew State Park is on the east side of the lake, directly across from Pollard. The CDP is bordered to the south by Torboy, and Republic, the Ferry County seat, is 9 miles (14 km) to the southwest via WA 21.

According to the United States Census Bureau, the Curlew Lake CDP has a total area of 5.7 square miles (14.8 km^{2}), of which 4.4 square miles (11.3 km^{2}) is land and 1.4 square miles (3.5 km^{2}), or 23.47%, is water, comprising the lake itself. The lake drains to the north via Curlew Creek, a tributary of the Kettle River, which flows north, then east, then south to the Columbia River near Kettle Falls, Washington.
