= Saxon, Washington =

Unincorporated community in Washington, US

- Unincorporated community
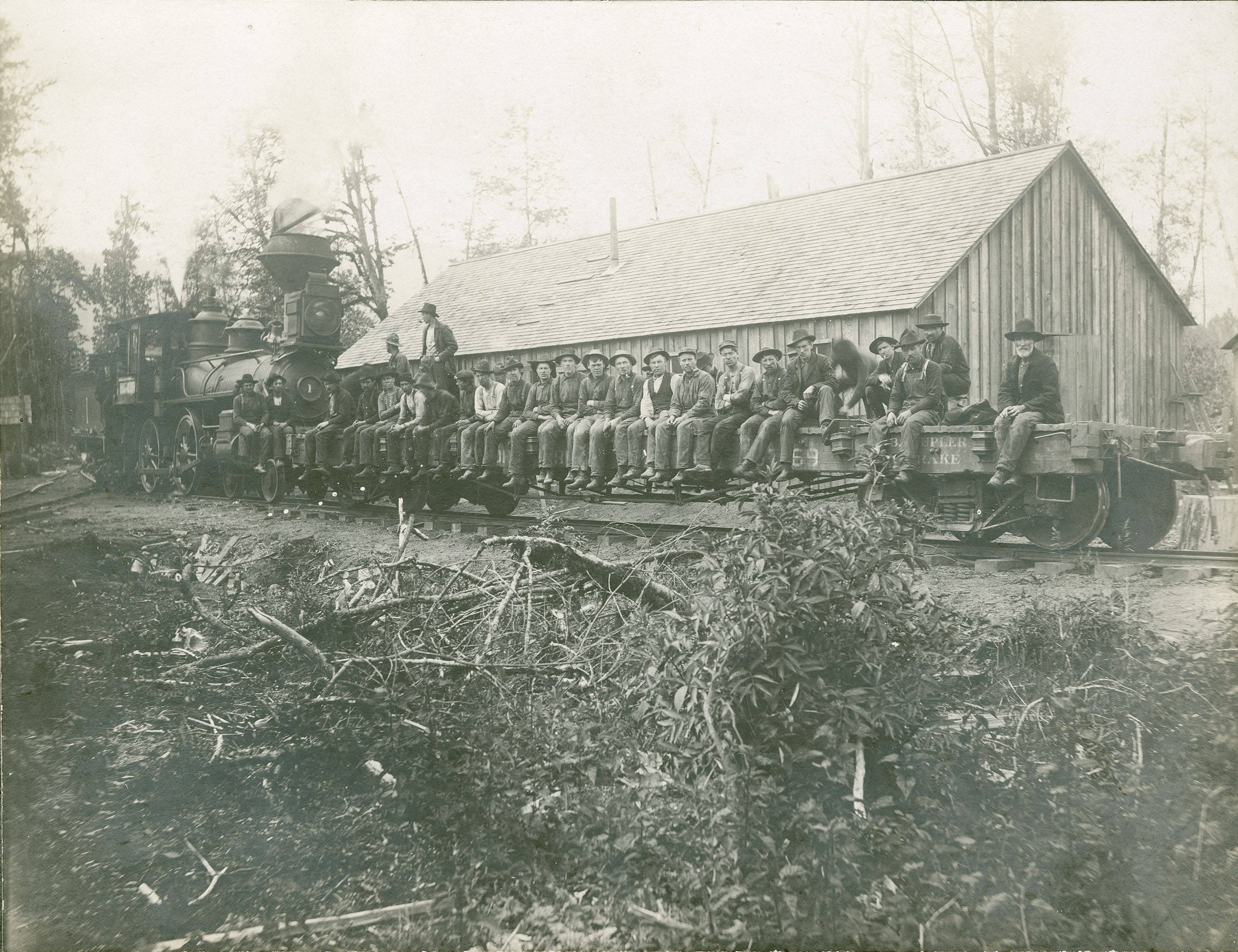
- Crew of the Ferguson Logging Co. Camp at Nesset Farm in Saxon (1905)
- Interactive map of Saxon, Washington
- Coordinates: 48°41′15.41″N 122°11′19.57″W
- Country: United States
- State: Washington
- County: Whatcom

Government
  - Type: Unincorporated community
  - Body: Whatcom County
- Elevation: 325 ft (99 m)
- Time zone: UTC–8 (Pacific (PST))
  - Summer (DST): UTC–7 (PDT)
- ZIP Code: 98220
- Area codes: 360, 564
- GNIS feature ID: 1525468

Saxon is an unincorporated community in south-western Whatcom County between Acme and Wickersham along Washington State Route 9.

Like other communities in the South Fork Valley, Saxon was built to accommodate the growing lumber industry in the area, and waned as the lumber industry did. Unlike the others, however, Saxon never became a town.

== History ==
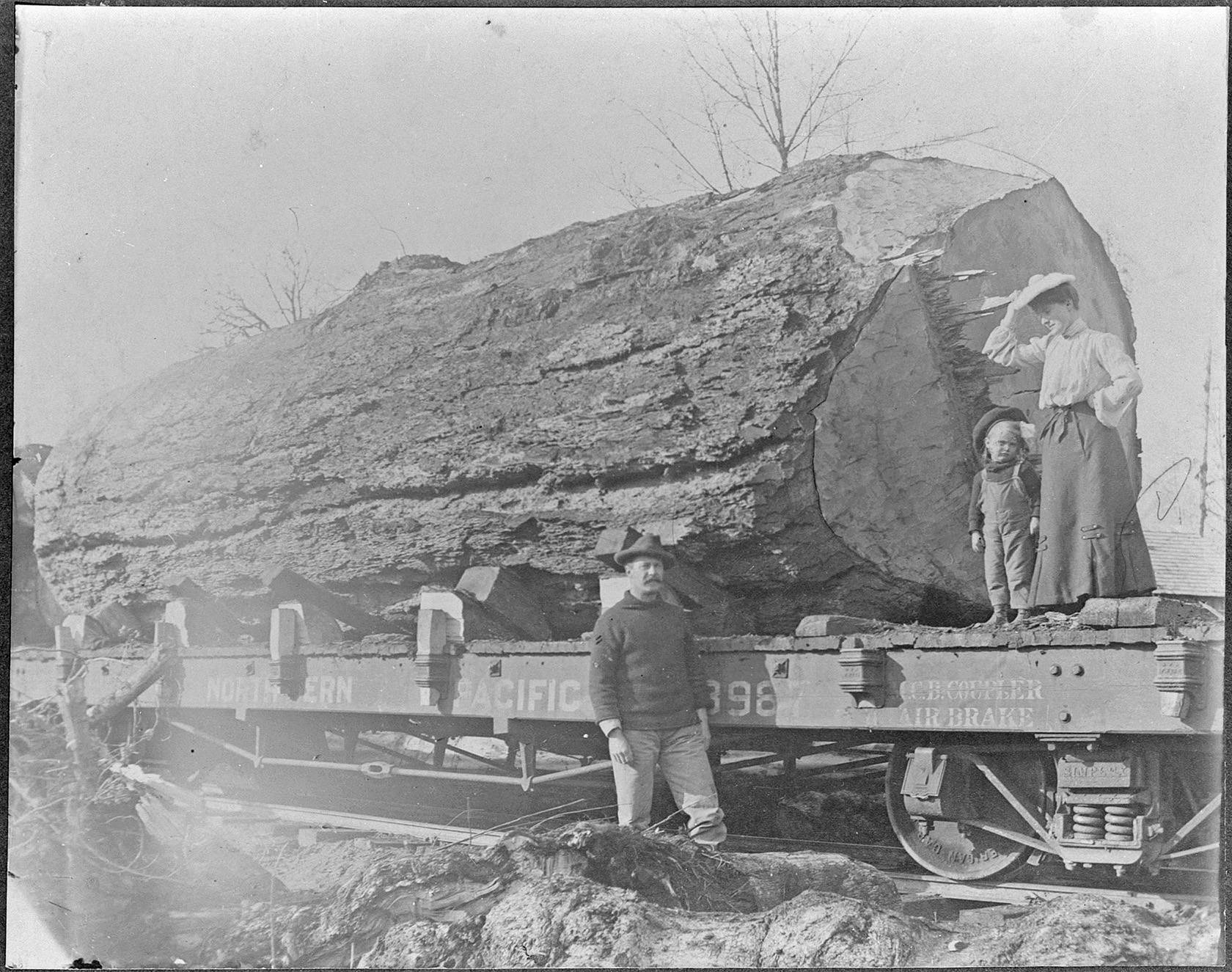
Large fir log from Saxon (1905)

John Bruns, a German immigrant who moved to Washington from North Dakota, was the first to settle in Saxon in 1883.

Saxon was named after Elizabeth Lyle Saxon, a widow from Tennessee who came to Whatcom County in 1885 and homesteaded at Saxon.

Established in 1890 with John O. Wilson as its first postmaster, the Saxon post office operated until 1903, when it closed under John Bruns, who had previously served as both the third and fifth postmaster.

The Saxon school district was established in 1887 and covered both Saxon and Acme, serving students from Acme before they built their own school. A schoolhouse with one room was built in 1895, and one with two opened on January 31, 1910. After the bigger one was built the one room schoolhouse was used for manual training. A teacher's cottage was also built nearby, which burned down in 1905 and was rebuilt into improved teacherage. Saxon consolidated with Acme in 1937, which later was absorbed into Mount Baker School District.

Bloedel Donovan Lumber Mills opened a camp at Saxon in November 1919. In July 1922 a fire burned through the camp, burning through a flatcar of equipment and a large portion of the camp's green timber. This fire closed the camp for some time, and during the Great Depression the camp only ran intermittently. In its 21 years of production the camp produced 783,634,000 feet (238,852,000 m) of fir, hemlock, and cedar logs. The camp shut down permanently in 1941 and its equipment was moved to a camp in Clallam Bay.

In 1962 a 200-foot (61 m) steel truss bridge was moved from Lynden to Saxon, replacing a bridge there that was deteriorating and becoming unsafe. Later, in 1998, the Whatcom County Council approved $1.6 million (equivalent to $3.2 million in 2025) to replace the bridge. Construction started later that year.

== Geography ==
=== Wildlife ===
Chinook salmon are an important species in the Nooksack River and Puget Sound, and the Skookum Creek Hatchery in Saxon, constructed in 1970, has played a major role in their restoration. The Lummi Nation, which operates the hatchery, has also developed plans to improve the river's ability to support salmon spawning, including in the Saxon area.

The first inland marbled murrelet egg was found in Saxon in 1925.

== Recreation ==
Saxon used to be a popular spot for tubing, with over 200 people a day parking at and around Saxon's bridge in 1998, with hundreds more on weekends, but in 2022 the Whatcom County Council voted on banning flotation devices on the South Fork Nooksack River from June to October to protect salmon habitat. The ban includes tubing, kayaking, and paddleboarding, among others, all of which used to be popular activities on the river.

Hiking and camping remain popular activities around Saxon, as there are many trails throughout the surrounding Mount Baker Foothills.

== Notable people ==
- Dennis Bakke, founder of AES Corporation and Imagine Schools, was born in Saxon.

== See also ==
- Acme, Washington
- Whatcom County, Washington
- List of unincorporated communities in Washington
