= Hoogdal =

Unincorporated community in Skagit County, Washington, USA

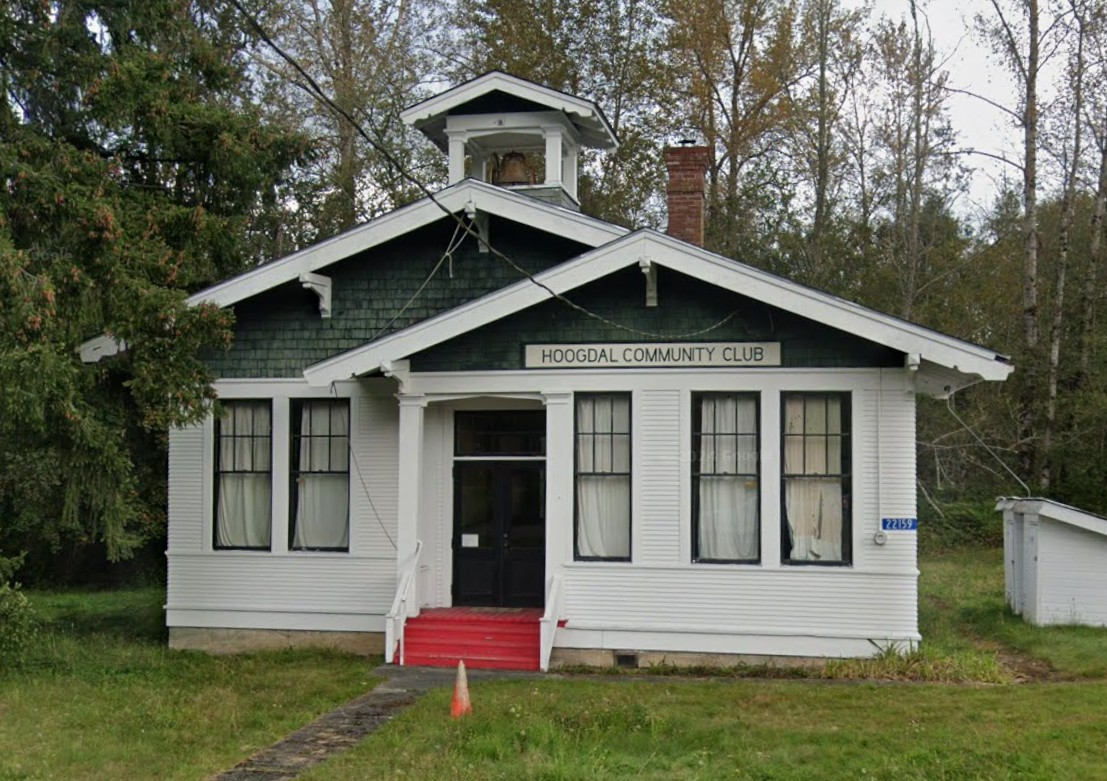
Hoogdal School, now the Hoogdal Community Club, in 2023.

Hoogdal is an unincorporated community in Skagit County, Washington. Hoogdal is serviced by the post office in Sedro-Woolley, about 2 miles south. The community has a 98284 zip code.

== History ==
Hoogdal was originally settled in 1909 when P.O. Ostlund, Jonas Johnson, Hans Hanson, and Halvor Pearson bought property in the area. Beginning in 1910, Ostlund, Johnson, Hanson, and John Grip building their dwellings in the community. Hanson is credited as being the first to build a home in the community.

When Hoogdal was first settled, there were no roads or reliable means to transport materials and goods into or out of the settlement. Access to the community was primarily over an old logging road that connected the new settlement with the nearby community of Hickson. In 1914, the Northern Pacific Railroad constructed a cutoff through Hoogdal, which became the primary means of transporting goods and people.

=== Hoogdal School ===
Before 1911, school-aged children in the Hoogdal community would have to travel 7 miles round-trip to the nearest school in the community of Belfast. From 1911 to 1914, children would walk 3 miles round-trip to the new school built in the nearby community of Hickson.

Between 1914 and 1916, Hanson built a second house, which was used as the community's school. In 1916, residents voted in favor of bonds to build a new school in the community. John Grip, a carpenter, was contracted to build the Hoogdal School and a gymnasium for $1,585.00. Grip provided the materials

No longer used as a school, the building is used by the Hoogdal Community Club. The Hoogdal School was listed in the National Register of Historic Places on October 11th, 2024.
