= East Selah, Washington =

Unincorporated community in Washington, United States

East Selah, Washington Black Rock
- Unincorporated community
- Location within Washington (state)
- Coordinates: 46°39′52″N 120°29′16″W
- Country: United States
- State: Washington
- County: Yakima
- Elevation: 1,122 ft (342 m)
- Time zone: UTC-8 (Pacific (PST))
  - Summer (DST): UTC-7 (PDT)
- ZIP code: 98901
- Area code: 509
- GNIS feature ID: 1510930

East Selah is an unincorporated community in Yakima County, Washington, United States, located east of Selah adjacent to the Yakima River.

== Climate ==
According to the Köppen Climate Classification system, East Selah has a semi-arid climate, abbreviated "BSk" on climate maps.
