= Ward, Washington =

Unincorporated community in Washington, United States

- Unincorporated community
- Location within Washington (state)
- Coordinates: 48°36′16″N 118°01′24″W
- Country: United States
- State: Washington
- County: Stevens
- Elevation: 1,620 ft (490 m)
- Time zone: UTC-8 (Pacific (PST))
  - Summer (DST): UTC-7 (PDT)
- ZIP code: 99141
- Area code: 509
- GNIS feature ID: 1531531

Ward is an unincorporated community in Stevens County, in the U.S. state of Washington. It is located a mile-and-a-half east of Kettle Falls on U.S. Route 395.

== History ==
A post office called Ward was established in 1904, and remained in operation until 1933. The community has the name of Thomas Ward.
