= Goose Prairie, Washington =

Unincorporated community in Washington, United States

- Unincorporated community
- Location within Yakima County Location within Washington (state)
- Coordinates: 46°53′42″N 121°16′01″W
- Country: United States
- State: Washington
- County: Yakima
- Elevation: 3,248 ft (990 m)
- Time zone: UTC-8 (Pacific (PST))
  - Summer (DST): UTC-7 (PDT)
- ZIP code: 98937
- Area code: 509
- GNIS feature ID: 1520150

Goose Prairie is an unincorporated community in Yakima County, Washington, United States. Goose Prairie is 41 miles (66 km) northwest of Yakima. It was founded by Tom Fife in 1886 who named it after a goose that visited the meadow one evening and stayed the night.

Fife donated a portion of his homestead to the Boy Scouts; the Grand Columbia council operates Camp Fife, a summer camp named in Fife's honor.

Besides the camp the meadow contains a number of cabins and a diner only open on summer holiday weekends.

Goose Prairie was the summer home of the 20th century United States Supreme Court Justice William O. Douglas. Eric Sevareid interviewed Douglas in Goose Prairie for the CBS Reports documentary Mr. Justice Douglas broadcast Sept. 6, 1972. The Yakima Valley Museum has a 16mm film of the program in its collection which can be viewed online.

It is also where Kay Kershaw and Isabelle Lynn operated the Double K Mountain Ranch; they played a key role in the designation of the nearby William O. Douglas Wilderness area.
