= Birdsview, Washington =

Unincorporated community in Washington, US

- Unincorporated community
- Location within Washington (state)
- Coordinates: 48°31′20″N 121°52′32″W
- Country: United States
- State: Washington
- County: Skagit
- Established: 1881
- Elevation: 154 ft (47 m)
- Time zone: UTC-8 (Pacific (PST))
  - Summer (DST): UTC-7 (PDT)
- Area code(s): 360, 564
- GNIS feature ID: 1516581

Birdsview is an unincorporated community in Skagit County, in the U.S. state of Washington.

== History ==
A post office called Birdsview was established in 1881, and remained in operation until 1934. The community was named for Birdsey "Bird" Minkler, an early postmaster.
