= Byron, Washington =

Unincorporated community in Washington, United States

- Unincorporated community
- Location within Yakima County Location within Washington (state)
- Coordinates: 46°11′18″N 119°52′41″W
- Country: United States
- State: Washington
- County: Yakima
- Elevation: 696 ft (212 m)
- Time zone: UTC-8 (Pacific (PST))
  - Summer (DST): UTC-7 (PDT)
- ZIP code: 98935
- Area code: 509
- GNIS feature ID: 1510854

Byron is an unincorporated community in Yakima County, Washington, United States, located approximately three miles west of Prosser.

== History ==
The community was founded in 1908 by the Byron Improvement Company. According to local settlers, the community was named after surveyors found a post marked 'Byron', which was sent in 1890 by the Northern Pacific Railway Company.

The railroad's records contain notes stating that Earl Byron, a sheep herder, had a railroad siding for loading sheep onto railroad cars, at the town location in 1881. Byron's post office was open from August 4, 1909, until January 31, 1955.

This is also the home of professional wrestler Byron Saxton.
