= Avon, Washington =

Unincorporated community in Washington, US

- Unincorporated community
- Location within Washington (state)
- Coordinates: 48°26′35″N 122°22′36″W
- Country: United States
- State: Washington
- County: Skagit
- Elevation: 30 ft (9.1 m)
- Time zone: UTC-8 (Pacific (PST))
  - Summer (DST): UTC-7 (PDT)
- Area code(s): 360, 564
- GNIS feature ID: 1515995

Avon, Washington is an unincorporated community in Skagit County, Washington, along the Skagit River. Its neighboring towns include Mount Vernon and Burlington. Local historians have speculated that Avon is named after Stratford-upon-Avon.

== History ==
The Avon area was developed as a waterfront town and logging and docking area on the West side of the Skagit River. The place of the original waterfront area is East of Bennett road and South of Avon St. Before 1879, two log jams East of Mount Vernon blocked the Skagit River further West. Along the docking area, Western Red cedar were cut down, harvested for shingle bolts. After the logging, the land was cleared and Avon became a town.

Avon was platted in 1883 by Arthur Henry Skaling. Early homesteaders of the area were Thomas McCain in 1876 and Charles Conrad in 1881. Skaling opened a store October 27, 1883, on land he purchased from W.H. Miller who had settled there the year before. According to early resident Ada Hall, W.H. Miller settled this property in 1874 and built the first house there. Soon Avon had a shingle mill, a post office, a boat builder, several stores, an implement company, a newspaper (The Avon Record), a restaurant, a hotel, a barber shop, stage line and two milliners.

Methodists organized a church in 1884, and built the present building dates to 1887 with Rev. Moore giving the dedicatory service. Rev. Vroman was the first regular preacher. The church was originally much closer to the river on the Eastern section of what is now called Avon St. It was moved around 1920 to its present location. By 1889 the population reached 500.

The Avon school was at the SW corner of Avon Allen road and Bennett road. It was built in 1892. The school's gymnasium structure stood on the site until July 2021. The property's owner had the gym's material scrapped for recycling. There was also an IOOF Hall built in 1891 and stood at the SE corner of the town, which is now where Bennett road makes a curve to the West. This building is no longer there.

In 1906, the Avon Post Office was closed and transferred to Mount Vernon. After the flooding of 1909 many of the waterfront buildings were moved away from the river to be protected by the newly constructed dike. As the importance of waterways for transportation and industry decreased, and the use of rail and autos increased, the waterfront town of Avon slowly ceased to be a town and became a quiet residential community. Few of the original buildings in Avon remain, except for a few homes built before 1900, and the Methodist church.
