= Milltown, Washington =

Unincorporated community in Washington, US

- Unincorporated community
- Location within Washington (state)
- Coordinates: 48°18′30″N 122°20′53″W
- Country: United States
- State: Washington
- County: Skagit
- Elevation: 7 ft (2.1 m)
- Time zone: UTC-8 (Pacific (PST))
  - Summer (DST): UTC-7 (PDT)
- Area code(s): 360, 564
- GNIS feature ID: 1511156

Milltown is a historic settlement and unincorporated community in Skagit County, in the U.S. state of Washington.
