= Home Valley, Washington =

Unincorporated community in Washington, United States

- Unincorporated community
- Location within Washington (state) Location within the United States
- Country: United States
- State: Washington
- County: Skamania
- Elevation: 79 ft (24 m)
- Time zone: UTC-8 (Pacific (PST))
  - Summer (DST): UTC-7 (PDT)
- GNIS feature ID: 1512308

Home Valley is an unincorporated community in the Columbia River Gorge National Scenic Area along the Columbia River in Skamania County, Washington, United States. The community is located on Washington State Route 14 and lies southeast of nearby Carson.

== History ==
The name "Home Valley" is a translation from the original Norwegian name "Heim Dal". A post office called Homevalley was in operation from 1892 until 1959.

== Parks and recreation ==
Home Valley is situated within the Columbia River Gorge National Scenic Area and outside the southern end of Gifford Pinchot National Forest, which contains the nearby highland terrain areas of Wind Mountain and Dog Mountain.

== See also ==
- List of unincorporated communities in Washington
