= Allen, Washington =

Unincorporated community in Washington, US

- Unincorporated community
- Location within Washington (state)
- Coordinates: 48°30′59.39″N 122°22′37.58″W
- Country: United States
- State: Washington
- County: Skagit
- Time zone: UTC-8 (Pacific (PST))
  - Summer (DST): UTC-7 (PDT)
- Area code(s): 360, 564
- GNIS feature ID: 1534146

Allen is an unincorporated community in Skagit County, in the U.S. state of Washington.

== History ==
A post office called Allen Rur. Sta. was established in 1959, and remained in operation until 1980.
