= Whitney, Washington =

Ghost town in Washington (state)

- Ghost town
- Location within Washington (state) Location within the United States
- Coordinates: 48°26′52″N 122°28′18″W
- Country: United States
- State: Washington
- County: Skagit
- Platted: 1882
- Time zone: UTC-8 (Pacific (PST))
  - Summer (DST): UTC-7 (PDT)

Whitney is an extinct town in Skagit County, in the U.S. state of Washington. The GNIS classifies it as a populated place.

Whitney was originally called Padilla, and under the latter name was platted in 1882. A post office called Padilla was established in 1885, and remained in operation until 1914.
