= Thornton, Washington =

Unincorporated community in Washington, United States

- Unincorporated community
- Location within Washington (state)
- Coordinates: 47°07′15″N 117°23′23″W
- Country: United States
- State: Washington
- County: Whitman
- Elevation: 2,310 ft (700 m)
- Time zone: UTC-8 (Pacific (PST))
  - Summer (DST): UTC-7 (PDT)
- ZIP code: 99176
- Area code: 509
- GNIS feature ID: 1509005

Thornton is an unincorporated community in Whitman County, Washington, United States. Founded in 1889 by P.M. Sheehan, Thornton is located near U.S. Route 195, 7 miles (11 km) west of Oakesdale. Thornton had a post office with ZIP code 99176.
