= Torboy, Washington =

- Census-designated place
- Location within Washington (state) Location within the United States
- Coordinates: 48°40′38″N 118°40′08″W
- Country: United States
- State: Washington
- County: Ferry

Area
  - Total: 0.95 sq mi (2.47 km^{2})
  - Land: 0.93 sq mi (2.40 km^{2})
  - Water: 0.027 sq mi (0.07 km^{2})
- Elevation: 2,389 ft (728 m)

Population (2010)
  - Total: 49
  - Density: 53/sq mi (20.4/km^{2})
- Time zone: Pacific
- ZIP Code: 99166
- Area code(s): 360, 564
- GNIS feature ID: 2631209

Torboy is a census-designated place in Ferry County, Washington, United States. As of the 2020 census, Torboy had a population of 43.

== Demographics ==
Historical population
Census	Pop.	Note	%±
2010	49		—
2020	43		−12.2%
U.S. Decennial Census; 2000 2010

Torboy first appeared as a census designated place in the 2010 U.S. census.

=== Racial and ethnic composition ===
Torboy CDP, Washington – Racial and ethnic composition Note: the US Census treats Hispanic/Latino as an ethnic category. This table excludes Latinos from the racial categories and assigns them to a separate category. Hispanics/Latinos may be of any race.
Race / Ethnicity (NH = Non-Hispanic)	Pop 2010	Pop 2020	% 2010	% 2020
White alone (NH)	46	38	93.88%	88.37%
Black or African American alone (NH)	0	0	0.00%	0.00%
Native American or Alaska Native alone (NH)	2	0	4.08%	0.00%
Asian alone (NH)	0	0	0.00%	0.00%
Native Hawaiian or Pacific Islander alone (NH)	0	1	0.00%	2.33%
Other race alone (NH)	0	0	0.00%	0.00%
Mixed race or Multiracial (NH)	1	3	2.04%	6.98%
Hispanic or Latino (any race)	0	1	0.00%	2.33%
Total	49	43	100.00%	100.00%

In 2010, it had a population of 49. The census reported that 28 of the inhabitants were male, and 21 were female.

== Geography ==
Torboy is located in northwestern Ferry County along Washington State Route 21. It is 5 miles (8 km) northeast of Republic, the county seat, and 16 miles (26 km) south of Curlew. The community is bordered to the north by the Curlew Lake CDP.

According to the U.S. Census Bureau, the Torboy CDP has a total area of 0.97 square miles (2.5 km^{2}), of which 0.03 square miles (0.07 km^{2}), or 2.90%, is water. The Sanpoil River flows through the community.
