= Agate, Washington =

Coordinates: 47°12′48″N 123°00′45″W

Agate is a small community in the state of Washington, United States. It is located on southern Puget Sound on the north side of the entrance to Hammersley Inlet.
