= Yakima County, Washington =

County in Washington, United States

- County
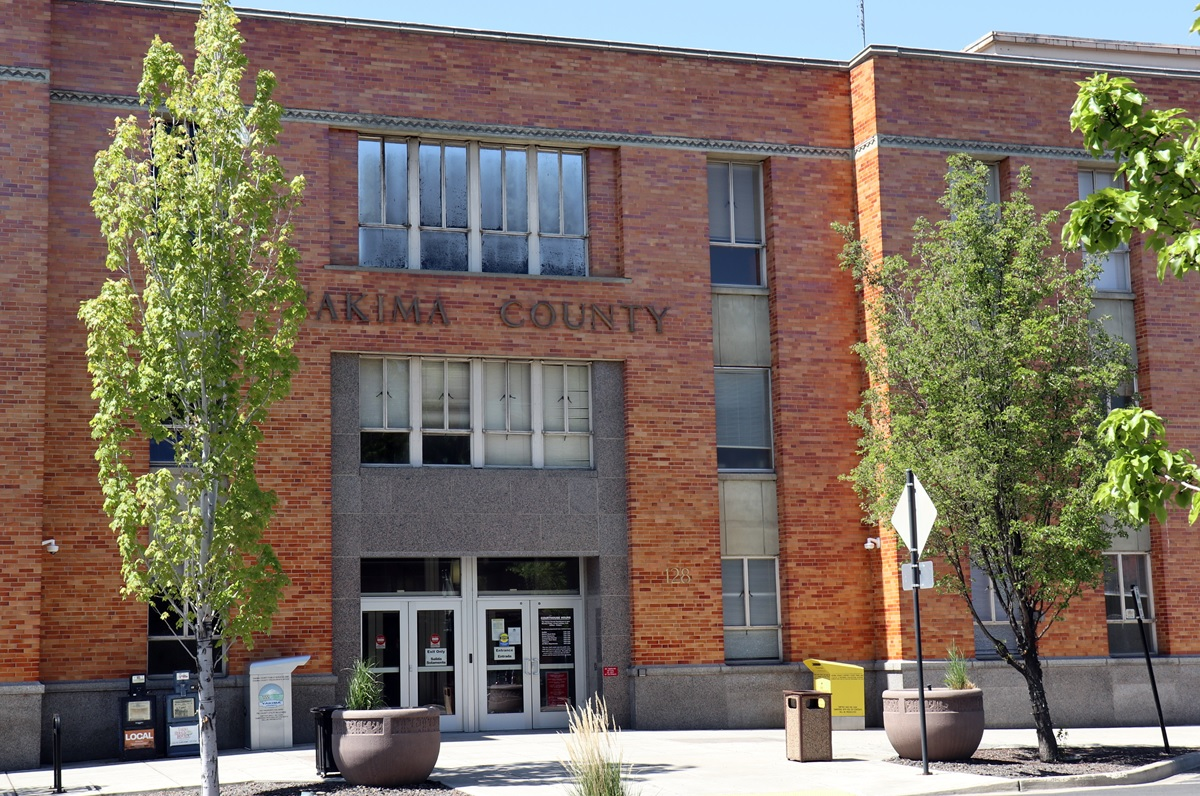
- Yakima County Courthouse

- Location within the U.S. state of Washington
- Coordinates: 46°28′N 120°44′W
- Country: United States
- State: Washington
- Founded: January 21, 1865
- Named for: Yakama Nation
- Seat: Yakima
- Largest city: Yakima

Area
  - Total: 4,311 sq mi (11,170 km^{2})
  - Land: 4,295 sq mi (11,120 km^{2})
  - Water: 16 sq mi (41 km^{2}) 0.4%

Population (2020)
  - Total: 256,728
  - Estimate (2025): 259,185 ▲
  - Density: 58/sq mi (22/km^{2})
- Time zone: UTC−8 (Pacific)
  - Summer (DST): UTC−7 (PDT)
- Congressional district: 4th
- Website: www.yakimacounty.us

Yakima County is a county in the U.S. state of Washington. As of the 2020 census, its population was 256,728. The county seat and most populous city is Yakima. The county was formed out of Ferguson County in January 1865 and is named for the Yakama tribe of Native Americans.

Yakima County comprises the Yakima, WA Metropolitan Statistical Area and is Washington state's most populous majority-Hispanic county as of 2020.

== History ==
The area that now comprises Yakima County was part of the Oregon Country at the start of the nineteenth century, inhabited both by fur prospectors from Canada, and Americans seeking land for agricultural and mineral-extraction opportunities. Unable to resolve which country should control this vast area, the Treaty of 1818 provided for joint control. By 1843, the Provisional Government of Oregon had been established, although at first there were questions as to its authority and extent. During its existence, that provisional government formed the area north of the Columbia River first into the Washington Territory, and then (December 19, 1845) into two vast counties: Clark and Lewis.

The Washington Territory was formed as a separate governing entity in 1853. In 1854, that legislature carved several counties out of the two original large counties, including Skamania County. Later in 1854 the new Skamania County was reduced in size by carving out Walla Walla County. This arrangement lasted until January 23, 1863, when Ferguson County was carved out of Walla Walla County. However, the Ferguson County government and boundary was dissolved on January 18, 1865, and its area was assigned to Yakima County three days later.

Since its creation, the Yakima County boundary has been altered two times. In 1883 a portion of its area was carved off in the creation of Kittitas County, and in 1905 a further reduction added to the creation of Benton County.

The Yakama Indian Reservation was created in 1855. However, several tribes felt the agreement creating this reserved area had been completed without sufficient native input, and skirmishes and local war (the Yakima War, which lasted until 1858) meant that the reservation was not fully operational for two decades. The Reservation is the 15th-largest reservation in America, covering 1,573 mi^{2} (4,070 km^{2}), and comprising 36% of the county's total area. Its population was 31,799 in 2000, and its largest city is Toppenish.

== Geography ==
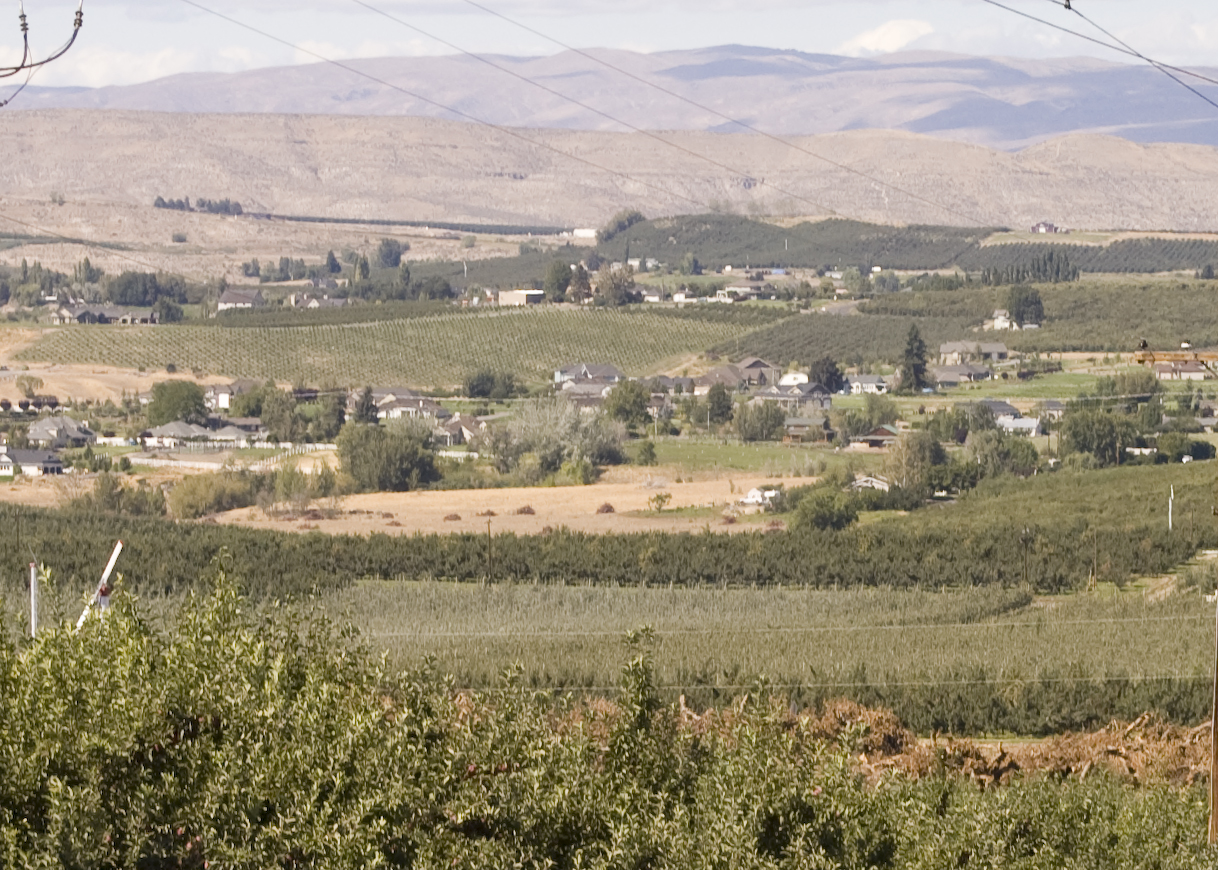
Orchards near Selah

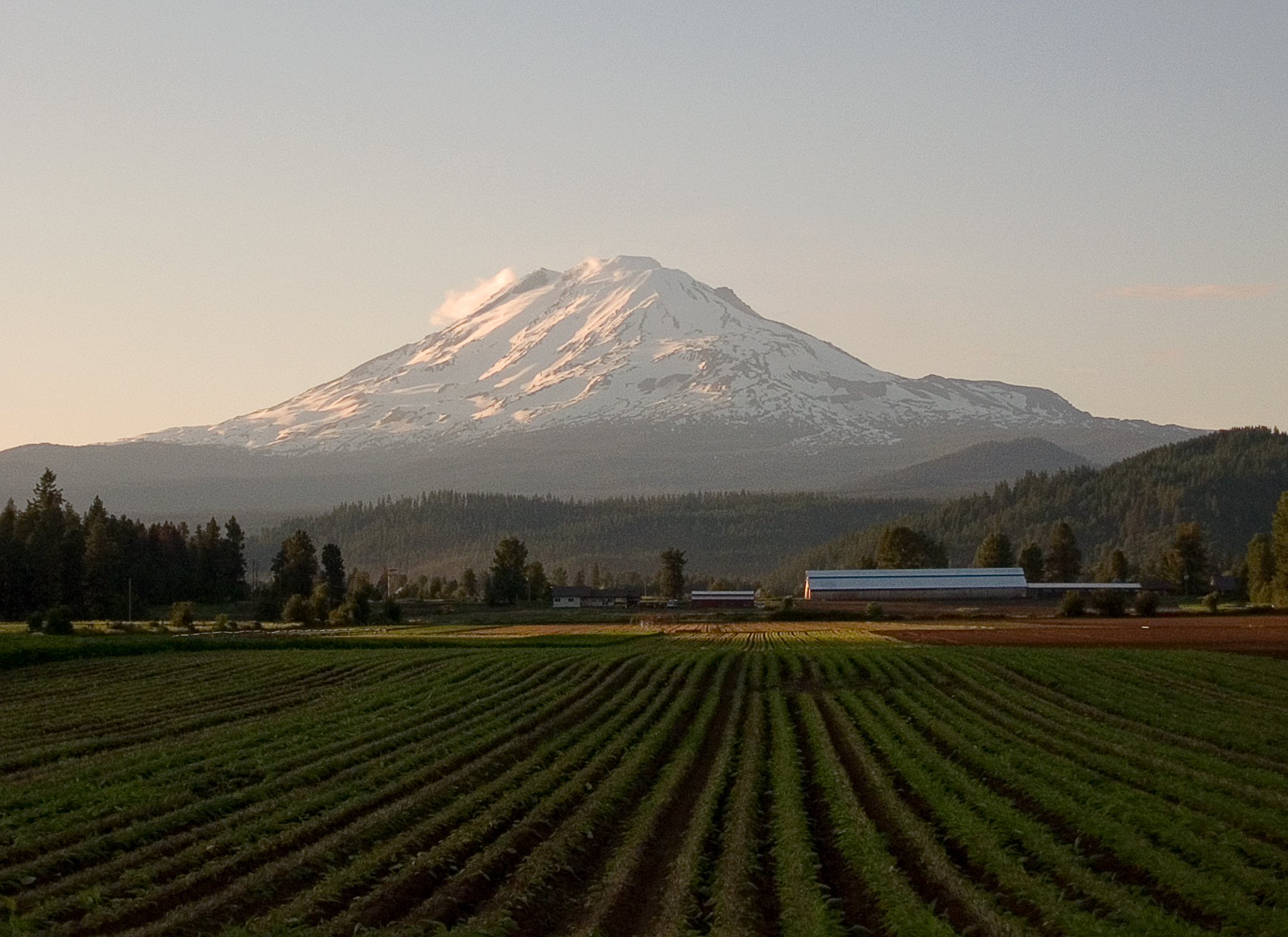
Mount Adams, highest point in Yakima County

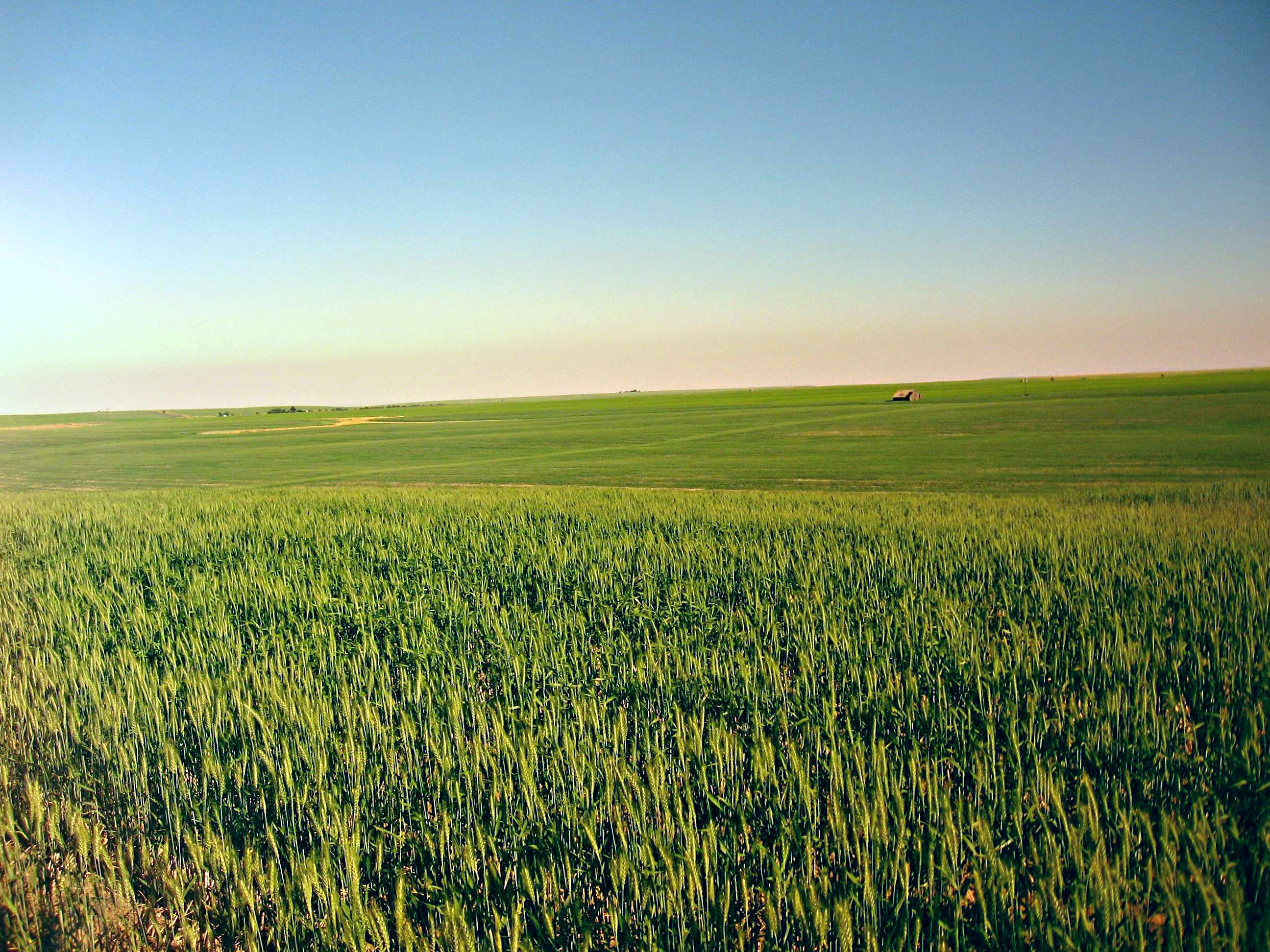
Southeastern Yakima County's vast farmlands

According to the United States Census Bureau, the county has a total area of 4,311 square miles (11,170 km^{2}), of which 4,295 square miles (11,120 km^{2}) is land and 16 square miles (41 km^{2}) (0.4%) is water. Yakima County is the second-largest county in Washington by land area and third-largest by total area. Yakima County is reputed to be one of the most difficult places on earth of which to predict the weather, owing to its surrounding mountains. The county's area is larger than the states of Delaware and Rhode Island combined. The highest point in the county is Mount Adams, which is the second-tallest peak in Washington and the third-tallest in the Cascade Range.

=== Geographic features ===
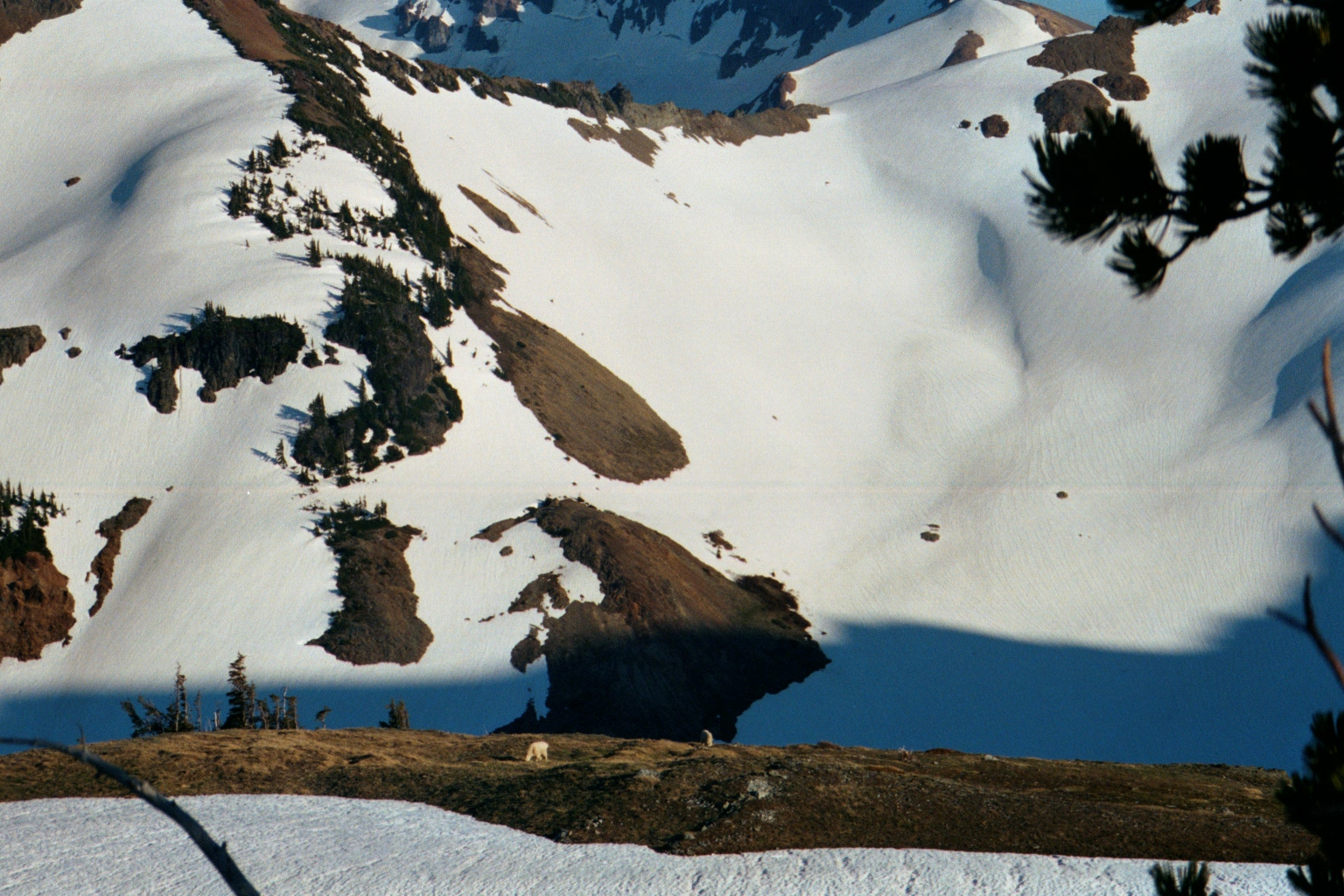
Mountain Goats near the glaciers of Goat Rocks Wilderness

- Mount Adams, 12,281 feet (3,743 m)
- Gilbert Peak, 8,184 feet (2,494 m)
- Mount Aix, 7,766 feet (2,367 m)
- Tieton Peak, 7,768 feet (2,368 m)
- Cascade Mountains
- Rattlesnake Hills
- Horse Heaven Hills

=== Major rivers ===
- Yakima River
- Columbia River
- Naches River
- Tieton River
- Bumping River
- American River

=== National protected areas ===
- Wenatchee National Forest (part)
- Gifford Pinchot National Forest (part)
- Snoqualmie National Forest (part)
- Goat Rocks Wilderness
- Mount Adams Wilderness (part)
- Norse Peak Wilderness (part)
- William O. Douglas Wilderness
- Toppenish National Wildlife Refuge

=== Major highways ===
- Interstate 82
- U.S. Route 12
- U.S. Route 97
- SR 22
- SR 24
- SR 168
- SR 220
- SR 223
- SR 241
- SR 410
- SR 821
- SR 823

=== Adjacent counties ===
- Pierce County - northwest
- Lewis County - west
- Skamania County - southwest
- Kittitas County - north
- Klickitat County - south
- Grant County - northeast
- Benton County - east

== Demographics ==
Historical population
Census	Pop.	Note	%±
1870	432		—
1880	2,811		550.7%
1890	4,429		57.6%
1900	13,462		204.0%
1910	41,709		209.8%
1920	63,710		52.7%
1930	77,402		21.5%
1940	99,019		27.9%
1950	135,723		37.1%
1960	145,112		6.9%
1970	144,971		−0.1%
1980	172,508		19.0%
1990	188,823		9.5%
2000	222,581		17.9%
2010	243,231		9.3%
2020	256,728		5.5%
2025 (est.)	259,185	▲	1.0%
U.S. Decennial Census; 1790–1960 1900–1990; 1990–2000 2010–2020

=== Racial and ethnic composition ===
Yakima County, Washington – Racial and ethnic composition Note: the US Census treats Hispanic/Latino as an ethnic category. This table excludes Latinos from the racial categories and assigns them to a separate category. Hispanics/Latinos may be of any race.
Race / Ethnicity (NH = Non-Hispanic)	Pop 1980	Pop 1990	Pop 2000	Pop 2010	Pop 2020	% 1980	% 1990	% 2000	% 2010	% 2020
White alone (NH)	137,380	132,147	125,733	116,024	103,578	79.64%	69.98%	56.49%	47.70%	40.35%
Black or African American alone (NH)	1,558	1,785	1,842	1,743	1,718	0.90%	0.95%	0.83%	0.72%	0.67%
Native American or Alaska Native alone (NH)	6,656	7,695	8,947	9,072	9,357	3.86%	4.08%	4.02%	3.73%	3.64%
Asian alone (NH)	1,233	1,667	1,957	2,359	2,785	0.71%	0.88%	0.88%	0.97%	1.08%
Native Hawaiian or Pacific Islander alone (NH)	x	x	109	142	221	x	x	0.05%	0.06%	0.09%
Other race alone (NH)	226	415	215	331	1,045	0.13%	0.22%	0.10%	0.14%	0.41%
Mixed race or Multiracial (NH)	x	x	3,873	4,090	7,975	x	x	1.74%	1.68%	3.11%
Hispanic or Latino (any race)	25,455	45,114	79,905	109,470	130,049	14.76%	23.89%	35.90%	45.01%	50.66%
Total	172,508	188,823	222,581	243,231	256,728	100.00%	100.00%	100.00%	100.00%	100.00%

Yakima county reached majority minority status in the 2010 U.S. census and majority Hispanic in the 2020 U.S. census.

=== 2020 census ===
As of the 2020 census, the county had a population of 256,728. Of the residents, 28.2% were under the age of 18 and 14.6% were 65 years of age or older; the median age was 34.2 years. For every 100 females there were 99.5 males, and for every 100 females age 18 and over there were 97.6 males. 69.6% of residents lived in urban areas and 30.4% lived in rural areas.

The racial makeup of the county was 48.5% White, 0.8% Black or African American, 5.1% American Indian and Alaska Native, 1.2% Asian, 0.1% Native Hawaiian and Pacific Islander, 29.2% from some other race, and 15.1% from two or more races. Hispanic or Latino residents of any race comprised 50.7% of the population.

There were 85,882 households in the county, of which 39.5% had children under the age of 18 living with them and 25.7% had a female householder with no spouse or partner present. About 22.0% of all households were made up of individuals and 10.2% had someone living alone who was 65 years of age or older.

There were 90,504 housing units, of which 5.1% were vacant. Among occupied housing units, 62.5% were owner-occupied and 37.5% were renter-occupied. The homeowner vacancy rate was 0.9% and the rental vacancy rate was 4.0%.

=== 2010 census ===
As of the 2010 census, there were 243,231 people, 80,592 households, and 58,790 families living in the county. The population density was 56.6 people per square mile (21.9 people/km^{2}). There were 85,474 housing units at an average density of 19.9 units per square mile (7.7 units/km^{2}). The racial makeup of the county was 63.7% White, 4.3% American Indian, 1.1% Asian, 1.0% Black or African American, 0.1% Pacific islander, 26.1% from other races, and 3.7% from two or more races. Those of Hispanic or Latino origin made up 45.0% of the population. In terms of ethnicity, 15.8% reported German, 8.0% English, 7.3% Irish, and 3.6% American ancestry.

Of the 80,592 households, 42.1% had children under the age of 18 living with them, 51.4% were married couples living together, 14.7% had a female householder with no husband present, 27.1% were non-families, and 21.6% of all households were made up of individuals. The average household size was 2.97 and the average family size was 3.46. The median age was 32.2 years.

The median income for a household in the county was $42,877 and the median income for a family was $48,004. Males had a median income of $37,029 versus $29,824 for females. The per capita income for the county was $19,325. About 16.8% of families and 21.8% of the population were below the poverty line, including 31.9% of those under age 18 and 11.9% of those age 65 or over.

=== 2000 census ===
As of the 2000 census, there were 222,581 people, 73,993 households, and 54,606 families living in the county. The population density was 52 people per square mile (20 people/km^{2}). There were 79,174 housing units at an average density of 18 units per square mile (6.9 units/km^{2}). The racial makeup of the county was 65.60% White, 0.97% Black or African American, 4.48% Native American, 0.95% Asian, 0.09% Pacific Islander, 24.43% from other races, and 3.48% from two or more races. 35.90% of the population were Hispanic or Latino of any race. 13.2% were of German, 6.4% United States or American, 5.9% English and 5.4% Irish ancestry.

There were 73,993 households, out of which 39.7% had children under the age of 18 living with them, 55.8% were married couples living together, 12.5% had a female householder with no husband present, and 26.2% were non-families. 21.5% of all households were made up of individuals, and 9.6% had someone living alone who was 65 years of age or older. The average household size was 2.96 and the average family size was 3.44.

In the county, 31.8% of the population was under the age of 18, 9.8% was from 18 to 24, 27.5% from 25 to 44, 19.7% from 45 to 64, and 11.2% was 65 years of age or older. The median age was 31 years. For every 100 females there were 99.6 males. For every 100 females age 18 and over, there were 97.1 males.

The median income for a household in the county was $34,828, and the median income for a family was $39,746. Males had a median income of $31,620 versus $24,541 for females. The per capita income for the county was $15,606. About 14.8% of families and 19.7% of the population were below the poverty line, including 27.2% of those under age 18 and 11.3% of those age 65 or over.

== Economy ==
At the last census, the county harvested 1,027 acres (416 ha) of potato (Solanum tuberosum).

The northeastern corner of the county is part of the U.S. Army's Yakima Training Center.

=== Wine regions ===
Washington ranks second in the United States in the production of wine, behind only California. The Yakima Valley AVA was established in 1983 in the state's oldest agricultural region. It is Washington's third largest officially designated American Viticultural Area (AVA), and is responsible for more than 40% of the state's wine production.

Located within the larger Columbia Valley AVA, the Yakima Valley AVA is sub-divided into the three smaller wine regions, each with distinctive growing conditions. They are Red Mountain AVA, Snipes Mountain AVA, and Rattlesnake Hills AVA. Of the viticultural region's 665,000 acres (269,000 ha), nearly 11,120 acres (4,500 ha) were planted in 2008.

=== Pests ===
Common agricultural pests here include the Green Peach Aphid (Myzus persicae), the Spotted Cutworm (Xestia c-nigrum), and the Beet Leafhopper (Circulifer tenellus) in potato.

== Communities ==
=== Cities ===
- Grandview
- Granger
- Mabton
- Moxee
- Selah
- Sunnyside
- Tieton
- Toppenish
- Union Gap
- Wapato
- Yakima (county seat)
- Zillah

=== Towns ===
- Harrah
- Naches

=== Census-designated places ===
- Ahtanum
- Buena
- Cliffdell
- Cowiche
- Donald
- Eschbach
- Gleed
- Nile
- Outlook
- Parker
- Summitview
- Tampico
- Terrace Heights
- White Swan

=== Unincorporated communities ===
- Brownstown
- Byron
- East Selah
- Fruitvale
- Goose Prairie
- Gromore
- Satus
- Pomona
- West Valley
- Wiley City

== Politics ==
Yakima County leans Republican in statewide elections. On only four occasions has it backed a Democrat for President – it has voted for the same candidate as the state of South Dakota in every election since they first voted for President – and the last Democratic gubernatorial candidate it backed was Albert D. Rosellini in 1956.

Only Adams County and Columbia County, which last backed a Democrat for governor in 1936 when Clarence D. Martin swept every county in the state, have consistently backed Republicans for governor for longer. Although Yakima County did narrowly support Maria Cantwell in 2012, the previous U.S. Senate candidate to carry Yakima County for the Democrats was popular Senator "Scoop" Jackson in 1982.

United States presidential election results for Yakima County, Washington
Year	Republican		Democratic		Third party(ies)	
Year	No.	%	No.	%	No.	%
1892	625	41.47%	498	33.05%	384	25.48%
1896	948	42.57%	1,266	56.85%	13	0.58%
1900	1,507	55.90%	1,066	39.54%	123	4.56%
1904	3,484	70.36%	929	18.76%	539	10.88%
1908	3,998	63.86%	1,650	26.35%	613	9.79%
1912	3,304	25.21%	3,209	24.49%	6,592	50.30%
1916	7,188	49.10%	6,136	41.91%	1,316	8.99%
1920	11,571	59.39%	4,062	20.85%	3,851	19.76%
1924	12,124	63.72%	2,157	11.34%	4,747	24.95%
1928	16,694	73.07%	6,008	26.30%	146	0.64%
1932	11,151	41.54%	13,880	51.70%	1,815	6.76%
1936	12,555	39.66%	17,200	54.33%	1,902	6.01%
1940	20,398	52.63%	18,092	46.68%	270	0.70%
1944	20,864	56.76%	15,643	42.56%	249	0.68%
1948	21,396	51.00%	19,760	47.10%	801	1.91%
1952	32,317	64.06%	17,647	34.98%	483	0.96%
1956	31,984	60.21%	20,991	39.51%	149	0.28%
1960	31,683	58.68%	21,958	40.67%	354	0.66%
1964	22,786	43.21%	29,604	56.14%	340	0.64%
1968	27,488	53.69%	19,499	38.09%	4,211	8.22%
1972	32,240	58.93%	19,729	36.06%	2,736	5.00%
1976	29,478	53.12%	24,223	43.65%	1,791	3.23%
1980	33,815	55.21%	21,873	35.71%	5,565	9.09%
1984	40,678	61.46%	24,724	37.36%	780	1.18%
1988	30,026	55.70%	23,221	43.07%	663	1.23%
1992	25,841	44.58%	21,026	36.27%	11,102	19.15%
1996	27,668	46.61%	25,676	43.25%	6,016	10.13%
2000	39,494	58.68%	25,546	37.96%	2,259	3.36%
2004	43,352	59.56%	28,474	39.12%	964	1.32%
2008	41,946	54.43%	33,792	43.85%	1,324	1.72%
2012	42,239	54.88%	33,217	43.15%	1,517	1.97%
2016	41,735	52.34%	31,291	39.24%	6,715	8.42%
2020	50,555	52.56%	43,179	44.89%	2,459	2.56%
2024	49,368	55.63%	36,706	41.36%	2,677	3.02%

== See also ==
- National Register of Historic Places listings in Yakima County, Washington
