= Brownstown, Washington =

Unincorporated community in Washington, United States

- Unincorporated community
- Location within Yakima County Location within Washington (state)
- Coordinates: 46°24′15″N 120°36′25″W
- Country: United States
- State: Washington
- County: Yakima
- Elevation: 853 ft (260 m)
- Time zone: UTC-8 (Pacific (PST))
  - Summer (DST): UTC-7 (PDT)
- ZIP code: 98920
- Area code: 509
- GNIS feature ID: 1512039

Brownstown is an unincorporated community in Yakima County, Washington, United States. Brownstown is 3 miles (4.8 km) west of Harrah. Brownstown has a post office with ZIP code 98920.

It is a loosely-knit farming community within the Yakama Nation Reservation approximately halfway between Wapato and White Swan. USPS Post Office for Brownstown is at the intersection of Branch Road with Brownstown Road.
