= Mountain View, Washington =

Unincorporated community in Washington, US

- Unincorporated community
- Location within Washington (state)
- Coordinates: 48°50′53″N 122°40′25″W
- Country: United States
- State: Washington
- County: Whatcom
- Established: 1891
- Elevation: 220 ft (67 m)
- Time zone: UTC-8 (Pacific (PST))
  - Summer (DST): UTC-7 (PDT)
- Area code(s): 360, 564
- GNIS feature ID: 1512487

Mountain View is an unincorporated community in Whatcom County, in the U.S. state of Washington.

== History ==
The community was named by Mrs. H. A. Smith, a settler in 1877, for the location's view of Mount Baker, Mount Shuksan, and the Twin Sisters.

A post office called Mountain View was established on October 10, 1891 with Mina Miller as the first postmaster, and remained in operation until December 12, 1908. Starting in 1909 mail was routed through Ferndale. On the post office's application form in 1891, it listed the population as 180.
