= Stillwater, Washington =

Unincorporated community in Washington, US

- Unincorporated community
- Location in Washington and the United States Stillwater (the United States)
- Coordinates: 47°40′58″N 121°55′12″W
- Country: United States
- State: Washington
- County: King
- Elevation: 79 ft (24 m)
- Time zone: UTC-8 (Pacific (PST))
  - Summer (DST): UTC-7 (PDT)
- Area code: 360
- GNIS feature ID: 1511337

Stillwater is an unincorporated community in King County, in the U.S. state of Washington.

== History ==
A post office called Stillwater was established in 1910, and remained in operation until 1925. The community was named after Stillwater, Minnesota, the native home of a large share of local loggers.
