= Pomona, Washington =

Unincorporated community in Washington, United States

- Unincorporated community
- Location within Washington (state)
- Coordinates: 46°41′25″N 120°29′14″W
- Country: United States
- State: Washington
- County: Yakima
- Elevation: 1,161 ft (354 m)
- Time zone: UTC-8 (Pacific (PST))
  - Summer (DST): UTC-7 (PDT)
- ZIP code: 98901
- Area code: 509
- GNIS feature ID: 1511235

Pomona is an unincorporated community in Yakima County, Washington, United States, located immediately northeast of Selah.

In 1885 the train station on the Northern Pacific Railway was called Selah. The name was changed to Pomona in 1908 because the Wenas station was commonly called Selah. Edmund Stevens, an agent for the Northern Pacific Railway, suggested the name Pomona in honor of the mythical Roman patron goddess of gardens and fruits.
