= Donald, Washington =

Unincorporated community in Washington, United States

- Unincorporated community & CDP
- Location within Yakima County Location within Washington (state)
- Coordinates: 46°28′05″N 120°23′10″W
- Country: United States
- State: Washington
- County: Yakima
- Elevation: 869 ft (265 m)

Population (2010)
  - Total: 91
- Time zone: UTC-8 (Pacific (PST))
  - Summer (DST): UTC-7 (PDT)
- ZIP code: 98951
- Area code: 509
- FIPS code: 53-18265
- GNIS feature ID: 2584968

Donald is a census-designated place and unincorporated community in Yakima County, Washington, United States. As of the 2020 census, Donald had a population of 172.

Donald was founded in 1910 and was named after George Donald, an early railroad pioneer and the president of the North Yakima and Valley Railway Company. The town site, primarily a rural railroad junction, was acquired from George Donald by the railroad. Donald is located near the city of Wapato and is largely an agricultural community.

== Demographics ==
Historical population
Census	Pop.	Note	%±
2010	91		—
2020	172		89.0%
U.S. Decennial Census; 2000 2010

Donald first appeared as a census designated place in the 2010 U.S. census.

=== Racial and ethnic composition ===
Donald CDP, Washington – Racial and ethnic composition Note: the US Census treats Hispanic/Latino as an ethnic category. This table excludes Latinos from the racial categories and assigns them to a separate category. Hispanics/Latinos may be of any race.
Race / Ethnicity (NH = Non-Hispanic)	Pop 2010	Pop 2020	% 2010	% 2020
White alone (NH)	46	63	50.55%	36.63%
Black or African American alone (NH)	0	1	0.00%	0.58%
Native American or Alaska Native alone (NH)	5	6	5.49%	3.49%
Asian alone (NH)	5	1	5.49%	0.58%
Native Hawaiian or Pacific Islander alone (NH)	0	0	0.00%	0.00%
Other race alone (NH)	0	2	0.00%	1.16%
Mixed race or Multiracial (NH)	2	12	2.20%	6.98%
Hispanic or Latino (any race)	33	87	36.26%	50.58%
Total	91	172	100.00%	100.00%
