= Fortson, Washington =

- Unincorporated community
- Location within Washington (state)
- Coordinates: 48°16′06″N 121°43′38″W
- Country: United States
- State: Washington
- County: Snohomish
- Elevation: 472 ft (144 m)
- Time zone: UTC-8 (Pacific (PST))
  - Summer (DST): UTC-7 (PDT)
- Area code: 425
- GNIS feature ID: 1519707

Fortson is an unincorporated community in Snohomish County, Washington, United States.
