= Van Horn, Washington =

Unincorporated community in Washington, US

- Unincorporated community
- Location within Washington (state)
- Coordinates: 48°30′59″N 121°42′19″W
- Country: United States
- State: Washington
- County: Skagit
- Established: 1901
- Elevation: 243 ft (74 m)
- Time zone: UTC-8 (Pacific (PST))
  - Summer (DST): UTC-7 (PDT)
- Area code(s): 360, 564
- GNIS feature ID: 1527669

Van Horn is an unincorporated community in Skagit County, in the U.S. state of Washington.

== History ==
A post office called Van Horn was established in 1901, and remained in operation until 1925. The community was named after James V. Van Horn, a first settler.
