= Wymer, Washington =

Unincorporated community in Washington, US

- Unincorporated community
- Location within Washington (state) Location within the United States
- Coordinates: 46°49′33.46″N 120°27′35.24″W
- Country: United States
- State: Washington
- County: Kittitas
- Time zone: UTC-8 (Pacific (PST))
  - Summer (DST): UTC-7 (PDT)
- Area code: 509
- GNIS feature ID: 1511440

Wymer is an unincorporated community in Kittitas County, in the U.S. state of Washington.

== History ==
A post office called Wymer was established in 1912, and remained in operation until 1938.
