= Chester, Washington =

Unincorporated community in Washington, United States

Chester
- Unincorporated community
- Location within the state of Washington
- Coordinates: 47°37′4.62″N 117°15′1.74″W
- Country: United States
- State: Washington
- County: Spokane
- Time zone: UTC-8 (Pacific (PST))
  - Summer (DST): UTC-7 (PDT)
- GNIS feature ID: 1503945

Chester is an unincorporated community in Spokane County, Washington, United States. Chester has two post offices.
