= Gromore, Washington =

Unincorporated community in Washington, United States

- Unincorporated community
- Location within Yakima County Location within Washington (state)
- Coordinates: 46°35′18″N 120°41′53″W
- Country: United States
- State: Washington
- County: Yakima
- Elevation: 1,417 ft (432 m)
- Time zone: UTC-8 (Pacific (PST))
  - Summer (DST): UTC-7 (PDT)
- ZIP code: 98908
- Area code: 509
- GNIS feature ID: 1512259

Gromore is an unincorporated community in Yakima County, Washington, United States, located approximately one mile west of Yakima. Gromore was an agricultural area located at the terminus of a Yakima Valley Transportation Company interurban line.
