= Parker, Washington =

Unincorporated community in Washington, United States

- Unincorporated community & CDP
- Location within Yakima County Location within Washington (state)
- Coordinates: 46°30′05″N 120°27′57″W
- Country: United States
- State: Washington
- County: Yakima
- Elevation: 929 ft (283 m)

Population (2010)
  - Total: 154
- Time zone: UTC-8 (Pacific (PST))
  - Summer (DST): UTC-7 (PDT)
- ZIP code: 98939
- Area code: 509
- FIPS code: 53-53265
- GNIS feature ID: 2585018

Parker is a census-designated place and unincorporated community in central Yakima County, Washington, United States. It is located on U.S. Route 97 between the cities of Union Gap and Wapato on the Yakama Indian Reservation. As of the 2020 census, Parker had a population of 158.

== History ==
The first plat for the town of Parker was filed January 6, 1909. It was originally settled by William Parker in 1864, and was named for him by the Northern Pacific Railway in 1890.

Parker does not have any form of city government. Police service is delivered by the Yakima County Sheriffs department, and a local volunteer fire station is present. The U.S. Postal Service provides post office box delivery on weekdays and Saturday. The ZIP code for Parker, Washington is 98939. Currently, children attend Wapato public schools in the Wapato School District approximately four miles southeast of town.

Businesses include a wood cutting businesses, Nickoloffs Fruit Stand, and a fireworks stand that is open during the Fourth of July and New Years holiday seasons.

Local residents are primarily employed in occupations related to agriculture and fruit orchards.

== Climate ==
This region experiences warm (but not hot) and dry summers, with no average monthly temperatures above 71.6 °F. According to the Köppen Climate Classification system, Parker has a warm-summer Mediterranean climate, abbreviated "Csb" on climate maps. Parker, Washington temperatures get well into the 80s and 90s for most of July and August, with some days into the low 100s.

== Demographics ==
Historical population
Census	Pop.	Note	%±
2010	154		—
2020	158		2.6%
U.S. Decennial Census; 2000 2010

Parker first appeared as a census designated place in the 2010 U.S. census.

=== Racial and ethnic composition ===
Parker CDP, Washington – Racial and ethnic composition Note: the US Census treats Hispanic/Latino as an ethnic category. This table excludes Latinos from the racial categories and assigns them to a separate category. Hispanics/Latinos may be of any race.
Race / Ethnicity (NH = Non-Hispanic)	Pop 2010	Pop 2020	% 2010	% 2020
White alone (NH)	71	43	46.10%	27.22%
Black or African American alone (NH)	0	2	0.00%	1.27%
Native American or Alaska Native alone (NH)	16	17	10.39%	10.76%
Asian alone (NH)	5	0	3.25%	0.00%
Native Hawaiian or Pacific Islander alone (NH)	0	0	0.00%	0.00%
Other race alone (NH)	0	1	0.00%	0.63%
Mixed race or Multiracial (NH)	1	6	0.65%	3.80%
Hispanic or Latino (any race)	61	89	39.61%	56.33%
Total	154	158	100.00%	100.00%
