= Robe, Washington =

Unincorporated community in Washington, United States

- Unincorporated community
- Location within Washington (state) Location within the United States
- Coordinates: 48°05′50″N 121°48′48″W
- Country: United States
- State: Washington
- County: Snohomish
- Time zone: UTC-8 (Pacific (PST))
  - Summer (DST): UTC-7 (PDT)

Robe is an unincorporated community in Snohomish County, in the U.S. state of Washington.

== History ==
A post office called Robe was established in 1894, and remained in operation until 1954. The community bears the name of a local pioneer.
