= Cherokee, Washington =

Unincorporated community in Washington, United States

- Unincorporated community
- Location within Washington (state)
- Coordinates: 48°27′2.55″N 119°27′59.17″W
- Country: United States
- State: Washington
- County: Okanogan
- Elevation: 1,414 ft (431 m)
- Time zone: UTC-8 (Pacific (PST))
  - Summer (DST): UTC-7 (PDT)
- Area code: 509
- GNIS feature ID: 1517660

Cherokee is an unincorporated community in Okanogan County, Washington State, United States. Cherokee had two post offices.
