= Port Williams, Washington =

Unincorporated community in Washington, United States

- Unincorporated community
- Location within Washington (state) Location within the United States
- Coordinates: 48°05′48″N 123°02′45″W
- Country: United States
- State: Washington
- County: Clallam
- Established: 1890
- Elevation: 0 ft (0 m)
- Time zone: UTC-8 (Pacific (PST))
  - Summer (DST): UTC-7 (PDT)
- GNIS feature ID: 1524590

Port Williams is an unincorporated community in Clallam County, in the U.S. state of Washington.

== History ==
A post office called Port Williams was established in 1890, and remained in operation until 1919. The community bears the name of an original land developer.
