= Puget, Washington =

- Unincorporated community
- Location within Washington (state) Location within the United States
- Coordinates: 47°08′47″N 122°47′37″W
- Country: United States
- State: Washington
- County: Thurston
- Time zone: UTC-8 (Pacific (PST))
  - Summer (DST): UTC-7 (PDT)

Puget is an unincorporated community in Thurston County, in the U.S. state of Washington. The area is located on the Johnson Point peninsula overlooking Nisqually Reach.

== History ==
Puget was platted in 1873, but an economic downturn in 1893 stunted growth. A post office named Puget City began in 1890, but was shuttered in 1893; a newly-renamed post office named Puget opened in 1904, and closed permanently in 1928. Efforts were made to incorporate nearly all of the Peninsula in 1984 to prevent annexation by the neighboring City of Lacey, Washington but an election was never held.

== Parks and recreation ==
The community is near Tolmie State Park and the Nisqually National Wildlife Refuge.
