= Cowiche, Washington =

Unincorporated community in Washington, United States

- CDP
- Location within Yakima County Location within Washington (state)
- Coordinates: 46°40′19″N 120°42′43″W
- Country: United States
- State: Washington
- County: Yakima
- Elevation: 1,749 ft (533 m)

Population (2020)
  - Total: 535
- Time zone: UTC-8 (Pacific (PST))
  - Summer (DST): UTC-7 (PDT)
- ZIP code: 98923
- Area code: 509
- GNIS feature ID: 2584963

Cowiche (pronounced Cow-witch-ee) is a census-designated place and unincorporated community northwest of Yakima, Washington, near the eastern foothills of the Cascade Mountain range, in central Washington State (US). Cowiche, sometimes spelled Cowychee, is said to mean "footbridge between the valley and the mountains." According to the 2020 census, the town had a population of 535, which is an increase from 428 at 2010.

== History ==
The first inhabitants of the area were the Tkai'waichash-hlama, a band or tribe of Native American people who lived along Cowiche Creek. The area was settled in the late nineteenth century by farmers who relied upon crops that did not require irrigation, such as wheat, barley, rye, and grazing cattle. Homesteading in Cowiche was difficult since fields had to be cleared of volcanic rock before they could be tilled and there was little rainfall in summer. In 1906, construction began on the Tieton Irrigation Project, a division of the broader Yakima Project. Irrigation water became available in 1907, and shortly thereafter, orchards began to replace wheatfields.

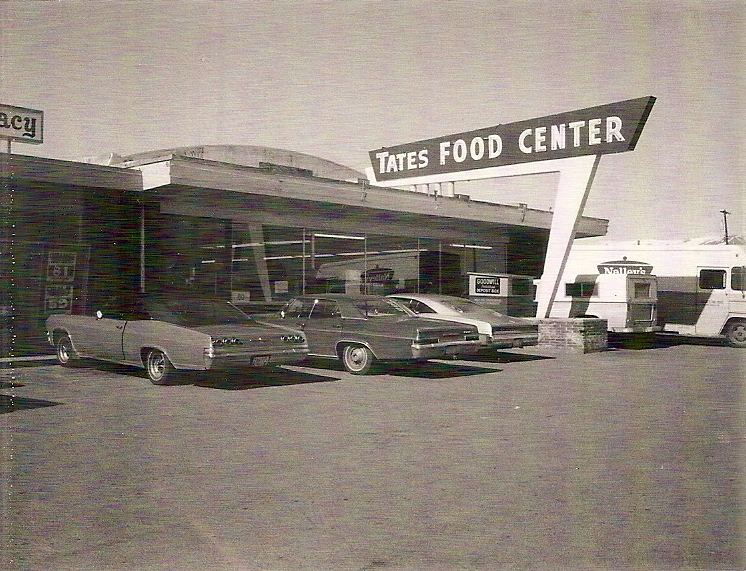
Tate's Food Center, Cowiche, Wa, about 1968

== Demographics ==
Historical population
Census	Pop.	Note	%±
2010	428		—
2020	535		25.0%
U.S. Decennial Census; 2000 2010

Cowiche first appeared as a census designated place in the 2010 U.S. census.

=== Racial and ethnic composition ===
Cowiche CDP, Washington – Racial and ethnic composition Note: the US Census treats Hispanic/Latino as an ethnic category. This table excludes Latinos from the racial categories and assigns them to a separate category. Hispanics/Latinos may be of any race.
Race / Ethnicity (NH = Non-Hispanic)	Pop 2010	Pop 2020	% 2010	% 2020
White alone (NH)	126	131	29.44%	24.49%
Black or African American alone (NH)	0	0	0.00%	0.00%
Native American or Alaska Native alone (NH)	1	3	0.23%	0.56%
Asian alone (NH)	1	1	0.23%	0.19%
Native Hawaiian or Pacific Islander alone (NH)	0	0	0.00%	0.00%
Other race alone (NH)	0	1	0.00%	0.19%
Mixed race or Multiracial (NH)	10	23	2.34%	4.30%
Hispanic or Latino (any race)	290	376	67.76%	70.28%
Total	428	535	100.00%	100.00%

== Education ==
Cowiche, along with the neighboring town of Tieton, is served by the Highland School district homepage. The community takes great pride in its high school sports programs, and in 1988 their varsity men's basketball team won the Washington State A division championship. The boys soccer team also won the state championship in 2006, 2007 and 2015.

Most people in the area are involved in agriculture. Cowiche, like much of the Yakima Valley, is known for its apple crops.
