= Sterling, Washington =

Unincorporated community in Washington, US

- Unincorporated community
- Location within Washington (state)
- Coordinates: 48°29′31″N 122°16′51″W
- Country: United States
- State: Washington
- County: Skagit
- Platted: 1878
- Elevation: 43 ft (13 m)
- Time zone: UTC-8 (Pacific (PST))
  - Summer (DST): UTC-7 (PDT)
- Area code(s): 360, 564
- GNIS feature ID: 1511336

Sterling is an unincorporated community in Skagit County, in the U.S. state of Washington.

== History ==
The Mesekwegwils (Lushootseed: bəsikʷigʷilc) (sometimes transliterated as Mee-see-qua-guilch or buh-see-kwee-GWEELTS), a band of the Skagit people, built a large winter longhouse at what is now Sterling. The Lushootseed name for Sterling, as well as the prior village site, is sxʷiʔxʷičəb.

Sterling was laid out in 1878. A post office called Sterling was established in 1879, and remained in operation until 1890. Sterling was the site of the first school in the Sedro-Woolley area; residents in the late nineteenth century would travel to Sedro-Woolley by canoe.
