= Blockhouse, Washington =

Unincorporated community in Washington, US

Coordinates: 45°50′22″N 120°56′15″W

Blockhouse is an unincorporated community in Klickitat County, in the U.S. state of Washington.

== History ==
Blockhouse had its start in the 1850s when a military fort was built near the town site. and was used during the Yakima War. A post office called Blockhouse was established in 1872, and remained in operation until 1930.
