= Cedarville, Whatcom County, Washington =

Unincorporated community in Washington, US

Cedarville, Washington
- Unincorporated community
- Location within Washington (state)
- Coordinates: 48°50′24″N 122°17′45″W
- Country: United States
- State: Washington
- County: Whatcom
- Elevation: 171 ft (52 m)
- Time zone: UTC-8 (Pacific (PST))
  - Summer (DST): UTC-7 (PDT)
- Area code(s): 360, 564
- GNIS feature ID: 1510866

Cedarville is an unincorporated community in Whatcom County, in the U.S. state of Washington.

The community took its name from the Cedarville Shingle Company.
