= Waukon, Washington =

Unincorporated community in Washington, United States

- Unincorporated community
- Location within Washington (state) Location within the United States
- Coordinates: 47°32′23″N 117°50′36″W
- Country: United States
- State: Washington
- County: Lincoln
- Elevation: 2,438 ft (743 m)
- Time zone: UTC-8 (Pacific (PST))
  - Summer (DST): UTC-7 (PDT)
- ZIP code: 99008
- Area code: 509
- GNIS feature ID: 1511412

Waukon is an unincorporated community in Lincoln County, in the U.S. state of Washington.

== History ==
Waukon had its start when the Spokane, Portland & Seattle Railway was extended to that point. A post office called Waukon was established in 1893, and remained in operation until 1973.
