= Maud, Washington =

Unincorporated community in Washington, United States

- Unincorporated community
- Location within Washington (state)
- Coordinates: 48°19′52″N 118°04′46″W
- Country: United States
- State: Washington
- County: Stevens
- Elevation: 2,408 ft (734 m)
- Time zone: UTC-8 (Pacific (PST))
  - Summer (DST): UTC-7 (PDT)
- ZIP code: 99167
- Area code: 509
- GNIS feature ID: 1522808

Maud is an unincorporated community in Stevens County, in the U.S. state of Washington.

== History ==
A post office called Maud was established in 1904, and remained in operation until 1914. The community was named after Maud Morgan, the child of an early settler.
