= Skagit County, Washington =

County in Washington, United States

- County
- Tulip fields in the Skagit Valley

- Seal

- Location within the U.S. state of Washington
- Coordinates: 48°29′N 121°47′W
- Country: United States
- State: Washington
- Founded: November 28, 1883
- Named for: Upper and Lower Skagit tribes
- Seat: Mount Vernon
- Largest city: Mount Vernon

Area
  - Total: 1,920 sq mi (5,000 km^{2})
  - Land: 1,731 sq mi (4,480 km^{2})
  - Water: 189 sq mi (490 km^{2}) 9.8%

Population (2020)
  - Total: 129,523
  - Estimate (2025): 132,975 ▲
  - Density: 71/sq mi (27/km^{2})
- Time zone: UTC−8 (Pacific)
  - Summer (DST): UTC−7 (PDT)
- Congressional district: 2nd
- Website: www.skagitcountywa.gov

Skagit County /ˈskædʒɪt/ is a county in the U.S. state of Washington. As of the 2020 census, the population was 129,523. The county seat and largest city is Mount Vernon. The county was formed in 1883 from the southern part of Whatcom County and is named for the Upper and Lower Skagit Indian tribes, which have been indigenous to the area prior to European-American settlement.

Skagit County comprises the Mount Vernon-Anacortes, WA Metropolitan Statistical Area, and is included in the Seattle-Tacoma, WA Combined Statistical Area. It is located in the Puget Sound region, and it is known for its strong agricultural sector and annual tulip festival.

== Geography ==
According to the United States Census Bureau, the county has a total area of 1,920 square miles (5,000 km^{2}), of which 1,731 square miles (4,480 km^{2}) is land and 189 square miles (490 km^{2}) (9.8%) is water. It is noted for its broad, fertile valley of the Skagit River, a center for cultivation of tulips, blueberries, and strawberries. Over 500 acres (200 ha) of tulips are grown in Skagit County, comprising 75 percent of the American commercial output with $20 million in annual gross income.

=== Geographic features ===
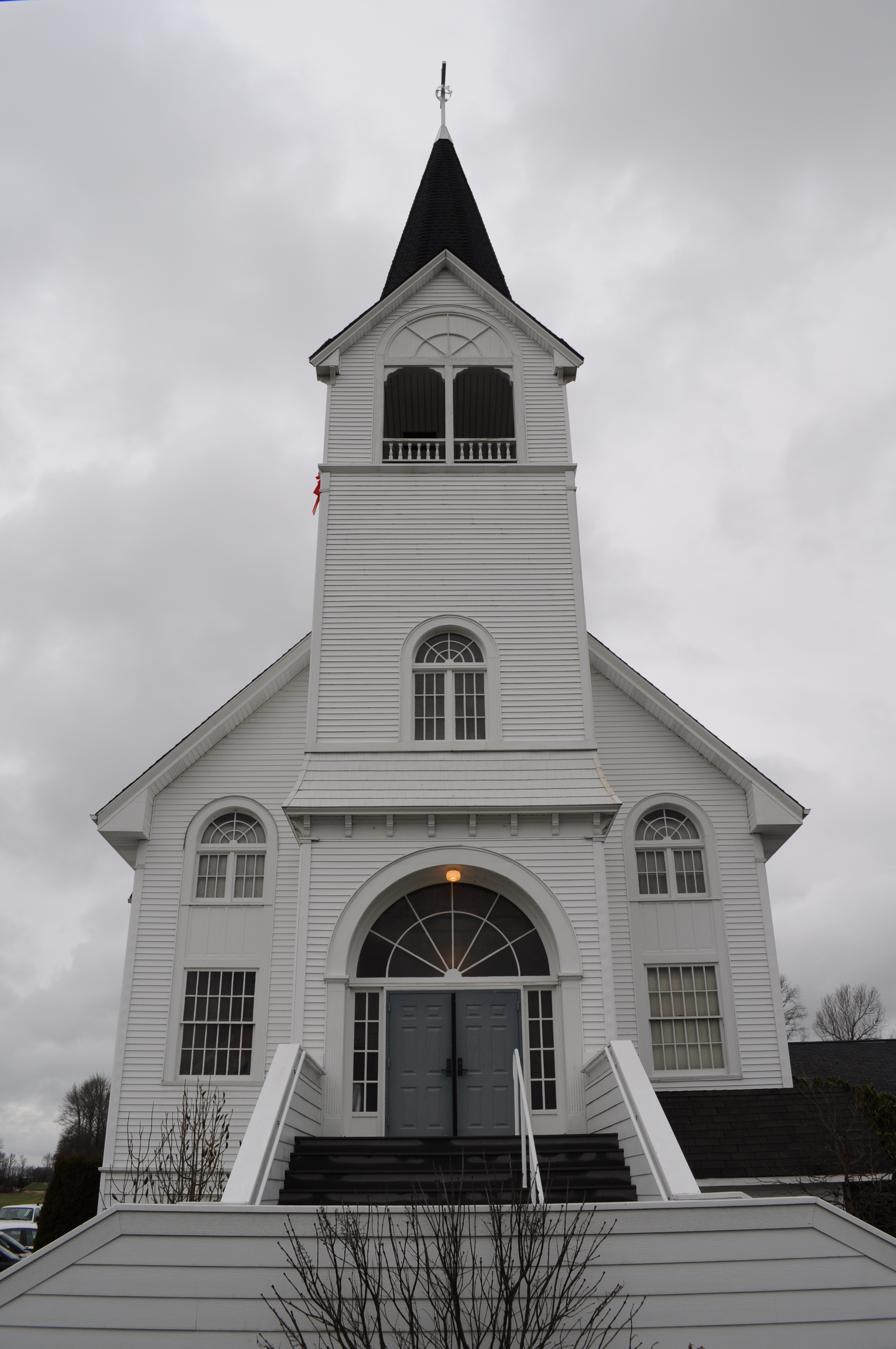
Fir-Conway Lutheran Church.

- Allan Island
- Big Lake
- Burrows Island
- Cascade Mountains
- Cypress Island
- Fir Island
- Fidalgo Island
- Guemes Island
- Hart Island
- Hope Island
- Kiket Island
- Pass Island
- Samish Island
- Sauk River
- Sinclair Island
- Skagit Island
- Skagit River
- Vendovi Island
- Mount Buckner, highest point in Skagit County

=== Adjacent counties ===
- Whatcom County – north
- Okanogan County – east
- Chelan County – southeast
- Snohomish County – south
- Island County – southwest
- San Juan County – west

=== National protected areas ===
- Mount Baker-Snoqualmie National Forest (part)
- North Cascades National Park (part)
- Ross Lake National Recreation Area (part)
- Pacific Northwest National Scenic Trail (part)

== Demographics ==
Historical population
Census	Pop.	Note	%±
1890	8,747		—
1900	14,272		63.2%
1910	29,241		104.9%
1920	33,373		14.1%
1930	35,142		5.3%
1940	37,650		7.1%
1950	43,273		14.9%
1960	51,350		18.7%
1970	52,381		2.0%
1980	64,138		22.4%
1990	79,555		24.0%
2000	102,979		29.4%
2010	116,901		13.5%
2020	129,523		10.8%
2025 (est.)	132,975	▲	2.7%
U.S. Decennial Census; 1790–1960 1900–1990; 1990–2000 2010–2020

=== 2020 census ===
As of the 2020 census, the county had a population of 129,523. Of the residents, 21.5% were under the age of 18 and 22.4% were 65 years of age or older; the median age was 42.2 years. For every 100 females there were 96.9 males, and for every 100 females age 18 and over there were 95.2 males. 65.9% of residents lived in urban areas and 34.1% lived in rural areas.

Skagit County, Washington – Racial and ethnic composition Note: the US Census treats Hispanic/Latino as an ethnic category. This table excludes Latinos from the racial categories and assigns them to a separate category. Hispanics/Latinos may be of any race.
Race / Ethnicity (NH = Non-Hispanic)	Pop 2000	Pop 2010	Pop 2020	% 2000	% 2010	% 2020
White alone (NH)	85,496	89,694	92,347	83.02%	76.73%	71.30%
Black or African American alone (NH)	422	640	793	0.41%	0.55%	0.61%
Native American or Alaska Native alone (NH)	1,783	2,038	2,052	1.73%	1.74%	1.58%
Asian alone (NH)	1,513	2,025	2,771	1.47%	1.73%	2.14%
Pacific Islander alone (NH)	146	180	388	0.14%	0.15%	0.30%
Other race alone (NH)	158	159	723	0.15%	0.14%	0.56%
Mixed race or Multiracial (NH)	1,925	2,456	6,657	1.87%	2.10%	5.14%
Hispanic or Latino (any race)	11,536	19,709	23,792	11.20%	16.86%	18.37%
Total	102,979	116,901	129,523	100.00%	100.00%	100.00%

The racial makeup of the county was 74.5% White, 0.7% Black or African American, 2.2% American Indian and Alaska Native, 2.2% Asian, 9.4% from some other race, and 10.6% from two or more races. Hispanic or Latino residents of any race comprised 18.4% of the population.

There were 50,371 households in the county, of which 28.4% had children under the age of 18 living with them and 24.1% had a female householder with no spouse or partner present. About 25.8% of all households were made up of individuals and 13.7% had someone living alone who was 65 years of age or older.

There were 55,744 housing units, of which 9.6% were vacant. Among occupied housing units, 69.8% were owner-occupied and 30.2% were renter-occupied. The homeowner vacancy rate was 1.1% and the rental vacancy rate was 4.1%.

=== 2010 census ===
As of the 2010 census, there were 116,901 people, 45,557 households, and 30,656 families living in the county. The population density was 67.5 people per square mile (26.1 people/km^{2}). There were 51,473 housing units at an average density of 29.7 units per square mile (11.5 units/km^{2}). The racial makeup of the county was 83.4% white, 2.2% American Indian, 1.8% Asian, 0.7% black or African American, 0.2% Pacific islander, 8.7% from other races, and 3.2% from two or more races. Those of Hispanic or Latino origin made up 16.9% of the population. The largest ancestry groups were: 17.8% German, 14.9% Mexican, 13.7% English, 11.4% Irish, 8.3% Norwegian, 4.8% Swedish, and 4.3% Dutch.

Of the 45,557 households, 30.8% had children under the age of 18 living with them, 52.1% were married couples living together, 10.1% had a female householder with no husband present, 32.7% were non-families, and 25.6% of all households were made up of individuals. The average household size was 2.53 and the average family size was 3.01. The median age was 40.1 years.

The median income for a household in the county was $54,811 and the median income for a family was $63,468. Males had a median income of $48,979 versus $34,628 for females. The per capita income for the county was $26,925. About 7.4% of families and 11.7% of the population were below the poverty line, including 16.0% of those under age 18 and 6.2% of those age 65 or over.

=== 2000 census ===
As of the 2000 census, there were 102,979 people, 38,852 households, and 27,351 families living in the county. The population density was 59 people per square mile (23 people/km^{2}). There were 42,681 housing units at an average density of 25 units per square mile (9.7 units/km^{2}). The racial makeup of the county was 86.49% White, 0.44% Black or African American, 1.85% Native American, 1.49% Asian, 0.16% Pacific Islander, 7.17% from other races, and 2.40% from two or more races. 11.20% of the population were Hispanic or Latino of any race. 13.9% were of German, 11.2% English, 9.2% Norwegian, 8.2% Irish and 6.7% United States or American ancestry.

Three Coast Salish Native American tribes have reservations in the county: the Swinomish, Upper Skagit, and Samish.

There were 38,852 households, out of which 32.80% had children under the age of 18 living with them, 56.60% were married couples living together, 9.70% had a female householder with no husband present, and 29.60% were non-families. 23.30% of all households were made up of individuals, and 10.00% had someone living alone who was 65 years of age or older. The average household size was 2.60 and the average family size was 3.06.

In the county, the population was spread out, with 26.30% under the age of 18, 8.60% from 18 to 24, 26.90% from 25 to 44, 23.60% from 45 to 64, and 14.60% who were 65 years of age or older. The median age was 37 years. For every 100 females there were 98.00 males. For every 100 females age 18 and over, there were 95.70 males.

The median income for a household in the county was $42,381, and the median income for a family was $48,347. Males had a median income of $37,207 versus $26,123 for females. The per capita income for the county was $21,256. About 7.90% of families and 11.10% of the population were below the poverty line, including 13.50% of those under age 18 and 6.80% of those age 65 or over.

== Government ==
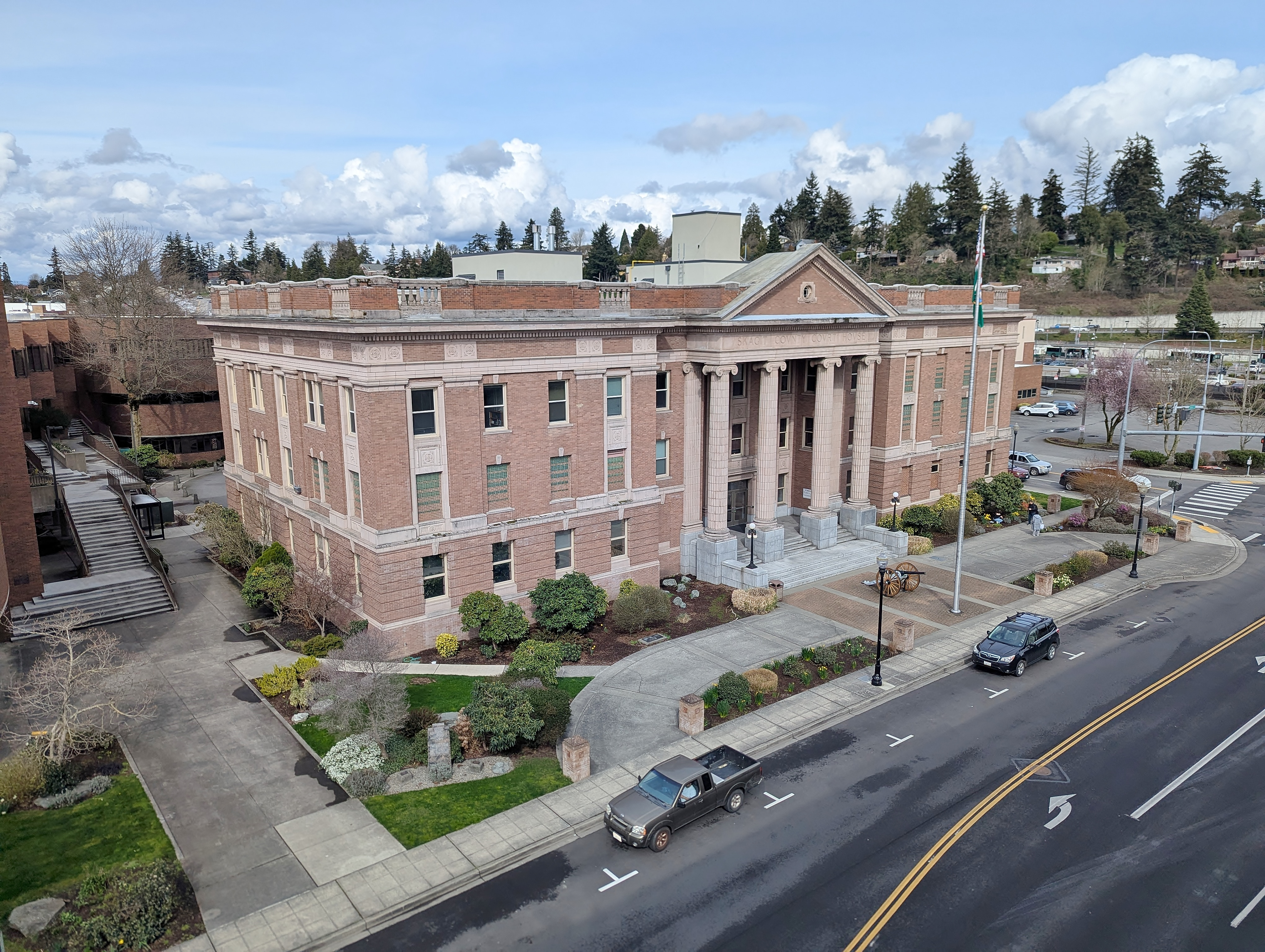
The Skagit County Courthouse in downtown Mount Vernon

Skagit County's government is headed by three commissioners, in the system laid out in the state constitution for all counties without charters. Commissioners are "nominated" in the primary by their district, but then are elected in the general by a county-wide vote. Commissioners are therefore said to represent the entire county, and not just their district. The most recent election was on November 5, 2024.

The current Skagit County commissioners include Joe Burns, appointed to complete Lisa Janicki's term, a Democrat from District 3, which encompasses Burlington east of Interstate 5, Sedro-Woolley, and the rest of eastern Skagit County; Peter Browning, an independent from District 2, which covers Mount Vernon, Conway, and south county; and Ron Wesen, a Republican from District 1, which includes Anacortes, La Conner, and that area of the county west of Interstate 5 and north of McLean Road.

== Politics ==
Skagit County was a bellwether county from the election of Ronald Reagan in 1980 through the reelection of Barack Obama in 2012, voting for the winning candidate in each presidential election during this time period. The streak was broken when it voted for Democrat Hillary Clinton in 2016 (although only by a plurality). The trend towards Democratic candidates continued, with Skagit County voting for Kamala Harris in 2024 despite a nationwide rightward trend.

United States presidential election results for Skagit County, Washington
Year	Republican		Democratic		Third party(ies)	
Year	No.	%	No.	%	No.	%
1892	1,246	42.92%	923	31.79%	734	25.28%
1896	1,268	43.41%	1,623	55.56%	30	1.03%
1900	1,814	55.90%	1,220	37.60%	211	6.50%
1904	3,051	69.93%	880	20.17%	432	9.90%
1908	2,924	56.42%	1,449	27.96%	810	15.63%
1912	2,399	25.97%	1,962	21.24%	4,876	52.79%
1916	4,142	40.17%	4,936	47.88%	1,232	11.95%
1920	5,320	51.62%	1,840	17.85%	3,146	30.53%
1924	5,071	47.95%	699	6.61%	4,806	45.44%
1928	8,336	73.58%	2,848	25.14%	145	1.28%
1932	4,246	30.57%	8,395	60.45%	1,247	8.98%
1936	5,222	33.44%	9,639	61.73%	754	4.83%
1940	7,985	44.44%	9,796	54.51%	189	1.05%
1944	7,805	45.03%	9,409	54.29%	118	0.68%
1948	8,176	44.94%	9,080	49.91%	936	5.15%
1952	11,446	57.37%	8,321	41.71%	185	0.93%
1956	12,149	56.67%	9,243	43.11%	48	0.22%
1960	12,168	52.40%	11,003	47.39%	49	0.21%
1964	8,138	36.15%	14,344	63.72%	28	0.12%
1968	10,354	45.83%	10,529	46.60%	1,711	7.57%
1972	14,212	58.13%	9,233	37.77%	1,003	4.10%
1976	13,060	48.66%	12,718	47.39%	1,059	3.95%
1980	15,520	50.68%	11,299	36.90%	3,804	12.42%
1984	18,840	56.53%	13,947	41.85%	539	1.62%
1988	16,550	51.08%	15,159	46.79%	692	2.14%
1992	13,388	32.87%	15,936	39.13%	11,404	28.00%
1996	16,397	39.88%	18,295	44.49%	6,426	15.63%
2000	22,163	49.01%	20,432	45.18%	2,626	5.81%
2004	26,139	50.05%	25,131	48.12%	960	1.84%
2008	24,687	44.17%	30,053	53.78%	1,146	2.05%
2012	25,071	45.36%	28,688	51.91%	1,510	2.73%
2016	24,736	42.60%	26,690	45.97%	6,633	11.42%
2020	32,762	44.62%	38,252	52.10%	2,409	3.28%
2024	30,765	43.79%	36,956	52.60%	2,535	3.61%

== County conservation efforts ==
In 2006, the Skagit County Marine Resources Committee commissioned a study to evaluate establishing one or more no-take marine reserves to protect rockfish and other groundfish from overfishing.

== Transportation ==
Skagit Transit provides the county with bus service. It also offers connections to Everett, Bellingham, Whidbey Island and Camano Island, and operates the Guemes Island ferry linking Anacortes to Guemes Island.

=== Major highways ===
- Interstate 5
- State Route 9
- State Route 20

== Communities ==
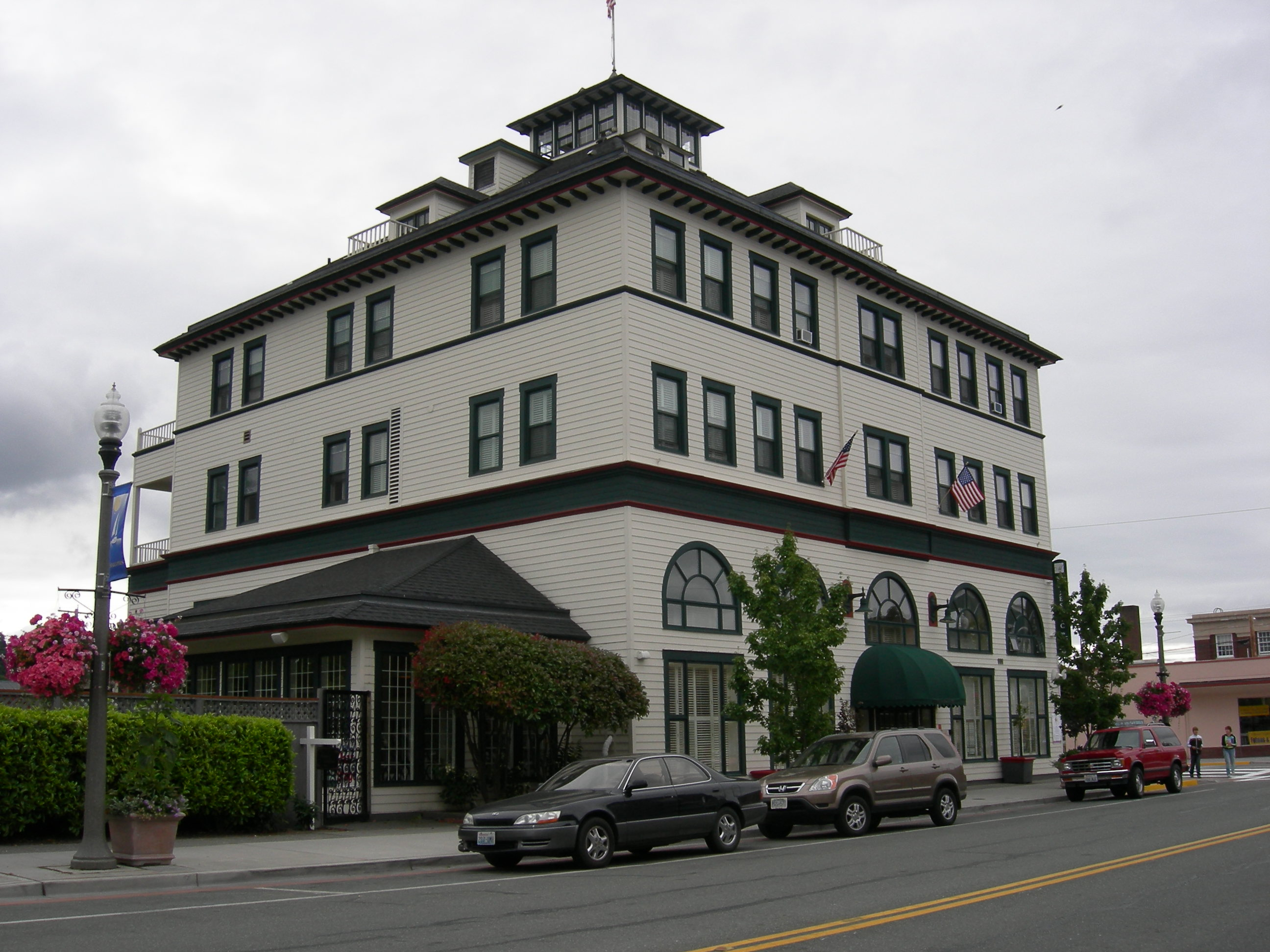
Majestic Inn, Anacortes, Washington.

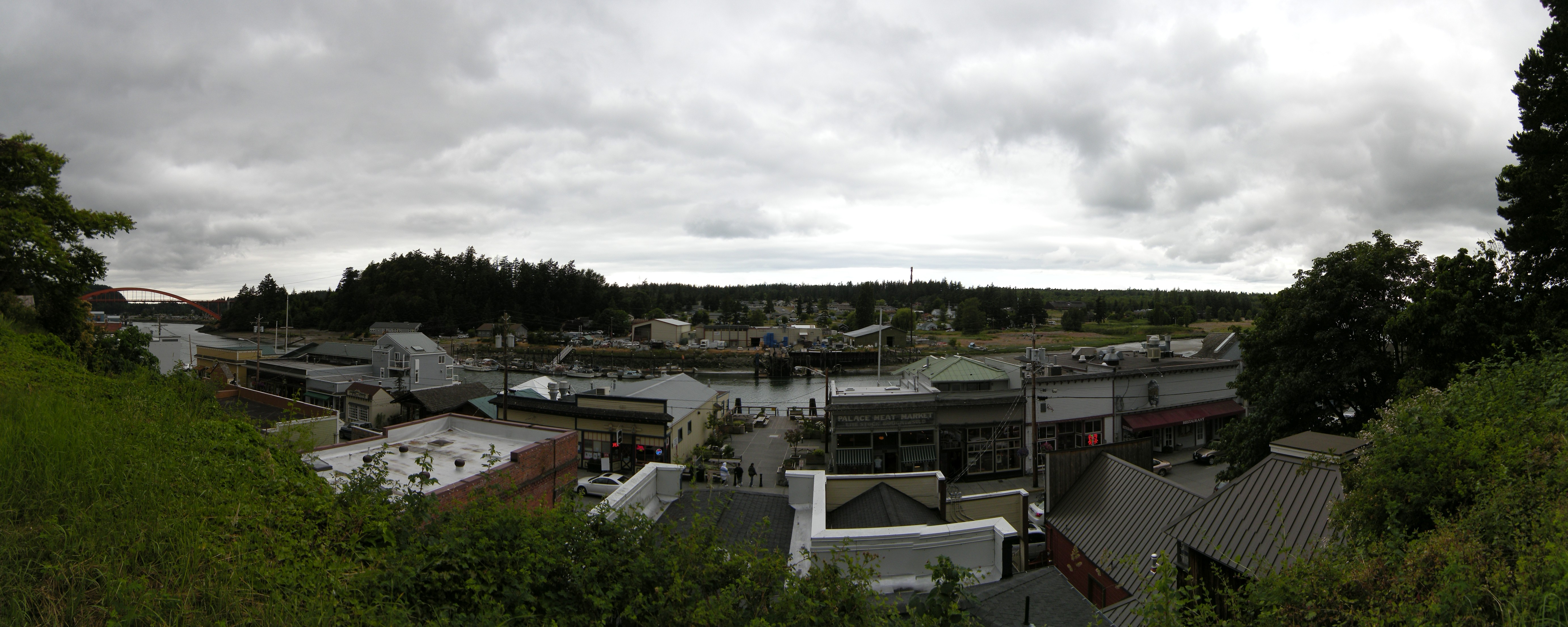
Downtown La Conner, Washington.

=== Cities ===
- Anacortes
- Burlington
- Mount Vernon (county seat)
- Sedro-Woolley

=== Towns ===
- Concrete
- Hamilton
- La Conner
- Lyman

=== Census-designated places ===
- Alger
- Bay View
- Big Lake
- Bow
- Clear Lake
- Conway
- Edison
- Lake Cavanaugh
- Lake McMurray
- Marblemount
- Rockport

=== Unincorporated communities ===
- Allen
- Avon
- Birdsview
- Blanchard
- Cedardale
- Cokedale
- Day Creek
- Dewey
- Fidalgo
- Fishtown
- Gibraltar
- Guemes Island
- Hickson
- Hoogdal
- Milltown
- Rexville
- Samish Island
- Similk Beach
- Sterling
- Van Horn

=== Reservations ===
- Swinomish Indian Reservation
- Upper Skagit Indian Reservation
- Samish Indian Reservation

=== Ghost towns ===
- Alpine
- Ehrlich
- Sauk City
- Skagit City
- Whitney
- Equality

== Education ==
Several school districts serve students in Skagit County:

- Anacortes School District
- Burlington-Edison School District
- Concrete School District
- Conway School District
- Darrington School District
- La Conner School District
- Mount Vernon School District
- Sedro-Woolley School District

== Film ==
The experimental horror film Skagit was set and shot in Skagit County.

== See also ==
- National Register of Historic Places listings in Skagit County, Washington
- Equality Colony
