= Newaukum Creek =

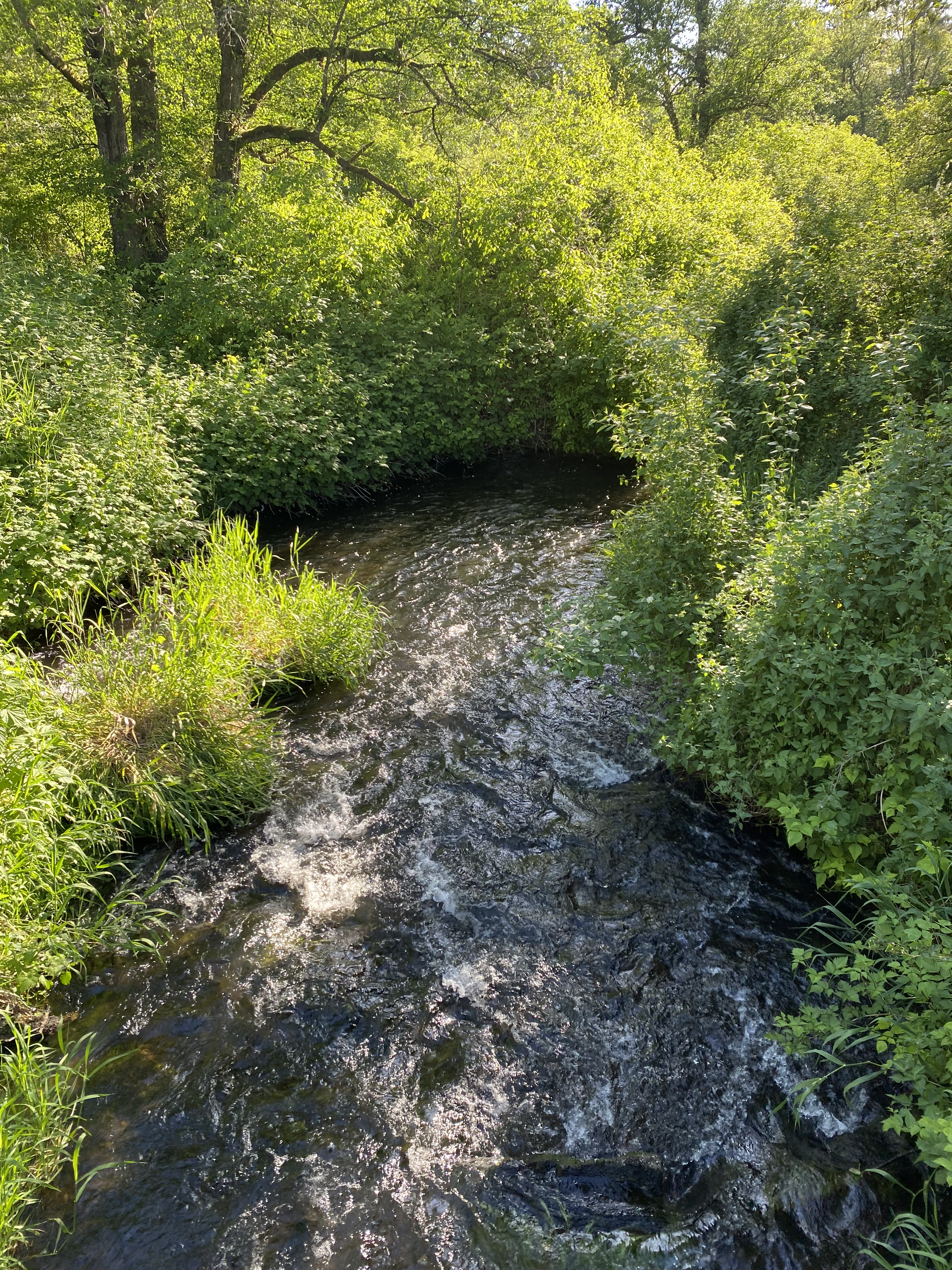
- Newaukum Creek from Mahler Park in Enumclaw, Washington

Location
- Country: United States
- State: Washington
- County: King County

Physical characteristics
- Source: Boise Ridge
  - coordinates: 47°13′48″N 121°53′14″W
- Mouth: Green River
  - coordinates: 47°17′06″N 122°04′08″W
- Length: 14.0 mi (22.5 km)
- Basin size: 27.8 sq mi (72 km^{2})
- Discharge
  - average: 42 cu ft (1.2 m^{3})

Basin features
- Cities: Enumclaw
- Tributaries
  - left: Watercress Creek
  - right: North Fork Newaukum Creek, Big Spring Creek

Newaukum Creek is a tributary of the Green River in King County, Washington, United States. About 14.0 miles (22.5 km) long, it originates from several small streams in forests on Boise Ridge, in the foothills of the Cascade Range. After descending steeply through gullies on the ridge, it enters a broad plateau where it meanders through farmland north of the city of Enumclaw. It turns northwest and enters a steep ravine, from which it later emerges and meets the Green River, which ultimately drains into Puget Sound.

The Newaukum watershed's topography was heavily shaped by glaciation during the Vashon Stade and later the Osceola Mudflow. The watershed features farmlands across the plateau and western hemlock forests in the uplands. The creek is a spawning ground for salmonids and serves as an especially important habitat for Chinook salmon, Coho salmon, and steelhead trout. It also hosts invertebrates such as western pearlshell mussels and crayfish. Human modification in the twentieth century such as dredging damaged the creek, but restoration efforts have sought to restore salmonid access to the headwaters and remove invasive plants such as reed canarygrass.

== Course and tributaries ==
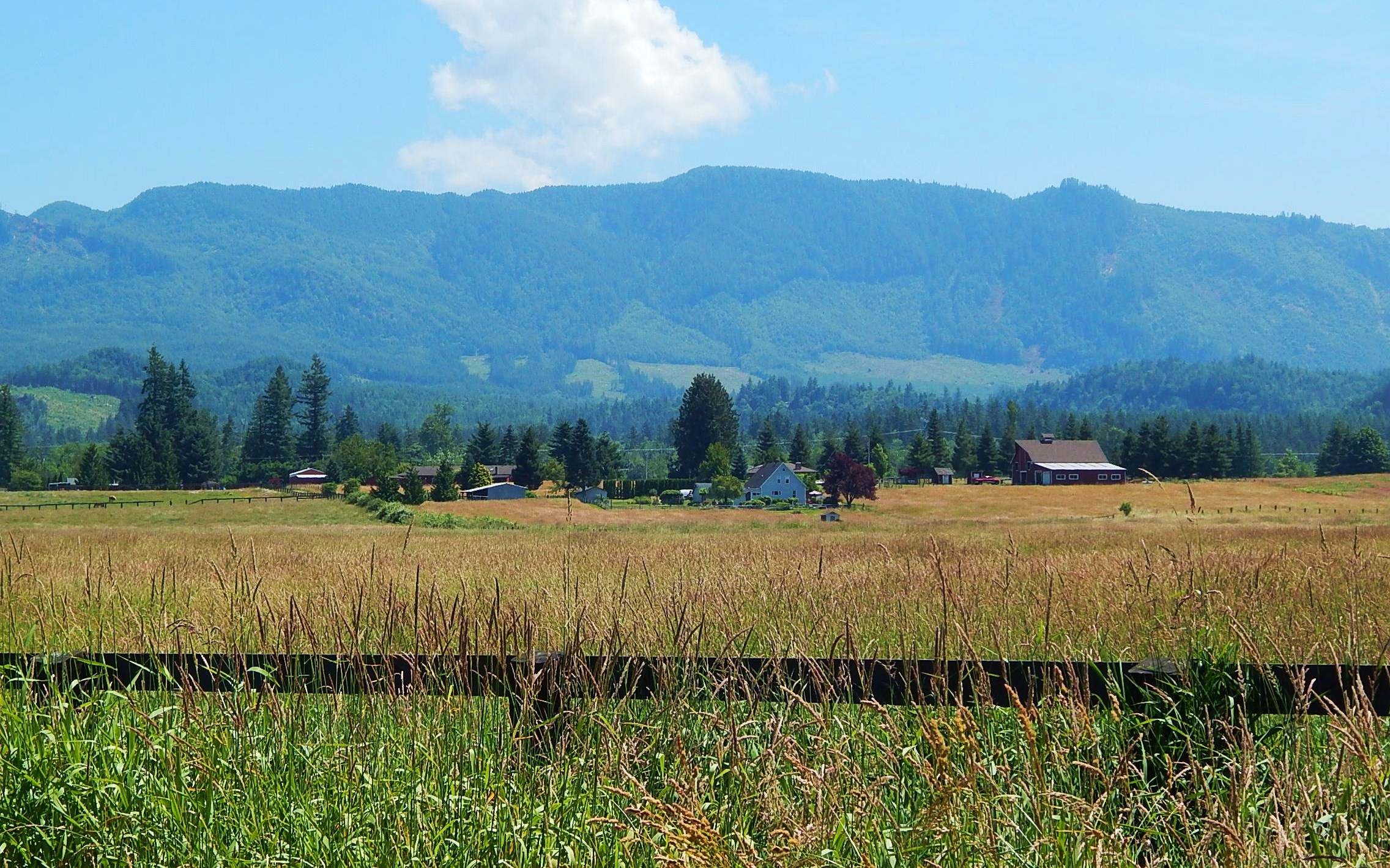
Boise Ridge, the source of Newaukum Creek and its upper tributaries

Newaukum Creek is formed from the confluence of several small tributary streams in a forested region on Boise Ridge, in the foothills of the Cascade Range of western Washington state, eventually meeting the Green River after a 14.0-mile (22.5 km) course. After flowing west for about 4.3 miles (6.9 km) from its source, it receives the 3.95-mile (6.36 km) North Fork Newaukum Creek as a tributary. The North Fork itself receives the 2.7-mile (4.3 km) Stonequarry Creek as a tributary shortly before the confluence. About 0.4 miles (0.64 km) downstream, the mainstem takes in another small tributary, the 2.6-mile (4.2 km)-long Watercress Creek.

After taking in Watercress Creek, Newaukum Creek curves southwest for several miles, flowing north of the city of Enumclaw, before turning northwest for about half a mile and taking in the 1.1-mile (1.8 km)-long Big Spring Creek. After this, it flows north for several miles before entering a ravine, through which it continues north for about 4 miles (6.4 km), during which it takes in an unnamed 2.2-mile (3.5 km)-long tributary. It exits the ravine and cuts through the floodplain of the Green River for about 0.2 miles (0.3 km) before meeting with it. The Green River flows generally northwest after this confluence, later becoming the Duwamish River and draining into Puget Sound at Seattle about 40.7 miles (65.5 km) after taking in Newaukum Creek.

== Hydrology ==
The headwaters of the Newaukum Creek and its north fork descend steeply through gullies on Boise Ridge before joining and flowing through the relatively flat Enumclaw Plateau. While on the plateau, the channel of the river is unconfined (able to meander through the landscape) and only gradually descending. Upon entering the steep-walled ravine north of Enumclaw, it begins to descend steeply at a rate of 150 feet per mile (28 meters per kilometer).

The Newaukum watershed is about 27.8 square miles (72 km^{2}) in area. About a quarter of the watershed in the upper portions consists of commercial timberlands. On the plateau around Enumclaw, the land is largely agricultural and residential areas. The area around the downstream ravine is mainly forested, but by the early 2000s some houses had been constructed in the area. As of 2011, the city of Enumclaw maintained two water sources in the Newaukum watershed: Watercress Spring and Well and the PC Johnson Wellfield.

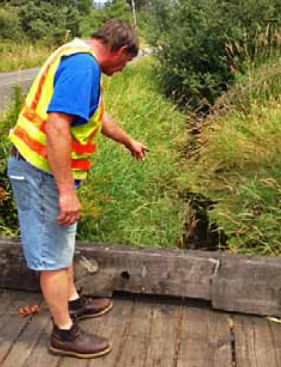
A man points to Big Spring Creek, a Newaukum tributary rerouted through an artificial ditch

Across a typical year, Newaukum Creek has a mean daily flow rate of 42 cubic feet (1,200 L) per second. Minimum daily flows can reach 10 cubic feet (280 L) per second during the summer, and maximum rates can reach 100 cubic feet (2,800 L) per second during the winter. The flow rate expected from a 100-year flood (the worst flood expected in a given 100-year period) may exceed 2,560 cubic feet (72,000 L) per second.

The temperature of the region is broadly similar to other portions of the Puget Sound region; at Enumclaw, the mean maximum daily temperature during summer is 75 °F (24 °C), and the mean minimum during winter is 36 °F (2 °C). The overall annual mean temperature is 52.2 °F (11.2 °C). Precipitation in the region is much higher than in lower-lying regions, and is especially high in the mountainous areas at the eastern margin of the watershed. Near Enumclaw, monthly precipitation ranges from 0.33 inches (0.84 cm) during July to 13.8 inches (35 cm) in January.

== Geology ==
Boise Ridge is composed of igneous rocks from two stratigraphic units: the andesite-dominated Fifes Peaks Formation and the volcaniclastic-dominated (mainly tuff and volcanic breccia) Ohanapecosh Formation. Several igneous intrusions of andesite break through the plateau west of Boise Ridge.

Much of the topography of the region was shaped by glacial ice during the Quaternary glaciations. About 17,000 years ago, during the Vashon Stade (the last glacial episode in the Puget Sound), the Puget Lobe of the Cordilleran ice sheet advanced southward and covered much of the region's lowlands. A layer of glacial outwash was deposited during the advance, only visible in small outcroppings along the creek's ravine today, but likely underlying much of the present surface. The advance also deposited glacial till, underlying much of the western portion of the Enumclaw Plateau. As the glacial lobe reached its maximum and began to retreat, it deposited ice-contact deposits and sediments, formed by melting ice. The creek passes through a complex of ice-contact sediments as it descends from Boise Ridge.

The Enumclaw Plateau in the central part of the basin, about 500 to 750 feet (150 to 230 m) above sea level, was created by the Osceola Mudflow, a volcanic mudflow created by the eruption of Mount Rainier about 5,600 years ago. About 45% of soils in the watershed are derived from glacial deposits, and about 32% originate from the mudflow. Smaller amounts originate from volcanic rocks or from organic material in wetlands.

== Biology ==
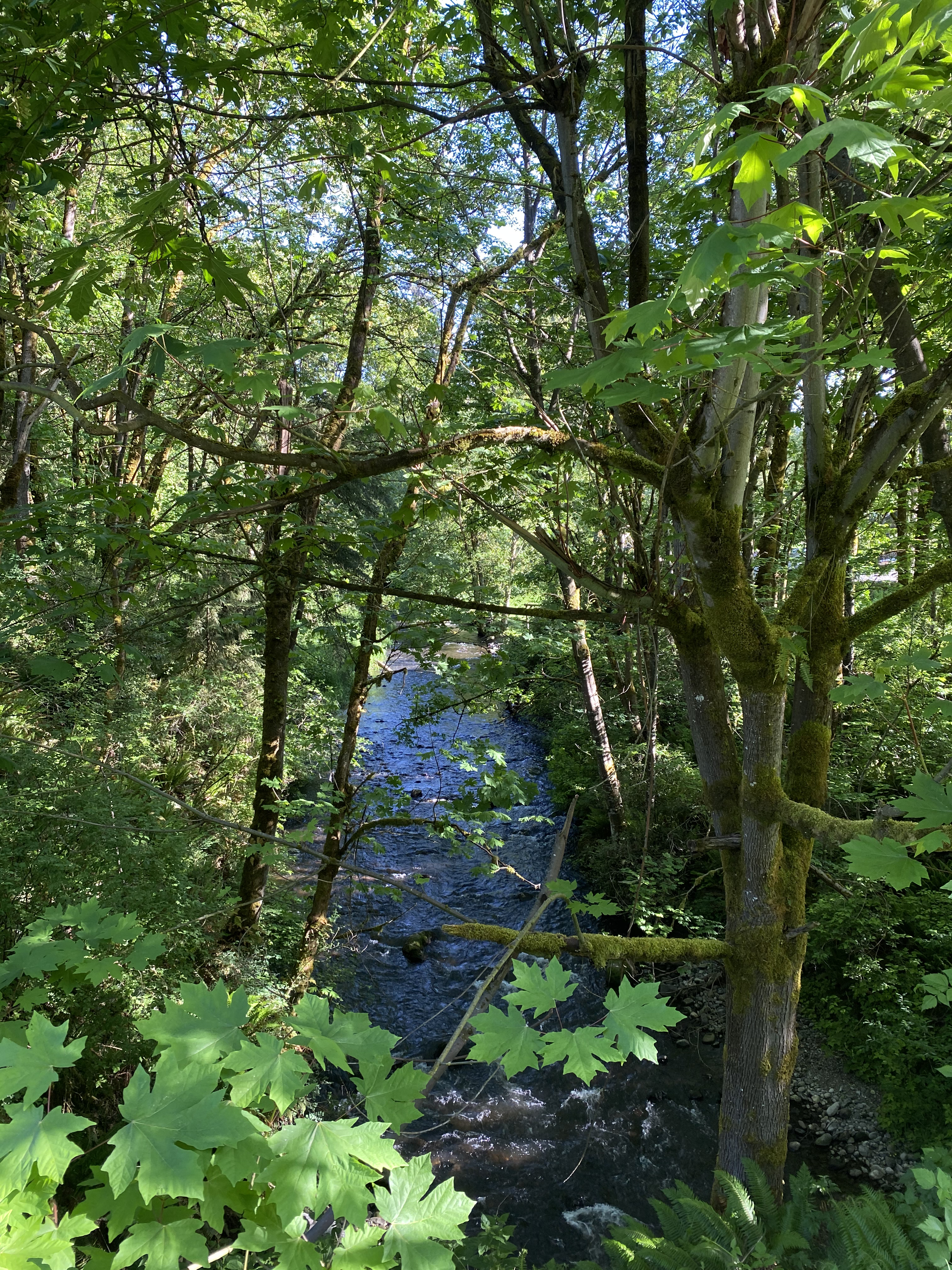
Foliage around the creek near Enumclaw

Salmonids have historically spawned in Newaukum Creek; Chinook salmon, pink salmon, coho salmon, chum salmon, steelhead trout, and cutthroat trout are all attested. By the early 1990s, the spring run of Chinook salmon had disappeared, and the local chum salmon population faced extinction. Due to favorable gravel conditions in the watershed, Newaukum Creek and its tributaries are particularly important habitats for the Green River system's steelhead, coho, and Chinook populations. Coho spawn as far as 11.5 miles (18.5 km) upstream from the creek's mouth.

Detritivores in the Newaukum watershed include invertebrates such as western pearlshell mussels, fingernail clams, and crayfish, as well as the larval forms of lamprey. The invertebrate community of the creek is dominated by organisms that feed on periphyton and organic matter on rocky surfaces. Examples include Cinygmula mayflies, Glossosoma caddisflies, and snails of the family Planorbidae.

Newaukum Creek is within a biome dominated by western hemlock forests. Such forests typically feature infrequent but intense wildfires, with average intervals between fires possibly as long as 750 years (compared to around 230 years for Douglas fir forest). The invasive plant Phalaris arundinacea (reed canarygrass) is common throughout the Newaukum watershed. A lack of old-growth forest in the watershed has expatriated bird species such as bald eagles and spotted owls, although red-tailed hawks are known to breed in the area.

== History ==
The Coast Salish peoples occupied the Puget Sound region for thousands of years before colonization, the earliest evidence of human habitation in the Duwamish-Green watershed being dated to c. 12,000 BCE. The Newaukum watershed is part of the Muckleshoot Tribe's usual and accustomed fishing area, now protected under treaty rights. Attributed to unspecified Native American languages, "Newaukum" is a toponym said to mean "gently-flowing waters". The name is given to several geographical features in Western Washington, including the Newaukum River and the community of Newaukum in Lewis County. Major wildfires among the upper White and Green River valleys in 1701, 1872, and 1899 may have affected the Newaukum basin.

The nearby city of Enumclaw was homesteaded by settlers Frank and Mary Stevenson in 1879 and platted six years later. It was incorporated in 1913. Historically, about 40% of the creek's basin consisted of wetland. Due to the fertile soils of these wetlands, farmers from the early-to-mid 20th century attempted to dredge areas around the creek, and laid pipes to use the creek's water for irrigation. The reclaimed land frequently flooded, often rendering fields unusable; such fields were often overtaken by invasive species such as reed canarygrass. During the 1950s, woody debris was systematically removed from the lower reaches of the creek to protect a bridge near its mouth.

From 1984 to 1990, a landowner periodically bulldozed the lowest 0.3-mile (0.5 km) portion of the creek to straighten it and prevent it from meandering, piling woody debris to maintain the dug channel. This modification prompted a nearby landowner to build a revetment along the riverbank. These modifications lowered the quantity of large wood pieces and logjams in the lower portion of the river over the following decade. Enumclaw's water consumption, partially met through water from the Newaukum watershed, grew significantly over the late 20th century, rising from 330 million gallons per year in 1962 to 1.2 billion in 1998.

Around the late 1980s, dairies in the Newaukum Creek basin began constructing manure lagoons to alleviate the effects of cow manure on the creek's water quality. A culvert and the remains of a dam were removed from the creek's North Fork in 1998, allowing salmonids to access the headwaters. Beginning in 2001, King County began to acquire land in the Newaukum watershed, mainly wetlands, for restoration efforts. The county planted trees across these wetlands, lowering water temperatures and killing reed canarygrass. In 2014, the U.S. Army Corps of Engineers performed restoration work on Big Spring Creek, a Newaukum tributary stream, freeing it from a series of artificial ditches it occupied back towards a meandering course.
