= Suntop =

Suntop or Sun Top may refer to:

== Places ==
- Suntop Homes, a series of Usonian houses in Ardmore, Pennsylvania by Frank Lloyd Wright
- Suntop Lookout, a fire lookout tower near Mount Rainier on Washington State, USA.

== Characters ==
- Suntop, a character in the comic book series Elfquest, later called Sunstream.

== Products ==
- Sun Top, a juice drink manufactured by Co-Ro Food
  - Suntop Island (Arabic: جزيرة سن توب), a TV series broadcast on Spacetoon in Saudi Arabia, related to the juice drink.
- Sun top, a type of clothing top that protects the wearer from sunlight.
- Sun top, another name for a Bimini top, an open-front canvas top on a metal frame for the cockpit of a jeep or a boat.
- Suntop, a camera lens from Pentax

== Other uses ==
- Suntop Media Ltd., a training and consulting company founded by Des Dearlove
