= West Crater =

Lava dome in Washington, United States

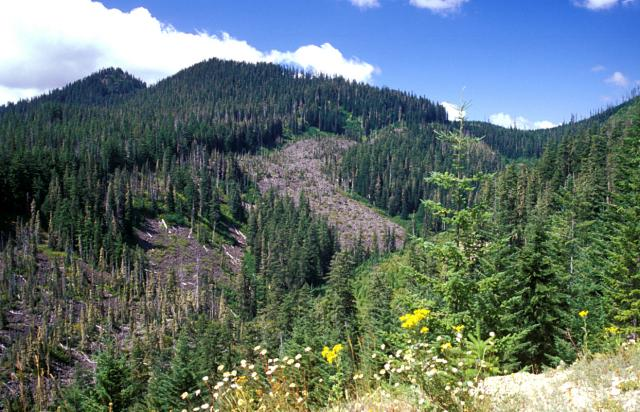

Highest point
- Elevation: 4,131 ft (1,259 m)
- Coordinates: 45°52′26″N 122°05′01″W

Geography
- Location within Washington (state)
- Location: Skamania County, Washington, U.S.
- Parent range: Cascade Range
- Topo map: Lookout Mountain

Geology
- Rock age: Holocene
- Mountain type: lava dome
- Volcanic arc: Cascade Volcanic Arc
- Volcanic field: Marble Mountain-Trout Creek Hill
- Last eruption: ~8,000 years BP

West Crater is a small lava dome with associated lava flows in southern Washington, United States. Located in Skamania County, it rises to an elevation of 4,131 feet (1,259 m), and forms part of the Cascade Volcanic Arc. It is also part of the Marble Mountain-Trout Creek Hill volcanic field, a little-known Quaternary volcanic field in the southern Cascades of Washington state. The area can be hiked, and can be accessed by roads in the Gifford Pinchot National Forest.

One of 13 volcanic cones in the West Crater-Soda Peaks zone, which covers an area of 39 square miles (100 km^{2}), West Crater is part of a monogenetic volcanic field with basaltic to andesitic volcanic edifices that vary from 360,000 years old to 2,000 years old. It has a summit crater with a width of 660 feet (200 m) and a depth of 79 feet (24 m). West Crater's lava dome formed on the floor of a glacial cirque, and has a similar size to the lava dome formed after the 1980 eruption of Mount St. Helens. West Crater has erupted at least two large lava flows within the Holocene epoch, about 8,000 years before present, each of which extend about 2 miles (3.2 km) from the volcano. Emplaced into canyons on the sides of the crater, the flows are being eroded by local streams. The lava dome likely formed before the lava flows erupted.

== Geography and access ==
West Crater lies in Skamania County, in the U.S. state of Washington. It reaches an elevation of 4,131 feet (1,259 m).^{[a]} The volcano was registered with the United States Geographic Names Information System in 1979.

West Crater and the rest of the Marble Mountain-Trout Creek Hill field can be accessed by roads in the Gifford Pinchot National Forest and Mount St. Helens National Volcanic Monument. Washington Route 503 and Forest Service Route 90 lie 31 miles (50 km) to the east of Woodland. West Crater can be accessed by traveling north on the Wind River highway and following Forest Service road 54.

== Geology ==
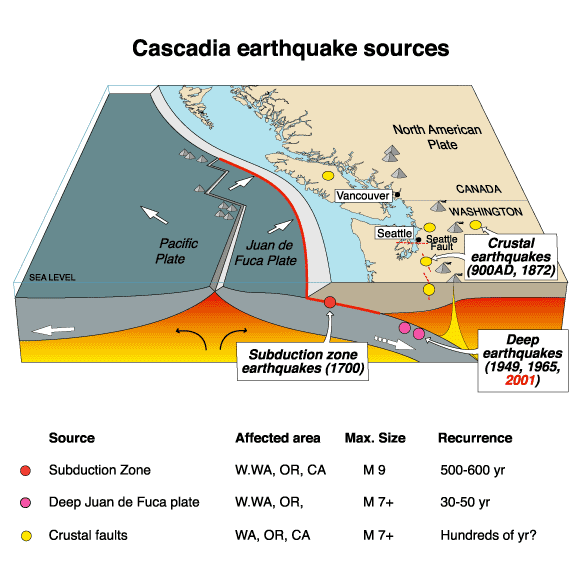
The Juan de Fuca tectonic plate is being subducted under the North American Plate, leading to volcanic activity in the Cascades like at West Crater

In southern Washington state, the Cascade Range, which sits south of the dacitic Garibaldi Volcanic Belt, spans 600 miles (970 km) from British Columbia in Canada to Lassen Peak in northern California in the United States. Volcanoes in the range have been produced by subduction of the Juan de Fuca tectonic plate under the North American Plate. The Washington Cascades consist of Cenozoic era volcanic and intrusive rocks, and they can be divided into two segments based on age and rock type: the Western Cascades (formed between 50 and 5 million years ago) and the High Cascades (produced within the past 5 million years). Whereas the High Cascades have largely been unaffected by geological deformation processes, the Western Cascades are more folded and faulted.

In the Wind River area, the Cascades sit atop Cenozoic era lava flows and volcaniclastic deposits, which have a calc-alkaline composition. Divided into the Ohanapecosh Formation, Eagle Creek Formation (Washington), Yakima Basalt, and Quaternary basalt flows, they show variable thickness and topographies. The Cascade Arc formed during the Oligocene epoch, and by the late Miocene epoch there was a low but broad gap between the Washington segment of the arc and Cascade volcanoes in Oregon. Activity picked up during the Quaternary period in Washington, as andesitic stratovolcanoes and small, olivine basalt cinder cones and shield volcanoes erupted. Before the Pleistocene, uplift and erosion was widespread, which was followed by eruptions from the northeastern part of the Wind River area during the early Pleistocene.

Rocks in the Wind River area have not been altered significantly by orogenic movement (large structural deformation of the Earth's crust and uppermost mantle due to the interaction between plate tectonics). There are a number of faults, but they show relatively little displacement. The western slope of the Wind River valley is shaped like a fault scarp, and it seems to be aligned with Trout Creek Hill, suggesting a potential fault line there that trends to the northwest. West Crater may also be part of this fault, as both it and Trout Creek Hill appear to be aligned with the lower Wind River and St. Martin's Hot Springs.

West Crater forms part of the Quaternary Marble Mountain-Trout Creek Hill volcanic field in southern Washington state, formed by small basaltic and basaltic andesite shield volcanoes and cinder cones. This field encompasses an area of 12 miles (20 km), running from Marble Mountain to the area to the south of Trout Creek Hill. Located south of Mount St. Helens, it extends for 40 miles (65 km) and has a width of 12 miles (20 km). It consists of mostly monogenetic scoria cones, each of which produced three or four lava flows. There are at least 22 cones, and all volcanic landforms older than 12,000 years have been glaciated, the oldest the Soda Peaks basalt lava flows, dated to 0.36 million years old.

The West Crater-Soda Peaks zone covers an area of 39 square miles (100 km^{2}), 22 miles (35 km) to the southeast of Mount St. Helens. A monogenetic volcanic field, it consists of 13 basaltic to andesitic volcanic edifices that vary from 360,000 years old to 2,000 years old. They appear as a series of isolated lava flows emplaced as single units, except for the deposits at Bare Mountain, South Soda Peaks, and West Crater where deposits are more complex.

West Crater is a small lava dome, made up of andesitic lava with two large lava flows. It is not highly prominent. The volcanic edifice has a ridge of Tertiary volcanic and intrusive rock, which lies on the southern edge of West Crater. West Crater's dome reaches an elevation of 950 feet (290 m), with a diameter of 3,166 feet (965 m). It has a summit crater with a width of 660 feet (200 m) and a depth of 79 feet (24 m). The dome still possesses a lobe of lava at the bottom of this summit crater. West Crater's lava dome formed on the floor of a glacial cirque, and has a similar size to the lava dome formed after the 1980 eruption of Mount St. Helens.

== Eruptive history ==
West Crater has erupted at least two large lava flows since Quaternary time, each of which extend about 2 miles (3.2 km) from the volcano. Emplaced into canyons on the sides of the crater, the flows have just started to be eroded by local streams. The flows have a gray color, and they consist of a platy, olivine basalt lava interspersed with olivine phenocrysts. The western flow has ridges perpendicular to its flow with heights of 9.8 feet (3 m), as well as two levees that reach heights of 49 feet (15 m) which span 0.31 miles (0.5 km) of the deposit. The eastern flow has at least ten subunits with a rough surface; it was more viscous than the western flow. Both deposits have impeded soil development. In addition to the lava flows, hornblende andesite can also be found near West Crater to the northwest of the Trout Creek Hill.

Scientists think West Crater erupted during the Holocene epoch, about 8,000 years before present. Its lava flows intermix with tephra from an eruption of Mount St. Helens and tephra from the climactic eruption of Mount Mazama about 7,700 years ago. Within the Marble Mountain-Trout Creek Hill field, only two other volcanoes have erupted during the Holocene: the volcanic cone near Hackamore Creek and a phreatic crater at Bare Mountain's summit. These cones were likely active simultaneously, as one of the lava flows from West Crater is embedded with an andesitic lava flow from the Hackamore Creek cone. Their similar ages and locations imply that they resulted from the same movement of magma and were possibly fed by the same magma chambers.

The lava dome likely formed before the lava flows erupted, suggested by its steep western side and the appearance of rock from the dome on the western lava flow. The dome's 20-foot (6 m) deep depression may have formed when the dome's top collapsed as lava moved out of the volcano during the eruption of the two flows.

=== Potential hazards ===
The human population within 6.2 miles (10 km) of West Crater is slightly more than 500 people, but more than 14,000 people live within 19 miles (30 km) of the volcano, and more than 2 million live within 62 miles (100 km). However, the United States Geological Survey lists the threat potential from West Crater as "Low/Very Low".

== Recreation ==
West Crater can be reached by traveling northwest on Wind River Road to Stabler and then following Forest Road 54 to Forest Road 34 before traveling a mile to the left. The lightly used Trail #155 West Crater runs through the area for 0.39 miles (0.63 km), though it can only be hiked; use of bicycles and motorized vehicles on the trail is prohibited.

== Notes ==
- [a] Other sources list the elevation of the mountain as roughly 4,100 feet (1,200 m) or 4,359 feet (1,329 m).

== Bibliography ==
- Hammond, P. E.; Pedersen, S. A.; Hopkins, K. D.; Aiken, D.; Harle, D. S.; Danes, Z. F.; Konicek, D. L.; Stricklin, C. R. (1976). Geology and gravimetry of the Quaternary basaltic volcanic field, southern Cascade Range, Washington. Proceedings of the 2nd United Nations Symposium on the Development and Use of Geothermal Resources. Vol. 1. San Francisco: United States Government Publishing Office. pp. 397–405.
- Harris, S. L. (2005). Fire Mountains of the West: The Cascade and Mono Lake Volcanoes (3rd ed.). Mountain Press Publishing Company. ISBN 0-87842-511-X.
- Polivka, D. R. (1984). Quaternary volcanology of the West Crater-Soda Peaks area, southern Washington Cascade Range (Thesis). Portland State University.
- Wise, W. S. (1970). "Cenozoic volcanism in the Cascade Mountains of southern Washington". Washington Department of Natural Resources Bulletin. 60. Washington Department of Natural Resources: 1–45.
- Wood, C. A.; Kienle, J., eds. (1990). Volcanoes of North America. Cambridge University Press. ISBN 0-521-43811-X.
