= Enumclaw horse sex case =

American legal case

- Location of Enumclaw, Washington State
- Date: July 2, 2005; 21 years ago
- Location: Unincorporated area in King County, Washington, United States (near Enumclaw)
- Type: Bestiality
- Cause: Cause of death: Acute peritonitis caused by traumatic perforation of the colon
- Participants: Kenneth Pinyan (Mr. Hands); James Michael Tait; A stallion
- Outcome: Laws passed criminalizing bestiality and zoophilic pornography in Washington state
- Deaths: 1 (Pinyan)
- Convicted: James Michael Tait
- Verdict: Tait: Pleaded guilty
- Convictions: Tait: First-degree criminal trespass
- Sentence: Tait: One-year suspended sentence

The Enumclaw horse sex case was a series of incidents in 2005 involving Kenneth D. Pinyan, an engineer who worked for Boeing and resided in Gig Harbor, Washington; James Michael Tait, a truck driver; and other unidentified men. Pinyan and Tait filmed and distributed zoophilic pornography of Pinyan receiving anal sex from a stallion under the alias "Mr. Hands". After engaging in this activity on multiple occasions over an unknown span of time, Pinyan received fatal internal injuries in one such incident.

The story was reported in The Seattle Times and was one of that paper's most read stories of 2005. As zoophilia had inadvertently been made legal in Washington state at the time following the repeal of sodomy laws, Tait could only be charged with trespassing. He was convicted and sentenced to a one-year suspended sentence.

The case rapidly prompted the enactment of a bill by the Washington State Legislature that prohibits both bestiality and the videotaping of such an act. Under current Washington law, it is now a Class C felony punishable by up to five years in prison.

== Background ==
In the 1970s, many statutes that had criminalized certain sex acts in various U.S. states were repealed, largely since they had criminalized some consensual sex acts between adults that were no longer considered appropriate to forbid (e.g., criminalizing all oral and anal sex). In Washington state, a law was repealed on July 1, 1976, that had said:

Every person who shall carnally know in any manner any animal or bird, or who shall carnally know any male or female person by the anus or with the mouth or tongue; or who shall voluntarily submit to such knowledge; or who shall attempt sexual intercourse with a dead body, shall be guilty of sodomy...

— 9.79.100 of the 1974 Revised Code of Washington

An effect of the repeal was that bestiality became legal in the state of Washington.

Kenneth Pinyan had worked for Boeing for eight years. He had previously been married to a woman and had children with her. He had moved from Seattle to Oak Harbor, Washington. Pinyan had been building a new house and a barn that he planned to keep a horse in, along the Key Peninsula Highway in Gig Harbor, Washington. He was about to begin making payments on the property's mortgage.

Pinyan had previously lost the ability to experience certain sensations after a motorcycle accident, and he had begun to seek out increasingly extreme sexual acts such as insertion of extremely large dildos, fisting, and receptive anal sex with horses. In the early 2000s, he found a group of men online, nicknamed "zoos", who began meeting at a farm in an unincorporated area of King County, Washington, for communal weekends. The group filmed one another being anally penetrated by horses and sometimes engaged in sex with each other afterwards (which was also filmed), and posted the videos online. According to Charles Mudede, co-writer of the 2007 documentary film Zoo, the men trained the horses to penetrate them by stripping, applying a horse breeding pheromone, and bending over. In 2015, Mudede wrote that the men had a sexual fixation on large penises "that may have had nothing to do with horses". He also believed Pinyan did not truly love horses and was not a true zoophile, although Pinyan had a cast created of the penis of his favorite horse, Strut.

== Pinyan's death ==
Kenneth Pinyan in an undated photo

The incident that killed Pinyan occurred at a 40-acre (16 ha) farm located in an unincorporated area in King County, Washington, 5 miles (8.0 km) northwest of the city of Enumclaw. Sgt. John Urquhart of the Sheriff's Office said that "typically", men were sexually involved with a horse whose name was not publicly disclosed on the property of James Michael Tait, a truck driver who lived in a trailer next to the farm, "but on this particular night it is my understanding that horse wasn't particularly receptive". Pinyan, Tait, and a third unidentified man snuck into the barn of the Southeast 444th Street farm that night. Either Pinyan or the unidentified man recorded Tait being anally penetrated by a stallion the men had referred to as "Big Dick". After finishing, Tait then filmed Pinyan being anally penetrated by the same horse. During this incident, Pinyan sustained internal injuries including a perforated colon.

On July 2, 2005, Pinyan was dropped off anonymously at the Enumclaw Community Hospital. Medical staff wheeled Pinyan into an examination room before realizing he was dead. According to the Medical Examiner's Office, Pinyan, 45, "died of acute peritonitis due to perforation of the colon", and the death was ruled accidental.

== Investigation ==
After Pinyan died, the authorities used his driver's license to find acquaintances and relatives. Earlier news reports stated that the authorities had used surveillance camera footage to track down Pinyan's companion. Using the contacts, the authorities found the farm where the incident occurred. The police tracked down the rural Enumclaw-area farm, which was known in zoophile chat rooms as a destination for people wanting to have sex with livestock, and seized 100 VHS tapes and DVDs amounting to hundreds of hours of video of men engaging in bestiality. One of the videotapes featured Kenneth Pinyan shortly before he died on July 2.

Prosecutors later determined that the horse had not been injured.

It was only after Pinyan died, when law enforcement looked for one way to punish his associates, that the legality of bestiality in Washington State became an issue [...] The prosecutor's office wanted to charge Tait with animal abuse, but the police found no evidence of abused animals on the many videotapes they collected from his home. As there was no law against humanely fucking a horse, the prosecutors could only charge Tait with trespassing.

— Charles Mudede, The Stranger

The prosecutor's office says no animal cruelty charges were filed because there was no evidence of injury to the horses.

— Associated Press in The Seattle Times

== Media reporting ==
Jennifer Sullivan, a Seattle Times staff reporter, said that originally the King County Sheriff's Department did not expect the local newspapers to report on the event because of its gruesome nature. However, after an Associated Press report stated that the farm where the event occurred attracted a significant number of people who sought to partake in bestiality, the Times decided that it needed to write articles about the case as multiple people were involved.

== State of Washington v. James Michael Tait ==
The videographer in the case, 54-year-old James Michael Tait, was charged in the case of State of Washington v. James Michael Tait with criminal trespass in the first degree – the owners of the farm, a third party, were not aware that the men had entered the property to engage in bestiality. The third man was not charged since he was not visible in the videos seized by investigators. On November 29, 2005, Tait entered an Alford plea. (Note: In an Alford plea, the accused maintains that they are factually innocent but acknowledges that the evidence would likely lead to conviction and hence formally accepts conviction.) Judge David Christie gave him a suspended one-year sentence, a $300 fine, one day of community service, and ordered Tait never to visit the farm again.

== Aftermath ==
Charles Mudede wrote that at the time of the incident, the residents of Enumclaw were shocked and angered by the event. In 2015, ten years after the incident, he wrote that Enumclaw residents were still unwilling to acknowledge what had happened.

=== "2 Guys 1 Horse" ===
Footage of Pinyan's first sexual encounter with a horse, where he, with the help of another person, receives rear-entry position anal sex from a male horse, began to circulate on the Internet after his death. The video is often incorrectly mistaken for Pinyan's last sexual encounter with a horse called Big Dick. The video was nicknamed "Mr. Hands" or "2 Guys 1 Horse". The video, intended originally to sexually gratify the viewer, became one of the Internet's first viral shock videos and was featured in the documentary Zoo.

=== Zoo ===
A documentary of the life and death of Pinyan, and the lives led by those who came to the farm near Enumclaw, debuted at the 2007 Sundance Film Festival under the title Zoo. It was one of 16 winners out of 856 candidates for the festival, and played at numerous regional festivals in the U.S. thereafter. Following Sundance, it was also selected as one of the top five American films to be presented at the prestigious Directors Fortnight sidebar at the 2007 Cannes Film Festival.

=== James Michael Tait and later events of 2009–2010 ===
Some time after the events in Washington, James Michael Tait moved to Maury County, Tennessee, onto a farm owned by a man named Kenny Thomason housing horses, pigs, goats and dogs. Tennessee explicitly banned bestiality with the enactment of Tennessee Code § 39-14-214, which took effect on July 1, 2007, making it a Class E felony punishable by up to six years in prison and a fine of up to $3,000. Despite this, Tait did not relocate to another state that decriminalized bestiality, like he had done with Washington. On October 13, 2009, a woman associated with them, Christy D. Morris, was arrested and charged with three counts of animal cruelty. Two days later, an anonymous person e-mailed investigators a photo of a man having sex with a Shetland pony from Thomason's farm; Tait and Thomason were arrested that same day. Tait was charged with three counts of felony animal cruelty, while Thomason was charged with two. According to Tait's arrest warrant, he had been engaging in sex acts with a stud horse over a span of several months. Tait and Thomason admitted to engaging in sex acts with a horse. In January 2010, Tait pleaded guilty in a Tennessee court to engaging in sexual acts with animals and was placed on probation.

=== Section 16.52.205 of the Revised Code of Washington ===
After Pinyan died, a Washington state senator, Pam Roach, crafted a bill to ban bestiality in Washington State. Senate Bill 6417, which made bestiality a Class C felony, passed on February 11, 2006. Mudede wrote "It was an almost comically easy law to pass" as bestiality had little political support in Washington and no group in the state actively advocated for bestiality to be legal. Mudede wrote that reading RCW 16.52.205 was "very much like reading hardcore porn". The law prohibits "videotap[ing] a person engaged in a sexual act or sexual contact with an animal" that is "either alive or dead". Because of the provision against videotaping, Mudede stated that the law "points an angry finger directly at James Tait." In 2015, Mudede said that he was unaware of any bestiality arrests in Washington since the Pinyan incident. However, in 2010, there was a case in Whatcom County where a convicted drug smuggler under supervised release, Douglas Spink, was arrested for running what was described as a "bestiality farm" along with another man, English national Stephen Clarke; Spink was only charged with violating his supervised release terms, while Clarke was charged with bestiality under the new law. Spink was first investigated following a tip-off caused by his incessant phone calls to a Tennessee public defender's office, where he kept asking about then-detained James Tait.

== See also ==
- List of horse accidents
- List of unusual deaths in the 21st century
