= Trout Creek Hill =

Mountain in United States of America

- Location within Washington (state)

Highest point
- Elevation: 2,946 feet (898 m)
- Coordinates: 45°50′11″N 121°59′41″W

Geography
- Location: Skamania County, Washington, US
- Parent range: Cascade Range
- Topo map: USGS Stabler

Geology
- Rock age: Pleistocene
- Mountain type: Shield volcano
- Volcanic field: Marble Mountain-Trout Creek Hill
- Last eruption: 340,000 years ago

Trout Creek Hill is a small Pleistocene basaltic shield volcano in Washington, United States. Located in Skamania County, Trout Creek Hill rises to an elevation of 2,946 feet (898 m). It is part of the Cascade Volcanic Arc, located in the Marble Mountain-Trout Creek Hill volcanic field.

Trout Creek Hill produced a lava flow about 340,000 years ago that traveled 20 km (12 mi) southeast, which dammed the Columbia River for a short period of time. A shield volcano, it has two cinder cones atop it. The nearby area is forested and hosts the Wind River Experimental Forest, and it can be hiked.

== Geography and access ==
Located in Skamania County in Washington state, in the United States, Trout Creek Hill rises to an elevation of 2,946 feet (898 m).^{[a]} It is also known as Trout Hill, and was registered with the United States Geographic Names Information System in 1979. The region has a "rugged" topography carved by glaciers and cirques, which have created glacial valleys.

Trout Creek Hill and the rest of the Marble Mountain–Trout Creek Hill field can be accessed by roads in the Gifford Pinchot National Forest and Mount St. Helens National Volcanic Monument. Washington Route 503 and Forest Service Route 90 lie 31 miles (50 km) to the east of Woodland. To reach Trout Creek Hill, visitors should travel north on the Wind River highway and follow Forest Service road 54.

== Ecology ==
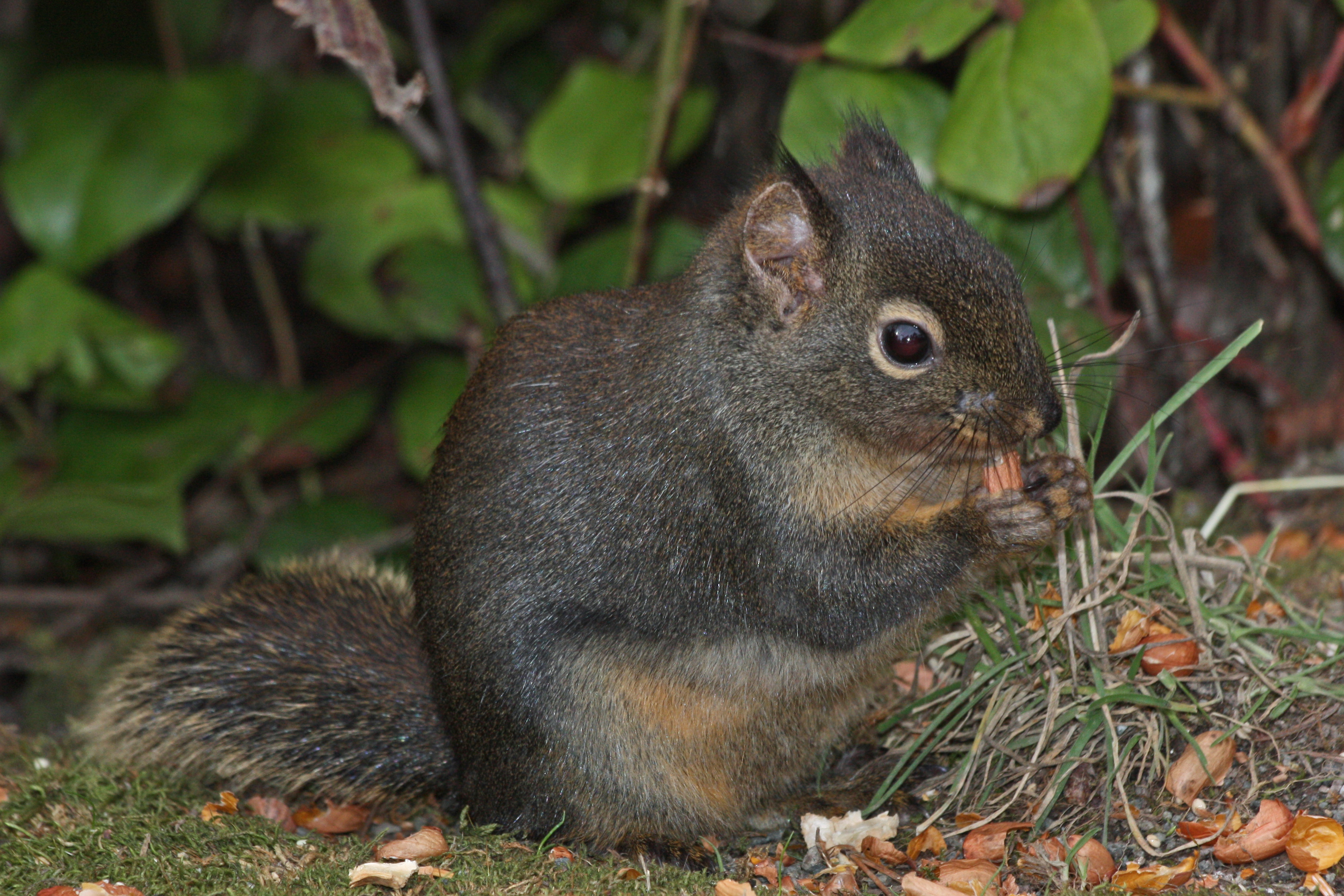
The Douglas squirrel can be frequently seen in the forested area around Trout Creek Hill.

The area around Trout Creek Hill contains the Wind River Experimental Forest, which contains Western hemlock, Douglas fir, and Pacific silver fir. Known as "the cradle of forest research in the Pacific Northwest", the Wind River Forest represents a center for ecological research. It lies east of Vancouver, Washington, and it is administered by the United States Forest Service Pacific Northwest Research Station and the Gifford Pinchot National Forest. The forest encloses ponds, streams, and wetland marshes, with other conifers present including grand firs, noble firs, and Pacific yews, western red cedars, as well as other tree species consisting of bigleaf maples, black cottonwoods, Pacific dogwoods, and red alders. Smaller plants include shrubs in the understory such as big huckleberry, Oregon grape, Pacific rhododendron, red huckleberry, salal, and vine maple. Other forest floor plants include the brackenfern, prince's pine, swordfern, trillium, twinflower, queencup beadlily, and vanilla leaf, with beargrass and huckleberry at higher elevations.

As far as animal life, forest visitors often see Douglas squirrels, though nine species of bats, three shrew species, three vole species, one species of flying squirrel, and Townsend's chipmunks can also be seen less frequently. Black-tailed deer and elk are often hunted by predator species. Predators in the forest area consist of American black bears, bobcats, cougars, coyotes, martens, and weasels. Bird species include brown creepers; dark-eyed juncos; goshawks; hairy woodpeckers; Northern spotted owls, which are a threatened species; pileated woodpeckers; red-breasted nuthatches; and winter wrens. In the Trout and Panther Creeks, rainbow trout are residents throughout the year, as are summer and winter steelhead, the only anadromous (migratory) fish in the streams. Eastern brook trout only inhabit Trout Creek.

== Geology ==
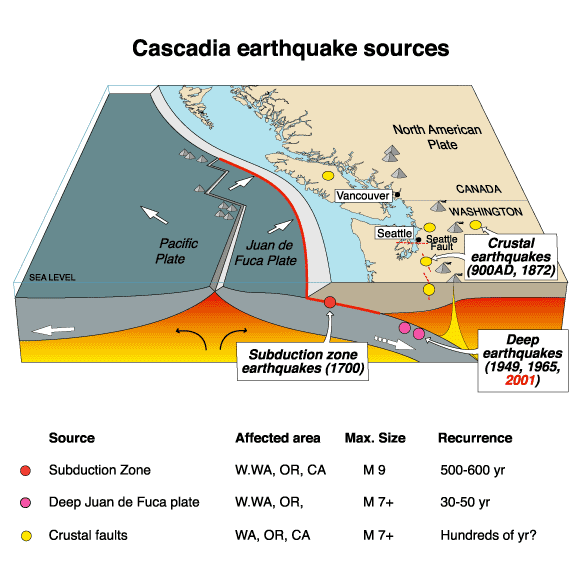
The Juan de Fuca tectonic plate is being subducted under the North American Plate, leading to volcanic activity in the Cascades like at Trout Creek Hill.

In southern Washington state, the Cascade Range sits south of the dacitic volcanic belt running from Mount Garibaldi to Lassen Peak, which spans 600 miles (970 km) from British Columbia in Canada to northern California in the United States. Volcanoes in the range have been produced by subduction of the Juan de Fuca tectonic plate under the North American Plate. The Washington Cascades consist of Cenozoic era volcanic and intrusive rocks, and they can be divided into two segments based on age and rock type: the Western Cascades (formed between 50 and 5 million years ago) and the High Cascades (produced within the past 5 million years). Whereas the High Cascades have largely been unaffected by geological deformation processes, the Western Cascades are more folded and faulted.

In the Wind River area, the Cascades sit atop Cenozoic era lava flows and volcaniclastic deposits, which have a calc-alkaline composition. Divided into the Ohanapecosh Formation, Eagle Creek Formation, Yakima Basalt, and Quaternary basalt flows, they show variable thickness and topographies. The Cascade Arc formed during the Oligocene epoch, and by the late Miocene epoch there was a low but broad gap between the Washington segment of the arc and Cascade volcanoes in Oregon. Activity picked up during the Quaternary period in Washington, as andesitic stratovolcanoes and small, olivine basalt cinder cones and shield volcanoes erupted. Before the Pleistocene, uplift and erosion was widespread, which was followed by eruptions from the northeastern part of the Wind River area during the early Pleistocene. Like Red Mountain, a shield volcano with cinder cones, Trout Creek Hill formed west of the Wind River area.

Rocks in the Wind River area have not been altered significantly by orogenic movement (large structural deformation of the Earth's crust and uppermost mantle due to the interaction between plate tectonics). There are a number of faults, but they show relatively little displacement. The western slope of the Wind River valley is shaped like a fault scarp, and it seems to be aligned with Trout Creek Hill, suggesting a potential fault line there that trends to the northwest. However, the six or seven emplaced lava flow deposits in the area only show small amounts of alteration to the west of the valley, and they show no alteration to the east. Moreover, there are only three significantly altered deposits along the Bear Creek.

Trout Creek Hill lies in the Quaternary Marble Mountain-Trout Creek Hill volcanic field in southern Washington state, formed by small basaltic and basaltic andesite shield volcanoes and cinder cones. This field runs from Marble Mountain to the area to the south of Trout Creek Hill. Located south of Mount St. Helens, it extends for 40 miles (65 km) and has a width of 12 miles (20 km). It consists of mostly monogenetic scoria cones, each of which produced three or four lava flows. There are at least 22 cones, and all volcanic landforms older than 12,000 years have been glaciated, the oldest the Soda Peaks basalt lava flows, dated to 0.36 million years old.

Trout Creek is a shield volcano. Small in size, it is topped by two nearby cinder cones that produced dark gray olivine basalt lava flows with glomeroporphyritic olivine inclusions. Hornblende andesite can also be found northwest of the Trout Creek Hill volcano, near West Crater.

== Eruptive history ==
Trout Creek Hill erupted approximately 340,000 years ago during the Pleistocene, producing a lava flow that extended 12 miles (20 km) to the southeast and temporarily dammed the Columbia River. This eruption produced high-alumina olivine basalt, which make up the shield volcano and possess a dark gray color. Lava flows from the two cinder cones on Trout Creek Hill did not move far to the west from their source vents, instead moving to the southeast down the Wind River Valley into the Columbia River and around Bunker Hill. Within Wind River valley, these deposits reach depths of more than 325 feet (99 m) at the Bear Creek, Panther Creek, and Wind River junction; the shorter flows that extended to the west likely exceed thicknesses of 200 feet (61 m) with lengths of 1.5 miles (2.4 km). Other lava flows from Trout Creek Hill are also embedded with till from Salmon Springs and Fraser Glaciation, but their exact age is unknown. Basaltic lavas from Trout Creek Hill show a lithology of pāhoehoe to blocky olivine, with pyroxene, breccia, scoria, and cinder deposits.

Within the Marble Mountain–Trout Creek Hill field, there have been three eruptions during the Holocene epoch: at West Crater, another cone near Hackamore Creek, and a phreatic vent (producing steam and rock fragments) near Bare Mountain. These all took place about 8,000 years ago. The West Crater eruption generated an andesitic lava dome and lava flow, while the Bare Mountain vent formed a large explosion crater at Bare Mountain.

== Recreation ==
While overnight facilities at Wind River Forest can only be used by researchers, there is camping permitted at the Panther Creek and Beaver campgrounds on the Gifford Pinchot National Forest area. Their popularity means that reservations are often necessary. Motels are also available in Carson and Stevenson, as are restaurants. The Pacific Crest National Scenic Trail #2000 can be hiked, moving through the Trout Creek division of Wind River Forest. Whistle Punk Trail 59 runs for 1.5 miles (2.4 km) through young forest area near the experimental forest, with a short span of old-growth forest. It offers views of logging artifacts and an old railroad. Sedum Point, located along part of the Pacific Crest Trail, offers views of the Trout Creek Hill volcano.

== Notes ==
- [a] Other sources list the elevation of the mountain as 2,930 feet (893 m).

== Sources ==
- Adams, T. C. (1980). Logging costs for a trial of intensive residue removal (PDF). United States Forest Service.
- Hammond, P. E.; Pedersen, S. A.; Hopkins, K. D.; Aiken, D.; Harle, D. S.; Danes, Z. F.; Konicek, D. L.; Stricklin, C. R. (1976). Geology and gravimetry of the Quaternary basaltic volcanic field, southern Cascade Range, Washington. Vol. 1. San Francisco: United States Government Publishing Office. pp. 397–405.
- Polivka, D. R. (1984). Quaternary volcanology of the West Crater-Soda Peaks area, southern Washington Cascade Range (Thesis). Portland State University.
- Romano, C. (2011). Day Hiking Columbia River Gorge: National Scenic Area/Silver Star Scenic Area/Portland–Vancouver to The Dalles. The Mountaineers Books.
- Wind River Experimental Forest (PDF). United States Forest Service. May 2003.
- Wise, W. S. (1970). "Cenozoic volcanism in the Cascade Mountains of southern Washington". Washington Department of Natural Resources Bulletin. 60. Washington Department of Natural Resources: 1–45.
- Wood, C. A.; Kienle, J., eds. (1990). Volcanoes of North America. Cambridge University Press. ISBN 0-521-43811-X.
