= Boise Ridge =

Mountain in Washington (state), United States

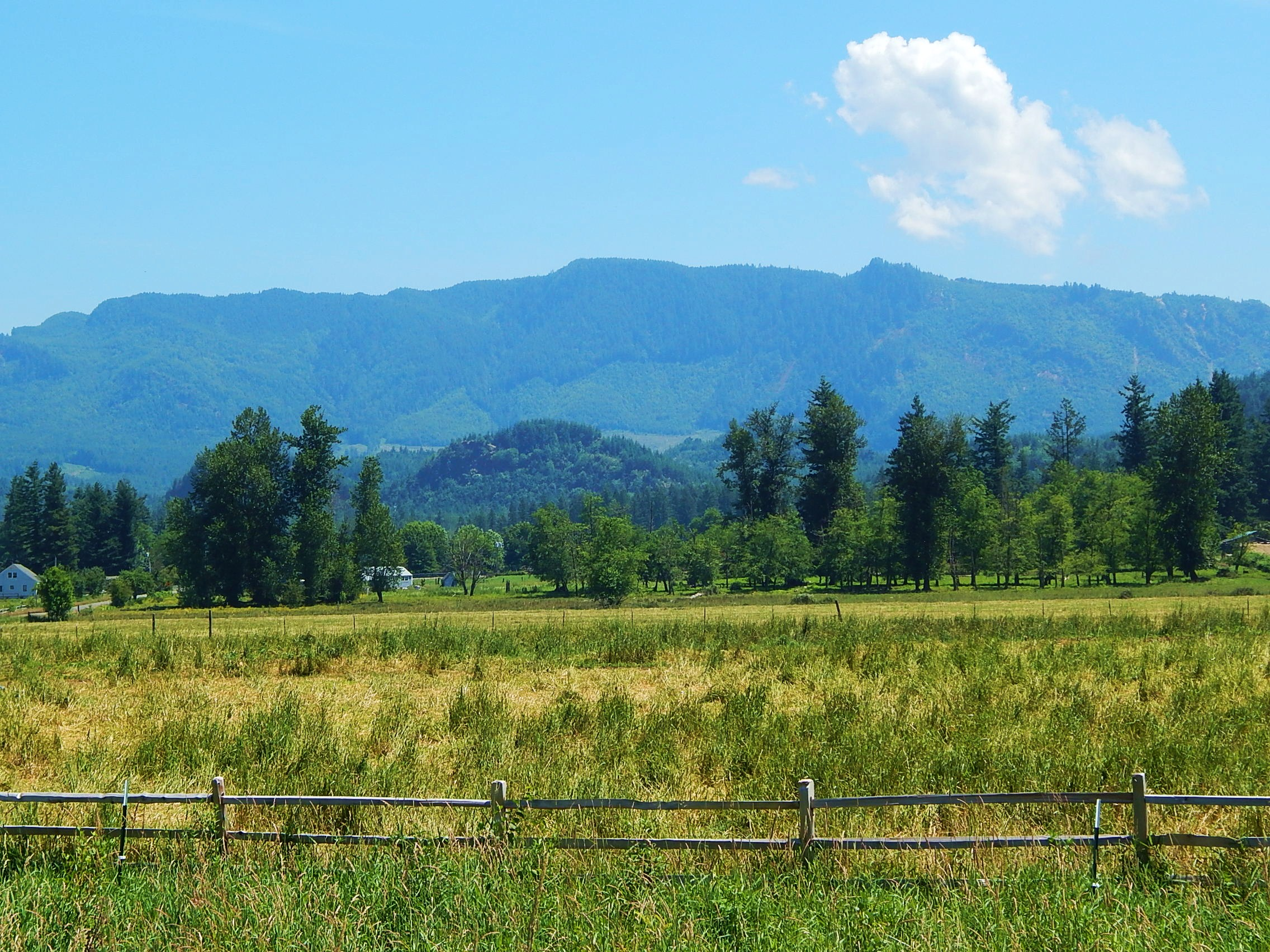
- Boise Ridge seen from the west

Highest point
- Elevation: 3,080 ft (939 m)
- Prominence: 420 ft (128 m)
- Coordinates: 47°13′06″N 121°53′33″W

Geography
- Location within Washington (state) Location within the United States
- Country: United States
- State: Washington
- County: King
- Parent range: Cascade Range
- Topo map: USGS Enumclaw

Climbing
- Easiest route: Hiking class 2

Boise Ridge is a north–south trending forested ridge located in King County of Washington state. It is part of the Cascade Range and is set at the western edge of the range. Boise Ridge is situated four miles east of Enumclaw, Washington, west of Grass Mountain, south of Enumclaw Mountain, and north of Radio Hill. Precipitation runoff on the east side of the ridge drains into Boise Creek, a tributary of the White River, whereas the west side drains into Newaukum Creek, a tributary of the Green River.

== Climate ==
Boise Ridge is located in the marine west coast climate zone of western North America. Weather fronts originating in the Pacific Ocean travel northeast toward the Cascade Mountains. As fronts approach, they are forced upward by the peaks of the Cascade Range, causing them to drop their moisture in the form of rain or snow onto the Cascades (Orographic lift). As a result, the west side of the Cascades experiences high precipitation, especially during the winter months in the form of snowfall. During winter months, weather is usually cloudy, but, due to high pressure systems over the Pacific Ocean that intensify during summer months, there is often little or no cloud cover during the summer.
