= Logging Legacy Memorial =

Timber industry memorial in Enumclaw, Washington

- Artist: Dan Snider
- Medium: Bronze sculpture
- Location: Enumclaw, Washington
- 47°12′11.2″N 121°59′17.6″W

The Logging Legacy Memorial is a memorial and public art installation commemorating the timber industry, installed in Enumclaw, Washington. The memorial includes a bronze sculpture by Dan Snider of a pair of oxen and a drover pulling a log.
