= Douglas Spink =

American zoophile advocate and criminal (1971–2020)

- Born: Douglas Bryan Spink; March 17, 1971; Pittsburgh, Pennsylvania, U.S.
- Died: January 23, 2020 (aged 48)
- Other name: Fausty
- Education: Reed College (BA); University of Chicago (MBA)
- Occupations: Entrepreneur; drug trafficker
- Criminal charges: Drug trafficking, animal cruelty

Douglas Bryan Spink (March 17, 1971 – January 23, 2020) was an American advocate for zoophilia known for a combination of criminal activities, including smuggling drugs between the Canada–United States border and allegedly running a farm for people to engage in bestiality.

== Early life ==
Spink was born in Pittsburgh on March 17, 1971, the second child of Jack and Claire Spink. He grew up in Fox Chapel, Pennsylvania. He was "raised in a horse-centric environment" and learned to ride horses at a young age. He enjoyed fox hunting and showed early interest in horse-jumping competitions.

Spink earned a Bachelor of Arts in cultural anthropology from Reed College in 1993 and a Master of Business Administration from the University of Chicago in summer 1994. In 2000, he was working toward a Doctor of Philosophy in systems science at Portland State University, where he was studying quantitative theories of consciousness.

Spink began his career in 1994 as a consultant with Boston Consulting Group and an analyst at the advertising company Leo Burnett. In the mid-to-late 1990s, he helped found and support several early Internet and technology companies in Oregon. Through the sale of several small businesses, he became a multimillionaire. Despite this, he declared bankruptcy in 2002.

== Criminal history ==
In late 2003, Spink moved to British Columbia and began smuggling cocaine and marijuana across the Canada–United States border as part of a conspiracy led by Robert Kesling, a regional drug lord. In 2005, he was apprehended when law enforcement stopped him in his SUV while he was transporting 372 pounds (169 kg) of cocaine, estimated at a value of $34 million (equivalent to $56 million in 2025). Because of his cooperation with investigators, he received a three-year prison sentence. After release, he was placed on parole. During the traffic stop, investigators noticed that Spink was "really concerned with" a female German shepherd that was with him and had stickers on his car relating to pro-zoophilia activism. Police commander Steve Clopp clarified they "didn't bother" with the odd behavior due to "more pressing concerns," namely the cocaine in the car.

In April 2010, investigators in Tennessee contacted Spink's probation officer to inform him that Spink had contacted zoophile James Michael Tait – known for his involvement in the 2005 Enumclaw horse sex case – to support him while he was on trial for a bestiality charge. On the morning of April 14, a 19-member SWAT team raided Spink's farm near Sumas, Washington for violating the parole of his 2005 arrest. They found seven large-breed dogs, four stallions, and thirteen mice. Authorities purported that the mice had their tails removed and were smothered in petroleum jelly, but journalist Carreen Maloney – author of the 2018 biography about Spink Uniquely Dangerous – believes this detail was a fabrication. Authorities suspected Spink was using the farm to allow men to have sex with his animals. While there, they arrested a man who was on the property and ultimately plead guilty to animal cruelty charges. On July 16, 2010, Spink was found guilty of violating his probation. He received a sentence of three years in federal prison and two years of probation. In late 2012, following his prison sentence, he was placed on parole with several conditions, including agreeing to regular checks of any hard drives for inappropriate pornographic material and refraining from voluntary contact with animals. Additionally, courts ordered him to "shut down all websites owned, operated, or under his control that promote or contain zoophilia, bestiality or any sexual act with animal[s]".

On February 21, 2014, Spink – living in a trailer on a farm near Port Townsend, Washington – allegedly abducted a dog named Ghengis from a neighboring dog breeder. (Note: Spink moved to this farm after meeting a bank robber in prison whose wife lived next to the dog breeder.) Spink had been feeding Ghengis for up to a year before its disappearance, and a hole was cut in the fence between the two properties. Two days later, the farm's owners called 911 to report that the neighbors were harassing them, eventually leading investigators to Spink. He was arrested on March 4, 2014, for violating the amended terms of his cocaine smuggling sentence, as he had a young dog at his residence – whose collar he was wearing – and had failed to register his address with his parole officer. Investigators additionally found that he had allegedly been boarding horses under an assumed name, including one which had previously been taken away. On May 9, 2014, he was sentenced to nine months in prison, "the longest sentence U.S. District Court Judge Ricardo Martinez could impose". After being released, he was sentenced to an additional three months for animal cruelty. In December 2014, Ghengis' owner sued Spink over the dog's disappearance, but as of 2016, the case remained unsolved.

On August 9, 2015, Spink was arrested in London, Ontario. He was improperly released from the detention center where he was held, rearrested a day later, and deported back to the United States on August 12. That September, he reentered Canada through Saskatchewan and eventually returned to Ontario. In November 2015, he was arrested in Port Stanley, Ontario when police responded to a fire at his friend's house; he resisted arrest and kicked out the window of a police car. On February 23, 2016, he was deported from Canada back to the United States. In November 2017, Spink – living in Butler, Pennsylvania – was arrested for aggravated assault, resisting arrest, and disorderly conduct. During the arrest, he held a machete to his dog's throat. In a plea deal, he was sentenced to 11 1/2 months in prison and two years of probation on reduced charges – two counts of resisting arrest with a weapon.

== Advocacy ==
In his early teens, Spink became "a lifelong (if imperfect) vegetarian". In the 1990s, he was involved with the environmentalist group Earth First!.

Spink was outspoken about his beliefs that animals can consent to sexual activity with humans. During a 2010 court case, his attorney explained: "He believes it's a sexual orientation and that the arguments against it are the same ones once made against homosexuality or miscegenation". Additionally, in a YouTube video, he discussed his 10-year romantic relationship with one of the horses on his farm.

In addition to his personal actions and advocacy, Spink worked on projects against "zoophobic bigots" to raise legal funds for defending his fellow "zoosexuals". In a 2014 interview, Spink stated of his public crimes: "A core precedent was set: No longer can zoophobes in this country batter and coerce people like me into silence with threats of violence."

== Personal life ==
Spink was at one time married and had relationships with men and women. In an interview, he indicated that he had been diagnosed with Asperger syndrome. He was known for his hobby of BASE jumping. Spink died from complications from cancer in his mother's home on January 23, 2020. Spink was engaged when he died.
