= Norse Peak Wilderness =

Wilderness area in central Washington

- IUCN category Ib (wilderness area)
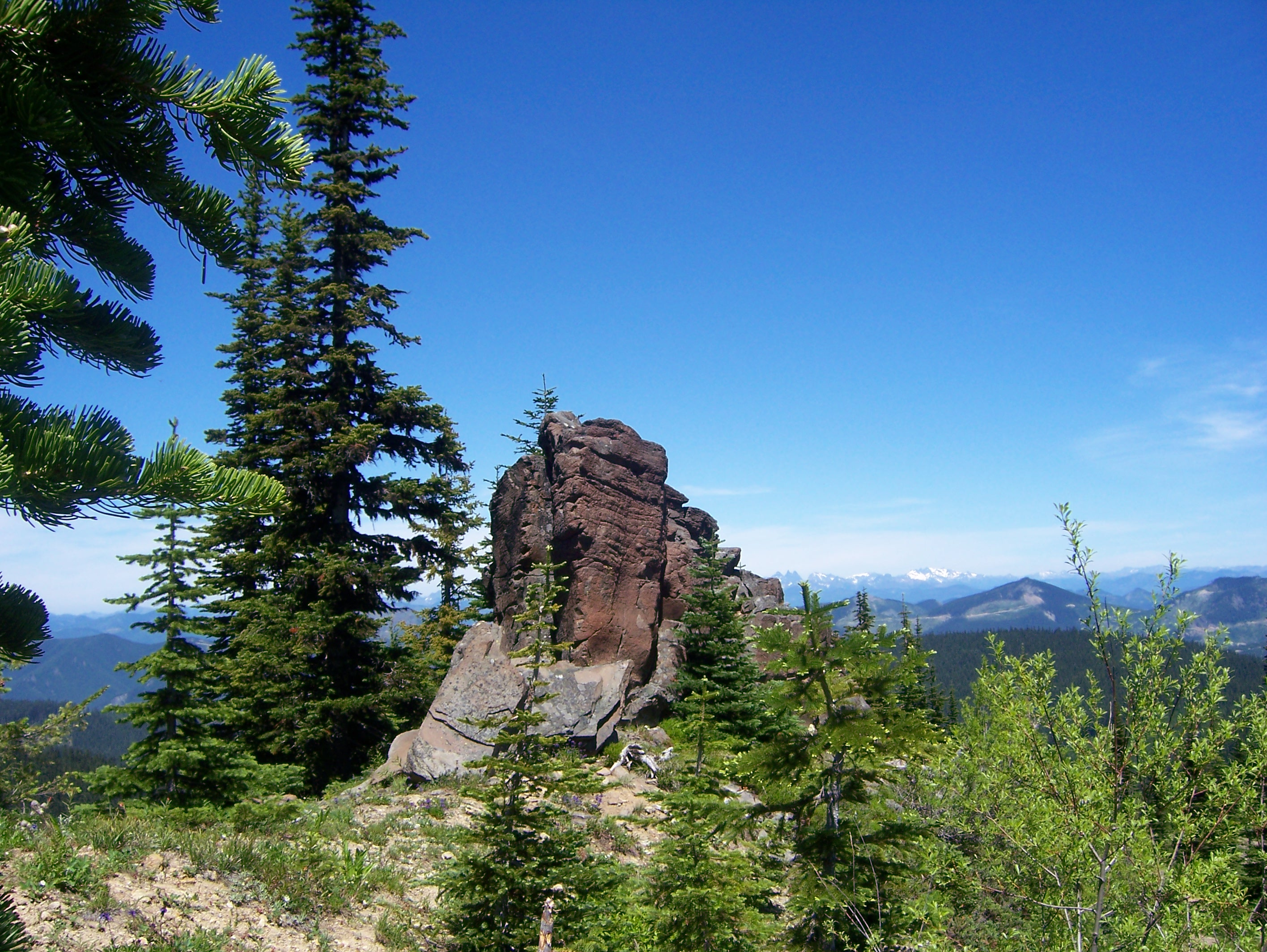
- View from the Lost Lake Trail in the Norse Peak Wilderness

- Location within the United States
- Location: Yakima / Pierce counties, Washington, United States
- Nearest city: Tacoma, WA
- Coordinates: 46°57′24″N 121°27′10″W
- Area: 52,315 acres (211.71 km^{2})
- Established: 1984
- Governing body: U.S. Forest Service

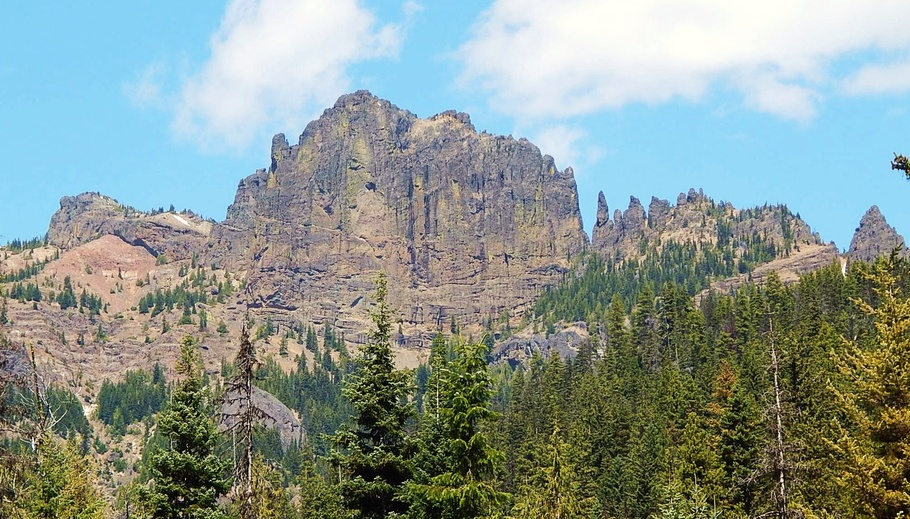
Fifes Peaks

Norse Peak Wilderness is a 52,315-acre (21,171 ha) designated wilderness area located in central Washington in the United States. It protects the portion of the Cascade Range north of Chinook Pass (Highway 410), south of Naches Pass (Naches Trail), and east of Mount Rainier National Park. It is bordered by the William O. Douglas Wilderness to the south. The wilderness is named for Norse Peak, a prominent peak which overlooks Crystal Mountain Ski Area. Roughly triangular, it is about 10 miles (16 km) across and contains no roads.

== History ==
The Norse Peak Wilderness was established by the 1984 Washington State Wilderness bill and is managed by the Mount Baker-Snoqualmie National Forest. This area was heavily grazed by domestic sheep between 1890 and 1950. The area south of Norse Peak Wilderness within Morse Creek drainage was once known as the Summit Mining District and was a popular mineral activity area between 1885 and 1920. The placer mineral content in this area was poor but historic remains of this earlier mining activity are still evident.

A 2017 wildfire blackened more than 50,000 acres, closing several forest roads and popular camp sites in the area.

== Geographic features ==
Norse Peak Wilderness is characterized by forested slopes and jutting volcanic peaks. The local streams flow through narrow valleys into lower elevation meadows. The topography includes broad open park-like basins at higher elevations. Elevations range from 3,000 feet (900 m) at the Greenwater River in the north to 6,856 foot (2090 m) Norse Peak in the west and 6900 foot (2100 m) Fifes Peaks, a prominent remnant volcanic cone in the east. The eastern portion is drained by tributaries of the Naches River.

The Pacific Crest National Scenic Trail follows closely the Cascade divide in the Norse Peak Wilderness. The historic Naches Pass Trail runs east and west just outside its northern boundary. Several additional trails provide access to other portions of the wilderness

== Flora and fauna ==
The wilderness hosts deer and elk in the basins and meadows, and a herd of goats range over the upper alpine peaks. The area is also home to cougar, coyote and black bear. It is also rumored to be home to grey wolf, though this has yet to be confirmed. Douglas fir, western red cedar, western hemlock and pine fill the forests, and the meadows are full of a variety of lesser growth. The undergrowth of the forest is dense and also varied.
