= Marble Mountain-Trout Creek Hill =

Volcanic field in Washington, United States

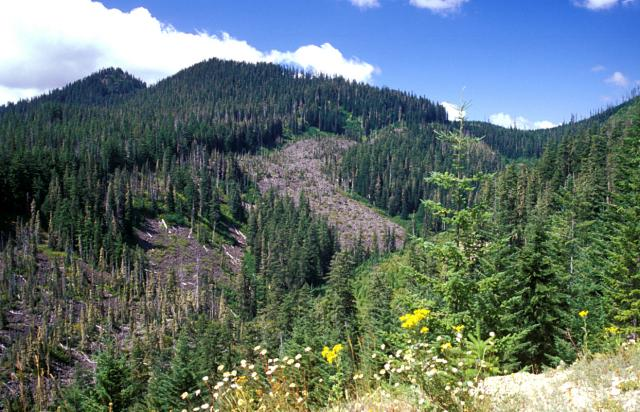
- West Crater with associated lava flows

Highest point
- Elevation: 492 to 4,521 ft (150 to 1,378 m)
- Coordinates: 45.9°N 122.0°W

Geography
- Location: Skamania County, Washington, United States
- Parent range: Cascade Range
- Topo map: USGS Bare Mountain

Geology
- Rock age: less than 700,000 years
- Mountain type: Volcanic field
- Volcanic arc: Cascade Volcanic Arc
- Last eruption: ~7,700 years BP

Marble Mountain-Trout Creek Hill volcanic field (MMTC) is a volcanic field located in Washington, US.

== Notable vents ==
| Name | Elevation | Coordinates | Last eruption |
| Bare Mountain | | | |
| Marble Mountain | 4,127 ft (1,258 m) | | |
| Trout Creek Hill | 2,930 ft (893 m) | 45°49′N 122°00′W | ~340,000 years ago |
| West Crater | 4,360 ft (1,329 m) | 45°53′N 122°05′W | ~6000 BC |

== Trout Creek Hill ==
Trout Creek Hill is a small Pleistocene basaltic shield volcano in Washington, United States. It produced a lava flow about 340,000 years ago that traveled 20 km (12 mi) southeast, which dammed the Columbia River for a short period of time.

== West Crater ==
West Crater is a small andesitic lava dome with associated lava flows in southern Washington.

== See also ==
- List of volcanoes in the United States
- List of volcanic fields
