= Fifes Peaks Formation =

- Stratigraphic range: Priabonian; ~36–28 Ma
- Type: Geological formation
- Underlies: Yakima Formation
- Overlies: Ohanapecosh Formation
- Area: 00 square kilometres (0 m^{2})
- Thickness: 00–00 m (0–0 ft)

Lithology
- Primary: andesite flow, tuff and breccia
- Other: volcanic Clastic rocks, pumice, lapilli, Phenocrysts, plagioclase

Location
- Coordinates: 28.6°N 97.7°W
- Approximate paleocoordinates: 29.0°N 95.3°W
- Region: King, & Kittatas counties, Washington
- Country: United States

Type section
- Named for: Fifes Peaks
- Fifes Peaks Formation (the United States) Fifes Peaks Formation (Washington (state))

== Description ==
Fifes Peaks Formation consists of flows that are vesicular, basaltic andesite. Weathering the rock creates shades of dark brown. The newly fractured blocks are medium- to dark-gray colors. Some flows are fine grained, most are porphyritic and contain glassy phenocrysts of plagioclase that weather to chalky-appearing clay. The flows are a few feet to several tens of feet (3–20 m), with columnar jointing common in the thicker flows. The breccias in the Fifes Peak are mostly shades of gray, purple, and red, with angular to subrounded rock fragments cemented by ash. The fragments are a few inches in dimension, rarely a foot long. They are mostly andesite porphyry, pumice, and glass. With fewer rock fragments, the breccias is a buff and tan. Pieces of petrified wood may be present. Bedding can be conspicuous but is often too massive to be identified.

=== Volcanic Clastic Rocks ===
Andesitic and basaltic flows and breccias over lye the Ohanapecosh Formation. In contrast, Hartman referred them to the Fifes Peak Formation. The Sun Top tuff (or Sun Top unit), an informal member of the Fifes Peak Formation. The Sun Top unit crops out on both sides of the White River at Sun Top and on Dalles Ridge.

An extra caldera flow from the Clear West Peak volcanic center is considered part of the Fifes Peak Formation. The flow consists of a silicified rhyolite tuff interbedded with the lavas from the Fifes Peak Formation. These beds are on the north side of the White River. Rocks in the Rimrock Lake-Mt. Rainier area of the Fifes Peak Formation ranges from 20 to 27 Ma in age, making the unit late Oligocene and early Miocene in age. In the Cougar Mountain and Mount Aix area, andesite lava of the Fifes Peak Formation are 22- to 24-Million years ago (Ma) whole (early Miocene). Near Snoqualmie Pass, the Sun Top unit of the Fifes Peak Formation range from about 20 to 24 Ma (Miocene).
