= Norse Peak =

Mountain in Washington, U.S.

Coordinates: 46°57′25″N 121°27′10″W

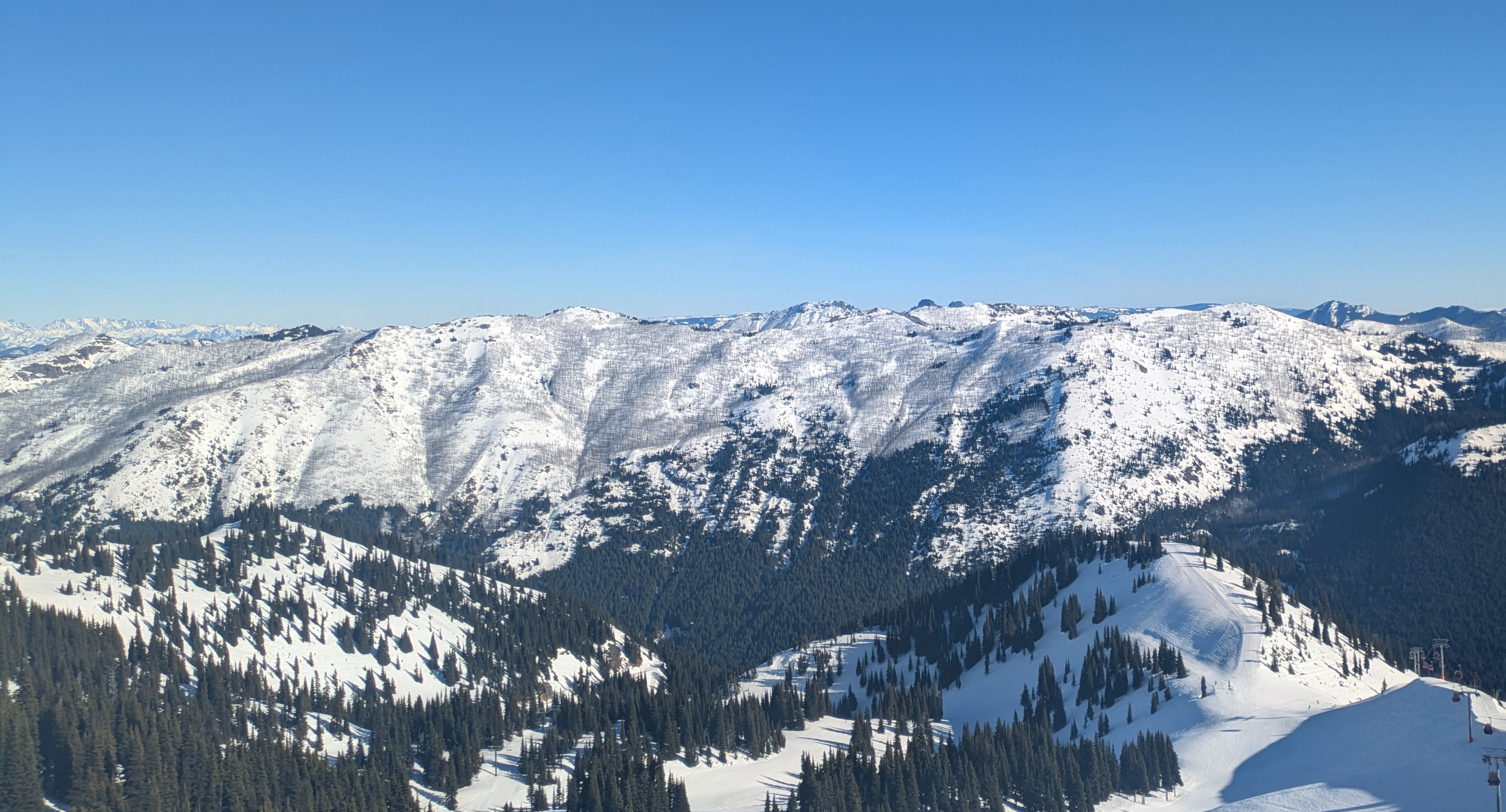
Dead trees from the 2017 fire standing in January 2025 on the western slopes of Norse Peak, viewed from Crystal Mountain

Norse Peak is a mountain in the Cascade Range of Washington state at an elevation of 6,856 feet (2,090 m) or 6,858 feet (2,090 m). It lies on the border between Pierce and Yakima counties east of Mount Rainier National Park.

From the summit, Mount Rainier, Mount Adams, Mount Stuart, Glacier Peak, the North Cascades, Mount Baker, and the Olympic Range can be seen on a clear day. The Crystal Mountain ski resort is located nearby, and both areas are accessed from the same road leading off of State Route 410. In summer, the resort offers a gondola ride that features views of Norse Peak. The summit was the site of a now decommissioned fire lookout. In the summer and early fall, Norse Peak is snow-free and can be accessed via trail 1191, which has been rerouted to prevent erosion. The Pacific Crest Trail passes just to the east of the peak. Described as dry and dusty, the hiking trail gains 2,800 feet (850 m) in 10.8 miles (17.4 km), and allows dogs and horses but has no water sources. The trail continues south near the ridgeline from Norse Peak and connects to the Bullion Basin trail. In the summer, there can be wildflowers as well as wildlife such as elk and mountain goats; in winter, the peak can be accessed via snowshoe or backcountry skiing, but carries a risk of avalanches. People who are ski touring can leave from the Crystal Mountain parking lot, with a roundtrip distance of 7 miles (11 km) to the summit. The Norse Peak Wilderness is bounded on the west by the north-south ridgeline that includes Norse Peak. The Norse Peak wildfire ignited in a lightning strike on August 11, 2017, and continued into late September, burning over 52,000 acres (21,000 ha) on the mountain and surrounding areas. The mountain is also the namesake of the Mountain Hardwear Norse Peak Hoody, a fleece jacket described by GearLab as "great for hanging out around the fire or chilling at the crag".
