= Enumclaw and Kapoonis =

Mythological twin brothers

Enumclaw and Kapoonis (/ˈiːnəmˌklɔː/ EE-nəm-KLAW) are mythological twin brothers of ostensible Pacific Northwest Native American origin who wanted to be great medicine men and sought the guardian spirit Sky Father's assistance. Enumclaw became so highly skilled at rock throwing and Kapoonis so highly skilled with fire that they frightened Sky Father with their aim and ferocity, so Sky Father changed Enumclaw into the thunder spirit and changed Kapoonis into the lightning spirit.

== See also ==
- Cherokee thunder beings, similar mythological figures
- Coast Salish peoples
- Salishan oral literature
- Indigenous peoples of the Pacific Northwest Coast
