= Ohanapecosh Formation =

Geologic formation in Washington, United States

- Stratigraphic range: Priabonian; ~36–28 Ma
- Type: Geological formation
- Sub-units: Chinook Pass association, White Pass association, Johnson Creek association
- Underlies: Pleistocene terrace deposits
- Overlies: Puget Group, Spiketon Formation, Renton Formation, & Naches Formation
- Area: >400 square kilometres (99,000 acres)
- Thickness: 9,000–10,000 m (30,000–33,000 ft)

Lithology
- Primary: Pyroclastic flow, rhyolite
- Other: Volcanic clastic rocks, pumice, lapilli, phenocrysts, plagioclase

Location
- Coordinates: 28.6°N 97.7°W
- Approximate paleocoordinates: 29.0°N 95.3°W
- Region: Mount Rainier National Park, Lewis, & Yakima counties, Washington
- Country: United States
- Extent: White Pass (Washington)

Type section
- Named for: Ohanapecosh Hotsprings
- Named by: Ingram
- Year defined: 1954
- Ohanapecosh Formation (the United States) Ohanapecosh Formation (Washington (state))

The volcaniclastic Ohanapecosh Formation is an early state of Cascade volcanism. It has been dated to the middle Oligocene [36 to 28 Ma]. The strata are as much as 3 kilometres (1.9 miles) thick, with exposures visible in more than 400 square kilometres (99,000 acres) of a total area exceeding 700 square kilometres (170,000 acres). It is found throughout Mount Rainier National Park and the surrounding mountains. It is the foundation on which the Mount Rainier volcano was built. The formation has been identified in the Snoqualmie area to the north, and as far south as the Columbia River Gorge, including Mount St. Helens and Mount Adams. It extends from the west at Mount Rainier and Lake Tapps, east to Little Naches River valley.

== Description ==
The contact of the Ohanapecosh Formation on the Puget Group is everywhere conformable and the Spiketon Formation and Renton Formation reflect a continuous process without a break in time. In contrast, the contact with the Naches Formation is an unconformity as seen in the Summit Creek Sandstone (~43 to 37 Ma) in the areas from White Pass east to the Naches River. In the Mount Rainier National Park area, the Ohanapecosh Formation is overlain by the Oligocene (25-27 Ma) Stevens Ridge Member, that is the lower part of the Fifes Peaks Formation. At Backbone Ridge, southeast of Mount Rainier, clasts of the Ohanapecosh Formation and tree trunks are found in the base of the lowest Stevens Ridge Member.

Various late Oligocene and Miocene eruptive centers are preserved in central Washington. The Mount Aix caldera (late Oligocene), Tieton volcano (Miocene) and Columbia River Basalt Group (Miocene) are late Oligocene and Miocene eruptive centers east of the Mount Rainier National Park. Fifes Peaks volcano is to the northeast of the national park, and the Tatoosh pluton is to the south. The Eocene-Miocene formations are covered by thick Quaternary volcaniclastic deposits and lavas.

== Lithology ==
The Ohanapecosh Formation is composed of volcanic clastic rocks and lava flows. The lava flows are interbedded with the coarse volcanic clastic rocks which are mostly mudflow deposits. Locally they can be thick, grading into finer clastic rocks. The ash flows and rhyolite flows are a small portion, less than 1 percent, of the formation. The Ohanapecosh Formation has been divided into three parts: (1) lava flow mudflow complexes, (2) adjacent accumulations of volcanic clastic rocks, and (3) ash flows and rhyolites.

=== Lava flow-mudflow complexes ===
Two major complexes of lava flows and associated mudflow deposits have been identified. The smaller one is in an irregular north-trending belt east and southeast of Mount Rainier. It is best exposed in the steep cirque walls of the Sarvent Glacier, i.e. Banshee Peak. The larger lava complex is in the Mount Wow-Satulick Mountain area, the southwestern part of the park. It can also be found in the valley of the North Puyallup River on the western park boundary. The Ohanapecosh formation of these areas is separated by extensive outcrops of the Tatoosh pluton and by deposits from the Mount Rainier volcano. The lava flows and interbedded mudflows are seen on Stevens Peak. These complexes are lens shaped. The maximum thickness of the Sarvent complex is about 3,800 feet (1,200 m), and the Mount Wow complex is at least 7,000 feet (2,100 m). Lava flows and coarse mudflow deposits form more than 70 percent of these units. Fresh exposures of Ohanapecosh lava are dark brownish gray, greenish gray, or maroon; most weathered surfaces are brown or maroon. Individual flows are from 10 to 100 feet (3.0 to 30.5 m) thick. All the Ohanapecosh lavas have been pervasively altered.

== See also ==
- List of geographic features in Lewis County, Washington
