= St. Elizabeth Hospital (Enumclaw, Washington) =

Hospital in Enumclaw, Washington, United States

St. Elizabeth Hospital is a hospital in Enumclaw, Washington. It was originally founded in 1949 as Community Memorial Hospital, with planning for the hospital started in 1944. The name Community Memorial Hospital was chosen to commemorate the dead of two world wars.

The hospital changed its name to Enumclaw Community Hospital in 1999, and became part of the Franciscan Health System in 2007 under the name Enumclaw Regional Hospital. The original hospital building was closed in 2011 and replaced by a new building, named St. Elizabeth Hospital. The organization running the hospital is still known as Enumclaw Regional Hospital Association.

It was acknowledged for its use of information technology in 2011, being listed as one of America's "most wired" small hospitals.
