= Suntop Lookout =

- U.S. National Register of Historic Places
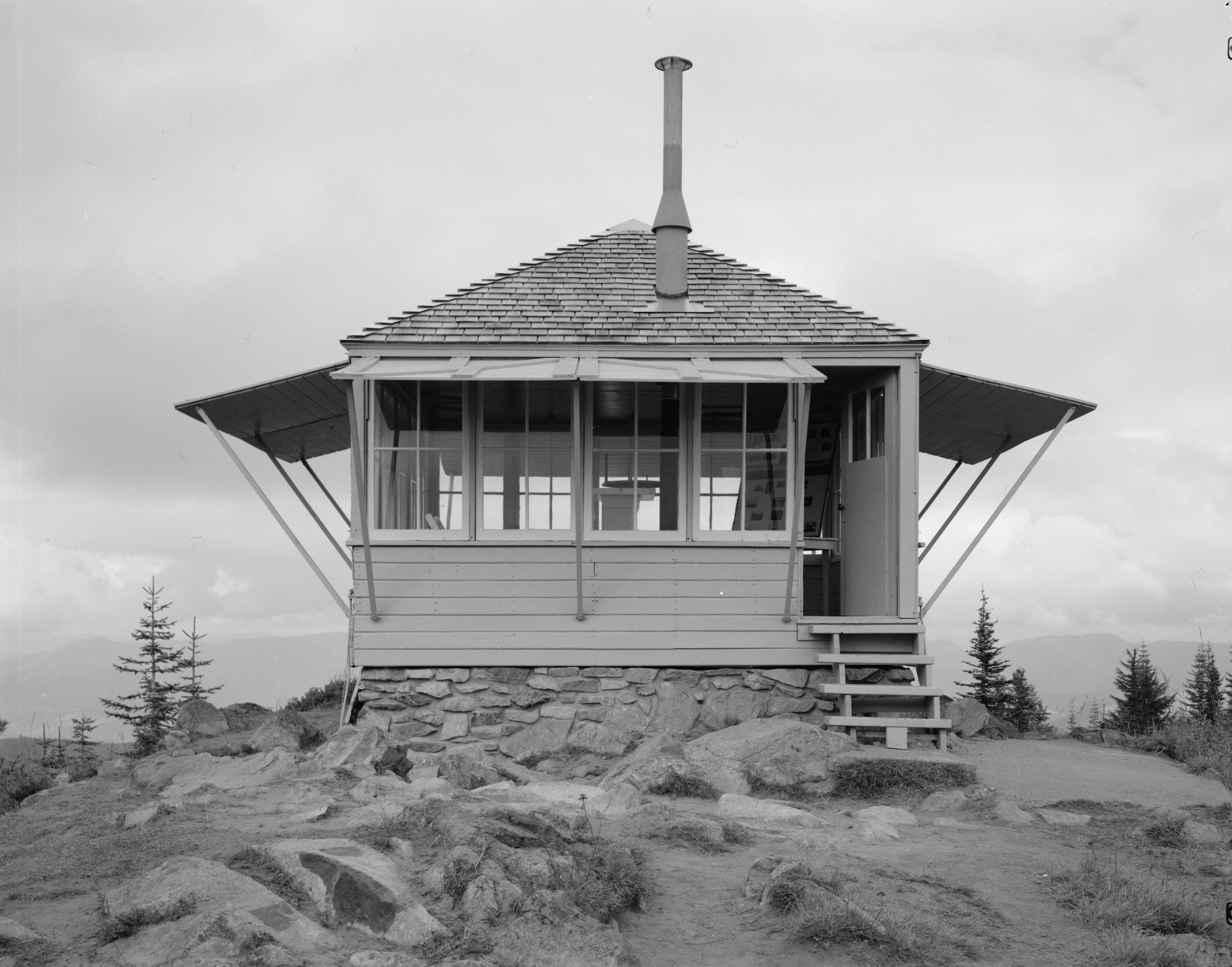

- Location within Washington (state)
- Location: White River Ranger District on Suntop Mountain, 15 mi. NE of Mt. Rainier, Enumclaw, Washington
- Coordinates: 47°2′29″N 121°35′37″W
- Area: less than one acre
- Built: 1933
- MPS: USDA Forest Service Fire Lookouts on Mt. Baker--Snoqualmie National Forest TR
- NRHP reference No.: 87001192
- Added to NRHP: July 14, 1987

Suntop Lookout (also Sun Top) is located on Suntop Mountain in Mount Baker-Snoqualmie National Forest in central Washington, USA. The fire lookout is at an elevation of about 5,270 feet (1,610 m) overlooking the valleys of the White River and Huckleberry Creek just to the north of Mount Rainier National Park. Built to standard U.S. Forest Service plans, the one-story ground-level lookout measures fourteen by fourteen feet. The frame structure is capped by a pyramidal roof, and features large windows on all four sides with pivoting shutters that act as sunshades.

The Suntop lookout was built in either 1932 or 1933 to standard plans for an "L-4 Lookout House." It is one of two intact lookouts from the period in the former Snoqualmie National Forest. The lookout was used during World War II in the U.S. Army Aircraft Warning System. It is open to the public in summer months.

The lookout was listed on the National Register of Historic Places on July 14, 1987 and the National Historic Lookout Register on September 15, 1994.

== In popular culture ==
A work within the SCP Foundation universe, SCP-3333, is primarily set at Suntop Lookout.
