= Enumclaw, Washington =

Enumclaw
- City
- City of Enumclaw
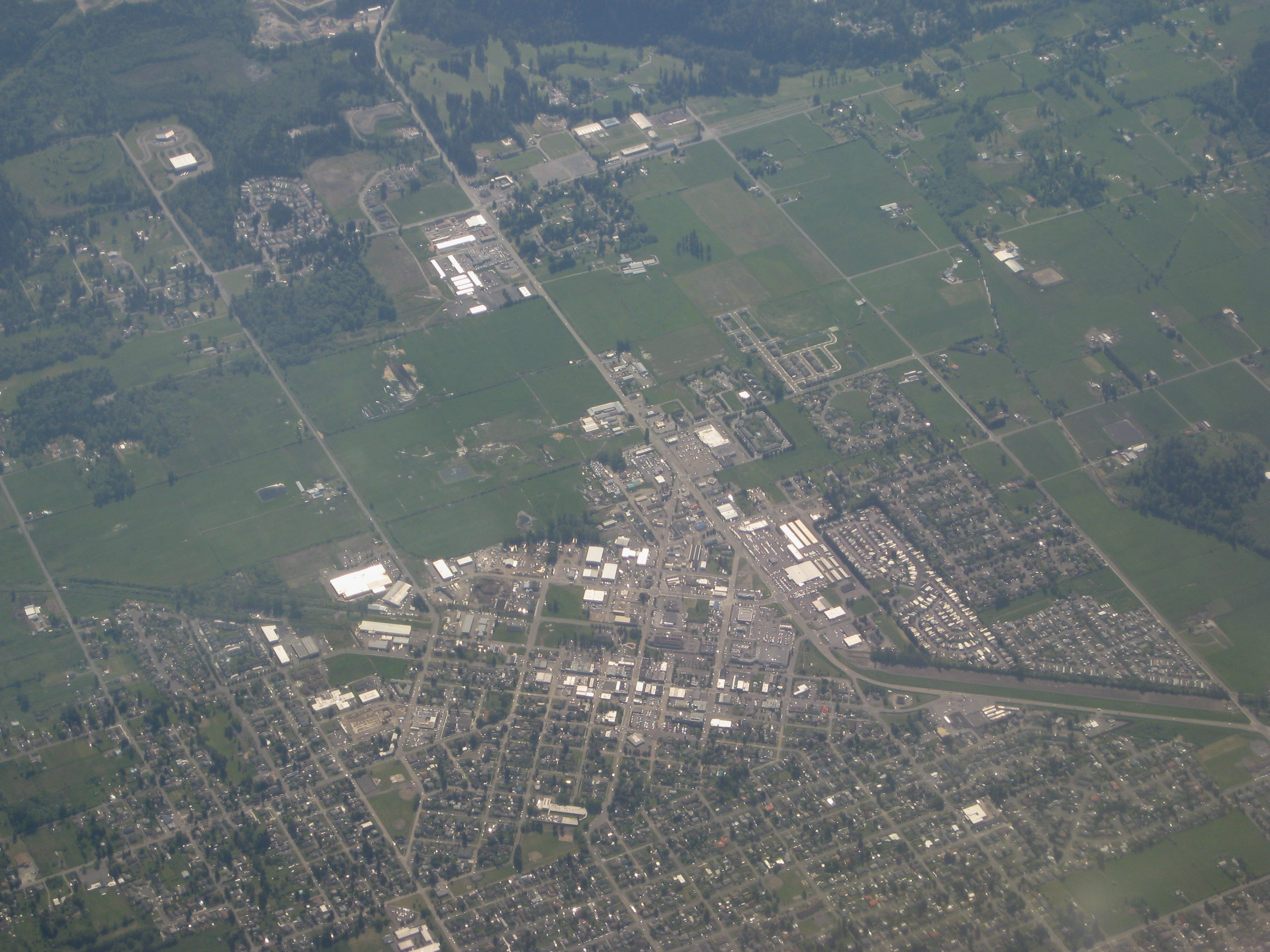
- Aerial view of Enumclaw

- Flag

- Location of Enumclaw within King County, Washington
- Coordinates: 47°12′04″N 121°59′49″W
- Country: United States
- State: Washington
- County: King
- Platted: October 31, 1885
- Incorporated: January 27, 1913

Government
  - Type: Mayor–council
  - Mayor: Anthony Wright

Area
  - Total: 5.17 sq mi (13.40 km^{2})
  - Land: 5.17 sq mi (13.40 km^{2})
  - Water: 0 sq mi (0.00 km^{2})
- Elevation: 745 ft (227 m)

Population (2020)
  - Total: 12,543
  - Estimate (2022): 12,721
  - Density: 2,356.9/sq mi (910.02/km^{2})
- Time zone: UTC-8 (Pacific (PST))
  - Summer (DST): UTC-7 (PDT)
- ZIP Code: 98022
- Area code(s): 360, 564
- FIPS code: 53-22045
- GNIS feature ID: 2410448
- Website: cityofenumclaw.net

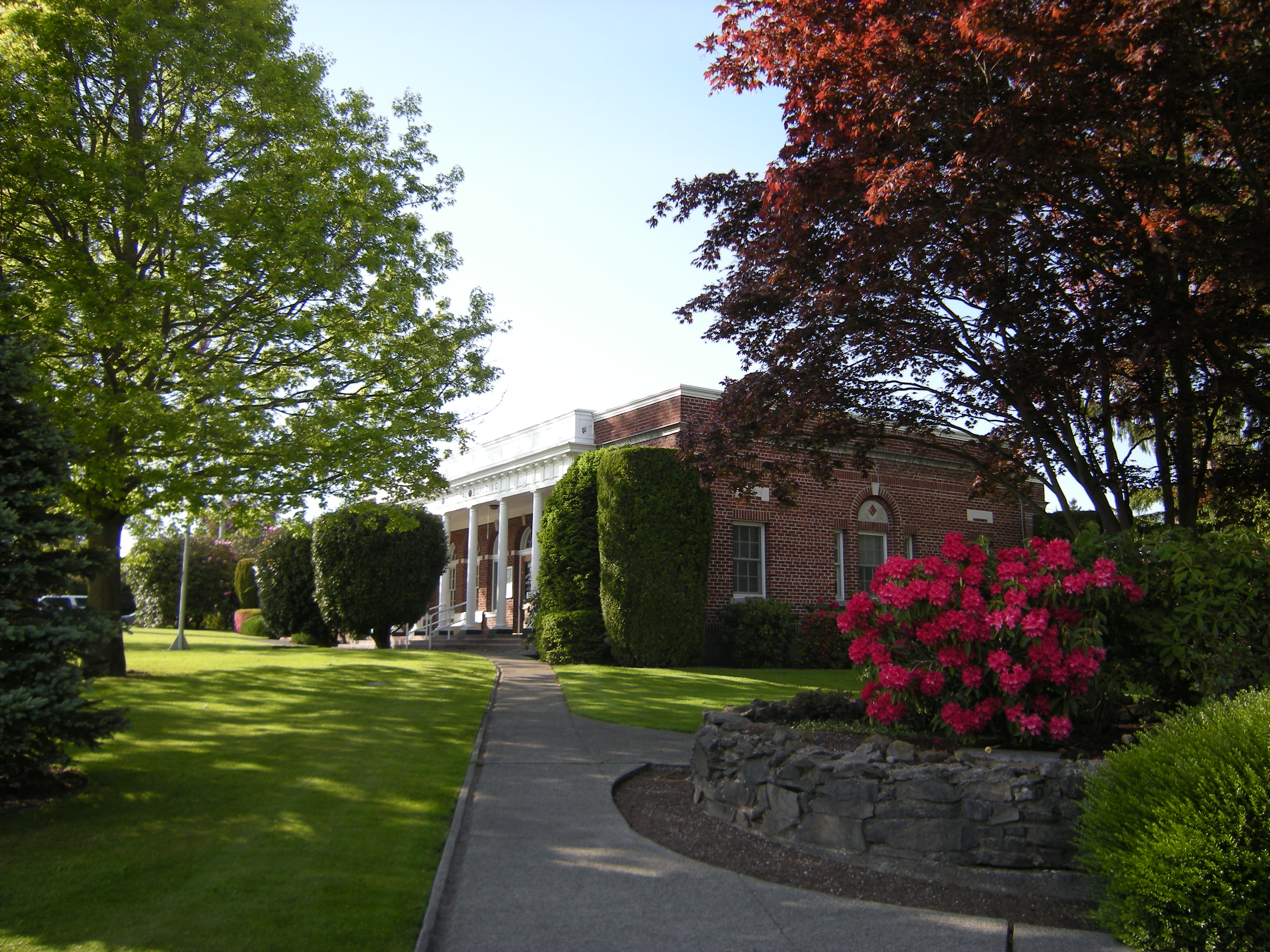
City Hall and Municipal building

Enumclaw (/ˈiːnəmklɔː/ EE-nəm-klaw) is a city in King County, Washington, United States. The population was 12,543 at the 2020 census.

The Enumclaw Plateau, on which the city resides, was formed by a volcanic mudflow (lahar) from Mount Rainier approximately 5,700 years ago.

== History ==
The name Enumclaw is derived from the Sahaptin word /inɨmɬá/, meaning "he who makes noise", from to /ínɨmn/, "to neigh, bray, sing", and /-ɬa/, "he who". Sometimes it is said that "Enumclaw" translates as "place of evil spirits", apparently referring to Enumclaw Mountain, located about 6 miles (9.7 km) to the north. According to legend the mountain's name was derived from an evil incident that occurred there, or to the occasional powerful windstorms from the east that affect the region. Native American mythology tells the story of two brothers – Enumclaw and Kapoonis – who were turned into thunder and lightning, respectively, by their father. The City of Enumclaw says the name means "thundering noise".

One of the first white settlers in south King County was Allen L. Porter. In 1853, he claimed a 320-acre (1.3 km^{2}) parcel on the White River, about three miles (5 km) west of the site of Enumclaw. He maintained a troubled relationship with the local Smalkamish tribe (some of the ancestors of the Muckleshoot tribe) for some time, and in 1855 his cabin was burned to the ground. Porter, who had been warned in advance by a friend in the tribe, hid in the woods until they had left. After warning the settlers at Fort Steilacoom, he left the area, moving to Roy. He would never return to Enumclaw.

Enumclaw itself was homesteaded in 1879 by Frank and Mary Stevenson. In 1885, the Northern Pacific Railroad routed their transcontinental mainline through the site, accepting their offer of cleared, level land on which to build a siding. Confident that the area would grow, the Stevensons filed a plat with King County that same year. They built a hotel and gave away lots for a saloon and a general store.

At first the people called the town 'Stevensonville' after the founders, who soon refused the honor. One resident suggested 'Enumclaw,' which was the name of the strange sawed-off promontory north of town. The name's uniqueness gained favor with the locals.

On January 11, 1895, Mount Baldy, a small peak above the town, "erupted" with tremendous fire and smoke, although no losses or damage were reported, and the conflagration was minimized by residents. Throughout the 1880s and 1890s the area was farmed for hops. When the hops crop failed due to pests and economic downturn, the residents turned to dairy farming, which has been a mainstay ever since. The first census listing Enumclaw in 1900 put the population at 483 people.

In the 1890s, the Northern Pacific Railroad rerouted their line through Palmer, a few miles to the east of town. In 1910, the Chicago, Milwaukee, St. Paul and Pacific Railroad routed a branch line through Enumclaw.

The city was incorporated on January 27, 1913. In 1929, a much-anticipated route to Eastern Washington was opened across the Naches Pass Highway. In the 1950s Enumclaw Insurance Group greatly expanded its business and the home office became a major employer in the town. The company is an insurer doing business in Washington, Oregon, Idaho and Utah.

In 2005 the Enumclaw horse sex case occurred on a farm five miles (8 km) northwest of Enumclaw towards Auburn, in unincorporated King County. A Boeing aerospace engineer named Kenneth Pinyan from Gig Harbor died after receiving anal sex from a horse at the farm. The case and the surrounding media attention led to Washington State banning bestiality.

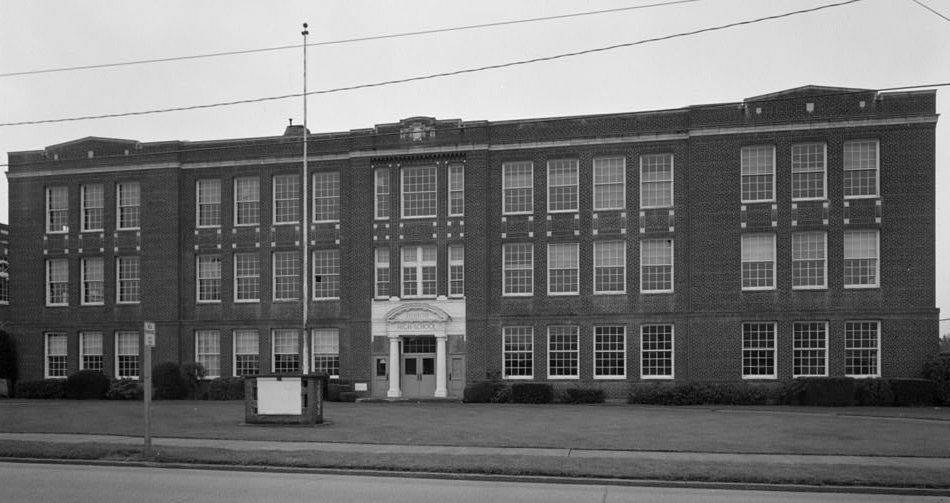
Old Enumclaw High School, built in 1921

== Geography ==
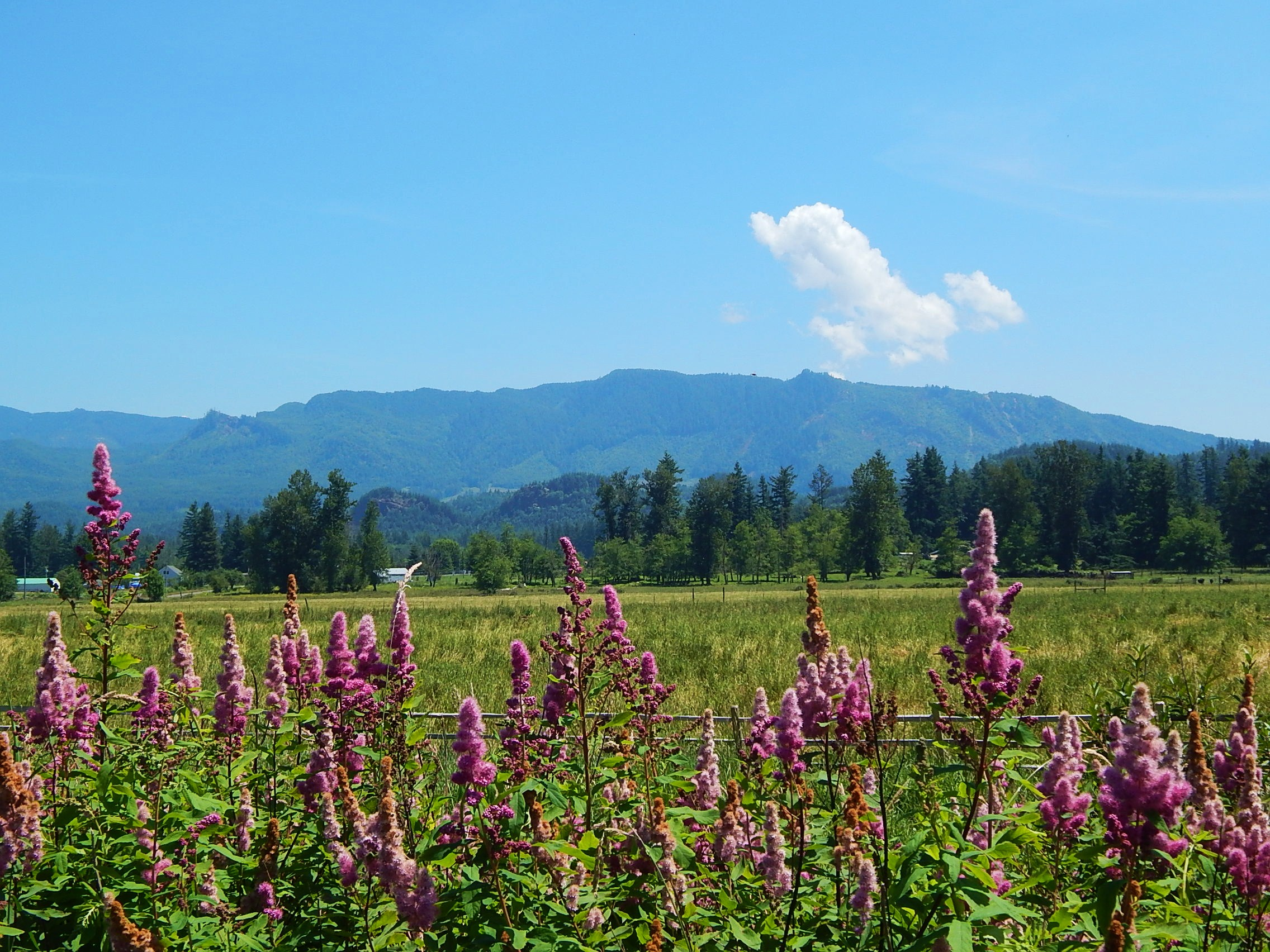
Farmland and Boise Ridge by Enumclaw

The city is located in the midst of flat, level farmlands and dairy farms in the east Puget Sound lowlands. The flat geography in the middle of mountainous territory is due to the ancient Osceola Mudflow from nearby Mount Rainier.

The city is unique in the fact that it is landlocked by farm preservation on three sides and by protected forest lands to the east. The city is nestled against the Cascade foothills.

According to the United States Census Bureau, the city has a total area of 4.27 square miles (11.06 km^{2}), of which, 4.26 square miles (11.03 km^{2}) is land and 0.01 square miles (0.03 km^{2}) is water.

While Enumclaw is entirely located in King County, the city owns some park property within the boundaries of Pierce County.

=== Climate ===
This region experiences very warm (but not hot) and dry summers, with no average monthly temperatures above 71.6 °F (22 °C). According to the Köppen climate classification system, Enumclaw has a warm-summer Mediterranean climate, abbreviated "Csb" on climate maps. Enumclaw typically runs about 5 degrees warmer than Seattle in the summer and 5 degrees colder than Seattle in the winter. The city of Enumclaw is generally above the fog while the area to the west of the city can see dense fog due to the proximity to the Green and White Rivers as well as Lake Tapps. Snow is moderate with a typical year seeing about 6 to 8 inches total.

Enumclaw recorded the highest wind speeds for a community in the state during the November 2024 Northeast Pacific bomb cyclone, reaching 74 miles per hour (119 km/h).

== Economy ==
Enumclaw is a bedroom community for workers who are employed in Seattle and Tacoma, among other areas. The city's employers include services and retailers as well as holdovers from its earlier reliance on agriculture, forestry, and other natural resources. Enumclaw's downtown has attracted boutique retailers and other local businesses as a result of the city government's urban renewal plan enacted in 2003. Enumclaw also has the most dairy farms in production within the King and Pierce County region.

=== Tourism ===
Enumclaw is the gateway to Mount Rainier National Park and the Crystal Mountain ski area. It is located along the Chinook Scenic Byway (SR 410), which provides seasonal access to the Yakima Valley and Eastern Washington. Enumclaw has four state parks in close proximity: Nolte, Flaming Geyser, Kanaskat Palmer, and Federation Forest. Enumclaw has become a basecamp for those wanting to ski at Crystal or hike Mt. Rainier during day and play at night. Enumclaw also hosts the annual King County Fair, the oldest county fair west of the Mississippi; the largest dog show in the United States; and seasonal festivals.

== Crime ==
According to the FBI's latest crime report (2023 data, issued in 2023), out of 281 cities in Washington State, Enumclaw is the 16th safest city for violent and property crimes. The Enumclaw City Council has continued to make policing a priority by increasing the department's budget, focusing on training and equipment. It is also the location of the Enumclaw horse sex case, which has become a joke on the internet for its bizarre and disturbing nature.

== Demographics ==
Historical population
Census	Pop.	Note	%±
1900	483		—
1910	1,129		133.7%
1920	1,378		22.1%
1930	2,084		51.2%
1940	2,627		26.1%
1950	2,789		6.2%
1960	3,269		17.2%
1970	4,703		43.9%
1980	5,427		15.4%
1990	7,227		33.2%
2000	11,116		53.8%
2010	10,669		−4.0%
2020	12,543		17.6%
2022 (est.)	12,721		1.4%
U.S. Decennial Census; 2020 Census

In the year 2000, the center of population of Washington State was located in an unincorporated part of King County, just northeast of town.

=== 2020 census ===
As of the 2020 census, Enumclaw had a population of 12,543 and a median age of 39.3 years; 23.2% of residents were under the age of 18 and 16.7% were 65 years of age or older. For every 100 females there were 92.5 males, and for every 100 females age 18 and over there were 88.4 males age 18 and over.

There were 5,077 households in Enumclaw, of which 30.1% had children under the age of 18 living in them. Of all households, 47.7% were married-couple households, 16.7% were households with a male householder and no spouse or partner present, and 27.4% were households with a female householder and no spouse or partner present. About 27.4% of all households were made up of individuals and 13.6% had someone living alone who was 65 years of age or older.

There were 5,365 housing units, of which 5.4% were vacant. The homeowner vacancy rate was 0.8% and the rental vacancy rate was 5.1%.

99.6% of residents lived in urban areas, while 0.4% lived in rural areas.

Racial composition as of the 2020 census
Race	Number	Percent
White	10,368	82.7%
Black or African American	109	0.9%
American Indian and Alaska Native	145	1.2%
Asian	138	1.1%
Native Hawaiian and Other Pacific Islander	46	0.4%
Some other race	544	4.3%
Two or more races	1,193	9.5%
Hispanic or Latino (of any race)	1,176	9.4%

=== 2010 census ===
As of the 2010 census, there were 10,669 people, 4,420 households, and 2,793 families residing in the city. The population density was 2,504.5 inhabitants per square mile (967.0/km^{2}). There were 4,683 housing units at an average density of 1,099.3 per square mile (424.4/km^{2}). The racial makeup of the city was 91.8% White, 0.5% African American, 1.0% Native American, 0.9% Asian, 0.1% Pacific Islander, 2.9% from other races, and 2.7% from two or more races. Hispanic or Latino of any race were 6.6% of the population.

There were 4,420 households, of which 32.9% had children under the age of 18 living with them, 45.9% were married couples living together, 12.4% had a female householder with no husband present, 4.8% had a male householder with no wife present, and 36.8% were non-families. 30.8% of all households were made up of individuals, and 14% had someone living alone who was 65 years of age or older. The average household size was 2.39 and the average family size was 3.00.

The median age in the city was 38.9 years. 24.5% of residents were under the age of 18; 8.8% were between the ages of 18 and 24; 24.8% were from 25 to 44; 26.9% were from 45 to 64; and 14.9% were 65 years of age or older. The gender makeup of the city was 47.8% male and 52.2% female.

== Government ==
Presidential Elections Results
Year	Republican	Democratic	Third Parties
2020	52.76% 3,884	43.93% 3,234	3.30% 243

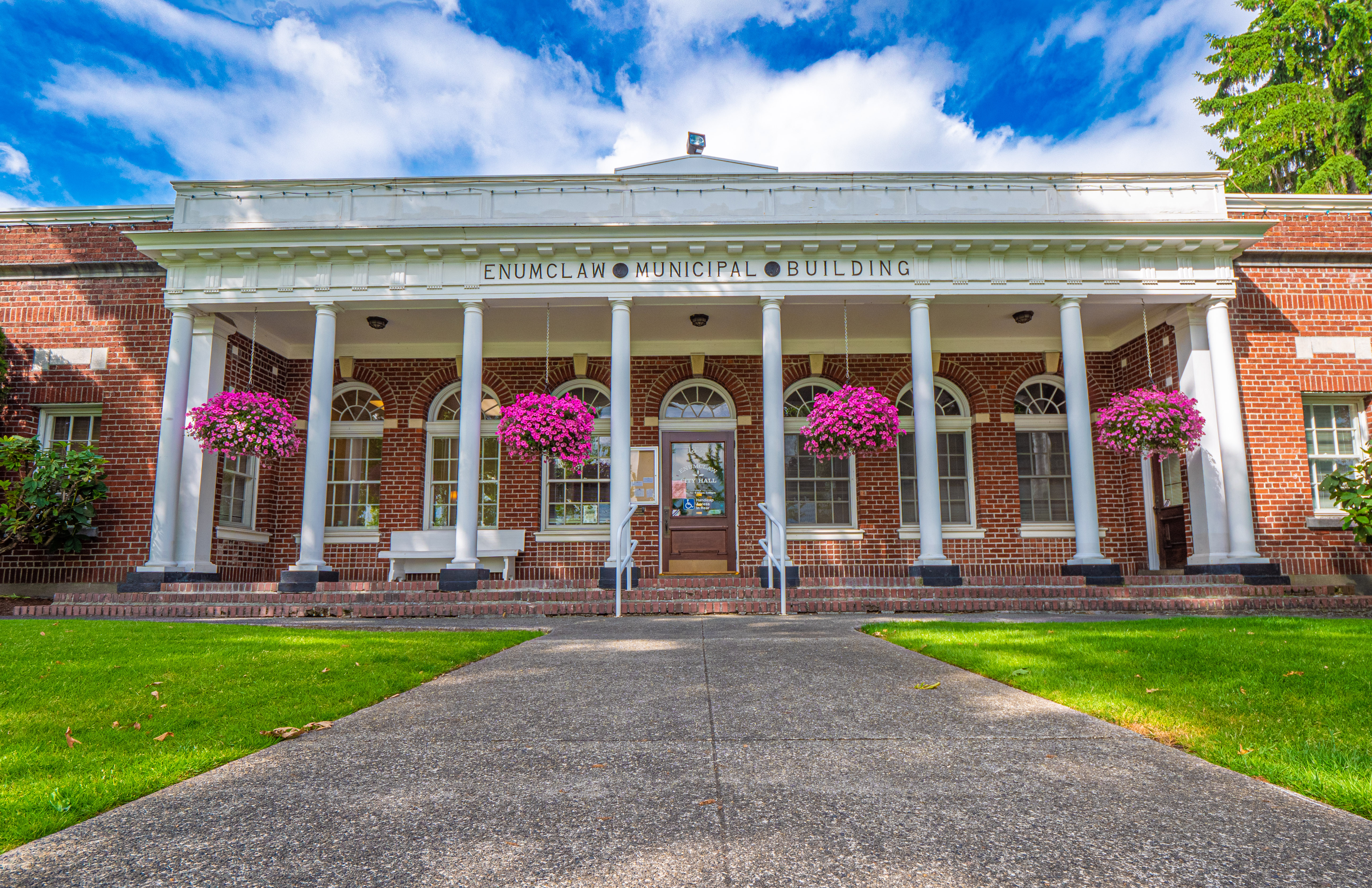
Enumclaw City Hall

Enumclaw has a mayor–council government that is governed by a seven-member city council. The city councilmembers are elected at-large to four-year terms with no limits. The mayor is also elected to a four-year term with no limits. Anthony Wright was elected mayor in 2025 and took office on January 1, 2026.

City council meetings are held on the second and fourth Mondays of each month at 7:00 p.m. in Council Chambers at City Hall. The agenda and Council packets are available online and at City Hall prior to the meeting.

Enumclaw has breed-specific legislation limiting pit bull dogs within the city limits.

The City of Enumclaw operates its own solid waste utility (garbage), water, stormwater and sewer departments. The city is unique as it is just one of two cities in Washington State that owns its own natural gas utility.

The United States Postal Service operates the Enumclaw Post Office and a regional distribution center. Enumclaw is also home to a detachment for the Washington State Patrol (WSP), the U.S. Forest Service, the Department of Natural Resources and the Washington State Department of Transportation (WSDOT).

== Media ==
The town is home to the Courier-Herald newspaper. Enumclaw is also home to KGRG (1330 AM), a 500 watt AM college radio station licensed to the Green River Foundation and operated by Green River Community College in Auburn.

== Health care ==
Enumclaw's Virginia Mason St. Elizabeth Hospital, is part of the Catholic Health Initiatives (a seven-hospital organization based in Tacoma). The hospital was included on the 2011 list of the 25 "Most Wired" small and rural hospitals in the nation for its use of information technology to support quality patient care and achieve operational efficiencies. It replaced the former Enumclaw Community Hospital in 2011.

== Parks and recreation ==
The Enumclaw Expo Center annually hosts the King County Fair and the Pacific Northwest Scottish Highland Games, among a number of other exhibitions and festivals. The Olympic Kennel Club has the 5th largest dog show in the nation each year in August. The 72-acre (29 ha) facility has many areas that are available to rent for weddings, trade shows, conventions and other special events.

== Education ==
The Enumclaw School District operates public schools for students living in the city of Enumclaw and nearby unincorporated areas.

Elementary schools in Enumclaw and serving portions of Enumclaw include Black Diamond, Byron Kibler, Southwood, Sunrise, and Westwood. Some portions of Enumclaw are zoned to Enumclaw Middle School in Enumclaw, while some portions are zoned to Thunder Mountain Middle School in unincorporated King County. All residents of Enumclaw are zoned to Enumclaw High School. Green River Community College operates a campus in Enumclaw. Mike Nelson, former Superintendent of Enumclaw School District, won the 2018 State Superintendent of the Year Award.

== Notable people ==
- T.R. Bryden, baseball player. Played for the California Angels major league pitcher.
- Chase Hooper, UFC fighter
- Jeff Hougland, UFC fighter, Founder of Combat Sport and Fitness
- Kasey Kahne, former driver in the NASCAR Cup Series and current sprint car driver
- Richard Kovacevich, chairman of the board of directors of Wells Fargo & Company
- Swen Nater, retired Dutch professional basketball player
- Brian Scalabrine, retired basketball player, formerly of the NBA's Boston Celtics and Chicago Bulls
- Tony Tost, poet and screenwriter

== See also ==
- Logging Legacy Memorial
- Enumclaw (band)
