= Fifes Peaks =

Mountains in Washington state

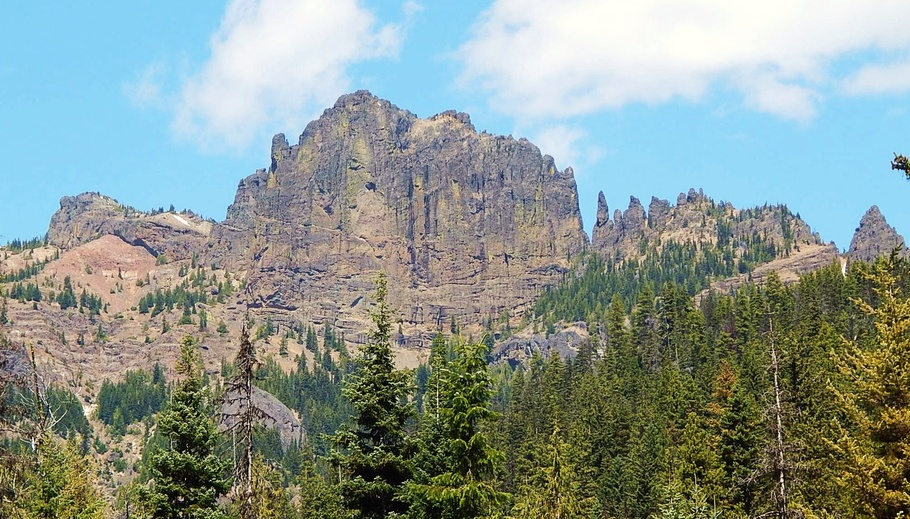
- Fifes Peaks - Central Peak seen from Mather Memorial Highway

Highest point
- Elevation: 6,880 ft (2,097 m)
- Prominence: 440 ft (134 m)
- Coordinates: 46°58′28″N 121°19′44″W

Geography
- Location within Washington (state) Location within the United States
- Country: United States
- State: Washington
- County: Yakima
- Protected area: Norse Peak Wilderness
- Parent range: Cascades
- Topo map: USGS Goose Prairie

Geology
- Rock type: Andesite lava

Climbing
- Easiest route: Scrambling class 2

Fifes Peaks is a compact group of summits and spires from an eroded volcanic cone located in Yakima County in Washington state. Fifes Peaks is situated in the Cascade Range on the east side of the crest, within the Norse Peak Wilderness. The Fifes Peaks are remnants of a now extinct caldera which exploded 25 million years ago with volcanic activity extending from 20 to 30 million years ago.

== Principal summits ==
- Fifes Peaks West Peak - 6,880+ ft
- Fifes Peaks Central Peak- 6,793 ft
- Fifes Peaks East Peak - 6,375 ft
- Mainmast - 6,400+ ft
- Cannonhole Pinnacle - 6,600+ ft
- Teddy Bear Pinnacle - 6260 ft

== History ==
Fifes Peaks were named for Thomas X. Fife (1853–1922), a placer miner. Thomas, his brothers, and their father, John, mined in the area near Chinook Pass. Tom homesteaded at Goose Prairie, near Bumping Lake. Camp Fife, the Boy Scout Camp at Goose Prairie, also honors Tom Fife because he willed the land to the Boy Scouts.

== Climate ==
Fifes Peaks are located east of the Cascade crest. Most weather fronts originating in the Pacific Ocean travel northeast toward the Cascade Mountains. As fronts approach, they are forced upward by the peaks of the Cascade Range (orographic lift), causing them to drop their moisture in the form of rain or snow onto the Cascades. As a result, the east side of the Cascades experiences less precipitation than the west side of the crest. During winter months, weather is usually cloudy, but due to high pressure systems over the Pacific Ocean that intensify during summer months, there is often little or no cloud cover during the summer. Precipitation runoff from Fifes Peaks drains into tributaries of the American River and Naches River.

== See also ==
- Fifes Peaks Formation

== Gallery ==
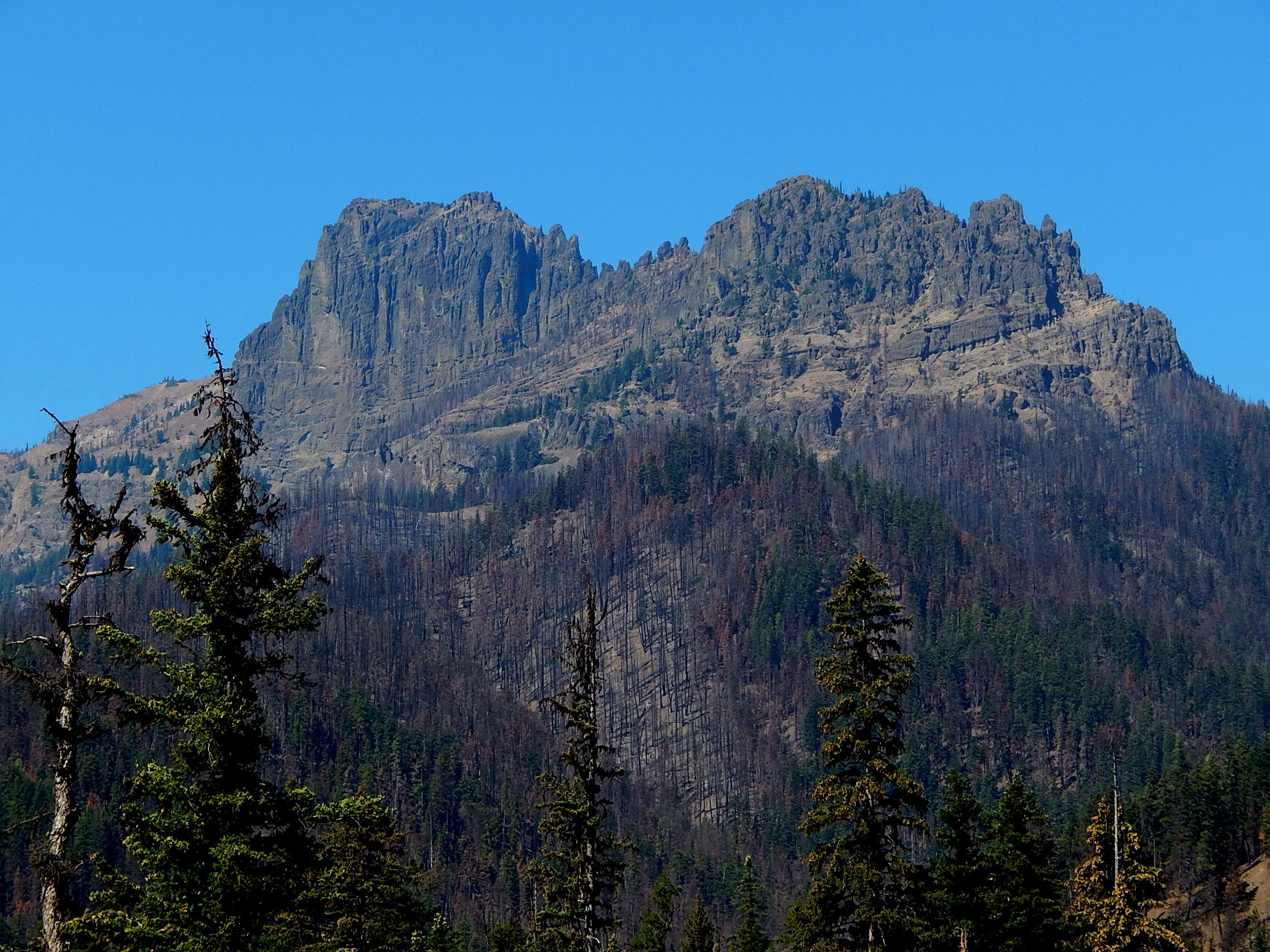
Central and East

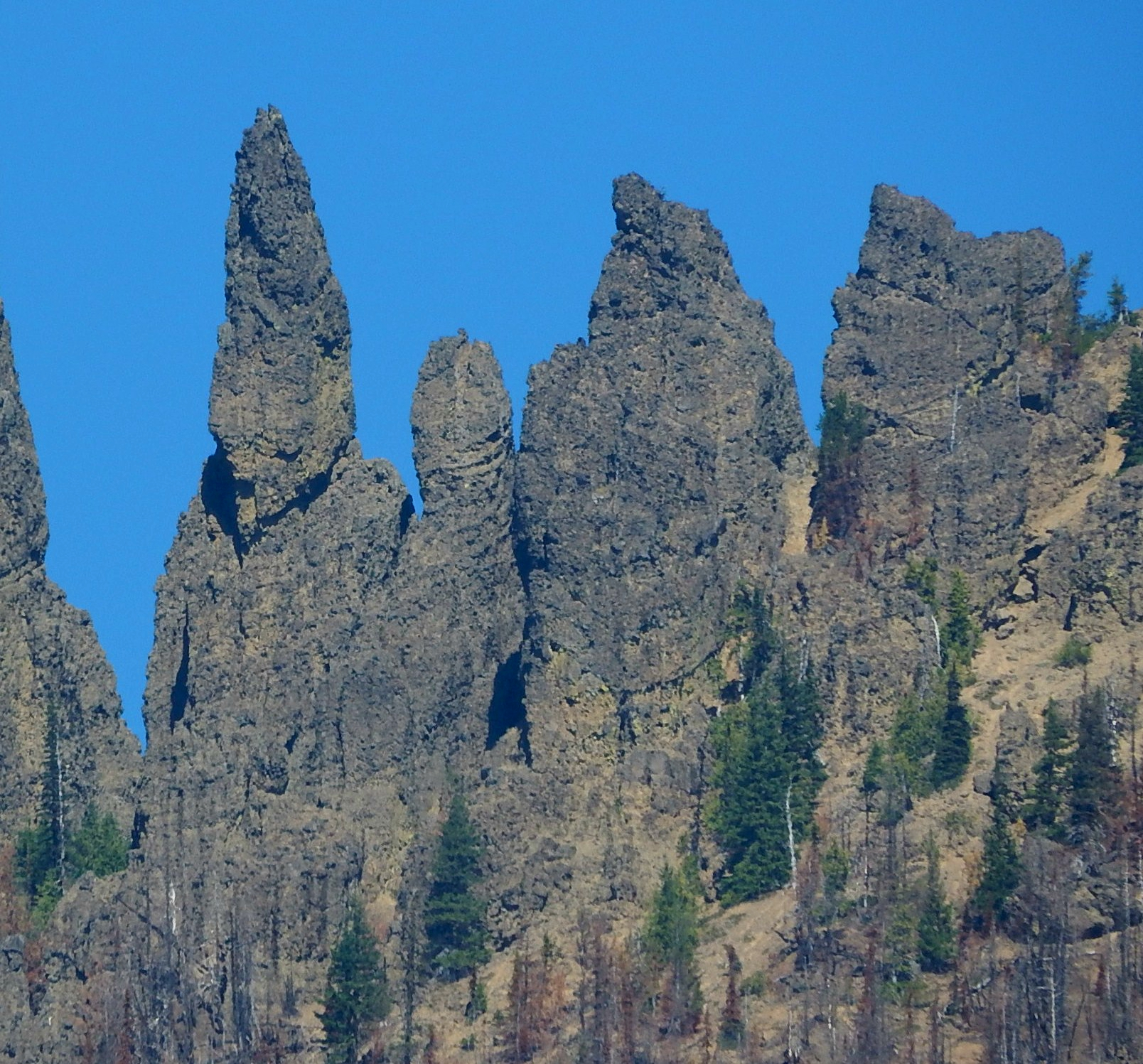
Mainmast

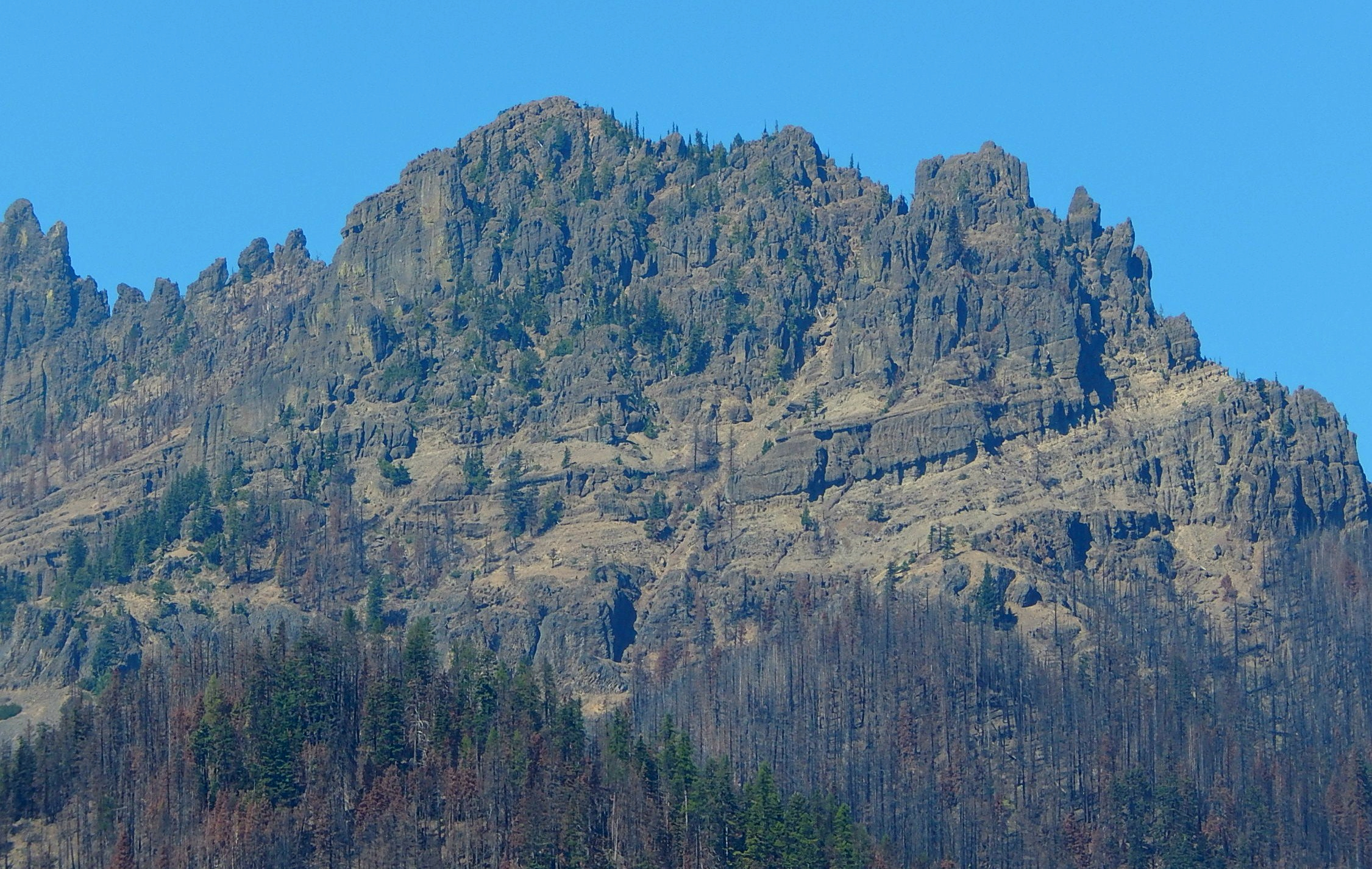
East Peak

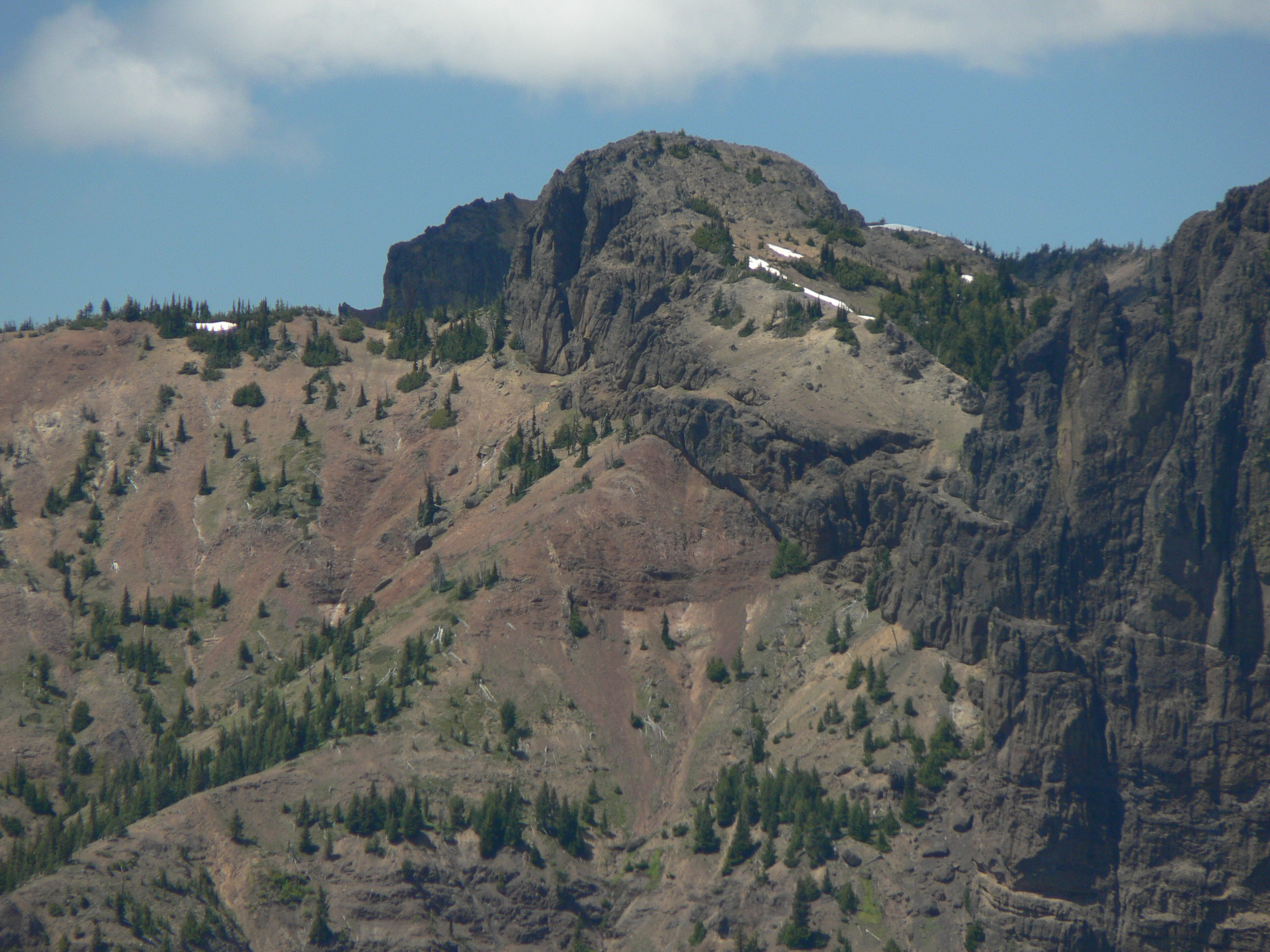
West Peak

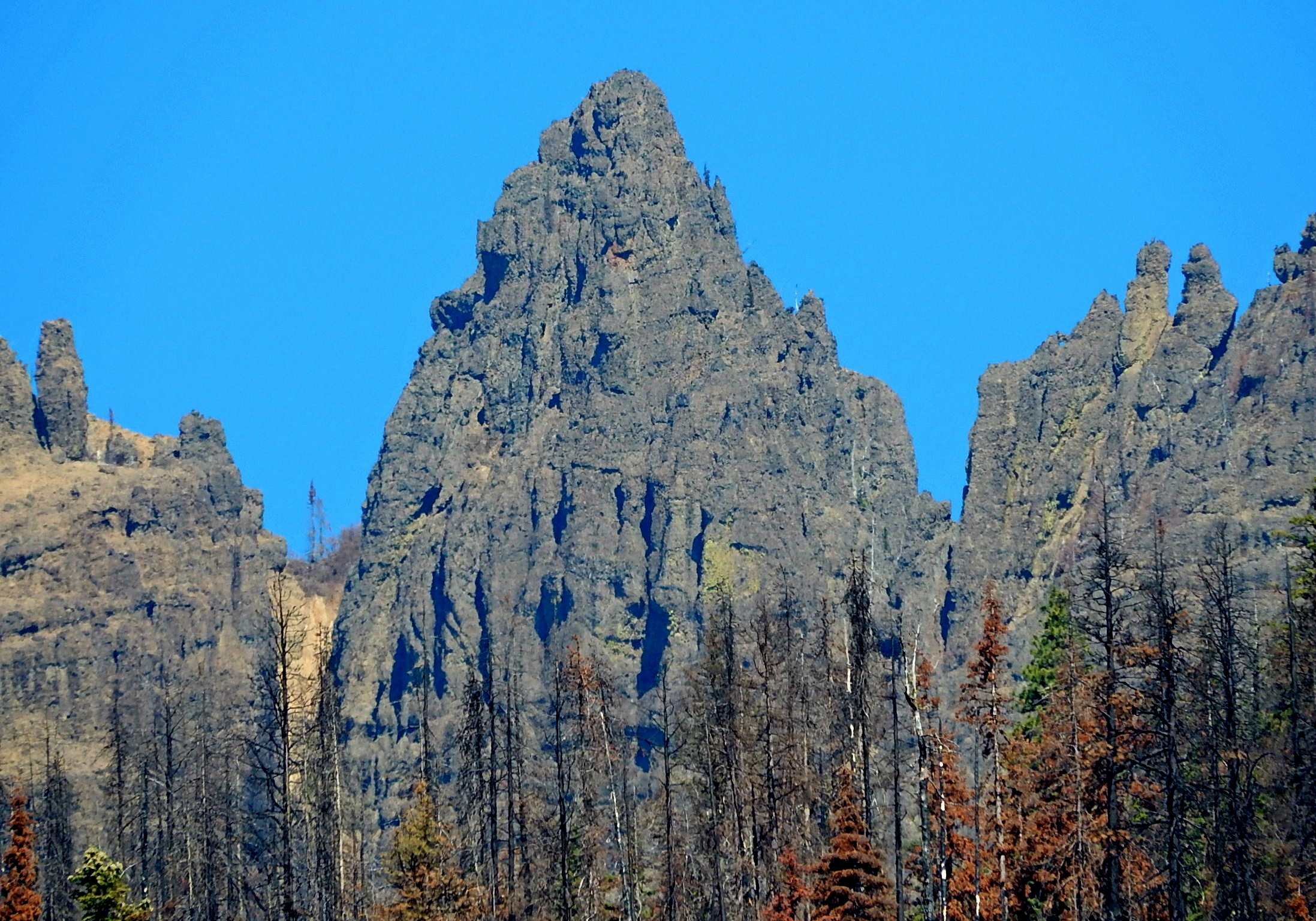
pinnacle
