= Interstate 90 in Washington =

Interstate Highway in Washington

Interstate 90
- American Veterans Memorial Highway
- Map of Washington with I-90 highlighted in red

Route information
- Maintained by WSDOT
- Length: 297.51 mi (478.80 km)
- Existed: 1957–present
- History: Completed in 1993
- Tourist routes: Mountains to Sound Greenway
- NHS: Entire route

Major junctions
- West end: SR 519 in Seattle
- I-5 in Seattle; I-405 in Bellevue; I-82 / US 97 near Ellensburg; US 395 from Ritzville to Spokane; US 2 in Spokane; US 195 in Spokane
- East end: I-90 at Idaho state line near Liberty Lake

Location
- Country: United States
- State: Washington
- Counties: King, Kittitas, Grant, Adams, Lincoln, Spokane

Highway system
- Interstate Highway System; Main; Auxiliary; Suffixed; Business; Future; State highways in Washington; Interstate; US; State; Scenic; Pre-1964; 1964 renumbering; Former
| ← I-82 | → SR 92 |

Interstate 90 (I-90), designated as the American Veterans Memorial Highway, is a transcontinental Interstate Highway that runs from Seattle, Washington, to Boston, Massachusetts. It crosses Washington state from west to east, traveling 298 miles (480 km) from Seattle across the Cascade Mountains and into Eastern Washington, reaching the Idaho state line east of Spokane. I-90 intersects several of the state's other major highways, including I-5 in Seattle, I-82 and U.S. Route 97 (US 97) near Ellensburg, and US 395 and US 2 in Spokane.

I-90 is the only Interstate to cross the state from west to east, and the only one to connect the state's two largest cities, Seattle and Spokane. It incorporates two of the longest floating bridges in the world, the Lacey V. Murrow Memorial Bridge and the Homer M. Hadley Memorial Bridge, which cross Lake Washington from Seattle to Mercer Island. I-90 crosses the Cascades at Snoqualmie Pass, one of the busiest mountain pass highways in the United States, and uses a series of viaducts and structures to navigate the terrain. The freeway travels across suburban bedroom communities in the Seattle metropolitan area, the forests of the Cascade Range, and the high plains of the Columbia Plateau.

The crossing at Snoqualmie Pass was established as a wagon road in 1867 and incorporated into a cross-state auto trail, known as the Sunset Highway, in the early 1910s. The Sunset Highway was incorporated into the national highway system in 1926 as part of US 10, which I-90 replaced when it was designated in 1957. The first segments of the freeway, located in Spokane and Spokane Valley, opened at around the same time and the state government completed upgrades of US 10 to Interstate standards for most of the route by the late 1970s.

The section of I-90 between Seattle and I-405 in Bellevue was delayed for decades because of environmental concerns and lawsuits by local groups over the freeway's potential impact on nearby neighborhoods. A compromise agreement was reached by the federal, state, and local governments in 1976 to build a second floating bridge across Lake Washington and include extensive parks above tunneled sections of I-90, which were completed in the late 1980s and early 1990s. The new floating bridge opened in 1989 and carried bi-directional traffic while the original floating bridge was renovated. The old bridge's center pontoons sank during a November 1990 windstorm due to a contractor error and were rebuilt over the following three years, reopening to traffic on September 12, 1993, marking the completion of the transcontinental highway.

== Route description ==
Interstate 90 is the longest freeway in Washington state, at nearly 298 miles (480 km) in length, and is the only Interstate to traverse the state from west to east across the Cascade Mountains. It is listed as part of the National Highway System, classifying important to the national economy, defense, and mobility, and the state's Highway of Statewide Significance program, recognizing its connection to major communities. The Washington State Legislature designated the highway as the "American Veterans Memorial Highway" in 1991 to honor U.S. soldiers. A 100-mile (160 km) section of I-90 between Seattle and Thorp named the Mountains to Sound Greenway was designated in 1998 as a National Scenic Byway, in recognition of its scenic views.

I-90 is maintained by the Washington State Department of Transportation (WSDOT), who conduct an annual survey of traffic volume that is expressed in terms of annual average daily traffic (AADT), a measure of traffic volume for any average day of the year. A section of I-90 in Bellevue's Eastgate neighborhood carries a daily average of 150,000 vehicles, making it the highway's busiest. The highway's least busy section, near SR 21 west of Ritzville, carried 11,000 vehicles in 2016. The freeway has a maximum speed limit of 60 miles per hour (97 km/h) in urban areas, 65 mph (105 km/h) in mountainous areas, and 70 mph (110 km/h) in rural areas. Several proposals to raise the speed limit of the rural section between Vantage and Spokane to 75 mph (121 km/h) have been submitted and denied by the state government due to safety concerns.

=== Seattle, Mercer Island, and Bellevue ===
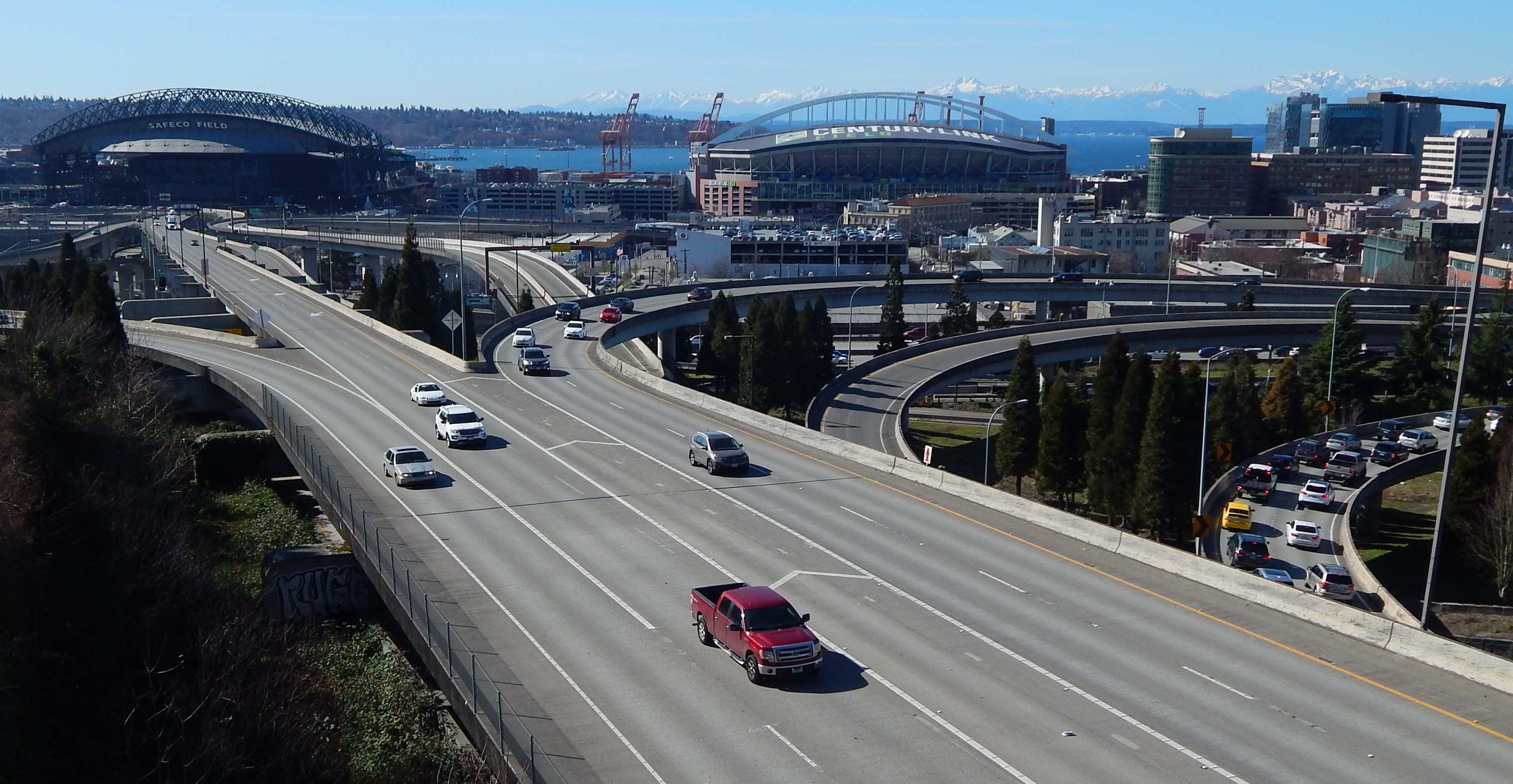
Looking west at the intersection of I-90 and I-5 in downtown Seattle

I-90 begins its eastward journey at the intersection of Edgar Martinez Drive South (part of SR 519) and 4th Avenue South in the SoDo neighborhood south of Downtown Seattle. The interchange is adjacent to T-Mobile Park, home to the Seattle Mariners baseball team, and includes a pair of ramps to SR 519 and an additional offramp to 4th Avenue South north of Royal Brougham Way and near Lumen Field. The ramps converge over the Stadium light rail station adjacent to King County Metro's bus bases and were formerly joined by bus-only express lane ramps from the Downtown Seattle Transit Tunnel and 5th Avenue in the International District. I-90 travels east through a major interchange with I-5 at the northwest corner of Beacon Hill and passes under the Jose Rizal Bridge.

The freeway wraps around the north end of Beacon Hill and intersects Rainier Avenue at the site of the Judkins Park light rail station, joined by a multi-use bicycle and pedestrian trail that forms part of the Mountains to Sound Greenway. I-90 travels east into the Mount Baker Tunnel, a set of tunnels which run under Sam Smith Park and the Mount Baker Ridge neighborhood to Lake Washington; they are also listed on the National Register of Historic Places. At the east end of the tunnels, traffic continues onto a pair of floating bridges; the eastbound lanes are carried by the Lacey V. Murrow Memorial Bridge, while the westbound lanes, multi-use trail, and light rail tracks are carried by the wider Homer M. Hadley Memorial Bridge. The two floating bridges connect Seattle to the Eastside suburbs and are among the longest in the world, at 5,811 feet (1,771 m) and 6,603 feet (2,013 m) in length, respectively.

From the east end of the bridge, I-90 continues onto Mercer Island and travels under the Mercer Island Lid, a landscaped park built atop a curved section of the freeway between West Mercer Way and 76th Avenue Northeast. I-90 emerges in downtown Mercer Island, adjacent to its light rail station in the freeway median and park and ride. The freeway passes under a smaller lid at Luther Burbank Park and leaves the island on the East Channel Bridge, which crosses a smaller arm of Lake Washington into Bellevue. I-90 travels to the south of Enatai and Beaux Arts Village and intersects Bellevue Way, where light rail tracks turn north away from the freeway, before crossing the Mercer Slough and its wetlands. The freeway gains a set of collector–distributor lanes and widens to 16 lanes as it passes under a disused railroad bridge that is slated to be part of the Eastside Rail Corridor trail. The freeway then meets I-405 in a large stack interchange northwest of the Factoria Mall and near the headquarters of T-Mobile US. South of the Bellevue College campus in Eastgate, I-90 intersects 142nd Place Southeast using direct ramps from its high-occupancy vehicle (HOV) lanes. Near the former Bellevue Airfield, I-90 turns southeast to run downhill from Cougar Mountain and along the shore of Lake Sammamish towards Issaquah.

=== East King, Snoqualmie Pass, and Kittitas ===
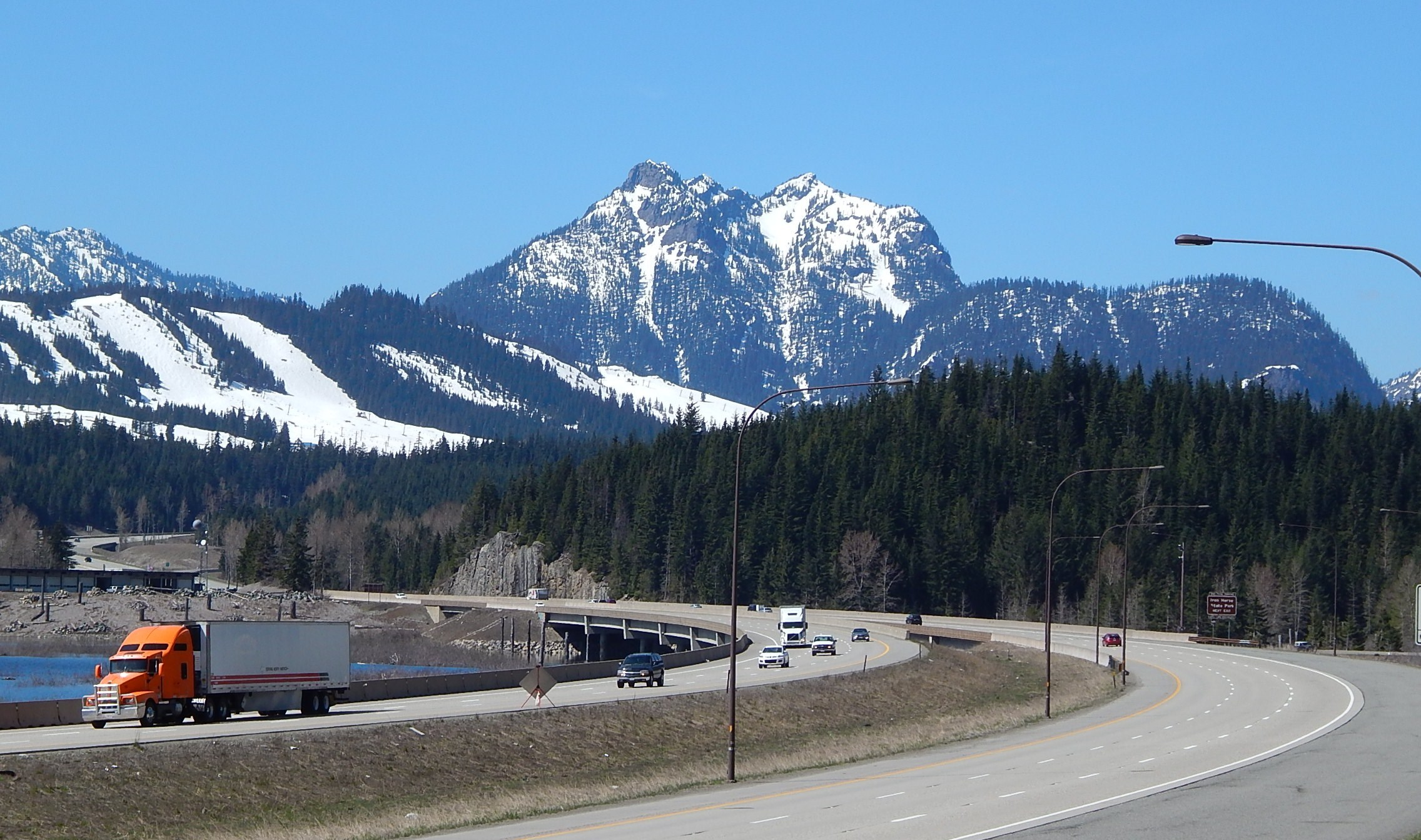
A section of I-90 near Snoqualmie Pass

At the south end of Lake Sammamish and northwest of downtown Issaquah, I-90 passes through Lake Sammamish State Park and intersects SR 900. The freeway travels along the north edge of downtown Issaquah, zig-zagging to the south and north to avoid the ridge of Issaquah Highlands and western Tiger Mountain. I-90 leaves Issaquah and enters the heavily forested Issaquah Alps, skirting the north edge of the Tiger Mountain State Forest as it passes Preston. Northeast of Tiger Mountain, the freeway intersects SR 18 and an arterial street connecting to Snoqualmie and Snoqualmie Ridge. I-90 continues southeast past the Snoqualmie Casino to North Bend, where it intersects SR 202. The freeway travels around the southern edge of North Bend and neighboring Tanner in the foothills of Rattlesnake Ridge. I-90 continues southeasterly along the South Fork of the Snoqualmie River into the Snoqualmie National Forest, which also hosts several state parks and campgrounds.

I-90 continues in a southern arc around several mountains in the Alpine Lakes Wilderness while following the South Fork of the Snoqualmie River. At the east end of the arc near the Asahel Curtis Picnic Area, the freeway's westbound and eastbound lanes are split by a wide median that includes the Denny Creek Campground. I-90 continues northeast on two high viaducts and ascends to Snoqualmie Pass, the lowest of the state's three major Cascades passes at an elevation of 3,022 feet (921 m). The pass handles 28,000 vehicles (including 6,500 trucks) on an average weekday, making it one of the busiest mountain highways in the United States. I-90 intersects the Pacific Crest Trail and SR 906 at the pass, providing access to the adjacent Snoqualmie ski resort. The freeway travels south into Kittitas County and intersects SR 906 Spur at Hyak. I-90 continues south through the Wenatchee National Forest along the eastern shore of Keechelus Lake, under steep cliffs that were cut using controlled blasting. At the south end of the lake, the freeway passes under a 66-foot-long (20 m) arched wildlife bridge, which is the first to be built in Washington state.

While Snoqualmie Pass does not have an annual closure like other passes in the Cascades, it does suffer from vehicle restrictions and occasional days-long shutdowns during the wintertime for avalanche control and clearing collisions. I-90 has several chain-on and chain-off areas on the highway shoulders between North Bend and Cle Elum, including variable-message signage to inform drivers of road conditions. WSDOT estimates that it costs $2–3 million annually to keep Snoqualmie Pass open in the wintertime, which sees an average snowfall of 233 inches (590 cm) and about 120 hours of closures per year.

I-90 continues southeast along the Yakima River to Easton, where it leaves the national forest and is joined by the Palouse to Cascades State Park Trail, part of Iron Horse State Park. The freeway passes several ranches and resort communities, including Suncadia, before reaching Cle Elum. I-90 runs to the south of downtown along the Yakima River and intersects SR 10 east of the city before crossing the river. SR 10 follows the former route of US 10 on the north side of the Yakima River, connecting to SR 903 and SR 970. The two highways continue southeast along the Yakima River and enter the Kittitas Valley near Thorp. I-90 begins a concurrency with US 97 west of Ellensburg, which continues as the freeway travels around the outskirts of the city to an interchange with I-82, which travels south with US 97 along the Yakima River towards Yakima.

=== Columbia Plateau and Spokane area ===
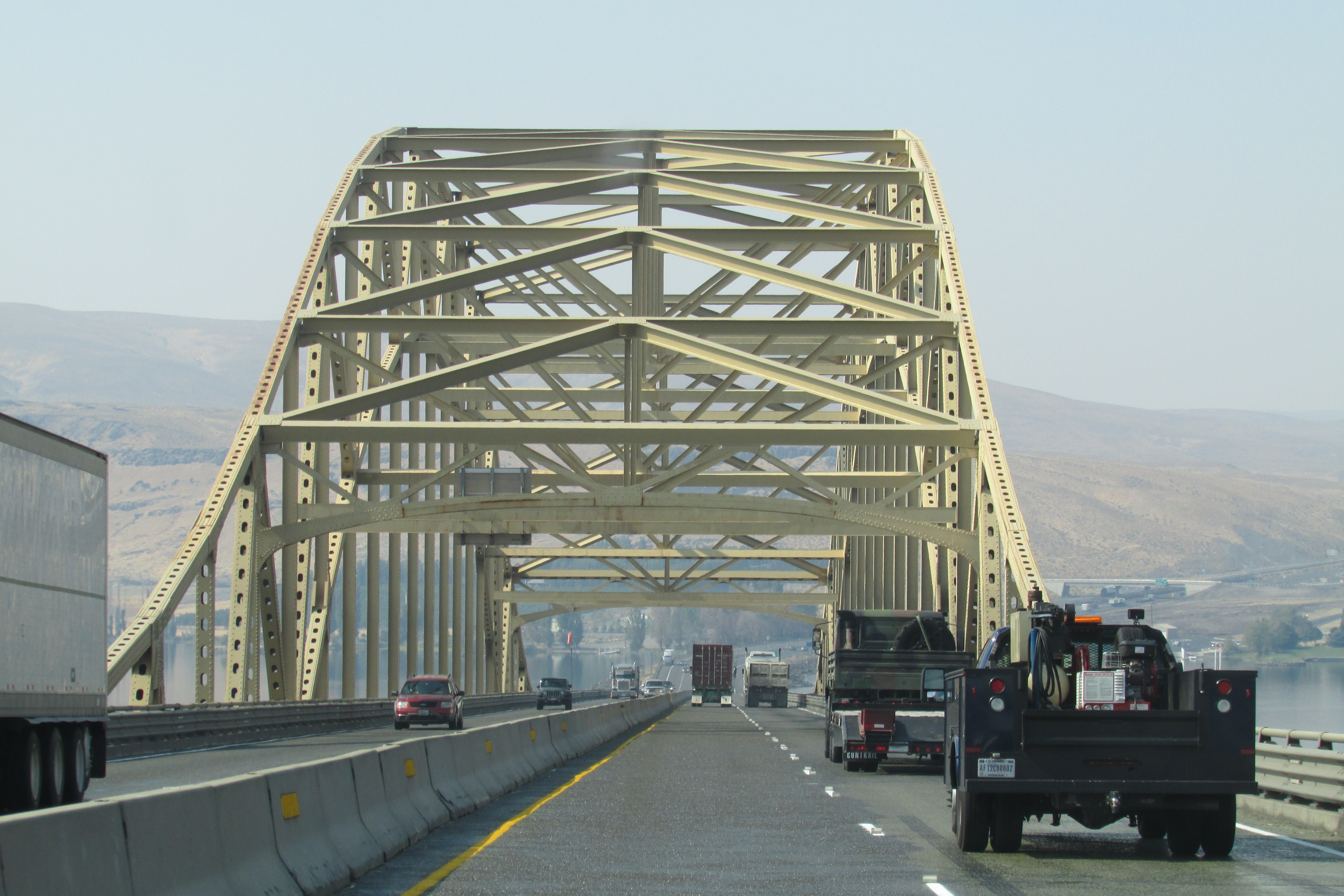
I-90 crossing the Columbia River on the Vantage Bridge, as seen from the westbound lanes

I-90 crosses into the Columbia Plateau at the east end of the Kittitas Valley, traveling due east past Olmstead Place State Park and the town of Kittitas. The freeway travels across a series of hills while following the Ryegrass Coulee, including a rest area at Ryegrass Hill near the Wild Horse Wind Farm. I-90 then reaches Vantage, where it travels past the Ginkgo Petrified Forest State Park, one of the largest collections of petrified trees in the world, before crossing the Columbia River on the Vantage Bridge. The bridge ascends up to the cliffs on the western shore of Grant County, where I-90 intersects SR 26 and turns north along the Babcock Bench. The freeway then passes several scenic viewpoints for Lake Wanapum and the Wild Horse Monument, a piece of public art placed atop a hill to the east.

Near Frenchman Coulee and The Gorge Amphitheatre, I-90 turns northeast towards George, where it intersects SR 281 and SR 283, providing access to Quincy and Ephrata, respectively. The freeway continues due east across rural Grant County, paralleled by a pair of frontage roads, past several sand dunes, state recreational areas, and the Potholes Reservoir. I-90 reaches Moses Lake by crossing the eponymous lake's western arm and intersecting SR 171, which serves as the city's main street. The freeway then crosses the Pelican Horn and intersects SR 17 before leaving the city, regaining its frontage roads as it continues east across rural Adams County by following several coulees. I-90 intersects the SR 21 east of the Schrag rest area and continues towards Ritzville, where a long concurrency with US 395 begins. The two highways intersect SR 261 and travel northeast along the BNSF railroad, which carries Amtrak's Empire Builder trains, to Sprague Lake in Lincoln County. In Sprague, I-90 intersects SR 23 just south of its junction with SR 231. From Sprague, the freeway passes the Fishtrap Recreation Area and crosses into Spokane County, where it alternates between interchanges with SR 904 and SR 902, which form loops serving Medical Lake and Cheney, respectively.

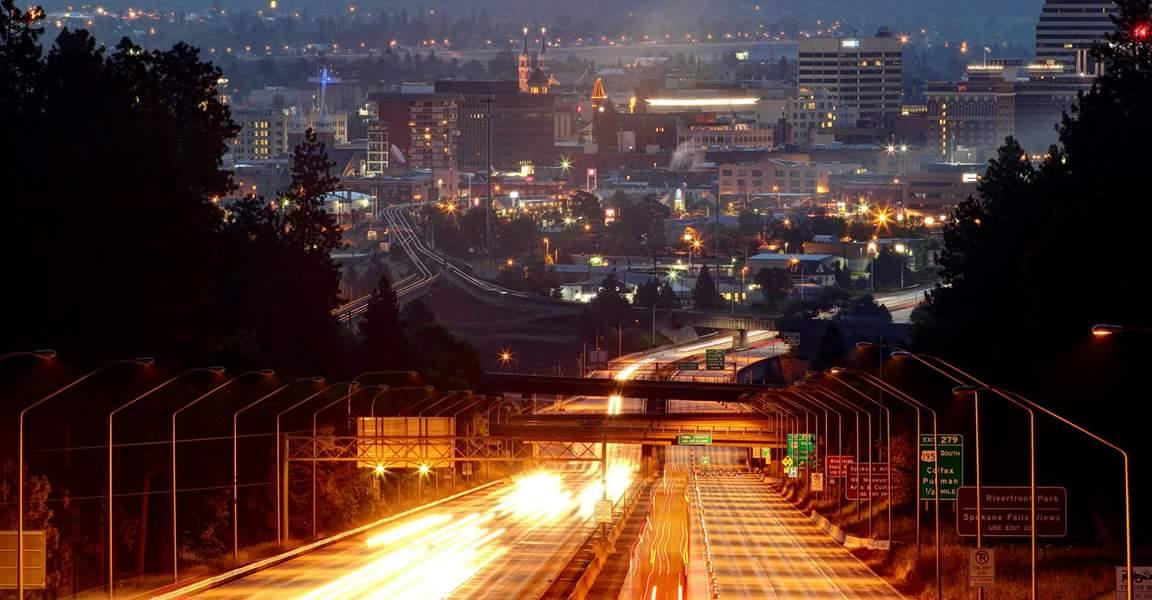
Eastbound I-90 as it descends Sunset Hill into downtown Spokane

I-90 and US 395 continue along the south side of Spokane International Airport and enter the city of Spokane, adding US 2 to the concurrency at an interchange near Sunset Hill. The three highways continue along Garden Springs Creek and the John A. Finch Arboretum to an interchange with US 195, located under several railroad overpasses. The freeway continues across Latah Creek into Downtown Spokane, where it travels on an elevated viaduct along 4th Avenue on the south side of downtown. The freeway passes the city's two hospitals (Deaconess and Sacred Heart) before intersecting Browne and Division streets, which carry US 2 and US 395 north through Spokane. I-90 then intersects SR 290 at the eastern edge of downtown, providing a connection across the Spokane River to the Gonzaga University campus.

The freeway continues east through Spokane's suburban neighborhoods, flanked by a pair of frontage roads that funnel traffic towards local streets at interchanges, and passes the future terminus of the North Spokane Corridor, a major freeway that will carry US 395 when completed. I-90 then enters Spokane Valley near Avista Stadium and the Interstate Fairgrounds. The freeway travels on the north side of the suburban city and intersects SR 27 near the Spokane Valley Mall. I-90 follows the Spokane River and Centennial Trail through Liberty Lake and to the Idaho state line. The freeway then continues across the Spokane River towards Post Falls and Coeur d'Alene.

== History ==
=== Early state roads ===
Snoqualmie Pass was historically used by the indigenous inhabitants of the Puget Sound and Columbia Plateau regions for trade and socializing in the summertime, as it was the lowest pass in the Cascades. The early trails from the pass were used by fur traders and settlers beginning in the 1850s, as it was the only route equipped to handle wagons and livestock. Snoqualmie Pass was later chosen for the region's first major cross-mountain road in the 1860s, having beaten the federal government's favored route over Naches Pass, and a rough wagon road was completed in October 1867 by a group of Seattle businessmen.

The wagon road was popular with settlers and cattle drivers from eastern Washington and was planned to be extended west to the Black River and east to the Yakima Valley using a $2,500 appropriation from the territorial government, but the funds proved insufficient and the project was shelved. The Snoqualmie wagon road was bought out in 1883 by the Seattle and Walla Walla Trail and Wagon Road Company and converted into a toll road to fund maintenance after the federal government declined to fund improvements to the road. The toll scheme was ultimately unsuccessful, as it failed to compete with the Northern Pacific Railway after it built its railroad across Stampede Pass to the south. The toll road was abandoned in 1893 and transferred to King and Klickitat counties, who contracted Denny to maintain and repair the road in 1899 with state money; by that time, sections of the road had deteriorated considerably, but approximately 200 wagons and 1,148 used the Snoqualmie Pass road that summer.

The rise of automobiles after the turn of the 20th century led to the state government funding and supporting new highways across Washington state. Snoqualmie Pass saw its first automobile crossing in 1905, the same year that the state government designated the route as part of State Road 7. State Road 7 began construction between North Bend and Easton in 1907 and became Washington's first trans-Cascades highway. Later that year, state highway commissioner Joseph M. Snow announced plans to extend the Snoqualmie Pass road west to Seattle and east to Spokane and the Idaho state line, using a road through Wenatchee. The cross-state extension was approved by the state legislature in 1909 and commemorated by a 23-day automobile race from New York City to Seattle for that year's Alaska–Yukon–Pacific Exposition; in total, 105 automobiles crossed Snoqualmie Pass in 1909. The racers and a group of Spokane motorists who drove across two years later described the road near Snoqualmie Pass as "impassible" with "treacherous" conditions, leaving much to be improved.

=== Sunset Highway and national routes ===
In 1912, the state good roads association endorsed the construction of three trunk highways across the state, including a 400-mile (640 km) route from the Puget Sound to Idaho over Snoqualmie Pass. The state legislature passed an appropriations bill in March 1913 that funded construction of the trunk routes, including a total of $506,834 for the cross-state road, dubbed the "Sunset Highway". Construction of the Sunset Highway through Snoqualmie Pass began in February 1914, with the goal of lowering the crossing of the pass by 117 feet (36 m) under the old wagon road. To extend the highway from Ellensburg to Spokane, the state highway board chose to route the Sunset Highway over a ferry crossing of the Columbia River at Vantage, then north to Wenatchee and Waterville along modern US 2. In Spokane, the Sunset Highway met the Central Washington Highway (State Road 11), which ran southwest through Cheney and Ritzville towards the Tri-Cities. The road across Snoqualmie Pass was mostly complete by September 1914, leading to plans for a formal dedication, but heavy rainfall delayed earthwork along the highway and postponed its use by motorists.

The completed Sunset Highway was briefly opened for traffic on October 1, 1914, before closing for the winter season. It reopened to traffic on June 20, 1915, and the highway was formally dedicated at the summit of Snoqualmie Pass on July 1, 1915, by a party of 400 motorists led by Governor Ernest Lister and Seattle Mayor Hiram Gill. Lister compared the highway's opening to the arrival of the transcontinental railroads and called the completion of the Sunset Highway the more important achievement for the state. In 1919, the state government rerouted the Sunset Highway between Ellensburg and Wenatchee, proposing a new branch through Blewett Pass in lieu of the ferry crossing at Vantage, which became part of the North Central Highway. The Blewett Pass highway was completed in May 1922, replacing a more dangerous wagon road across the pass. Portions of the Sunset Highway remained graded but unpaved until funds from the Federal Aid Road Act of 1916 were used to pave a gravel surface; some sections in King County were also upgraded with concrete pavement.

The Sunset Highway was renumbered to State Road 2, as part of a statewide reorganization of the highway system in 1923; the Vantage segment was retained as part of North Central Highway, renumbered as State Road 7, and the Ritzville–Spokane highway became part of State Road 11. The Sunset Highway became part of two transcontinental auto trails in the late 1920s: the National Park to Park Highway and the Yellowstone Trail, which was rerouted away from the Inland Empire Highway in 1925. The federal government established its own national highway system in 1926, designating the Sunset Highway as part of U.S. Route 10 (US 10), a transcontinental highway between Seattle and Detroit, Michigan. At the time, the 348-mile-long (560 km) Sunset Highway had 256 miles (412 km) with gravel paving, 70 miles (110 km) with cement pavement, 7 miles (11 km) with macadam, 6 miles (9.7 km) with bricks, and 4 miles (6.4 km) with asphalt concrete; only 3 miles (4.8 km) of the highway remained without any sort of pavement beyond graded dirt.

The state highway department continued work near the Snoqualmie and Blewett passes, including the staging of snow removal vehicles to allow for all-winter travel beginning in 1930–31 and a 12.4-mile-long (20.0 km) segment near Snoqualmie Pass being completely paved in 1933. The year-round access to Snoqualmie Pass led to a rise in local skiing, especially at the ski area operated by the Seattle city government. By the end of the decade, the entire Sunset Highway was paved with either asphalt or concrete. The state highway system was restructured once again in 1937, leading to the creation of primary and secondary highway designations. State Road 2 became Primary State Highway 2 (PSH 2), still retaining its concurrency with US 10; similar carryovers followed for State Road 7 and State Road 11, which became PSH 7 and PSH 11, respectively. A new highway, PSH 18, was created and ran from PSH 7 at Burke near Quincy and through Moses Lake to PSH 11 and US 395 in Ritzville. US 10 was rerouted onto the new Burke–Ritzville highway and a section of PSH 7 between Thorp and Burke, incorporating the original Vantage Bridge, in the early 1940s. The old alignment through Wenatchee, Coulee City, and Davenport, along with a new segment across Stevens Pass to Everett, was designated as US 10 Alternate in 1940. US 10 Alternate itself was usurped by the extension of US 2 from Sandpoint, Idaho, to Everett in 1946.

A second alternate route was established in the 1940s after the opening of the Lake Washington Floating Bridge between Seattle and Mercer Island. US 10 previously traveled between Seattle and Issaquah via the south side of the lake, passing through Renton and crossing the Issaquah Alps. The terminus of US 10 remained at the intersection of Airport Way and 4th Avenue South (carrying US 99) between King Street and Union stations, the city's main railroad terminals. The floating bridge was conceived by engineers in the 1930s as a replacement for the automobile ferries on the lake and was opened on July 2, 1940, after one year of construction. The bridge, which initially had a toll of 25 cents, reduced the drive to the pass by 14 miles (23 km) and encouraged new suburban development on the Eastside that grew in the following decades. A new section of US 10 between Issaquah and North Bend was also constructed the following year, bypassing the towns of Fall City and Snoqualmie. Upgrades to the Snoqualmie Pass section of the highway began in 1950, expanding the road to four lanes and constructing two snowsheds to protect motorists from avalanches. The $8.25 million project was completed in 1958.

=== Interstate designation and early construction ===
The federal government endorsed proposals for a transcontinental system of "superhighways" that were transmitted by the Roosevelt administration and the Bureau of Public Roads (BPR) to Congress in the late 1930s. In its 1939 report, the BPR proposed that one of the country's main toll highways run from Seattle across the northern Great Plains to Minneapolis and Chicago. Similar bills introduced by congressmen of the time proposed a transcontinental route across the northern U.S. originating in Seattle, with its eastern terminus as far as New York City or Boston. The toll roads concept was rejected, but the idea of transcontinental "superhighways" was further developed by an appointed committee into the 1944 Interregional Highways system plan, which included a route following the Sunset Highway from Seattle to Spokane and continuing along US 10 through to the Great Lakes region.

The Federal-Aid Highway Act of 1956, signed into law by President Dwight D. Eisenhower on June 29, 1956, formally authorized the creation and funding of the Interstate Highway System. The Seattle–Spokane corridor was designated as part of "Interstate 90", which continued east to Chicago and Boston, superseding US 10 through the northwestern United States. The first section to be completed under Interstate standards was a five-mile (8 km) section through Spokane Valley from Havana Street to Pines Road, which opened on November 16, 1956, and was credited with reducing the city's rate of collisions and had no fatal collisions until late 1958. The state government received $59.5 million in federal appropriations for 1957 to construct its first Interstate sections, including freeway bypasses of cities along US 10.

The Spokane Valley segment was extended east to Greenacres in November 1957 and west to Spokane in September 1958, terminating near the end of a proposed elevated freeway. It was extended 3.2 miles (5.1 km) further east to Liberty Lake in October 1964, stopping near the Idaho state line. The $5 million section from Burke Junction (near present-day George) to Moses Lake was opened in June 1958, connecting with a bypass of the city that required two new bridges. The freeway was later extended 25 miles (40 km) to the Vantage Bridge, which was reconstructed in 1962 due to the reservoir created by the Wanapum Dam. A 7-mile (11 km) section from Ritzville to Tokio opened in November 1959 and cost $3.8 million to construct. In October 1959, the state government completed construction of a divided highway spanning 22 miles (35 km) across Snoqualmie Pass to Easton, finishing the last section of four-lane highway between Seattle and Snoqualmie Pass. A 4-mile (6.4 km) extension from Easton to Cle Elum was dedicated by Governor Albert Rosellini on September 30, 1964.

=== Spokane freeway planning and construction ===
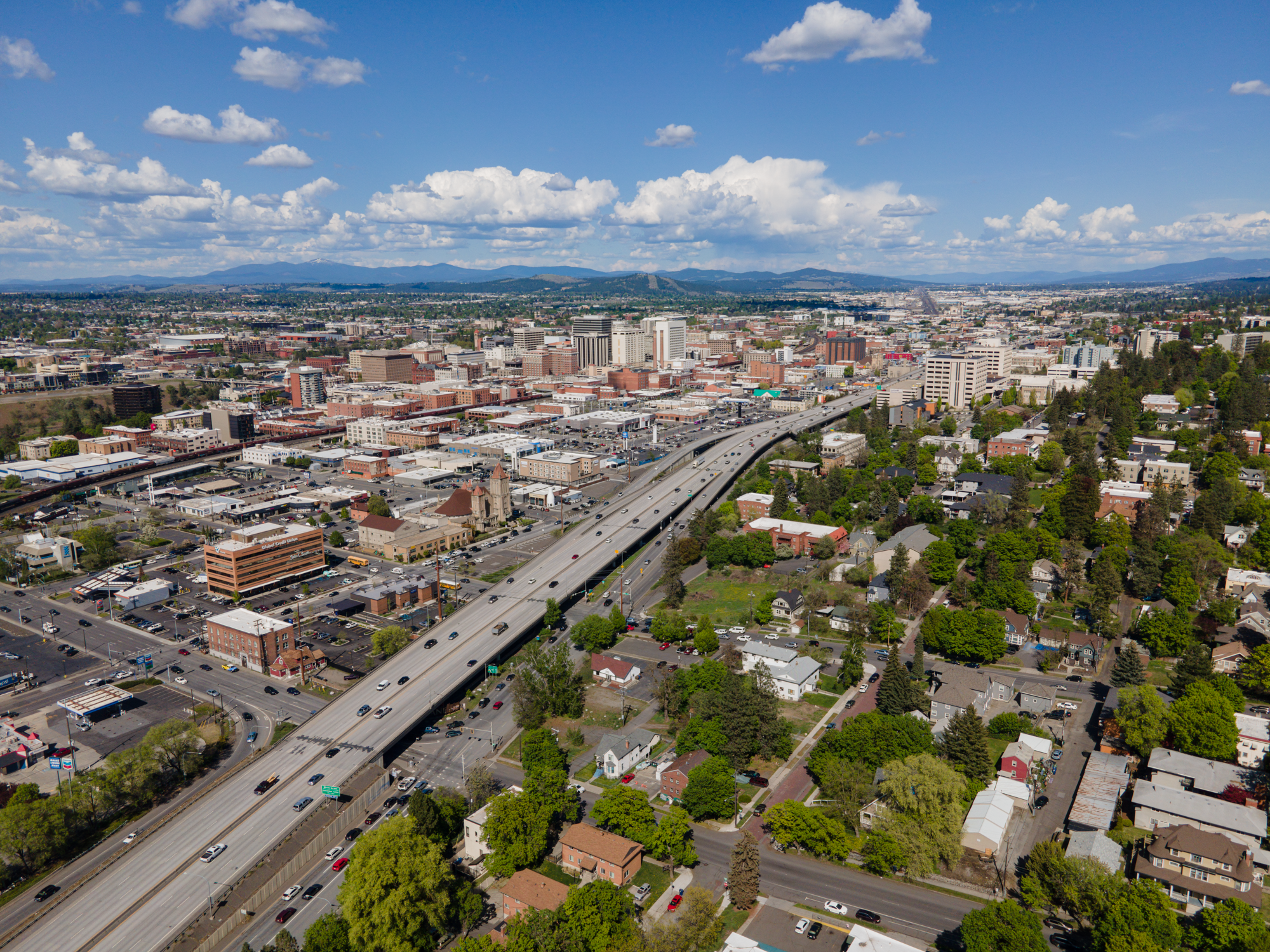
Aerial view of the downtown Spokane viaduct, constructed in stages between 1965 and 1971

Planning for the east–west freeway through Downtown Spokane began in the mid-1940s, with city leaders undecided on a specific route but generally favoring a corridor on the south side of the central business district. Among the options were a replacement of Riverside Avenue on the north side of downtown and an alignment along the edge of South Hill or through the hill via a tunnel. The public debate over the routing of the freeway in the late 1950s attracted opinions from various local organizations and members of the public, with one public hearing at the Spokane Coliseum attended by almost 500 people.

In March 1958, the state highway commission chose a southerly route that would be elevated above 4th and 5th avenues with six to eight lanes. The 3.88-mile (6.24 km) freeway would include major interchanges near Hangman Creek to connect with US 195 and at Liberty Park for the proposed north–south freeway, along with three downtown interchanges. The southerly route was deemed the most practical and cost $33 million, the lowest of the options, and was given preliminary approval by the Spokane City Council before being sent to the Bureau of Public Roads. The proposal was criticized for its proximity to the Deaconess Hospital, which was located 70 feet (21 m) from the route, and the campus of Lewis and Clark High School.

Officials from Deaconess Hospital lobbied the state government for a freeway noise study that would determine the effects of various routing options and asked the city council to delay its approval. The hospital also announced plans in July 1959 to expand its existing building in direct opposition to the state government's preferred freeway routing. Governor Rosellini endorsed a new study on the freeway's routing at the behest of Deaconess Hospital and other Spokane organizations, including an architect who proposed a route along the city's railroad viaduct. The state highway commissioned announced in September 1960 that it would continue to pursue the 3rd–4th alignment that had been originally chosen, with enhancements to prevent unnecessary noise next to the hospital, at the recommendation of the Bureau of Public Roads.

Construction of the Spokane Freeway began in 1961 with a section over Sunset Hill and the Hangman Creek bridges, which were completed in June 1963 at a cost of $2.2 million but remained closed to traffic. Deaconess Hospital's opposition delayed planning of the Spokane Freeway for several years, including a lawsuit it filed in 1963 to halt construction of the central section. An injunction was granted to halt construction in February 1964, but the case was overturned by the Washington Supreme Court in 1965. Contracts to construct the elevated freeway were divided into two-block segments, beginning with Maple and Cedar streets in September 1965.

The 9-mile (14 km) western section from Four Lakes near Cheney to Maple Street in Spokane was opened to traffic on December 7, 1965, along with expressways for US 2 and US 195. The freeway was extended 16.7 miles (26.9 km) southwest from Four Lakes to Tyler on November 18, 1966, following a dedication by Governor Daniel J. Evans, whose plane landed on the unopened lanes. The Spokane freeway was linked to the existing Ritzville bypass with the opening of the 23-mile (37 km) Tokio–Fishtrap section of I-90 on November 22, 1968, ahead of an Apple Cup game played at Joe Albi Stadium in Spokane. The elevated section through Downtown Spokane, spanning 6,600 feet (2,000 m) from Maple Street to Pine Street, opened on September 25, 1969, and cost a total of $15.3 million. The remaining 1.2 miles (1.9 km) from Pine Street to Helena Street, connecting with the Spokane Valley section, began construction in May 1969 and opened in August 1971.

A major interchange was constructed adjacent to Liberty Park east of downtown Spokane in 1974 to serve as the terminus of a north–south freeway that was later cancelled. The interchange was instead repurposed to carry a spur route of SR 290 after construction of a new bridge over the Spokane River was completed in 1984.

=== Later upgrades ===
In 1966, the state government completed an expansion of US 10 near Moses Lake to meet Interstate standards. A 24-mile (39 km) section of I-90 opened in August 1967, bypassing Cle Elum and the old Yakima River Highway to Ellensburg. It cost $17.7 million to construct and included 31 bridges, three crossings of the Yakima River, a high fence for elk, and several gravel pits that were converted into fishing ponds. The section was one of four runner-ups in a 1968 contest of the most beautiful highways in the United States organized by Parade magazine. The Vantage Highway, connecting Ellensburg to the Vantage Bridge, was replaced by a new alignment for I-90 that opened on November 20, 1968. The section included an interchange with I-82 in Ellensburg that would fully open to traffic in 1971.

On June 23, 1969, the Seattle–Spokane section of US 10 was removed from the national highway system, while the Spokane–Idaho segment remained until 1975. Later that year, the state highway commission unsuccessfully proposed a 92-mile (148 km) westward extension of I-90 from Seattle to Bremerton via a bridge over Puget Sound and continuing on to Aberdeen on the Pacific Ocean.

Expansion of the last two-lane section of I-90 in Eastern Washington, spanning 26 miles (42 km) from Schrag to Ritzville, began in August 1971 and was completed two years later at a cost of $16 million. A section of I-90 crossing the Washington–Idaho state line was upgraded to Interstate standards with the opening of the Post Falls bypass in July 1977. The final traffic signal on I-90 in Washington and what remained of US 10 was removed on October 13, 1978, with the opening of a bypass around North Bend. The section west of Snoqualmie Pass was widened in 1981 with the completion of a westbound viaduct over Denny Creek. The project also included demolition of the western snowshed near the summit.

=== Seattle construction and recent years ===
Initial planning for I-90 in Seattle included a proposed viaduct along Connecticut Street (later renamed Royal Brougham Way) from the interchange with I-5 westward to the Alaskan Way Viaduct as part of greater plans to build a ring road around Downtown Seattle. Approved with the whole concept by the Seattle City Council in 1963, the Connecticut Street Viaduct was never built as projected costs ballooned from $20 million to $33 million by 1973 despite the Federal Highway Administration agreeing to cover $12 million in designating a section of it as an Interstate Highway.

During the construction of the freeway between Seattle and Bellevue, lawsuits were filed on May 28, 1970, and stopped construction of I-90 for over a decade. In lieu of the incomplete connection to I-5, I-90 was temporarily routed on I-5 at Dearborn Street eastward onto Corwin Place South, a four-lane undivided road that transitioned into a controlled-access highway at its intersection with 17th Avenue South and South Lake Way before continuing towards the Mount Baker Tunnel. A reversible lane commencing eastward from Rainier Avenue South had been installed in 1960 to handle rush hour traffic, but it increased such that the lane's western terminus was extended to South Dearborn Street in 1981 to provide an exclusive high-occupancy vehicle lane during rush hour.

Today, I-90 crosses Lake Washington between Seattle and Bellevue on a pair of floating bridges that are two of the world's longest floating bridges. The westbound lanes travel on the Homer M. Hadley Memorial Bridge, the fifth longest floating bridge, and the eastbound lanes travel on the Lacey V. Murrow Memorial Bridge, the second longest floating bridge. The Lacey V. Murrow Memorial Bridge, originally called the Lake Washington Floating Bridge, opened on July 2, 1940. The bridge sank during construction on November 25, 1990. It was later rebuilt and the new bridge opened later in 1993. The second bridge, the Homer M. Hadley Memorial Bridge, opened on June 4, 1989, and carried bidirectional traffic until 1993, when it was convereted for westbound and reversible use only. The final section of Interstate 90 was opened in September 1993, costing $1.56 billion to complete the Seattle–Bellevue stretch. The final section's construction was described by local politicians as "the end of an era" and a "dinosaur" due to its conflicts with Seattle's long-term plans for transit and reducing driving.

In 1998, I-90 from Seattle to Thorp was designated the Mountains to Sound Greenway, a National Scenic Byway, to protect its outstanding scenic and cultural resources. The Mountains to Sound Greenway was also designated as a National Heritage Area in 2019.

Before 2003, Interstate 90 used to end at a signalled intersection with 4th Avenue S. However, increasing traffic from Downtown Seattle, Colman Dock, T-Mobile Park, and Lumen Field forced city, county, and state officials to look for improvements to the area. The first stage of the improvements, the SR 519 South Seattle Intermodal Access Project, included the construction of a new on-ramp to Interstate 90 via a new interchange with 4th Avenue S. and Edgar Martínez Drive S. (formerly S. Atlantic Street). Other projects are currently ongoing and have been completed in the recent years on I-90.

=== Snoqualmie Pass expansion ===
The Mountains to Sound Greenway was established in 1990 along the I-90 corridor to preserve wilderness and recreational areas between Seattle and Thorp on the east side of Snoqualmie Pass. It was designated as a National Scenic Byway in 1998, a first for an Interstate Highway, and a National Heritage Area in 2019.

The Snoqualmie Pass section was also home to one of the Interstate Highway System's few snowsheds, which had protected two westbound lanes along Keechelus Lake from avalanches and other debris. The 500-foot (150 m) snowshed was removed in 2014 and replaced with elevated bridges as part of a project to expand the freeway to six lanes along Keechelus Lake; an earlier plan to build a wider and longer snowshed in its place was scrapped due to additional costs associated with meeting ventilation and fire safety standards.

Other sections of the 15-mile (24 km) Snoqualmie Pass corridor were rebuilt in the 2010s and 2020s as part of a $1.3 billion megaproject. The second phase from Hyak to Stampede Pass included construction of the first wildlife crossing over a Washington highway. The third phase from Hyak to Easton began construction in 2022 and is scheduled to be completed in 2028 due to limited construction seasons. The project includes rock blasting and bridge replacements to accommodate the new lanes.

== Seattle–Bellevue express lanes ==
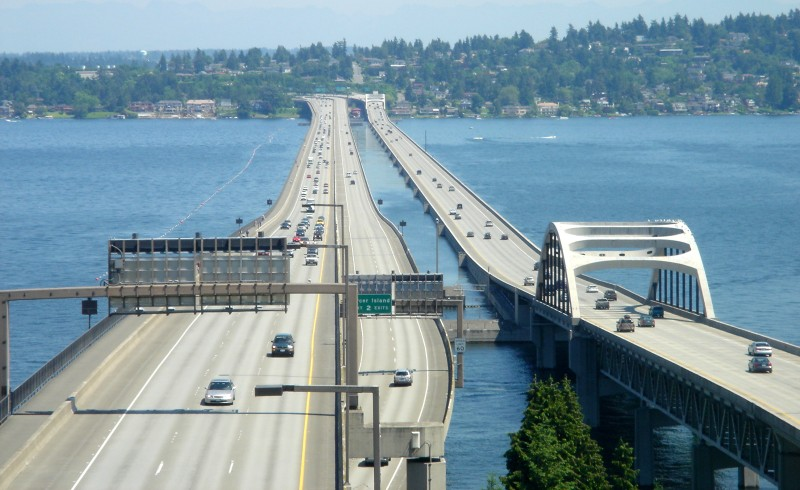
The twin floating bridge across Lake Washington, with the express lanes in the center

From 1992 to 2017, Interstate 90 had a 7.45-mile (11.99 km) network of express lanes from Downtown Seattle to Mercer Island and I-405 in Bellevue, including a set of reversible lanes on the Hadley floating bridge controlled by gates. Prior to their closure, the express lanes carried an annual average of 15,000 vehicles per day. The I-90 reversible express lanes were permanently closed on June 4, 2017, and were replaced by high-occupancy vehicle lanes on the outer lanes of the floating bridge. The right of way is now used for the 2 Line, a light rail line between Seattle and Redmond that opened in 2026.

The west end of the network was at the intersection of 5th Avenue, Airport Way, and Dearborn Street in the International District, adjacent to the Union Station complex and Lumen Field. The bi-directional, two-lane highway was joined by ramps from the Downtown Seattle Transit Tunnel, which carried Eastside bus routes through downtown until 2019, and continued along the north side of I-90 across its interchange with I-5. The express lanes crossed under the freeway's westbound lanes on the north side of Beacon Hill, continuing east in the median. The express lanes crossed Rainier Avenue on three overpasses, with the outer two serving as the bus-only approach and platform for the Rainier Freeway Station.

Through the Mount Baker Tunnel and on the Homer M. Hadley Memorial Bridge, the express lanes changed into a uni-directional reversible layout with three lanes, while a cross-weave interchange allowed buses to re-enter the mainline lanes and high-occupancy vehicles and single-occupant Mercer Island traffic into the express lanes. On Mercer Island, the express lanes had exits to 77th Avenue Southeast, 80th Avenue Southeast, and Island Crest Way, as well as a westbound entrance from the mainline HOV lanes. The 80th Avenue Southeast ramp was converted to a HOV-only westbound offramp for the mainline lanes in 2012. The eastbound-only express lanes then crossed the East Channel Bridge and merged back into the mainline HOV lanes, with ramps that served Bellevue Way and I-405.

During the last years of operation, the reversible portion of the express lanes carried westbound traffic from 6 a.m. to 12:30 p.m. and eastbound traffic from 2 p.m. to 5 a.m. on weekdays. The express lanes remained opened to eastbound from Friday afternoon to 5 a.m. on Monday, except for special weekend events. The express lanes changed direction at midnight prior to 2012, when the I-5 express lanes were automated, allowing for a single crew to be used for both systems.

== Exit list ==
| County | Location | mi | km | Exit | Destinations | Notes |
|---|---|---|---|---|---|---|
| King | Seattle | 0.00 | 0.00 | 1A | Edgar Martínez Drive South, South Atlantic Street | Westbound exit and eastbound entrance |
| King | Seattle | 0.00 | 0.00 | 1B | SR 519 north / 4th Avenue South – Seattle City Center, Amtrak, Ferries, T-Mobile Park, Lumen Field | Westbound exit and eastbound entrance |
| King | Seattle | 0.32 | 0.51 | 2 | I-5 – Vancouver, Tacoma, Portland, James Street, Madison Street | Signed as exits 2A (south) and 2B (north) eastbound and 2B (south) and 2C (north) westbound |
| King | Seattle | 1.39 | 2.24 | 3 | Rainier Avenue | Signed as exits 3A (south) and 3B (north) westbound; no westbound entrance |
| King | Lake Washington | 2.13 | 3.43 | Lacey V. Murrow Memorial Bridge (eastbound); Homer M. Hadley Memorial Bridge (westbound) | | |
| King | Mercer Island | 4.09 | 6.58 | 6 | West Mercer Way | Eastbound exit and westbound entrance |
| King | Mercer Island | 4.91 | 7.90 | 7A | 77th Avenue Southeast | Eastbound exit and westbound entrance |
| King | Mercer Island | 5.07 | 8.16 | ♦ | 80th Avenue Southeast | HOV only; westbound exit and eastbound entrance |
| King | Mercer Island | 5.17 | 8.32 | 7B | Island Crest Way | Signed as exit 7 westbound; HOV-only westbound entrance |
| King | Mercer Island | 6.41 | 10.32 | 8 | East Mercer Way | |
| King | Lake Washington | 6.78 | 10.91 | East Channel Bridge | | |
| King | Bellevue | 7.19 | 11.57 | 9 | Bellevue Way | |
| King | Bellevue | 7.98 | 12.84 | 10A | I-405 – Everett, Renton | Signed as exit 10 westbound |
| King | Bellevue | 8.23 | 13.24 | 10B | Factoria Boulevard – Factoria | Eastbound exit and westbound entrance |
| King | Bellevue | 9.09 | 14.63 | ♦ | 142nd Place Southeast | HOV only |
| King | Bellevue | 9.60 | 15.45 | 11B | 148th Avenue Southeast – Bellevue College | Westbound exit is via 156th Avenue |
| King | Bellevue | 9.60 | 15.45 | 11A | 150th Avenue Southeast, 156th Avenue Southeast | Signed as exit 11 westbound |
| King | Bellevue | | | 11 | 161st Avenue Southeast | Eastbound exit is via 150th Avenue |
| King | Bellevue | 11.73 | 18.88 | 13 | West Lake Sammamish Parkway, Lakemont Boulevard Southeast, Southeast Newport Way | |
| King | Issaquah | 13.89 | 22.35 | 15 | SR 900 west (17th Avenue Northwest) – Renton | |
| King | Issaquah | 15.20 | 24.46 | 17 | Front Street, East Lake Sammamish Parkway Southeast | |
| King | Issaquah | 16.13 | 25.96 | 18 | East Sunset Way, Highlands Drive | |
| King | | 18.32 | 29.48 | 20 | High Point Way | |
| King | | 20.59 | 33.14 | 22 | Preston, Fall City | |
| King | | 23.72 | 38.17 | 25 | SR 18 west / Snoqualmie Parkway – Auburn, Tacoma | |
| King | | 25.40 | 40.88 | 27 | Snoqualmie, North Bend | Eastbound exit and westbound entrance |
| King | North Bend | 28.63 | 46.08 | 31 | SR 202 west – North Bend, Snoqualmie | |
| King | | 30.95 | 49.81 | 32 | 436th Avenue Southeast | |
| King | | 33.06 | 53.20 | 34 | 468th Avenue Southeast | |
| King | | 36.14 | 58.16 | 38 | Washington State Fire Training Academy, Olallie State Park | Eastbound exit and westbound entrance |
| King | | 37.96 | 61.09 | 38 | Washington State Fire Training Academy, Olallie State Park | Westbound exit and eastbound entrance |
| King | | 40.68 | 65.47 | 42 | Tinkham Road | |
| King | | 43.91 | 70.67 | 45 | USFS Road 9030 | |
| King | | 46.09 | 74.17 | 47 | Denny Creek, Asahel Curtis | |
| King | Snoqualmie Pass | 50.58 | 81.40 | 52 | SR 906 – West Summit, Alpental | Eastbound exit and westbound entrance |
| Kittitas | Snoqualmie Pass | 51.29 | 82.54 | 53 | East Summit, Snoqualmie Pass Recreational Area | |
| Kittitas | Snoqualmie Pass | 53.03 | 85.34 | 54 | SR 906 – Hyak, Gold Creek | Access to SR 906 |
| Kittitas | | 61.30 | 98.65 | 62 | Stampede Pass, Lake Kachess | |
| Kittitas | | 62.31 | 100.28 | 63 | Cabin Creek Road | |
| Kittitas | | 68.63 | 110.45 | 70 | Sparks Road – Easton | |
| Kittitas | | 69.85 | 112.41 | 71 | Easton | |
| Kittitas | | 72.34 | 116.42 | 74 | West Nelson Siding Road | |
| Kittitas | | 76.35 | 122.87 | 78 | Golf Course Road | |
| Kittitas | | 78.60 | 126.49 | 80 | Roslyn, Suncadia | |
| Kittitas | Cle Elum | 81.41– 82.49 | 131.02– 132.75 | 84 | Cle Elum, South Cle Elum | |
| Kittitas | | 84.15 | 135.43 | 85 | SR 903 north / SR 970 – Cle Elum, Wenatchee | |
| Kittitas | | 91.91 | 147.91 | 93 | Elk Heights Road | |
| Kittitas | | 99.36 | 159.90 | 101 | Thorp Highway – Thorp | |
| Kittitas | | 104.35 | 167.94 | 106 | US 97 north – Ellensburg, Wenatchee | Western end of US 97 overlap |
| Kittitas | Ellensburg | 107.65 | 173.25 | 109 | I-90 BL (Canyon Road) – Ellensburg | |
| Kittitas | | 109.15 | 175.66 | 110 | I-82 east / US 97 south – Yakima | Eastern end of US 97 overlap |
| Kittitas | | 113.76 | 183.08 | 115 | Kittitas | |
| Kittitas | | 134.72 | 216.81 | 136 | Huntzinger Road – Vantage | |
| Columbia River | | 135.72 | 218.42 | Vantage Bridge | | |
| Grant | | 136.08 | 219.00 | 137 | SR 26 east to SR 243 – Othello, Pullman, Richland | |
| Grant | | 139.65 | 224.74 | 139 | Scenic View (Wild Horse Monument) | |
| Grant | | 142.14 | 228.75 | 143 | Silica Road | |
| Grant | | 148.07 | 238.30 | 149 | SR 281 north – Quincy, Wenatchee, George | |
| Grant | | 150.02 | 241.43 | 151 | SR 283 north / SR 281 north (via SR 281 Spur) – Ephrata, Soap Lake, Quincy, Wenatchee | |
| Grant | | 152.90 | 246.07 | 154 | Adams Road | |
| Grant | | 162.88 | 262.13 | 164 | Dodson Road | |
| Grant | | 167.96 | 270.31 | 169 | Hiawatha Road | |
| Grant | Moses Lake | 172.89 | 278.24 | 174 | Hansen Road – Mae Valley | |
| Grant | Moses Lake | 173.69 | 279.53 | 175 | Westshore Drive – Mae Valley | Westbound exit only |
| Grant | Moses Lake | 174.28 | 280.48 | 176 | I-90 BL east / SR 171 north – Moses Lake | |
| Grant | Moses Lake | 177.74 | 286.04 | 179 | SR 17 / I-90 BL west – Moses Lake, Ephrata, Othello | |
| Grant | | 181.12 | 291.48 | 182 | O Road Northeast/Southeast – Wheeler | |
| Grant | | 183.18 | 294.80 | 184 | Q Road Northeast/Southeast | |
| Grant | | 187.18 | 301.24 | 188 | U Road Northeast/Southeast – Warden | |
| Adams | | 195.20 | 314.14 | 196 | Deal Road – Schrag | |
| Adams | | 205.13 | 330.12 | 206 | SR 21 – Lind, Odessa | |
| Adams | | 213.52 | 343.63 | 215 | Paha, Packard | |
| Adams | | 218.21– 218.49 | 351.17– 351.63 | 220 | US 395 south / I-90 BL east – Ritzville, Pasco (Tri-Cities) | Western end of US 395 overlap |
| Adams | | 219.67 | 353.52 | 221 | SR 261 south – Ritzville, Washtucna | |
| Adams | | 224.14 | 360.72 | 226 | Schoessler Road | |
| Adams | | 228.95 | 368.46 | 231 | Tokio, Weigh Station | |
| Lincoln | Sprague | 242.98 | 391.04 | 245 | SR 23 – Sprague, Harrington | |
| Lincoln | | 251.74 | 405.14 | 254 | Fishtrap | |
| Spokane | | 255.41 | 411.04 | 257 | SR 904 east – Tyler, Cheney | |
| Spokane | | 262.02 | 421.68 | 264 | SR 902 east (Salnave Road) – Cheney, Medical Lake | |
| Spokane | | 268.27 | 431.74 | 270 | SR 904 west – Four Lakes, Cheney | |
| Spokane | | 270.53 | 435.38 | 272 | SR 902 west – Medical Lake, Washington State Veterans Cemetery | |
| Spokane | | 274.04 | 441.02 | 276 | Geiger Boulevard / Grove Road | Former I-90 Bus. |
| Spokane | Spokane | 275.45 | 443.29 | 277B | US 2 west – Spokane Airport, Fairchild AFB, Davenport | Western end of US 2 overlap; signed as exit 277 westbound |
| Spokane | Spokane | 275.92 | 444.05 | 277A | Garden Springs – Spokane Falls Community College | Signed as exit 277 westbound; no entrance ramps |
| Spokane | Spokane | 277.06 | 445.88 | 279 | US 195 south – Colfax, Pullman | |
| Spokane | Spokane | 277.88 | 447.20 | 280A | Maple Street, Walnut Street | Signed as exit 280 eastbound |
| Spokane | Spokane | 278.64 | 448.43 | 280B | Lincoln Street | Eastbound exit is via exit 280 |
| Spokane | Spokane | 279.05 | 449.09 | 281 | US 2 east / US 395 north (Division Street) – Newport, Colville | Eastern end of US 2/US 395 overlap |
| Spokane | Spokane | 279.83 | 450.34 | 282A | SR 290 east (Trent Avenue) / Hamilton Street | Signed as exit 282 eastbound |
| Spokane | Spokane | 280.08 | 450.75 | 282B | Second Avenue | Westbound exit only |
| Spokane | Spokane | 280.74 | 451.81 | 283A | Altamont Street | |
| Spokane | Spokane | 281.44 | 452.93 | 283B | Thor Street, Freya Street | |
| Spokane | Spokane–Spokane Valley city line | 282.05 | 453.92 | — | Havana Street | Eastbound entrance only |
| Spokane | Spokane Valley | 283.32 | 455.96 | 285 | I-90 BL east (Appleway Boulevard) / Sprague Avenue | No eastbound entrance; former I-90 Bus. west |
| Spokane | Spokane Valley | 283.95 | 456.97 | 286 | Broadway Avenue | |
| Spokane | Spokane Valley | 285.54 | 459.53 | 287 | Argonne Road – Millwood, Mount Spokane State Park | |
| Spokane | Spokane Valley | 287.56 | 462.78 | 289 | SR 27 (Pines Road) | |
| Spokane | Spokane Valley | 288.74 | 464.68 | 291A | Evergreen Road – Spokane Valley Mall | |
| Spokane | Spokane Valley | 289.62 | 466.10 | 291B | Sullivan Road | |
| Spokane | Spokane Valley | 291.66 | 469.38 | 293 | I-90 BL west (Barker Road) | |
| Spokane | Liberty Lake | 292.63 | 470.94 | 294 | Country Vista Drive, Appleway Avenue | Westbound exit and eastbound entrance |
| Spokane | Liberty Lake | 293.89 | 472.97 | 296 | Liberty Lake, Otis Orchards | |
| Spokane | Spokane Bridge | 297.20 | 478.30 | 299 | Spokane Bridge Road – State Line | |
| Spokane | Spokane Bridge | 297.52 | 478.81 | — | I-90 east – Coeur d'Alene | Continuation into Idaho |
1.000 mi = 1.609 km; 1.000 km = 0.621 mi: Concurrency terminus; Incomplete access

=== Express lane exits ===
This table reflects the final configuration of the express lanes in 2012, prior to its reconfiguration and closure. The entire route was in King County.

| Location | mi | km | Exit | Destinations | Notes |
|---|---|---|---|---|---|
| Seattle | 0.00 | 0.00 | ♦ | Airport Way South, South Dearborn Street | HOV entrance and exit only |
| Seattle | 0.23 | 0.37 | ♦ | Downtown Seattle Transit Tunnel | Bus only |
| Seattle | 1.22 | 1.96 | ♦ | Rainier Freeway Station | Bus only |
| Seattle | 1.67 | 2.69 | — | I-90 west to I-5 | Westbound off-ramp only (All Mercer Island SOVs exit here) |
| Seattle | 1.88 | 3.03 | — | I-90 east | Eastbound on-ramp only (All Mercer Island SOVs enter here) |
| Mercer Island | 4.59 | 7.39 | 7A | 77th Avenue SE | |
| Mercer Island | 4.81 | 7.74 | 7B | Island Crest Way | All Mercer Island SOVs enter or exit here |
| Mercer Island | 5.46 | 8.79 | ♦ 7C | 80th Avenue SE | HOV entrance and exit only; converted to an HOV-only outer entrance in 2012 |
| Mercer Island | 6.02 | 9.69 | ♦ | I-90 west | Westbound HOV entrance only |
| Mercer Island | 6.61 | 10.64 | ♦ | I-90 east | Eastbound HOV exit only |
| Bellevue | 6.91 | 11.12 | ♦ | I-405 | Eastbound HOV entrance only |
| Bellevue | 6.91 | 11.12 | ♦ 9 | Bellevue Way | HOV entrance and exit only |
1.000 mi = 1.609 km; 1.000 km = 0.621 mi: Closed/former; HOV only; Incomplete access

== See also ==
- Wildlife crossing § I-90 near Snoqualmie Pass

Interstate 90
| Previous state: Terminus | Washington | Next state: Idaho |
