= List of shopping malls in Washington (state) =

Aerial view of Spokane Valley Mall, a suburban enclosed shopping center that opened in 1997

The U.S. state of Washington has over 30 shopping malls, primarily in the major metropolitan areas of Seattle and Spokane as well as regional cities. Several shopping malls in the Seattle area, specifically in Bellevue, have positioned themselves as luxury options. Most of the state's large enclosed shopping malls developed in the mid-to-late 20th century, beginning with the 1950 opening of Northgate Mall in Seattle. The largest shopping mall in Washington is Southcenter Mall in the southern Seattle suburb of Tukwila, which has 1.7 million square feet (160,000 m^{2}) of retail space. Other large malls include Alderwood Mall in Lynnwood, Bellevue Square, and Tacoma Mall. Several malls in the Seattle area underwent major redevelopment in the 2010s and 2020s to add housing and become mixed-use centers. The trend began in response to a general decline in physical retail sales had affected patronage.

== List of shopping malls ==
Mall	City	County	Type	Opened	Stores	Gross leasable area	Ref.
Alderwood	Lynnwood	Snohomish	Indoor	1979	170	1,300,000 sq ft (120,774 m^{2})	
Bellevue Square	Bellevue	King	Indoor	1946 (Note: Bellevue Square opened in 1946 and was converted into an enclosed shopping center in 1955.)		1,350,000 sq ft (125,419 m^{2})	
Bellis Fair Mall	Bellingham	Whatcom	Indoor	1988	80	775,000 sq ft (72,000 m^{2})	
Capital Mall	Olympia	Thurston	Indoor	1978	106	1,061,200 sq ft (98,589 m^{2})	
Columbia Center	Kennewick	Benton	Indoor	1969		763,413 sq ft (70,923 m^{2})	
The Commons at Federal Way	Federal Way	King	Indoor	1975	100	783,299 sq ft (72,771 m^{2})	
Crossroads Shopping Center	Bellevue	King	Indoor	1961	80	475,000 sq ft (44,129 m^{2})	
The District at Northgate	Seattle	King	Outdoor	1950		1,000,000 sq ft (92,903 m^{2}) (Note: Figure prior to major redevelopment project that began in 2018.)	
Everett Mall	Everett	Snohomish	Indoor	1974		800,000 sq ft (74,322 m^{2}) (Note: Figure prior to major redevelopment project that began in 2025.)	
Kitsap Mall	Silverdale	Kitsap	Indoor	1985		761,639 sq ft (70,759 m^{2})	
Lakewood Towne Center	Lakewood	Pierce	Outdoor	2002 (Note: Built on the site of Lakewood Mall, an enclosed shopping center that opened in 1989 and closed in 2001.)			
Lincoln Square	Bellevue	King	Indoor	2005			
Marketplace at Factoria	Bellevue	King	Indoor	1977			
Mill Creek Town Center	Mill Creek	Snohomish	Outdoor	2004			
NorthTown Mall	Spokane	Spokane	Indoor	1955		915,000 sq ft (85,006 m^{2})	
The Outlet Collection Seattle	Auburn	King	Indoor	1995		920,000 sq ft (85,471 m^{2})	
Quil Ceda Village	Marysville	Snohomish	Outdoor	2001			
Pacific Place	Seattle	King	Indoor	1998		339,000 sq ft (31,494 m^{2})	
Redmond Town Center	Bellevue	King	Indoor	1997	110	500,000 sq ft (46,452 m^{2})	
River Park Square	Spokane	Spokane	Indoor	1974	50	373,000 sq ft (34,653 m^{2})	
Seattle Premium Outlets	Marysville	Snohomish	Outdoor	2005		554,531 sq ft (51,518 m^{2})	
South Hill Mall	Puyallup	Pierce	Indoor	1989			
Spokane Valley Mall	Spokane Valley	Spokane	Indoor	1997		841,000 sq ft (78,131 m^{2})	
Tacoma Mall	Tacoma	Pierce	Indoor	1965		1,260,754 sq ft (117,128 m^{2})	
Three Rivers Mall	Kelso	Cowlitz	Indoor	1987			
Town Center at Lake Forest Park	Lake Forest Park	King	Outdoor	1964		250,130 sq ft (23,238 m^{2})	
University Village	Seattle	King	Outdoor	1956			
Vancouver Mall	Vancouver	Clark	Indoor	1977			
Valley Mall	Union Gap	Yakima	Indoor	1972			
The Village at Totem Lake	Kirkland	King	Outdoor	2016 (Note: The original Totem Lake Mall on the site of The Village at Totem Lake was an enclosed shopping center that opened and was demolished in 2016.)			
Walla Walla Town Center	Walla Walla	Walla Walla	Indoor	2018 (Note: The Walla Walla Town Center was built on the site of the demolished Blue Mountain Mall.)		120,169 sq ft (11,164 m^{2})	
Wenatchee Valley Mall	East Wenatchee	Douglas	Indoor	1978			
Westfield Southcenter	Tukwila	King	Indoor	1968		1,658,719 sq ft (154,100 m^{2})	
Westlake Center	Seattle	King	Indoor	1988		118,222 sq ft (10,983 m^{2})	

== Former enclosed shopping malls ==
- Blue Mountain Mall (Walla Walla; demolished in 2017 and replaced by Walla Walla Town Center)
- Cascade Mall (Burlington; indoor sections closed in 2020)
- Lakewood Mall (1989–2001; replaced by Lakewood Towne Center)
- Shoppes at Riverside (Aberdeen; closed in February 2021)
- South Sound Center (Lacey; indoor sections demolished in 2000)
- Tower Mall (Vancouver; demolished in 2021)
