= Snoqualmie Pass, Washington =

- Census-designated place
- Location of Snoqualmie Pass, Washington
- Coordinates: 47°23′32″N 121°24′0″W
- Country: United States
- State: Washington
- County: Kittitas

Area
  - Total: 2.93 sq mi (7.58 km^{2})
  - Land: 2.93 sq mi (7.58 km^{2})
  - Water: 0 sq mi (0.0 km^{2})
- Elevation: 2,963 ft (903 m)

Population (2020)
  - Total: 372
  - Density: 127/sq mi (49.1/km^{2})
- Time zone: UTC-8 (Pacific (PST))
  - Summer (DST): UTC-7 (PDT)
- ZIP code: 98068
- Area code: 425
- FIPS code: 53-65275
- GNIS feature ID: 2408752

Snoqualmie Pass is a census-designated place (CDP) in Kittitas County, Washington, United States. It includes the unincorporated community of Hyak. As of the 2020 census, Snoqualmie Pass had a population of 372.

The CDP is named for the mountain pass that carries Interstate 90 across the Cascade Range, which itself is named for the Snoqualmie tribe, a Native American tribe indigenous to the Snoqualmie Valley located west of the pass. The portion of the mountain pass west of the height of land, in King County, is not part of the Snoqualmie Pass CDP.

Based on per capita income, Snoqualmie Pass ranks 8th of 522 areas in the state of Washington to be ranked. It is also the highest rank achieved in Kittitas County.

== Recreation ==
The area consists of mountain chalets and condominiums that are mainly seasonally occupied by residents of the Seattle metropolitan area, with approximately 300 year-round residents. Winter sports are the main draw, but outdoor recreation is available year-round.

The Pacific Crest Trail crosses through Snoqualmie Pass, and a variety of other trails are also available for hiking and climbing in the summer and cross-country skiing and snowshoeing in the winter.

Snoqualmie Pass is the site of the Summit at Snoqualmie, a group of alpine ski areas managed by Boyne USA Resorts. The Summit consists of four ski areas: Alpental, Summit West (formerly named Snoqualmie Summit), Summit Central (formerly Ski Acres), and Summit East (formerly Hyak). The Summit at Snoqualmie is the closest ski area to Seattle, so it is often crowded on weekends. Iron Horse State Park in Hyak offers groomed cross-country ski trails, sledding and snowshoeing in winter and hiking and a gravel railroad bed for hiking and bicycling in the summer.

Snowmobiling just east of the pass is also popular during the winter months. Also in the summer and fall, paragliders and hang gliders may be seen flying above the valley, along the ridge and landing at Lake Keechelus.

== Geography ==
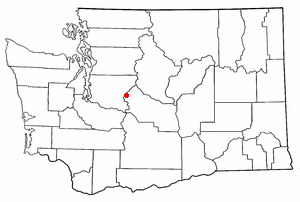
Location of Snoqualmie Pass, Washington

The community is in westernmost Kittitas County, on the east side of Snoqualmie Pass. Its western border follows the King County border, which is also the height of land of the Cascade Range. The CDP extends southeast as far as Keechelus Lake, the source of the Yakima River. The unincorporated community of Hyak is in the southeast part of the CDP.

Interstate 90 passes through the community, with access from Exits 53 and 54. I-90 leads west 53 miles (85 km) to Seattle and southeast the same distance to Ellensburg, the Kittitas county seat. Washington State Route 906 serves as a local main road through the Snoqualmie Pass community, connecting with I-90 at both of its exits.

According to the United States Census Bureau, the Snoqualmie Pass CDP has a total area of 2.9 square miles (7.6 km^{2}), all of it land. Situated at a main crossing point of the Cascade Range, Snoqualmie Pass is located along the Mountains to Sound Greenway, which spans parts of King and Kittitas counties. The eastern portal of the 2.2-mile-long (3.5 km) Snoqualmie Tunnel is in the CDP at Hyak.

=== Climate ===
Due to its elevation, Snoqualmie Pass experiences significantly lower temperatures than Seattle, and receives much more precipitation, much of it being snow. Snoqualmie Pass has a humid continental climate (Koppen: Dsb bordering Csb) with cold, very wet and snowy winters, and mild to warm, relatively dry summers.

Climate data for Snoqualmie Pass, Washington, (1915–1972 normals and extremes)
Month	Jan	Feb	Mar	Apr	May	Jun	Jul	Aug	Sep	Oct	Nov	Dec	Year
Record high °F (°C)	56 (13)	61 (16)	69 (21)	81 (27)	84 (29)	94 (34)	101 (38)	98 (37)	101 (38)	88 (31)	65 (18)	53 (12)	101 (38)
Mean maximum °F (°C)	44.0 (6.7)	47.8 (8.8)	55.2 (12.9)	65.1 (18.4)	74.2 (23.4)	81.3 (27.4)	86.6 (30.3)	85.4 (29.7)	81.0 (27.2)	70.7 (21.5)	52.2 (11.2)	45.0 (7.2)	88.3 (31.3)
Mean daily maximum °F (°C)	32.4 (0.2)	37.4 (3.0)	42.6 (5.9)	49.0 (9.4)	56.5 (13.6)	63.0 (17.2)	70.3 (21.3)	69.6 (20.9)	63.9 (17.7)	53.9 (12.2)	40.1 (4.5)	33.9 (1.1)	51.0 (10.6)
Daily mean °F (°C)	25.9 (−3.4)	29.8 (−1.2)	34.1 (1.2)	39.3 (4.1)	45.3 (7.4)	51.4 (10.8)	57.8 (14.3)	57.5 (14.2)	52.4 (11.3)	44.4 (6.9)	34.2 (1.2)	28.6 (−1.9)	41.7 (5.4)
Mean daily minimum °F (°C)	20.9 (−6.2)	23.3 (−4.8)	26.0 (−3.3)	30.0 (−1.1)	34.2 (1.2)	40.0 (4.4)	45.6 (7.6)	45.7 (7.6)	41.1 (5.1)	35.0 (1.7)	28.2 (−2.1)	23.5 (−4.7)	32.8 (0.4)
Mean minimum °F (°C)	2.3 (−16.5)	7.6 (−13.6)	13.1 (−10.5)	20.3 (−6.5)	26.5 (−3.1)	33.0 (0.6)	36.7 (2.6)	37.0 (2.8)	30.5 (−0.8)	24.9 (−3.9)	16.8 (−8.4)	8.1 (−13.3)	−2.3 (−19.1)
Record low °F (°C)	−17 (−27)	−15 (−26)	0 (−18)	7 (−14)	16 (−9)	27 (−3)	30 (−1)	27 (−3)	22 (−6)	11 (−12)	0 (−18)	−19 (−28)	−19 (−28)
Average precipitation inches (mm)	15.44 (392)	11.33 (288)	10.37 (263)	5.87 (149)	3.86 (98)	3.70 (94)	1.37 (35)	2.14 (54)	4.56 (116)	8.98 (228)	13.17 (335)	16.72 (425)	97.51 (2,477)
Average snowfall inches (cm)	100.8 (256)	72.4 (184)	66.3 (168)	24.0 (61)	5.2 (13)	0.3 (0.76)	0.0 (0.0)	0.0 (0.0)	0.1 (0.25)	6.6 (17)	39.9 (101)	83.9 (213)	399.5 (1,014.01)
Average precipitation days (≥ 0.01 in)	18.8	15.8	17.4	13.9	11.3	10.1	5.0	6.4	9.1	12.8	16.2	19.9	156.7
Average snowy days (≥ 0.1 in)	15.8	11.9	11.6	5.7	1.6	0.1	0.0	0.0	0.0	1.8	8.2	14.5	71.2
Average relative humidity (%)	93	93	91	86	80	76	69	70	75	81	89	92	83
Mean daily sunshine hours	3.0	3.0	4.3	6.5	8.4	9.4	10.7	10.9	8.7	5.1	3.8	3.1	6.4
Mean daily daylight hours	9.0	10.3	12.0	13.7	15.1	15.9	15.5	14.2	12.5	10.8	9.3	8.5	12.2
Average ultraviolet index	1	1	2	2	3	4	5	3	2	2	1	1	2
Source 1: XMACIS (temps 1915–1972, precip/precip days 1912–2000, snow/snow days 1910–2002)
Source 2: Weather Atlas (UV and humidity)

== Demographics ==
Historical population
Census	Pop.	Note	%±
2000	201		—
2010	311		54.7%
2020	372		19.6%
U.S. Decennial Census; 1990 2000 2010

Snoqualmie Pass first appeared as a census designated place in the 2000 U.S. census.

=== Racial and ethnic composition ===
Snoqualmie Pass CDP, Washington – Racial and ethnic composition Note: the US Census treats Hispanic/Latino as an ethnic category. This table excludes Latinos from the racial categories and assigns them to a separate category. Hispanics/Latinos may be of any race.
Race / Ethnicity (NH = Non-Hispanic)	Pop 2000	Pop 2010	Pop 2020	% 2000	% 2010	% 2020
White alone (NH)	186	273	316	92.54%	87.78%	84.95%
Black or African American alone (NH)	0	1	0	0.00%	0.32%	0.00%
Native American or Alaska Native alone (NH)	0	4	4	0.00%	1.29%	1.08%
Asian alone (NH)	2	4	13	1.00%	1.29%	3.49%
Native Hawaiian or Pacific Islander alone (NH)	2	0	0	1.00%	0.00%	0.00%
Other race alone (NH)	0	5	3	0.00%	1.61%	0.81%
Mixed race or Multiracial (NH)	10	6	12	4.98%	1.93%	3.23%
Hispanic or Latino (any race)	1	18	24	0.50%	5.79%	6.45%
Total	201	311	372	100.00%	100.00%	100.00%

=== 2000 census ===
As of the census of 2000, there were 201 people, 88 households, and 60 families residing in the CDP. The population density was 70.1 people per square mile (27.0/km^{2}). There were 330 housing units at an average density of 115.0/sq mi (44.4/km^{2}). The racial makeup of the CDP was 93.03% White, 1.00% Asian, 1.00% Pacific Islander, and 4.98% from two or more races. Hispanic or Latino of any race were 0.50% of the population.

There were 88 households, out of which 23.9% had children under the age of 18 living with them, 61.4% were married couples living together, 2.3% had a female householder with no husband present, and 31.8% were non-families. 21.6% of all households were made up of individuals, and 2.3% had someone living alone who was 65 years of age or older. The average household size was 2.28 and the average family size was 2.68.

In the CDP, the population was spread out, with 18.9% under the age of 18, 6.0% from 18 to 24, 37.3% from 25 to 44, 29.9% from 45 to 64, and 8.0% who were 65 years of age or older. The median age was 40 years. For every 100 females, there were 109.4 males. For every 100 females age 18 and over, there were 111.7 males.

The median income for a household in the CDP was $81,883, and the median income for a family was $89,532. Males had a median income of $50,417 versus $26,875 for females. The per capita income for the CDP was $54,316. None of the families and 1.9% of the population were living below the poverty line.
