= List of shopping malls in Washington =

List of shopping malls in Washington may refer to:

- List of shopping malls in Washington (state)
- List of shopping malls in Washington, D.C.
