= Washington State Route 906 =

State highway in King and Kittitas counties, Washington, US

State Route 906
- SR 906 highlighted in red

Route information
- Auxiliary route of I-90
- Maintained by WSDOT
- Length: 2.65 mi (4.26 km)
- Existed: May 11, 1967–present

Major junctions
- West end: I-90 in Snoqualmie Pass
- East end: I-90 in Hyak

Location
- Country: United States
- State: Washington
- Counties: King, Kittitas

Highway system
- State highways in Washington; Interstate; US; State; Scenic; Pre-1964; 1964 renumbering; Former
← SR 904	→ SR 970

State Route 906 (SR 906) is a 2.65-mile-long (4.26 km) state highway in the U.S. state of Washington, serving Snoqualmie Pass and its associated ski areas in King and Kittitas counties. The highway travels southeast between two interchanges with Interstate 90 (I-90) in Snoqualmie Pass and Hyak. SR 906 was formed out of segments of the former Sunset Highway that were bypassed by the construction of the controlled-access Interstate Highway over the pass. Between 360 and 2,100 vehicles used the road on an average day in 2012.

== Route description ==
SR 906 begins at a half-diamond interchange with I-90, exit 52, in Snoqualmie Pass, King County. North of I-90, Summit Road provides access to the Alpental ski area. Only the first 3/10 mile (480 m) of the highway is in King County, with the remainder of the highway in Kittitas County. After crossing the county line, SR 906 is bounded by Summit West on the west side of the highway and the Snoqualmie Pass Traveler's Rest rest area on the east side. Access to the Pacific Crest Trail is provided from the one of Summit West's parking lots. Just south of the rest area is an intersection with Yellowstone Road, which links back to I-90 at a full diamond interchange. Yellowstone Road was once a part of the Yellowstone Trail, a cross-country auto-trail.

Summit Central borders the west side of the highway with parking lots for the ski area on the east side of the highway, as the two-lane 35-mile-per-hour (56 km/h) speed limited road enters the unincorporated community of Hyak and continues southeastward. The highway comes to a four-way intersection, and SR 906 turns to the north to meet I-90 at exit 54. SR 906 Spur, a 0.43-mile-long (690 m) spur route continues east through the intersection to serve the Washington State Department of Transportation (WSDOT) maintenance facility. Summit East is served by the roadway that continues south from the four-way intersection. A hybrid half-diamond interchange/partial cloverleaf serves as the eastern terminus of SR 906 as it reconnects to I-90. The roadway continues north past the interchange as Lake Mardee Road, named after the nearby lake of the same name.

Every year, WSDOT conducts a series of surveys on its highways in the state to measure traffic volume. This is expressed in terms of annual average daily traffic (AADT), which is a measure of traffic volume for any average day of the year. In 2012, WSDOT calculated that, on average, 360 vehicles used the highway near its eastern terminus, and as many as 2,100 vehicles used the highway just west of Yellowstone Road. Truck traffic was not reported between 2009 and 2012, and traffic counts have remained steady over the same period.

== History ==
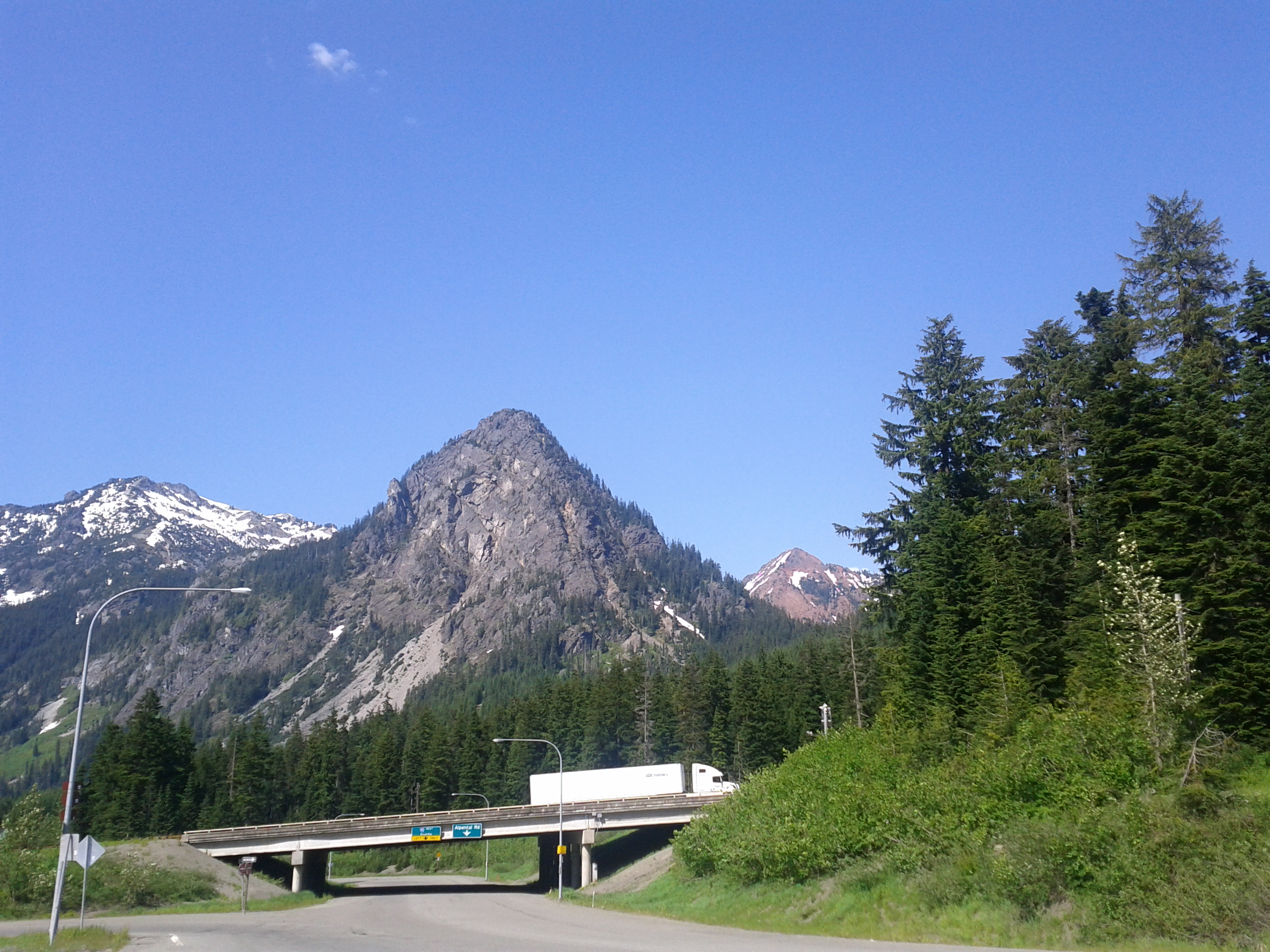
SR 906 at its western terminus, an interchange with I-90, in Snoqualmie Pass

Automobile roads over Snoqualmie Pass date back to 1905, when the first car traveled over the pass. A one-lane road was completed by 1909 to promote the Alaska–Yukon–Pacific Exposition in Seattle, complete with a race over the pass. The Sunset Highway was built as a two-lane road in 1915, and rebuilt along the abandoned right-of-way of the Chicago, Milwaukee, St. Paul and Pacific Railroad in 1926. The Sunset Highway was a part of the Yellowstone Trail, a transcontinental auto-trail. In 1926 the United States Numbered Highway System was established, and the highway over Snoqualmie Pass was designated U.S. Route 10 (US 10). The bridge that carries SR 906 over Hyak Creek was built in 1928. The road was first able to be kept open all winter by 1931, and in 1934 it was numbered Primary State Highway 2 in addition to US 10. The highway was paved between 1931 and 1939.

SR 906 came to be the name of the highway during the construction of Interstate 90 over the pass. Parts of US 10 were not up to the new Interstate Highway System standards, so a new limited-access highway was built, bypassing older alignments of roadway. The roadway now known as SR 906 was a bypassed section of the old Sunset Highway that was not up to Interstate Highway standards on May 11, 1967.

== Major intersections ==
County	Location	mi	km	Destinations	Notes
King	Snoqualmie Pass	0.00– 0.04	0.00– 0.064	I-90 west – Seattle	I-90 exit 52; western terminus, half-diamond interchange. Roadway continues as Alpental Road.
Kittitas	Hyak	0.47	0.76	Snoqualmie Summit Traveler's Rest	
Kittitas	Hyak	0.63	1.01	To I-90 (Yellowstone Road)	Former Yellowstone Trail
Kittitas	Hyak	2.55	4.10	SR 906 Spur east	Western terminus of SR 906 Spur
Kittitas	Hyak	2.59– 2.65	4.17– 4.26	I-90 – Seattle, Ellensburg	I-90 exit 54; eastern terminus, hybrid interchange. Roadway continues as Lake Mardee Road.
1.000 mi = 1.609 km; 1.000 km = 0.621 mi: Incomplete access

== Spur route ==
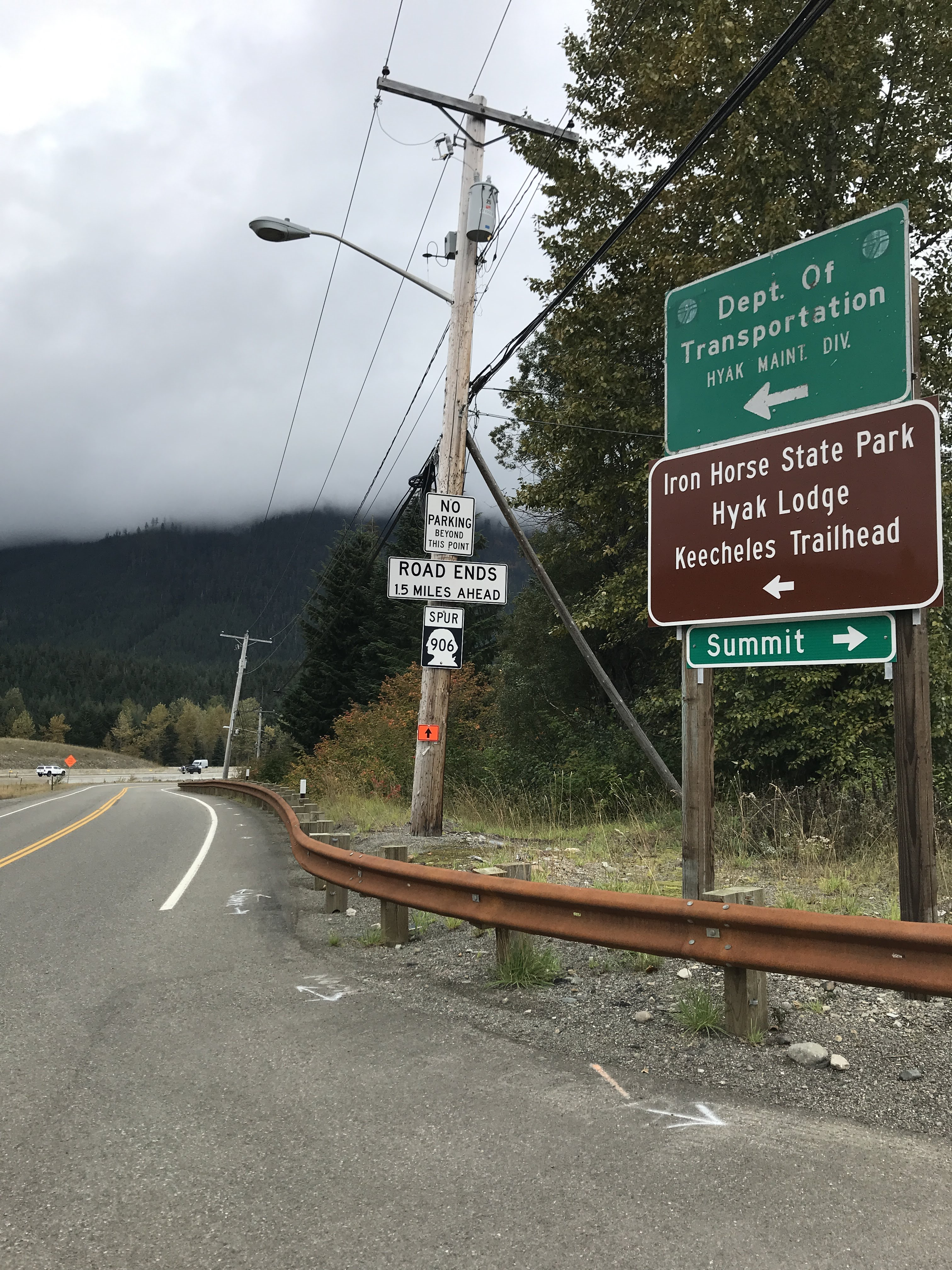
At the SR-906 spur's western terminus, facing east

State Route 906 Spur
- Location: Hyak, Washington
- Length: 0.43 mi (690 m)

State Route 906 Spur (SR 906 Spur) is a 0.43-mile-long (690 m) spur route located entirely within the unincorporated community of Hyak, Kittitas County. It branches from its parent just before SR 906's eastern terminus at I-90. The highway travels southeast, between I-90 and the Iron Horse Trail, and ends at a WSDOT maintenance facility located at the north end of Keechelus Lake. The old Chicago, Milwaukee, St. Paul & Pacific Railroad-Hyak Depot is accessible from SR 906 Spur, which now acts as a trail head for the Iron Horse rail trail. WSDOT conducts a series of surveys to measure traffic volume in terms of AADT and calculated that 300 vehicles-per-day used the spur route in 2012. This number has remained steady between 2009 and 2012.

=== Major intersections ===
The entire highway is in Hyak, Kittitas County.

mi	km	Destinations	Notes
0.00	0.00	SR 906 to I-90	Western terminus
0.43	0.69	WSDOT maintenance facility	Eastern terminus
1.000 mi = 1.609 km; 1.000 km = 0.621 mi
