= The Crescent (department store) =

Defunct American department store chain

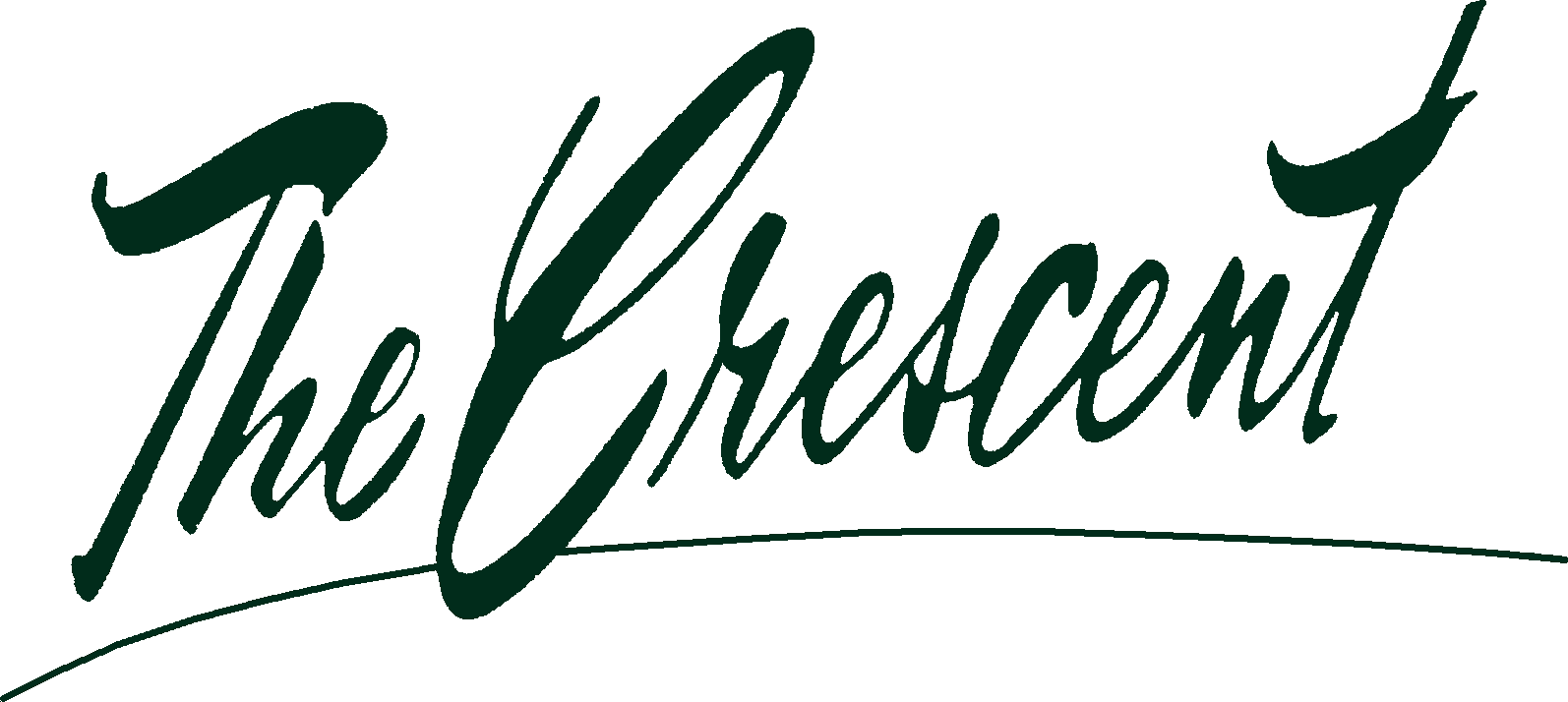
- Formerly: Spokane Dry Goods Company
- Company type: Department store
- Industry: Retail
- Founded: August 5, 1889; 136 years ago in Spokane, Washington
- Founders: Robert B. Paterson; James M. Comstock
- Defunct: 1988
- Fate: Store renamed Frederick & Nelson
- Headquarters: 707 W. Main Ave, Spokane, Washington, U.S.
- Products: Clothing, footwear, bedding, furniture, jewelry, beauty products, and housewares.

The Crescent was a small chain of department stores founded and based in Spokane, Washington. Once a subsidiary of Marshall Field & Company, the chain was sold to BATUS Retail Group in 1982. BATUS renamed the stores Frederick & Nelson, the company's Seattle, Washington division, in 1988. Frederick and Nelson eventually filed for bankruptcy and liquidated in 1992. At its peak, The Crescent operated seven department stores in Washington and Oregon, including three in Spokane.

== History ==
=== Beginnings ===
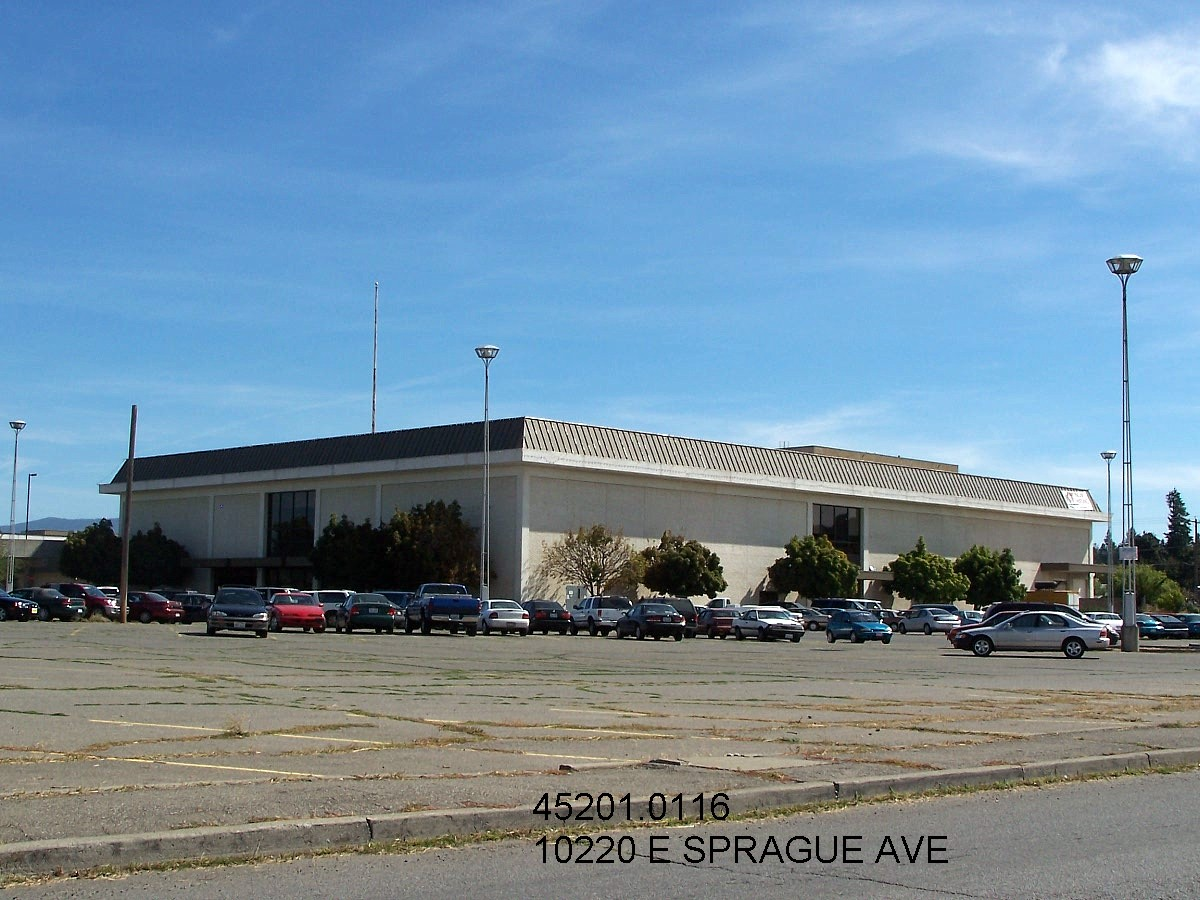
The former University City store, still vacant

The Crescent, originally the Spokane Dry Goods Company, was Spokane's leading department store for decades. The original Crescent was located on West Riverside Avenue next to the Spokesman-Review Building and opened for business on August 5, 1889, the day after the Great Fire destroyed most of downtown Spokane. As the town’s only remaining dry goods store, its entire stock sold out on the first day of business. Owners Robert B. Paterson and James M. Comstock supported the post-fire effort and did not raise prices in order to take advantage of the disaster, which began the tradition, “be fair to everyone.” Construction of the Crescent building, designed by noted Spokane architect Loren L. Rand, began in 1917 and continued to 1919. Originally five stories in height, the building was later expanded to seven. In 1949 the Crescent purchased the Alexander Building, adjacent to the south, so that it extended half a city block. The final expansion was made in 1973 to include the NW corner of the block.

=== Expansion ===
The first suburban Crescent store was built in 1959 at Northtown Mall, Spokane's first regional shopping center. Marshall Field & Company, the Chicago store that had owned Seattle's Frederick & Nelson since 1929, purchased The Crescent in 1962, and the company logo was changed to the Marshall Field's script. A second suburban Crescent was built in the Spokane Valley at University City shopping center in 1969.

In 1987, four of the six Frederick & Nelson locations in Oregon were sold to The Crescent. One location at Washington Square in Tigard remained as Frederick & Nelson and another in Salem was shut down. These four stores were sold to Lamonts in 1988.

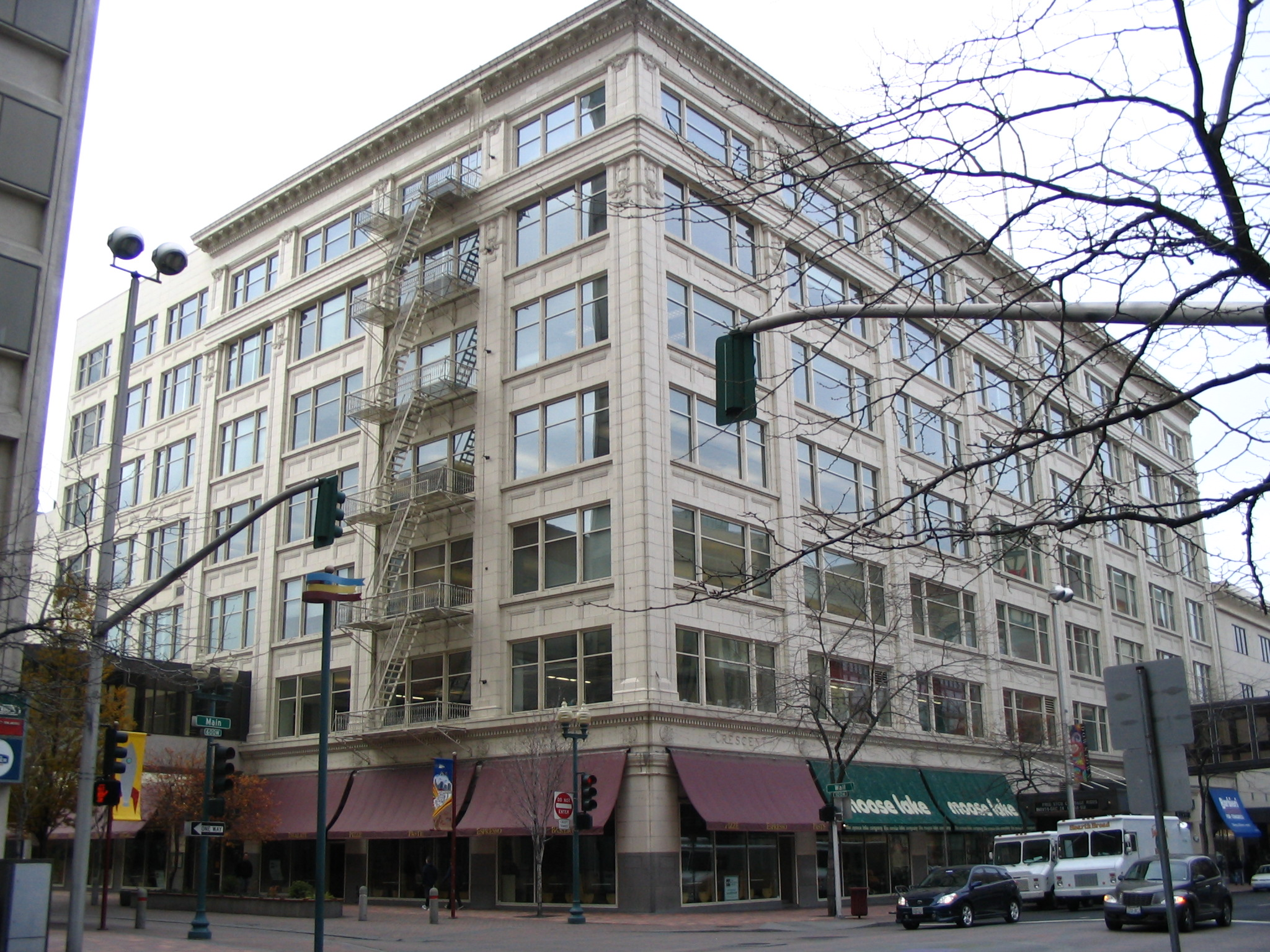
Downtown Spokane store

The Crescent, along with parent company Marshall Field's, was purchased by BATUS Retail Group in 1982. BATUS sold The Crescent and Frederick & Nelson in 1986, and the stores were renamed Frederick & Nelson in 1988, briefly, and closed in 1992. Its former store in Downtown Spokane on the southeast corner of Main and Wall is now known as Crescent Court, which houses retail stores and offices.
