= NorthTown Mall (Spokane, Washington) =

- Aerial view of the mall facilities and surrounding environment facing northeast from the corner of North Division St. and Wellesley Ave. Mount Spokane can be seen in the distance.
- Location: Spokane, Washington, U.S.
- Coordinates: 47°42′9.97″N 117°24′32.32″W
- Opened: 1955; 71 years ago
- Developer: H. Halvorson Inc.
- Manager: Kohan Retail Investment Group
- Owner: Kohan Retail Investment Group
- Num. of stores: 175
- Num. of anchor tenants: 8 (7 open, 1 vacant)
- Floor area: 1,048,908 sq ft (97,446.7 m^{2})
- Floors: 2 with partial basement (1 in Barnes & Noble, Marshalls, and Regal Cinemas, 3 in Macy's and parking garage)
- Parking: 4,500
- Public transit: Spokane Transit Authority
- Website: www.northtownmall.com

NorthTown Mall is a shopping mall located in Nevada Heights, Spokane, Washington, United States. The shopping mall first opened in 1955 as an open-air center and has been expanded several times, with its biggest expansion occurring between 1989 and 1991. The mall is currently anchored by Barnes & Noble, Ashley HomeStore, Get Air Trampoline Park, J. C. Penney, Kohl's, Marshalls, and Regal Cinemas.

== History ==
Planning for the shopping center began in early 1950 when Joe Albertson began discussing the possibility of opening an Albertsons supermarket on the site. Shortly after the store's opening in 1951, Albertson and his agent, E.D. McCarthy began planning a shopping center, and they secured options on more land. McCarthy named the proposed center Northtown and quickly received interest from Woolworth and W. T. Grant about opening large stores at the center. After convincing Travelers Life Insurance to commit to substantial loans, H. Halvorson Inc. began construction of Northtown and it was completed in 1955.

In June 1959, Sears confirmed plans to build a 208,000 square feet (19,300 m^{2}) department store at the shopping center. At the same time, Northtown officials revealed plans for a big remodel that would include a 30,000 square feet (2,800 m^{2}) expansion of the Albertsons store and 110,000 square feet (10,000 m^{2}) of new retail space. Sears completed its 13-acre site and opened in June 1961.

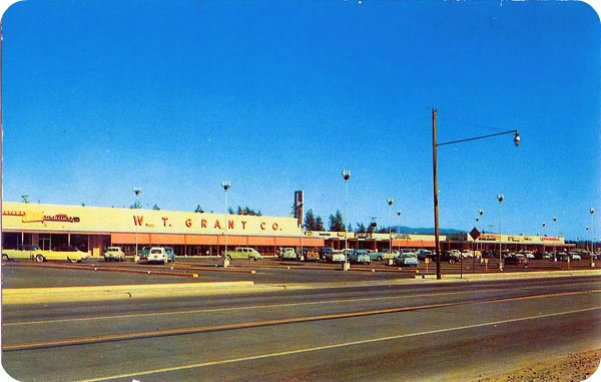
The W.T. Grant Co. store that existed at the mall from 1955 to 1975

Spokane-based The Crescent confirmed plans to open a 90,000 square feet (8,400 m^{2}) department store at the shopping center in December 1961. With 38 tenants ready for business, Northtown opened with a grand opening celebration on March 29, 1962. The Crescent opened its store at the shopping center in mid-July. After completion, Northtown featured 41 tenants and employed more than 1,300 people.

In 1976, W. T. Grant closed following a nationwide liquidation of the chain. The former W. T. Grant store was converted into the Northtown Mini-Mall, which featured several small retail shops.

In 1983, Northtown received a facelift and was converted to an enclosed shopping center. The project also added 17,000 square feet (1,600 m^{2}) of new space east of The Crescent store.

=== Major expansion in the 1990s ===
In August 1988, plans were announced to add a second level to the shopping center as part of $40 million expansion project. In February 1989, David Sabey, of the Sabey Corporation, officially revealed his plans for the major expansion project. Sabey's plans for the mall included four new department stores, a new Sears store, an additional parking garage, a food court, and dozens of new smaller shops. The plans also required several buildings to be demolished including the current Sears building and the Albertsons and PayLess Drug complex. At the time, Sabey would not reveal the names of the new department stores but chains including Emporium, JCPenney, and Mervyns were reportedly being considered. Sabey also stated that Frederick & Nelson (formerly The Crescent) would remain in the shopping center.

In preparation for the construction, Albertsons closed its store at the shopping center on August 3, 1989. One month later, Sears began liquidating its old store.

Plans to add The Bon Marché to center stalled in late 1989 after the chain's parent company filed for bankruptcy. In late 1990, Woolworth closed its store after failing to reach an agreement to relocate during construction at the mall. In August 1990, Mervyn's confirmed plans to open a store at the shopping mall. On November 7, 1990, JCPenney announced plans to close two of its three Spokane stores to open a store at NorthTown Mall. By early 1991, Emporium was added to the shopping center's plans and construction on the store began in April. On August 7, JCPenney was the first of the three new department stores to open. Emporium opened for business on October 17. The mall's formal grand opening was held on October 27.

=== Later additions ===
An addition including a Barnes & Noble, Nordstrom Rack and Regal Cinemas multiplex was completed in September 2000. It increased the gross leasable area of the shopping center to 1,050,000 square feet (98,000 m^{2}).

The Bon Marché was re-branded as Bon-Macy's in August 2003, and became a full-fledged Macy's in January 2005. Mervyns was closed in 2007 and replaced with Kohl's in late 2007. The Emporium, which closed in 2003, was replaced with a Steve & Barry's store in 2007 and was closed in 2009 when the chain was liquidated. Nordstrom Rack, which was relocated to Spokane Valley Mall (a shopping center owned by NorthTown owner General Growth Properties) in 2010, was replaced with a Marshalls store in March 2012.

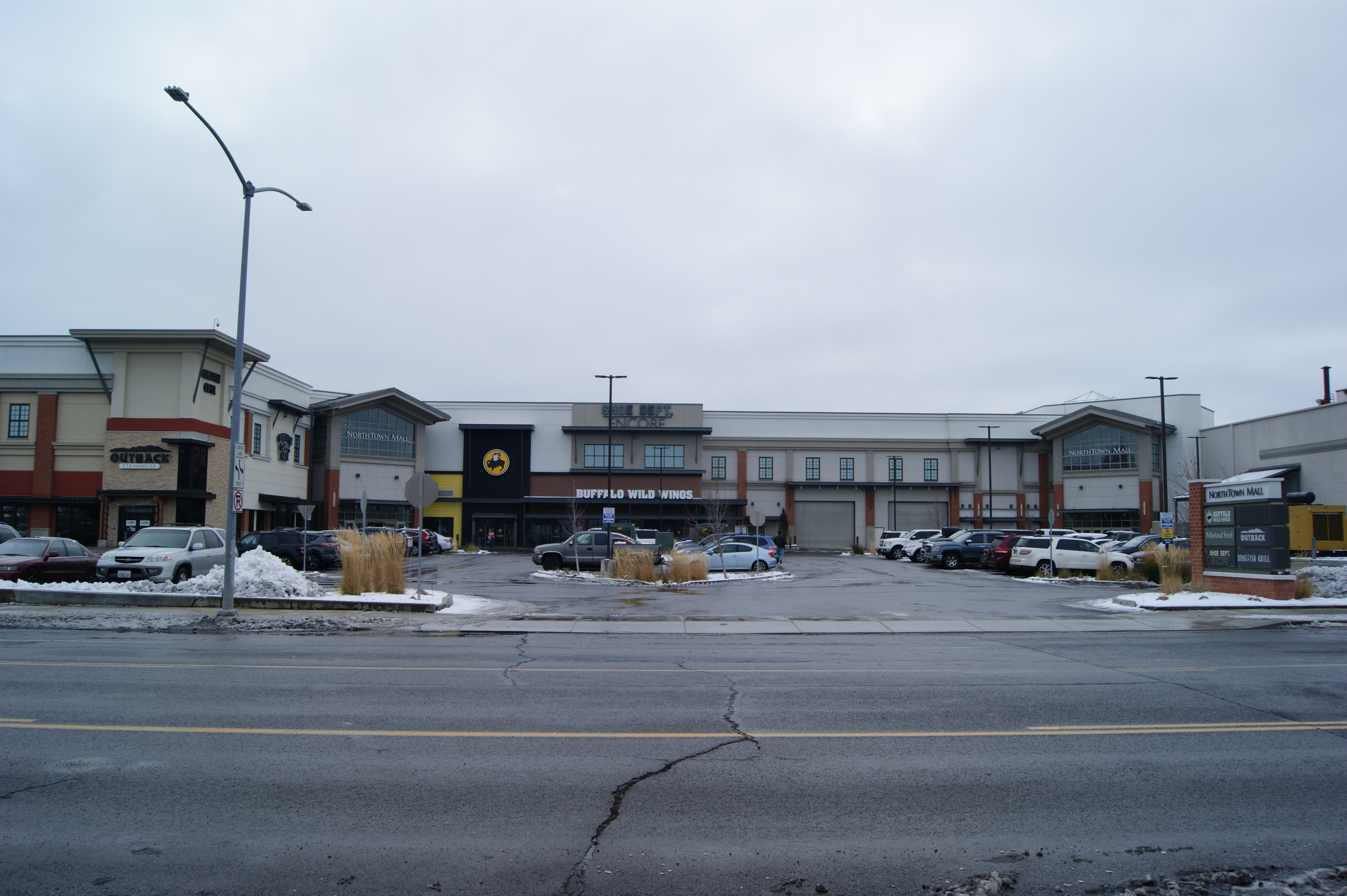
NorthTown Mall's renovated Queen Avenue entrance

In October 2013, the mall announced plans for a major renovation, which will include demolishing 120,000 square feet (11,000 m^{2}) of retail space in the mall's north end. When finished in 2015, the demolished portion was replaced with 63,000 square feet (5,900 m^{2}) of new retail space and a new entrance. The mall will also receive a reconfigured parking lot and new interior paint, lighting and signage.

The Blue Zoo, an 11,000 square foot interactive aquarium opened on August 1, 2019 in the renovated north portion of the mall; The zoo is marketed to provide an experiential environment to educate children about the oceans and features a variety of saltwater and freshwater marine life and includes tanks with starfish, shrimp and snails, reefs, giant octopus, and clownfish as well as a freshwater river tank and predator tank. Some tanks contain animals that can be touched, such as a pool where patrons can gently touch stingray and pick up cleaner shrimp; the zoo also has non marine life exhibits such as a reptile room and a bird room where you can feed parakeets and chickadees.

On August 6, 2019, Sears announced plans to close its store at the mall in late October as part of a plan to close 26 stores nationwide. On January 5, 2021, it was announced that Macy's would be closing in April 2021 as part of a plan to close 46 stores nationwide.

The mall was sold to the Kohan Retail Investment Group in February 2022 for $49 million.

In January 2026, Ashley HomeStore opened in the former Macy’s building after a year of construction. It is the company’s largest store, with over 101,000 square feet (9,400 m^{2}) and three stories.
