= Mountains to Sound Greenway =

Landscape in Washington state, U.S.

Coordinates: 47.41°N 121.38°W

The Mountains to Sound Greenway is a 1.5 million-acre landscape situated in Washington. On March 12, 2019, it was designated a National Heritage Area, to be managed by the Mountains to Sound Greenway Trust, as part of the John D. Dingell Jr. Conservation, Management, and Recreation Act. In 1998, it became the first National Scenic Byway to be designated in Washington.

The corridor stretches along Interstate 90 between Seattle and Ellensburg, following several historic transportation routes and a network of bicycling and hiking trails. Its formal boundaries are along several watersheds: the Yakima to the east, the Cedar to the south, Snoqualmie and Lake Washington to the north, and Puget Sound to the west.

The Greenway was first envisioned in 1990, when a group of citizens hiked from the Cascade Crest alongside Interstate 90. In 1991, the Mountains to Sound Greenway Trust was founded to prevent the encroachment of urban sprawl on the natural areas near Snoqualmie Pass and to use them to connect Seattle and Central Washington. Its creation has been criticized for attracting public funds that could have been used on other ecological protection projects.
