= Walla Walla Town Center =

Coordinates: 46.0559°N 118.3696°W

- Location: Walla Walla, Washington, U.S.
- Address: 1631 West Rose Street, Walla Walla, WA
- Opened: 1989 (original indoor mall)
- Closed: 2012 (original indoor mall)
- Owner: Zelman Development (2013); OREO Corp (2012); Meyer Properties
- Num. of stores: 18+
- Num. of anchor tenants: 4
- Floor area: 337,869 sq ft (31,389.1 m^{2})
- Floors: 1

Walla Walla Town Center, formerly Blue Mountain Mall is a shopping mall located in Walla Walla, Washington. It opened in 1989, and was considered the primary retail destination for Walla Walla and the surrounding area. The mall was demolished in 2017 to make way for the current shopping center. The name of the mall comes from the surrounding Blue Mountains. It featured a Shopko store as an anchor, with three anchors previously occupied by Sears, Troutman's Emporium (opened 1992 in a former Fred Meyer), and Gottschalks (originally JCPenney).

The mall was considered a dead mall in the 2000s as its inline tenants closed, although three of the anchors were still in operation as late as 2007. As of 2017, only Shopko and Carpet One remained at the location.

By 2012, the mall was bankrupt and closed, and sold on the courthouse steps on September 17 to OREO Corp for $4 Million in back taxes.

In late 2013, news reports circulated that the entire property had been purchased by a large mall property development group and would be renovated in time for the holiday shopping season of 2014.

In 2018, the center was reopened as Walla Walla Town Center. The Shopko from the original mall was retained, while many new tenants joined including Bed Bath & Beyond, Hobby Lobby, Ross Dress for Less, and Ulta Beauty.
