= Yellowstone Trail =

Transcontinental automobile highway

Yellowstone Trail

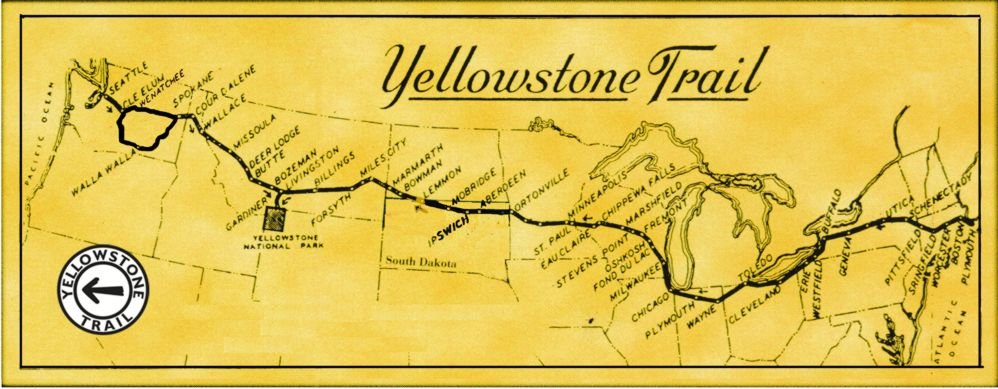

Route information
- Length: 3,719 mi (5,985 km) According to the 1920 Yellowstone Trail Route Guide.
- History: The Yellowstone Trail was established on May 23, 1912. The Yellowstone Trail Association was incorporated in 1918, and ceased in 1930.

Major junctions
- West end: Seattle, Washington
- East end: Plymouth, Massachusetts

Location
- Country: United States

Highway system
- Auto trails

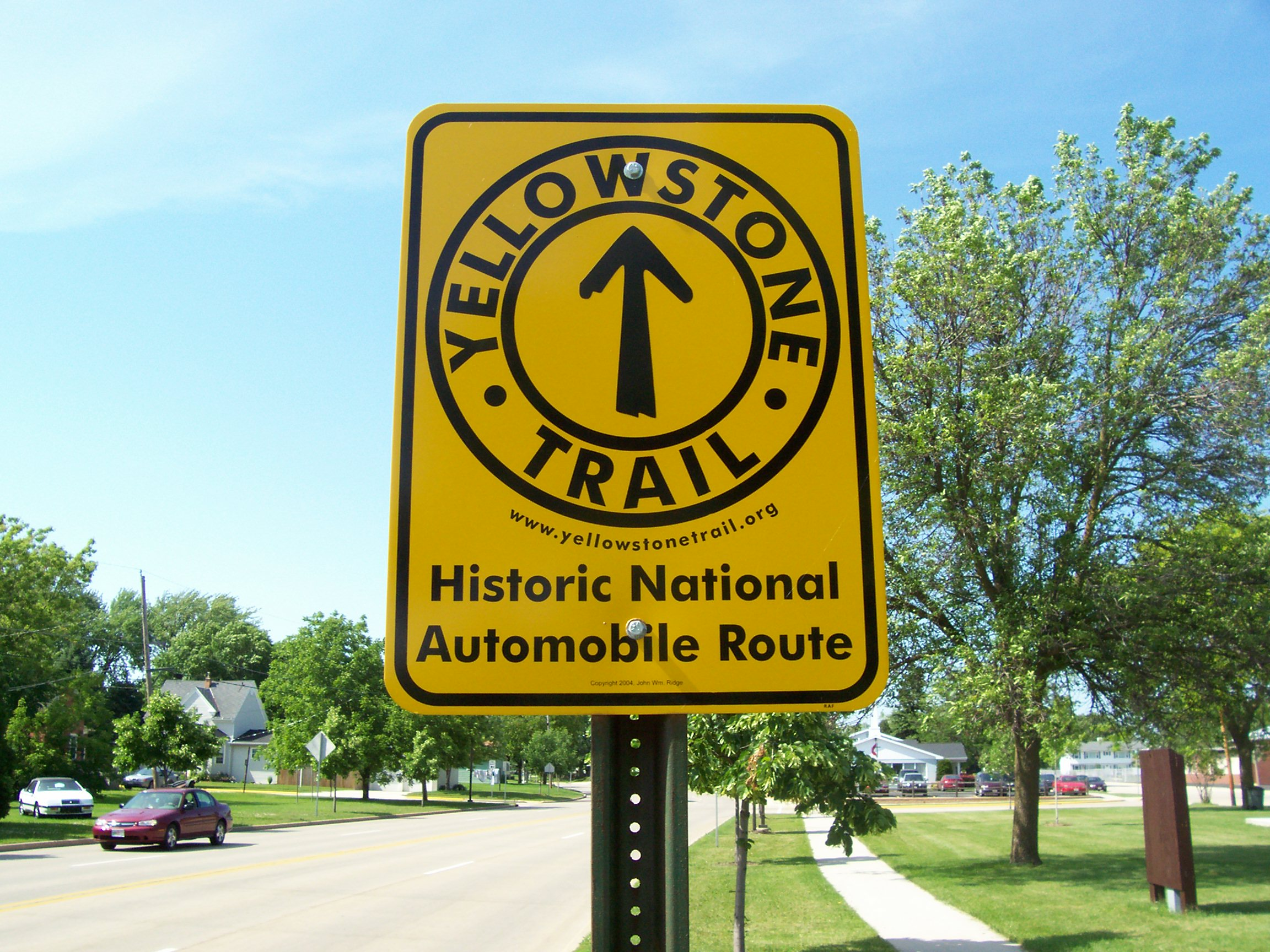
Route marker in Wisconsin

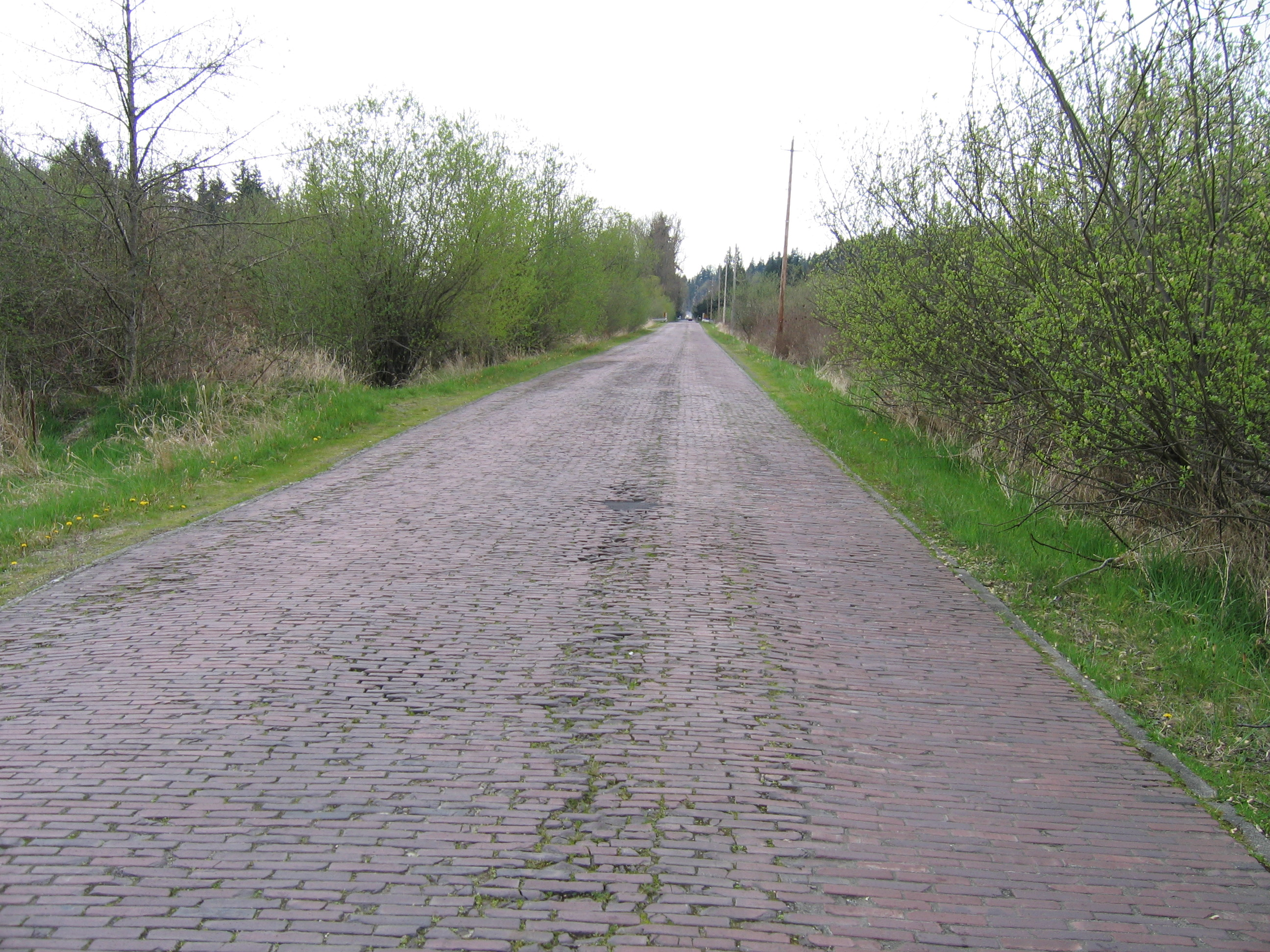
Original red brick section in Redmond, Washington

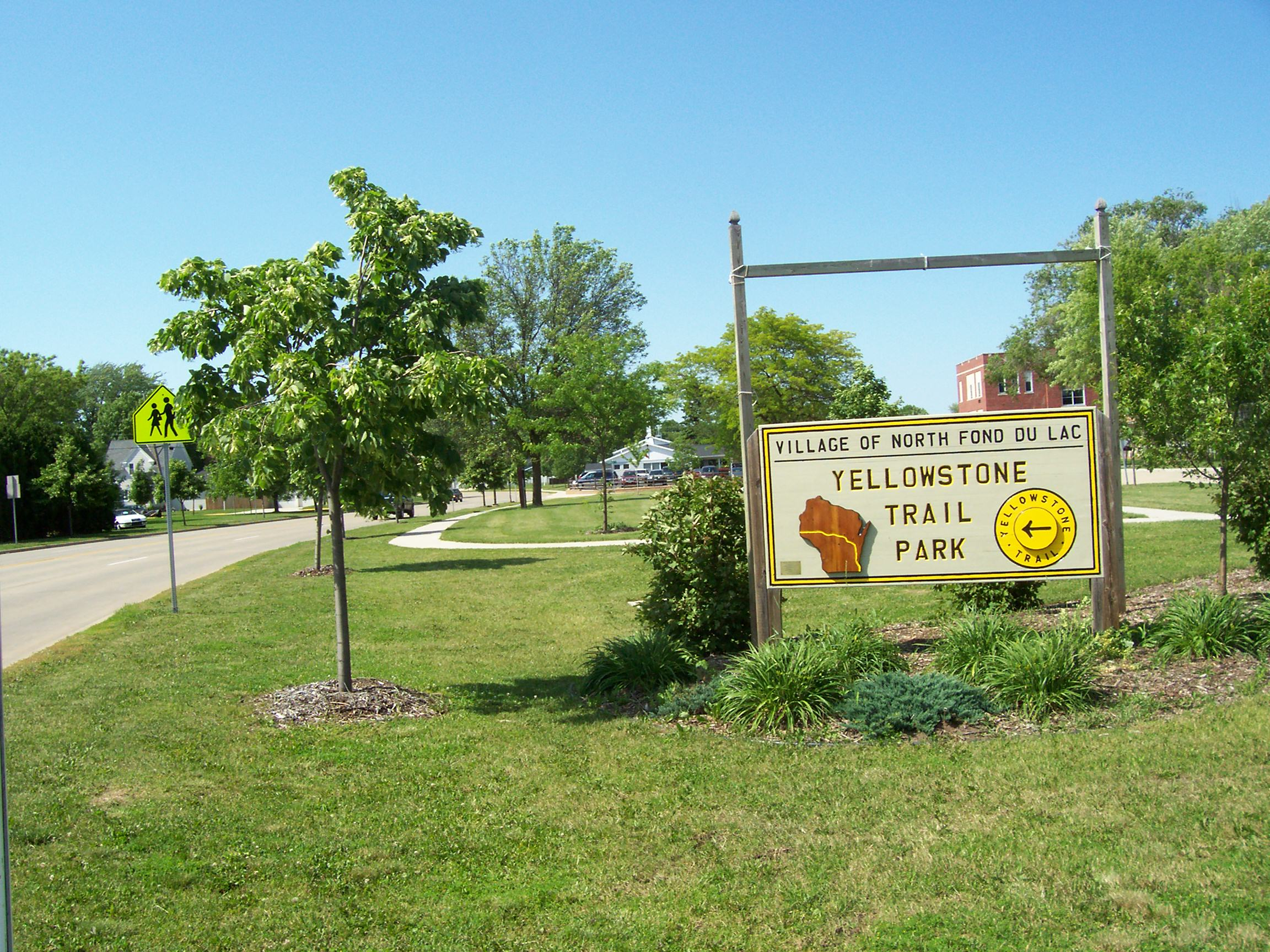
Yellowstone Trail Park's commemorative sign, in North Fond du Lac, Wisconsin

The Yellowstone Trail was the first transcontinental automobile highway through the upper tier of states in the United States, established on May 23, 1912. It was an Auto Trail that ran from the Atlantic Ocean in Plymouth, Massachusetts, through Montana to Yellowstone National Park in Wyoming, to the Pacific Ocean in Seattle, Washington. The road slogan was "A Good Road from Plymouth Rock to Puget Sound".

== History ==
The Yellowstone Trail was conceived by Joseph William Parmley of Ipswich, South Dakota. In April 1912, the first step he and his local influential colleagues wanted was a 25-mile-long (40 km) good road from Ipswich over to Aberdeen, also in South Dakota. By May, the intent had expanded to get a transcontinental route built, including to the popular tourist destination to the west, Yellowstone National Park.

The automobile was just becoming popular, but there were few good all weather roads, no useful long distance roads, and no government marked routes. The federal government had not built roads in the 19th century, except for the National Road (aka National Pike) from Washington, D.C. to Vandalia, Illinois. Many states had constitutions that forbade "internal improvements." The Yellowstone Trail developed in parallel with the nationwide effort for internal improvements, which included building and improving roads. Only the Yellowstone Trail, the Lincoln Highway, and the National Old Trails Road were transcontinental in length and notability, out of the 250 named Auto Trails of the era. In the early days of the Yellowstone Trail (generally before the advent of numeric signs and highway designations), the route was identified with yellow bands painted around trees and telephone poles, yellow arrows painted on barns, yellow painted rock piles, and so on.

=== Events ===
To commemorate the completion of the trail from Chicago to Seattle H.O. Cooley (secretary of the Yellowstone Trail Association) organized a relay from Chicago to Seattle. The relay consisted of twenty-one legs, and carried a letter from William Hale Thompson (mayor of Chicago) to Hiram Gill (mayor of Seattle). The first leg left the headquarters of the Chicago Automobile Club at noon on June 15, 1915. Some cars, such as the Cadillac Eight which drove from Butte to Missoula, Montana, were provided by dealers to show off their capacity. The Cadillac averaged 32.3 mph and supposedly arrived in Missoula almost two hours quicker than any previous attempt.

The eventual result of the relay is a matter of some contention. Many newspapers reported that the relay was successfully completed in 97 hours. What is certain is that George E. Dickson was in a car driving from Ellensburg to Seattle on the morning of June 19th and the vehicle skidded off the road near Redmond. Dickson was reportedly killed instantly, while two others sustained minor injuries. According to some reports in Seattle, the accident happened despite a decrease in speed because the relay was ahead of schedule, which disagrees with reports in New York that Dickson was attempting to beat the relay drivers from Coulee City to Seattle. Reports in Seattle also included that a different pair arrived from Coulee City with a message from that mayor.

The difference in reports likely arose from disagreement about the route of the trail. The official car was routed via Blewitt Pass, while an Ellensburg contingent argued for a route crossing the Columbia via a ferry at Vantage. Dickson's car was well ahead of the official car at the time of the accident, and had returned to the official route, which accounts for the reports that he had slowed.

Other accidents and incidents also happened. One was in Eau Claire, Wisconsin, when one of the competitors, George Murphy, was 'speeding recklessly' at 26 mph (42 km/h) in his Mitchell 6, en route to Menomonie from Chippewa Falls. He skidded when coming downhill around a corner, crashing into a tree. He survived, finishing his relay segment to Menomonie in a backup car.

== Yellowstone Trail Association ==
The Yellowstone Trail Association was incorporated in January 1918, with the head office in Minneapolis. It formed state chapters and smaller town chapters to oversee routing in the Midwest and West. Local "routing committee men" went out into their counties to find the best roads available, and talking the county governments into spending tax dollars on that route. They then persuaded small towns on the Trail to join the organization, paying a small fee to be included in the route's publicity materials.

The Yellowstone Trail Association also served information needs of travelers, much as the AAA—American Automobile Association had been doing for drivers in the United States. The Trail Association published maps and brochures, and established information bureaus in popular hotels and in tents along busy sections of the Trail, to hand out these materials. Travelers could telephone the Trail Association before planning a trip to see which roads were passable. The information bureaus also provided local information, much as Convention and Visitors Bureaus were to do in the present day.

As road systems in the United States matured, larger and larger portions of the Yellowstone Trail became the responsibility of governments. For example, in Wisconsin, much of the Yellowstone Trail was designated with State Highway 18 in 1919. State Highway 18 then became U.S. Route 10 through Wisconsin, with the creation of the United States Numbered Highway System in 1926. Changes like these made privately managed road trails like the Yellowstone Trail less relevant. Cities along their routes increasingly stopped paying dues to the Trail Association.

After the Great Depression began in 1929, the Yellowstone Trail and other named Auto Trails lost their allure and affordability. The main Yellowstone Trail Association office was closed on March 15, 1930. Its replacement organization, the Yellowstone Highway Association, operated marginally until around 1939.

=== Eastern United States ===
In the Eastern United States, the Yellowstone Trail Association exerted little influence on the road's routes. Instead it functioned primarily as a travel information bureau to entice tourists westward along the Trail.

== Present day ==
A few streets and roads retain the Yellowstone Trail name in the East, and some former sections remain as unimproved roads. In general, the original Yellowstone Trail garages and route signs are gone, though efforts to revive knowledge of the Trail in some sections of the country have been undergone in the 21st century for tourism reasons. Former sections, some with signage, still exist in travelable condition in Wisconsin, Montana, Idaho, and Washington.

== See also ==
- Good Roads Movement
- National Old Trails Road (1912)
- Lincoln Highway (1913)—first completed transcontinental Auto Trail
