= Spokane Valley Mall =

Coordinates: 47°40′24″N 117°12′25″W

- Aerial view of the mall looking east, 2022
- Location: Spokane Valley, Washington
- Opened: August 13, 1997; 29 years ago
- Developer: General Growth Properties
- Manager: GGP
- Owner: GGP
- Num. of stores: 120
- Num. of anchor tenants: 3 (2 open, 1 vacant)
- Floor area: 872,200
- Floors: 2
- Parking: Parking lot
- Public transit: Spokane Transit Authority
- Website: www.spokanevalleymall.com

Spokane Valley Mall is a shopping mall located at 14700 East Indiana Avenue in Spokane Valley, Washington, United States. It is about 9.5 miles away from NorthTown Mall in Spokane which is the largest mall in Eastern Washington. The current anchors are JCPenney and Macy's, and it includes a Regal Cinemas with 12 screens.

== History ==
The mall opened in 1997 featuring Sears, JCPenney, and The Bon Marche.

On November 7, 2019, it was announced that Sears would be closing this location a part of a plan to close 96 stores nationwide.

The store closed in February 2020.
