= U.S. Route 395 in Washington =

Highway in Washington

U.S. Route 395
- Thomas S. Foley Memorial Highway
- US 395 highlighted in red

Route information
- Auxiliary route of US 95
- Maintained by WSDOT
- Length: 277.11 mi (445.97 km)
- Existed: 1926–present
- Tourist routes: Lewis and Clark Trail

Major junctions
- South end: I-82 / US 395 at Oregon state line near Plymouth
- SR 240 in Kennewick; I-182 / US 12 in Pasco; SR 17 near Mesa; I-90 in Ritzville; I-90 / US 2 in Spokane; US 2 in Spokane; SR 20 in Colville; SR 25 in Kettle Falls
- North end: Highway 395 at the Canadian border in Laurier

Location
- Country: United States
- State: Washington
- Counties: Benton, Franklin, Adams, Lincoln, Spokane, Stevens, Ferry

Highway system
- United States Numbered Highway System; List; Special; Divided; State highways in Washington; Interstate; US; State; Scenic; Pre-1964; 1964 renumbering; Former
← SR 339	→ SR 397

U.S. Route 395 (US 395) is a United States Numbered Highway that runs from California to the inland regions of Oregon and Washington. It travels north–south through Washington, including long concurrencies with Interstate 82 (I-82) and I-90, and connects the Tri-Cities region to Spokane and the Canadian border at Laurier.

The non-concurrent sections of US 395 range form two-lane roads in northeastern Washington to a four-lane divided highway between Pasco and Ritzville. The highway generally travels along railroads built in the 19th century that were succeeded by early roads and auto trails. The Pasco–Ritzville section was upgraded to a divided highway in the 1990s and 2000s with funding from the state and federal governments.

The Spokane section of US 395, which is concurrent with US 2, is planned to be relocated to a new freeway bypass called the North Spokane Corridor. The freeway's first phase opened in 2009 and is scheduled to be completed in 2030. The entire highway was officially designated as the Thomas S. Foley Memorial Highway in 2018.

== Route description ==
US 395 is one of Washington's major north–south highways and is listed as part of the National Highway System, a network of roads identified as important to the national economy, defense, and mobility. The state legislature also designated it as a Highway of Statewide Significance. The highway is maintained by the Washington State Department of Transportation (WSDOT), which conducts an annual survey on state routes to measure traffic volume in terms of annual average daily traffic. Average 2016 traffic volumes on non-concurrent sections of the highway ranged from a minimum of 380 at the Laurier border crossing to 64,000 on the Blue Bridge between Kennewick and Pasco. US 395 is also a major international freight corridor, connecting the Inland Northwest to British Columbia and California. The Plymouth–Pasco section of the highway is signed as part of the Lewis and Clark Trail, a state scenic byway.

=== Tri-Cities to Ritzville ===
US 395 is concurrent with I-82 as it enters Washington on the Umatilla Bridge, a set of bridges that cross the Columbia River north of Umatilla, Oregon. The freeway carrying both highways travels north over the Fallbridge Subdivision of the BNSF Railway system and through an interchange with SR 14 east of Plymouth before traversing Fourmile Canyon. I-82 and US 395 turn north at Bofer Canyon and travel across irrigated farmland before crossing over the Horse Heaven Hills and intersecting SR 397. At its next exit in southwestern Kennewick, I-82 splits from US 395 in a trumpet interchange and heads northwest towards the Yakima River Valley. US 395 continues northeasterly into Kennewick, running as a four-lane divided highway with several signalized intersections.

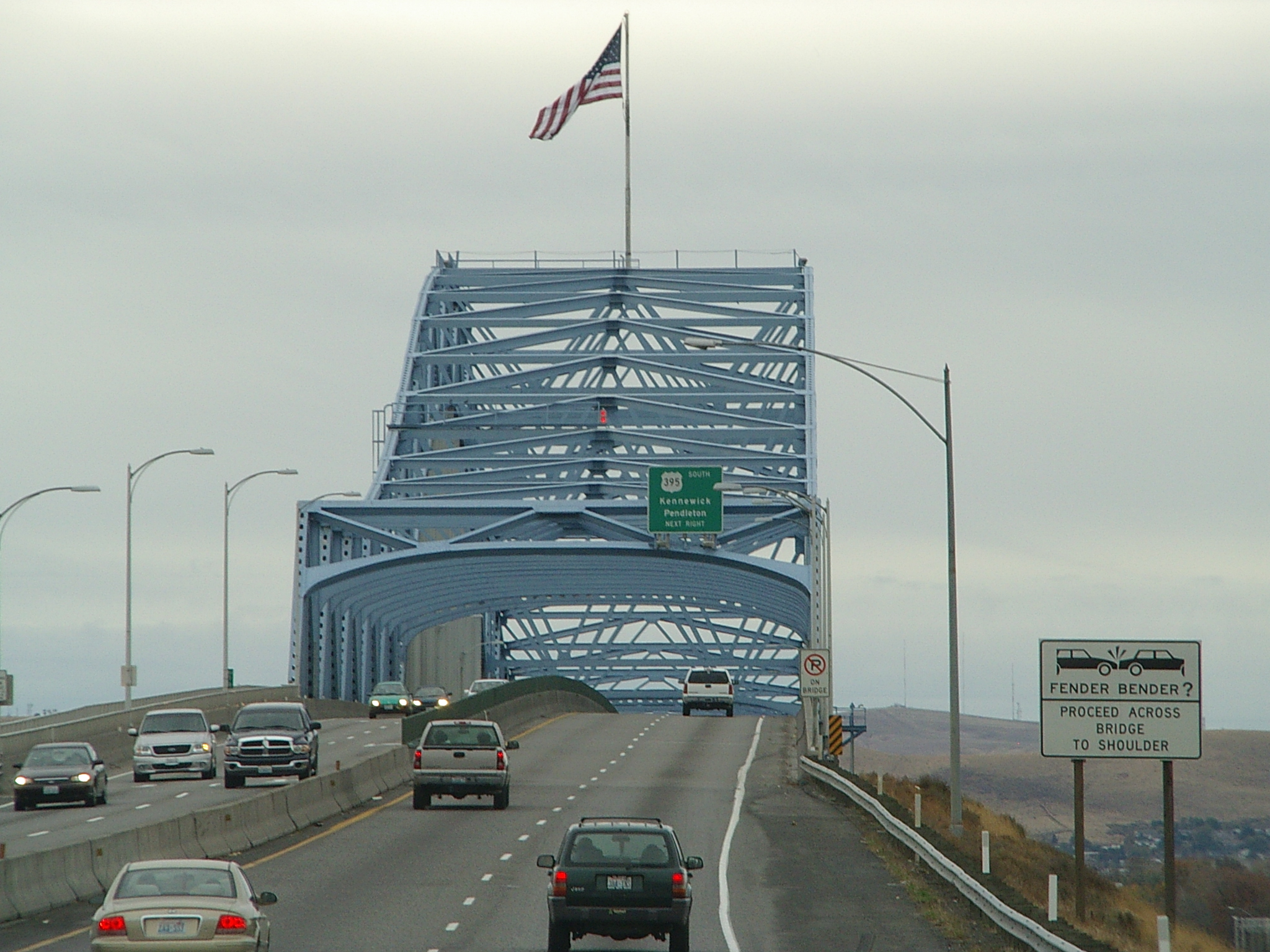
US 395 crosses the Columbia River between Kennewick and Pasco on the Blue Bridge, named for its blue trusses

The highway descends into suburban Kennewick, passing through retail areas and residential neighborhoods in the Southridge area. US 395 also passes the Southridge Sports Complex, which includes the city's 35-foot-tall (11 m) September 11 memorial, and the Southridge Hospital complex. The highway continues north onto Ely Street and turns east near the Zintel Creek before crossing over the BNSF Yakima Valley Subdivision and intersecting SR 240 in a dogbone interchange northwest of downtown Kennewick. SR 240 continues west as a freeway along the Columbia River towards Richland, while US 395 merges with the freeway's eastbound lanes and travels over the Columbia River on the Pioneer Memorial Bridge, a four-lane truss bridge that spans 2,521 feet (768 m) and is popularly known as the "Blue Bridge" because of the blue paint used on its trusses.

At the north end of the bridge, US 395 enters Pasco and becomes a short freeway, with interchanges at Lewis Street and Court Street. US 395 then turns east and joins the concurrent I-182 and US 12 for two miles (3.2 km). The freeway travels along the south side of Tri-Cities Airport and the Columbia Basin College campus and crosses over the BNSF Lakeside Subdivision near a major railyard. At a cloverleaf interchange with SR 397 in northeastern Pasco, US 395 splits from I-182 and travels north onto a divided highway that runs through an industrial area on the east side of the airport and railyard. The highway traverses an interchange at Kartchner Street before leaving Pasco, traveling northeast into the irrigated farmland of the Columbia Plateau along the BNSF Lakeside Subdivision, which also carries Amtrak's Empire Builder passenger trains. The divided highway travels through the area's farmland and rolling hills with un-signalized intersections at local roads and full interchanges at major state highways.

The railroad and highway follows the Esquatzel Coulee through Eltopia to an interchange southeast of Mesa that marks the south end of SR 17, a major highway serving central Washington. US 395 climbs the ridge overlooking the coulee and continues northeast to Connell, where it intersects SR 260. The highway travels north over the ridge and passes the Coyote Ridge Corrections Center, the state's largest prison by capacity, before entering Adams County. US 395 travels northeasterly into the Hatton Coulee and reaches an interchange with SR 26 east of Hatton. The highway's median widens while the northbound lanes take an uphill alignment through the north end of the coulee, rejoining the southbound lanes before an interchange with SR 21 east of Lind and its municipal airport. US 395 then travels northeast through an interchange in Paha before turning north and following the Paha Coulee to an interchange with I-90 in the southern outskirts of Ritzville. The eastbound lanes merge onto I-90, while other ramps connect US 395 to westbound I-90 and 1st Avenue, which continues into downtown Ritzville as I-90 Business.

=== Ritzville to Spokane ===
From Ritzville, US 395 runs concurrently with I-90 as the freeway travels northeast through a predominately rural area of Adams and Lincoln counties while following the BNSF Lakeside Subdivision. The freeway runs along the northwestern side of Sprague Lake and intersects SR 23 in Sprague before reaching Spokane County. I-90 and US 395 then intersect SR 902 and SR 904, which form loops that connect the highways to Medical Lake and Cheney, respectively. The freeway travels along the southeast side of Spokane International Airport before intersecting US 2, which joins the I-90 and US 395 concurrency as it enters the city of Spokane.

The freeway descends from Sunset Hill and intersects US 195 before entering Downtown Spokane on an elevated freeway. US 2 and US 395 split from I-90 at the east end of downtown, traveling on the one-way pair of Browne and Division streets. The two streets pass under a railroad viaduct adjacent to the Spokane Intermodal Center (the city's Amtrak station) and merge onto the bi-directional Division Street near the Spokane Convention Center and Washington State University Spokane campus. The highway then crosses over the Spokane River on the six-lane Division Street Bridge, splitting again on the north side of the river on Division and Ruby streets, carrying southbound and northbound traffic respectively.

Division and Ruby streets travel north and pass the campus of Gonzaga University before merging onto the bi-directional Division Street near Corbin Park. The seven-lane highway continues north along a commercial strip surrounded by Spokane's residential neighborhoods and passes the NorthTown Mall before reaching an intersection with SR 291 at Francis Avenue. US 2 splits from Division Street in the community of Country Homes, while US 395 continues north past the Whitworth University campus to Fairwood. Near the Wandermere Golf Course, US 395 joins the North Spokane Corridor freeway (signed as Future US 395) and travels across the Little Spokane River as a four-lane divided highway. The divided highway continues for several miles until reaching Hamann Corner on the Half Moon Prairie, which marks the northern extent of Spokane's contiguous suburbs.

=== Stevens and Ferry counties ===
The two-lane, undivided highway carrying US 395 continues northwest along the BNSF Kettle Falls Subdivision and passes Deer Park before entering Stevens County. After briefly turning due west in Clayton, US 395 climbs the foothills of the Selkirk Mountains and travels along the east side of Loon Lake before reaching a roundabout with SR 292 at the community of the same name. The highway leaves the railroad and continues northwest past Deer Lake and several quarries before reaching an intersection with SR 231 on the Colville River. US 395 continues north through the river valley, rejoining the railroad, and travels through the center of Chewelah before turning northwest. The highway and the Kettle Falls International Railway travel along the east side of the river valley and pass through the communities of Addy, Arden, and Orin near a section of the Colville National Forest.

US 395 reaches Colville and traverses the city as Main Street, passing through a roundabout at the south end and the city's downtown. It begins a concurrency with SR 20 in downtown Colville, which continues as the highway turns northwest and travels through another roundabout at the north end of the city. US 395 and SR 20 continue northwest along the Colville River to the city of Kettle Falls, where it intersects SR 25. The highway travels northwest and crosses the Columbia River on the Kettle Falls Bridge, a steel cantilever bridge that spans 1,267 feet (386 m) and is located downriver from the former site of the eponymous falls. At the west end of the bridge in Ferry County, US 395 and the railroad splits from SR 20, which continues west across the Okanogan Highlands.

US 395 continues north along the western shore of Franklin D. Roosevelt Lake to Kamloops Island, where it leaves the Columbia River and follows the Kettle River. The highway and railroad travel along the west side of the Kettle River, which marks the east edge of the Kettle Range and Colville National Forest, and passes through the communities of Boyds, Barstow and Orient. US 395 terminates at the Laurier crossing of the Canadian border. The border crossing is located adjacent to Avey Field State Airport, which has a single runway that continues 500 feet (150 m) north across the border. The highway continues into British Columbia as British Columbia Highway 395, which travels 2.5 miles (4.0 km) to a junction with British Columbia Highway 3 near Cascade; the nearest major Canadian city is Grand Forks, located 14 miles (23 km) to the west.

== History ==
=== Oregon to Pasco ===
When US 395 was extended southwest from Spokane into Oregon in the 1930s, it followed existing U.S. Highways - US 730 and US 410 - between the state line and Pasco; it was not realigned to the more direct route via Kennewick until 1985. However, the road from Plymouth to Kennewick, cutting off a bend in the Columbia River, had existed (as a county road) since the early days of the state highway system, and was improved by the 1930s. The Washington State Legislature added the roadway to the state highway system in 1943 as part of a Maryhill-Kennewick branch of Primary State Highway 8. (The main route of PSH 8 turned northeast from Maryhill to Buena via US 97.)

The Kennewick portion was later upgraded to a limited-access road, with signalized intersections. The cloverleaf interchange with SR 240 was replaced by a roundabout with access ramps in 2009. The southernmost intersection, at Ridgeline Drive in Southridge, was replaced by an overpass that opened in October 2022. It was fully converted into an interchange in 2023 at a cost of $22.5 million.

=== Pasco to Spokane ===
As part of the state's first connected state highway system, the Washington State Legislature designated the Central Washington Highway between Pasco and Spokane in 1913. The State Highway Board selected a route closely paralleling the Northern Pacific Railway's Pasco Division over existing county roads. In 1923, by which time the entire road had been improved, the highway became State Road 11 (Primary State Highway 11 after 1937), but retained its name (which was changed to Columbia Basin Highway in 1929). By that time, several routing changes had been made, with the State Highway Board moving the highway east away from the rail line between Eltopia and Connell and between Connell and Lind, and changing the direct northeasterly route from Cheney to Spokane to a northerly route ending at the Sunset Highway (now US 2) near Airway Heights. In the 1930s, US 395 was extended southwest from Spokane along SR 11 to Pasco, where it continued southeast on US 410 (now US 12) and southwest on US 730 into Oregon, both branches of State Road 3. US 10 was moved south between Cle Elum and Spokane in 1940, overlapping US 395 northeast of Ritzville.

Near Spokane, the Geiger Boulevard cutoff was built in about 1945 as a wartime project, improving access to Geiger Field. This included an interchange with Sunset Highway at the Spokane end. This roadway, and the rest of US 395 between Ritzville and Pasco, was replaced by a freeway in the 1950s and 1960s, as part of the project to turn US 10 into Interstate 90. The first section to open was the bypass of Ritzville to Tokio in the late 1950s, and the final piece was between Tokio and Tyler in the late 1960s. When the bypass of Cheney opened on November 18, 1966, the old route became a short-lived Secondary State Highway 11H, always signed as State Route 904.

As the first phase of converting US 395 between Pasco and Ritzville into a limited-access highway, the Department of Highways constructed a new a two-lane alignment between Connell and east of Lind in the mid-1950s, bypassing Lind and Foulkes Roads northeast from Connell and Wahl Road south from Lind. Another relocation was built in about 1980, moving the highway alongside the rail line between Eltopia and Connell. The southernmost 7.5 miles (12 km) of SR 17, from Eltopia to Mesa, were absorbed into the realignment; SR 17's mileposts now begin at about 7.5. Proposals to add the Pasco–Ritzville corridor to the Interstate Highway System in the 1970s were rejected by the federal government.

By 1991, when the Intermodal Surface Transportation Efficiency Act designated US 395 between Reno, Nevada and Canada as a high priority corridor of the National Highway System, and earmarked $54.5 million for improvements in Washington, the portion between Pasco and Mesa had been four-laned. That year, the state began an $83 million project, including $10.4 million more from the federal government, to widen the remainder north to Ritzville from two to four lanes. Several interchanges were also added to the road, then one of the state's most dangerous highways. WSDOT formally opened the last piece, 15 miles (24 km) of new northbound lanes near Lind, on November 21, 1995, completing a four-lane cross section between the Tri-Cities and Spokane. The speed limit was subsequently raised from 55 to 70 miles per hour (90 to 115 km/h) in July 1996, based on road conditions and actual driving speed.

=== Spokane ===
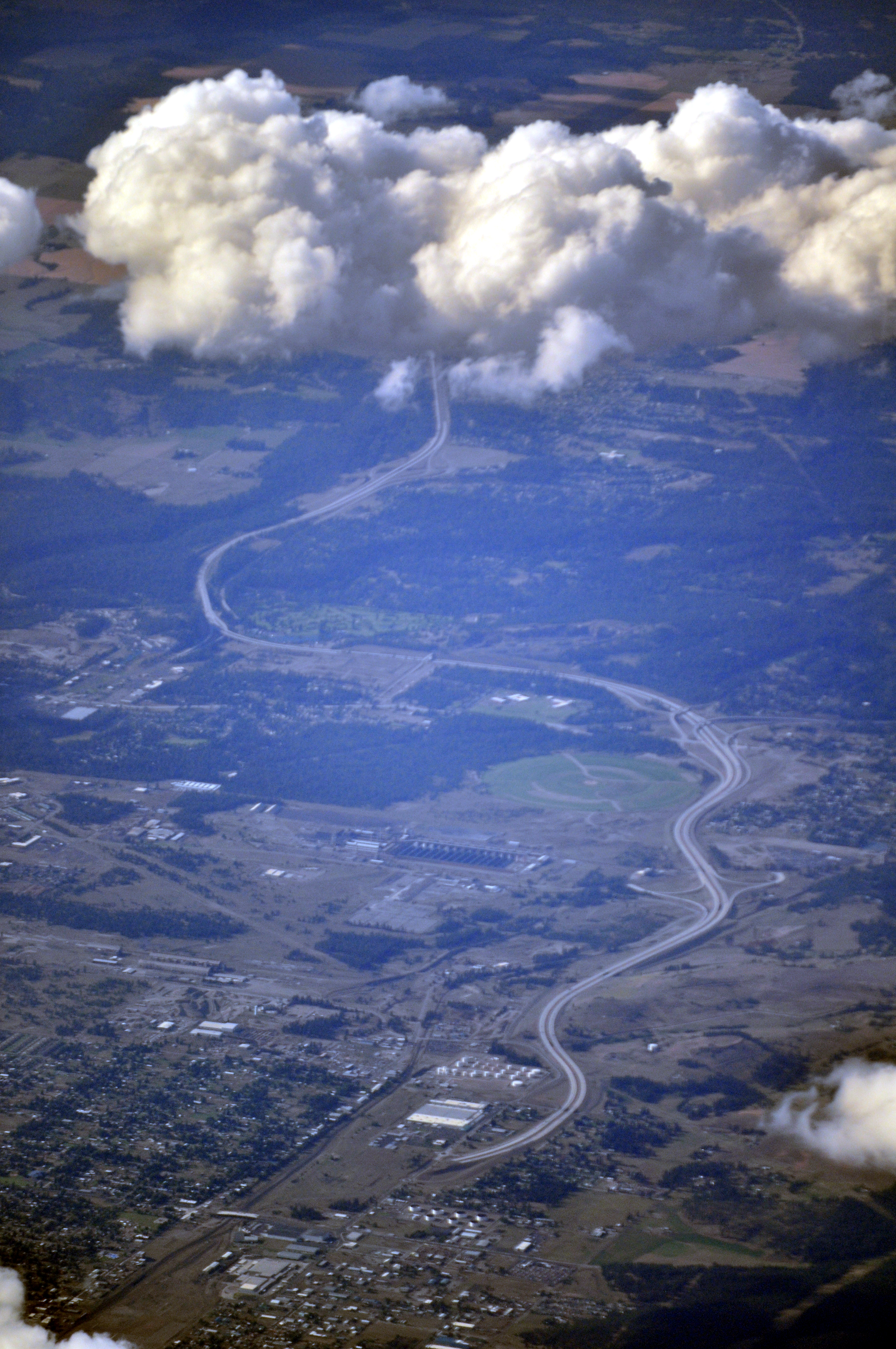
U.S. Route 395 north of Spokane (aerial photograph from slightly east of south; 2013)

Before the reconfiguration of 2nd and 3rd Avenues in 1951, the original routing of US 395 in Spokane ran northbound on Monroe Street for several miles, crossing the Monroe Street Bridge at Spokane Falls. After turning right onto Garland Avenue, the highway proceeded on North Wall Street, Waikiki Road, Mill Road, Dartford Drive (to late 1940s), and finally North Lane (which was turned into a private driveway years after being decommissioned) before merging with modern-day US 395 a few miles north of Spokane. From the late 1940s to late 1990s, US 395 used the bridge over the Little Spokane River at Wandermere. A new bridge was constructed about 250 feet to the west in anticipation of the North Spokane Corridor, while the old one became part of Wandermere Road. This is the second replacement bridge for US 395 over the Little Spokane River, each one built substantially higher above the water than the previous. (The Little Spokane is at the bottom of a river valley over 300 feet deep.)

The southern end of the highway was moved up to the intersection of Sprague and Monroe in 1930 while the entire highway was shifted east onto Division Street (US 2) in 1937. Sometime in the 1950s, the southbound lanes were relocated to Browne Street, which is immediately due south of the Spokane River.

US 395 through Spokane will be completely transformed by the North Spokane Corridor, an under-construction freeway which intends to address and alleviate a major chokepoint along the state highway system in metropolitan Spokane. The maximum speed limit along the entire route will be 60 miles per hour.

=== North to Canada ===
A major portion of the highway from the US 2 junction to Colville has been realigned and straightened over the years, including sections near Loon Lake, Chewelah, and Arden. The largest bypass was that of Loon Lake, which was built in 1959. Another bypass circumvented Old US 395 around Springdale. That highway eventually became SR 231 while its spur was officially dubbed SR 292. Further north near the town of Arden, a new highway section was built that paralleled the Old Arden Highway, which is now used mostly by local traffic. The last leg of US 395, from Colville to the Canada–United States border, has maintained almost exactly the same alignment since it was originally built. A pair of bridges linking Stevens County to Ferry County, known as the Kettle Falls Bridges, were constructed in 1941 in the vicinity of Kettle Falls over the Columbia River. After passing through some dense forest, the highway finally ends its journey at the Laurier-Cascade Border Crossing, where the highway transitions itself onto British Columbia Highway 395. In recent years, a number of changes have been made to address growing traffic issues; including (but not limited to) the addition of left-turn channelization at important intersections, a variety of different paving projects, the construction of two roundabouts in downtown Colville, a truck route that starts and ends at those roundabouts, and the addition of uphill passing lanes in some places.

In the early 1990s, the state government considered rerouting US 395 onto SR 25 in order to direct highway traffic towards Trail, British Columbia, but later abandoned the plan. The state also planned to build a bypass around Colville that was also abandoned.

=== Names and designations ===
In 2018, the state legislature passed a bill renaming all of US 395 in honor of Tom Foley, a U.S. Congressman and former Speaker of the House from Spokane. Foley played a part in securing federal funding for the expansion of US 395 into a four-lane divided highway between the Tri-Cities and Ritzville.

== Major intersections ==
County	Location	mi	km	Exit	Destinations	Notes
Columbia River		0.00	0.00		I-82 east / US 395 south	Continuation into Oregon
Columbia River		0.00	0.00	Umatilla Bridge		
Benton		1.00	1.61	131	SR 14 west / Lewis and Clark Trail – Plymouth, Vancouver	
Benton		9.84	15.84	122	Coffin Road	
Benton		18.19	29.27	114	Locust Grove Road (I-82 to SR 397 Intertie)	
Benton	Kennewick	19.83	31.91		I-82 west – Yakima	North end of I-82 overlap
Benton	Kennewick	20.54	33.06		Ridgeline Drive	
Benton	Kennewick	20.54	33.06	North end of freeway		
Benton	Kennewick	23.68	38.11		Kennewick Avenue – Kennewick City Center	
Benton	Kennewick	24.35	39.19	South end of freeway		
Benton	Kennewick	25.01	40.25		SR 240 west / Columbia Drive – Richland, Port of Kennewick	
Columbia River		25.69	41.34	Blue Bridge		
Franklin	Pasco	26.09	41.99		Lewis Street	Northbound exit and southbound entrance
Franklin	Pasco	26.27	42.28		Sylvester Street	Northbound exit only
Franklin	Pasco	26.80	43.13		Court Street	
Franklin	Pasco	27.35	44.02		I-182 west / US 12 west – Richland, Yakima	South end of I-182/US 12 overlap, exit 12A
Franklin	Pasco	27.79	44.72	12B	North 20th Avenue – Columbia Basin College	
Franklin	Pasco	28.87	46.46	13	North 4th Avenue – Pasco City Center	
Franklin	Pasco	29.48	47.44	14A	SR 397 south (Oregon Avenue) – Finley	
Franklin	Pasco	29.48	47.44		US 12 east / Lewis and Clark Trail – Walla Walla, Lewiston	North end of I-182/US 12 overlap, exit 14B
Franklin	Pasco	30.45	49.00		Kartchner Street / Hillsboro Street / Commercial Avenue	
Franklin	Pasco	31.87	51.29	North end of freeway		
Franklin		44.13	71.02		Eltopia West Road – Eltopia	
Franklin		44.13	71.02	South end of freeway		
Franklin	Mesa	52.65	84.73		SR 17 north – Mesa, Moses Lake	
Franklin	Connell	61.64	99.20		SR 260 – Connell, Kahlotus	
Franklin		63.22	101.74	North end of freeway		
Franklin		63.22	101.74			
Franklin		67.68	108.92	South end of freeway		
Adams		72.86	117.26		SR 26 – Colfax, Othello	
Adams		77.15	124.16	Gap in freeway		
Adams		88.70	142.75		SR 21 – Lind, Kahlotus	
Adams		94.10	151.44		Paha, Packard	
Adams		102.04	164.22		Ritzville	
Adams		102.69	165.26		I-90 west – Seattle	South end of I-90 overlap, exit 220; northbound exit is via Ritzville exit
Adams		103.87	167.16	221	SR 261 south – Ritzville, Washtucna	
Adams		108.34	174.36	226	Schoessler Road	
Adams		113.15	182.10	231	Tokio	
Lincoln	Sprague	127.18	204.68	245	SR 23 – Sprague, Harrington	
Lincoln		135.94	218.77	254	Fishtrap	
Spokane		139.61	224.68	257	SR 904 east – Tyler, Cheney	
Spokane		146.22	235.32	264	SR 902 east – Cheney, Medical Lake	
Spokane		152.47	245.38	270	SR 904 west – Four Lakes, Cheney	
Spokane		154.73	249.01	272	SR 902 west – Medical Lake	
Spokane		158.24	254.66	276	Geiger Boulevard / Grove Road	Former terminus of I-90 Bus.
Spokane		159.65	256.93	277B	US 2 west – Spokane Airport, Fairchild AFB, Davenport	South end of US 2 overlap; signed as exit 277 southbound
Spokane		160.12	257.69	277A	Garden Springs	Signed as exit 277 southbound; no entrance ramps
Spokane	Spokane	161.26	259.52	279	US 195 south – Colfax, Pullman	
Spokane	Spokane	162.08	260.84	280A	Maple Street	Signed as exit 280 northbound
Spokane	Spokane			280B	Lincoln Street	Northbound exit is via exit 280
Spokane	Spokane	163.24	262.71		I-90 east – Coeur d'Alene	North end of I-90 overlap, exit 281
Spokane	Spokane	163.77	263.56		Spokane Falls Boulevard	Former SR 290 east
Spokane	Spokane	167.59	269.71		SR 291 north – Suncrest	
Spokane	Spokane	169.27	272.41		US 2 east (Newport Highway) – Newport	North end of US 2 overlap
Spokane		171.78	276.45		Wandermere Road	
Spokane		171.78	276.45	South end of freeway		
Spokane		171.84	276.55		North Spokane Corridor	northbound entrance and southbound exit
Spokane		173.89	279.85		Hatch Road	
Spokane		175.89	283.07	North end of freeway		
Spokane		184.32	296.63		Main Avenue – Deer Park	
Stevens		195.37	314.42		SR 292 – Loon Lake, Springdale	
Stevens		203.31	327.20		Bulldog Creek Road – Valley, Waitts Lake	Former SR 232
Stevens		207.22	333.49		SR 231 – Valley, Springdale	
Stevens	Colville	234.41	377.25		SR 20 east – Ione, Newport	South end of SR 20 overlap
Stevens		243.91	392.54		SR 25 – Davenport, Northport, Trail	
Ferry		246.66	396.96		SR 20 west – Republic, Tonasket	North end of SR 20 overlap
Ferry		262.63	422.66		Boulder–Deer Creek Road – Curlew	
Ferry	Laurier	275.03	442.62	Highway 395 at the Canada–United States border		
1.000 mi = 1.609 km; 1.000 km = 0.621 mi: Concurrency terminus; Incomplete access

U.S. Route 395
Previous state: Oregon	Washington	Next state: Terminus
