= Addy, Washington =

Unincorporated community in Washington, United States

- Unincorporated community
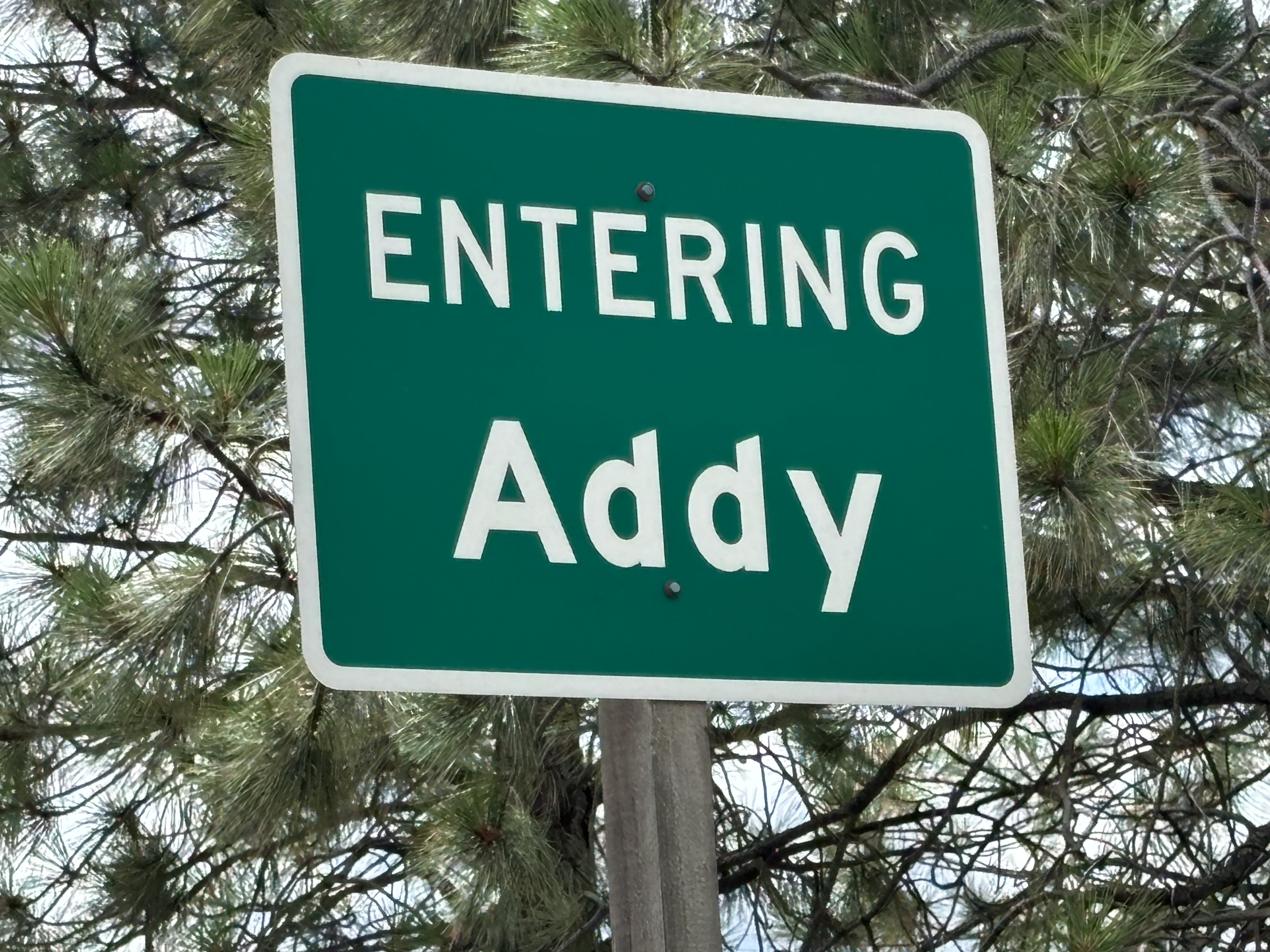
- Addy entering sign looking south from U.S. 395

- Location within Washington (state)
- Coordinates: 48°21′32″N 117°50′14″W
- Country: United States
- State: Washington
- County: Stevens
- Elevation: 1,641 ft (500 m)
- Time zone: UTC-8 (Pacific (PST))
  - Summer (DST): UTC-7 (PDT)
- ZIP code: 99101
- Area code: 509
- GNIS feature ID: 2586726

Addy is an unincorporated community and census-designated place in Stevens County, Washington, United States. It is located on the Colville River and U.S. Route 395 between Colville to the north and Chewelah to the south.

As of the 2020 census, Addy had a population of 210.

== History ==
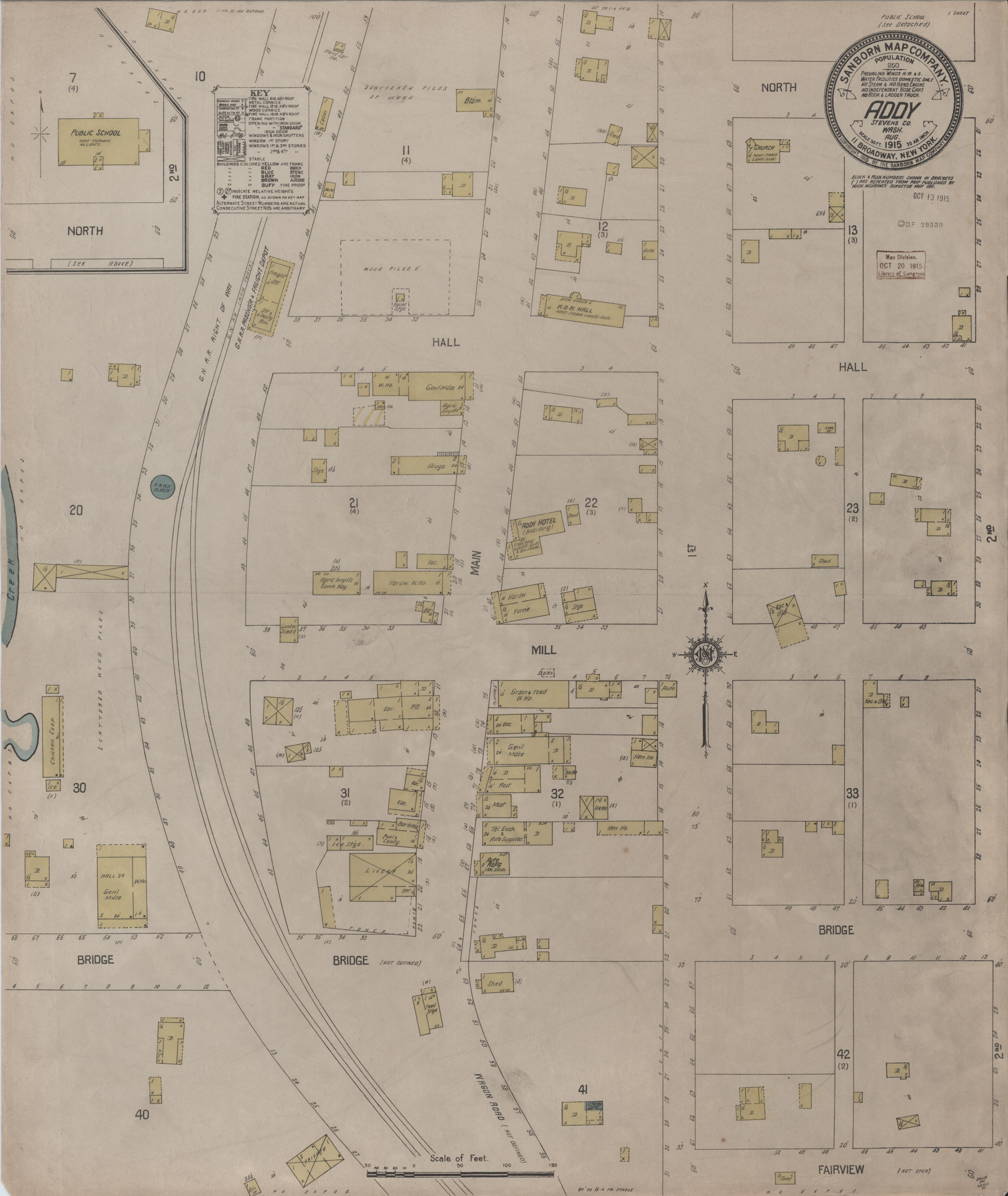
Map of Addy in 1915

Addy was first settled in 1851 by Magnus Flett, a Hudson's Bay Company (HBC) employee, after he retired to the Addy area. Thomas Stensgar retired from the Hudson's Bay Company in 1852 and obtained the first homestead in the area in 1867. Addy was originally a Swiss dairy community. Addy was named in 1890 by E. S. Dudrey, storekeeper and the town's first postmaster, for his wife Adeline, nicknamed Addy. Addy became the stop between Chewelah and Colville on the Spokane Falls and Northern Railway at the end of March 1892. Addy was platted by G. Fatzer in 1893. In 1975, Alcoa built a magnesium smelter, which became the largest employer in the county. In 2001, Alcoa closed the plant due to unfavorable market conditions. The first school was built in 1884 under Stevens County District 11. In 1967, the last Addy school was closed and students were bused to Chewelah. A small town alongside State Route 395, Addy was not tracked by the 2000 U.S. census, but in the 2010 census the population was 265. The town has one gas station, and a coffee shop. There is one restaurant in town, although several other businesses cater to the primarily agricultural local economy. Addy is assigned the ZIP code 99101.

== Climate ==
This climatic region is typified by large seasonal temperature differences, with warm to hot (and often humid) summers and cold (sometimes severely cold) winters. According to the Köppen Climate Classification system, Addy has a humid continental climate, abbreviated "Dfb" on climate maps.

== Demographics ==
Historical population
Census	Pop.	Note	%±
2010	268		—
2020	210		−21.6%
U.S. Decennial Census; 2000 2010

Addy first appeared as a census designated place in the 2010 U.S. census.

=== Racial and ethnic composition ===
Addy CDP, Washington – Racial and ethnic composition Note: the US Census treats Hispanic/Latino as an ethnic category. This table excludes Latinos from the racial categories and assigns them to a separate category. Hispanics/Latinos may be of any race.
Race / Ethnicity (NH = Non-Hispanic)	Pop 2010	Pop 2020	% 2010	% 2020
White alone (NH)	222	174	82.84%	82.86%
Black or African American alone (NH)	1	0	0.37%	0.00%
Native American or Alaska Native alone (NH)	13	2	4.85%	0.95%
Asian alone (NH)	0	3	0.00%	1.43%
Native Hawaiian or Pacific Islander alone (NH)	0	0	0.00%	0.00%
Other race alone (NH)	0	0	0.00%	0.00%
Mixed race or Multiracial (NH)	24	26	8.96%	12.38%
Hispanic or Latino (any race)	8	5	2.99%	2.38%
Total	268	210	100.00%	100.00%
