= Deer Lake (Washington) =

- Location within Washington (state) Location within the United States
- Coordinates: 48°06′42″N 117°35′12″W
- Lake type: open lake
- Basin countries: United States
- Max. length: 1.46 mi (2.35 km)
- Max. width: 1.1 mi (1.8 km)
- Surface area: 1,146 acres (464 ha)
- Max. depth: 78 ft (24 m)
- Surface elevation: 2,482 feet (757 m)

Deer Lake is a lake in southeastern Stevens County in the U.S. state of Washington. The lake is part of the Colville River drainage basin in the southern Selkirk Mountains. It is approximately 12 miles southeast of Chewelah and 12 miles northwest of Deer Park. It is a popular destination for fishing, with a dozen species to catch, as well as watersports.

== Geography ==
Deer Lake covers 1,146 acres in a mountainous area of southeastern Stevens County. Highway 395 runs approximately two miles to the west, with access to the lake provided by Deer Lake Road. There is public access to the lake in the southwest corner at the outlet, at Washington Department of Fish and Wildlife facility. Otherwise, the shoreline is lined with private property.

== Wildlife ==
Deer Lake in Stevens County is home to many different species of wildlife. Most abundant in Deer Lake’s waters are many different types of fish. Many species of fish in Deer Lake are stocked annually by local hatcheries. Some of the species of fish you may find in Deer Lake include the yellow perch, rainbow trout, black crappie, smallmouth bass, pumpkinseed, and others. Other species often found in Stevens County include many different birds and mammals. Some of the species found wandering the lands and sky include the red-tailed hawk, bald eagle, and white-tailed deer.

== Fishing ==
The wide selection of fish and the legality of two-pole fishing in Deer Lake adds to its recreational appeal. On February 16th, 2024, the Washington Fish and Wildlife Commission held a web conference to discuss the restrictions regarding recreational fishing in Deer Lake. At this meeting, a motion was made that called for the open fishing season to become year-round instead of seasonal, and also called to add a limit of 5 to the amount of lake trout that can be caught in one day. This motion was unanimously passed.

== Water Quality ==
A water quality sampling was conducted on August 5th, 2024 in Deer Lake’s water. This study detected 0.304 parts per million of nitrate. This level is below the maximum contaminant level of 10 ppm (parts-per notation) and also within the State Reporting Level of 0.5 ppm. While this water was found to comply with water quality standards, there was still Nitrate contamination. These contaminants likely stemmed from runoff carrying fertilizer chemicals, septic tank leakage, and other natural erosion.
