= Marengo, Washington =

Marengo, Washington may refer to:

- Marengo, Adams County, Washington
- Marengo, Columbia County, Washington
