= Laurier–Cascade Border Crossing =

Border crossing between Canada and the United States

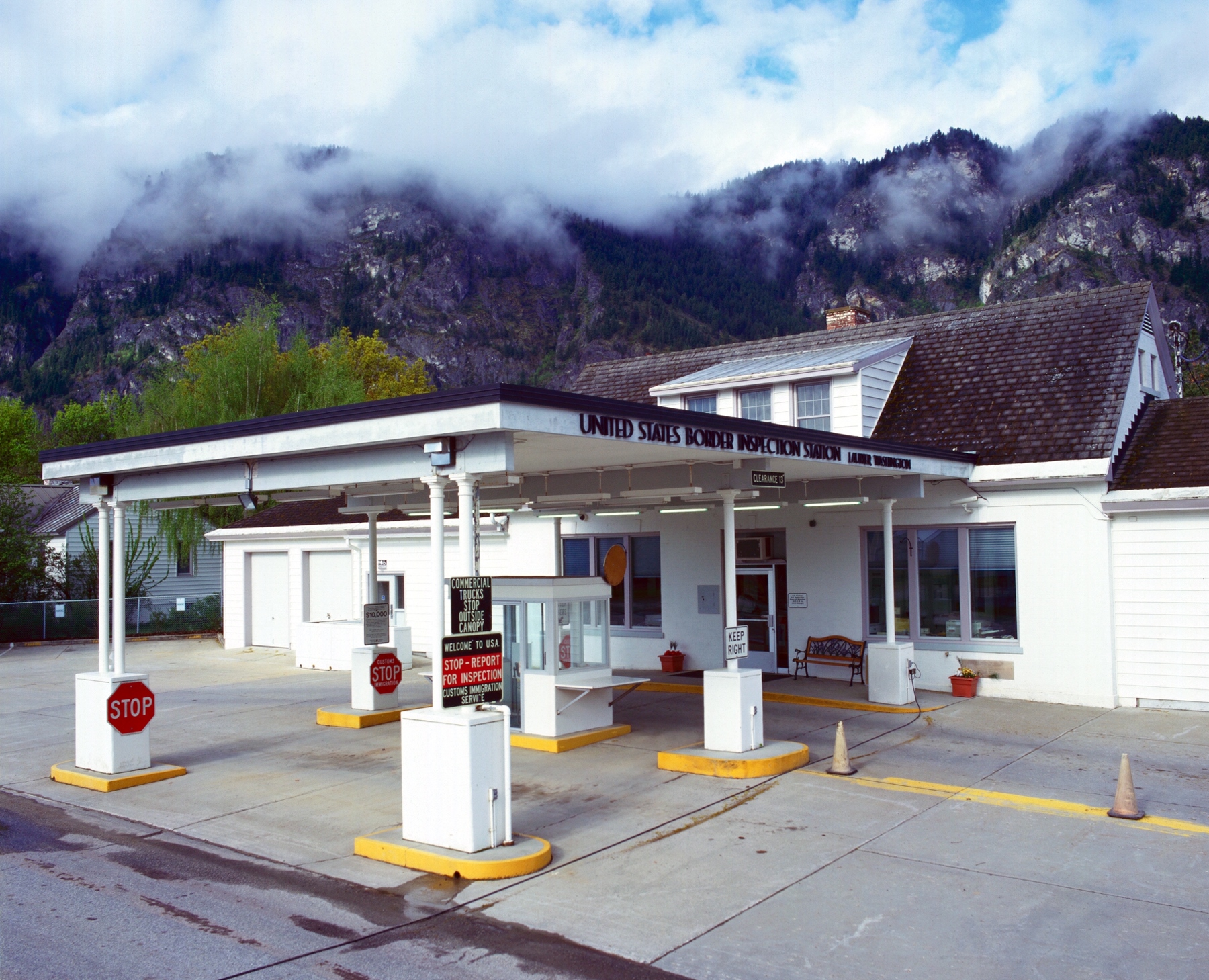
- US Border Inspection Station at Laurier, Washington

Location
- Country: United States; Canada
- Location: US 395 and Highway 395; US Port: U.S. Route 395, Laurier, WA 99146; Canadian Port: 102 Highway 395, South Christina Lake BC V0H 1E0
- Coordinates: 49°00′00″N 118°13′26″W

Details
- Opened: 1897

Website
- US Canadian
- U.S. Inspection Station – Laurier, Washington
- U.S. National Register of Historic Places
- MPS: U.S. Border Inspection Stations MPS
- NRHP reference No.: 14000612
- Added to NRHP: September 10, 2014

The Laurier–Cascade Border Crossing connects the town of Kettle Falls, Washington with Christina Lake, British Columbia on the Canada–US border. US Route 395 on the American side joins British Columbia Highway 395 on the Canadian side.

== Canadian side ==
In 1895, Cascade City was surveyed to form a townsite as a base for prospecting and a stop on the anticipated westward extension of the Columbia and Western Railway (C&W). By 1897, the mining boom was drawing numerous prospectors from south of the border. To address the consequences, a customs office opened that year in the town. In August 1899, the rail head of the C&W, a Canadian Pacific Railway subsidiary, reached the town. The same year, the customs office came under the administrative oversight of the Port of Grand Forks.

Under the Washington and Great Northern Railway (W&GN) charter, the Great Northern Railway (GN) laid track northward from Marcus (WA), reaching the border in March 1902. On completion of the ongoing track, Canada Customs applied seals to those freight cars entering at Carson and Cascade, which were purely transiting between these two points.

In 1932, new customs facilities were erected. In 1948, the government bought the site from the Cascade Development Company. That year, the status was upgraded to the Port of Cascade City and oversight of the Carson crossing was transferred from Nelson. For decades, Washington residents have used the crossing to reach their summer cottages at Christina Lake. Canada replaced the building in 2007.

In 2020, a stolen vehicle rammed through the closed crossing barriers in the early hours. The driver was later detected fleeing on foot. His attempt to evade capture by jumping into the Kettle River ended after a two and a half hour float chase.

The CBSA office is open 8am to 8pm.

== US side ==
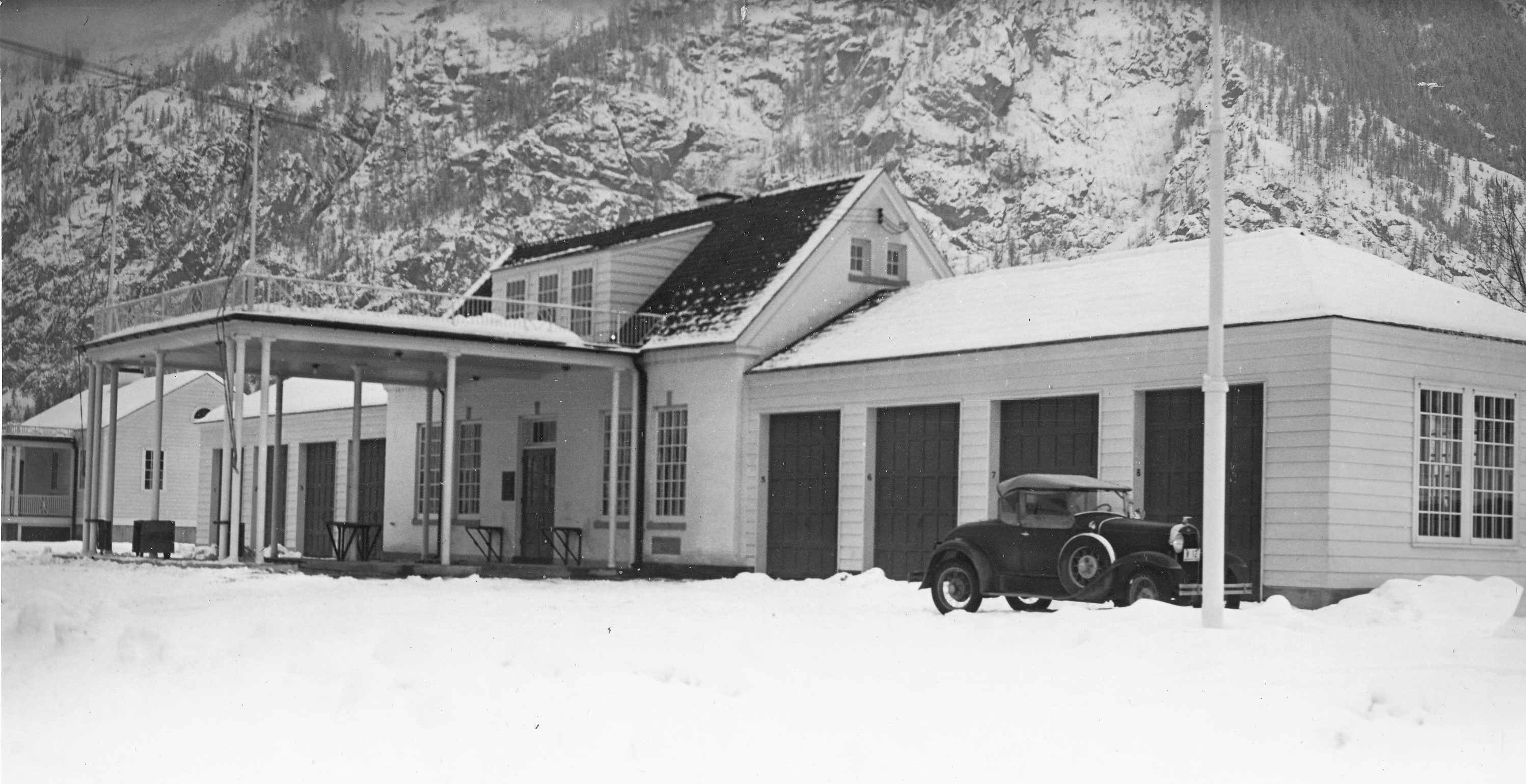
Laurier, WA border station, 1936

The crossing quickly became a popular smuggling route, especially for Chinese wishing to illegally enter the US.

The federal U.S. General Services Administration lists three buildings in Laurier, a border station and two border station residences, built in 1936.

The crossing operates 8am to midnight.

== Airport ==
The Avey Field State Airport runway/landing strip crosses the international border. Departing passengers use the customs and immigration facilities at the crossing, which is adjacent to the airport’s parking lot. In 2021, a small plane overshot the runway.

== See also ==
- List of Canada–United States border crossings
