= Orin, Washington =

Unincorporated community in Washington, United States

- Unincorporated community
- Location within Washington (state)
- Coordinates: 48°29′28″N 117°54′36″W
- Country: United States
- State: Washington
- County: Stevens
- Elevation: 1,568 ft (478 m)
- Time zone: UTC-8 (Pacific (PST))
  - Summer (DST): UTC-7 (PDT)
- ZIP code: 99114
- Area code: 509
- GNIS feature ID: 1524072

Orin is an unincorporated community in Stevens County, in the U.S. state of Washington. It is located on the Colville River. U.S. Route 395 passes through the community.

== History ==
A post office called Orin was established in 1902, and remained in operation until 1944. The community has the name of Orin S. Winslow.
