= Arden, Washington =

Unincorporated community in Washington, United States

- Unincorporated community
- Location within Washington (state)
- Coordinates: 48°27′37″N 117°52′33″W
- Country: United States
- State: Washington
- County: Stevens
- Elevation: 1,604 ft (489 m)
- Time zone: UTC-8 (Pacific (PST))
  - Summer (DST): UTC-7 (PDT)
- ZIP code: 99114
- Area code: 509
- GNIS feature ID: 1515942

Arden is an unincorporated community in Stevens County, Washington, United States.

Arden is located on U.S. Route 395 six miles south of Colville. It is served by Travel Washington's Gold Line, which runs between Spokane and Kettle Falls. The Little Pend Oreille River flows into the Colville River in the community. The Huckleberry Range of the Selkirk Mountains lie to the west of the community and the Iron Mountains are to the south.
