= British Columbia Highway 395 =

Highway in British Columbia

Highway 395
- A map of the Christina Lake area with Hwy 395 highlighted in red

Route information
- Maintained by the Ministry of Transportation and Infrastructure
- Length: 4.03 km (2.50 mi)
- Existed: 1973–present

Major junctions
- South end: US 395 at the U.S. border near Cascade
- North end: Highway 3 at Cascade

Location
- Country: Canada
- Province: British Columbia
- Regional districts: Kootenay Boundary

Highway system
- British Columbia provincial highways
← Highway 118	→ Highway 1

British Columbia Highway 395 is a short provincial highway in the Regional District of Kootenay Boundary of British Columbia. It is a cross-border spur that connects with U.S. Route 395 (from which it derives its number) at the Canada–U.S. border crossing near Laurier, Washington. Its northern terminus is at the Crowsnest Highway (Highway 3) near Cascade, about 20 km (12 mi) east of Grand Forks.

== Major intersections ==
The entire route is in Cascade, Kootenay Boundary Regional District.

km	mi	Destinations	Notes
0.00	0.00	US 395 south – Orient, Spokane	Continuation into Washington
0.00	0.00	Canada – United States border at Laurier-Cascade Border Crossing	
4.03	2.50	Highway 3 (Crowsnest Highway) – Grand Forks, Rock Creek, Christina Lake, Castlegar	Northern terminus
1.000 mi = 1.609 km; 1.000 km = 0.621 mi
