= Paha, Washington =

Unincorporated community in Washington, US

- Unincorporated community
- Location within Washington (state)
- Coordinates: 47°01′24″N 118°29′21″W
- Country: United States
- State: Washington
- County: Adams
- Elevation: 1,565 ft (477 m)
- Time zone: UTC-8 (Pacific (PST))
  - Summer (DST): UTC-7 (PDT)
- ZIP code: 99169
- Area code: 509
- GNIS feature ID: 1511212

Paha is an unincorporated community in Adams County, Washington, United States. It is located along BNSF Railway's Lakeside Subdivision. Paha is assigned the ZIP code 99169.

A post office called Paha was established in 1886, and remained in operation until 1943. The name Paha is Indian in origin.

== History ==
Prior to settlement by European Americans, the area that is now Paha was inhabited by Native Americans. The word "Paha" was their term for "big water" for the reliable spring nearby. The name was applied by settlers when the Northern Pacific Railway built a station there in 1883. Around that time, a townsite for Paha was platted by a George A. Miller, though his plat was vacated upon request of the railroad in 1887. In 1889, the town was replatted, this time by the railroad. An addition was platted in 1902 by Clark Long, a former probate judge and Commissioner of Adams County.

The town had a weekly newspaper called The Hub which began publication in 1901.

== Geography ==
Paha is located in Paha Coulee, a thin, steep valley running northeast-to-southwest. The flat bottom of the valley, which is only about a third-of-a-mile wide at Paha, sits at an elevation of 1,565 feet above sea level. The hills on either side rise over 300 feet within a mile of the town. Paha Cemetery is located atop the hill immediately north of town. Through the valley runs an intermittent stream along with a railroad track and U.S. Route 395. The highway has an exit allowing access to the community along Paha Packard Road. The city of Ritzville, the county seat, is located 10 miles northeast of Paha where Route 395 and Interstate 90 come together.
