= Cascade Falls (Kettle River) =

Waterfall in British Columbia, Canada

Coordinates: 49°01′00″N 118°13′00″W

Cascade Falls is a waterfall on the Kettle River in the Boundary Country of the Southern Interior of British Columbia. They are located just south of Christina Lake and just north of the Canada–United States border in a gorge 200-300 yards long and just below the railway bridge over the Kettle by the southern mainline of the Canadian Pacific Railway. The ghost town of Cascade City aka Cascade is nearby and was named for the falls, even though they were not officially named until 1977.

== See also ==
- List of waterfalls
- List of waterfalls in British Columbia
