= Adams County, Washington =

County in Washington, United States

- County
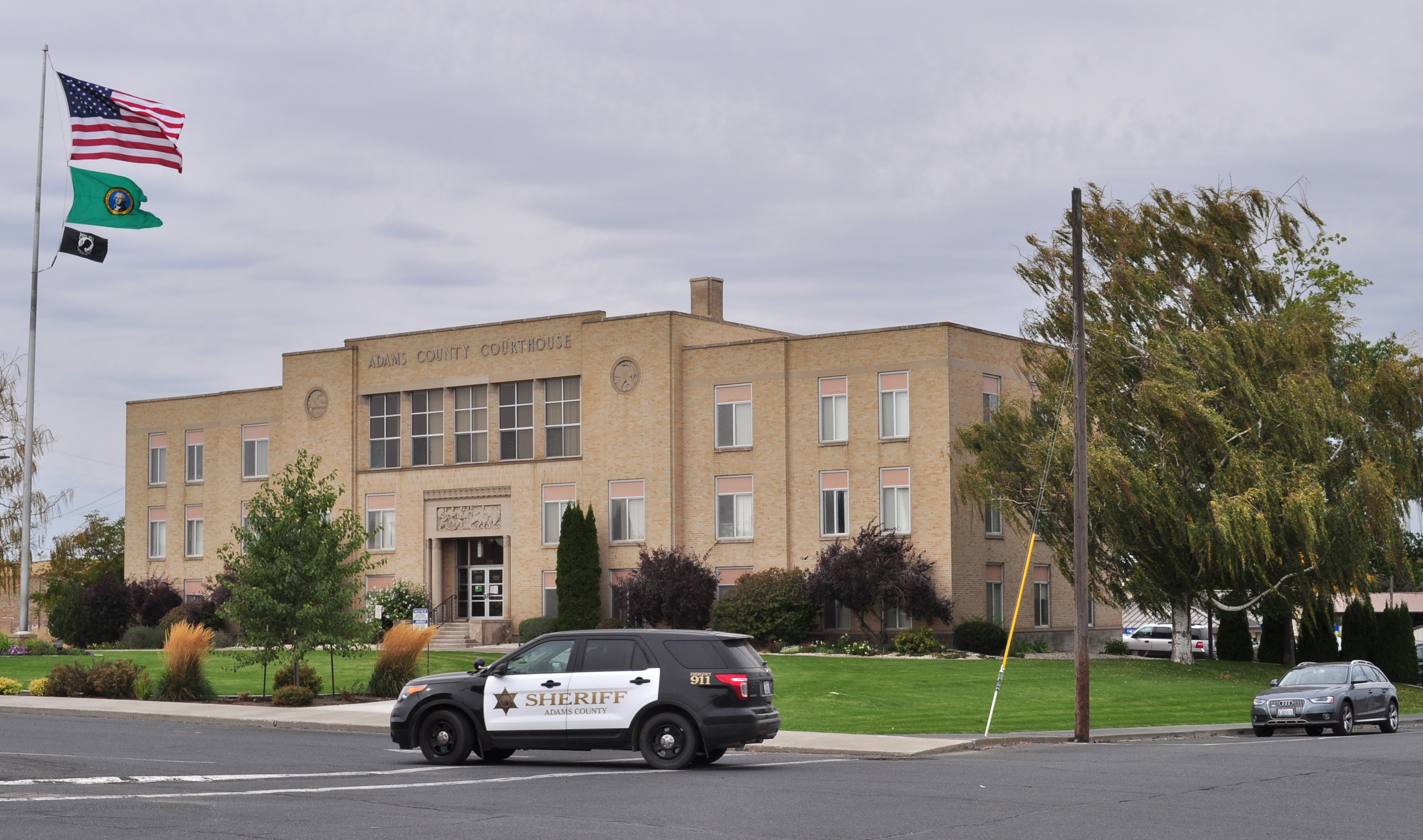
- Adams County Courthouse (erected 1941) in 2014

- Location within the U.S. state of Washington
- Coordinates: 47°00′40″N 118°30′46″W
- Country: United States
- State: Washington
- Founded: November 28, 1883
- Named for: John Adams
- Seat: Ritzville
- Largest city: Othello

Area
  - Total: 1,929.802 sq mi (4,998.16 km^{2})
  - Land: 1,924.989 sq mi (4,985.70 km^{2})
  - Water: 4.813 sq mi (12.47 km^{2}) 0.3%

Population (2020)
  - Total: 20,613
  - Estimate (2025): 21,488 ▲
  - Density: 11.2/sq mi (4.3/km^{2})
- Time zone: UTC−8 (Pacific)
  - Summer (DST): UTC−7 (PDT)
- Congressional districts: 4th, 5th
- Website: co.adams.wa.us

Adams County is a county in the U.S. state of Washington. As of the 2020 census, the population was 20,613. The county seat is Ritzville, and its largest city is Othello. The county was formed out of Whitman County in November 1883 and is named after John Adams, the second President of the United States. Adams County's two most populous cities are Ritzville and Othello. Ritzville is located in the northeastern corner of the county at the junction of I-90 and US 395, making it a popular stop for travelers. Ritzville is an hour's drive from Spokane. Othello is located in the southwestern panhandle of the county.

== History ==
=== Incorporation ===
The Governor of Washington Territory approved the proposed Adams County Articles of Incorporation on November 28, 1883. At that time Adams County and Franklin County were formed out of territory from Whitman County. The first County meeting (December 19, 1883) established Ritzville as the county seat.

By 1885, the county offices were established, in a wood-frame house purchased for the purpose in Ritzville.

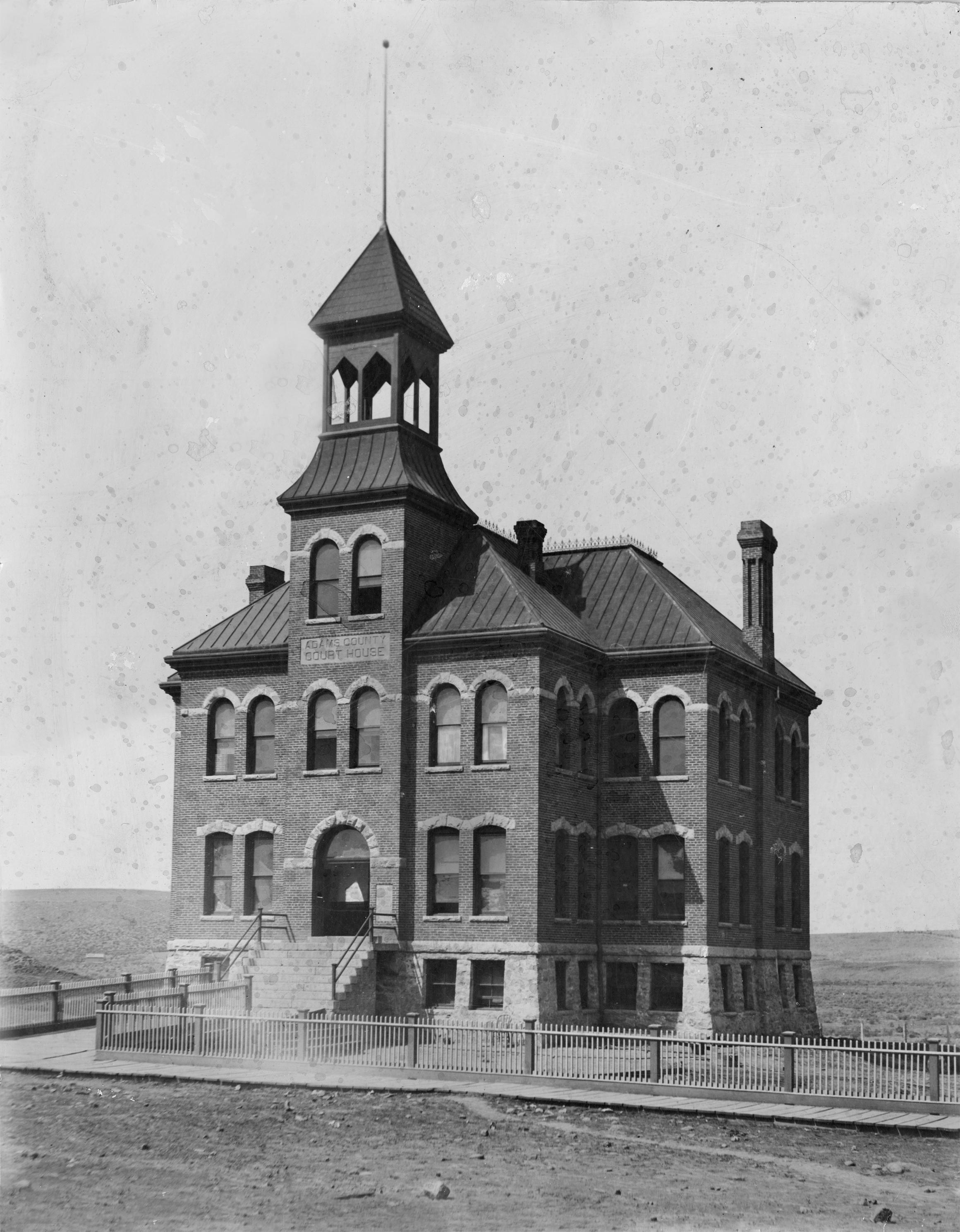
(Second) County Courthouse in Ritzville, completed on August 20, 1892.

The 1890 census showed that Adams County boasted 2,098 residents. The growing population justified a purpose-built courthouse, so construction began on a new brick courthouse on February 23, 1892.

=== 20th century ===
Wheat farming was a main focus of early residents. By 1904, Ritzville had become the largest initial shipping point for wheat in the United States; a 1909 pamphlet at the Alaska-Yukon-Pacific Exposition in Seattle read:

Adams County, Washington, the bread basket of the world. A land of wonderful resources where courage, intelligence, strenuous and persistent efforts of the hardy pioneer have wrested the hidden wealth from mother earth ... [a] golden wheat belt which has pushed its way steadily into the wilderness of sage brush which the pioneers found when they came. The gold has gradually absorbed the brown ... the history of Adams County is a song of wheat.

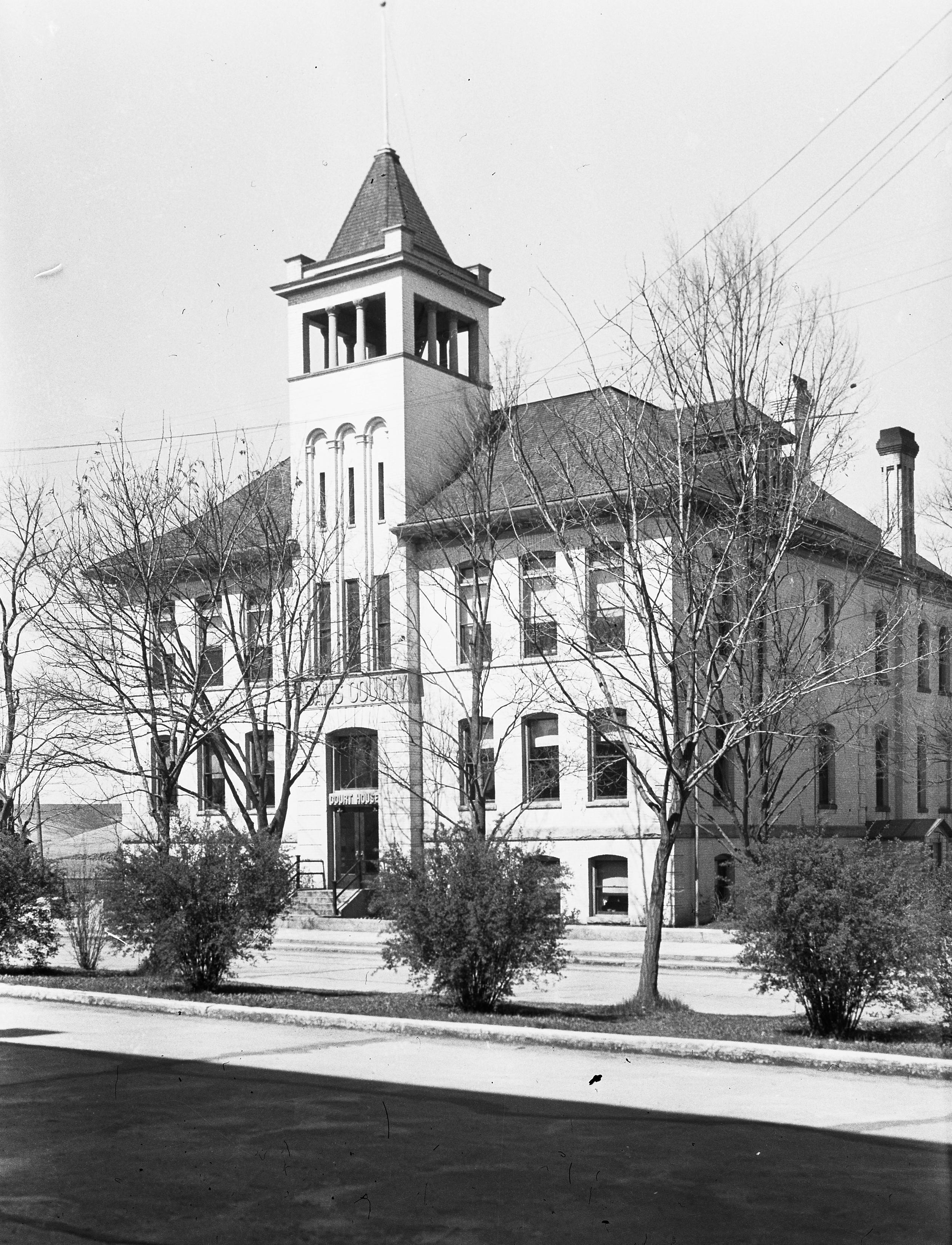
Courthouse after expansion, circa 1915.

In May 1905, under pressure from citizens of the county, an addition to the courthouse was designed by Spokane architects Preusse & Zittel, doubling its square footage, and moving the edge of the building to the sidewalk on West Broadway Ave.; the bell tower was dismantled. Spokane contractors Hastie & Dougan supervised the project, which began in June and was completed in October for a cost of $12,247.

Wheat producers in Adams County used dryland farming in order to overcome the relative aridity of the county's climate. They let the wheatfields lie fallow in alternate years, holding sufficient moisture to raise profitable crops.

The county's population decreased significantly during the first half of the twentieth century, dropping by nearly five thousand from 1910 to 1940.

In 1940 the courthouse was replaced by a three-story building, with a two-story jail at the rear. Construction was completed in December 1940.

In 1943 the Federal government approved the Columbia Basin Project. It began impacting Adams County in 1946, when construction of the East Low Canal and the Potholes East Canal began. This work, and the ensuing increased agricultural production from irrigated crops, led to continual population increases. The population had increased by 12,500 from 1940 to 2010.

== Geography ==
According to the United States Census Bureau, the county has a total area of 1,929.802 square miles (4,998.16 km^{2}), of which 1,924.989 square miles (4,985.70 km^{2}) is land and 4.813 square miles (12.47 km^{2}) (0.3%) is water.

=== Major highways ===
- Interstate 90
- U.S. Route 395

=== Adjacent counties ===
- Lincoln County - north
- Whitman County - east
- Franklin County - south
- Grant County - west

=== National protected areas ===
- Columbia National Wildlife Refuge (part)
- Saddle Mountain National Wildlife Refuge (part)

== Demographics ==
Historical population
Census	Pop.	Note	%±
1890	2,098		—
1900	4,840		130.7%
1910	10,920		125.6%
1920	9,623		−11.9%
1930	7,719		−19.8%
1940	6,209		−19.6%
1950	6,584		6.0%
1960	9,929		50.8%
1970	12,014		21.0%
1980	13,267		10.4%
1990	13,603		2.5%
2000	16,428		20.8%
2010	18,728		14.0%
2020	20,613		10.1%
2025 (est.)	21,488	▲	4.2%
U.S. Decennial Census:

Adams County and Franklin County have the highest per capita percentage of Latino residents in the state. According to the 2020 Census, the Latino population of the county is 13,120 or 63.65% of residents.

As of the first quarter of 2024, the median home value in Adams County was $239,530.

As of the 2022 American Community Survey, there are 6,304 estimated households in Adams County with an average of 3.21 persons per household. The county has a median household income of $63,105. Approximately 14.6% of the county's population lives at or below the poverty line. Adams County has an estimated 62.3% employment rate, with 14.7% of the population holding a bachelor's degree or higher and 71.0% holding a high school diploma.

The top five reported ancestries (people were allowed to report up to two ancestries, thus the figures will generally add to more than 100%) were English (48.9%), Spanish (48.9%), Indo-European (0.8%), Asian and Pacific Islander (0.5%), and Other (0.9%).

Adams County, Washington – racial and ethnic composition
Note: the US Census treats Hispanic/Latino as an ethnic category. This table excludes Latinos from the racial categories and assigns them to a separate category. Hispanics/Latinos may be of any race.

Race / ethnicity (NH = non-Hispanic)	Pop. 1980	Pop. 1990	Pop. 2000	Pop. 2010	Pop. 2020
White alone (NH)	10,133 (76.38%)	8,933 (65.67%)	8,366 (50.93%)	7,262 (38.78%)	6,829 (33.13%)
Black or African American alone (NH)	32 (0.24%)	29 (0.21%)	20 (0.12%)	47 (0.25%)	24 (0.12%)
Native American or Alaska Native alone (NH)	61 (0.46%)	64 (0.47%)	45 (0.27%)	76 (0.41%)	63 (0.31%)
Asian alone (NH)	70 (0.53%)	90 (0.66%)	75 (0.46%)	99 (0.53%)	129 (0.63%)
Pacific Islander alone (NH)	—	—	2 (0.01%)	3 (0.02%)	3 (0.01%)
Other race alone (NH)	18 (0.14%)	20 (0.15%)	9 (0.05%)	18 (0.10%)	87 (0.42%)
Mixed race or multiracial (NH)	—	—	179 (1.09%)	124 (0.66%)	358 (1.74%)
Hispanic or Latino (any race)	2,953 (22.26%)	4,467 (32.84%)	7,732 (47.07%)	11,099 (59.26%)	13,120 (63.65%)
Total	13,267 (100.00%)	13,603 (100.00%)	16,428 (100.00%)	18,728 (100.00%)	20,613 (100.00%)

=== 2020 census ===
As of the 2020 census, there were 20,613 people, 6,228 households, and 4,794 families residing in the county. The population density was 10.7 inhabitants per square mile (4.1/km^{2}). There were 6,735 housing units at an average density of 3.5 inhabitants per square mile (1.4/km^{2}).

Of the residents, 33.9% were under the age of 18 and 11.5% were 65 years of age or older; the median age was 29.7 years. For every 100 females there were 104.0 males, and for every 100 females age 18 and over there were 101.7 males. 52.7% of residents lived in urban areas and 47.3% lived in rural areas, and 8.7% were under the age of 5.

The racial makeup of the county was 44.5% White, 0.2% Black or African American, 2.1% American Indian and Alaska Native, 0.7% Asian, 35.3% from some other race, and 17.1% from two or more races. Hispanic or Latino residents of any race comprised 63.6% of the population.

There were 6,228 households in the county, of which 47.1% had children under the age of 18 living with them and 21.5% had a female householder with no spouse or partner present. About 17.8% of all households were made up of individuals and 8.8% had someone living alone who was 65 years of age or older.

There were 6,735 housing units, of which 7.5% were vacant. Among occupied housing units, 63.6% were owner-occupied and 36.4% were renter-occupied. The homeowner vacancy rate was 1.0% and the rental vacancy rate was 4.8%.

=== 2010 census ===
As of the 2010 census, there were 18,728 people, 5,720 households, and 4,410 families living in the county. The population density was 9.7 inhabitants per square mile (3.7/km^{2}). There were 6,242 housing units at an average density of 3.2 inhabitants per square mile (1.2/km^{2}). The racial makeup of the county was 62.49% White, 0.58% African American, 1.90% Native American, 0.67% Asian, 0.02% Pacific Islander, 31.50% from some other races and 2.84% from two or more races. Hispanic or Latino people of any race were 59.26% of the population.

In terms of ancestry, 16.4% were German, 6.8% were Irish, 5.6% were English, and 2.2% were American.

Of the 5,720 households, 47.9% had children under the age of 18 living with them, 58.7% were married couples living together, 11.8% had a female householder with no husband present, 22.9% were non-families, and 18.8% of all households were made up of individuals. The average household size was 3.25 and the average family size was 3.71. The median age was 29.0 years.

The median income for a household in the county was $40,829 and the median income for a family was $43,551. Males had a median income of $35,695 versus $25,160 for females. The per capita income for the county was $16,689. About 19.0% of families and 25.1% of the population were below the poverty line, including 36.6% of those under age 18 and 12.6% of those age 65 or over.

=== 2000 census ===
As of the 2000 census, there were 16,428 people, 5,229 households, and 4,094 families living in the county. The population density was 8.0 inhabitants per square mile (3.1/km^{2}). There were 5,773 housing units at an average density of 3.0 inhabitants per square mile (1.2/km^{2}). The racial makeup of the county was 64.96% White, 0.28% African American, 0.68% Native American, 0.60% Asian, 0.04% Pacific Islander, 30.69% from some other races and 2.75% from two or more races. Hispanic or Latino people of any race were 47.07% of the population.

In terms of ancestry, 16.3% were of German, 6.2% identified as U.S. or American and 5.6% English ancestry. 57.0% spoke English, 41.7% Spanish and 1.2% German as their first language.

There were 5,229 households, out of which 44.00% had children under the age of 18 living with them, 63.50% were married couples living together, 10.10% had a female householder with no husband present, and 21.70% were non-families. 18.70% of all households were made up of individuals, and 7.70% had someone living alone who was 65 years of age or older. The average household size was 3.09 and the average family size was 3.52.

In the county, the population was spread out, with 34.20% under the age of 18, 9.80% from 18 to 24, 26.30% from 25 to 44, 19.40% from 45 to 64, and 10.40% who were 65 years of age or older. The median age was 30 years. For every 100 females there were 104.50 males. For every 100 females age 18 and over, there were 102.10 males.

The median income for a household in the county was $33,888, and the median income for a family was $37,075. Males had a median income of $28,740 versus $21,597 for females. The per capita income for the county was $13,534. About 13.60% of families and 18.20% of the population were below the poverty line, including 24.00% of those under age 18 and 8.90% of those age 65 or over.

== Communities ==
=== Cities ===
- Othello
- Ritzville (County seat)

=== Towns ===
- Hatton
- Lind
- Washtucna

=== Unincorporated communities ===
- Benge
- Cunningham
- Marcellus
- Marengo
- Paha
- Ralston

=== Ghost towns ===
- Ankeny
- Keystone
- Rockwell
- Servia
- Taunton
- Tokio

== Politics ==
Adams is a strongly Republican county. The last Democrat to win the county was Franklin D. Roosevelt in 1936. It was one of only three counties in the state to be won by Barry Goldwater in 1964. Adams County's unbroken streak of Republican votes in presidential elections is the longest of any county in Washington. The Republican candidate has won by more than 13 points in every Presidential election since 1968, with margins of over 30 points in the seven presidential elections since 2000. George W. Bush won the county by over 40 points both times he ran.

In other elections the results fare similarly. The last Democratic candidate for governor to carry Adams County was Clarence D. Martin in 1936. The last Democratic candidate for the U.S. Senate to win the county was Henry M. Jackson in 1982.

In the 2008 presidential election, John McCain received 66.32% of the county's vote. Meanwhile, Republican gubernatorial candidate Dino Rossi received 69.83% of the county's vote. The county also gave Republican representative Cathy McMorris Rodgers 82.45% of the vote. Republican Sam Reed received 74.6% of the county's vote in his run for re-election as Washington Secretary of State, Republican Allan Martin received 67.25% of the vote for state treasurer, and Republican Rob McKenna received 76.28% in his re-election run for attorney general. All county positions for which candidates were affiliated with parties were won by Republicans.

United States presidential election results for Adams County, Washington
Year	Republican		Democratic		Third party(ies)	
Year	No.	%	No.	%	No.	%
1892	244	42.81%	139	24.39%	187	32.81%
1896	243	38.82%	372	59.42%	11	1.76%
1900	461	44.98%	523	51.02%	41	4.00%
1904	1,138	64.44%	548	31.03%	80	4.53%
1908	1,033	55.81%	714	38.57%	104	5.62%
1912	398	17.02%	949	40.59%	991	42.39%
1916	1,237	46.28%	1,294	48.41%	142	5.31%
1920	1,525	67.15%	515	22.68%	231	10.17%
1924	760	37.51%	228	11.25%	1,038	51.23%
1928	1,473	64.07%	807	35.10%	19	0.83%
1932	867	35.68%	1,504	61.89%	59	2.43%
1936	657	24.69%	1,944	73.06%	60	2.25%
1940	1,508	51.68%	1,397	47.88%	13	0.45%
1944	1,666	60.80%	1,062	38.76%	12	0.44%
1948	1,394	51.96%	1,267	47.22%	22	0.82%
1952	2,181	66.29%	1,104	33.56%	5	0.15%
1956	2,267	57.48%	1,673	42.42%	4	0.10%
1960	2,479	58.80%	1,732	41.08%	5	0.12%
1964	2,241	52.45%	2,027	47.44%	5	0.12%
1968	2,572	62.11%	1,270	30.67%	299	7.22%
1972	3,083	68.22%	1,110	24.56%	326	7.21%
1976	2,795	58.56%	1,790	37.50%	188	3.94%
1980	3,248	68.01%	1,223	25.61%	305	6.39%
1984	3,449	71.72%	1,311	27.26%	49	1.02%
1988	2,612	60.91%	1,612	37.59%	64	1.49%
1992	2,087	45.52%	1,449	31.60%	1,049	22.88%
1996	2,356	51.06%	1,740	37.71%	518	11.23%
2000	3,440	69.16%	1,406	28.27%	128	2.57%
2004	3,751	73.16%	1,315	25.65%	61	1.19%
2008	3,222	66.32%	1,552	31.95%	84	1.73%
2012	3,171	66.16%	1,540	32.13%	82	1.71%
2016	3,083	64.47%	1,299	27.16%	400	8.36%
2020	3,907	66.65%	1,814	30.95%	141	2.41%
2024	3,767	70.21%	1,455	27.12%	143	2.67%

== Courthouses ==
From Ritzville's designation as county seat in 1884 until 1892, courts were briefly held in rented space before the county purchased a building from N.H. Greene in 1885. In 1891 the commission bonded $20,000 in order to erect a permanent courthouse. The building was built by the Spokane firm of Burnham and Clapp and completed by August 20, 1891, when it was accepted by the county. It was a two-story brick building with a four-story tower and a stone basement. A two-story addition was added to the front in 1905 with a new four-story tower, giving the courthouse a whole new appearance. This building was replaced by the current art-deco courthouse in 1940.

== See also ==
- National Register of Historic Places listings in Adams County, Washington
- List of counties in Washington
