= Cunningham, Adams County, Washington =

Unincorporated community in Washington, United States

Cunningham, Washington
- Unincorporated community
- Location within Washington (state)
- Coordinates: 46°49′20″N 118°48′23″W
- Country: United States
- State: Washington
- County: Adams
- Elevation: 1,191 ft (363 m)
- Time zone: UTC-8 (Pacific (PST))
  - Summer (DST): UTC-7 (PDT)
- ZIP code: 99341
- Area code: 509
- GNIS feature ID: 1512130

Cunningham is an unincorporated community in Adams County, Washington, United States. Previously called Scott by railroad surveyors, the town was platted in 1901 by preacher and land promoter W. R. Cunningham. The two names (Scott for the station, and Cunningham for the town) persisted until the station was renamed in August 1902.

The town built up around the Northern Pacific Railway station. With a peak population of 500 in 1913, most business success was from producing and shipping Palouse wheat. The town included several stores, a school, churches, electric lighting, and a newspaper (The Cunningham Gazette). After drought conditions in the 1910s and a severe fire in 1916, the population began to diminish. The schools closed in 1925 and 1926. The Post Office closed in 1985, and only a few houses remain today.

Cunningham is on the Hatton U.S. Geological Survey Map.
