= Marengo, Adams County, Washington =

Unincorporated community in Washington, United States

Marengo, Washington
- Unincorporated community
- Location within Washington (state)
- Coordinates: 47°01′33″N 118°11′19″W
- Country: United States
- State: Washington
- County: Adams
- Elevation: 1,644 ft (501 m)
- Time zone: UTC-8 (Pacific (PST))
  - Summer (DST): UTC-7 (PDT)
- ZIP code: 99169
- Area code: 509
- GNIS feature ID: 1511527

Marengo is an unincorporated community in Adams County, Washington. A line of the Union Pacific Railroad runs through the community.

The community's name commemorates the Battle of Marengo.
