= Lakeside Subdivision =

Railway line in eastern Washington state, U.S.

The Lakeside Subdivision is a railway line in eastern Washington running about 149.4 miles (240.4 km) from Sunset Junction, west of Spokane to Pasco. It is operated by BNSF Railway and is considered part of the Northern Transcon.

The line is used by the Portland section of Amtrak's Empire Builder.

== History ==
The line originated from the former Spokane, Portland and Seattle Railway and former Northern Pacific Railway.

To accommodate growing rail traffic throughout the Northwest Transcon, BNSF has been expanding rail sidings into expanded sections of double track. This includes a 4.5-mile (7.2 km) section of track that expanded the siding in Tokio to Ritzville.
