= Chewelah, Washington =

Chewelah
- City
- Chewelah, Washington
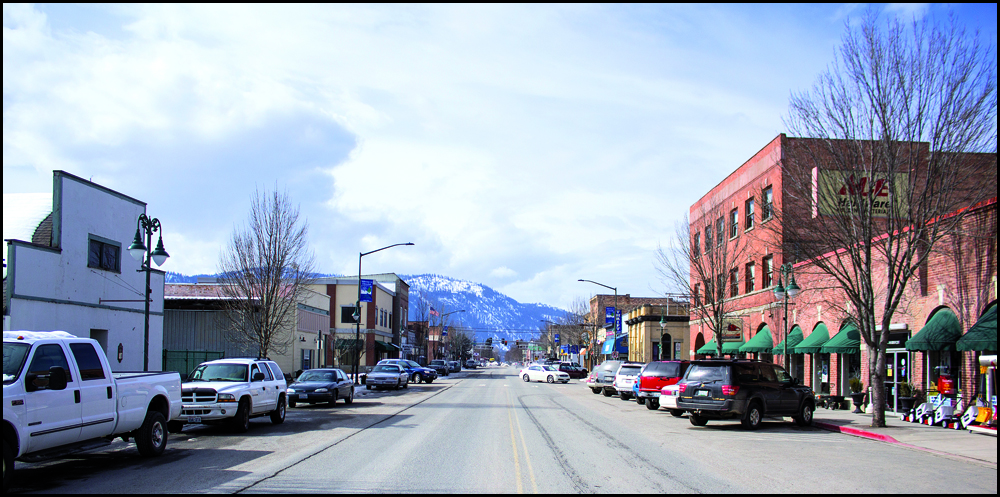
- Main Avenue in Downtown Chewelah, 2018

- Location of Chewelah, Washington

- Location in the United States
- Coordinates: 48°17′48″N 117°44′21″W
- Country: United States
- State: Washington
- County: Stevens

Government
  - Mayor: Dorothy Knauss

Area
  - Total: 2.95 sq mi (7.65 km^{2})
  - Land: 2.95 sq mi (7.65 km^{2})
  - Water: 0 sq mi (0.00 km^{2})
- Elevation: 1,673 ft (510 m)

Population (2020)
  - Total: 2,470
  - Density: 836/sq mi (323/km^{2})
- Time zone: UTC-8 (Pacific (PST))
  - Summer (DST): UTC-7 (PDT)
- ZIP code: 99109
- Area code: 509
- FIPS code: 53-12140
- GNIS feature ID: 2409444
- Website: www.cityofchewelah.org

Chewelah (/tʃəˈwiːlə/ chə-WEE-lə) is a city in Stevens County, Washington, United States. It is located approximately 45 mi (72 km) northwest of Spokane. The population was 2,470 at the 2020 census.

== History ==
The name of the town comes from a Kalispel word, sč̓ewíleʔ, meaning 'watersnake' or 'gartersnake'. Prior to colonization by European-Americans, Chewelah was home to a band of the Kalispel people. The band was known as the slet̓éw̓si, meaning "valley people". Originally, the area was called Fool's Prairie, after the indigenous Kalispel who left his own tribe because of a dispute. Chewelah and the rest of the Colville River Valley were part of the Colville Indian Reservation from April 9, 1872, when the reservation was created, until July 2, 1872, when a subsequent executive order reduced the size of the reservation. The Chewelah Band of Indians is currently part of the Spokane Tribe.

Thomas and Mary Brown moved to the Fool's Prairie in 1859. On May 8, 1872, Thomas Brown received authority to establish a post office called Chewelah. The name was first used in Stevens County Commissioner Journals on May 6, 1872. That post office disbanded on February 23, 1875. In 1879, the post office was reestablished with Major John Simms, Indian Agent, as postmaster. Chewelah was officially incorporated on January 26, 1903.

Chewelah is a town of firsts in Stevens County. It had the first Protestant Congregational Church in 1891, the first school in 1869, the Spokane Falls and Northern Railway arrived in 1889, a Catholic church was established in 1885, and the first county newspaper was founded in July 1885.

Initially, Chewelah was a pioneer settlement, being an agricultural center that can be traced back to the early 1870s and having prospectors working the adjacent countryside as early as 1842. The town was platted in 1884 and became known for being a rough and tumble mining town; the first lead and silver mines were established around 1886, and others followed in Embry and surrounding areas.

The town's newspaper, The Independent, was founded by William Hunter Brownlow (1860–1946) in 1903 and has been in publication ever since. The first issue came off the press on June 19, 1903, with the help of his four sons—Truman, Ralph, Arthur, and Alex—Brownlow. The family produced a weekly eight-page newspaper.

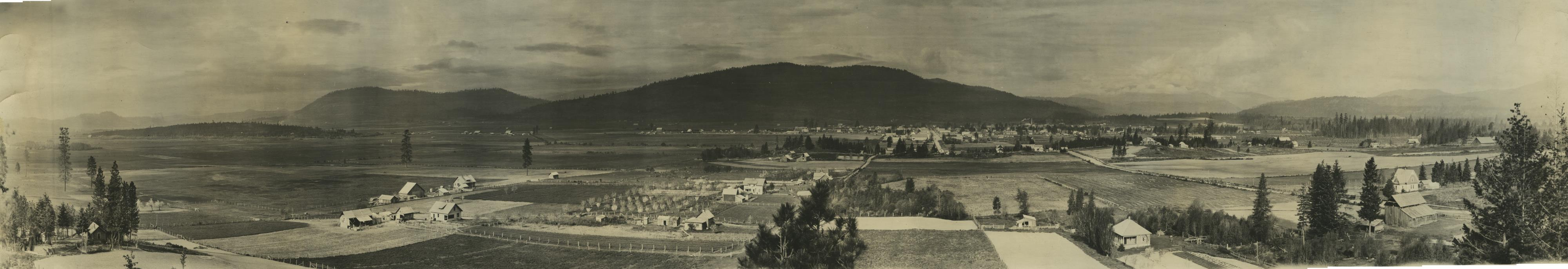
Panorama circa 1904.

By 1905, the population had reached 650, and within a few years many prosperous copper, silver, lead, and some gold mines were flourishing in the area. The most successful ore mined in Chewelah was magnesite. By 1916, Chewelah's plant was said to be the largest producer of magnesite in the country, and at full production was the largest producer in the world, shipping some 700 tons daily. During the war, there were as many as 800 people working at the plant making high temperature-resistant refractory brick.

By 1920 Chewelah's population had grown to 1,600 people and continued to grow until the late 1960s. In 1968, the magnesite plant closed down due to cheaper competition from Japan and changes in the steel industry. Despite this major change, Chewelah survived the transition from being a "one-company town", and today Chewelah has over two-thousand residents and displays a blend of the past and future. With its moderate climate, dry land, and irrigated farming, ranching and dairy farming continue to be mainstays. Chewelah's diversified economy also includes a ski area and golf course, among other industries.

In June 2019, the Chewelah Creative District became the second state-designated creative district in the state, following a similar designation for Edmonds.

== Geography ==
According to the United States Census Bureau, the city has a total area of 2.98 square miles (7.72 km^{2}), all land.

=== Climate ===
This climatic region is typified by large seasonal temperature differences, with warm to hot (and often humid) summers and cold (sometimes severely cold) winters. According to the Köppen Climate Classification system, Chewelah has a humid continental climate, abbreviated "Dfb" on climate maps.

Climate data for Chewelah
Month	Jan	Feb	Mar	Apr	May	Jun	Jul	Aug	Sep	Oct	Nov	Dec	Year
Record high °F (°C)	57 (14)	62 (17)	75 (24)	91 (33)	100 (38)	106 (41)	107 (42)	110 (43)	104 (40)	92 (33)	69 (21)	58 (14)	110 (43)
Mean daily maximum °F (°C)	33.9 (1.1)	40.8 (4.9)	49.2 (9.6)	61.6 (16.4)	69.4 (20.8)	76.2 (24.6)	86.6 (30.3)	83.9 (28.8)	75.5 (24.2)	61.5 (16.4)	45.5 (7.5)	36.9 (2.7)	60.1 (15.6)
Mean daily minimum °F (°C)	19.8 (−6.8)	23.6 (−4.7)	27.8 (−2.3)	33.9 (1.1)	40.3 (4.6)	45.7 (7.6)	51.9 (11.1)	50.7 (10.4)	45.5 (7.5)	36 (2)	28.3 (−2.1)	23.8 (−4.6)	35.6 (2.0)
Record low °F (°C)	−38 (−39)	−38 (−39)	−12 (−24)	12 (−11)	16 (−9)	26 (−3)	31 (−1)	28 (−2)	12 (−11)	2 (−17)	−19 (−28)	−33 (−36)	−38 (−39)
Average precipitation inches (mm)	2.3 (58)	1.74 (44)	1.83 (46)	1.44 (37)	1.75 (44)	1.66 (42)	0.82 (21)	0.8 (20)	1.06 (27)	1.47 (37)	2.4 (61)	2.9 (74)	20.17 (512)
Average snowfall inches (cm)	14 (36)	8.4 (21)	3.6 (9.1)	0.4 (1.0)	0 (0)	0 (0)	0 (0)	0 (0)	0 (0)	0.4 (1.0)	3.7 (9.4)	11.8 (30)	42.4 (108)
Average precipitation days (≥ 0.01 inch)	12	9	10	9	10	9	5	5	6	9	12	13	109

== Demographics ==
Historical population
Census	Pop.	Note	%±
1910	823		—
1920	1,288		56.5%
1930	1,315		2.1%
1940	1,565		19.0%
1950	1,683		7.5%
1960	1,525		−9.4%
1970	1,365		−10.5%
1980	1,888		38.3%
1990	1,945		3.0%
2000	2,186		12.4%
2010	2,607		19.3%
2020	2,470		−5.3%
U.S. Decennial Census

=== 2020 census ===
As of the 2020 census, Chewelah had a population of 2,470. The median age was 47.7 years. 20.9% of residents were under the age of 18 and 27.4% of residents were 65 years of age or older. For every 100 females there were 85.6 males, and for every 100 females age 18 and over there were 81.8 males age 18 and over.

0.0% of residents lived in urban areas, while 100.0% lived in rural areas.

There were 1,129 households in Chewelah, of which 24.3% had children under the age of 18 living in them. Of all households, 41.3% were married-couple households, 17.6% were households with a male householder and no spouse or partner present, and 33.6% were households with a female householder and no spouse or partner present. About 34.7% of all households were made up of individuals and 18.7% had someone living alone who was 65 years of age or older.

There were 1,220 housing units, of which 7.5% were vacant. The homeowner vacancy rate was 1.1% and the rental vacancy rate was 3.2%.

Racial composition as of the 2020 census
Race	Number	Percent
White	2,165	87.7%
Black or African American	7	0.3%
American Indian and Alaska Native	37	1.5%
Asian	15	0.6%
Native Hawaiian and Other Pacific Islander	7	0.3%
Some other race	59	2.4%
Two or more races	180	7.3%
Hispanic or Latino (of any race)	131	5.3%

=== 2010 census ===
As of the 2010 census, there were 2,607 people, 1,150 households, and 690 families residing in the city. The population density was 874.8 inhabitants per square mile (337.8/km^{2}). There were 1,284 housing units at an average density of 430.9 per square mile (166.4/km^{2}). The racial makeup of the city was 93.1% White, 0.2% African American, 1.7% Native American, 0.5% Asian, 0.7% from other races, and 3.7% from two or more races. Hispanic or Latino of any race were 2.8% of the population.

There were 1,150 households, of which 26.5% had children under the age of 18 living with them, 44.6% were married couples living together, 11.3% had a female householder with no husband present, 4.1% had a male householder with no wife present, and 40.0% were non-families. 35.6% of all households were made up of individuals, and 18.7% had someone living alone who was 65 years of age or older. The average household size was 2.22 and the average family size was 2.85.

The median age in the city was 45.2 years. 23% of residents were under the age of 18; 5.6% were between the ages of 18 and 24; 21.2% were from 25 to 44; 25.7% were from 45 to 64; and 24.6% were 65 years of age or older. The gender makeup of the city was 46.6% male and 53.4% female.

=== 2000 census ===
As of the 2000 census, there were 2,186 people, 911 households, and 562 families residing in the city. The population density was 743.0 people per square mile (287.1/km^{2}). There were 1,004 housing units at an average density of 341.2 per square mile (131.9/km^{2}). The racial makeup of the city was 92.96% White, 0.05% African American, 1.69% Native American, 0.69% Asian, 0.05% Pacific Islander, 0.91% from other races, and 3.66% from two or more races (also .01% Kari). Hispanic or Latino of any race were 2.70% of the population.

There were 911 households, out of which 29.9% had children under the age of 18 living with them, 46.9% were married couples living together, 11.0% had a female householder with no husband present, and 38.3% were non-families. 33.4% of all households were made up of individuals, and 18.6% had someone living alone who was 65 years of age or older. The average household size was 2.32 and the average family size was 2.98.

In the city, the age distribution of the population shows 26.5% under the age of 18, 6.0% from 18 to 24, 23.1% from 25 to 44, 22.3% from 45 to 64, and 22.0% who were 65 years of age or older. The median age was 42 years. For every 100 females, there were 89.8 males. For every 100 females age 18 and over, there were 82.0 males.

The median income for a household in the city was $25,238, and the median income for a family was $33,750. Males had a median income of $36,065 versus $18,938 for females. The per capita income for the city was $13,843. About 13.9% of families and 18.3% of the population were below the poverty line, including 19.9% of those under age 18 and 15.7% of those age 65 or over.

== Arts and culture ==
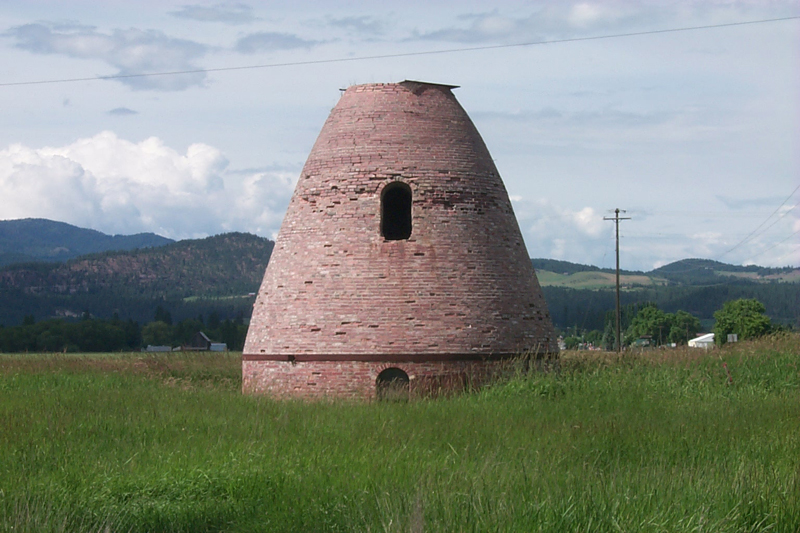
Beehive kiln along U.S. 395 in 1999

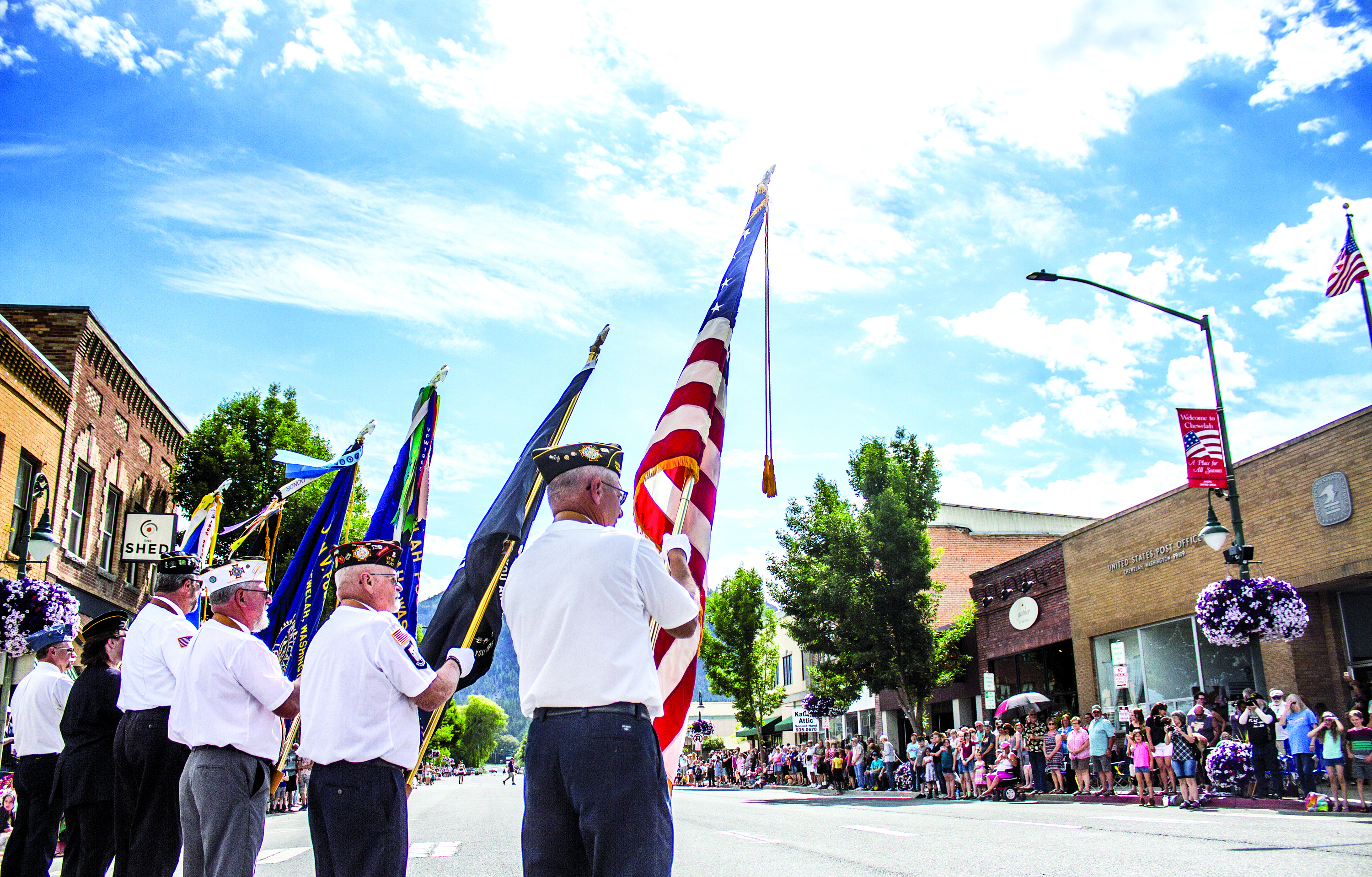
The start of the 2019 Chataqua parade in downtown Chewelah

=== Events ===
- Chataqua – formerly (1978–2020)
- James Dean Days (held on the first Saturday in August) – Car show and hot rod festival
- Winterfest – Yearly food truck and beer festival with live music and bonfires

=== Attractions ===
- Chewelah Museum
- Chewelah Golf and Country Club
- Chewelah Center for the Arts
- StageTime Theatre School
- Chewelah City Park
- Waitts Lake
- Copper Mine Hike
- Quartzite Mountain Trail, maintained by the Chewelah Boy Scout Troop 998

== Education ==
- Chewelah School District

== Media ==
- Newspaper – The Independent
- Radio – KCHW

== Notable people ==
- David P. Jenkins – American Civil War cavalry officer and postbellum philanthropist
- John R. Monaghan – U.S. naval officer killed in action during the Second Samoan Civil War
- Allen Stone – soul musician
