= Tokio, Washington =

Ghost town in Washington (state)

- Unincorporated community, Ghost town
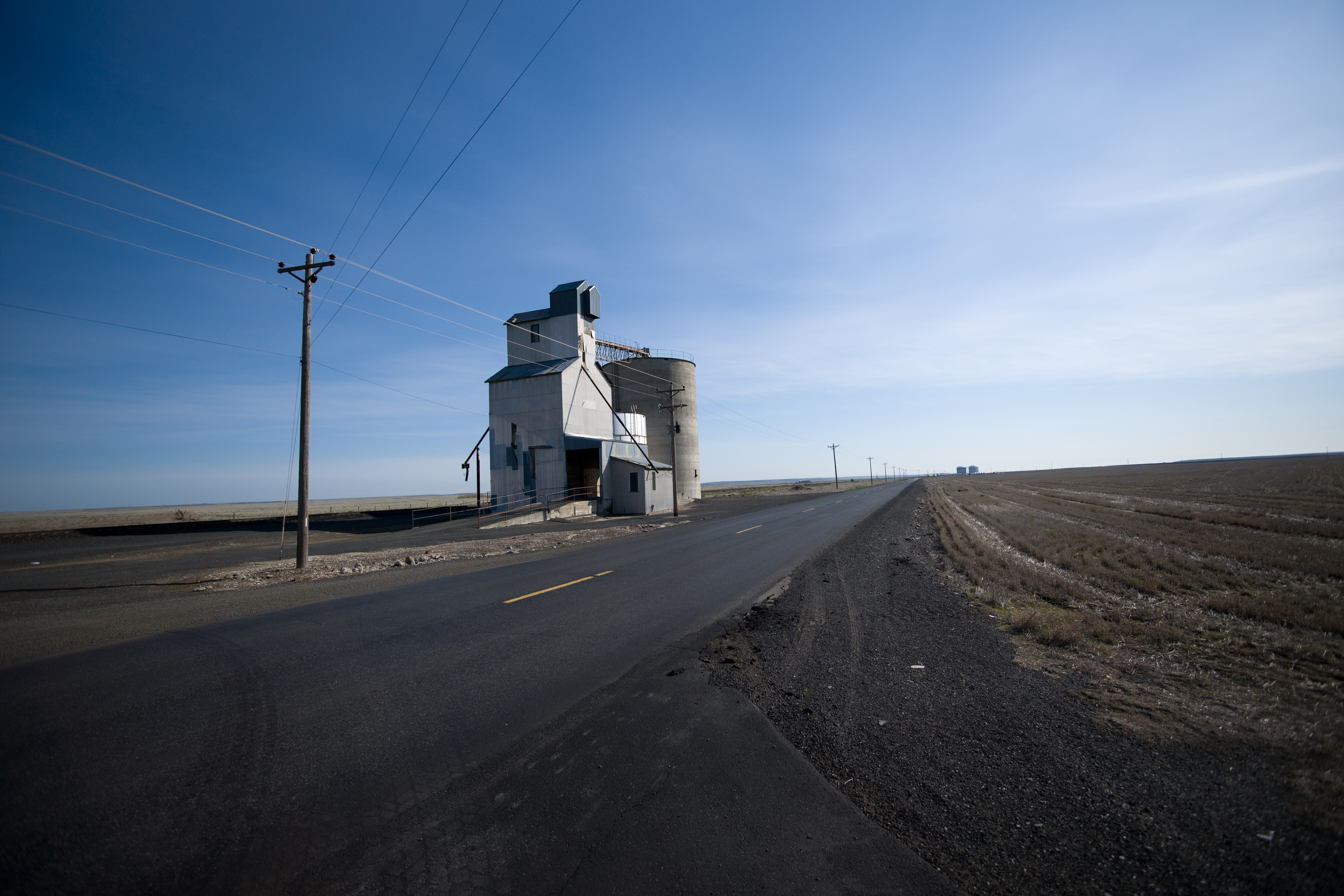

- Location within Washington (state) Location within the United States
- Coordinates: 47°12′35″N 118°16′11″W
- Country: United States
- State: Washington
- County: Adams
- Elevation: 1,946 ft (593 m)
- Time zone: UTC-8 (Pacific (PST))
  - Summer (DST): UTC-7 (PDT)
- ZIP code: 99169
- Area code: 509
- GNIS feature ID: 1511567

Tokio is a rural location and former rural community in Adams County, in the Palouse region of eastern Washington. It is located along Interstate 90 northeast of Ritzville.

== History ==
In 1888, Northern Pacific Railway railway officials named the railroad stop at this location "Iona." It was changed to Tracy in 1905, and then Tokio in 1906.

In the early 20th century the community had a rural school; its enrollment in 1917-18 was 10 pupils. Essentially the small community of that period has since dissipated.

Several wheat fields in Tokio and neighboring areas were destroyed by a 20,000-acre (8,100 ha) fire on July 31, 1998, which killed one farmer. His wheat crop was harvested by neighbors in a community celebration of life.

The freeway exit is adjacent to a weigh station, which inspired the name of a Spokane band. The weigh station has a truck stop and restaurant, along with a recreational cannabis store that opened in 2016. The truck stop was also used as a filming location for The Promise, an independent movie released in 2004.
