= Cascade City =

Cascade City, British Columbia aka: Cascade, British Columbia
- Ghost town
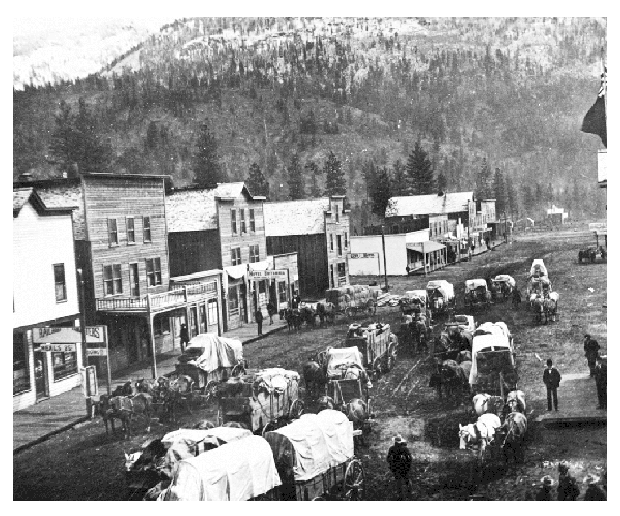
- American freight wagons at Cascade City in 1898
- Nickname: Gateway to the Boundary Country
- Location of Cascade City in British Columbia
- Coordinates: 49°01′00″N 118°12′00″W
- Country: Canada
- Province: British Columbia
- Regions of Canada#British Columbia: Boundary Country
- Regional District: Kootenay Boundary
- Founded: 1896
- Elevation: 510 m (1,660 ft)

Population
  - Total: 0
  - 1890s: 1,500
- Time zone: UTC-8 (PST)

Cascade City or Cascade was a Canadian Pacific Railway construction era boom town in the Boundary Country of the West Kootenay region of British Columbia, Canada. Because of its location near the Canada–United States border, it was also called the "Gateway to the Boundary Country".

Founded in 1896, it was named after the nearby Cascade Falls on the Kettle River.

Cascade City was located 1 km north of the Canada–United States border, 6 km (3.7 mi) south of Christina Lake and 20 km (12 mi) east of Grand Forks.

== History ==
The property at Cascade City was originally owned by an American, Aaron Chandler, from North Dakota. Seeing the potential of the area, Chandler formed the Cascade Development Company and with his agent, George Stocker, subdivided the land into town lots and began selling them to enterprising businessmen.

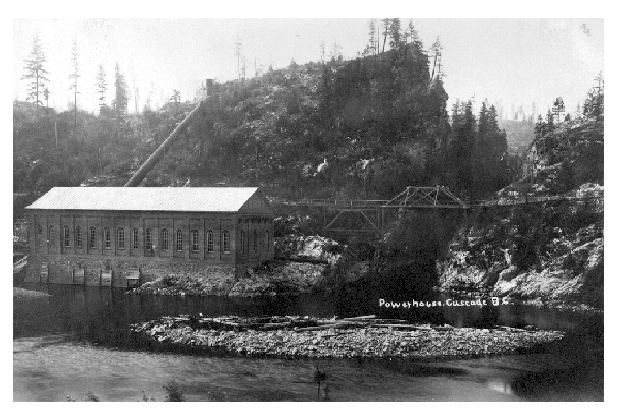
Powerhouse on Kettle River in 1910

Impetus for the decision to promote Cascade City was the local mining and rail construction, but the future looked even brighter when the Cascade Water and Power Company was formed and a hydro electric dam and powerhouse was built on Kettle River in 1897. The powerhouse would provide electricity to Grand Forks, Phoenix and Greenwood.

The early townsite only had two buildings: a general store and a restaurant. Chandler himself slept in a tent. However, by the time the railway construction crews arrived in 1898, Cascade City was booming and although there were fourteen hotels, there was rarely a room available.

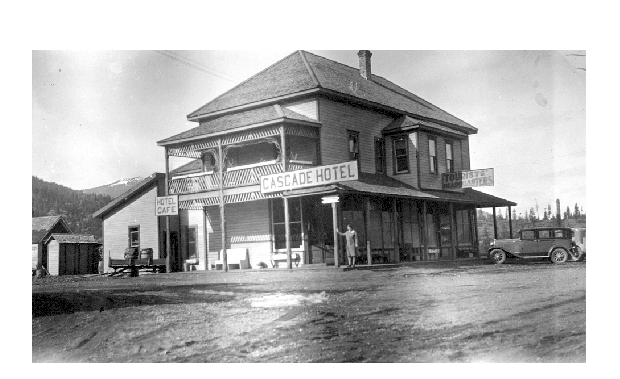
Cascade Hotel

There were numerous brothels where an estimated 60 ladies of the evening, such as "Scrap Iron Minnie" and "Rough Lock Nell" plied their trade.

The first local government began with the creation of the Tax Payer's Association in December, 1897. The members petitioned the provincial government at Victoria for schools, roads, bridges, a provincial police constable and a jail.

=== The Doon gang and the tobacco robbery ===
The need for police and a jail had become evident just the previous month before the Association was formed when a gang broke into the British Columbia Mercantile and Mining Syndicate's store, relieving them of 150 pounds of tobacco and one shotgun.

The store's manager, Stanley Mayall, realized that the thieves intended to sell the tobacco and informed every nearby store and mining camp of the crime. It wasn't long before the owner of a tobacco shop approached Mayall with the news that he had a rough-looking salesman in his store trying to sell him a large quantity of tobacco. Because there were no local police, Mayall's book-keeper was swiftly armed and deputized and sent to make the arrest.

The book-keeper, a man by the name of Morgan, successfully made the arrest and detained the suspect, John Doon, in a sturdy house that belonged to a local carpenter. Later that evening, Morgan found his newfound duties were called for again, when the storekeeper came back to tell Mayall that a second man was in his store inquiring after the first. The second arrest was also successful, but not as peaceful, as Morgan had to wrestle a 12 inch long Bowie knife away from the man. Back at the carpenter's house, this second man turned to Doon and asked, "Where are the other three?", alerting Mayall and Morgan to the fact that they had three more arrests to make before the case was closed.

The two in custody were sent to Grand Forks to stand trial and then a third man was arrested in Cascade. While he was incarcerated at the carpenter's house, the final two men tried to free him. The town watchman, an Irishman by the name of Pat Kennedy tried to arrest them but was shot in the chest. Nevertheless, he doggedly pursued the three robbers and captured one, while the other two escaped across the border. The last member was taken to Grand Forks to join the other two in custody, and they were all given $50 fines and sentenced six months in jail.

=== The coming of the railroad ===
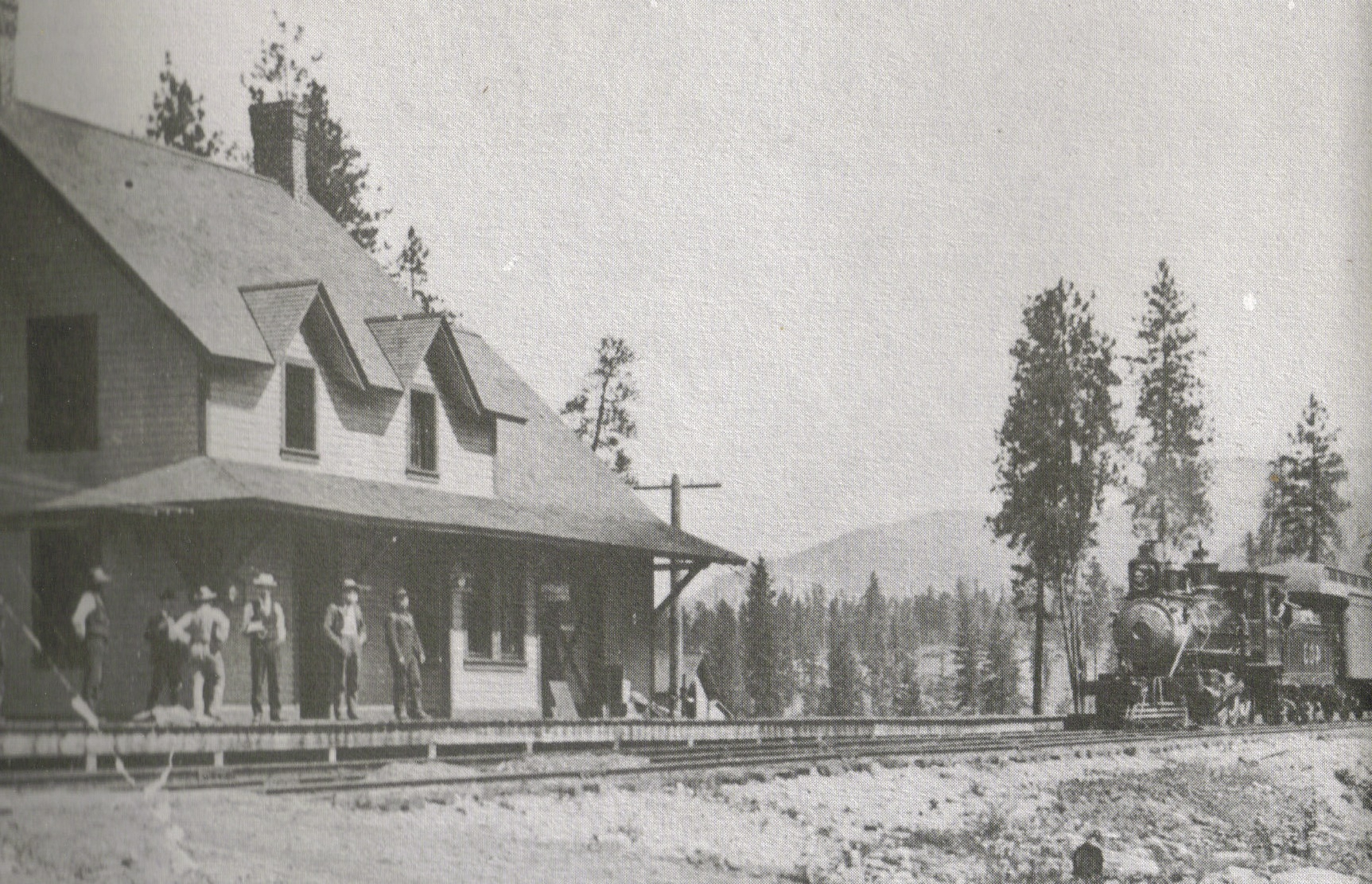
Columbia and Western Railway Station at Cascade in 1899

When it was announced that the CPR intended to build a smelter at Cascade, the town's future seemed assured. The local newspaper, the Cascade Record raved about the potential employment opportunities that the $500,000 smelter brought to the town and predicted that it would employ 500 to 2,000 men. The town's hopes would soon be shattered, however, when the railway chose to build the smelter in Trail instead.

On August 12, 1899, the Columbia and Western Railway, later CPR, arrived in Cascade City from the Kettle River Bridge. The town held a celebration and $25 was donated for refreshments for the railway's labourers.

=== The fires ===
On September 30, 1899, just over six weeks after the arrival of the railway, Cascade City was hit by a devastating fire. The blaze started in an empty shack and spread rapidly, burning down six hotels and several other structures within the space of half an hour. The town had no fire department and the decision was made to create a firebreak by using dynamite on some of the threatened buildings. One man's life was lost when he rushed into a hotel to rescue some patrons. Few of the hotels that were lost had fire insurance.

In 1899 a newspaper called the Cascade Record reported the fire on the front page. In the article it was stated "The Chinese cook at the Grand Central carefully carried a ham out to safety, and left $70 in money to be burned up in his room". Local historian Bill Barlee believes the money was in gold and silver coinage. Bill states the coins lay where they fell during the fire. The coins may still be at the Cascade site. Barlee has recovered a number of silver coins from the Cascade site. The original $70 would be worth about $1,400 today.

Rebuilding had scarcely begun when the town was hit by another major fire in 1901. All but 75 of the residents left and the town faded into obscurity.

== Today ==
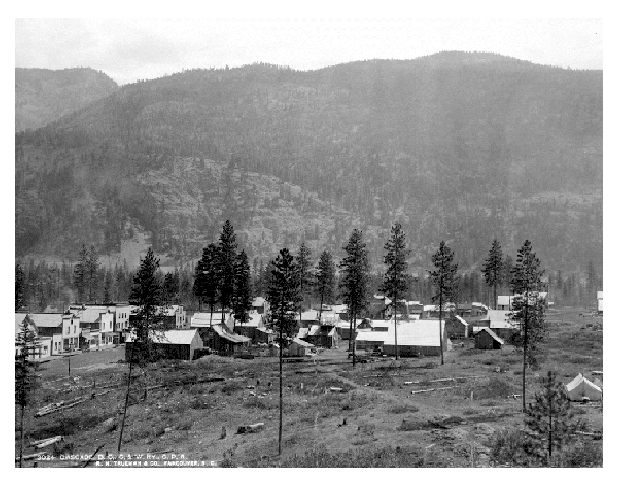
Cascade in 1929

For many years, Cascade survived as a customs port. In 1920 there were 150 residents and a store. The powerhouse closed in that late '20s and the final blow came in 1947, when the historic Ritchie store and the post-office burned down. The CPR station was abandoned by 1968 and the post office was amalgamated with the Christina Lake Post Office in 1973.

Today, the only remainder of Cascade City is the old cemetery on the opposite side of the Kettle River. The Christina Lake Golf Club's 18 hole golf course sits on much of what was the original townsite.

== Television ==
Cascade City has been featured on the historical television series Gold Trails and Ghost Towns, season 2, episode 3.

== Climate ==
Cascade City has a warm-summer humid continental climate (Dfb) bordering on an oceanic climate (Cfb), with cold winters and warm summers. Precipitation is dispersed roughly evenly throughout the year, though there is a slight maxima in May and June followed by a drier period in August.

Climate data for Billings, British Columbia (normals 1981-2010)
Month	Jan	Feb	Mar	Apr	May	Jun	Jul	Aug	Sep	Oct	Nov	Dec	Year
Record high °F (°C)	51.8 (11.0)	56.3 (13.5)	75.2 (24.0)	88.7 (31.5)	99.5 (37.5)	98.6 (37.0)	105.8 (41.0)	103.1 (39.5)	102.2 (39.0)	84.2 (29.0)	62.6 (17.0)	48.2 (9.0)	105.8 (41.0)
Mean daily maximum °F (°C)	30.9 (−0.6)	37.8 (3.2)	49.8 (9.9)	60.6 (15.9)	68.5 (20.3)	75.4 (24.1)	84.6 (29.2)	84.0 (28.9)	74.7 (23.7)	57.2 (14.0)	39.4 (4.1)	30.2 (−1.0)	57.7 (14.3)
Daily mean °F (°C)	26.1 (−3.3)	30.6 (−0.8)	39.7 (4.3)	48.4 (9.1)	55.8 (13.2)	62.2 (16.8)	69.6 (20.9)	68.7 (20.4)	60.4 (15.8)	46.8 (8.2)	34.2 (1.2)	25.7 (−3.5)	47.3 (8.5)
Mean daily minimum °F (°C)	21.2 (−6.0)	23.4 (−4.8)	29.5 (−1.4)	36.1 (2.3)	42.6 (5.9)	48.7 (9.3)	54.1 (12.3)	53.1 (11.7)	45.9 (7.7)	36.3 (2.4)	28.8 (−1.8)	21.6 (−5.8)	36.7 (2.6)
Record low °F (°C)	−16.6 (−27.0)	−15.7 (−26.5)	3.2 (−16.0)	21.2 (−6.0)	26.6 (−3.0)	34.7 (1.5)	41.9 (5.5)	38.3 (3.5)	27.5 (−2.5)	12.2 (−11.0)	−13.0 (−25.0)	−19.3 (−28.5)	−19.3 (−28.5)
Average precipitation inches (mm)	1.94 (49.4)	1.30 (32.9)	1.52 (38.7)	1.82 (46.3)	2.54 (64.4)	2.51 (63.8)	1.41 (35.8)	0.89 (22.7)	1.18 (30.0)	1.38 (35.0)	2.26 (57.5)	2.36 (60.0)	21.13 (536.6)
Average rainfall inches (mm)	0.45 (11.4)	0.55 (13.9)	1.18 (30.0)	1.82 (46.3)	2.54 (64.4)	2.51 (63.8)	1.41 (35.8)	0.89 (22.7)	1.18 (30.0)	1.35 (34.2)	1.33 (33.8)	0.59 (15.1)	15.80 (401.2)
Average snowfall inches (cm)	15.0 (38.1)	7.5 (19.1)	3.4 (8.7)	0.0 (0.0)	0.0 (0.0)	0.0 (0.0)	0.0 (0.0)	0.0 (0.0)	0.0 (0.0)	0.4 (0.9)	9.3 (23.6)	17.7 (45.0)	53.3 (135.3)
Average precipitation days (≥ 0.2 mm)	11.8	9.2	10.6	12.2	13.9	12.0	7.7	5.6	6.4	10.1	13.8	13.9	127.2
Average rainy days (≥ 0.2 mm)	3.2	4.5	8.6	12.2	13.9	12.0	7.7	5.6	6.4	10.1	8.7	3.8	96.6
Average snowy days (≥ 2 mm)	9.7	6.6	2.5	0.1	0.0	0.0	0.0	0.0	0.0	0.27	6.1	11.3	35.5
Source: Environment Canada

== See also ==
- List of ghost towns in British Columbia

== Bibliography ==
- Barlee, N.L. (1976). Historic Treasures and lost mines of British Columbia. Canada West Publications.
- Paterson, Thomas (1963). Encyclopedia of Ghost Towns and Mining Camps of British Columbia. Sunfire Publications. ISBN 978-0-88983-025-7.
- Ramsey, Bruce (1963). Ghost Towns of British Columbia. Mitchell Press.
- Turnbull, Elsie (1988). Ghost Towns and Drowned Towns of West Kootenay. Heritage House. ISBN 0-919214-61-4.
