= Colville River (Washington) =

Location
- Country: United States
- State: Washington

Physical characteristics
- Source
  - coordinates: 48°7′11″N 117°45′49″W
  - elevation: 2,146 ft (654 m)
- Mouth: Columbia River
  - location: Franklin D. Roosevelt Lake, Washington (state)
  - coordinates: 48°34′23″N 118°6′24″W
  - elevation: 1,300 ft (400 m)
- Basin size: 1,010 mi^{2} (2,600 km^{2})
- Discharge
  - location: mouth
  - average: 429 cu ft/s (12.1 m^{3}/s)

The Colville River is a 60-mile (100 km) long tributary of the Columbia River in northeastern Washington in the United States. The Colville River begins in southern Stevens County, Washington at the confluence of Sheep Creek and Deer Creek. It flows northwest past Colville and into the Columbia River near Kettle Falls.

Watershed The Colville River watershed is within the Selkirk Mountains between the Pend Oreille River and the Columbia River. This area typically has a dry climate as a result of the Cascade Mountains to the west and the Rocky Mountains to the north and east of the watershed. These mountain ranges act as a barrier to both wet marine air and extreme cold air coming from the north. Nearly two-thirds of the total annual precipitation occurs between October and March. On average this is about 17.2 inches per year. Typical snowfall in this region is about 48 inches. Snowfall is crucial since the Colville River discharge (volume of water per unit time) relies on a snow-melt regime. The high flow period of the river occurs due to the melting of the previous winter snowpack in the spring. This combined with spring rainfall makes April usually the highest month for discharge. Just over half of this discharge comes from three tributaries of the Colville River: Chewelah Creek, Little Pend Oreille River, and Mill Creek.

History and Culture

In the beginning, the Colville River was a place of abundance. The path of the Colville River was carved by Ice Age glaciers. Mile high ice sheets coming from Canada flowed over many mountain peaks near the Colville River, leading to rounded mountain tops at lower elevations. Around 10,000 years ago the glacial ice melted, opening the way for settlement near the river. Native Americans came first around 9,000 years ago. At this time there were salmon in the river bringing Native Americans near the Colville River yearly for a first salmon ceremony. It is estimated that Native Americans caught more than 1,000 salmon a day at Kettle Falls during peak runs. By 1826, fur trappers, mostly catching beavers, moved into Fort Colville.

Pollution

The Colville River has two main point sources of pollution. They include two water waste treatment plants (WWTP): the city of Colville and the city of Chewelah. Ammonia, a toxic substance for aquatic life, has concentrations highest downstream the Chewelah and Colville WWTP discharges. In fact, modeled concentrations at the Colville WWTP mixing zone predict concentrations of ammonia and chlorine above acute water quality standards. Besides toxicity, ammonia also is a concern for dissolved oxygen content within the water. It has been demonstrated that dissolved oxygen concentrations decrease suddenly downstream from the Chewelah and Colville WWTPs in summer months. One explanation is that the excess ammonia is taken up by algae causing a decrease in dissolved oxygen content, which may harm aquatic life. The risk of these effects is greatest August through October, deemed as the critical period for the Colville River when possible physical, chemical, and biological adverse effects of a pollutant are maximized.

Current Projects

The United States Geological Survey is currently working with the Stevens County Conservation District to create a watershed plan. This plan will address water quality, quantity, and in-stream flows pertaining to the Colville River. In addition, The Lands Council from Spokane, Washington is working to relocate beavers to the Colville National Forest. Beavers are known to slow streams, create dams and lodges for improved habitats for other animals and insects, gather silt, store and cool water. The Land Council hopes these beavers will aid the Colville River's ecosystem along with other water bodies downstream.

== See also ==
- Tributaries of the Columbia River
- List of rivers of Washington (state)
