= Washington State Route 10 =

State highway in Kittitas County, Washington, US

State Route 10
- SR 10 highlighted in red

Route information
- Maintained by WSDOT
- Length: 16.16 mi (26.01 km)
- Existed: 1970–present
- Tourist routes: Swiftwater Corridor Scenic Byway

Major junctions
- West end: SR 970 in Teanaway
- East end: US 97 near Ellensburg

Location
- Country: United States
- State: Washington
- County: Kittitas

Highway system
- State highways in Washington; Interstate; US; State; Scenic; Pre-1964; 1964 renumbering; Former
← SR 9	→ SR 11

State Route 10 (SR 10) is a 16.16-mile-long (26.01 km) state highway in the U.S. state of Washington. The highway is a remnant of U.S. Route 10 (US 10) in Kittitas County, traveling southeast along the Yakima River from SR 970 in Teanaway to US 97 northwest of Ellensburg. SR 10 was established in 1970 as the successor to US 10 after the completion of I-90 across the Snoqualmie Pass in 1968. The highway was previously part of State Road 3 from 1923 to 1937 and Primary State Highway 3 (PSH 3) until the 1964 highway renumbering.

== Route description ==
SR 10 begins at an intersection with SR 970 south of DeVere Field in the unincorporated community of Teanaway in Kittitas County, southeast of Cle Elum. The highway travels southeast, parallel to a portion of the Stampede Subdivision of the BNSF Railway through the Yakima River valley and crosses over the Teanaway River before its confluence with the Yakima River. SR 10 continues southeast through Bristol and Thorp before it ends at an intersection with US 97 northwest of Ellensburg.

SR 10 retains its original mileposts from US 10. Every year, the Washington State Department of Transportation (WSDOT) conducts a series of surveys on its highways in the state to measure traffic volume. This is expressed in terms of annual average daily traffic (AADT), which is a measure of traffic volume for any average day of the year. In 2011, WSDOT calculated that 1,400 vehicles per day used the highway.

== History ==
SR 10 follows the route of the Roslyn branch of the Northern Pacific Railway, built in the Yakima River valley by the late 1890s. A roadway was built in the valley and incorporated into the Inland Empire Highway in 1913 and the Southern Division of the Sunset Highway in 1919. The highway became part of State Road 3 in 1923, which was co-signed with US 10 and US 97 during the creation of the United States Numbered Highways in 1926. State Road 3 became PSH 3 during the creation of the primary and secondary state highways in 1937, still co-signed with US 10 and US 97 through the Yakima River valley. US 10 was temporarily re-aligned over Blewett Pass in the late 1930s, leaving US 97 alone in the Yakima River valley, until US 10 was moved back to its original route in 1946 after US 2 was extended west from Idaho. During the 1964 highway renumbering, US 10 completely replaced PSH 3 as I-90 was being planned along its route. I-90 opened between Vantage and Snoqualmie Pass in November 1968 and SR 10 replaced US 10 when the state highways were codified in 1970. US 97 was moved onto former SR 131 between Thorp and Virden in 1975, leaving SR 10 without a concurrency and creating SR 970.

In the 1990s, the Washington State Transportation Improvement Board considered removing SR 10 from the state highway system, but its maintenance burden was determined to be too costly for the Kittitas County government. The highway had been in need of major repairs and safety improvements, including guardrails and wider shoulders, which the county stated that they would not be able to afford. The board recommended that in 1992 that the highway be transferred to Kittitas County with four years of financial assistance provided by the state for maintenance, but the legislature voted to keep SR 10 under state control.

== Major intersections ==
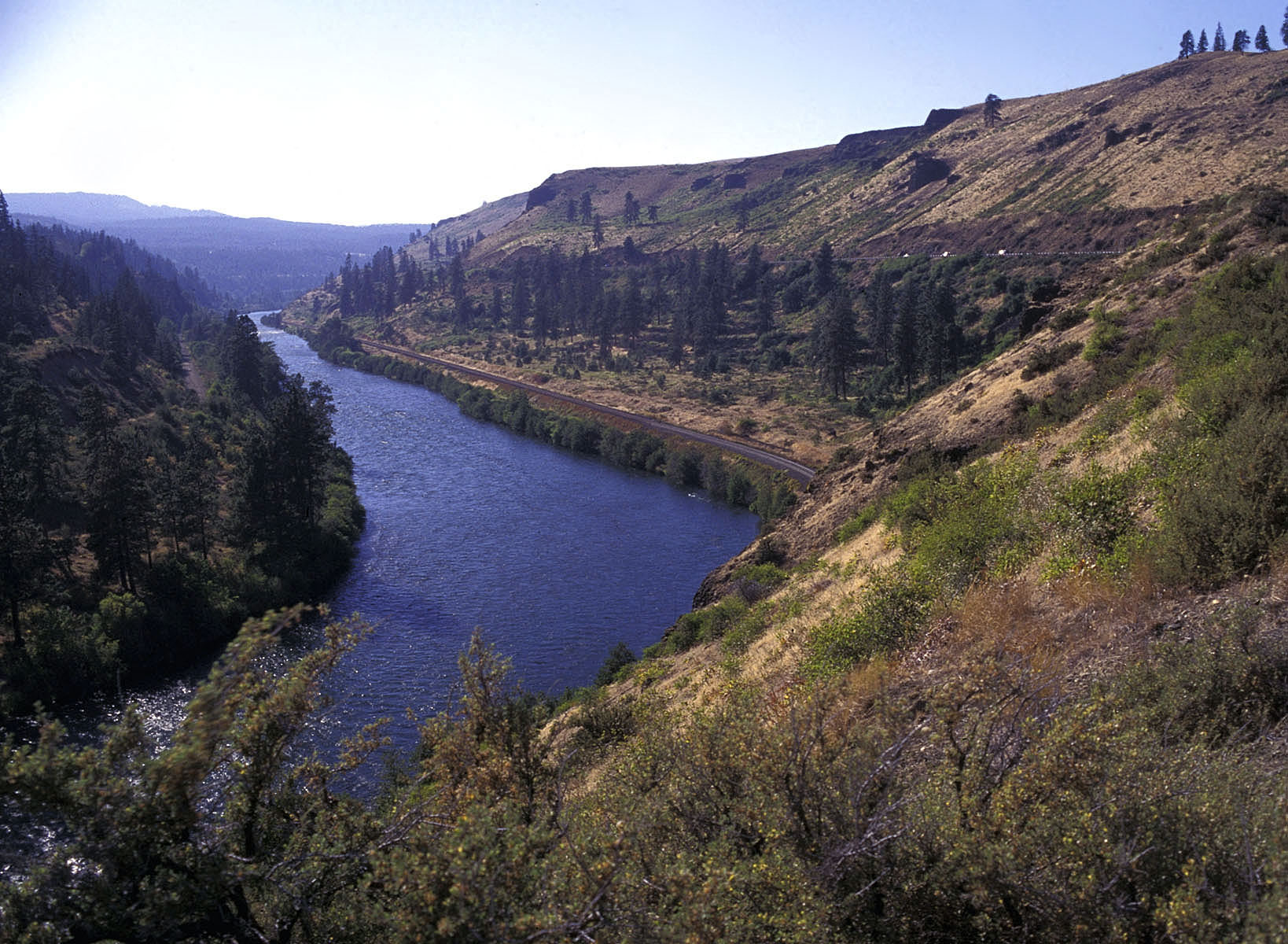
SR 10 traveling along the Yakima River near Thorp

The entire highway is in Kittitas County.

Location	mi	km	Destinations	Notes
Teanaway	0.00	0.00	SR 970 to I-90 / US 97 – Cle Elum, Seattle, Wenatchee	Western terminus
	16.16	26.01	US 97 – Ellensburg, Yakima, Wenatchee	Eastern terminus
1.000 mi = 1.609 km; 1.000 km = 0.621 mi
