= Washington State Route 903 =

State highway in Kittitas County, Washington, US

State Route 903

- A red line indicating SR 903 through Kittitas County.

Route information
- Auxiliary route of I-90
- Maintained by WSDOT
- Length: 10.06 mi (16.19 km)
- Existed: 1964–present
- Tourist routes: Swiftwater Corridor Scenic Byway

Major junctions
- South end: SR 970 near Cle Elum
- North end: Wenatchee National Forest boundary near Ronald

Location
- Country: United States
- State: Washington
- Counties: Kittitas

Highway system
- State highways in Washington; Interstate; US; State; Scenic; Pre-1964; 1964 renumbering; Former
| ← SR 902 | → SR 904 |

State Route 903 (SR 903) is a 10.06-mile-long (16.19 km) state highway located entirely in Kittitas County, Washington, United States. The highway links Lake Cle Elum to Roslyn, Cle Elum and SR 970, which provides access to Interstate 90. The highway has existed as a numbered highway since at least 1939, however a highway linking Lake Cle Elum to Cle Elum has existed since 1897. The Washington State Department of Transportation (WSDOT) had previously considered turning control of the highway over to Kittitas County, however this never happened, and WSDOT continues to maintain the highway.

== Route description ==
SR 903 begins at an intersection with SR 970 just north of the Interstate 90 (I-90) / SR 970 interchange, headed westerly into the town of Cle Elum. Before entering Cle Elum, the highway intersects its spur route, SR 903 Spur, which serves as a bypass for travelers on SR 970 who wish to avoid the main interchange of SR 903. The roadway parallels a railroad line before it terminates in South Cle Elum. The highway jogs to the north for a block before turning back west along Second Street, exiting the town and turning northwesterly. SR 903 continues through a roundabout before entering the town of Roslyn. The highway continues through town, turning southwesterly on Nevada Street, before turning back northwesterly at Seventh Street, exiting Roslyn. The highway continues through Ronald before terminating at the boundary of the Wenatchee National Forest, east of Cle Elum Lake. The roadway continues northerly however as Salmon La Sac Road.

The Washington State Department of Transportation (WSDOT) measures traffic counts, measured in terms of annual average daily traffic, with as few as 1,100 cars at the northern terminus, and as many as 7,400 cars just past the intersection at Pennsylvania Avenue in Cle Elum.

== Communities Served and Access ==
SR-903 is the sole paved road connecting the communities of Roslyn, Ronald, and Lake Cle Elum to the regional highway network. The Salmon La Sac Road, which continues beyond the northern terminus into the Wenatchee National Forest, extends access to the Salmon La Sac Campground and the upper Cle Elum River valley. During summer months, the corridor serves a substantially expanded population including visitors to Suncadia Resort (a resort and residential community located at I-90 Exit 80) and recreationists using Cle Elum Lake.

=== Traffic ===
According to the Washington State Department of Transportation's 2024 Annual Average Daily Traffic data, approximately 5,800 vehicles per day pass the Bullfrog Road roundabout at milepost 4.21 — the point north of which SR-903 serves as the sole paved access road for the communities of Roslyn, Ronald, and Lake Cle Elum. Traffic volumes decrease gradually along the upper corridor, from 4,300 vehicles per day at Roslyn to 1,300 vehicles per day at the northern terminus near the Wenatchee National Forest boundary.

== History ==
The highway was formerly SSH 2E

The current highway was numbered Secondary State Highway 2E (SSH 2E) since at least 1939, though maps show a roadway following roughly the same alignment in existence since at least 1897. During the 1964 state highway renumbering, the designation was changed from SSH 2E to SR 903. WSDOT was considering dropping SR 903 from the state highway system and turning over the highway to Kittitas County in 1992; however, the idea was quickly dropped. The roundabout at Bullfrog was first proposed in 2002, and was estimated to cost $1.2 million, paid for by Suncadia Resort. The roundabout opened to traffic sometime between May 7 and July 15, 2005. Completed in August 2007, WSDOT repaved 8.1 mi (13.0 km) of highway between Cle Elum and the National Forest boundary for a cost of $2 million.

== Major intersections ==
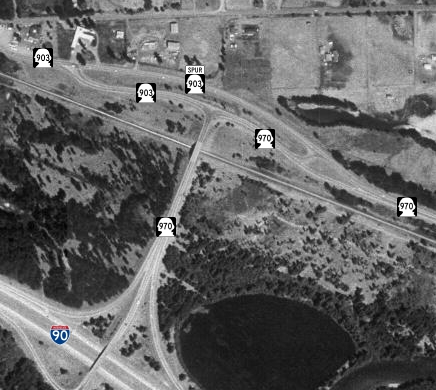
Map of the SR 903/903 Spur/970 interchange

The entire highway is in Kittitas County.

| Location | mi | km | Destinations | Notes |
|---|---|---|---|---|
| | 0.00 | 0.00 | SR 970 | At-grade intersection; southern terminus; access to I-90 via SR 970 west |
| | 0.18– 0.21 | 0.29– 0.34 | SR 903 Spur east | |
| | 10.06 | 16.19 | Wenatchee National Forest | Northern terminus; roadway continues as Salmon La Sac Road |
1.000 mi = 1.609 km; 1.000 km = 0.621 mi

== Spur route ==
State Route 903 Spur
- Location: Cle Elum
- Length: 0.33 mi (530 m)

Washington State Route 903 Spur is a 0.33-mile (530 m) long two-lane spur route of SR 903, constructed between 1973 and 1984. The spur route serves as a short connector allowing travelers on SR 970 who wish to continue west towards Cle Elum along SR 903 to bypass the main junction between SR 903 and SR 970 just north of I-90. On average, 3,000 cars-per-day travel over the spur route.
