= Ronald Washington =

Ronald Washington may refer to:

- Ron Washington (born 1952), American baseball manager
- Ronnie Washington (born 1963), American football player
- Ronald Washington, see murder of Jam Master Jay

== See also ==
- Ronald, Washington, a community in the United States
