= Swiftwater Corridor Scenic Byway =

The Swiftwater Corridor Scenic Byway is a Washington State Scenic and Recreational Highway in Kittitas County, Washington, United States. It follows five highways from the Salmon La Sac campground near Roslyn to Ellensburg:

- SR 903 from Roslyn to Cle Elum;
- SR 970 near Cle Elum;
- SR 10 from Cle Elum to Thorp;
- US 97 from Thorp to Ellensburg
