= The Nature Conservancy =

Global environmental organization

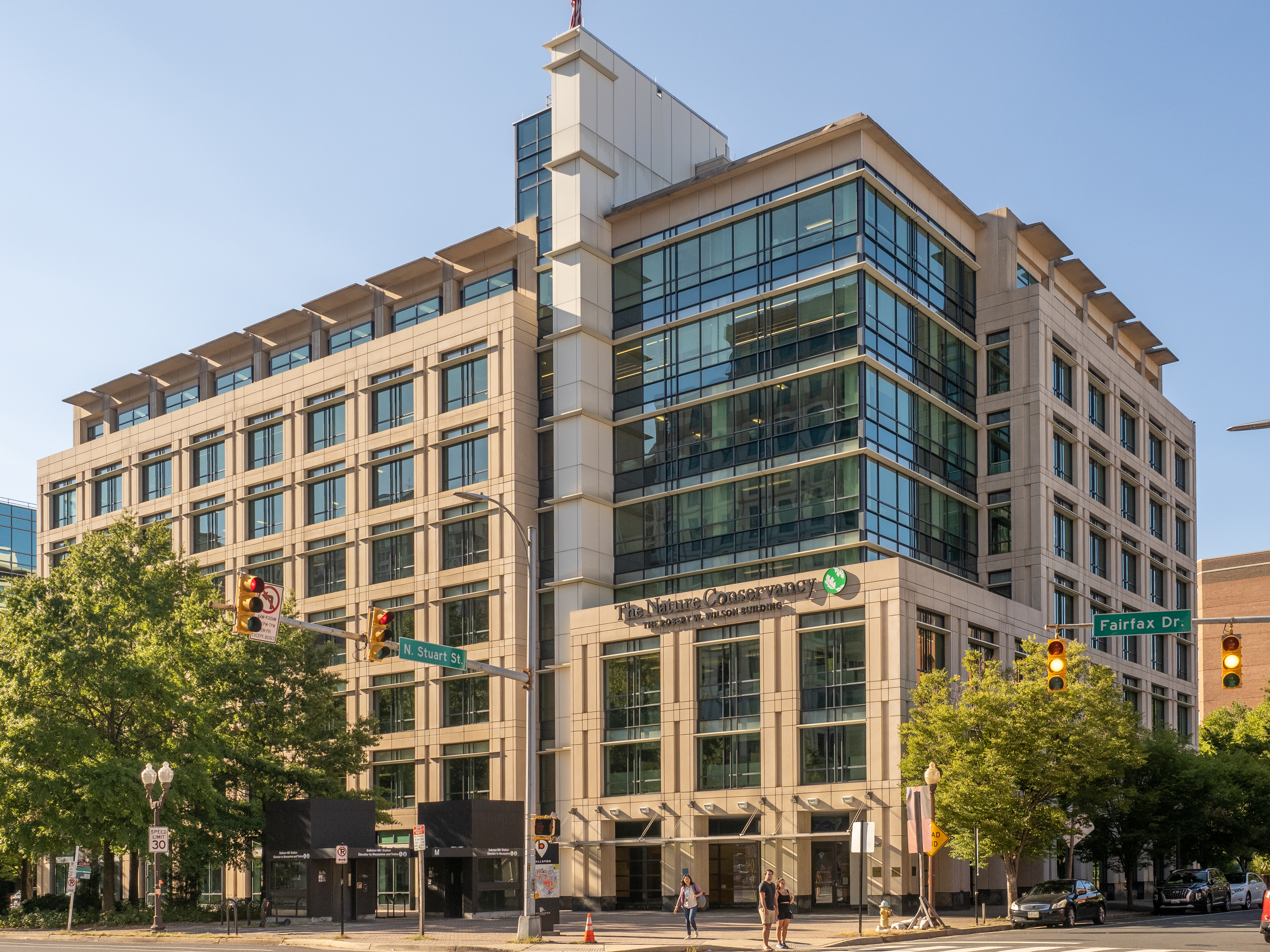
- Headquarters in Arlington, Virginia (2022)
- Founded: 1951 (75 years ago)
- Type: 501(c)(3) non-profit
- Purpose: Environmental conservation
- Headquarters: Arlington, Virginia, U.S.
- Region served: Global
- Method: Conservation by design
- Members: 1+ million
- Chief executive officer: Jennifer Morris
- Key people: Bill Frist, global board chair
- Revenue: US$2.03 billion (2025)
- Expenses: US$1.6 billion (2025)
- Endowment: US$1.72 billion (2025)
- Staff: 5,150 (2024)
- Volunteers: 14,200 (2024)
- Website: www.nature.org

The Nature Conservancy (TNC) is a global environmental organization headquartered in Arlington, Virginia, United States. As of 2021, it works via affiliates or branches in 79 countries and territories, as well as across every state in the U.S.

Founded in 1951, the Nature Conservancy has over one million members globally (as of 2021), and has protected more than 119 million acres (48 million ha) of land in its history. As of 2014, it is the largest environmental nonprofit organization by assets and revenue in the Americas.

The main goal of the Nature Conservancy is to "conserve the lands and waters on which all life depends".

== History ==
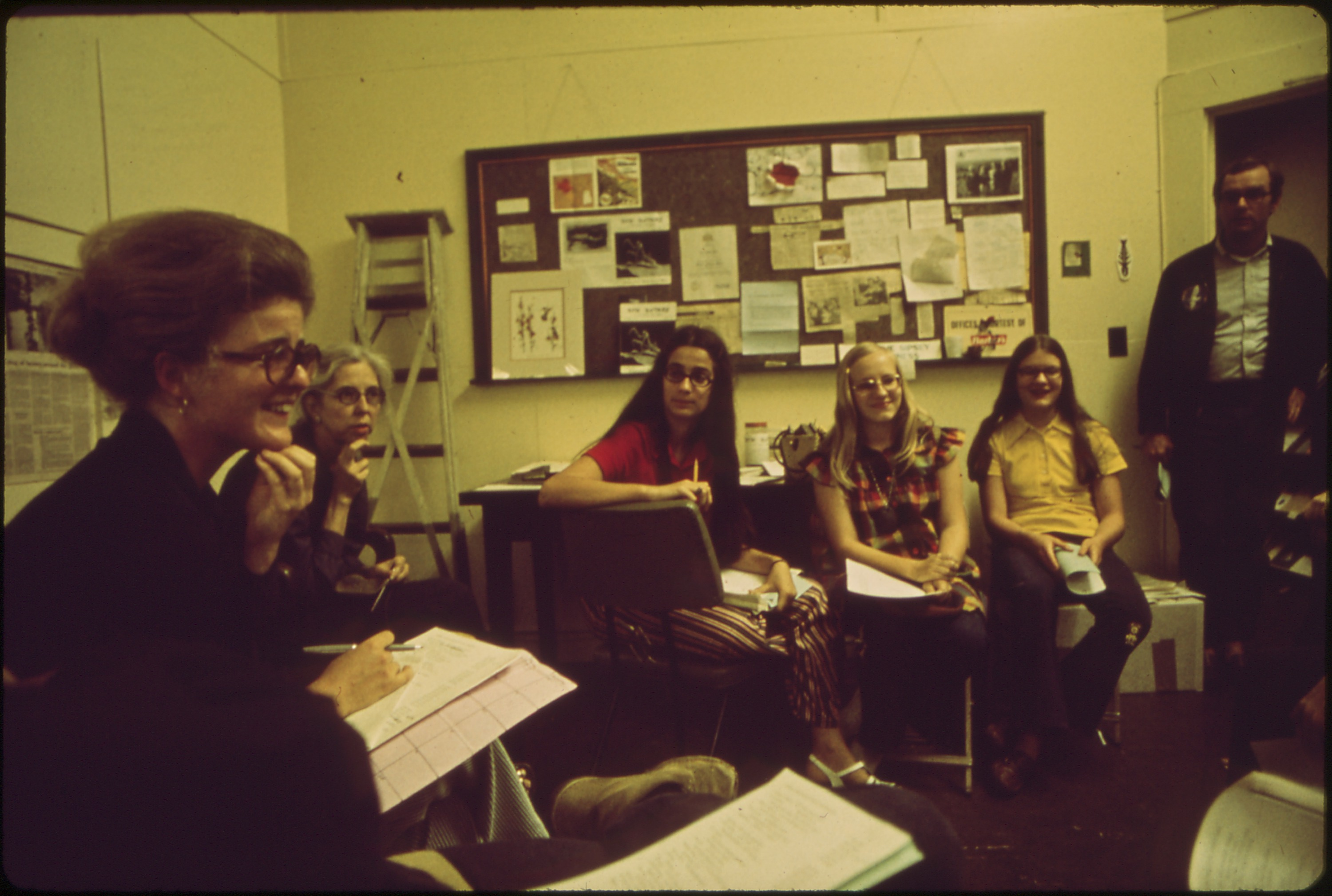
A meeting at the Alabama Nature Conservancy to organize a glass recycling effort in Birmingham, 1972

The Nature Conservancy developed out of a scholarly organization initially known as the Ecological Society of America (ESA). The ESA was founded in 1915, and later formed a Committee on Preservation of Natural Areas for Ecological Study, headed by Victor Shelford. The primary aim of Shelford was to find areas of land that would be beneficial for long-term research. By the 1930s, Shelford and his colleagues such as Aldo Leopold increasingly sought to advocate for conservation. The divide in viewpoints regarding scholarship or advocacy led the Society to dissolve the committee and in 1946, Shelford and his colleagues formed the Ecologists' Union. The latter group eventually took the name "The Nature Conservancy", in emulation of the British agency of that name, which pursued a mission of conserving open space and wildlife preserves. The Nature Conservancy was incorporated in the United States as a non-profit organization on October 22, 1951.

As the organization grew, the organization focused largely on buying as much land as possible in the name of conservation with little scientific research conducted on land before being purchased. Patrick Noonan served as president from 1973 to 1980 and spearheaded major land acquisitions, fundraising and decentralized growth of state programs. In 1970 the organization hired its first staff scientist, Robert E. Jenkins Jr., who helped the organization refocus its mission to conserving natural diversity. With Noonan's support, in 1974 Jenkins began to partner with state governments to develop state-by-state inventories which assembled and stored data on the "elements" of nature (e.g. rare species and natural communities) and on "element occurrences" (the specific locations where they occur), which later morphed into the Natural Heritage Network, a network of state natural heritage programs.

=== Sexual harassment investigation ===
After service as the Nature Conservancy's president for one year, Brian McPeek resigned on May 31, 2019, after a report on an internal investigation of sexual harassment was revealed by Politico. Two other senior executives were ultimately dismissed based on its findings. On June 7, 2019, Mark Tercek, CEO since 2008, announced his resignation following the resignation of McPeek. On June 10, Luis Solorzano, executive director of the Nature Conservancy's Florida-based Caribbean chapter, became the fifth senior official to depart the organization. On June 11, the Nature Conservancy's board chairman Thomas J. Tierney announced that board member and former US Secretary of the Interior Sally Jewell would serve as interim CEO, effective September 2019.

== Projects ==
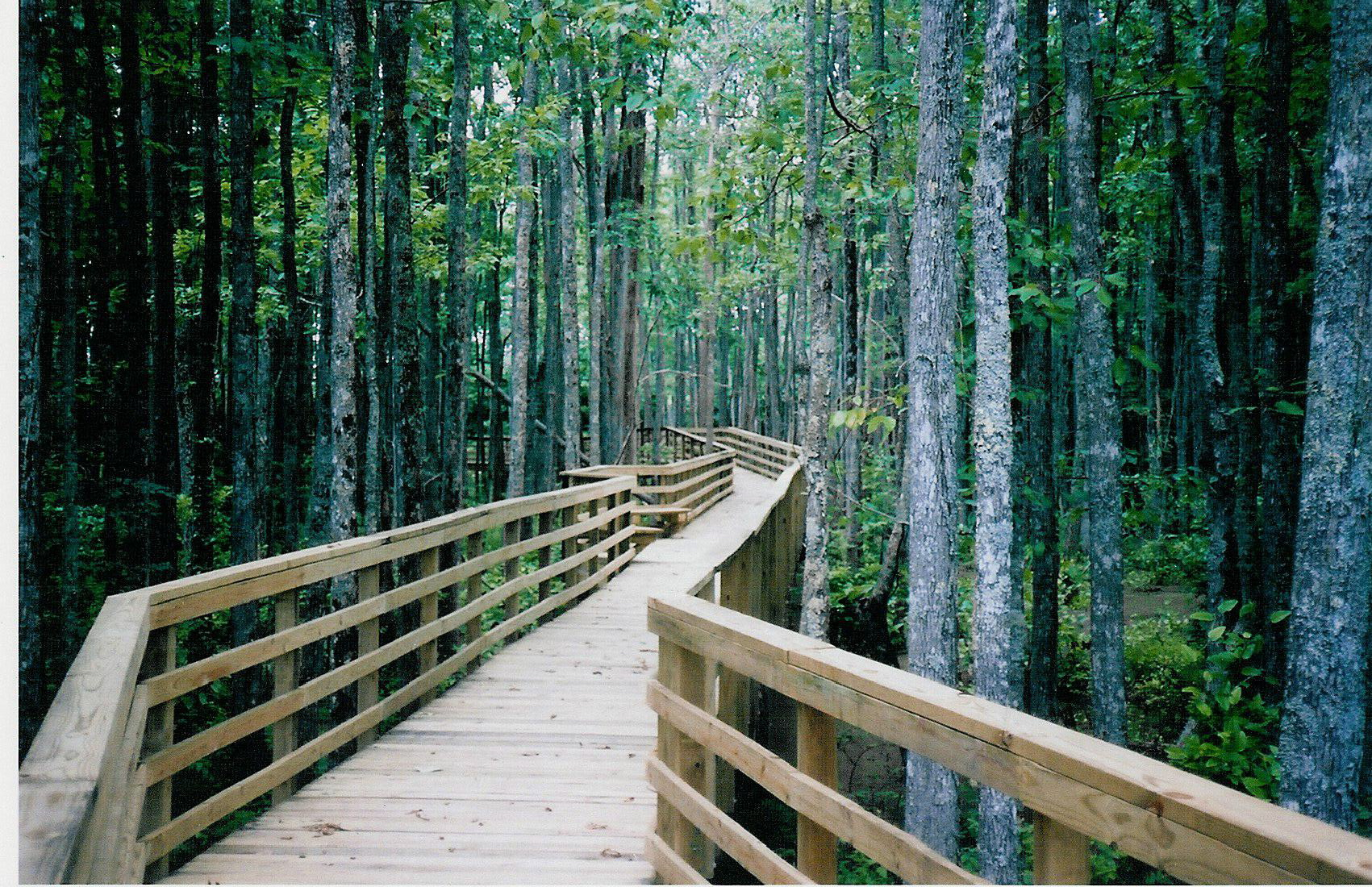
Nature Conservancy of Tennessee's William B. Clark Sr. Nature Preserve on the Wolf River at Rossville, Tennessee

External videos
- Nature's Land Brokers – documentary film highlighting project sites in Idaho (Idaho Public Television, full episode)

Clymer Meadow Preserve, managed by TNC, within the Texas Blackland Prairie eco-region

The Nature Conservancy's efforts include conservation in North America, Central America, and South America, Africa, the Pacific Rim, the Caribbean, and Asia.

=== North America: selected projects ===
The Nature Conservancy and its conservation partner, Pronatura Peninsula Yucatán, aim to halt deforestation on private lands in and around the 1.8 million acre (7,300 km^{2}) Calakmul Biosphere Reserve, along the Guatemala–Mexico border. They brokered the protection of 370,000 acres (1,500 km^{2}) of tropical forest in Calakmul. In another program, TNC is working to protect wildlife habitat in the Greater Yellowstone Ecosystem.

In 2007, the Nature Conservancy made a 161,000-acre (650 km^{2}) purchase of New York forestland from Finch Paper Holdings LLC for $110 million, its largest purchase ever in that state. In June 2008, the Nature Conservancy and The Trust for Public Land announced they reached an agreement to purchase approximately 320,000 acres (1,300 km^{2}) of western Montana forestland from Plum Creek Timber Company for $510 million. The purchase, known as the Montana Legacy Project, is part of an effort to keep these forests in productive timber management and protect the area's clean water and abundant fish and wildlife habitat, while promoting continued public access to these lands for fishing, hiking, hunting and other recreational pursuits. As a follow-on, in 2015 the Nature Conservancy made a $134 million transaction to purchase 165,073 acres (668.03 km^{2}) – of forests, rivers and wildlife habitat in the Cascade Mountain Range of Washington and in the Blackfoot River Valley in Montana. The Conservancy also acquired this land from Plum Creek, including 47,921 acres (193.93 km^{2}) in the Yakima River Headwaters in Washington and 117,152 acres (474.10 km^{2}) in the Lower Blackfoot River Watershed in Montana.

Nature United is the Canadian affiliate of the Nature Conservancy. Nature United was founded as a Canadian charity in 2014, building on decades of conservation in Canada. Headquartered in Toronto, the organization has field staff located across the country and works primarily in the Great Bear Rainforest, Clayoquot Sound, the Northwest Territories, and northern Manitoba.

=== Africa ===
In December 2015, the Nature Conservancy announced the finalization of the first ever debt swap in Seychelles aimed at ocean conservation. The new protected area increases the country's marine protected waters from less than 1 percent to more than 30 percent including support for the creation of the second largest Marine Protected Area in the Western Indian Ocean. The debt swap deal was made possible through a partnership with the Seychelles Ministry of Finance, support of debt-holding nations including France, and grants from private organizations led by the Leonardo DiCaprio Foundation.

Financing for this effort was organized by the Nature Conservancy's impact investing unit called NatureVest. NatureVest was created in 2014 with founding sponsorship from JPMorgan Chase with the stated goal of sourcing and putting to work at least $1 billion of impact investment capital for measurable conservation outcomes over three years. For their work on the Seychelles debt restructuring, the Nature Conservancy and JPMorgan Chase were given the FT/ITC Transformational Business Award for Achievement in Transformational Finance. The award is given by the Financial Times and the World Bank's International Finance Corporation (IFC) for ground-breaking, commercially viable solutions to development challenges.

=== Plant a Billion Trees campaign ===
The Nature Conservancy's "Plant a Billion Trees" campaign is an effort to plant one billion trees across the globe in forests with the greatest need and has been operating since 2008 to plant trees in Brazil, China, Colombia, Guatemala, Kenya, Tanzania, Mexico, and the United States. As part of the overall campaign, the Nature Conservancy pledged to plant 25 million trees as part of the launch of the United Nations Environment Program (UNEP)'s Billion Tree Campaign. This campaign encourages individuals and organizations to plant their own trees around the world and record this action on the website as a tally. Its "Plant a Billion Trees" campaign in Brazil aims to restore Brazil's Atlantic Forest by planting native trees on 2.5 million acres (10,000 km^{2}) that have been deforested. The Plant a Billion Trees campaign has also been identified as a tool to help slow climate change with forest restoration being an effective way to help regulate emissions in the atmosphere and stabilize global climate.

== Operations ==
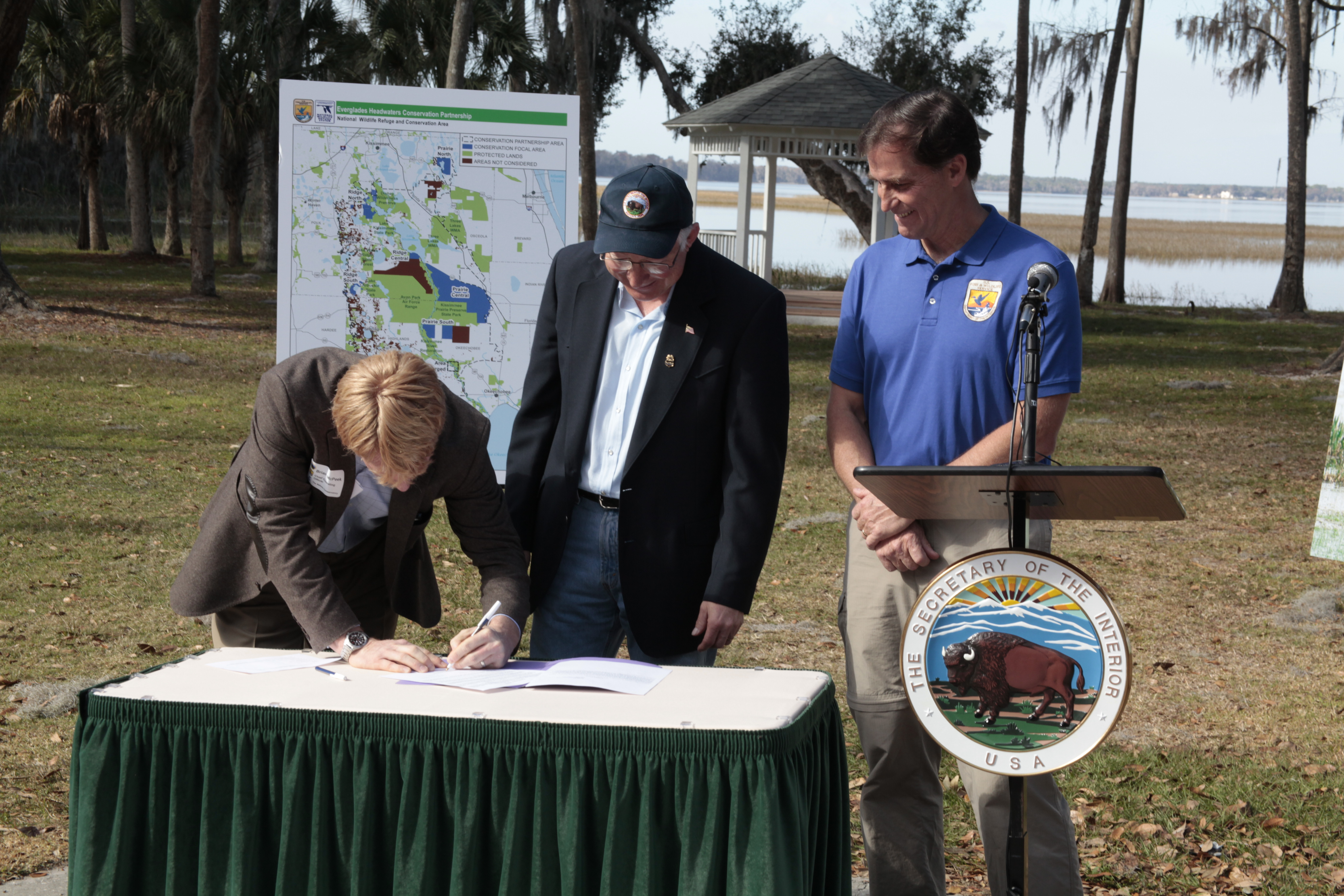
Establishing the Everglades Headwaters National Wildlife Refuge in Florida.

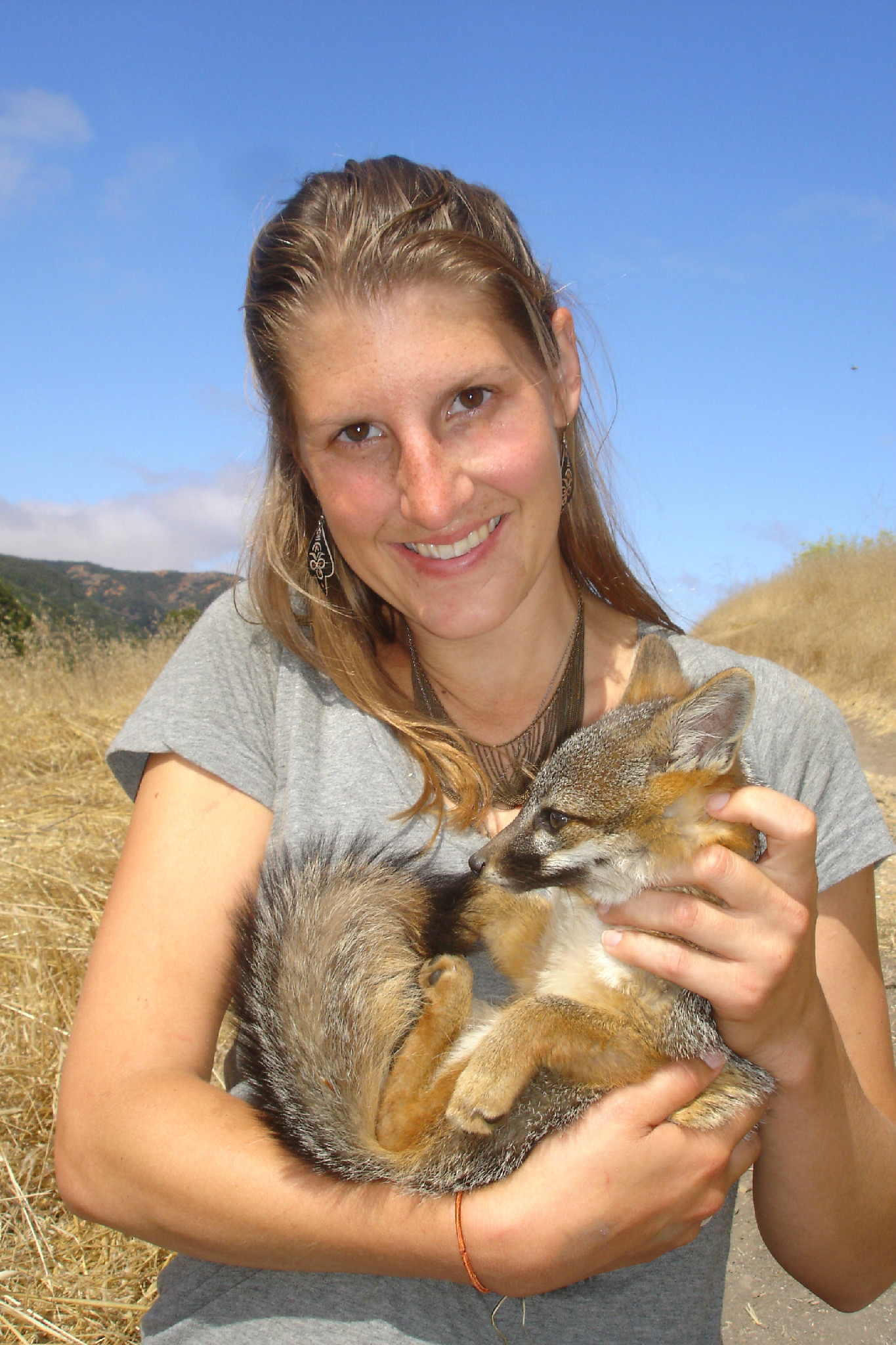
TNC staff with Urocyon littoralis, a small fox endemic to California's Channel Islands

The Nature Conservancy has over one million members across the world as of 2021. As of 2014, it was the largest environmental non-profit organization by assets and revenue in the Americas.

=== Big business ties ===
The Nature Conservancy has ties to many large companies, including those in the oil, gas, mining, chemical and agricultural industries. As of 2016, its board of directors included the retired chairman of Duke Energy, and executives from Merck, HP, Google and several financial industry groups. It also has a Business Council which it describes as a consultative forum that includes Bank of America, BP America, Chevron, Coca-Cola, Dow Chemical, Duke Energy, General Mills, Royal Dutch Shell, and Starbucks. The organization faced criticism in 2010 from supporters for its refusal to cut ties with BP after the Gulf oil spill.

In 2020, Bloomberg published an article claiming that some of the companies (such as JPMorgan Chase, Disney, and BlackRock) that purchase carbon credits from the Nature Conservancy were purchasing carbon credits for forests that did not need protection. In 2021, the Nature Conservancy partnered with Amazon to compensate local farmers for restoring and protecting rainforests in Para, Brazil. In 2022, a group of 158 conservation, environmental, and social justice non-profit organizations signed an open letter to the Conservancy's CEO, Jennifer Morris, charging that the Nature Conservancy was overly supportive of logging interests and the use of wood products as a natural climate solution. TNC is a member of the Forest Climate Working Group alongside wood product companies like Weyerhaeuser and Enviva, and other conservation organizations like the Trust for Public Land and American Forests.

==== Attwater's prairie-chicken habitat ====
In 1995, Mobil Oil Corporation donated 2300 acres in Texas to the Nature Conservancy that was intended to provide habitat for the endangered Attwater's prairie-chicken. In 1999, the Nature Conservancy permitted new oil drilling on the property, intending to use the resulting funds to support prairie chicken conservation efforts. In the view of some organizations, including the Wildlife Society, the drilling harmed the prairie-chicken population at that location. The Nature Conservancy stated several years later that it had banned new drilling or mining on its lands, but was advised that it would not legally be able to overturn the 1999 agreement which allowed a new well to be drilled.

==== Land deals controversy ====
In 2003 The Washington Post ran an investigative series about the Nature Conservancy with allegations of improper dealing and other improprieties that the Nature Conservancy contested. In part, the Post alleged the Conservancy had, time and again, bought ecologically significant tracts of land, attached some development restrictions and then resold the properties to trustees and supporters at greatly reduced prices. The sales were part of a program that limits intrusive development but generally allows buyers to build homes on the land. The buyers then gave the Conservancy cash that was roughly equivalent to the amount of the discounts. That allowed the new owners to take significant tax deductions for charitable gifts.

The Nature Conservancy suspended a range of practices shortly after the articles ran including these sales, licensing its logo to corporations whose executives sat on the Conservancy's governing board and council, all new logging and other "resource extraction activities" such as oil and gas drilling on its nature preserves, and all new loans to employees. The Conservancy launched an independent review that issued its final report in 2004, calling for sweeping reforms aimed at making the Conservancy a model of ethical standards for nonprofit organizations.

=== Efficiency and accountability ===
The Charity Navigator gave the Nature Conservancy a 4-star rating, with a score of 96%, for the 2022 fiscal year.

=== Hunting ===
In a position paper published in 2011, the Conservancy stated that it sometimes allows for hunting and fishing within its properties.

=== Publication and media ===
The organization publishes The Nature Conservancy magazine (ISSN 1540-2428; six issues per year). The organization has also appeared in a number of documentaries, including Ocean State: Rhode Island's Wild Coast, a series airing on WSBE / PBS.

== See also ==
- Climate, Community & Biodiversity Alliance
- Extractivism (trans-national corporation)
- List of environmental issues
- List of environmental organizations
- Natural capital
- Natural environment
- Natural landscape
- Natural resource
- Northwest Alliance
- Private protected area
- Sustainability
