= Northwestern Improvement Company Store =

Historic building in Roslyn, Washington

- U.S. National Register of Historic Places
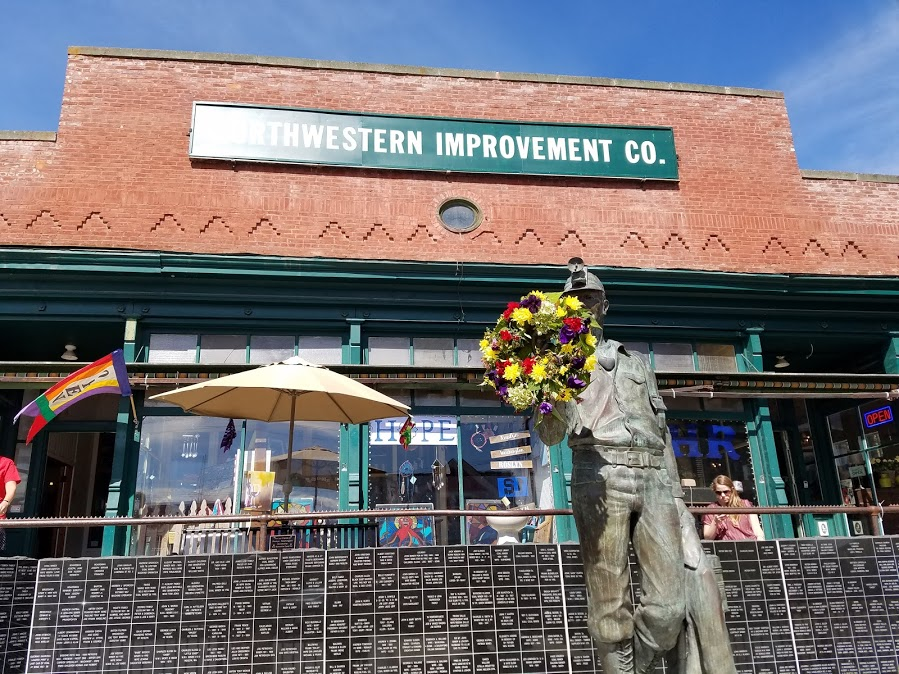
- Northwestern Improvement Company Store

- Location within Washington (state) Location within the United States
- Location: 1st St. and Pennsylvania Ave., Roslyn, Washington
- Coordinates: 47°13′25″N 120°59′29″W
- Area: 1.8 acres (0.73 ha)
- Built: 1889
- NRHP reference No.: 73001881
- Added to NRHP: April 13, 1973

Northwestern Improvement Company Store, also known as the NWI Building, is a historic building in Roslyn, Washington, the sole structure remaining from the days of the Roslyn Coal Field. It was added to the National Register of Historic Places in 1973. In the 1990s, the Northwestern Improvement Company Store building was one of the locations used in the TV series Northern Exposure.

== Description ==
Northwestern Improvement Company Store was built in 1889 of locally made red brick. The store is 284 feet (87 m) long, with an 88 feet (27 m) wide front and 52 feet (16 m) wide back. The walls are 12–15 inches (30–38 cm) thick. The ceiling in the large store portion of the building is of stamped metal. An old metal railing separates the original facade and raised sidewalk from the street. Most of the windows have cast iron shutters which were used during the period for security and fire protection.

The Roslyn Miners' Memorial, a statue and plaque engraved with the names of miners who died in the Roslyn coal mines, stands in front of Northwestern Improvement Company Store. A time capsule inside the statue will be opened in 2046.

== History ==
The store was built for the Northwestern Improvement Company, a subsidiary of the Northern Pacific Railroad, which operated coal mines on its holdings on the Roslyn–Cle Elum Ridge. Of Northwestern Improvement's three company stores—Cle Elum, Ronald, and Roslyn—the Roslyn store was the biggest and busiest. The store provided food, clothing, hardware, and services for the miners and townspeople. One section of the store provided cobbler services. A woman who grew up during the days of the mining company reminisced about the store: "It was the forerunner of today's malls all under one roof. It had a grocery store, men and women's clothes, a shoe department, yard goods and furniture." Purchases made at the company store were deducted from the miners' paychecks. A lantern would be lit in the store window when work was available.

== Current use ==
After Northwestern Improvement shut down its mining operation, the building was privately owned. In the 1990s, the Northwestern Improvement Company Store building was the set for KBHR, the radio station of fictional Cicely, Alaska, in the TV series Northern Exposure. In 2008, the building was used as a furniture store. The Roslyn Downtown Association purchased the building from a developer in 2011 with some funds contributed by the state, and has used the building for its offices, a visitors' center, public events, as well as commercial businesses. The association's renovation plans included safety and accessibility improvements.

Various businesses have operated out of the building over the years. In 2017, Heritage Distilling Company, a majority women-owned, family-operated craft distillery in Gig Harbor, opened a tasting room in the old company store building.
