= Ridge Association =

- Abbreviation: RIDGE
- Established: 1988 (37 years ago)
- Dissolved: 2014
- Types: nonprofit organization
- Location: Roslyn
- Country: United States

The Ridge Association (stylized as RIDGE) was a grassroots citizen's group based in Roslyn, Washington. The group was active from 1988 until 2014. RIDGE organized around issues related to sustainable forestry in Upper Kittitas County and Washington State. The group attempted to stop the development of the Suncadia Resort and reform logging practices on state-owned and privately owned forest land.

During its active years, RIDGE was a citizens' advisory committee for the city of Roslyn forestry issues, participated in state-wide sustainable forestry coalitions, sponsored town meetings, and took legal action to protect forest lands in the L.T. Murray Wildlife Area. RIDGE dissolved shortly after the termination of the Settlement Agreement between RIDGE and Suncadia.

== Early years ==
Upper Kittitas County residents formed RIDGE in the summer of 1988 when they realized that they shared concerns about harvest rates on forest lands in the area. Shortly after its founding, Plum Creek Timber Company announced plans to harvest 15,000 acres of sell-able timber in Kittitas County. After Plum Creek's announcement, RIDGE gathered signatures and hosted meetings in opposition to Plum Creek's logging plans from 1988 to 1989. The Washington State Land Commissioner also invited RIDGE to the Sustainable Forestry Roundtable, a state-wide forum called in which they participated.

From 1990 until 1992, RIDGE mapped, monitored, and made recommendations for forest use in Forest Practices Applications. (Note: The Washington State Department of Natural Resources uses Forest Practices Applications for "applications and notifications related to the commercial harvest of timber." The application process allows for "the public's ability to review proposed forest activities.") RIDGE asserted that these application failed to account for the accumulative logging effects on side-by-side parcels of land.

By the early 1990s, land developers were buying previously logged land parcels in Kittitas County. RIDGE took a broader focus on land use and used Washington State's newly passed Growth Management Act and other planning regulations to promote protective zoning restrictions. As a result of RIDGE's efforts, Kittitas County designated some of Plum Creek Timber Company's land for proposed development as "forestlands of long-term commercial significance". Kittitas County then removed 7,600 acres of Plum Creek Timber's land from the standard planning process.

== Suncadia lawsuit ==
In 1996, Trendwest Resorts bought land from Plum Creek Timber Company to develop the first master planned resort in the state of Washington. RIDGE was concerned about the ecological and economic effects the proposed resort might have on the area. RIDGE rallied community support for mitigations to protect Roslyn and the surrounding environment from the impacts of the resort's development. In 2001, RIDGE sued, claiming that the county failed to conduct a thorough study, and that Kittitas County would thus unduly protect Trendwest from changes in environmental law and zoning for 30 years. In July 2002, Tendwest and RIDGE negotiated then subsequently signed a settlement agreement containing protections for senior water rights for the City of Roslyn, Suncadia's purchase and donation of land to form the Roslyn Urban Forest, union labor contracts for the resort's development, a defined footprint of the resort, and more.

Between 2001 and 2006, four amendments were added to the settlement agreement to account for the resort and community's evolving development needs. RIDGE monitored and enforced the agreement during this period of time. In 2009, the resort's owners pursued legal action against RIDGE to terminate the settlement agreement—claiming that RIDGE violated terms of the agreement due to a failure to pay $50,000 for water rights, a condition of the contract. After years of litigation, Kittitas County Superior Court Judge Scott R. Sparks terminated the Settlement Agreement between RIDGE and Trendwest on July 15, 2013.

== Dissolution ==
From the mid-2000s until the termination of the RIDGE/Trendwest Settlement Agreement in 2013, RIDGE spent most of its time and resources overseeing the conditions of the agreement. After RIDGE announced its plan to forego any additional appeals. RIDGE's then-president, Douglas Kilgore, stated that despite RIDGE's belief that it could win an appeal, Suncadia's opposition to the agreement would force it back to the courts, and that "RIDGE has always sought real and function mitigation, not legal battles". RIDGE dissolved in 2014.
