= Washington State Route 970 =

State highway in Kittitas County, Washington, US

State Route 970

- SR 970 highlighted in red

Route information
- Auxiliary route of US 97
- Maintained by WSDOT
- Length: 10.31 mi (16.59 km)
- Existed: 1975–present
- Tourist routes: Swiftwater Corridor Scenic Byway

Major junctions
- West end: I-90 in Cle Elum
- SR 903 in Cle Elum; SR 10 in Teanaway
- East end: US 97 in Virden

Location
- Country: United States
- State: Washington
- Counties: Kittitas

Highway system
- State highways in Washington; Interstate; US; State; Scenic; Pre-1964; 1964 renumbering; Former
← SR 908	→ SR 971

State Route 970 (SR 970) is a 10.31-mile-long (16.59 km) state highway serving rural Kittitas County in the U.S. state of Washington. The highway connects Cle Elum to Blewett Pass and begins at an interchange with Interstate 90 (I-90) in Cle Elum. Traveling east, SR 970 intersects SR 903 north of the interchange and SR 10 in Teanaway before ending at U.S. Route 97 (US 97) in Virden. The highway was first added to the state highway system in 1909 as part of the Snoqualmie Pass Road and State Road 7. It was later signed as the Sunset Highway in 1913 and State Road 2 in 1923 before becoming part of US 97 and US 10. State Road 2 became Primary State Highway 2 (PSH 2) in 1937 and was replaced by US 97 during the 1964 highway renumbering. US 97 was realigned onto SR 131 between Thorp and Virden in 1975 and SR 970 was created on the former route.

== Route description ==
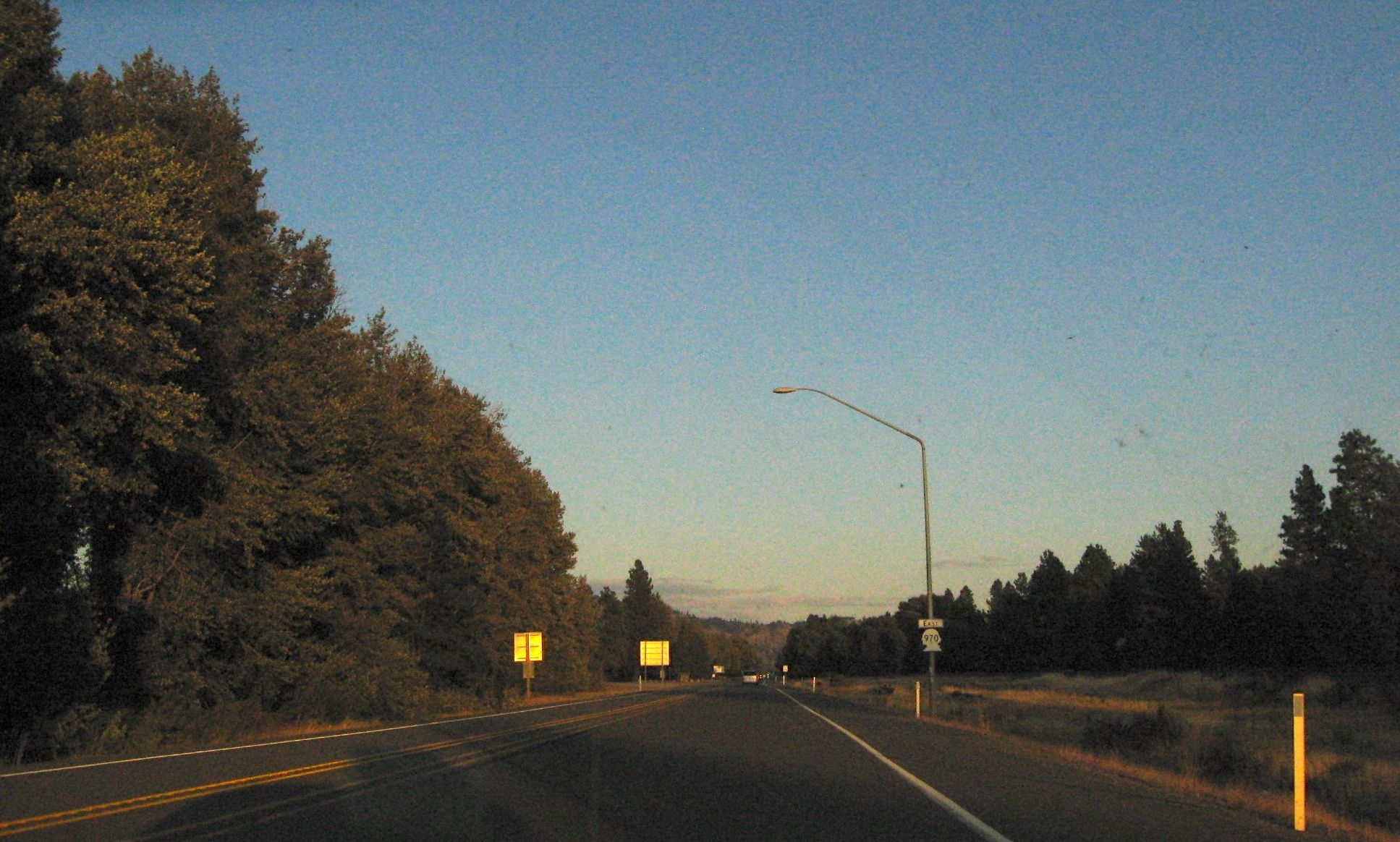
SR 970 east of its western terminus at with I-90

SR 970 begins at a diamond interchange with I-90 southeast of Cle Elum. The highway travels northeast and crosses over a BNSF rail line before intersecting SR 903, another highway that travels into Downtown Cle Elum. SR 970 turns southeast to intersect SR 903 Spur and continues out of Cle Elum and towards Teanaway, following the rail line and the Yakima River upstream. The highway intersects SR 10 south of De Vere Field and continues as a two-lane roadway northeast following the Teanaway River to Virden, also known as Lauderdale Junction, where SR 970 ends at an intersection with US 97.

Every year, the Washington State Department of Transportation (WSDOT) conducts a series of surveys on its highways in the state to measure traffic volume. This is expressed in terms of annual average daily traffic (AADT), which is a measure of traffic volume for any average day of the year. In 2011, WSDOT calculated that between 2,800 and 5,600 vehicles per day used the highway, mostly in the Cle Elum area. SR 970 is designated as a part of the National Highway System and as a Highway of Statewide Significance, which includes principal arterials that are needed to connect major communities in the state.

== History ==
A map of PSH 2 and its branches, at the time of the 1964 highway renumbering.

SR 970 was first defined under law to be built and paved by the state of Washington in 1909 as part of the Snoqualmie Pass Road, signed as State Road 7, between Snoqualmie Pass and Blewett Pass. The highway was renamed to the Sunset Highway in 1913 and became State Road 2 during a 1923 restructuring of the state highway system. State Road 2 became concurrent with US 10 from Cle Elum to Teanaway and US 97 from Cle Elum to Virden after the creation of the United States Numbered Highways in 1926. State Road 2 became PSH 2 during the creation of the Primary and secondary state highways in 1937 and US 10 was moved onto US 97 over Blewett Pass in the late 1930s. US 10 was moved to its original route in 1946 after US 2 was extended west from Idaho. After the 1964 highway renumbering, PSH 2 was removed from the highway system and replaced with US 97. US 10 was replaced with SR 10 in 1970 and US 97 was moved east on SR 131 in 1975, constructed two years prior to the realignment. SR 970 was established on the former route of US 97 in 1975 and repairs to the highway were needed immediately, with WSDOT deciding against dropping the designation from the state highway system and turning over the highway to Kittitas County in 1985. No major revisions to the route of SR 970 have occurred since 1975.

== Major intersections ==
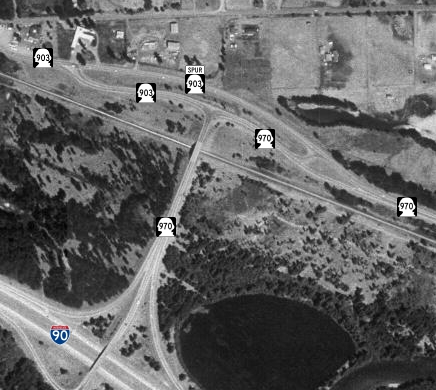
An aerial image of SR 970's western terminus at I-90, including the intersection with SR 903 and SR 903 Spur, east of Cle Elum with shields superimposed onto the respective highways.

The entire highway is in Kittitas County.

Location	mi	km	Destinations	Notes
Cle Elum	0.00– 0.24	0.00– 0.39	I-90 – Seattle, Ellensburg	Western terminus; interchange
Cle Elum	0.36	0.58	SR 903 north – Cle Elum	Southern terminus of SR 903
Cle Elum	0.51	0.82	SR 903 Spur west – Cle Elum	Eastern terminus of SR 903 Spur
Teanaway	2.69	4.33	SR 10 east – Ellensburg	Western terminus of SR 10
Virden	10.31	16.59	US 97 – Wenatchee, Ellensburg	Eastern terminus
1.000 mi = 1.609 km; 1.000 km = 0.621 mi
