= Burlington Resources =

Burlington Resources Inc.
- Industry: Petroleum industry
- Founded: 1988; 38 years ago
- Defunct: March 31, 2006; 20 years ago
- Fate: Acquired by ConocoPhillips
- Headquarters: Houston, Texas
- Key people: Bobby S. Shackouls, President & CEO
- Revenue: ▲$7.587 billion (2005)
- Net income: ▲$2.710 billion (2005)
- Total assets: ▲$19.225 billion (2005)
- Total equity: ▲$8.935 billion (2005)
- Number of employees: 2,416 (2005)

Burlington Resources Inc. was a company engaged in hydrocarbon exploration. In 2006, the company was acquired by ConocoPhillips.

== History ==
In 1988, the company was formed to own the resource assets of Burlington Northern Railroad. The company became a public company.

In 1989, the company spun off Plum Creek Timber.

In 1997, the company acquired Louisiana Land & Exploration, gaining interest in properties in the Gulf of Mexico.

In 1999, the company acquired Poco Petroleums, gaining properties in the Western Canadian Sedimentary Basin. The company also acquired ARCO's operations in Ecuador.

In 2001, the company acquired Canadian Hunter Exploration, expanding its base in Canada.

In 2003, the company started production in Algeria.

In 2004, the company received approval to develop a gas field in China.

In 2006, the company was acquired by ConocoPhillips.
