= Montana Legacy Project =

Purchase of land in Montana for conservation

- Formation: 2008
- Founder: The Nature Conservancy, The Trust for Public Land
- Purpose: Conservation
- Region served: Northwestern Montana
- Website: nature.org (archived)

The Montana Legacy Project is a three-phase purchase of more than 310,000 acres (1,300 km^{2}) of land owned by Plum Creek Timber in northwestern Montana for conservation protection. The land is within the counties of Missoula, Mineral, Lake and Powell.

The land is within the Swan Valley, the upper Clearwater Valley near Seeley Lake, the Lolo Creek watershed, the Mill Creek area near the city of Missoula, Fish Creek, Petty Creek, Schwartz Creek, and in the Garnet Mountains between Potomac and Interstate 90.

The land will be managed more for public recreation, sustainable forestry and as wildlife habitat.

The Nature Conservancy and The Trust for Public Land were asked to complete the purchase for a combined total price of $510 million, although the Project has revised this figure to $490 million. The first phase was purchased in December 2008, the second in February 2009 and the third was scheduled for December 2010. The U.S. Federal Government appropriated $500 million to facilitate the purchase.

== Financing ==
The project has been primarily funded through Qualified Forestry Conservation Bonds – a public financing mechanism created in the 2008 Farm Bill under the leadership of Montana Senator Max Baucus. The program enabled The Nature Conservancy and The Trust for Public Land to purchase forest lands either through the issuance of tax credit bonds or through direct federal grants. The bond program, however, contained such stringent project requirements that it was in fact only available to the Montana Legacy Project lands; the projects had to involve at least 40,000 acres (160 km^{2}) of land that partially bordered National Park land and that was subject to a native fish habitat conservation plan.

The Nature Conservancy and The Trust for Public Land, as 501(c)(3) charities, were made eligible to issue up to $500,000,000 of Qualified Forestry Conservation Bonds. This entitled them to a direct payment of $250,000,000 from the U.S. Federal Government:

without regard to whether the issuer is subject to tax under Chapter 1 of the Code, the issuer may elect to be treated as having made a payment against that tax ... in an amount equal to 50 percent of the amount of the allocation. Under section 54B(h)(2)(A), the Secretary shall not use the deemed payment of tax as an offset or credit against any tax liability of the issuer but shall refund the deemed payment to the issuer.

John Boehner, while House Minority Leader, lambasted the bond program for disguising as a new tax conservation credit an earmark for Senator Baucus' home state.

== Timeline ==
=== 2008 ===
- May 23: In a joint press conference with Senator Max Baucus, Plum Creek Timber announces that it is close to a sale of a full quarter of the company's 1,200,000 acres (4,900 km^{2}) of land in Montana.
- June 30: Announcement of the Project; "Plum Creek is selling 223,400 acres in Missoula County, and 35,500 acres in the Swan Valley, along with 13,800 acres in Lincoln County."
- July 24: Robert Rasmussen of the Trust for Public Land says that some of the land will be resold to Timberland Investment Management Organizations ("TIMOs"), and "To that end, part of the agreement stipulates that TNC and TPL will sell to Plum Creek at market value a certain number of board feet, logged from lands they choose, over the next 10 to 15 years."
- August 1: Local residents at public meeting express concern over lack of details.
- October 20: Montana Legacy Project announces "Working Forest" Agreement, with the goal of providing steady inputs for Plum Creek lumber mills estimated at 92 million board feet. "A key to the deal was the promise of a steady timber supply for Plum Creek mills over the next 10 years."
- December 19: Phase I of Montana Legacy Project completed. The Nature Conservancy and the Trust for Public Land purchase nearly 130,000 acres (530 km^{2}) of Plum Creek land west of Missoula County in the Fish Creek area of Mineral County, and east of Missoula County in the Potomac Valley. The price is $150 million. Plum Creek will continue to have timber harvesting rights.

=== 2009 ===
- January 31: Phase II purchase, originally scheduled to close during December, 2009, now expected to close seven months earlier in February 2009. Total project transaction now valued at $489 million, a reduction of $21 million.
- February 2: During Plum Creek earnings call, the company announces the completion of Phase I, which valued the companies' lands in western Montana at $1,600 an acre.
- February 17: The Nature Conservancy and Trust for Public Land announce the completion of Phase II purchase of 111,740 acres (452.2 km^{2}) of western Montana forestland from Plum Creek for $250 million.
- February 18: The Flathead Beacon publishes criticism alleging that the Federal Government, through TNC and TPL, vastly overpaid for the Phase II purchase.

=== 2010 ===
- February 3: Montana Department of Fish, Wildlife and Parks ("FWP") announces "Fish Creek Project", plan to purchase 41,000 acres (170 km^{2}) of fire-damaged former Plum Creek land in Mineral County for $14 million from The Nature Conservancy.
- March 10: The Nature Conservancy raises the Fish Creek price by more than $3 million, to $17.35 million. The Montana FWP Commission approves the purchase the next day.
- March 15: Phase II Concludes, Transfers 122,000 Acres to Forest Service.

== See also ==
- Flora of Montana
- Natural history of Montana
- Protected areas of Montana
