= List of Washington State Scenic and Recreational Highways =

Washington State Scenic and Recreational Highways
- Highway marker for the program

System information
- Maintained by WSDOT
- Formed: April 27, 1967
- Notes: Defined by RCW 47.39

Highway names
- Interstates: Interstate nn (I-nn)
- US Highways: U.S. Route nn (US nn)
- State: State Route nn (SR nn)

System links
- State highways in Washington; Interstate; US; State; Scenic; Pre-1964; 1964 renumbering; Former

The Washington State Scenic and Recreational Highways program is a system of scenic routes in the U.S. state of Washington.

== History ==
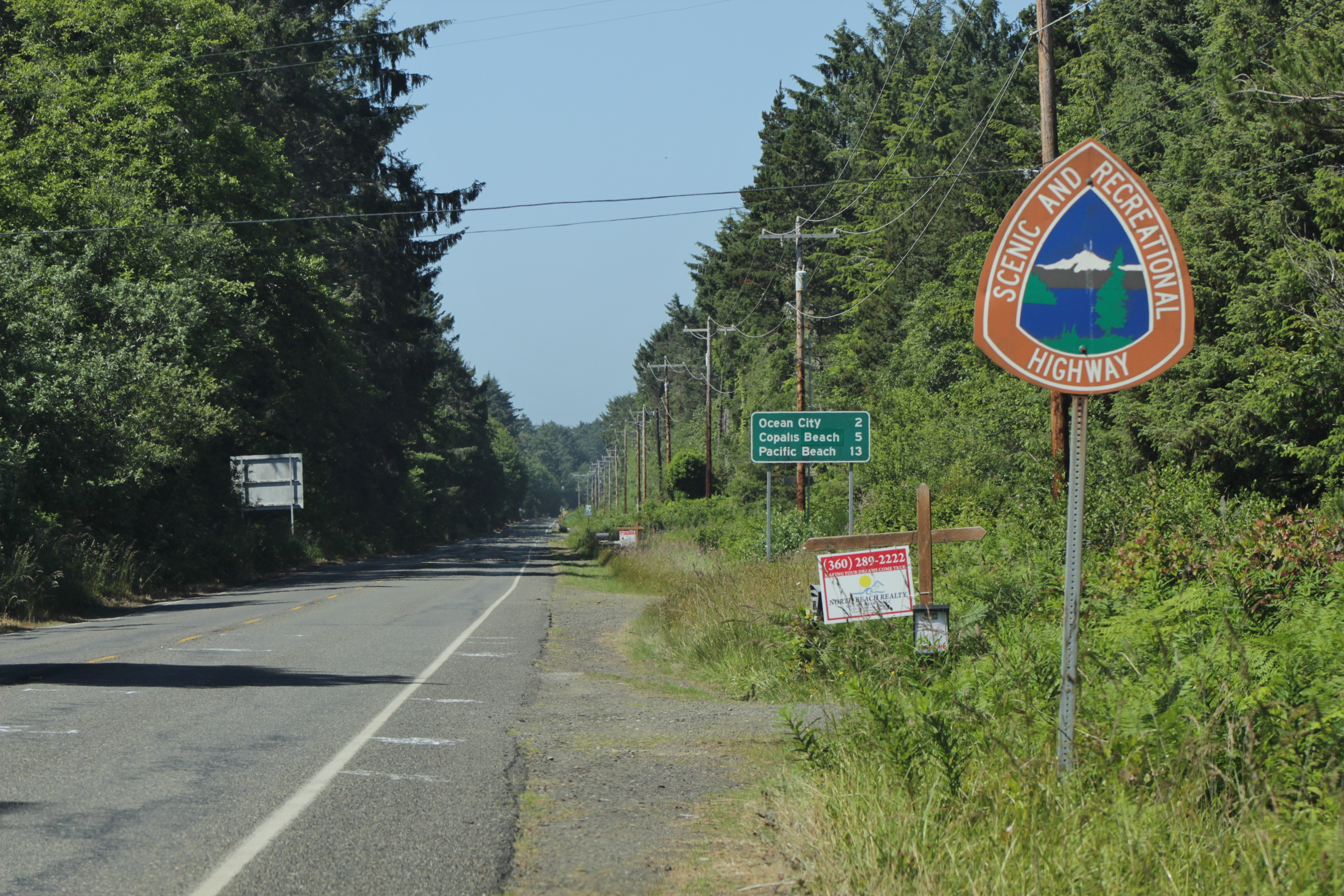
A Scenic and Recreational Highway shield on SR 109 near Hoquiam

The passage of the Scenic and Recreational Highway Act of 1967, signed into law on April 27, 1967, established Washington's state scenic and recreational highway program.

== State byways ==
Key
†	Also designated as a National Scenic Byway
‡	Also designated as an All-American Road
§	Also designated as a National Forest Scenic Byway

List of Washington State Scenic and Recreational Highways
Name	Length (mi)	Length (km)	Southern or western terminus	Northern or eastern terminus	Designated	Description
Cape Flattery Tribal Scenic Byway	12	19	Cape Flattery	Eastern Makah reservation limits		Follows Bayview Avenue and SR 112 through the Makah Indian Reservation
Cascade Loop Scenic Byway †	440	710	Loop in Snohomish, King, Chelan, Okanogan, Skagit, Whatcom and Island County counties			Follows US 2, US 97 Alternate, US 97, SR 153, SR 20, SR 525, SR 526 and I-5 around the North Cascades
Cascade Valleys Scenic Byway	28	45	SR 522 in Woodinville	I-90 in North Bend	1993	Follows SR 202 along the Sammamish and Snoqualmie rivers
Chuckanut Drive Scenic Byway	21	34	I-5 in Burlington	I-5 in Bellingham	1993	Follows SR 11 through the Chuckanut Mountains
Columbia River Gorge Scenic Byway	80	130	Eastern Washougal city limits	US 97 in Maryhill	1967	Follows SR 14 through the Columbia River Gorge National Scenic Area
Cranberry Coast Scenic Byway	48	77	US 101 in Raymond	US 101 in Aberdeen	1967	Follows SR 105 along Willapa Bay, the Pacific Ocean, and Grays Harbor
Hidden Coast Scenic Byway	41	66	US 101 in Hoquiam	Cuitan Street in Taholah	1967	Follows SR 109 along the Pacific Coast
Lewis and Clark Trail Scenic Byway	572	921	Leadbetter Point State Park (north branch); Cape Disappointment State Park (south branch)	US-12 at Idaho state line in Clarkston	1967	Follows SR 103, SR 100, US 101, SR 401, SR 4, SR 432, I-5, SR 14, I-82, US 395, I-182, US 12 and SR 124 along the Columbia and Snake rivers
Mount Baker Scenic Byway	58	93	I-5 in Bellingham	Artist Point, Mt. Baker Ski Area	1967	Follows SR 542 to Mount Baker
North Cascades Scenic Byway	140	230	SR 9 in Sedro-Woolley	SR 153 in Twisp		Follows SR 20 through North Cascades National Park
North Pend Oreille Scenic Byway †	27	43	SR 20 in Tiger	BC 6 at Canada–US border		Follows SR 31 in Pend Oreille County; also designated as part of the International Selkirk Loop
Okanogan Trails Scenic Byway	83	134	SR 153 in Pateros	BC 97 at Canada–US border		Follows US 97 along the Okanogan River
Pacific Coast Scenic Byway †	350	560	US 101 at Oregon state line near Megler	I-5 in Olympia		Follows US 101 around the Olympic Peninsula
Palouse Scenic Byway	208	335	Adams–Whitman county line	Idaho state line	2003	Follows SR 26, SR 27, SR 194, US 195, SR 271, SR 272 and SR 278 in Whitman County
San Juan Islands Scenic Byway	120	190 (Note: The San Juan Islands Scenic Byway includes a 30-mile (48 km) ferry route operated by Washington State Ferries between the islands.)	Sidney, British Columbia	SR 20 near Anacortes	2009	Follows SR 20 Spur (San Juan Islands Ferry) through the San Juan Islands
Sherman Pass Scenic Byway	35	56	SR 21 in Republic	US 395 in Kettle Falls		Follows SR 20 through Sherman Pass
Spirit Lake Memorial Highway §	52	84	I-5 in Castle Rock	Johnston Ridge Observatory		Follows SR 504 towards Mount St. Helens; also designated as a National Forest Scenic Byway
Swiftwater Corridor Scenic Byway	42	68	Wenatchee National Forest boundary	I-90 in Ellensburg		Follows SR 10, US 97, SR 903 and SR 970 in Kittitas County
Whidbey Scenic Isle Way	54	87	Clinton ferry terminal	Deception Pass		Follows SR 525 and SR 20 on Whidbey Island
White Pass Scenic Byway §	119	192	I-5 near Napavine	SR 410 in Naches		Follows US 12 through White Pass; also designated as a National Forest Scenic Byway
Yakima Scenic Byway	76	122	SR 14 in Maryhill	I-82/US 12 in Union Gap		Follows US 97 through the Yakama Indian Reservation
Yakima River Canyon Scenic Byway	18	29	I-82 in Selah	I-82 in Ellensburg		Follows SR 821 through the Yakima River Canyon

=== Agricultural scenic corridors ===
Name	Length (mi)	Length (km)	Southern or western terminus	Northern or eastern terminus	Designated	Description
Skagit Valley Agricultural Scenic Corridor	18	29	Starbird Road near Conway	Bow Hill Road near Bow	2010	Follows I-5 through the Skagit Valley

=== Former byways ===
- State Route 901 (removed in 1992)

== National byways ==
In addition to the state scenic highways system, several routes in Washington are designated as National Scenic Byways and All-American Roads.

- Cascade Loop National Scenic Byway (2021)
- Chinook Scenic Byway (1998), an All-American Road
- Coulee Corridor Scenic Byway (2005)
- International Selkirk Loop (2005), an All-American Road
- Mountains to Sound Greenway (1998)
- Pacific Coast Scenic Byway (1998), an All-American Road since 2002
- Stevens Pass Greenway (2005)
- Strait of Juan de Fuca Highway (2000)
