= Teanaway, Washington =

Unincorporated community in Washington, US

- Unincorporated community
- Location within Washington (state) Location within the United States
- Coordinates: 47°10′29″N 120°51′27″W
- Country: United States
- State: Washington
- County: Kittitas
- Time zone: UTC-8 (Pacific (PST))
  - Summer (DST): UTC-7 (PDT)
- Area code: 509
- GNIS feature ID: 1526962

Teanaway is an unincorporated community in Kittitas County, Washington. It is located at the junction of State Route 10 and State Route 970. It is located east of Cle Elum and west of Ellensburg. The surrounding area is known as the Teanaway River Valley.

== History ==
The Teanaway River Valley was first inhabited by members of the Yakama, Cayous, and Nez Perce Indian Tribes. It was part of the summering grounds for these tribes, where they came to gather food.

Teanaway was platted in 1885.

== Geography and climate ==
The Teanaway River Valley is home to the Teanaway River, which has three forks: the North Fork, Middle Fork, and West Fork. The Teanaway River Valley is separated from the town of Cle Elum by Cle Elum Ridge.

Teanaway is home to one of the few confirmed wild wolf populations in the State of Washington.

Like all of Eastern Washington, the Teanaway Valley sits in the rain shadow of the Cascade Mountains. Most overcast conditions to the west don't make it over, leaving this area sunnier than those areas to the west. The area is also subject to temperatures that are colder in the winter, and warmer in the summer, than those areas to the west (such as Seattle), and is also drier.

Climate data for Teanaway, Washington
Month	Jan	Feb	Mar	Apr	May	Jun	Jul	Aug	Sep	Oct	Nov	Dec	Year
Record high °F (°C)	65 (18)	69 (21)	95 (35)	96 (36)	99 (37)	100 (38)	105 (41)	105 (41)	98 (37)	96 (36)	68 (20)	66 (19)	105 (41)
Mean daily maximum °F (°C)	36 (2)	41 (5)	50 (10)	58 (14)	66 (19)	72 (22)	80 (27)	81 (27)	73 (23)	60 (16)	43 (6)	35 (2)	58 (14)
Mean daily minimum °F (°C)	22 (−6)	25 (−4)	29 (−2)	34 (1)	41 (5)	48 (9)	53 (12)	52 (11)	43 (6)	34 (1)	30 (−1)	23 (−5)	36 (2)
Record low °F (°C)	−33 (−36)	−30 (−34)	0 (−18)	12 (−11)	19 (−7)	26 (−3)	30 (−1)	30 (−1)	21 (−6)	10 (−12)	−14 (−26)	−31 (−35)	−33 (−36)
Average precipitation inches (mm)	3.85 (98)	2.57 (65)	1.67 (42)	1.15 (29)	0.94 (24)	0.97 (25)	0.45 (11)	0.57 (14)	0.93 (24)	1.73 (44)	3.90 (99)	4.11 (104)	22.84 (579)

== Economy ==
A large solar plant was planned for the Teanaway area. The project has since been cancelled.

== Transport ==
Highway 10 and highway 970 meet in Teanaway. Highway 970 runs through the valley.

Teanaway is served by a small airfield, DeVere Field.
