= Suncadia, Washington =

Unincorporated community in Washington, US

- Unincorporated community
- Location within Washington (state) Location within the United States
- Coordinates: 47°12′36″N 121°00′25″W
- Country: United States
- State: Washington
- County: Kittitas
- Time zone: UTC-8 (Pacific (PST))
  - Summer (DST): UTC-7 (PDT)
- Area code: 509

Suncadia is an unincorporated community and resort in Kittitas County, Washington, covering an area of 6,300 acres (25.5 km^{2}). It is located approximately 80 miles (130 km) east of Seattle in the Cascade Mountains between Roslyn, Cle Elum, and the Mountains to Sound Greenway section of Interstate 90.

The resort was a joint undertaking between Jeld-Wen and managing partner Lowe Enterprises. The $1 billion project featured a 4-star rated mountain lodge with convention center facilities, a mountain springs themed spa, a sports center with indoor and outdoor swimming pools, an outdoor venue amphitheater/lake with winter ice skating, trails and recreational areas, 2,000 residential units, and three golf courses.

The resort is also home to Swiftwater Cellars, a destination winery.

Suncadia Social, a village center with retail, residential, dining, and a full service grocery store is scheduled to open in June 2026.

Over 500 single-family homesites were sold in 2004, generating more than $125 million in gross revenue.

The community's open space includes a 1,200-acre (4.9 km^{2}) corridor along the Cle Elum River, which remains open to the public under a partnership (called the Suncadia Conservancy) that also includes Washington's Department of Fish and Wildlife and the Yakama Nation. The interests of local citizens in aspects of the development that included the corridor were represented by RIDGE, a grassroots group.

Suncadia, originally called "MountainStar," was built on former forest lands purchased in 1996 from Plum Creek Timber Company by Jeld-Wen's Trendwest Investments.
