= Roslyn, Washington =

- City
- Downtown Roslyn

- Location of Roslyn, Washington
- Coordinates: 47°14′45″N 121°06′25″W
- Country: United States
- State: Washington
- County: Kittitas

Government
  - Type: Mayor–council
  - Mayor: Jeff Adams

Area
  - Total: 4.39 sq mi (11.37 km^{2})
  - Land: 4.39 sq mi (11.37 km^{2})
  - Water: 0 sq mi (0.00 km^{2})
- Elevation: 3,406 ft (1,038 m)

Population (2020)
  - Total: 950
  - Density: 220/sq mi (84/km^{2})
- Time zone: UTC-8 (Pacific (PST))
  - Summer (DST): UTC-7 (PDT)
- ZIP code: 98941
- Area code: 509
- FIPS code: 53-60055
- GNIS feature ID: 2411001
- Website: City of Roslyn

Roslyn is a city in Kittitas County, Washington, United States. The population was 950 at the 2020 census. Roslyn is located in the Cascade Mountains, about 80 miles east of Seattle. The town was founded in 1886 as a coal mining company town. During the 20th century, the town gradually transitioned away from coal, and today its economy is primarily based on forestry and tourism. The town was the filming location for The Runner Stumbles, Northern Exposure, and The Man in the High Castle. Many of the town's historical structures have been preserved, and its downtown was added to the National Register of Historic Places in 1978.

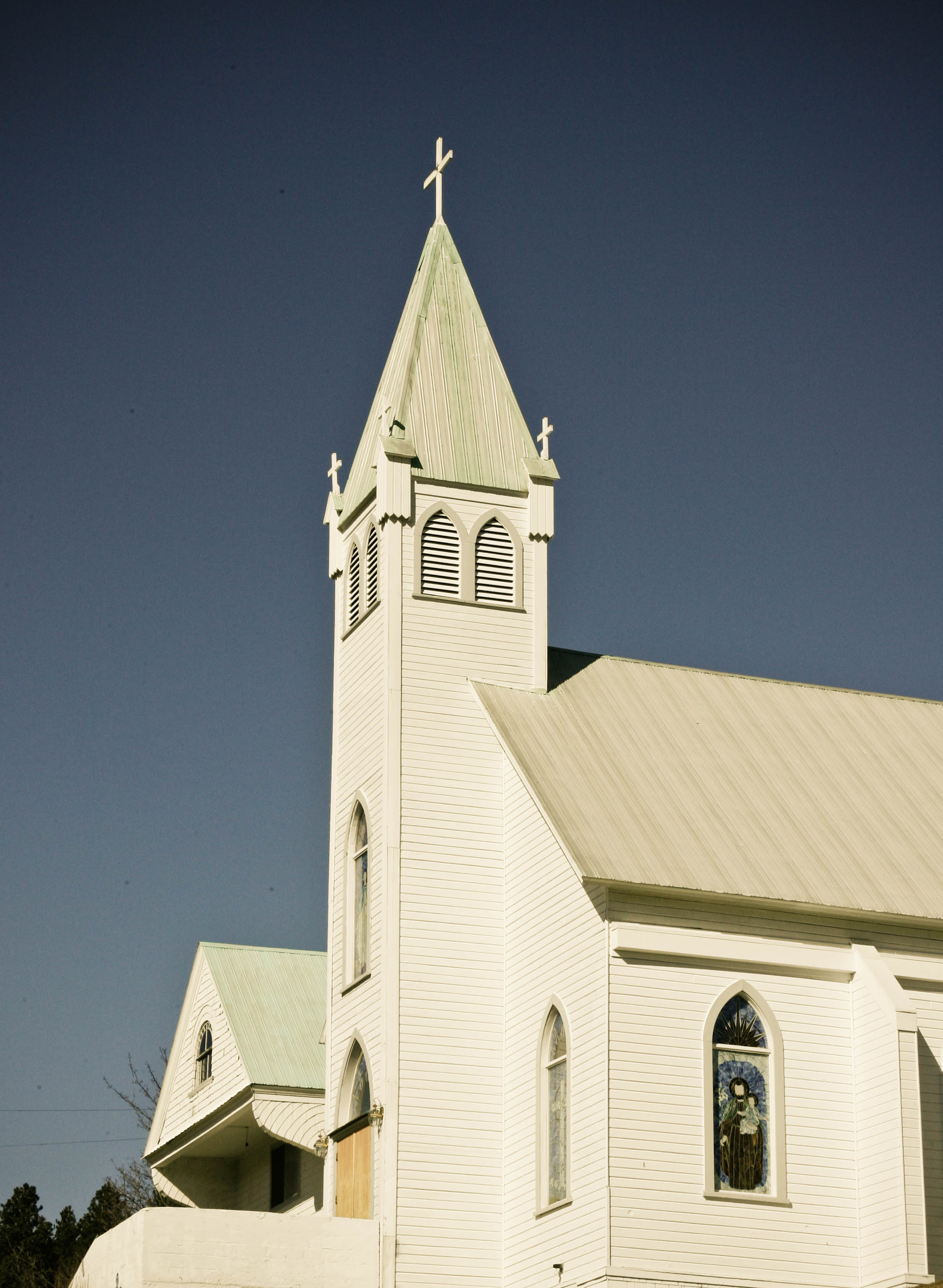
Immaculate Conception Church is featured in the 1979 film The Runner Stumbles, starring Dick Van Dyke and Kathleen Quinlan.

== History ==
=== Early history ===
Coal deposits were first noted in the Roslyn area in 1883, with a large vein discovered at the upper Smith Creek canyon in 1885 by C.P. Brosious, Walter J. Reed, and Ignatius A. Navarre. Roslyn was platted in 1886 by Logan M. Bullet, vice president of the Northern Pacific Coal Company, at the time that the company initiated the first commercial coal mining operations there, to support railway operations.

Throughout the mid-1880s, the Northern Pacific Railway, the parent of Northern Pacific Coal Company, pushed from the east to reach Puget Sound across the Cascade Mountains. The Northern Pacific began building across Stampede Pass just west of Roslyn, approaching from Wallula in the east and Tacoma in the west. A 77-mile (124-km) gap remained in 1886. In January of that year, Nelson Bennett was given a contract to construct a 9,850 foot (3,002 m) tunnel under Stampede Pass, completing it in 1888. Roslyn, which lies on the route to Stampede Pass, provided the coal for the railway construction work as well as the continuing railroad operations.

Between 1886 and 1929, immigrant workers from countries such as Italy, Poland, Slovakia, Germany, Lithuania, Slovenia, Serbia and Croatia as well as from England, Ireland, Scotland and Wales came to work in the mines.

In 1892, 45 miners were killed in an explosion at Mine No. 1 near Roslyn, the deadliest mining accident in Washington history.

Roslyn's peak coal mine production of nearly 2 million tons was reached in 1910. As coal-fired steam trains were being replaced by diesel power, the last mine in the area closed in 1963 as business became unprofitable.

As Roslyn was a "company town", life in the early years was centered around the production of coal. Most of the citizens of the town worked either for the Northern Pacific Coal Company or in one of the smaller businesses monopolized by the company, or were family members of someone who did. A hub of life in the town was the Northwestern Improvement Company Store, now listed on the National Register of Historic Places; it still stands at the corner of First Street and Pennsylvania Avenue.

Most of the town's 500 homes were built in the 1920s on land owned by the railroad. The 1920s-era commercial district consisted of four square blocks, of which about one dozen buildings remain as representatives of western frontier commercial architecture. Roslyn has many examples of Victorian elegance in its surviving buildings, as well as simple miner's shacks. The town of Roslyn was listed on the National Register of Historic Places in 1978.

=== Knights of Labor Strike of 1888 and African American migration ===
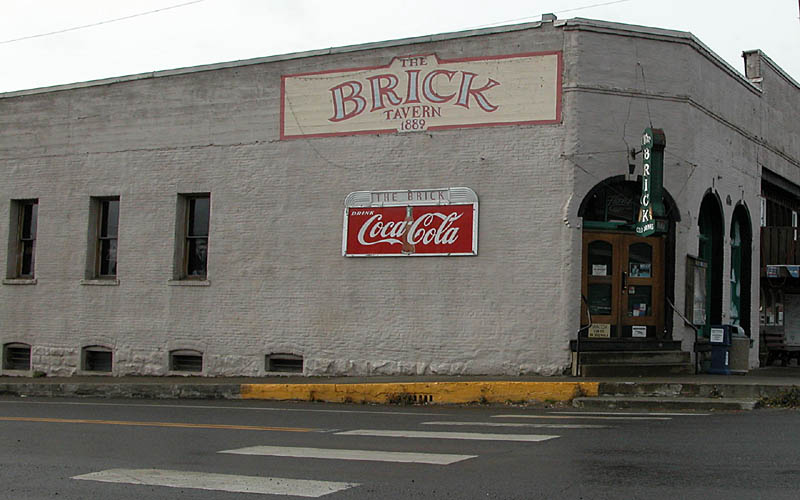
The Brick Tavern is the oldest continuously operating tavern in the state, and was featured prominently in Northern Exposure (1990 to 1995). Roslyn was used as the site for filming the fictitious town of Cicely, Alaska, in the hit CBS television series.

Tensions between management and labor in the Roslyn mines began spilling over in the summer of 1888, when management laid off a number of union workers who were petitioning for eight-hour work days and higher wages. These layoffs led to a strike by the Knights of Labor, which shut down the mines. The Northwest Coal Company, which operated Mine No. 3, located a few miles away in nearby Ronald, responded by recruiting strikebreakers. This included 50 black laborers from the East and Midwest who were transported by train with almost 40 private armed guards. The recruitment of these armed forces raised the interest of Territorial Governor Eugene Semple when he heard that they harassed area residents calling themselves U.S. Marshals. This was considered a paramilitary challenge to Washington Territory authority and Semple ordered the local sheriff to disperse the unit.

Semple visited Roslyn to investigate Northwest Coal Company's practices and condemned the company for hiring a private militia on suppositions that the white strikers would attack black laborers and overpower police forces. Semple's report describes the residents as "intelligent" and "law-abiding," and the company's suppositions as erroneous. He did not intervene in the labor disputes, and strikers continued to lose ground in negotiations.

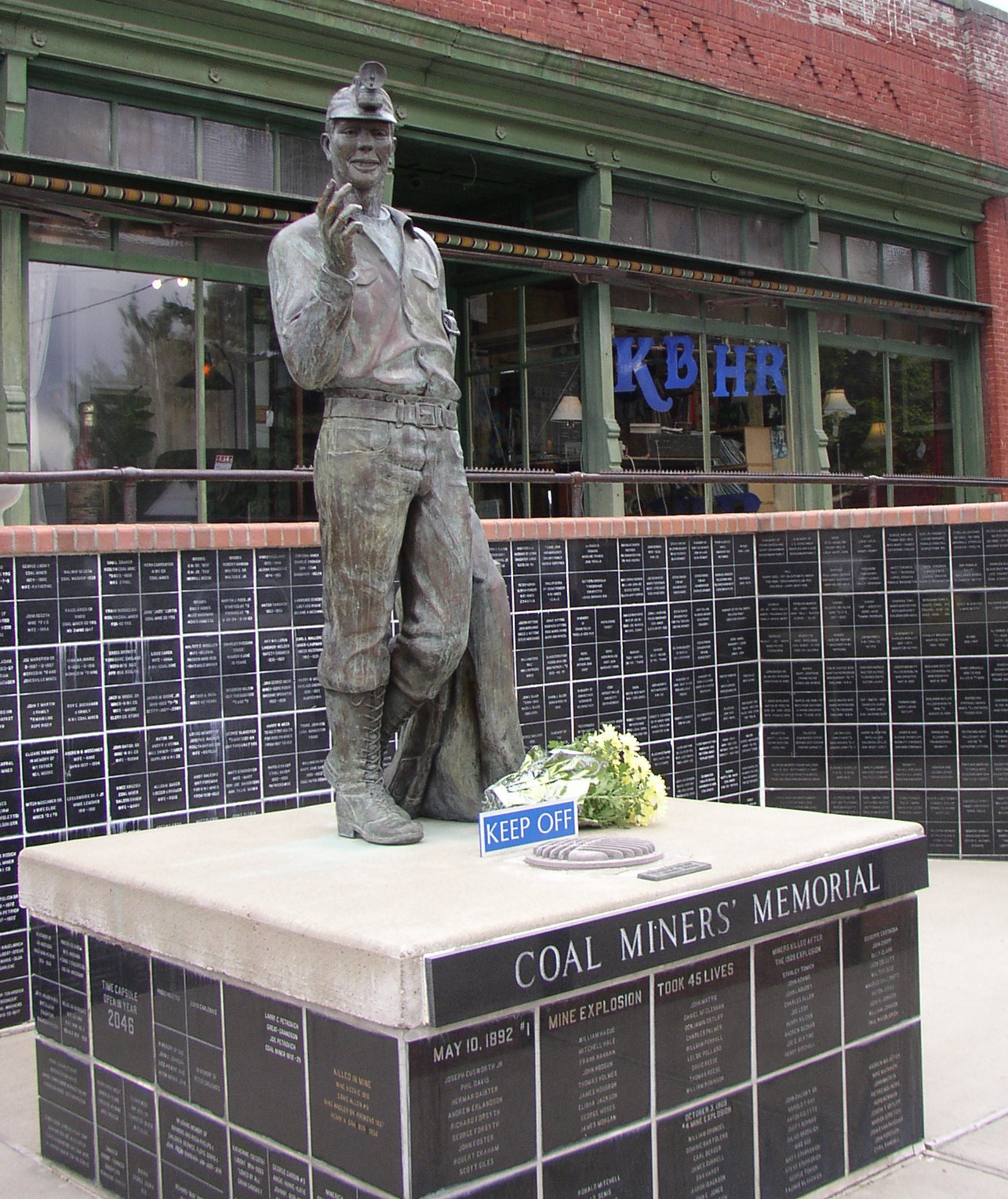
The Coal Miners' Memorial in Roslyn. The radio station film set from the Northern Exposure television series is in the background.

In a span of two years, the company recruited more than 300 black laborers from Virginia, North Carolina, and Kentucky. Many relocated with families, and this migration was the largest increase in the African-American population of Washington Territory up until that time. Sheriff Packwood of Kittitas County reported to Semple that relations between out-of-work white workers and the black population were strained with potential to turn violent. After the strike tensions subsided, whites reconciled themselves to working along black miners. As the regional coal industry boomed, competition for employment reduced, and eventually workers organized as equals with United Mine Workers.

=== African American population ===
In 1890, Roslyn's African American population was 22%, one of the highest in the state. Black fraternal organization lodges and civic institutions were established, including Prince Hall Masons, Knights of Pythias of North America, South America, Europe, Asia, Africa and Australia, Prince Hall Order of the Eastern Star, Daughters of Tabernacle, and African Methodist Episcopal Church. The Black population began to decline after the mines closed in 1963, and by the early 1970s only the Craven family remained. William Craven was elected mayor of Roslyn in 1976, and was the first African American mayor in the state of Washington.

The Roslyn Black Pioneers was established by Ethel Florence Craven to preserve and promote black history in Washington. The organization received a grant from Humanities Washington to build educational floats for Washington parades. In 2021, Governor Jay Inslee declared February 20 to be "William Craven Day."

=== Roslyn's ethnic cemeteries ===
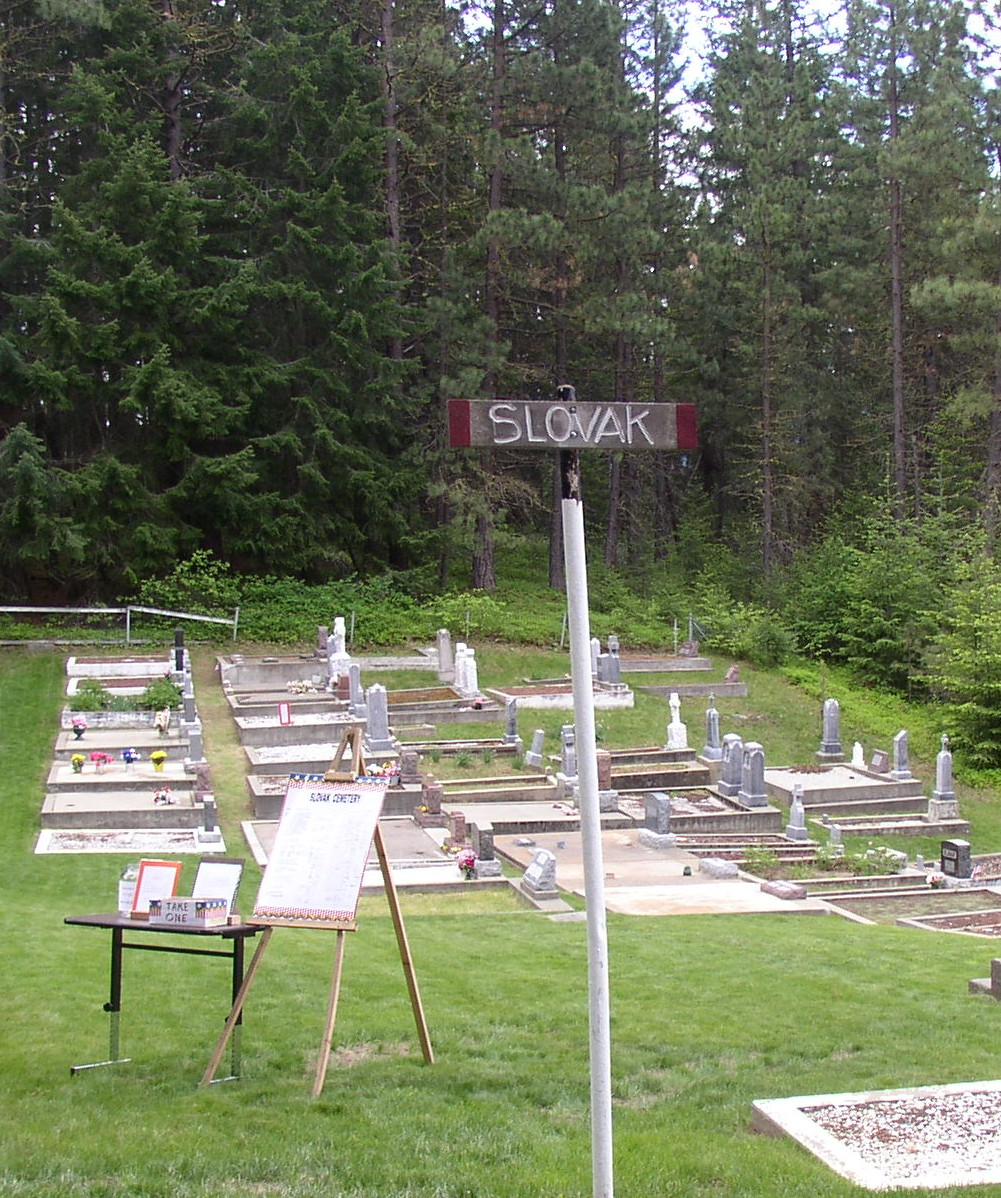
Roslyn's historic cemetery is divided into 26 ethnic plots like the one depicted here.

The Roslyn Cemetery is composed of 26 separate but adjacent cemetery plots, reflecting the diversity of early immigrant society. It was placed on the National Register of Historic Places in 1978.

=== Post mining era ===
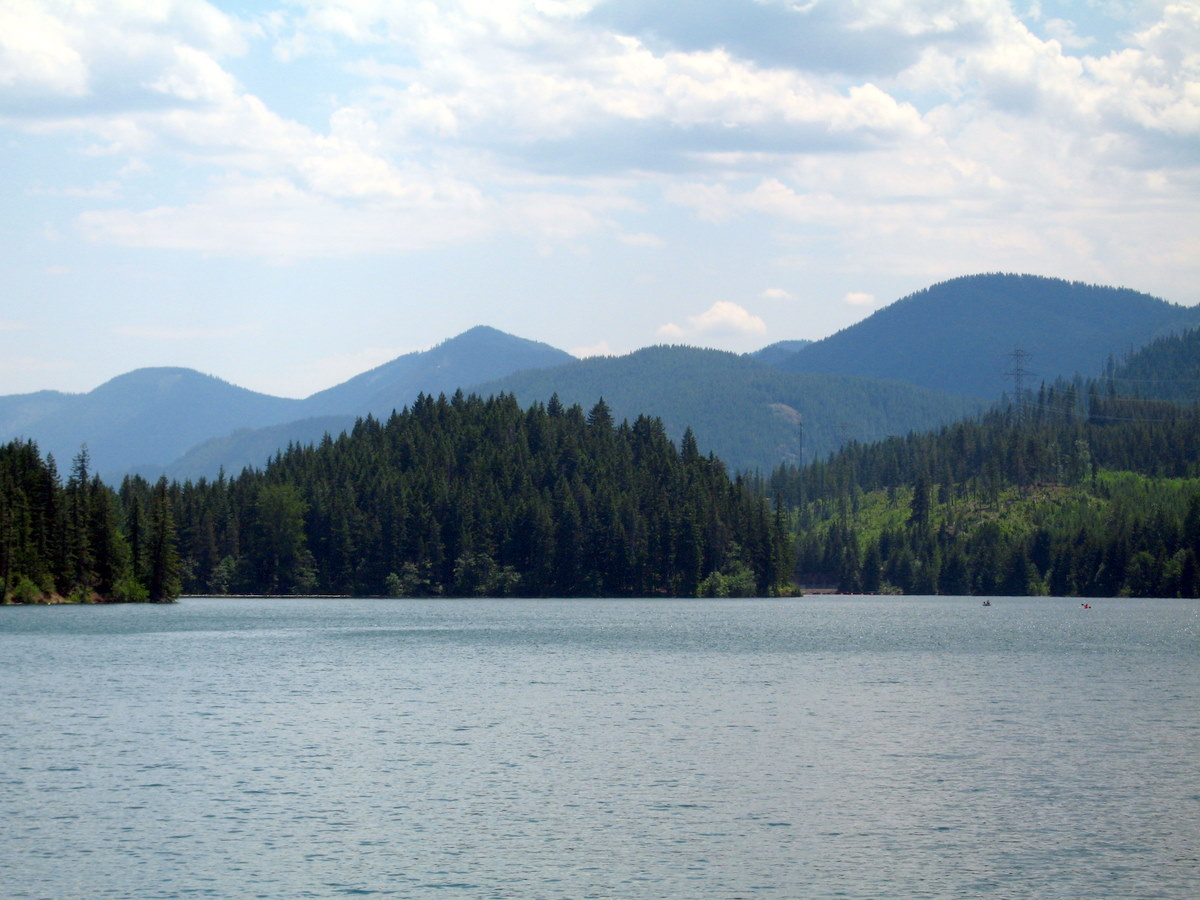
Lake Cle Elum near Roslyn is a year-round recreational destination.

Although Roslyn clings to its coal mining and timber harvesting past, it has become a tourist and recreation destination. Tourism to the town received a boost when it was featured as the filming location for The Runner Stumbles and Northern Exposure.

Development companies, including Suncadia, purchased forests once owned and managed by Plum Creek Timber Company for an extensive golf course community with houses and condominiums on the boundary of Roslyn.

However, some community members in Roslyn were concerned about the impacts of a Master Planned Resort on the community's economy and ecology. A Roslyn-based citizen group called RIDGE engaged Suncadia's owners in litigation to mitigate the effects of the resort. RIDGE and MountainStar Resort Development—who owned the land at the time—negotiated and signed the RIDGE Settlement Agreement in 2001. Though Kittitas County Judge Scott R. Sparks terminated the Agreement and all remaining claims in 2013, the Settlement Agreement was successful in some mitigations, such as Suncadia's donation of the Roslyn Urban Forest to the city of Roslyn and the Suncadia Resort development's adherence to Washington state's prevailing wage.

== Geography ==
Roslyn is located about 1 hour 25 mins – east-south-east from Seattle, Washington.

According to the United States Census Bureau, the city has a total area of 4.37 square miles (11.32 km^{2}), all of it land.

== Demographics ==
Historical population
Census	Pop.	Note	%±
1890	1,484		—
1900	2,786		87.7%
1910	3,126		12.2%
1920	2,673		−14.5%
1930	2,063		−22.8%
1940	1,743		−15.5%
1950	1,537		−11.8%
1960	1,283		−16.5%
1970	1,031		−19.6%
1980	938		−9.0%
1990	869		−7.4%
2000	1,017		17.0%
2010	893		−12.2%
2020	950		6.4%
U.S. Decennial Census

=== 2020 census ===
As of the 2020 census, Roslyn had a population of 950 and a median age of 46.5 years.

18.7% of residents were under the age of 18 and 23.3% of residents were 65 years of age or older.

For every 100 females there were 105.2 males, and for every 100 females age 18 and over there were 97.9 males age 18 and over.

97.6% of residents lived in urban areas, while 2.4% lived in rural areas.

There were 457 households in Roslyn, of which 24.3% had children under the age of 18 living in them. Of all households, 42.0% were married-couple households, 22.1% were households with a male householder and no spouse or partner present, and 26.0% were households with a female householder and no spouse or partner present. About 33.9% of all households were made up of individuals and 16.8% had someone living alone who was 65 years of age or older.

There were 611 housing units, of which 25.2% were vacant. The homeowner vacancy rate was 0.0% and the rental vacancy rate was 0.7%.

Racial composition as of the 2020 census
Race	Number	Percent
White	856	90.1%
Black or African American	5	0.5%
American Indian and Alaska Native	3	0.3%
Asian	11	1.2%
Native Hawaiian and Other Pacific Islander	0	0.0%
Some other race	12	1.3%
Two or more races	63	6.6%
Hispanic or Latino (of any race)	47	4.9%

=== 2010 census ===
As of the 2010 census, there were 893 people, 437 households, and 224 families residing in the city. The population density was 204.3 inhabitants per square mile (78.9/km^{2}). There were 648 housing units at an average density of 148.3 per square mile (57.3/km^{2}). The racial makeup of the city was 95.1% White, 0.4% African American, 1.1% Native American, 0.6% Asian, 0.1% from other races, and 2.7% from two or more races. Hispanic or Latino of any race were 2.7% of the population.

There were 437 households, of which 22.2% had children under the age of 18 living with them, 39.8% were married couples living together, 8.5% had a female householder with no husband present, 3.0% had a male householder with no wife present, and 48.7% were non-families. 39.6% of all households were made up of individuals, and 13.1% had someone living alone who was 65 years of age or older. The average household size was 2.04 and the average family size was 2.73.

The median age in the city was 43.2 years. 18.4% of residents were under the age of 18; 5.2% were between the ages of 18 and 24; 29.1% were from 25 to 44; 32.2% were from 45 to 64; and 15.1% were 65 years of age or older. The gender makeup of the city was 52.6% male and 47.4% female.

=== 2000 census ===
As of the 2000 census, there were 1,017 people, 467 households, and 249 families residing in the city. The population density was 82.3/km^{2} (213.0/sq mi).

There were 623 housing units at an average density of 130.5 per square mile (50.4/km^{2}). The racial makeup of the city was 95.87% White, 0.79% African American, 1.38% Native American, 0.39% Pacific Islander, and 1.57% from two or more races. Hispanic or Latino of any race were 1.38% of the population. Identification as to ethnicity in 2000 was as follows: 17.9% were of German ancestry, 15.9% English, 10.3% Irish, 7.1% Norwegian, 6.6% American, 5.7% Croatian, 5.7% Scotch-Irish, and 5.1% Italian.

There were 467 households, out of which 25.7% had children under the age of 18 living with them, 43.9% were married couples living together, 6.2% had a female householder with no husband present, and 46.5% were non-families. 37.9% of all households were made up of individuals, and 18.2% had someone living alone who was 65 years of age or older. The average household size was 2.18 and the average family size was 2.89.

In the city, the population was spread out, with 21.9% under the age of 18, 6.5% from 18 to 24, 26.9% from 25 to 44, 26.6% from 45 to 64, and 18.0% who were 65 years of age or older. The median age was 42 years. For every 100 females, there were 96.0 males. For every 100 females age 18 and over, there were 90.9 males.

The median income for a household in the city was $35,313, and the median income for a family was $45,179. Males had a median income of $32,379 versus $25,625 for females. The per capita income for the city was $18,412. About 8.2% of families and 12.6% of the population were below the poverty line, including 9.1% of those under age 18 and 15.5% of those age 65 or over.

== Roslyn Historic District ==
- Roslyn Historic District
- U.S. National Register of Historic Places
- U.S. Historic district
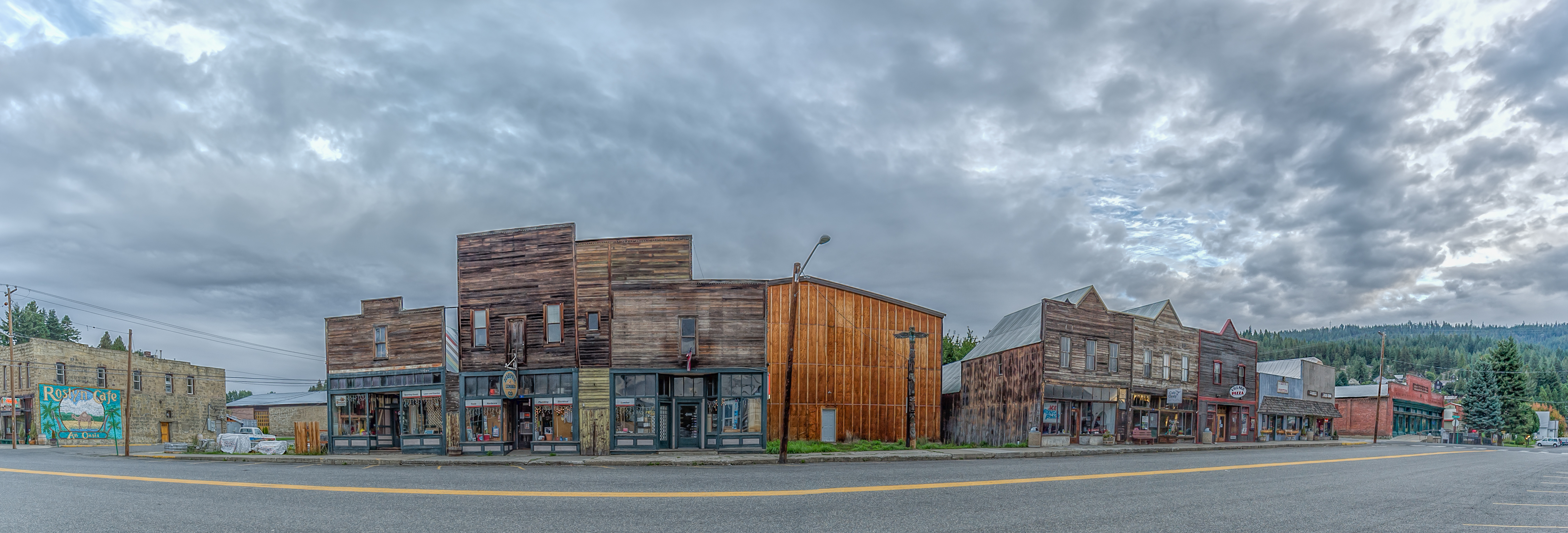
- Old storefronts in historic district
- Location: WA 2E, Roslyn, Washington
- Area: 340 acres (140 ha)
- Built: 1890
- NRHP reference No.: 78002760
- Added to NRHP: February 14, 1978

The Roslyn Historic District consists of the town of Roslyn as of 1977 which corresponds to the 1914 plat map, as well as the cluster of 26 cemeteries southwest of the town and a 58 acres (23 ha) open space, bisected by the tracks of the Roslyn Branch of the Northern Pacific Railroad, east of the town.

Commercial buildings contributing to the historical designation include:

- Roslyn City Hall and Library
- Immaculate Conception Catholic Church and Rectory
- Northwestern Improvement Company Store
- The Brick Tavern
- Cle Elum State Bank
- Mary's Freezer Shop

== Featured in media ==
- The Runner Stumbles, a 1979 film starring Dick Van Dyke and Kathleen Quinlan, was filmed in Roslyn.
- In 1990–95, Northern Exposure, a hit CBS television series, filmed its exterior scenes for the fictional town of Cicely, Alaska, in Roslyn and the surrounding area.
- In 2014, the Amazon Studios's TV adaptation of Philip K. Dick's novel The Man in the High Castle was filmed in Roslyn, which was represented as Cañon City, Colorado in the series.
