= Teanaway River =

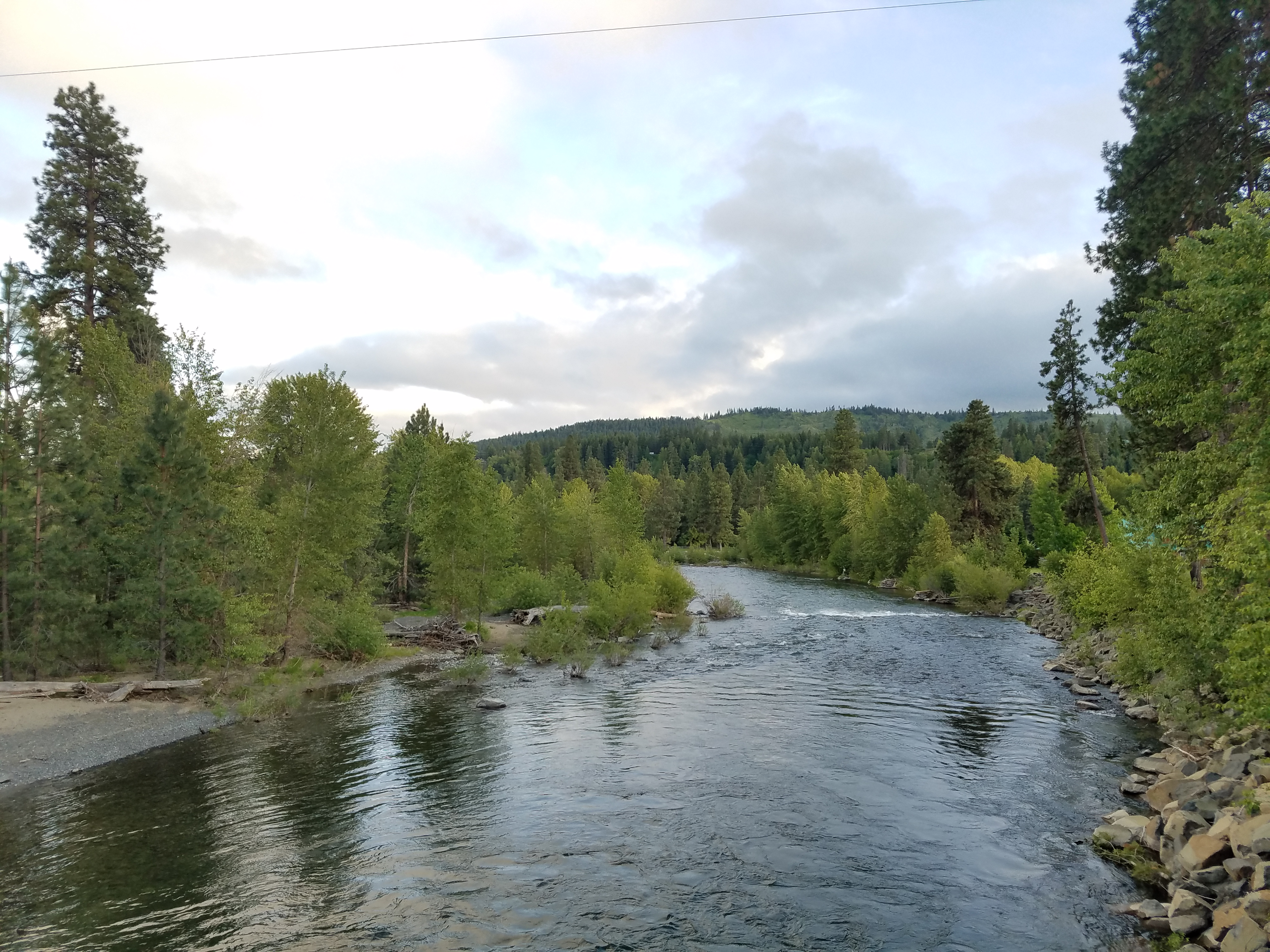

Location
- Country: United States
- State: Washington
- County: Kittitas

Physical characteristics
- Source: Cascade Range
  - coordinates: 47°15′24″N 120°53′54″W
  - elevation: 2,280 ft (690 m)
- Mouth: Yakima River
  - coordinates: 47°10′1″N 120°50′9″W
  - elevation: 1,820 ft (550 m)

The Teanaway River is a tributary of the Yakima River, in the U.S. state of Washington. It flows into the Yakima River near Cle Elum. The Teanaway River is part of the Columbia River basin, being a tributary of the Yakima River, which is a tributary to the Columbia River. The river's name comes from Sahaptin, possibly /tyawnawí-ins/, "drying place".

== Course ==
The Teanaway River begins near the confluence of its three forks, the North Fork, Middle Fork, and West Fork Teanaway. These forks all begins at elevations above 5,000 feet (1,500 m) in the Cascade Range northeast of Cle Elum Lake. The confluence is located in the vicinity of the Teanaway Community Forest.

After its forks joins, the Teanaway River curves through the Teanaway River Valley, flowing east, then west, then south to join the Yakima River near Teanaway.

== See also ==
- Teanaway, Washington
- List of rivers in Washington
- Tributaries of the Columbia River
