= Plum Creek Timber =

American lumber company

Plum Creek Timber Co.
- Company type: Public
- Traded as: NYSE: PCL
- Industry: Real estate investment trust
- Founded: 1989
- Defunct: 2016
- Fate: Merger with Weyerhaeuser
- Headquarters: Seattle, Washington, United States
- Key people: Rick R. Holley (CEO)
- Revenue: ▲$1.48 billion USD (FY 2014)
- Operating income: ▲$322 million USD (FY 2014)
- Net income: $214 million USD (FY 2014)
- Number of employees: 1,300 (2014)
- Website: plumcreek.com

Plum Creek Timber Company, Inc. was a timberland owner and manager, as well as a forest products, mineral extraction, and property development company, until it merged with Weyerhaeuser Company. It was headquartered in Suite 3100 at 601 Union Street in Seattle.

Plum Creek was spun off from Burlington Resources as a master limited partnership (MLP) on June 8, 1989. Burlington Resources was created from the Burlington Northern railroad's natural resources holdings in 1988. Plum Creek Timber is heir to some of the 47 million acres (19,000,000 ha) of timberland originally granted by the federal government to the Northern Pacific Railway in the 1860s, and most of Burlington's lands were originally purchased, or otherwise acquired as timberland. The MLP converted to a real estate investment trust on July 1, 1999, in order to obtain tax and accounting advantages available to real estate developers. In 2000, Plum Creek Timber acquired the timberland division of Georgia-Pacific.

Plum Creek Timber produces a line of softwood lumber products, including common and select boards, studs, edge-glued boards, and finger-jointed studs. These products are targeted to domestic lumber retailers, such as retail home centers, for use in repair and remodeling projects. These products are also sold to stocking distributors for use in home construction. The company also does mineral extraction, natural gas production, and deals with communication and transportation rights of way. As of December 31, 2014, the company owned and managed approximately 6.58 million acres (2,660,000 ha) of timber lands in 19 states, as well as owned and operated five wood product conversion facilities in the northwest U.S.

On November 8, 2015, it was announced that Plum Creek would be bought by Seattle-based Weyerhaeuser for $8.4 billion, forming the largest private owner of timberland in the United States. The transaction closed on February 19, 2016.

== Transactions with the U.S. federal government ==
In late 1999, Congress approved a land swap involving more than 42,000 acres (17,000 ha) of forest land in the Cascade Mountains. In the deal, Plum Creek gave up 31,000 acres (13,000 ha) of land, much of it along Interstate 90 east of Seattle, in exchange for 11,500 acres (4,700 ha) in federal lands. Plum Creek had warned the U.S. government that it would log the land should the deal not go through. The federal government also had to pay $4.3 million as part of the deal.

In 2008, Senator Max Baucus arranged for appropriations in the 2008 Farm Bill to be used to purchase 310,000 acres (130,000 ha) of Plum Creek land in Montana. This project became known as the Montana Legacy Project.

== Environmental record ==
There is some controversy over the management of Plum Creek's timberland, mostly from environmental groups who decry the recent move from Plum Creek as a timber management company into a developer of its land, taking advantage of the much more profitable land values that have occurred for undeveloped land in the late 1990s until the crash in real estate prices. Plum Creek is engaged in a proposal for a large resort and development tract in the Northern Maine Woods, on Moosehead Lake by Greenville, Maine, one of the largest undeveloped forests east of the Mississippi River.

This follows on the heels of their development of managed land in Washington state (Suncadia) and Montana (Moonlight Basin, Yellowstone Club) into costly resorts, bringing golf courses and luxury housing into the deep forests. The debate pits conservation groups trying to balance recreation and protection, and the effects of sprawl and overdevelopment upon wildlife, quality of life, and the employment of local populations who depend in part on the hunting, fishing and tourist trades which may be damaged by the overdevelopment of the area.

Plum Creek stated that they follow three principles, Replanting, Protecting Water Quality, and Managing Wildlife Habitat. Every year, Plum Creek replanted approximately 85 million seedlings and plans for the natural regeneration of millions of trees. Close to 2,000,000 acres (810,000 ha) of land owned by Plum Creek are a part of four habitat conservation plans across the country and in Montana are involved in a conservation agreement for the grizzly bear.

In 2001, Plum Creek at their Medium Density Fiberboard facility completed the installation of a biofilter, a new air emission treatment technology. This technology uses naturally occurring bacteria to destroy air pollutants that are generated in the wood fiber drying and pressing processes. The technology does not burn natural gas like most treatment systems do to destroy pollutants.

They are also currently working on a Plum Creek Moosehead development. According to an environmental group, the Native Forest Network (NFN), if approved by the Land Use Regulation Commission, Plum Creek's plan would increase Maine's total carbon emissions by nearly 8%.
