= Ronald, Washington =

- Census-designated place
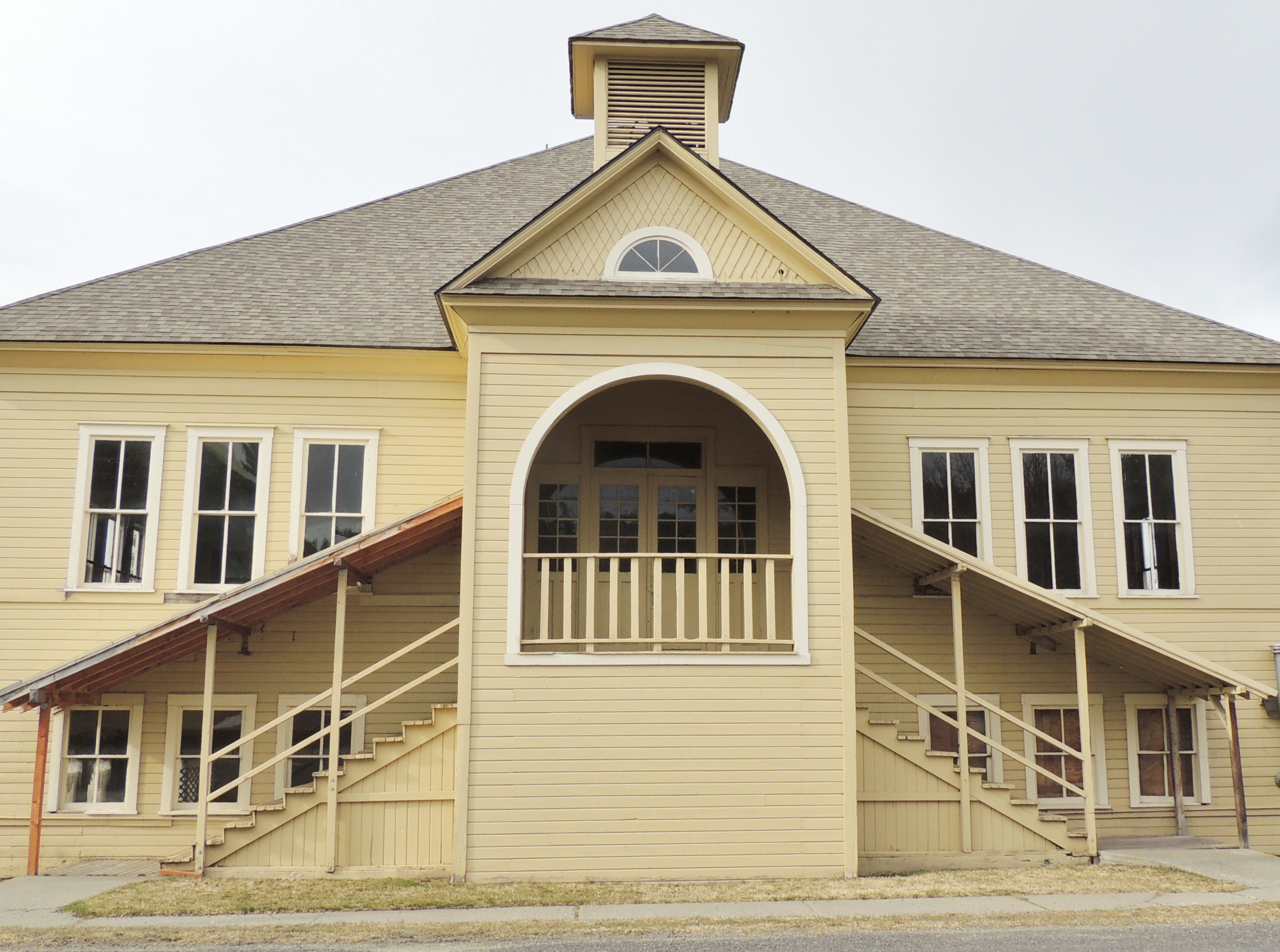
- Former school in Ronald

- Location of Ronald, Washington
- Coordinates: 47°14′02″N 121°02′01″W
- Country: United States
- State: Washington
- County: Kittitas

Area
  - Total: 0.93 sq mi (2.40 km^{2})
  - Land: 0.93 sq mi (2.40 km^{2})
  - Water: 0 sq mi (0.0 km^{2})
- Elevation: 2,372 ft (723 m)

Population (2020)
  - Total: 439
  - Density: 474/sq mi (183/km^{2})
- Time zone: UTC-8 (Pacific (PST))
  - Summer (DST): UTC-7 (PDT)
- ZIP code: 98940
- Area code: 509
- FIPS code: 53-59635
- GNIS feature ID: 2409206

Ronald is an unincorporated community and census-designated place (CDP) in Kittitas County, Washington, United States. As of the 2020 census, Ronald had a population of 439.

Ronald was named for Alexander Ronald, a former coal mine superintendent in the area.

== Geography ==
Ronald is located in western Kittitas County on the north side of the valley of the Cle Elum River. Washington State Route 903 passes through the community, leading southeast 5 miles (8 km) to Cle Elum and northwest 3 miles (5 km) to its end at Cle Elum Lake.

According to the United States Census Bureau, the Ronald CDP has a total area of 0.93 square miles (2.4 km^{2}), all of it land.

=== Climate ===
This region experiences warm (but not hot) and dry summers, with no average monthly temperatures above 71.6 °F. According to the Köppen Climate Classification system, Ronald has a warm-summer Mediterranean climate, abbreviated "Csb" on climate maps.

== Demographics ==
Historical population
Census	Pop.	Note	%±
2000	265		—
2010	308		16.2%
2020	439		42.5%
U.S. Decennial Census; 1990 2000 2010

Ronald first appeared as a census designated place in the 2000 U.S. census.

=== Racial and ethnic composition ===
Ronald CDP, Washington – Racial and ethnic composition Note: the US Census treats Hispanic/Latino as an ethnic category. This table excludes Latinos from the racial categories and assigns them to a separate category. Hispanics/Latinos may be of any race.
Race / Ethnicity (NH = Non-Hispanic)	Pop 2000	Pop 2010	Pop 2020	% 2000	% 2010	% 2020
White alone (NH)	249	282	386	93.96%	91.56%	87.93%
Black or African American alone (NH)	3	0	0	1.13%	0.00%	0.00%
Native American or Alaska Native alone (NH)	4	5	6	1.51%	1.62%	1.37%
Asian alone (NH)	1	2	4	0.38%	0.65%	0.91%
Native Hawaiian or Pacific Islander alone (NH)	0	0	0	0.00%	0.00%	0.00%
Other race alone (NH)	0	0	1	0.00%	0.00%	0.23%
Mixed race or Multiracial (NH)	1	8	21	0.38%	2.60%	4.78%
Hispanic or Latino (any race)	7	11	21	2.64%	3.57%	4.78%
Total	265	308	439	100.00%	100.00%	100.00%

=== 2000 census ===
As of the census of 2000, there were 265 people, 103 households, and 66 families residing in the CDP. The population density was 332.2 people per square mile (127.9/km^{2}). There were 186 housing units at an average density of 233.2/sq mi (89.8/km^{2}). The racial makeup of the CDP was 96.23% White, 1.13% African American, 1.51% Native American, 0.38% Asian, 0.38% from other races, and 0.38% from two or more races. Hispanic or Latino of any race were 2.64% of the population.

There were 103 households, out of which 32.0% had children under the age of 18 living with them, 46.6% were married couples living together, 13.6% had a female householder with no husband present, and 35.0% were non-families. 20.4% of all households were made up of individuals, and 13.6% had someone living alone who was 65 years of age or older. The average household size was 2.57 and the average family size was 3.01.

In the CDP, the population was spread out, with 26.0% under the age of 18, 4.9% from 18 to 24, 29.4% from 25 to 44, 22.6% from 45 to 64, and 17.0% who were 65 years of age or older. The median age was 40 years. For every 100 females, there were 96.3 males. For every 100 females age 18 and over, there were 92.2 males.

The median income for a household in the CDP was $39,063, and the median income for a family was $38,906. Males had a median income of $37,708 versus $20,500 for females. The per capita income for the CDP was $26,415. None of the families and 9.6% of the population were living below the poverty line.
