= Washington State Route 23 =

State highway in Washington, United States

State Route 23
- SR 23 highlighted in red

Route information
- Maintained by WSDOT
- Length: 66.00 mi (106.22 km)
- Existed: 1964–present

Major junctions
- South end: US 195 near Steptoe
- I-90 / US 395 in Sprague
- North end: SR 28 in Harrington

Location
- Country: United States
- State: Washington
- Counties: Whitman, Lincoln

Highway system
- State highways in Washington; Interstate; US; State; Scenic; Pre-1964; 1964 renumbering; Former
← SR 22	→ SR 24

State Route 23 (SR 23) is a state highway traversing Whitman and Lincoln counties in the U.S. state of Washington. The 66-mile (106.22 km) highway extends northwest from U.S. Route 195 (US 195) in Steptoe through Sprague to an intersection with SR 28 in Harrington. It serves as a route from Interstate 90 and US 395 in Sprague towards Pullman via US 195, and has a longer child route, SR 231 that travels north from SR 23 near Sprague to Reardan and Chewelah.

SR 23 was formally established in 1964 using roadways that have existed since 1937 as Secondary State Highway 11F (SSF 11C) from Sprague to Harrington and Secondary State Highway 11C (SSH 11C) from Steptoe to Sprague. SSH 11C was removed from Steptoe to Ewan in 1943 and became an extension of Primary State Highway 18 (PSH 18) and was completely designated as PSH 18 in 1953 and removed from the highway system in 1961. A second child route, SR 230, is proposed to be built from Ritzville to Ewan, but has not been built.

== Route description ==
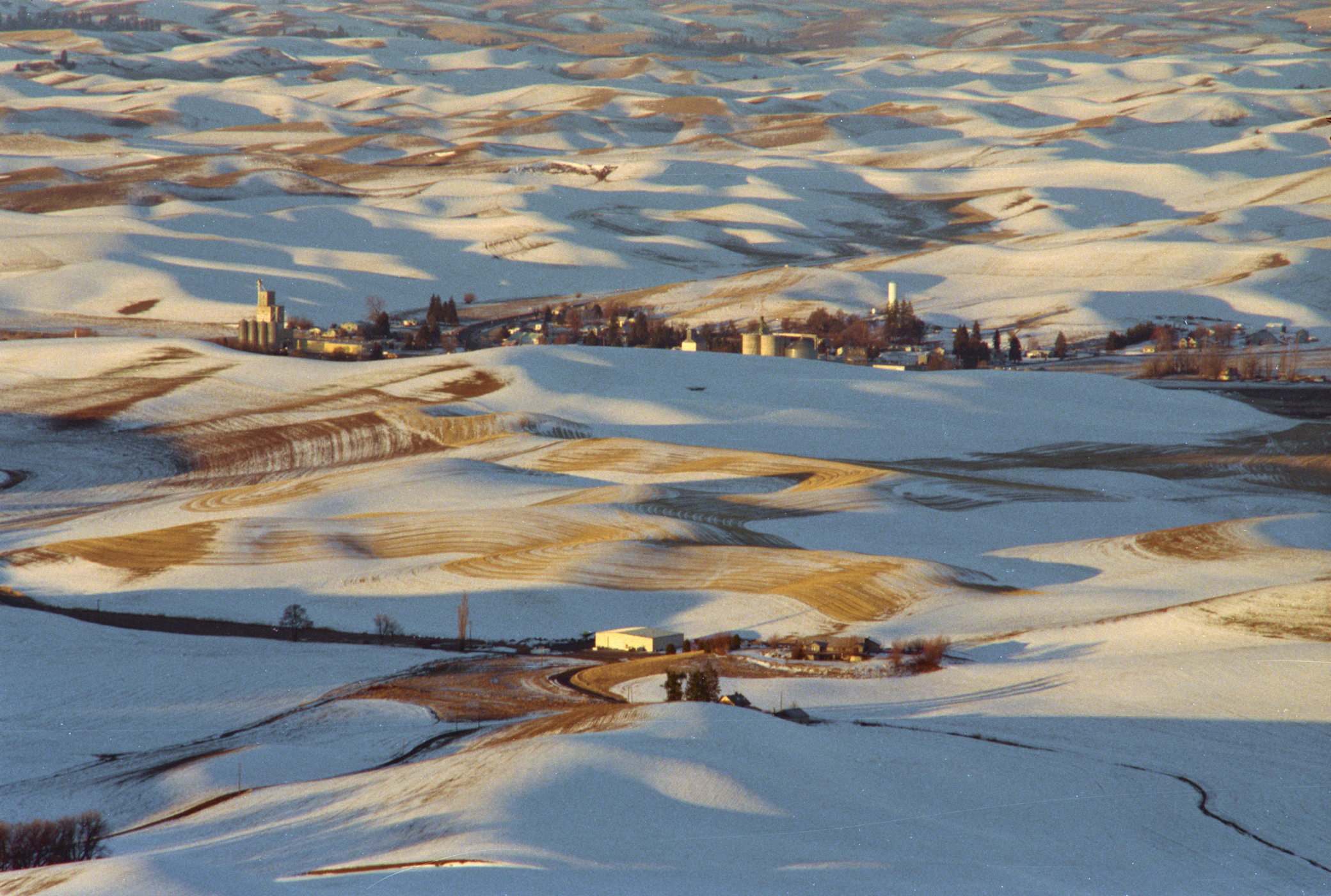
Steptoe, the southern terminus of SR 23

State Route 23 (SR 23) originates as Cashup Avenue at an intersection with U.S. Route 195 (US 195) in Steptoe, about 10 miles (16.1 km) north of Colfax. The road has 2 undivided lanes as it travels west through mostly rural areas and becomes Front Street in Saint John. Leaving the town, the highway turns northwest following Pleasant Valley Creek, intersecting the proposed terminus of SR 230 in Ewan and a road serving Lamont, passing several lakes, and leaving Whitman County. After entering Lincoln County, the highway crosses over Union Pacific and BNSF rail lines, then passes through Sprague. The highway serves as exit 245 on Interstate 90 (I-90) and US 395 in a diamond interchange, and is the busiest point on the route with an annual average daily traffic of 1,300 vehicles in 2011. North of the interchange, SR 231 splits off and travels north towards Reardan, being 8.97 miles (14.44 km) longer than SR 23. The highway continues northwest into Harrington, intersecting Coal Creek Road serving Harrington High School and becoming Sherlock Street. The road crosses a BNSF rail line and turns north, becoming 3rd Street until the route ends at SR 28.

== History ==
Shields of former SSH 11C and SSH 11F

SR–23 was formally established in 1964, but the roadway has existed as early as 1926. The road was officially added to the state highway system as two highways in 1937 as Secondary State Highway 11C (SSH 11C) from Steptoe to Sprague and Secondary State Highway 11F (SSF 11C) from Sprague to Harrington. SSH 11C was shortened in 1943 to a Ewan–Sprague route and the former section to Steptoe became part of an extension of Primary State Highway 18 (PSH 18). SSH 11C was completely removed from the system in 1951, and it took effect in 1961 as the number was reused elsewhere. SR 230 is proposed to connect SR 23 at Ewan to Interstate 90 (I-90) in Ritzville, but has not yet been built.

== Major intersections ==
County	Location	mi	km	Destinations	Notes
Whitman	Steptoe	0.00	0.00	US 195 – Colfax, Spokane	Southern terminus
Lincoln	Sprague	43.66– 43.81	70.26– 70.51	I-90 / US 395 – Seattle, Spokane	I-90 exit 245; interchange.
Lincoln		44.28	71.26	SR 231 north – Reardan	Southern terminus of SR 231
Lincoln	Harrington	66.00	106.22	SR 28 – Odessa, Davenport	Northern terminus
1.000 mi = 1.609 km; 1.000 km = 0.621 mi
