= Washington State Route 230 =

Never-built highway in Washington

State Route 230

Route information
- Auxiliary route of SR 23
- History: First proposed in 1943

Major junctions
- West end: I-90 / US 395 near Ritzville
- East end: SR 23 near Ewan

Location
- Country: United States
- State: Washington
- Counties: Adams, Whitman

Highway system
- State highways in Washington; Interstate; US; State; Scenic; Pre-1964; 1964 renumbering; Former
← SR 225	→ SR 231

State Route 230 (SR 230) is a legislated, but unconstructed, state highway to be located in Adams and Whitman counties in the U.S. state of Washington. The highway would begin at a junction with concurrent highways Interstate 90 (I-90) and U.S. Route 395 (US 395) near Ritzville and travel east to an intersection with SR 23 near Ewan.

Plans for the first highway first emerged in 1943 as an extension of Primary State Highway 18 (PSH 18) to be studied after the conclusion of World War II. It was renumbered to SR 230 in 1964, but no further action was taken on constructing the highway.

== Route description ==
The Revised Code of Washington describes SR 230 as an east–west route that begins at a junction with I-90 (concurrent with US 395) near Ritzville. The highway would travel east "by the most feasible route" to SR 23 near Ewan, a rural community in Whitman County. A 1956 map showed an alignment that passed Finnell and Crane lakes before dipping south and turning northeast. The Washington State Highway Commission estimated the total length of the corridor to be 27.82 miles (44.77 km) in a 1960 report.

The two areas are generally connected by local roads, including Urquhart and Harder roads in Adams County, but they are not rated for all-weather use. Ritzville and Ewan are connected by I-90 and SR 23, which intersect in Sprague.

== History ==
The Ritzville–Ewan highway was first proposed in a 1943 bill by state senator Elmer C. Huntley of St. John. It was designated as a branch of Primary State Highway 18 (PSH 18) between Ritzville and Steptoe, connecting US 395 to US 195. The highway would use several existing county roads from Ewan to Steptoe that ranged from oiled to graded gravel. In 1945, Huntley lobbied for an earmark of over $1.5 million (equivalent to $20.7 million in 2024) to be set aside for the project to be used after World War II. The new section would cut the driving distance from Ritzville to Colfax by 20 miles (32 km) and was anticipated to become "one of the principal, if not the principal" east–west highways in the region.

A 1960 report from the Washington State Highway Commission estimated that it would cost $3.26 million (equivalent to $26.4 million in 2024) to construct the highway within a 15-year timeframe. During the 1964 state highway renumbering, the PSH 18 branch was replaced by two new state routes: SR 23 between Steptoe and Ewan, which continued north on Secondary State Highway 11C (SSH 11C) through Sprague; and SR 230 for the unbuilt section between Ritzville and Ewan. An evaluation of unbuilt highway projects by the state government published in 1972 determined that constructing SR 230 would have a low cost–benefit ratio and serve little traffic. The legal definition of SR 23, the highway's proposed eastern terminus, was amended during the 1987 legislative session to remove a reference to a junction with SR 230.

== Major intersections ==
County	Location	mi	km	Destinations	Notes
Adams	Ritzville			I-90 / US 395 – Seattle, Spokane	Western terminus
Whitman	Ewan			SR 23 – Colfax, Sprague	Eastern terminus
1.000 mi = 1.609 km; 1.000 km = 0.621 mi: Unopened

== See also ==
- Washington State Route 168 - another legislated but unconstructed state highway
