= Davenport Municipal Airport =

Davenport Municipal Airport may refer to:

- Davenport Municipal Airport (Iowa) in Davenport, Iowa, United States (FAA/IATA: DVN)
- Davenport Municipal Airport (Washington) in Davenport, Washington, United States (FAA: 68S)
