= Harker Canyon (Washington) =

Canyon in Washington state, U.S.

Coordinates: 47.7966°N 118.0761°W

Harker Canyon is formed by a tributary of the Spokane River, where it forms the Spokane Arm of Franklin D. Roosevelt Lake, in Lincoln County, Washington, United States. A small portion of the canyon where it empties into the Spokane River is part of the Lake Roosevelt National Recreation Area. The remainder of the canyon is private land.

== Geography ==
Harker Canyon is 5.6 mi (9.0 km) long. The canyon is oriented north-northeast by south-southwest. The canyon opens into the Spokane River at its northern end at 1,350 feet (410 m) elevation, and the top of the canyon at its southern end is at about 2,720 feet (830 m) elevation above sea level. The top of the canyon is less than 0.62 mi (1 km) from the point where State Route 25 crosses the top of Teel Hill. The northern half of the canyon is accessible by Harker Canyon Road, which intersects State Route 25 about 4.0 mi (6.5 km) north of the town of Davenport.

The canyon has been prone to wildfires in the latter half of the 20th century and early 21st century. A wildfire burned 1,570 acres (634 ha) in the canyon between August 10 and August 15, 2005. The estimated total cost for fighting the fire was 1.0 million USD.

== Population ==
Most of the homes built in Harker Canyon are cottages or vacation houses used for recreational purposes in the spring, summer, and fall. Some homes are occupied year-round, and real estate listings promote the canyon's proximity to the town of Davenport. Mailing addresses on Harker Canyon Road use the Davenport post office.
