= Lincoln, Washington =

Unincorporated community in Washington, United States

- Unincorporated community
- Location within Washington (state) Location within the United States
- Coordinates: 47°49′45″N 118°24′54″W
- Country: United States
- State: Washington
- County: Lincoln
- Elevation: 1,394 ft (425 m)
- Time zone: UTC-8 (Pacific (PST))
  - Summer (DST): UTC-7 (PDT)
- ZIP codes: 99147
- GNIS feature ID: 1506158

Lincoln (also Lincoln Mill) is an unincorporated community in Lincoln County, Washington, United States, in the eastern part of the state. Located on the shores of Franklin D. Roosevelt Lake, it lies 7 mi (11.3 km) northeast of Creston. Its elevation is 1,394 feet (425 m). It has a post office with the ZIP code 99147.
