= Wilson Hotel =

- U.S. National Register of Historic Places
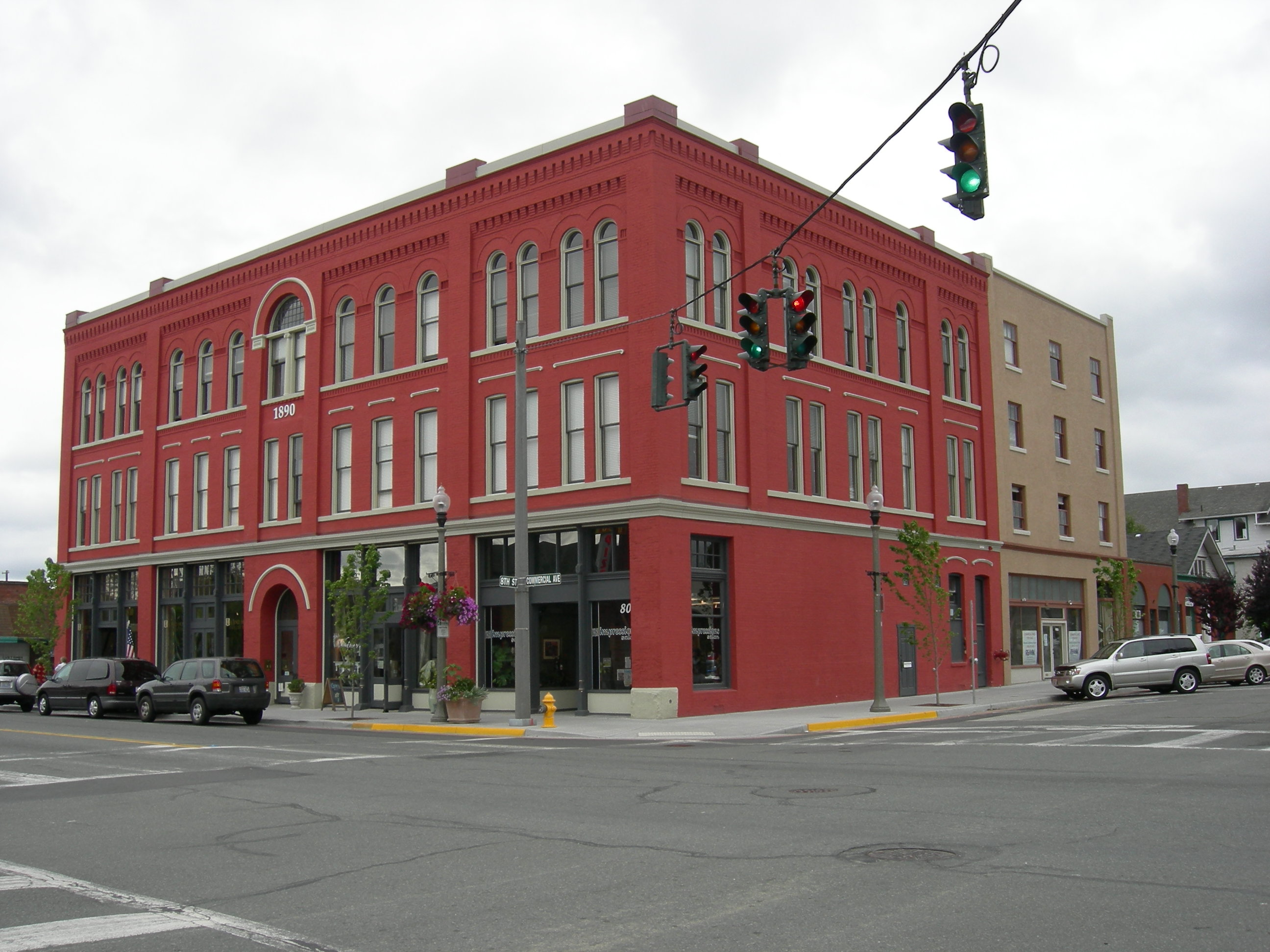

- Location within Washington (state)
- Location: Anacortes, Washington
- Coordinates: 48°31′3.48″N 122°36′46.57″W
- Built: 1890
- Architect: Pickles, James; Sutton, Albert
- Architectural style: Romanesque, Early Commercial
- NRHP reference No.: 04001369
- Added to NRHP: December 15, 2004

The Wilson Hotel (also known as the Wilson Block) is a historic building in downtown Anacortes, Washington, United States. It was built in 1890 during a speculative land boom when cites across northern Puget Sound were competing to become the western terminus of the Great Northern Railway's transcontinental route. It was designed by the firm of Pickles and Sutton and built by capitalist David Wilson, all of Tacoma, and was built of locally made brick. The building's design is Romanesque with masticated stone bases, rounded windows and roman arches. Rechristened the New Wilson Hotel after a remodeling in 1911, The hotel was expanded in 1926 with a 4-story addition that matched the height of the original 3-story building. It served as a hotel into the 1970s when it was converted to apartments. Recently, the Wilson underwent complete restoration and earthquake retrofitting. The work was completed in 2007. The Wilson currently features retail on the main floor and low income housing on the upper floors.

== History ==
The Wilson Hotel was the project of Tacoma resident David Wilson, a speculative investor who had followed the Northern Pacific Railway there in the early 1880s after it had chosen Tacoma as its terminus. Wilson had spearheaded investment projects in burgeoning railroad towns throughout Washington State in the 1880s including Yakima and Davenport where he financed the construction of several hotels and business blocks. In the late 1880s as the Great Northern Railway was looking to locate its own western terminus in the Puget Sound country, cities up and down the coast began booming in hopes of attracting the road. Wilson chose the nascent Anacortes for his investment and began buying property. In 1890 he commissioned Pickles & Sutton, one of Tacoma's leading architectural firms at the time, to design a large brick hotel and would eventually hire a Tacoman to run it. Yet another Tacoman, contractor and brick mason David See, was hired by Wilson to set up a brick yard specifically to supply him with the 1 million bricks that would be needed for the hotel and a bank building planned for Q Avenue that was never completed. Arriving in town in May, See's brick yard would be up and running within a month. Time would eventually prove the quality of See's brick to be very poor, and most buildings built of it, including the Wilson, would have to be stuccoed or veneered to protect them from the moist climate. Construction of Wilson's block began on June 4, 1890 at the corner of Avenue P (now Commercial Ave) and Eighth Streets. Local papers at the time considered it one of the largest and costliest buildings yet built in Anacortes, with an estimated price tag of $42,000 ($1.51 million in 2025 dollars). Despite several material shortages and additional brick having to be shipped in from Tacoma, construction was pushed through and the building was completed by December 1890. It wouldn't fully open to guests until February 1891.

The original hotel when completed contained 62 sleeping rooms on the upper floors including a large parlor on the second floor corner. The interiors were decorated in the Eastlake style, finished in local red cedar and red cherry woods. Four store rooms were located on the ground floor facing Commercial Avenue, with a dining room, hotel offices and a bar room occupying the southern two. The Romanesque facade was trimmed with stone and tin and originally featured a large central pediment bearing the building's name (long ago lost to deterioration). A 1-story brick wing containing a kitchen and wood shed was added behind the hotel in 1891 giving the building an L-shaped footprint. According to Sanborn insurance maps, several wooden outbuildings used for housekeeping and laundry filled the remainder of the property, now used as a garden.

Following its construction, the Wilson Hotel became an important landmark and a major scene of social life in Anacaortes, with numerous social and political functions being held in its parlor room. When the town installed its first telephone and electric services in 1890 and 1891, respectively, the Wilson was among the first buildings to receive them.

While the Great Northern would bypass Anacortes in favor of Everett and eventually Seattle, Anacortes became a more minor terminus when the Northern Pacific built a branch line from their main at Sedro-Woolley. Located within blocks of the railroad depot, The Wilson soon became the hotel of choice for visiting dignitaries and businessmen, outpacing the rival Hotel Anacortes, once an even grander structure that eventually fell into disrepair as the city's boom waned, leaving the large building stranded in an area that commercial development never reached. Despite its success as a gathering place, the hotel and its owner were not immune to the approaching hard times and were soon ruined by the Panic of 1893. By the end of that year, David Wilson was broke, and the hotel was closed to guests, later sold off at a sheriff's auction to pay off its accrued property taxes.

The building was purchased by Valentine Funk in 1901, whose grandson Wallie would run the hotel into the 1960s as well as being in charge of the local newspaper, the Anacortes American. In 1911, the hotel underwent an $18,000 renovation by proprietors Jack Whalen & Burnham Freeman from Everett. All rooms were refurnished with the total number of rooms reduced to 51 to provide 12 with private bathrooms. Reopened in October 1911 as the New Wilson Hotel, it was touted as the finest hotel not just in Anacortes but between Seattle and Bellingham, with electricity, steam heat, and both hot and cold running water listed among the features. In May 1926 the Funks undertook another major refurbishment and expansion of the hotel by replacing the 1891 kitchen annex with an unadorned 4-story reinforced concrete annex that, despite the extra floor, would match the old building in height; An elevator was installed in the annex that could stop at floors in either building. The interior of the old building was rearranged so that all rooms now had a private bathroom. The $50,000 remodeling was complete within a few months and the appearance of the New Wilson Hotel has remained largely the same since.

== See also ==
- List of Registered Historic Places in Washington
