= Sprague Lake (Washington) =

Lake in Washington state, United States

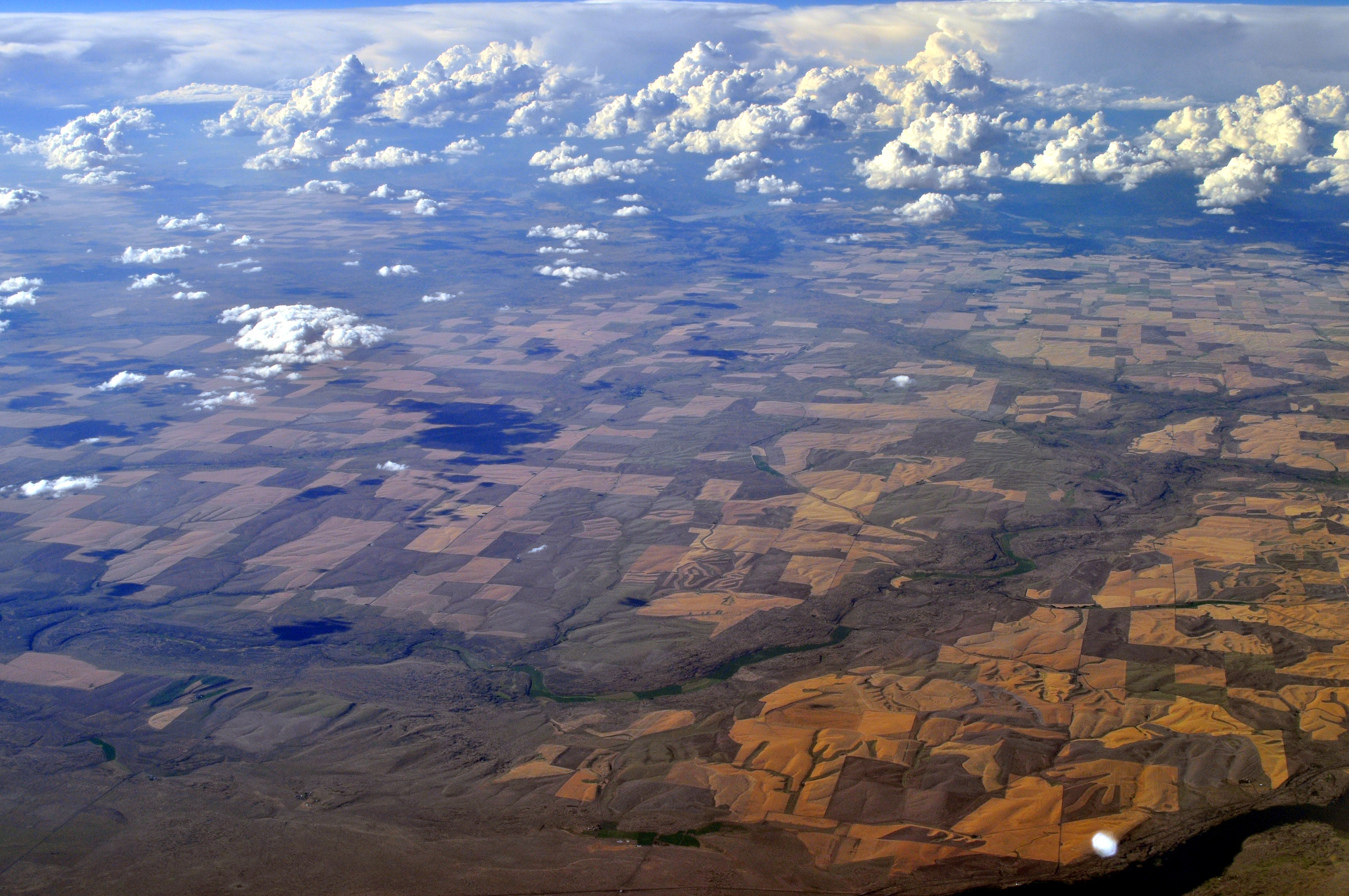
- Aerial view of Lincoln County, WA with Sprague Lake in the lower right corner.

- Location within Washington (state) Location within the United States
- Location: Washington
- Coordinates: 47°15′36″N 118°03′56″W
- Primary inflows: Ettienne Creek
- Primary outflows: Cow Creek
- Basin countries: United States
- Surface area: 1,760 acres (712 ha)
- Max. depth: 20 ft (6 m)
- Water volume: 19,000 acres (7,700 ha)
- Surface elevation: 1883 ft (574 m)
- Islands: Harper Island

Sprague Lake is a lake in Washington, straddling the border of Adams and Lincoln counties. It is two miles west of the town of Sprague. Sprague Lake is drained by Cow Creek, a tributary of the Palouse River. The lake was originally called Lake Colville.

Sprague Lake is used for sport fishing of rainbow and cutthroat trout, largemouth bass, bluegill, as well as brown bullhead, channel catfish, black crappie, and yellow perch.

== See also ==
- List of lakes in Washington
