= 63rd Ohio Infantry Regiment =

- Active: January 23, 1862 – July 8, 1865
- Country: United States
- Allegiance: Union
- Branch: Union Army
- Type: Infantry
- Size: ~1,000 soldiers at organization
- Part of: Army of the Mississippi Jan. - Nov. 1862; Army of the Tennessee Nov. 1862 - Jul. 1865
- Engagements: American Civil War; Battle of New Madrid; Battle of Island Number Ten; Siege of Corinth; Battle of Iuka; Atlanta campaign; Sherman's March to the Sea; Carolinas campaign

Commanders
- Notable commanders: John W. Sprague; Oscar L. Jackson

The 63rd Ohio Infantry Regiment was an infantry regiment which served in the Union Army during the American Civil War. It was a part of the Union forces in the Western Theater of operations.

== Organization ==
The original 63rd Ohio Infantry Regiment was organized on December 1, 1861, at Camp Worthington in Columbus and at Camp Marietta in Marietta, but only enough men were available to fill four companies. Hence, the 63rd was not officially designated as a regiment.

The 63rd Ohio Infantry was organized January 23, 1862, in Marietta, Ohio, by consolidation of a battalion of the 22nd Ohio Infantry Regiment and the four companies originally raised for the 63rd Ohio Infantry Regiment. Governor David Tod appointed John W. Sprague as the regiment's colonel. Its ten individual companies had been raised in southern Ohio.

== Service history ==
The regiment immediately took the field and joined Major General John Pope in Missouri. At New Madrid, the 63rd was brigaded with other Ohio regiments in what became known as the Ohio Brigade. It took part in all the operations resulting in the surrender of Island No. 10.

In April 1862, the 63rd Ohio Infantry joined Maj. Gen. Henry Halleck's forces near Corinth, Mississippi. After the evacuation, it operated in Northern Alabama, and participated in the battles of Iuka and Corinth in the army of William S. Rosecrans. Colonel Sprague was promoted to brigadier general, and Oscar L. Jackson assumed command of the regiment.

During 1863, the 63rd Ohio Infantry operated mostly in Northern Alabama and Tennessee. In January 1864, most of the men re-enlisted for three years, and the regiment went to Ohio on veteran furlough. In May it joined Sherman's Atlanta campaign and shared in all the battles to the end of the campaign. In the autumn, the 63rd Ohio Infantry took part in Sherman's March to the Sea.

In early 1865, the 63rd Ohio Infantry participated in the Carolinas campaign. It took part in the Grand Review of the Armies in Washington, D.C. in May and then went by train to Louisville, Kentucky, where the men mustered out on July 8, 1865.

The regiment lost during its term of service 2 officers and 91 enlisted men killed and mortally wounded; and 5 officers and 259 enlisted men by disease, for a total of 357 fatalities.

== See also ==
- Battle of Island Number Ten
- Siege of Corinth
- Atlanta campaign
- Sherman's March to the Sea
- Carolinas campaign
