= John W. Sprague =

American politician

John Wilson Sprague
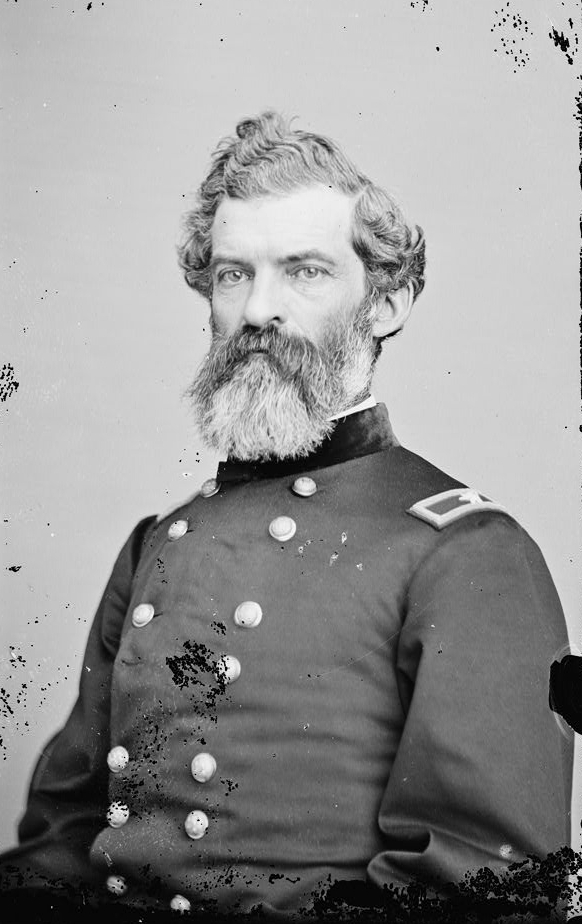
- Brig. Gen. John W. Sprague
- Born: April 4, 1817; White Creek, New York, US
- Died: December 27, 1893 (aged 76); Tacoma, Washington, US
- Burial place: Tacoma Cemetery, Tacoma, Washington
- Military career
- Allegiance: United States of America; Union
- Branch: United States Army; Union Army
- Service years: 1861–1866
- Rank: Brigadier General; Brevet Major General
- Unit: Army of the Tennessee
- Commands: 63rd Ohio Infantry; 2nd Brigade, 4th Division, XVI Corps
- Conflicts: American Civil War: Battle of New Madrid; Battle of Island Number Ten; Siege of Corinth; Battle of Iuka; Vicksburg Campaign; Atlanta campaign; Sherman's March to the Sea; Carolinas campaign
- Awards: Medal of Honor
- Other work: Businessman, county treasurer, railroad executive

John Wilson Sprague (April 4, 1817 – December 27, 1893) was an American soldier and railroad executive. He served as a general in the Union Army in the Western Theater of operations during the American Civil War. He received the Medal of Honor for gallantry at the Battle of Decatur during the Atlanta campaign. After the war, he was a railroad executive and later co-founded the city of Tacoma, Washington, serving as its first mayor.

== Early life and career ==
John W. Sprague was born in White Creek, New York, on April 4, 1817, the son of Otis and Polly (Peck) Sprague. He was educated in the district school of his neighborhood and at the age of thirteen entered the Rensselaer Polytechnic Institute at Troy, New York. He left school before graduation to engage in the grocery business, and in 1845 removed to Milan, Ohio, where he continued the business of a merchant in the shipping and commission sales businesses. He afterward settled in Sandusky and was for one term (1851–52) the treasurer of Erie County, Ohio.

He was married to Lucy Wright, daughter of a judge of Huron County, Ohio. However, she died in Troy, New York, in May 1844, not long after giving birth to a daughter. He was remarried to Julia Frances Choate of Milan; the couple had five children of their own.

In the late 1850s he organized and equipped a line of sailboats and steamers for traffic on Lake Erie and was engaged in that business when war erupted.

== Civil War service ==
With the outbreak of the Civil War and President Abraham Lincoln's call for 100,000 volunteers to put down the rebellion, Sprague raised a company of infantry and was sent to Camp Dennison near Cincinnati. Upon being mustered into Federal service, he became the captain of Company E of the 7th Ohio Infantry. While returning home on furlough in August 1861, he and a small party of fellow Buckeyes were captured in West Virginia and held as prisoners of war. Sprague was exchanged in January 1862 and returned to his regiment.

Later that month, Sprague was appointed as the colonel of the newly designated 63rd Ohio Infantry, The regiment was organized on January 23 by consolidating partially filled battalions from the 22nd Ohio Infantry and the 63rd Ohio regiments. After brief training and drilling, Sprague and his men took the field, traveled via train to the South, and joined Major General John Pope in Missouri. Sprague led the regiment at the Siege of Corinth, Mississippi, and then was in charge of the Ohio Brigade during the Battle of Iuka in 1862.

For the next several months, Sprague took part in the army's general operations in northern Alabama and Mississippi, extending sometimes into Tennessee. He participated in the Vicksburg Campaign in early and mid-1863. In the fall of 1863, as part of the forces under Maj. Gen. William T. Sherman, he moved with his regiment eastward toward Chattanooga, Tennessee. his regiment was part of the force under command of General Grenville M. Dodge that was detached to secure the railroad to Decatur, Alabama.

During the 1864 Atlanta Campaign, Sprague was in command of the 2nd Brigade, 4th Division of the Sixteenth Army Corps. During the Battle of Atlanta on July 22, 1864, at a subsidiary action near Decatur, Georgia, he masterfully conducted a delaying action under heavy enemy fire and received praise from his superiors. With only a small command, he defeated an overwhelming Confederate force and saved the entire ordnance and supply trains of the XV, XVI, XVII, and XX corps.

Sprague was promoted to the rank of brigadier general on July 30, 1864. He moved with Sherman on the March to the Sea and then northward during the Carolinas campaign. He commanded the brigade on its march from Raleigh, North Carolina, through Richmond to Washington, D.C., and participated in the Grand Review of the Armies in May. On April 3, 1866, President Andrew Johnson nominated Sprague for appointment to the grade of brevet major general, to rank from March 13, 1865, and the United States Senate confirmed the appointment on April 26, 1866.

From April 1865 until September 1866, Sprague was the assistant commissioner of the Freedmen's Bureau for the district of Arkansas, serving under Maj. Gen. Oliver O. Howard. He was in charge of operations in Missouri, Kansas, and subsequently the Indian Territory. In September 1865, he declined a lieutenant-colonelcy in the Regular Army and mustered out of the service. He was succeeded by Edward O. C. Ord.

== Postbellum career ==
He was appointed as the manager of the Winona & St. Paul Railway in Minnesota. In 1870 he became the general manager of the Western Division of the Northern Pacific Railway and co-established the city of Tacoma, Washington, on Puget Sound. He was instrumental in selecting the route for the railroad's Pacific Division, from what later became Kalama, Washington, to Tacoma. In 1883 he had the honor of driving the golden spike on the completion of his division. However, he suffered from poor health and was forced to resign a few months later.

He was active in building up the new city of Tacoma and was president of the board of trade and of various banks and corporations. He served as the town's first mayor, became prominent in its financial circles, and was president of the National Bank, Tacoma Chamber of Commerce, and the Tacoma Steam Navigation Company. His second wife Julia died in 1886. He later married Abigail Choate.

The town of Sprague, Washington, founded in 1880, was named for General Sprague. Lincoln County, Washington, was originally named for Sprague, until opposition from political enemy (and former Union colonel) Joseph H. Houghton, a Washington Territory legislator.

After suffering for several years from heart disease and chronic cystitis, Sprague died at his home in Tacoma on December 27, 1893, and was buried in the city's cemetery. In 1894 the United States Congress awarded the Medal of Honor to General John W. Sprague for distinguished gallantry during the Battle of Decatur. However, Sprague never saw his medal, having died several weeks before it arrived.

The John W. Sprague Camp of the Sons of Union Veterans of the Civil War was named in his honor.

== Medal of Honor citation ==

SPRAGUE, JOHN W.

Rank and Organization: Colonel, 63d Ohio Infantry. Place and Date: At Decatur, Ga., 22 July 1862. Entered Service At: Sandusky, Ohio Born: 4 April 1817, White Creek, N.Y. Date of Issue: 18 January 1894.

Citation:

With a small command defeated an overwhelming force of the enemy and saved the trains of the corps.

== See also ==
- List of American Civil War generals (Union)
- List of mayors of Tacoma, Washington
