= Mohler, Washington =

Unincorporated community in Washington, United States

- Unincorporated community
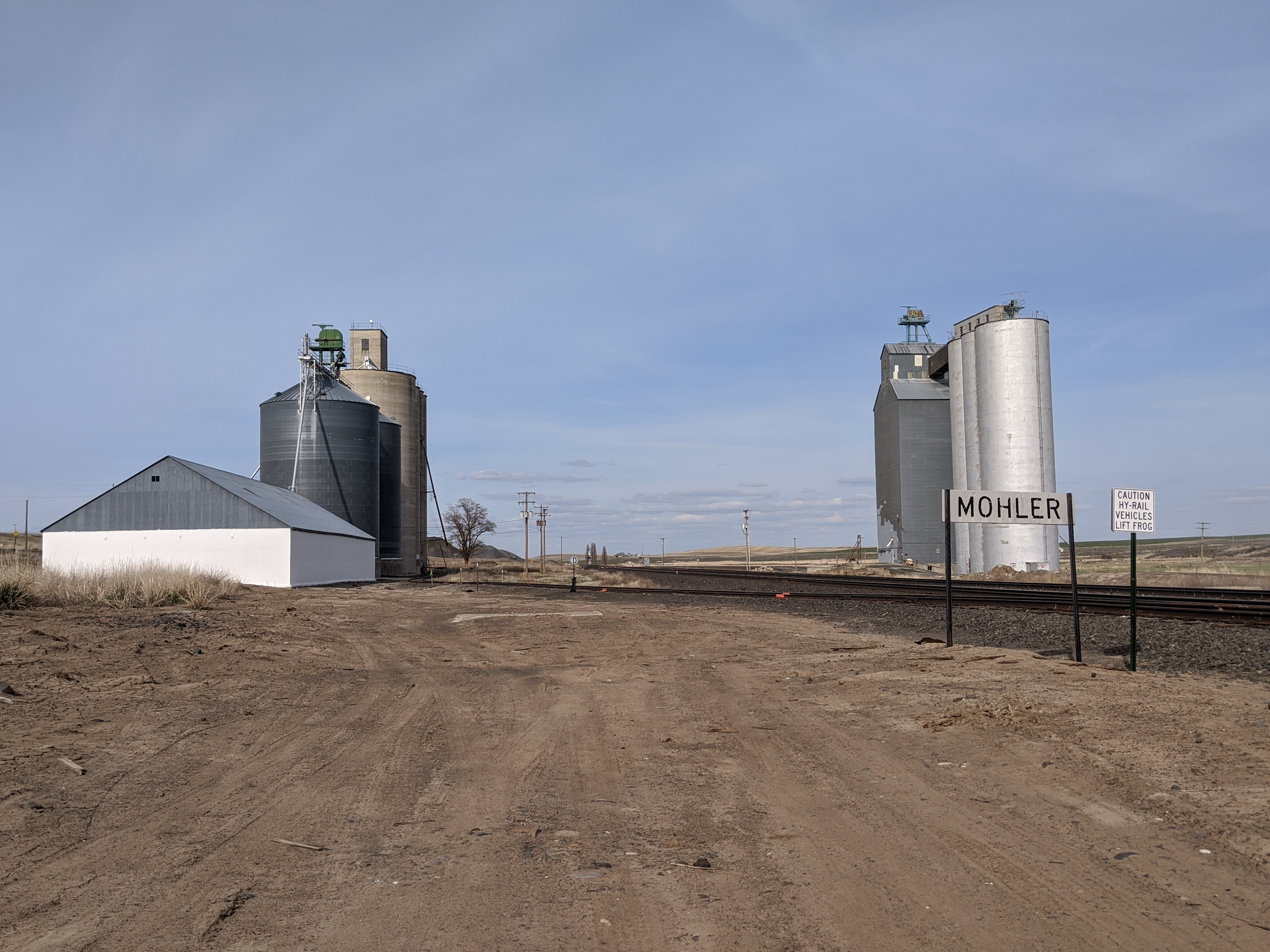
- Downtown Mohler

- Location within Washington (state) Location within the United States
- Coordinates: 47°24′18″N 118°19′45″W
- Country: United States
- State: Washington
- County: Lincoln
- Elevation: 1,995 ft (608 m)
- Time zone: UTC-8 (Pacific (PST))
  - Summer (DST): UTC-7 (PDT)
- ZIP code: 99154
- Area code: 509
- GNIS feature ID: 1511160

Mohler is an unincorporated community in Lincoln County, Washington, United States. Named for early stagecoach driver Morgan Mohler, Mohler is 6.5 miles (10.5 km) southwest of Harrington. Mohler has a post office with ZIP code 99154.

== Climate ==
According to the Köppen Climate Classification system, Mohler has a semi-arid climate, abbreviated "BSk" on climate maps.
