= Mary Carolyn Davies =

American poet, short story writer, playwright

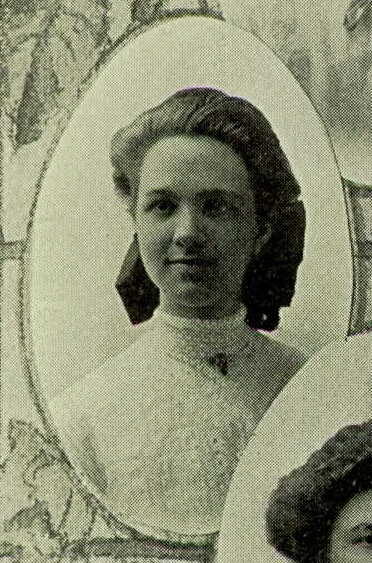
- Born: 1888; Sprague
- Died: 19 May 1974
- Education: Washington High School, University of California, Berkeley
- Occupations: Poet, playwright, short story writer

Mary Carolyn Davies (1888–1974) was an American writer from Sprague, Washington. She was a poet, short story writer, and playwright. She lived for a period in New York, where she was a participant of several writing soirées. She later moved back to Oregon, where she led writing organizations. She again moved back to New York in the 1930s, and after this, she was no longer in the public eye. By 1940, she was destitute and suffering from malnutrition and anemia. However, when her plight was discovered by the public, she received medical care and lived until 1974.

== Early life ==
Davies was born in Sprague, Washington, and moved to Portland, Oregon, at the age of 12. She graduated high school in 1910, taught for a year, and enrolled at University of California at Berkeley in 1911.

== Career ==
While at Berkeley, Davies won both the Bohemian Club prize and Emily Chamberlin Cook Prize for Poetry. She was the first woman to win the former, and the freshman to win the latter. After a year, she left college and moved to New York. After settling in New York, she was destitute, and resorted to writing stories and poetry to make ends meet and survive. Much of her productive output from this period was described by poet Louis Untermeyer as "hackwork", though he saw genuine art as well.

In New York, she was added to a circle of poets, and was featured among the many soirées (as one participant said) that were held in the club. Participants included Alfred Kreymborg, Marcel Duchamp, and Marianne Moore. In fact, it was Davies who was responsible for bringing Moore to the club; this was described by Kreymborg as Davies being accompanied by "an astonishing person with ... a mellifluous flow of polysyllables which held every man in awe".

Eventually, Davies returned to Portland, and became the president of the state's women's press club in 1920 and of the Northwest Poetry Society in 1924. During the 1920s, her work appeared in several magazines, such as McClure's. Her published books include Drums on our Street: A Book of War Poems (1918), Youth Riding (1919), The Husband Test (1921), and The Skyline Trail: A Book of Western Verse (1924). She also published a play, The Slave with Two Faces (1918), which was staged with actors Dorothy Upjohn, Blanche Hays, Hutchinson Collins, Otto Liveright, Alice Macdougal, and Ida Rauh. It was described by scholar Cheryl Black as in an "abstract or fantastic setting".

In the 1930s, she returned to New York, and fell out of public view.

== Later life and death ==
In 1940, Davies was reported as sick in newspapers throughout the country, which reported that she was living in extreme poverty and suffering from anemia due to malnutrition. However, contributions from friends and anonymous sources brought her back to health and she lived until 1974, when she died on May 19, in a nursing home.

== Legacy ==
The Poetry Society created an award in her name.
