= Creston, Washington =

- Town
- Town of Creston
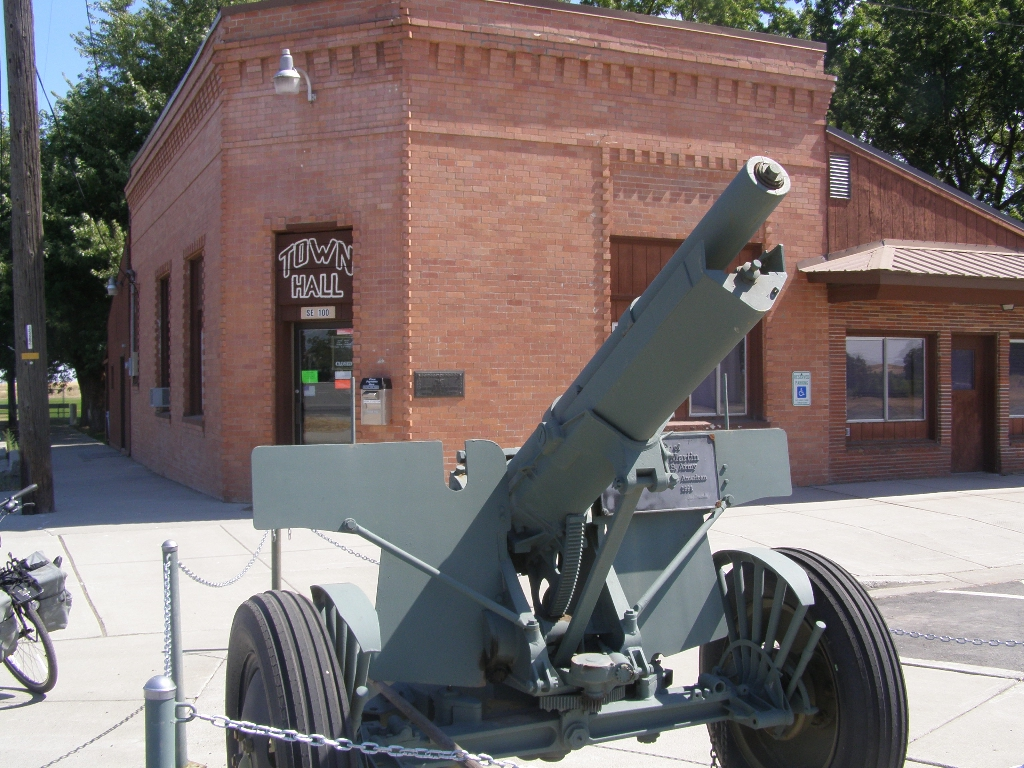

- Flag

- Location of Creston, Washington
- Coordinates: 47°45′29″N 118°31′16″W
- Country: United States
- State: Washington
- County: Lincoln

Government
  - Type: Mayor–council
  - Mayor: Rosario Felice

Area
  - Total: 0.41 sq mi (1.07 km^{2})
  - Land: 0.41 sq mi (1.07 km^{2})
  - Water: 0 sq mi (0.00 km^{2})
- Elevation: 2,441 ft (744 m)

Population (2020)
  - Total: 213
  - Density: 516/sq mi (199/km^{2})
- Time zone: UTC-8 (Pacific (PST))
  - Summer (DST): UTC-7 (PDT)
- ZIP codes: 99117, 99147
- Area code: 509
- FIPS code: 53-15710
- GNIS feature ID: 1504274
- Website: crestonwa.gov

Creston is a town in Lincoln County, Washington, United States. The population was 213 at the 2020 census.

== History ==
Creston sprang up with the arrival of the Central Washington Railroad in 1889. It was so named because of its high altitude; it was thought to be at the highest point (the crest) between Cheney and Coulee City, Washington, along the railroad grade. In the spring of 1890, a town site was platted by H.S. Huson and registered with the state on June 23 of that year. The first structure in town was a small store building moved to the site by Henry Verfurth from the nearby village of Sherman, 5 miles northwest of Creston. A post office was established shortly thereafter whose jurisdiction extended to the Columbia River on the North and the railroad tracks on the South with ten miles East and West. Henry Verfurth was appointed as postmaster. Following the Panic of 1893 and the bankruptcy of the town site owner, Creston remained dormant until a bumper wheat crop in 1897 gave a boost to the regional economy, bringing thousands of new settlers to the region.

The results of the strong harvest were immediate with new businesses, grain elevators, public buildings, churches and the town's first bank and newspaper. At the same time, Creston was given a boost by a new road and ferry connecting it to the rich mineral belts in the nearby Colville Indian Reservation. Between 1900 and 1903, Creston's population doubled to 102. In August 1902, the last surviving member of the infamous Hole in the Wall Gang, Harry Tracy, was shot at a Creston ranch and killed himself there to avoid capture. Creston was officially incorporated on April 20, 1903.

An exceptionally rare tornado struck Creston, Washington, on April 5, 1972, during the regional tornado outbreak that also produced tornadoes in Portland, Oregon, and Vancouver, Washington. The tornado touched down near Hartline before tracking directly through Creston. One injury was reported. The tornado had a path width of 83 yards (76 m) and a path length of 0.1 miles (0.16 km). The starting location was approximately 47.75° N, 118.52° W.

== Geography ==
Creston is located roughly 20 miles (32 km) west of Davenport, the county seat. U.S. Route 2 passes through Creston, connecting it to Wilbur a few miles to the west, with which the town shares a school district. Creston is home to an elementary school and the two towns' middle school, though the Wilbur-Creston High School is located in Wilbur.

Creston is located at the foot of Creston Butte, which lies directly south of the town. The butte rises to 2,800 feet (850 m) above sea level, approximately 350 feet (110 m) higher than the town's elevation.

According to the United States Census Bureau, the town has a total area of 0.45 square miles (1.17 km^{2}), all of it land.

== Climate ==
Climate data for Creston, Washington
Month	Jan	Feb	Mar	Apr	May	Jun	Jul	Aug	Sep	Oct	Nov	Dec	Year
Record high °F (°C)	65 (18)	61 (16)	75 (24)	90 (32)	96 (36)	106 (41)	110 (43)	106 (41)	100 (38)	87 (31)	69 (21)	56 (13)	110 (43)
Mean daily maximum °F (°C)	33 (1)	39 (4)	49 (9)	59 (15)	68 (20)	75 (24)	85 (29)	84 (29)	75 (24)	59 (15)	42 (6)	31 (−1)	58 (15)
Mean daily minimum °F (°C)	20 (−7)	23 (−5)	28 (−2)	32 (0)	39 (4)	45 (7)	51 (11)	50 (10)	42 (6)	33 (1)	26 (−3)	19 (−7)	34 (1)
Record low °F (°C)	−27 (−33)	−30 (−34)	−4 (−20)	10 (−12)	19 (−7)	25 (−4)	25 (−4)	25 (−4)	14 (−10)	1 (−17)	−18 (−28)	−23 (−31)	−30 (−34)
Average precipitation inches (mm)	1.41 (36)	1.04 (26)	1.12 (28)	0.99 (25)	1.28 (33)	0.92 (23)	0.80 (20.3)	0.32 (8.1)	0.48 (12)	0.87 (22)	1.69 (43)	1.77 (45)	12.69 (321.4)

== Demographics ==
Historical population
Census	Pop.	Note	%±
1910	308		—
1920	317		2.9%
1930	216		−31.9%
1940	281		30.1%
1950	268		−4.6%
1960	317		18.3%
1970	325		2.5%
1980	309		−4.9%
1990	230		−25.6%
2000	232		0.9%
2010	236		1.7%
2020	213		−9.7%
U.S. Decennial Census; 2020 Census

=== 2010 census ===
As of the 2010 census, there were 236 people, 114 households, and 67 families residing in the town. The population density was 524.4 inhabitants per square mile (202.5/km^{2}). There were 130 housing units at an average density of 288.9 per square mile (111.5/km^{2}). The racial makeup of the town was 94.5% White, 1.7% Native American, 0.4% Asian, and 3.4% from two or more races.

There were 114 households, of which 16.7% had children under the age of 18 living with them, 46.5% were married couples living together, 5.3% had a female householder with no husband present, 7.0% had a male householder with no wife present, and 41.2% were non-families. 36.8% of all households were made up of individuals, and 21.9% had someone living alone who was 65 years of age or older. The average household size was 2.07 and the average family size was 2.66.

The median age in the town was 51.5 years. 14.8% of residents were under the age of 18; 5.6% were between the ages of 18 and 24; 18.7% were from 25 to 44; 32.6% were from 45 to 64; and 28.4% were 65 years of age or older. The gender makeup of the town was 50.4% male and 49.6% female.

=== 2000 census ===
As of the 2000 census, there were 232 people, 115 households, and 64 families residing in the town. The population density was 524.5 people per square mile (203.6/km^{2}). There were 131 housing units at an average density of 296.2 per square mile (115.0/km^{2}). The racial makeup of the town was 92.67% White, 0.86% African American, 3.45% Native American, and 3.02% from two or more races. Hispanic or Latino of any race were 0.86% of the population.

There were 115 households, out of which 20.9% had children under the age of 18 living with them, 47.0% were married couples living together, 7.8% had a female householder with no husband present, and 43.5% were non-families. 40.9% of all households were made up of individuals, and 22.6% had someone living alone who was 65 years of age or older. The average household size was 2.02 and the average family size was 2.71.

In the town, the population was spread out, with 19.4% under the age of 18, 5.2% from 18 to 24, 21.1% from 25 to 44, 27.6% from 45 to 64, and 26.7% who were 65 years of age or older. The median age was 48 years. For every 100 females, there were 98.3 males. For every 100 females age 18 and over, there were 79.8 males.

The median income for a household in the town was $25,417, and the median income for a family was $33,250. Males had a median income of $30,833 versus $18,750 for females. The per capita income for the town was $13,830. About 15.4% of families and 20.0% of the population were below the poverty line, including 27.9% of those under the age of eighteen and 20.0% of those 65 or over.

== Education ==
The Creston School District maintains the Creston Elementary and Wilbur-Creston 7-8th grade. The 9-12 grade students are maintained in Wilbur-Creston Cooperative High school.
