= Davenport Municipal Airport (Washington) =

Airport in Washington, United States

Davenport Airport Davenport Municipal Airport
- IATA: none; ICAO: none; FAA LID: 68S

Summary
- Airport type: Public
- Owner: City of Davenport
- Serves: Davenport, Washington
- Elevation AMSL: 2,421 ft (738 m)
- Coordinates: 47°39′13″N 118°10′08″W

Map
- Location of airport in Washington 68S (the United States)

Runways
Direction	Length		Surface
Direction	ft	m	Surface
5/23	2,747	837	Asphalt
3/21	2,271	692	Gravel

Statistics (2010)
- Aircraft operations: 7,000
- Based aircraft: 13
- Source: Federal Aviation Administration

Davenport Airport (FAA LID: 68S), also known as Davenport Municipal Airport, is a city-owned, public-use airport located one nautical mile (2 km) west of the central business district of Davenport, a city in Lincoln County, Washington, United States. It is included in the National Plan of Integrated Airport Systems for 2011–2015, which categorized it as a general aviation facility.

== Facilities and aircraft ==
Davenport Airport covers an area of 35 acres (14 ha) at an elevation of 2,421 feet (738 m) above mean sea level. It has one runway. Runway 5/23 is 2,747 by 50 feet (837 x 15 m) with an asphalt surface. It also has an additional runway that was closed by the FAA and is not maintained. This runway, runway 3/21, is 2,271 by 45 feet (692 x 14 m) with a gravel surface.

For the 12-month period ending June 28, 2010, the airport had 7,000 general aviation aircraft operations, an average of 19 per day. At that time there were 13 aircraft based at this airport: 85% single-engine and 15% ultralight.

== See also ==
- List of airports in Washington
