= Telford, Washington =

Unincorporated community in Washington, United States

- Location within Washington (state) Location within the United States
- Coordinates: 47°41′40″N 118°24′26″W
- Country: United States
- State: Washington
- County: Lincoln
- Elevation: 2,326 ft (709 m)
- Time zone: UTC-8 (Pacific (PST))
  - Summer (DST): UTC-7 (PDT)
- ZIP code: 99122
- Area code: 509
- GNIS feature ID: 1511563

Telford is a ghost town in Lincoln County, in the U.S. state of Washington.

== History ==
A post office called Telford was established in 1909, and remained in operation until 1917. The community was named after M. A. Telford, a local cattleman.
