= Creston School District =

School district in Washington, United States

Creston School District is the K-12 school district in the Eastern Washington farming community of Creston, Washington. Due to the small size of the town, the elementary and junior high are in the same building; and the Creston Elementary School has combined classrooms: K, 1st/2nd, 3rd/4th, and 5th/6th. An academic co-op was started in 2016 between Creston School District and the nearby Wilbur School District, allowing all Creston High School students to attend Wilbur-Creston High School in Wilbur and all Wilbur Junior High students to attend Wilbur-Creston Junior High in Creston. Even before the academic co-op, the two school districts enjoyed a sports co-op (Wilbur-Creston Wildcats) that has been in place since 1985.

== Schools ==
- Creston Elementary School
- Wilbur-Creston Junior High School

== Demographics ==
The majority of the students reside outside of Creston. The district buses students from Deer Meadows, Hawk Creek, Lincoln, Seven Bays, and Sterling Valley. A small number of students are from towns outside the district, such as Davenport, Harrington, and Electric City. The co-op between Wilbur and Creston means that all high school students are bused to Wilbur, while all junior high students are bused to Creston.

== Faculty ==
The Faculty at Creston includes 19 staff members

== Curriculum ==
According to the Creston School Board, the district aims to provide a curriculum that meets students' educational needs while preparing them for life after high school.
