= Lilienthal Mountain =

Mountain in Washington (state), United States

Coordinates: 47°54′37″N 118°14′00″W

Lilienthal Mountain is a 3,550-foot (1,080 m) or 3,568-foot (1,088 m) peak on the Columbia Plateau in Lincoln County, in the U.S. state of Washington. It is the highest point in Lincoln County.
