= Ewan, Washington =

Unincorporated community in Washington, United States

- Unincorporated community
- Location within Washington (state)
- Coordinates: 47°07′01″N 117°44′06″W
- Country: United States
- State: Washington
- County: Whitman
- Elevation: 1,739 ft (530 m)
- Time zone: UTC-8 (Pacific (PST))
  - Summer (DST): UTC-7 (PDT)
- Area code: 509
- GNIS feature ID: 1510956

Ewan is an unincorporated community in Whitman County, Washington, United States. Ewan is located on Washington State Route 23 7.4 miles (11.9 km) west-northwest of St. John.

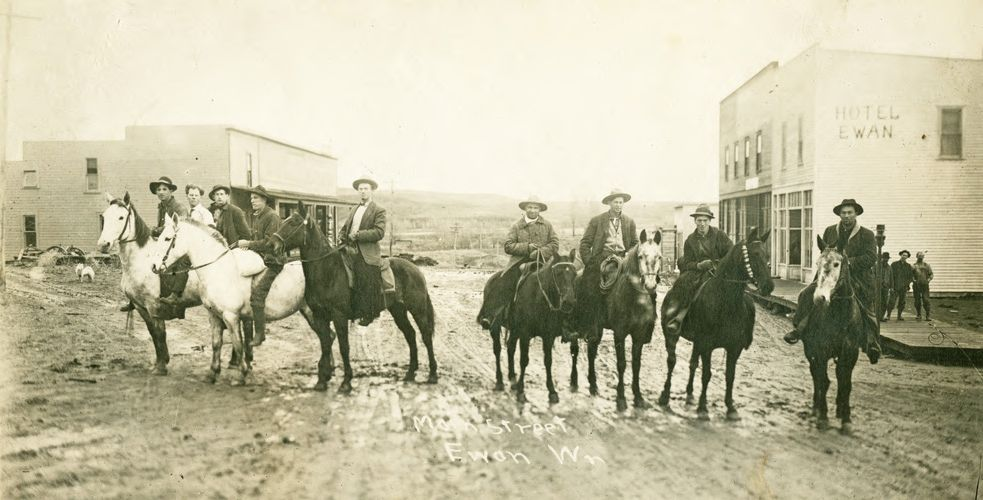
Ewan, Washington main street, circa 1914
