= Sprague, Washington =

Sprague
- City
- Sprague, Washington
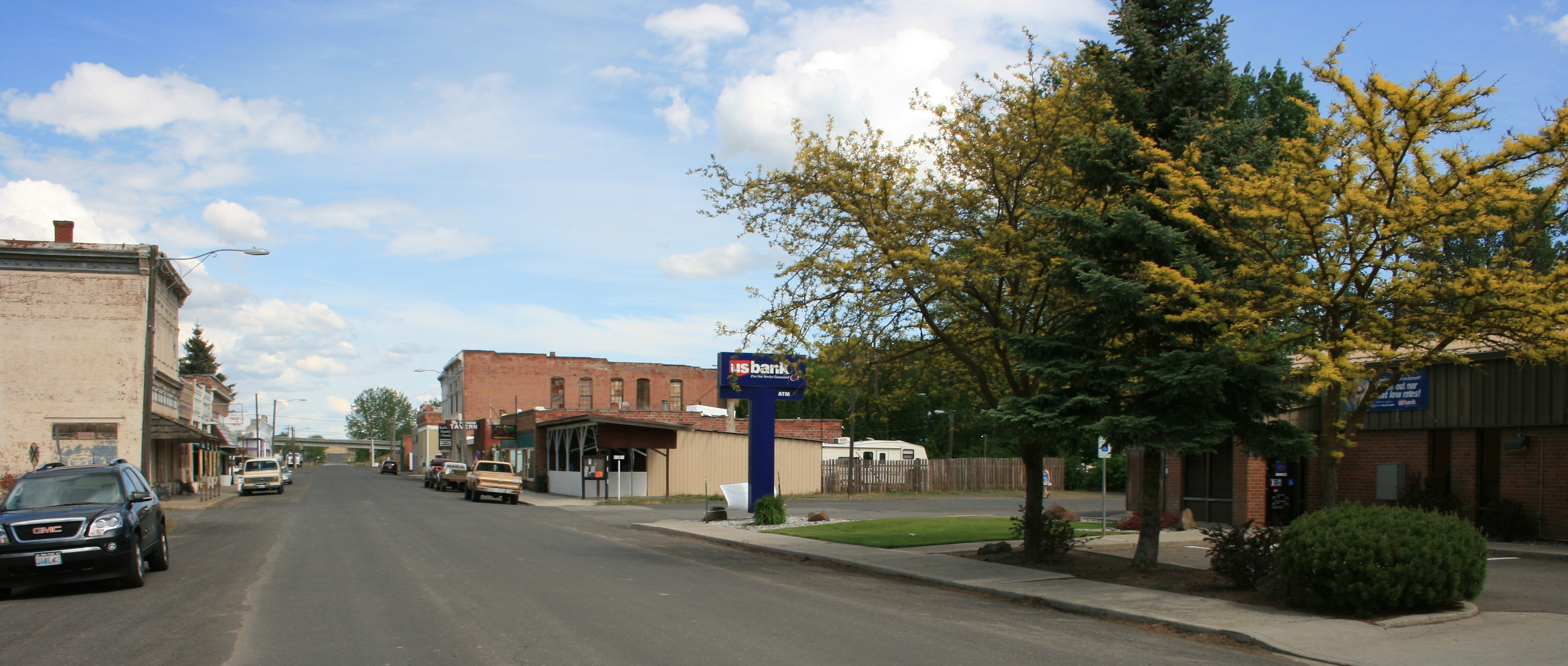

- Location of Sprague, Washington
- Coordinates: 47°17′56″N 117°58′39″W
- Country: United States
- State: Washington
- County: Lincoln

Government
  - Type: Mayor–council
  - Mayor: Lucas Becker

Area
  - Total: 1.05 sq mi (2.72 km^{2})
  - Land: 1.05 sq mi (2.72 km^{2})
  - Water: 0 sq mi (0.00 km^{2})
- Elevation: 1,900 ft (580 m)

Population (2020)
  - Total: 495
  - Density: 471/sq mi (182/km^{2})
- Time zone: UTC-8 (Pacific (PST))
  - Summer (DST): UTC-7 (PDT)
- ZIP code: 99032
- Area code: 509
- FIPS code: 53-67175
- GNIS feature ID: 1508614
- Website: sprague-wa.us

Sprague SPRAYG; is a small city in Lincoln County, Washington, United States. The population was 495 at the 2020 census. The city was platted in 1880 and named for former American Civil War Union general John Wilson Sprague.

== History ==
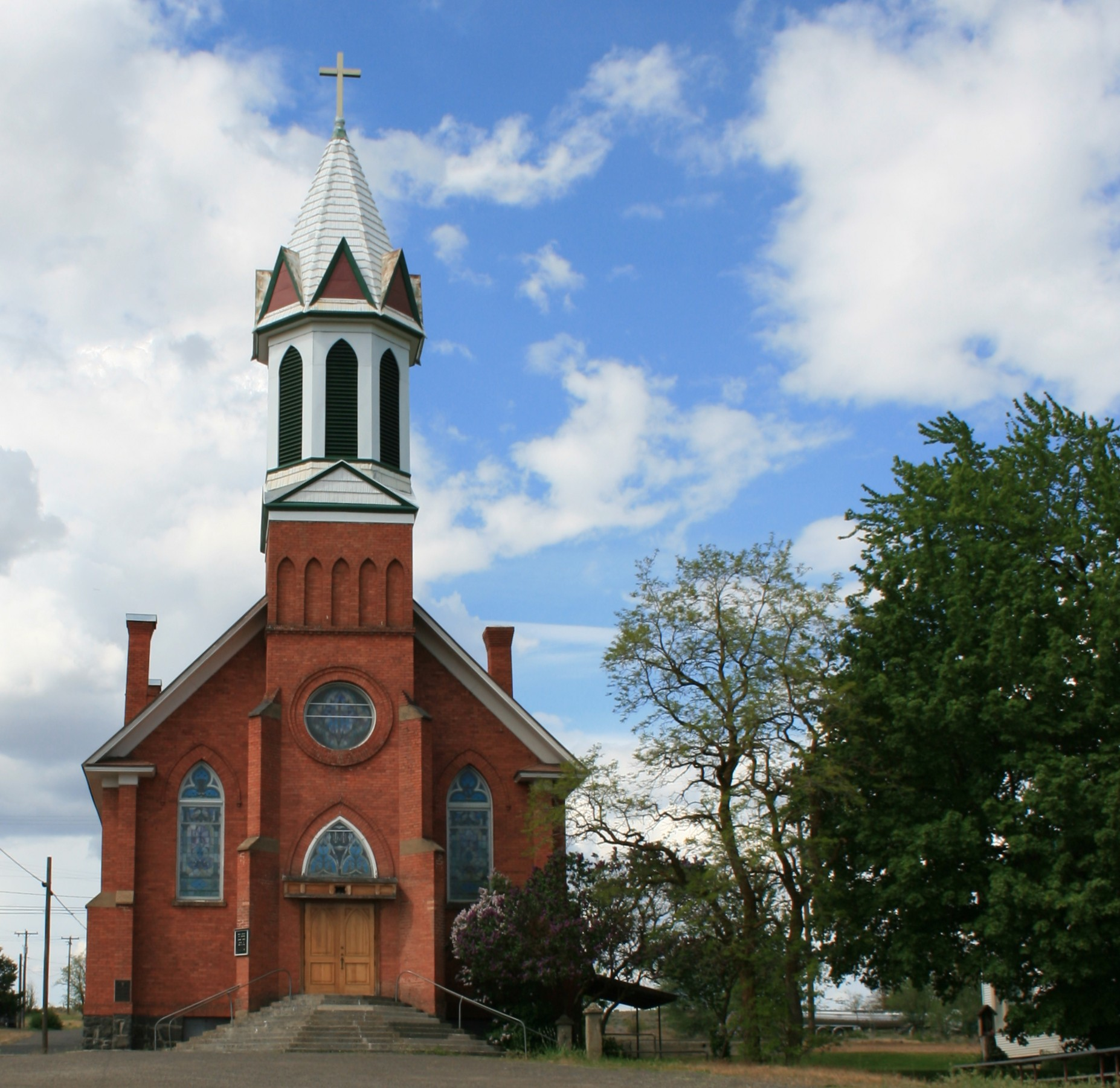
Mary Queen of Heaven Catholic Church in Sprague, Washington.

Sprague was first settled by William Newman, who established an inn at the location.

Sprague was officially incorporated on November 28, 1883. Originally called Hoodooville after William Burrows, a local character called Hoodoo Billy, the name was changed to honor General John W. Sprague, a railroad executive.

Sprague was destroyed by fire on August 3, 1895. The fire and subsequent decision by the Northern Pacific Railroad to not rebuild in the town resulted in the relocation of the county seat, held by Sprague after an election in 1884, to Davenport in 1896 after a controversial vote.

Mary Queen of Heaven Catholic Church in Sprague, Washington was originally built in 1883. The current church was built in a Gothic Revival style and erected in 1902, just south of the site of the original church and blessed by the Bishop of Nesqually. It was placed on the National Register of Historic Places by the U.S. Department of Interior in 1990.

== Geography ==
Sprague is located at 47°17′56″N 117°58′39″W (47.298974, -117.977532). It is at the junction of Interstate 90 and State Route 23, northeast of Sprague Lake. It is approximately 23 miles (37 km) from Ritzville and 36 miles (58 km) from Spokane.

According to the United States Census Bureau, the city has a total area of 0.63 square miles (1.63 km^{2}), all of it land.

== Climate ==
According to the Köppen climate classification system, Sprague is located in the transition zone between a dry-summer humid continental climate, and a semi-arid climate.

Climate data for Sprague
Month	Jan	Feb	Mar	Apr	May	Jun	Jul	Aug	Sep	Oct	Nov	Dec	Year
Record high °F (°C)	59 (15)	64 (18)	75 (24)	90 (32)	99 (37)	106 (41)	109 (43)	110 (43)	102 (39)	92 (33)	72 (22)	62 (17)	110 (43)
Mean daily maximum °F (°C)	34.1 (1.2)	41.6 (5.3)	51.1 (10.6)	60.8 (16.0)	70 (21)	77.6 (25.3)	87.1 (30.6)	85.7 (29.8)	76.3 (24.6)	62.4 (16.9)	45.4 (7.4)	37.4 (3.0)	60.8 (16.0)
Mean daily minimum °F (°C)	18.7 (−7.4)	24.7 (−4.1)	29 (−2)	34.1 (1.2)	40.7 (4.8)	46.7 (8.2)	51.1 (10.6)	49.3 (9.6)	42.4 (5.8)	34.3 (1.3)	27.8 (−2.3)	23.4 (−4.8)	35.2 (1.8)
Record low °F (°C)	−31 (−35)	−33 (−36)	0 (−18)	14 (−10)	21 (−6)	27 (−3)	31 (−1)	31 (−1)	20 (−7)	4 (−16)	−15 (−26)	−21 (−29)	−33 (−36)
Average precipitation inches (mm)	1.74 (44)	1.45 (37)	1.26 (32)	1.03 (26)	1.10 (28)	1.00 (25)	0.43 (11)	0.47 (12)	0.77 (20)	1.18 (30)	2.02 (51)	2.03 (52)	14.48 (368)
Average snowfall inches (cm)	8.3 (21)	3.8 (9.7)	1.4 (3.6)	0.1 (0.25)	0 (0)	0 (0)	0 (0)	0 (0)	0 (0)	0.1 (0.25)	2.6 (6.6)	6.5 (17)	22.9 (58)
Average precipitation days	10	8	8	6	7	6	3	3	4	7	10	11	83

== Demographics ==
Historical population
Census	Pop.	Note	%±
1890	1,689		—
1900	695		−58.9%
1910	1,110		59.7%
1920	822		−25.9%
1930	639		−22.3%
1940	641		0.3%
1950	598		−6.7%
1960	597		−0.2%
1970	550		−7.9%
1980	473		−14.0%
1990	410		−13.3%
2000	490		19.5%
2010	446		−9.0%
2020	495		11.0%
U.S. Decennial Census; 2020 Census

=== 2020 census ===
As of the 2020 census, Sprague had a population of 495 and a median age of 44.4 years. 21.2% of residents were under the age of 18 and 20.8% were 65 years of age or older, with 94.9 males for every 100 females and 88.4 males for every 100 females age 18 and over.

0.0% of residents lived in urban areas, while 100.0% lived in rural areas.

There were 206 households in Sprague, of which 35.9% had children under the age of 18 living in them. Of all households, 42.7% were married-couple households, 22.8% were households with a male householder and no spouse or partner present, and 22.3% were households with a female householder and no spouse or partner present. About 26.3% of all households were made up of individuals and 13.1% had someone living alone who was 65 years of age or older.

There were 230 housing units, of which 10.4% were vacant. The homeowner vacancy rate was 0.0% and the rental vacancy rate was 0.0%.

Racial composition as of the 2020 census
Race	Number	Percent
White	428	86.5%
Black or African American	6	1.2%
American Indian and Alaska Native	8	1.6%
Asian	0	0.0%
Native Hawaiian and Other Pacific Islander	0	0.0%
Some other race	3	0.6%
Two or more races	50	10.1%
Hispanic or Latino (of any race)	14	2.8%

=== 2010 census ===
As of the 2010 census, there were 447 people, 197 households, and 128 families residing in the city. The population density was 707.9 inhabitants per square mile (273.3/km^{2}). There were 236 housing units at an average density of 374.6 per square mile (144.6/km^{2}). The racial makeup of the city was 94.2% White, 2.0% Native American, 1.6% Asian, 0.4% from other races, and 1.8% from two or more races. Hispanic or Latino of any race were 3.6% of the population.

There were 197 households, of which 26.4% had children under the age of 18 living with them, 51.8% were married couples living together, 9.1% had a female householder with no husband present, 4.1% had a male householder with no wife present, and 35.0% were non-families. 32.5% of all households were made up of individuals, and 15.2% had someone living alone who was 65 years of age or older. The average household size was 2.26 and the average family size was 2.81.

The median age in the city was 46.5 years. 23.1% of residents were under the age of 18; 4.9% were between the ages of 18 and 24; 19.9% were from 25 to 44; 32.5% were from 45 to 64; and 19.5% were 65 years of age or older. The gender makeup of the city was 51.1% male and 48.9% female.

=== 2000 census ===
As of the 2000 census, there were 490 people, 216 households, and 130 families residing in the city. The population density was 780.8 people per square mile (300.3/km^{2}). There were 242 housing units at an average density of 385.6 per square mile (148.3/km^{2}). The racial makeup of the city was 93.47% White, 2.65% Native American, 0.41% Asian, 1.63% from other races, and 1.84% from two or more races. Hispanic or Latino of any race were 2.65% of the population.

There were 216 households, out of which 26.4% had children under the age of 18 living with them, 49.5% were married couples living together, 7.4% had a female householder with no husband present, and 39.4% were non-families. 32.9% of all households were made up of individuals, and 14.4% had someone living alone who was 65 years of age or older. The average household size was 2.27 and the average family size was 2.92.

In the city, the population was spread out, with 24.5% under the age of 18, 6.5% from 18 to 24, 21.6% from 25 to 44, 26.3% from 45 to 64, and 21.0% who were 65 years of age or older. The median age was 43 years. For every 100 females, there were 95.2 males. For every 100 females age 18 and over, there were 91.7 males.

The median income for a household in the city was $29,079, and the median income for a family was $31,750. Males had a median income of $30,833 versus $21,875 for females. The per capita income for the city was $15,912. About 8.9% of families and 13.2% of the population were below the poverty line, including 21.4% of those under age 18 and 6.6% of those age 65 or over.

== Notable people ==
- Scott Buchanan (1895-1968), American philosopher and educator
- Eugene E. Lindsey, World War II naval pilot
- Mary Carolyn Davies (1888 Sprague, WA -1974 Manhattan, NY), Poet, author of "A Casualty List" from The Drums in Our Street, 1918
- William Fentress Thompson (1865-1926), publisher of newspapers across the West, including the Sprague Independent
