= Davenport, Washington =

- City
- City of Davenport
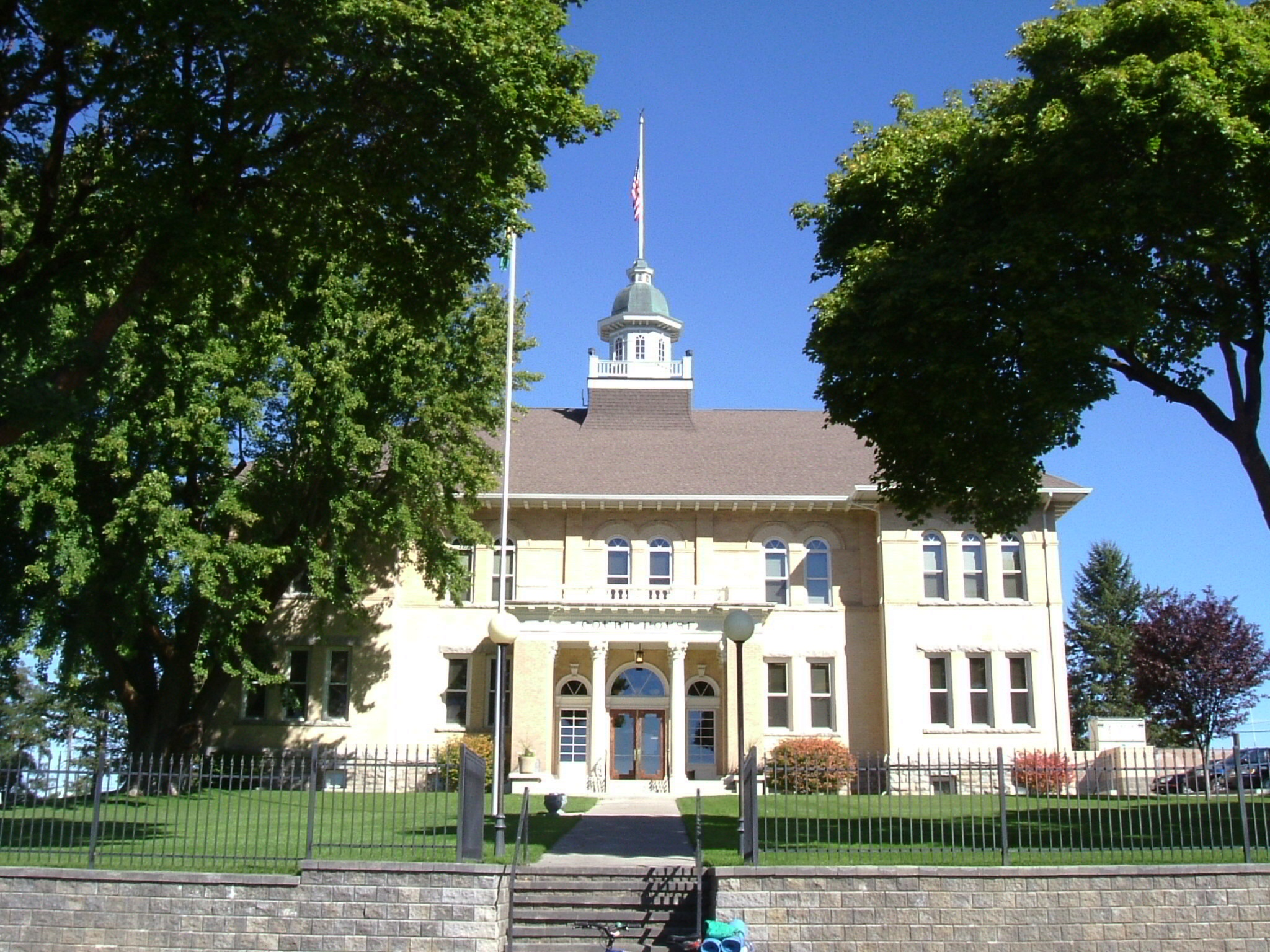
- Lincoln County Courthouse

- Location of Davenport, Washington
- Coordinates: 47°39′4″N 118°9′6″W
- Country: United States
- State: Washington
- County: Lincoln

Government
  - Type: Mayor–council
  - Mayor: Jon Chapman

Area
  - Total: 1.67 sq mi (4.32 km^{2})
  - Land: 1.67 sq mi (4.32 km^{2})
  - Water: 0 sq mi (0.00 km^{2})
- Elevation: 2,375 ft (724 m)

Population (2020)
  - Total: 1,703
  - Density: 1,021/sq mi (394.2/km^{2})
- Time zone: UTC−8 (Pacific (PST))
  - Summer (DST): UTC−7 (PDT)
- ZIP code: 99122
- Area code: 509
- FIPS code: 53-16795
- GNIS feature ID: 1504329
- Website: davenportwa.us

Davenport is the county seat of and the largest city in Lincoln County, Washington, United States. The population was 1,703 at the 2020 census. As the seat of government for the county and its largest population center, Davenport serves as an important hub for business, medical and educational services in Lincoln County.

== History ==
Prior to European settlement, the area around what would become Davenport was home to the Lower Band of the Spokane. The location was also along a popular east-west trade route, and the spring at present day Davenport was seen as an oasis and place for rest and camping along the journey.

That trail would eventually bring white settlers to the area, with prospectors passing through on their way to goldfields in Montana. Like the Spokane before them, these settlers used the springs at the present site of Davenport to collect water, rest and camp. The setting of the springs in the otherwise semi-arid region attracted some of these new arrivals to settle at the location, and in 1880 Aloysius Harry Harker became the first non-native permanent settler at the location, with John and Emma Eads Nicholls arriving soon after. The settlement was located at the springs and known as Cottonwood Springs. John C. Davenport founded a separate settlement on higher ground nearby in 1883, which was destroyed by fire the following year. Davenport's settlement relocated to Cottonwood Springs, taking Davenport's name with it. The city was made the county seat of Lincoln County on December 15, 1896, after an election that had chosen Davenport over then-seat Sprague, which had been destroyed in a fire, and Harrington.

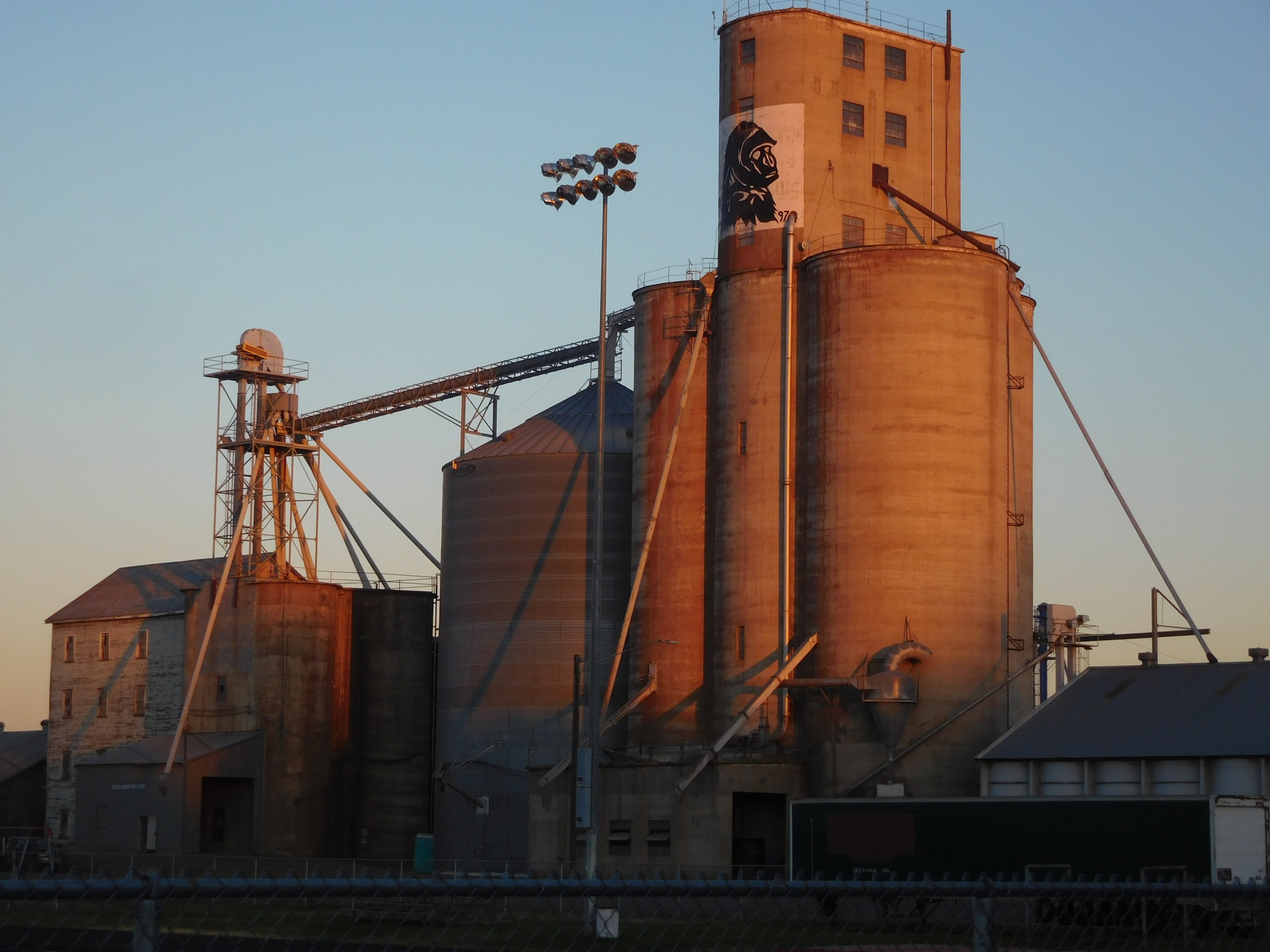
Grain elevators along the railroad in Davenport

Davenport gained early prominence in the north central part of the Columbia Basin of eastern Washington with the arrival of the Washington Central branch of the transcontinental Northern Pacific Railway (NP) railroad line, which reached Davenport in February 1889. The Seattle Lake Shore & Eastern Railway (SLS&E) arrived later that year. A branch line of the Great Northern Railway (GN) was built to Davenport from Bluestem in the 1920s. Davenport's train depot, built in 1889 with the arrival of the railroads, lasted almost 100 years before being demolished in 1988.

Primary State Highway #2 (a.k.a. "Sunset Highway") closely followed the CW railroad from Coulee City through Davenport to Spokane. The route is now known as U.S. Route 2, but does not follow the original Sunset Highway in many places. Primary State Highway #7 also intersected with PSH #2 in Davenport, and is now part of State Route 28. PSH #22 ran north from Davenport to the Canada–US border near Northport. This is State Route 25 now.

== Geography ==
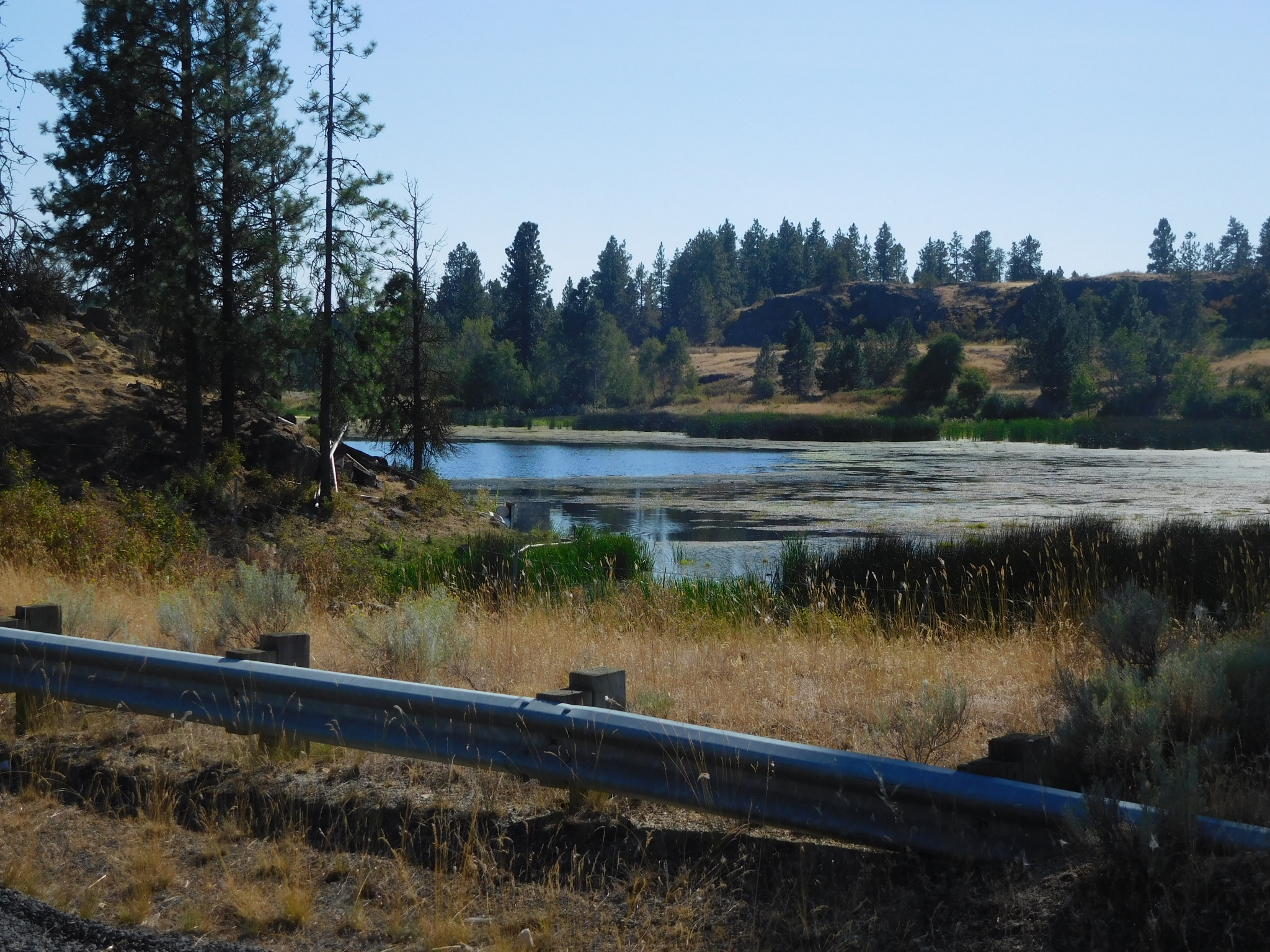
Channeled Scabland terrain west of Davenport

Davenport is located at 47°39′4″N 118°9′6″W (47.651157, -118.151627). Davenport itself is largely flat, lying in the shallow valley of Cottonwood Creek, but the surrounding region is characterized by the Channeled Scablands scoured by the Missoula Floods during the last ice age. Davenport lies on the northern edge of the scablands, with more familiar drainage patterns taking over the terrain a few miles to the north of the city. Cottonwood Creek is an example of those more typical drainage patterns, as it flows northwest into the Columbia River at Hawk Creek Bay. Crystal Spring, which helps feed the creek, is located near the center of town.

Davenport is served by U.S. Route 2, which runs through the heart of the city. U.S. Route 2 connects Davenport with the region's primary city, Spokane, which is located 35 miles to the east. Two state highways also serve Davenport. State Route 28 has its eastern terminus in Davenport, connecting the city the rural areas to its southwest. State Route 25 has its southern terminus in Davenport, from which it stretches north to the Canadian border.

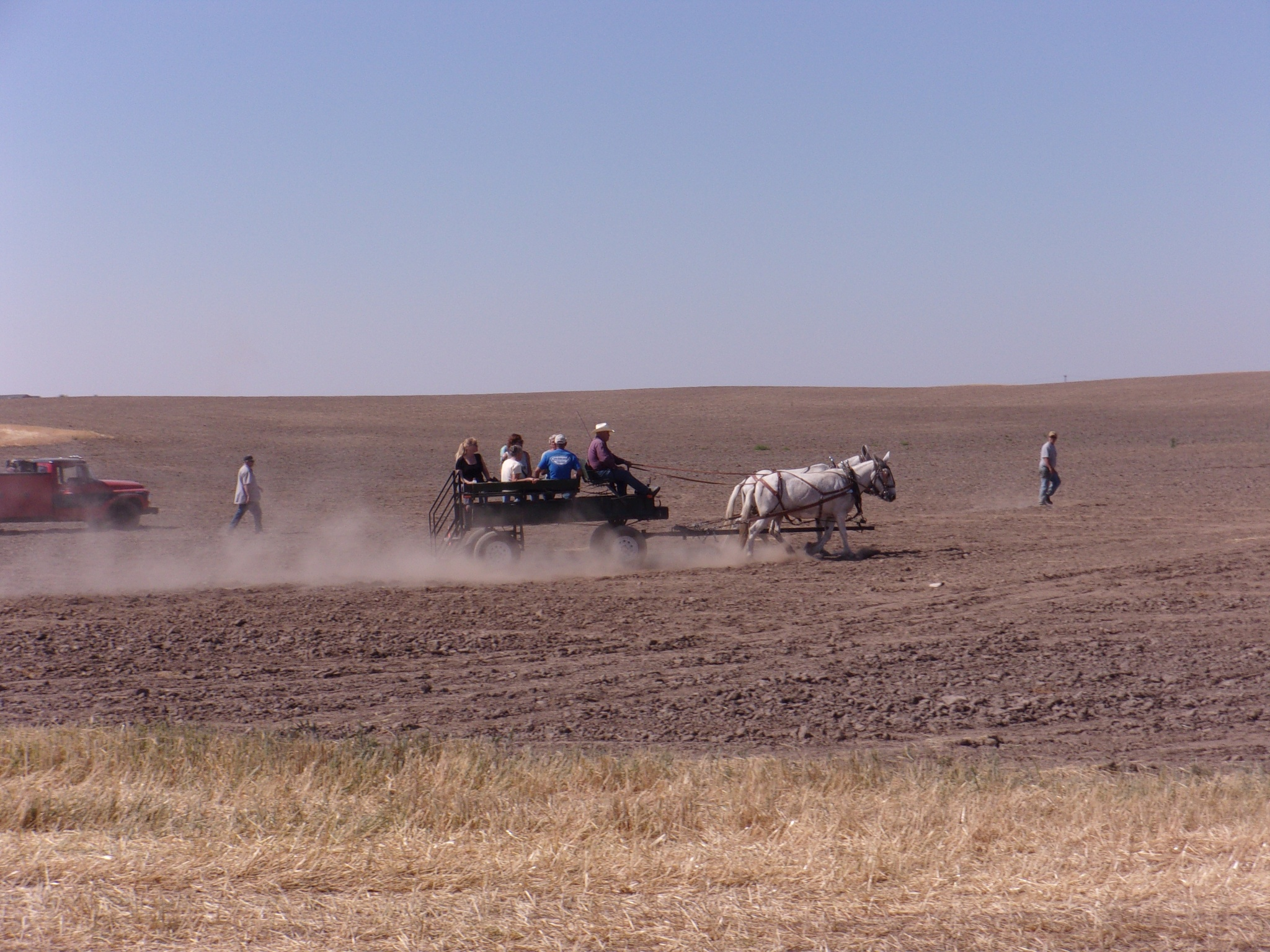
Vintage Harvest Festival in Davenport

Davenport is centrally located in the northern wheat belt of the Columbia Basin, where dryland wheat farming on the hills not washed away in the great Missoula Floods some 14,000 years ago, is critical to the agricultural economy of the region. Davenport Union Warehouse and Odessa Union Warehouse operate multiple elevators of varying age and design on the southern part of the city. A few of these structures date to the early days of the city. Davenport still serves as a central collection point for wheat, with most of it shipped out by truck or railcar. While most of the wheat goes to export, some of it does find its way to the ADM flour mills in Spokane and Cheney. Locally grown barley also finds its way to various west coast breweries and other users.

According to the United States Census Bureau, the city has a total area of 1.82 square miles (4.71 km^{2}), all of it land.

=== Climate ===
Davenport experiences a dry-summer continental climate (Köppen Dsb).

Climate data for Davenport, Washington (1991–2020 normals, extremes 1893–1894, 1909–present)
Month	Jan	Feb	Mar	Apr	May	Jun	Jul	Aug	Sep	Oct	Nov	Dec	Year
Record high °F (°C)	58 (14)	60 (16)	73 (23)	90 (32)	94 (34)	107 (42)	105 (41)	103 (39)	100 (38)	86 (30)	68 (20)	57 (14)	107 (42)
Mean daily maximum °F (°C)	31.7 (−0.2)	37.1 (2.8)	46.7 (8.2)	55.9 (13.3)	65.4 (18.6)	72.1 (22.3)	82.3 (27.9)	82.5 (28.1)	72.6 (22.6)	57.1 (13.9)	41.5 (5.3)	31.2 (−0.4)	56.3 (13.5)
Daily mean °F (°C)	25.5 (−3.6)	29.1 (−1.6)	36.8 (2.7)	43.6 (6.4)	52.0 (11.1)	57.7 (14.3)	65.1 (18.4)	65.1 (18.4)	56.5 (13.6)	44.0 (6.7)	33.2 (0.7)	25.2 (−3.8)	44.5 (6.9)
Mean daily minimum °F (°C)	19.3 (−7.1)	21.2 (−6.0)	26.9 (−2.8)	31.2 (−0.4)	38.5 (3.6)	43.4 (6.3)	47.9 (8.8)	47.7 (8.7)	40.3 (4.6)	30.9 (−0.6)	25.0 (−3.9)	19.2 (−7.1)	32.6 (0.3)
Record low °F (°C)	−28 (−33)	−27 (−33)	−9 (−23)	10 (−12)	16 (−9)	25 (−4)	29 (−2)	29 (−2)	17 (−8)	−1 (−18)	−18 (−28)	−23 (−31)	−28 (−33)
Average precipitation inches (mm)	1.73 (44)	0.99 (25)	1.53 (39)	1.11 (28)	1.37 (35)	1.15 (29)	0.42 (11)	0.30 (7.6)	0.49 (12)	1.26 (32)	1.72 (44)	1.90 (48)	13.97 (355)
Average snowfall inches (cm)	7.4 (19)	5.5 (14)	2.2 (5.6)	0.2 (0.51)	0.0 (0.0)	0.0 (0.0)	0.0 (0.0)	0.0 (0.0)	0.0 (0.0)	0.3 (0.76)	4.1 (10)	10.6 (27)	30.3 (77)
Average precipitation days (≥ 0.01 in)	8.2	6.2	8.3	6.2	6.6	6.2	2.6	2.1	3.2	6.0	9.2	9.1	73.9
Average snowy days (≥ 0.1 in)	4.6	2.7	1.4	0.1	0.0	0.0	0.0	0.0	0.0	0.1	2.4	5.5	16.8
Source: NOAA

== Demographics ==
Historical population
Census	Pop.	Note	%±
1890	396		—
1900	1,000		152.5%
1910	1,229		22.9%
1920	1,112		−9.5%
1930	987		−11.2%
1940	1,337		35.5%
1950	1,417		6.0%
1960	1,494		5.4%
1970	1,363		−8.8%
1980	1,559		14.4%
1990	1,502		−3.7%
2000	1,730		15.2%
2010	1,734		0.2%
2020	1,703		−1.8%
U.S. Decennial Census; 2020

=== 2020 census ===
As of the 2020 census, Davenport had a population of 1,703. The median age was 41.9 years. 23.3% of residents were under the age of 18 and 22.8% of residents were 65 years of age or older. For every 100 females there were 95.7 males, and for every 100 females age 18 and over there were 92.1 males age 18 and over.

As of the 2020 census, 0.0% of residents lived in urban areas, while 100.0% lived in rural areas.

As of the 2020 census, there were 685 households in Davenport, of which 29.6% had children under the age of 18 living in them. Of all households, 49.1% were married-couple households, 17.8% were households with a male householder and no spouse or partner present, and 27.0% were households with a female householder and no spouse or partner present. About 29.7% of all households were made up of individuals and 16.3% had someone living alone who was 65 years of age or older.

As of the 2020 census, there were 744 housing units, of which 7.9% were vacant. The homeowner vacancy rate was 1.6% and the rental vacancy rate was 9.2%.

Racial composition as of the 2020 census
Race	Number	Percent
White	1,456	85.5%
Black or African American	5	0.3%
American Indian and Alaska Native	55	3.2%
Asian	14	0.8%
Native Hawaiian and Other Pacific Islander	6	0.4%
Some other race	31	1.8%
Two or more races	136	8.0%
Hispanic or Latino (of any race)	101	5.9%

=== 2010 census ===
As of the 2010 census, there were 1,734 people, 694 households, and 445 families residing in the city. The population density was 952.7 inhabitants per square mile (367.8/km^{2}). There were 750 housing units at an average density of 412.1 per square mile (159.1/km^{2}). The racial makeup of the city was 95.3% White, 0.1% African American, 1.2% Native American, 0.1% Asian, 0.1% Pacific Islander, 0.6% from other races, and 2.6% from two or more races. Hispanic or Latino of any race were 2.7% of the population.

There were 694 households, of which 31.1% had children under the age of 18 living with them, 46.8% were married couples living together, 13.5% had a female householder with no husband present, 3.7% had a male householder with no wife present, and 35.9% were non-families. 31.6% of all households were made up of individuals, and 13.9% had someone living alone who was 65 years of age or older. The average household size was 2.43 and the average family size was 3.03.

The median age in the city was 40 years. 25.5% of residents were under the age of 18; 8.7% were between the ages of 18 and 24; 20.9% were from 25 to 44; 25.9% were from 45 to 64; and 19% were 65 years of age or older. The gender makeup of the city was 47.6% male and 52.4% female.

=== 2000 census ===
As of the 2000 census, there were 1,730 people, 707 households, and 436 families residing in the city. The population density was 1,143.3 people per square mile (442.4/km^{2}). There were 763 housing units at an average density of 504.3 per square mile (195.1/km^{2}). The racial makeup of the city was 97.17% White, 0.29% African American, 0.98% Native American, 0.29% from other races, and 1.27% from two or more races. Hispanic or Latino of any race were 2.25% of the population. 30.0% were of German, 12.1% American, 10.6% English and 6.2% Irish ancestry according to Census 2000. 98.4% spoke English and 1.6% Spanish as their first language.

There were 707 households, out of which 30.8% had children under the age of 18 living with them, 50.1% were married couples living together, 9.2% had a female householder with no husband present, and 38.3% were non-families. 33.8% of all households were made up of individuals, and 18.0% had someone living alone who was 65 years of age or older. The average household size was 2.34 and the average family size was 3.01.

In the city, the population was spread out, with 25.7% under the age of 18, 5.8% from 18 to 24, 24.7% from 25 to 44, 21.7% from 45 to 64, and 22.0% who were 65 years of age or older. The median age was 41 years. For every 100 females, there were 85.2 males. For every 100 females age 18 and over, there were 79.7 males.

The median income for a household in the city was $37,900, and the median income for a family was $47,708. Males had a median income of $34,531 versus $21,875 for females. The per capita income for the city was $20,090. About 8.5% of families and 11.2% of the population were below the poverty line, including 12.9% of those under age 18 and 9.9% of those age 65 or over.

== Community ==
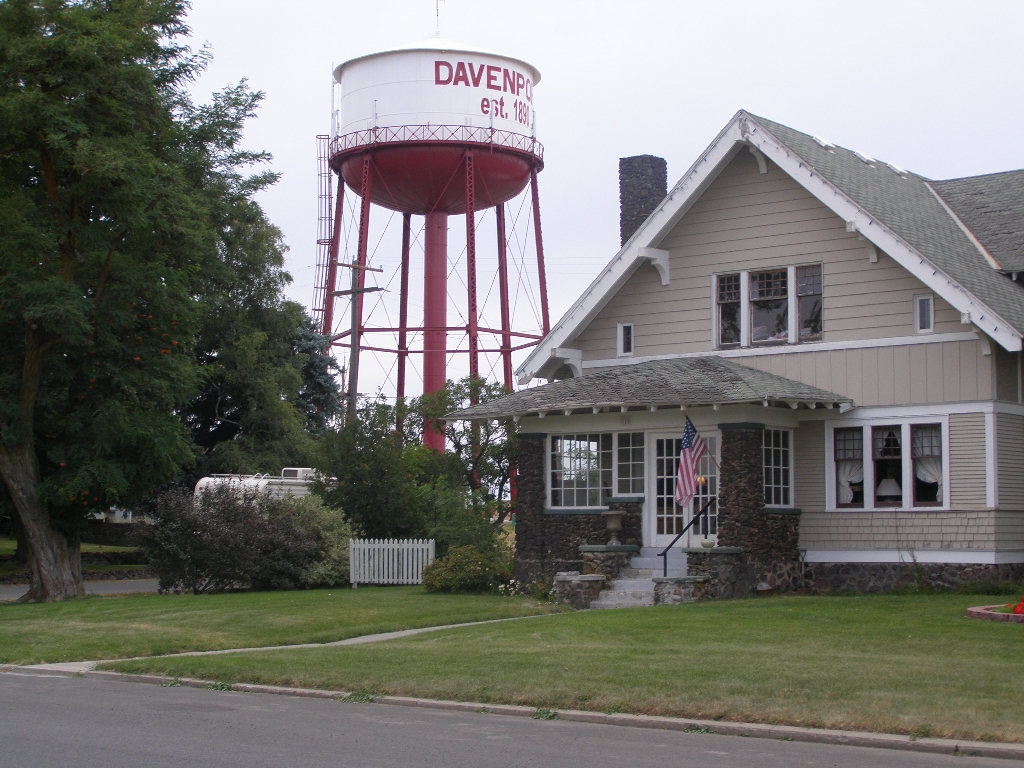
Davenport Water Tower

The Davenport School District Includes Davenport Elementary, Davenport Middle School, and Davenport Senior High School. The mascot is the Davenport Gorilla.

As of 2010, Davenport was served by 12 different churches and was home to a museum, library and city park with a pool. Services in the community include a post office, courthouse, fire station and hospital. The Lincoln County Fairgrounds are located in Davenport, with the annual Lincoln County Fair and Rodeo taking place each summer.

== Transportation ==
Davenport is served by the Davenport Municipal Airport. Eastern Washington Gateway Railroad, U.S. Route 2, State Route 28, and State Route 25.

== See also ==
- Harker Canyon
- Creston, Washington
- Wilbur, Washington
