= Lincoln County, Washington =

County in Washington, United States

- County
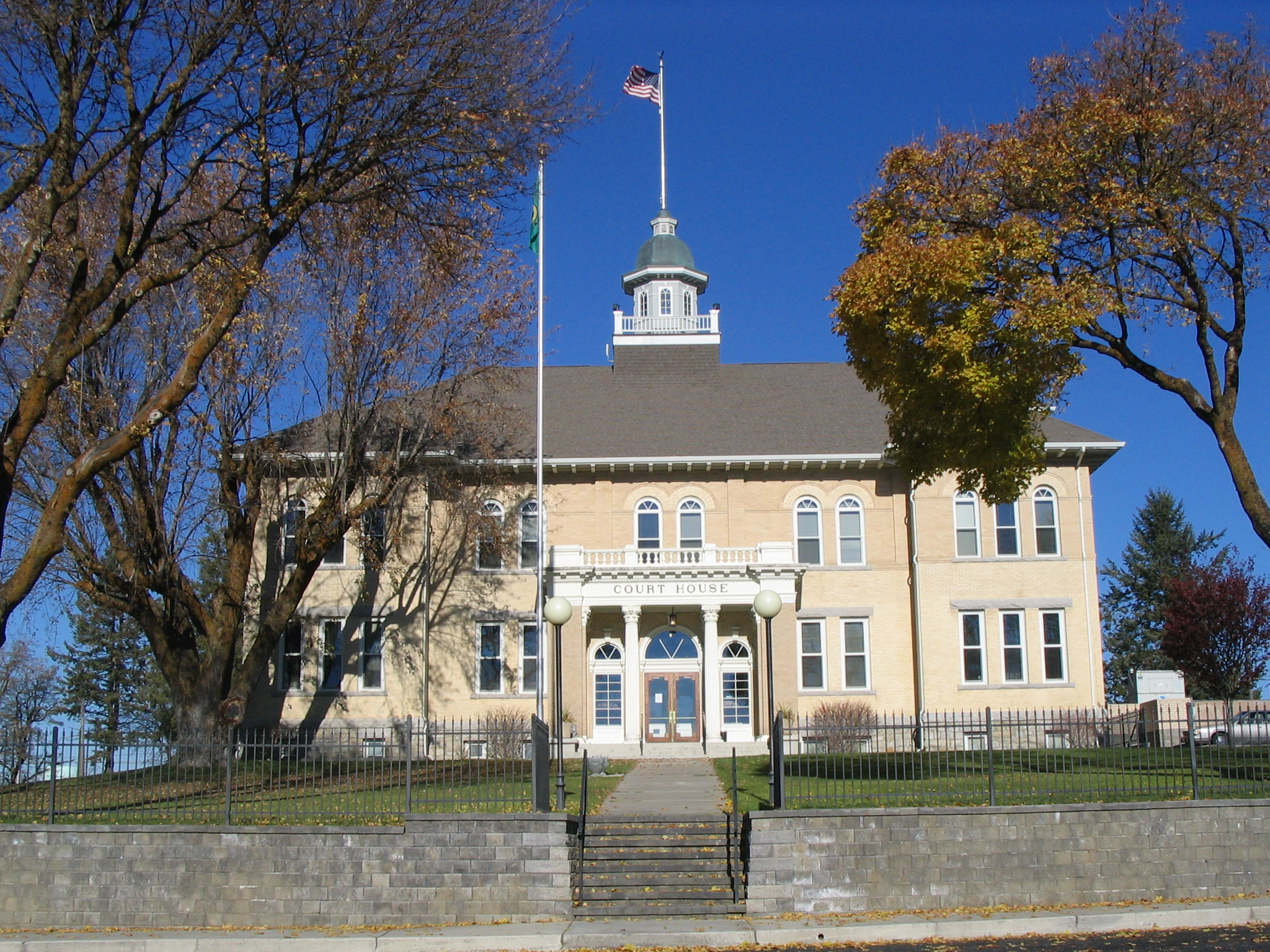
- Lincoln County Courthouse

- Location within the U.S. state of Washington
- Coordinates: 47°34′58″N 118°25′04″W
- Country: United States
- State: Washington
- Founded: November 24, 1883
- Named for: Abraham Lincoln
- Seat: Davenport
- Largest city: Davenport

Area
  - Total: 2,339 sq mi (6,060 km^{2})
  - Land: 2,310 sq mi (6,000 km^{2})
  - Water: 29 sq mi (75 km^{2}) 1.2%

Population (2020)
  - Total: 10,876
  - Estimate (2025): 11,982 ▲
  - Density: 4.71/sq mi (1.82/km^{2})
- Time zone: UTC−8 (Pacific)
  - Summer (DST): UTC−7 (PDT)
- Congressional district: 5th
- Website: www.lincolncountywa.com

Lincoln County is a county located in the U.S. state of Washington. As of the 2020 census, the population was 10,876, making it the fifth-least populous county in the state. The county seat and largest city is Davenport. Lincoln County was created from Whitman County in November 1883. It is named for Abraham Lincoln, the 16th president of the United States.

== History ==
In 1883, Lincoln County was created from a portion of Spokane County, and four days later a portion of its area was split to create Douglas County. There have been no further alterations to its boundary since that time. The name Sprague County was originally proposed, in honor of General John W. Sprague, until objections from legislators resulted in the name Lincoln County being used in the final bill. Its 2,317 square miles make it the eighth-largest by area in the state.

Centuries ago, the area now covered by Lincoln County contained an east–west passageway used by indigenous peoples. A spring near the present-day Davenport created a large overnight camping place.

The early exploration of the Northwest Territory by Lewis and Clark did not reach as far north as the Lincoln County expanses. The first recorded entry by European explorers was of David Thompson, a scout for the North West Company, who traversed the area in 1811. He noted physical locations in present-day Lincoln County. He described Hell Gate Rapid (calling it 'Strong Rapid'). That stretch of the Columbia River is now tame, because of the presence of Grand Coulee Dam. After this, there was considerable exploration by fur trappers and others, including famed Scottish botanist David Douglas in 1826.

Possibly the first permanent non-indigenous resident of the area was R.M. Bacon, originally from Boston, who began raising cattle around Crab Creek in 1871. When the first post office was established in the county, Bacon was its postmaster.

Emigration into the area accelerated in the late 1870s. Completion of the Northern Pacific Railway in 1883, and construction of Fort Spokane (1880-1882) hastened settlement.

== Geography and climate ==
Lincoln County lies on the Channeled Scablands, known as the Big Bend Plateau. It lies 1,500-2,500 feet above sea level, with a system of channels eroded into bedrock by glacial rivers and streams, flowing from northeastern Washington.

Lincoln County climate is hot/dry in the summer, cold/moderately humid in the winter. Due to the relatively level terrain (about 1,200 feet difference from lowest to highest elevations), temperatures tend to vary little from east to west. Precipitation varies from an arid condition in the western part of the county to semi-arid in the northeast. The entire area lies in the dry intermontane basin between the Cascades and the Rocky Mountain System. Precipitation (10-20 inches annual rainfall) is a major controlling factor in agriculture. Precipitation in the Big Bend region is highly variable; from 8 inches in the west to 20 inches in the northeast.

Monthly temperature averages range from below freezing in mid-winter to highs of 65-71 °F in mid-summer.

According to the United States Census Bureau, the county has a total area of 2,339 square miles (6,060 km^{2}), of which 2,310 square miles (6,000 km^{2}) is land and 29 square miles (75 km^{2}) (1.2%) is water.

=== Geographic features ===
- Channeled Scablands
- Columbia River
- Crab Creek
- Lilienthal Mountain, county high point

=== Major highways ===
- Interstate 90
- U.S. Route 2
- U.S. Route 395

=== Adjacent counties ===
- Okanogan County – northwest
- Ferry County – north
- Stevens County – northeast
- Spokane County – east
- Whitman County – southeast
- Adams County – south
- Grant County – west

=== National protected area ===
- Lake Roosevelt National Recreation Area (part)

== Demographics ==
Historical population
Census	Pop.	Note	%±
1890	9,312		—
1900	11,969		28.5%
1910	17,539		46.5%
1920	15,141		−13.7%
1930	11,876		−21.6%
1940	11,361		−4.3%
1950	10,970		−3.4%
1960	10,919		−0.5%
1970	9,572		−12.3%
1980	9,604		0.3%
1990	8,864		−7.7%
2000	10,184		14.9%
2010	10,570		3.8%
2020	10,876		2.9%
2025 (est.)	11,982	▲	10.2%
U.S. Decennial Census; 1790–1960 1900–1990; 1990–2000 2010–2020

=== 2020 census ===
As of the 2020 census, the county had a population of 10,876. Of the residents, 21.1% were under the age of 18 and 26.9% were 65 years of age or older; the median age was 48.4 years. For every 100 females there were 101.6 males, and for every 100 females age 18 and over there were 100.6 males. 0.0% of residents lived in urban areas and 100.0% lived in rural areas.

Lincoln County, Washington – Racial and ethnic composition Note: the US Census treats Hispanic/Latino as an ethnic category. This table excludes Latinos from the racial categories and assigns them to a separate category. Hispanics/Latinos may be of any race.
Race / Ethnicity (NH = Non-Hispanic)	Pop 2000	Pop 2010	Pop 2020	% 2000	% 2010	% 2020
White alone (NH)	9,632	9,891	9,576	94.58%	93.58%	88.05%
Black or African American alone (NH)	22	25	15	0.22%	0.24%	0.14%
Native American or Alaska Native alone (NH)	152	162	204	1.49%	1.53%	1.88%
Asian alone (NH)	24	41	67	0.24%	0.39%	0.62%
Pacific Islander alone (NH)	7	5	14	0.07%	0.05%	0.13%
Other race alone (NH)	8	5	57	0.08%	0.05%	0.52%
Mixed race or Multiracial (NH)	148	202	558	1.45%	1.91%	5.13%
Hispanic or Latino (any race)	191	239	385	1.88%	2.26%	3.54%
Total	10,184	10,570	10,876	100.00%	100.00%	100.00%

The racial makeup of the county was 89.2% White, 0.2% Black or African American, 2.1% American Indian and Alaska Native, 0.7% Asian, 1.2% from some other race, and 6.5% from two or more races. Hispanic or Latino residents of any race comprised 3.5% of the population.

There were 4,528 households in the county, of which 25.6% had children under the age of 18 living with them and 20.4% had a female householder with no spouse or partner present. About 27.6% of all households were made up of individuals and 14.8% had someone living alone who was 65 years of age or older.

There were 5,732 housing units, of which 21.0% were vacant. Among occupied housing units, 79.7% were owner-occupied and 20.3% were renter-occupied. The homeowner vacancy rate was 2.2% and the rental vacancy rate was 8.3%.

=== 2010 census ===
As of the 2010 census, there were 10,570 people, 4,422 households, and 3,059 families residing in the county. The population density was 4.6 people per square mile (1.8 people/km^{2}). There were 5,776 housing units at an average density of 2.5 units per square mile (0.97 units/km^{2}). The racial makeup of the county was 95.0% white, 1.6% American Indian, 0.4% Asian, 0.3% black or African American, 0.5% from other races, and 2.2% from two or more races. Those of Hispanic or Latino origin made up 2.3% of the population. In terms of ancestry, 42.3% were German, 14.6% were Irish, 13.9% were English, 5.5% were Norwegian, 5.3% were Scotch-Irish, and 3.6% were American.

Of the 4,422 households, 25.9% had children under the age of 18 living with them, 57.3% were married couples living together, 7.7% had a female householder with no husband present, 30.8% were non-families, and 27.1% of all households were made up of individuals. The average household size was 2.37 and the average family size was 2.85. The median age was 47.6 years.

The median income for a household in the county was $45,582 and the median income for a family was $52,083. Males had a median income of $44,491 versus $30,617 for females. The per capita income for the county was $24,757. About 7.1% of families and 12.1% of the population were below the poverty line, including 21.5% of those under age 18 and 6.0% of those age 65 or over.

=== 2000 census ===
As of the 2000 census, there were 10,184 people, 4,151 households, and 2,914 families in the county. The population density was 4 people per square mile (1.5 people/km^{2}). There were 5,298 housing units at an average density of 2 units per square mile (0.77 units/km^{2}). The racial makeup of the county was 95.64% White, 0.23% Black or African American, 1.63% Native American, 0.25% Asian, 0.07% Pacific Islander, 0.58% from other races, and 1.61% from two or more races. 1.88% of the population were Hispanic or Latino of any race. 36.6% were of German, 10.5% English, 9.3% United States or American and 5.8% Irish ancestry.

There were 4,151 households, out of which 29.30% had children under the age of 18 living with them, 60.90% were married couples living together, 6.40% had a female householder with no husband present, and 29.80% were non-families. 26.00% of all households were made up of individuals, and 12.30% had someone living alone who was 65 years of age or older. The average household size was 2.42 and the average family size was 2.91.

In the county, the population was spread out, with 25.30% under the age of 18, 5.20% from 18 to 24, 23.20% from 25 to 44, 27.40% from 45 to 64, and 19.00% who were 65 years of age or older. The median age was 43 years. For every 100 females there were 98.40 males. For every 100 females age 18 and over, there were 94.70 males.

The median income for a household in the county was $35,255, and the median income for a family was $41,269. Males had a median income of $31,086 versus $22,444 for females. The per capita income for the county was $17,888. About 8.40% of families and 12.60% of the population were below the poverty line, including 17.60% of those under age 18 and 7.70% of those age 65 or over.

== Government and politics ==
The county is administered by a three-member Board of Commissioners.

Like neighboring Adams County, Lincoln County is one of the most conservative counties in Washington. The last Democratic presidential candidate to carry the county was Harry Truman in 1948. In 1964, it was one of only three counties in the state to be carried by Barry Goldwater, and was the nation's northernmost county or equivalent to vote for Goldwater. In the last nine presidential elections, no Democratic candidate has received more than 36 percent of the county's vote; the last Democratic gubernatorial nominee it backed was Booth Gardner in 1988, during a major drought and farm crisis. In 2016, Donald Trump won over 70 percent of the county's vote, making it his strongest county in the state. In 2024, the county was one of only two in Washington State, along with neighboring Stevens County, to give all ten statewide Republican candidates over 70% of the vote.

United States presidential election results for Lincoln County, Washington
Year	Republican		Democratic		Third party(ies)	
Year	No.	%	No.	%	No.	%
1892	915	39.19%	831	35.59%	589	25.22%
1896	781	30.18%	1,771	68.43%	36	1.39%
1900	1,414	45.58%	1,585	51.10%	103	3.32%
1904	2,472	67.41%	1,004	27.38%	191	5.21%
1908	2,025	55.19%	1,443	39.33%	201	5.48%
1912	691	14.46%	1,829	38.26%	2,260	47.28%
1916	2,356	43.06%	2,827	51.67%	288	5.26%
1920	3,038	65.04%	1,395	29.87%	238	5.10%
1924	2,042	46.16%	743	16.79%	1,639	37.05%
1928	2,718	59.62%	1,807	39.64%	34	0.75%
1932	1,748	38.04%	2,725	59.30%	122	2.66%
1936	1,325	26.14%	3,627	71.55%	117	2.31%
1940	2,627	47.32%	2,896	52.16%	29	0.52%
1944	2,723	53.75%	2,328	45.95%	15	0.30%
1948	2,348	47.68%	2,518	51.14%	58	1.18%
1952	3,422	63.31%	1,974	36.52%	9	0.17%
1956	3,114	57.77%	2,273	42.17%	3	0.06%
1960	3,211	58.77%	2,248	41.14%	5	0.09%
1964	2,911	55.84%	2,299	44.10%	3	0.06%
1968	2,994	59.25%	1,721	34.06%	338	6.69%
1972	3,647	69.14%	1,453	27.55%	175	3.32%
1976	2,925	57.57%	1,978	38.93%	178	3.50%
1980	3,324	62.28%	1,597	29.92%	416	7.79%
1984	3,474	66.90%	1,671	32.18%	48	0.92%
1988	2,689	57.89%	1,884	40.56%	72	1.55%
1992	2,152	43.59%	1,653	33.48%	1,132	22.93%
1996	2,587	51.40%	1,806	35.88%	640	12.72%
2000	3,546	68.23%	1,417	27.27%	234	4.50%
2004	4,015	69.09%	1,706	29.36%	90	1.55%
2008	3,803	63.63%	2,032	34.00%	142	2.38%
2012	4,063	69.19%	1,673	28.49%	136	2.32%
2016	4,108	70.09%	1,244	21.23%	509	8.68%
2020	5,150	73.23%	1,713	24.36%	170	2.42%
2024	5,272	73.80%	1,678	23.49%	194	2.72%

== Economy ==
The county is dependent on agriculture, primarily wheat farming. Lincoln County is generally considered the second-largest producer of wheat in the United States (following Whitman County, Washington), sometimes producing 25 million bushels (680,000 t) per year. Only about 500,000 of 900,000 acres (2,000 of 3,600 km^{2} (1,390 sq mi)) of farmland in the county are planted in any given year due to the practice of typically harvesting one crop every two years ("summer-fallow"), a necessity in a region with only 12 inches (300 mm) of precipitation annually.

Livestock husbandry is also a significant county activity, although to a significantly lower degree. For example, in 1954 the county was #3 in the state for crop income, but was only #21 in the state for income from livestock and livestock products.

== Communities ==
=== Cities ===
- Davenport (county seat)
- Harrington
- Sprague

=== Towns ===
- Almira
- Creston
- Odessa
- Reardan
- Wilbur

=== Unincorporated communities ===
- Clark
- Edwall
- Irby
- Lamona
- Lincoln
- Mondovi
- Mohler
- Seven Bays

=== Ghost towns ===
- Fishtrap
- Govan
- Sherman
- Telford

== See also ==
- National Register of Historic Places listings in Lincoln County, Washington
