= Jamie Margolin =

American climate change activist

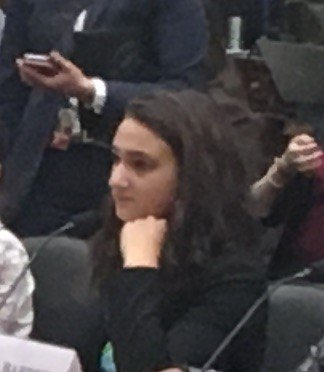
- Jamie Margolin in 2019
- Education: New York University Tisch School of the Arts
- Occupation: Climate justice activist
- Known for: Organizing the Youth Climate Action March

Jamie Margolin is a Colombian-American climate justice activist. She is a co-founder of Zero Hour (USA), a climate-focused youth organization that is part of Future Coalition.

== Education ==
Margolin attended Holy Names Academy. She studied film at the New York University Tisch School of the Arts.

== Activism ==
In 2017, at age 15, Margolin founded the youth climate action organization Zero Hour with Nadia Nazar, Zanagee Artis, and other youth activists. Margolin co-founded Zero Hour in reaction to the response she saw after Hurricane Maria in Puerto Rico and her personal experience during the 2017 Washington wildfires.

In September 2018, Margolin was part of a youth group that sued Governor Jay Inslee and the State of Washington over greenhouse-gas emissions in the state. The case was dismissed by a King County Superior Court judge, who ruled the case to be political one that must be resolved by the Governor and the legislature. It has since been appealed Washington Court of Appeals. Margolin is also a plaintiff in the case of Aji P. v. Washington which is suing the state of Washington for their inaction against climate change on the basis of a stable climate being a human right.

In September 2019, she was asked to testify on a panel called "Voices Leading the Next Generation on the Global Climate Crisis" alongside Greta Thunberg for the United States House of Representatives.

In 2020, Margolin published her first book, Youth to Power: Your Voice and How to Use It. In 2021, she started a Climate Justice Scholarship with the goal of allowing "budding activists such as herself to start tackling the climate crisis".

== Personal life ==
Margolin identifies as Jewish, Latinx, and as a lesbian.

== Awards and honors ==
In 2018, Margolin was part of Teen Vogue's 21 Under 21. She was also named as one of People Magazine's 25 Women Changing the World for 2018.

Margolin was recognized as one of the BBC's 100 women of 2019. In the same year, she also won an MTV Europe Music Awards Generation Change award.

In 2020, Margolin was a keynote speaker at Verdical Group's annual Net Zero Conference.

== Bibliography ==
- Youth to Power: Your Voice and How to Use It (Hachette Books, 2020)
