= 2017 Washington wildfires =

Wildfire season in Washington, United States

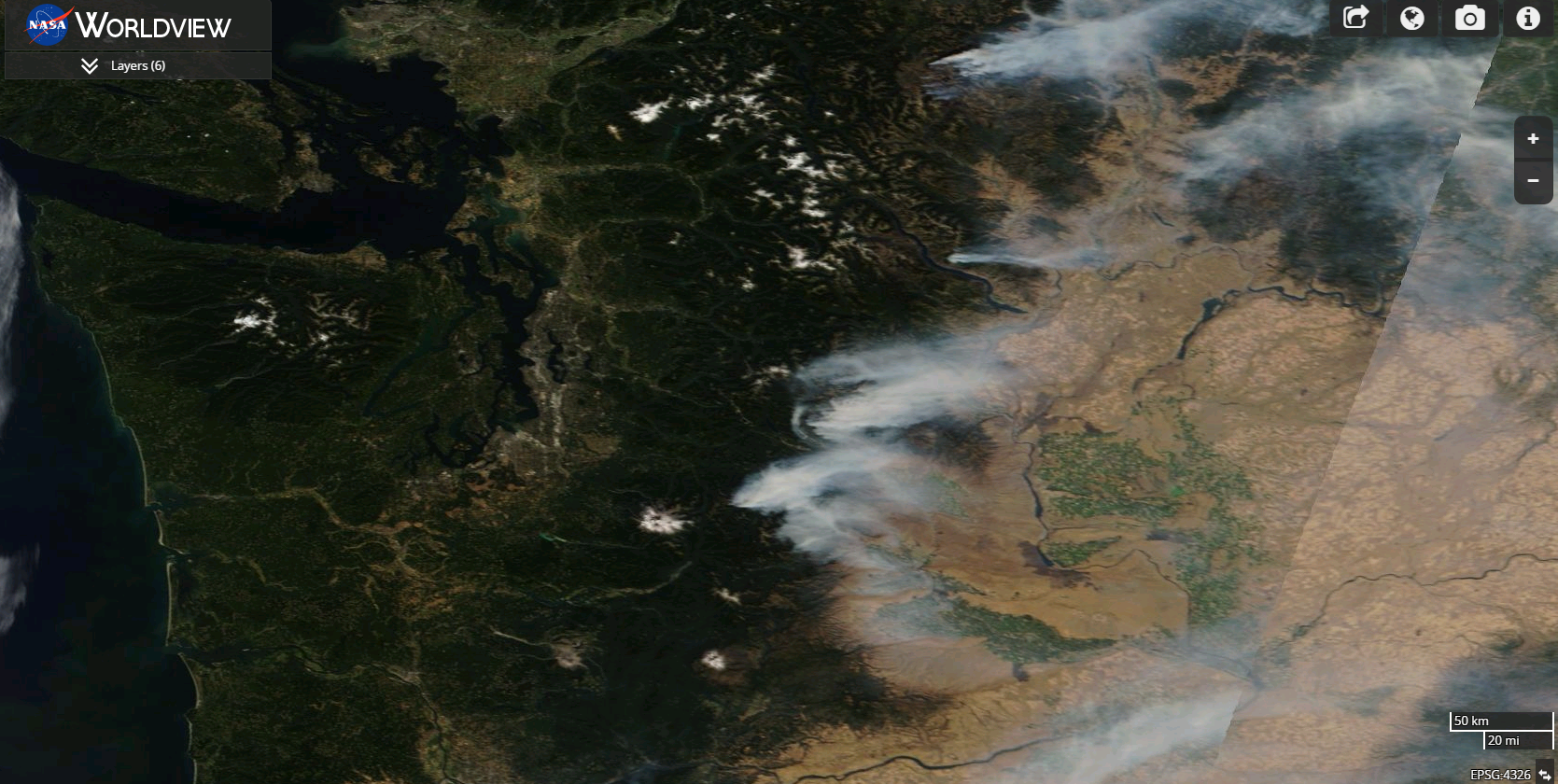
- Wildfires burning September 3, 2017 (satellite image). Visible in the Cascades, north to south: Diamond Creek Fire, Jolly Mountain Fire, Norse Peak Fire
- Date: May–October 2017 Statewide state of emergency: September 2, 2017

The 2017 Washington wildfires were a series of wildfires that burned over the course of 2017, a year that set weather records for heat and aridity in both Western Washington and Eastern Washington.

== Background ==
While the typical "fire season" in Washington varies every year based on weather conditions, most wildfires occur in between July and October. However, hotter, drier conditions can allow wildfires to start outside of these boundaries. Wildfires tend to start at these times of the year after moisture from winter and spring precipitation dries up. Vegetation and overall conditions are the hottest and driest in these periods. The increase of vegetation can make the fires spread easier.

== Timeline of events ==
Fire season officially began on April 15. Training of state fire crews was conducted in May, as well as training of Washington National Guard in helitack insertion for fire crews.

On the morning of August 1, smoke from BC fires pushed into the Seattle area, rapidly making Mount Rainier invisible on a cloudless day. In early August, heavy smoke from British Columbia over Seattle earned the social media title "Smokezilla". Mid-month, several large fires in the state's Cascades Range were ignited by lightning.

On August 8, the city of Seattle recorded 52 straight days without rain, a new record. The first measurable rainfall at Seattle-Tacoma International Airport (Sea-Tac) was 0.02 inches in mid-August, setting a record 55 day dry streak.

On September 2, the Governor of Washington, Jay Inslee, declared a state of emergency across all Washington counties due to wildfires.

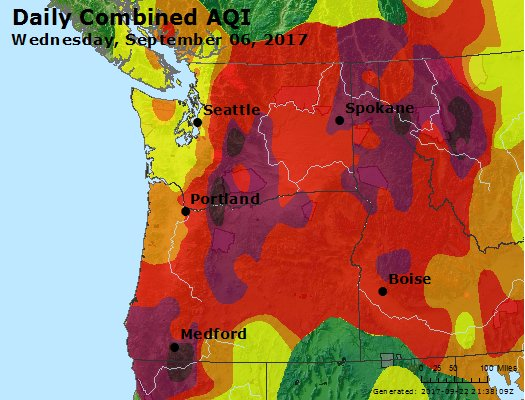
Peak Air Quality Index values for Oregon and Washington on September 6, 2017. Air quality is hazardous in parts of Washington and Oregon, "very unhealthy" in Spokane, and at least "unhealthy" across most of the area.

On September 5, ash from the Central Washington fires fell "like snow" on Seattle and as far west as Grays Harbor County which borders the Pacific Ocean. University of Washington meteorology professor Cliff Mass said the situation in Seattle with "a smoke cloud so dense one would think it is low stratus deck" was unprecedented in his 30 years of experience. The Air Quality Index reached "hazardous" in Spokane, the worst of six levels; it had reached hazardous the day before in Newport, Washington, the worst in the country.

On September 5, Cle Elum-Roslyn School District announced the start of the school year would be postponed, and on the 6th, all classes and events in Ellensburg School District were canceled until September 11, due to unhealthy indoor air quality.

The first significant rain wasn't until after mid September. By the end of the summer, the official weather station at Sea-Tac, representing Western Washington's conditions, had recorded the hottest, driest summer since recordkeeping began with just over 0.5 inches (13 mm) of rain. Eastern Washington also had a very dry year with Spokane setting a new record of 80 days without measurable rain. A climate scientist at University of Idaho said that the extremes caused greater fire activity and were due to climate change, but not necessarily linked to human causes.

== List of fires ==
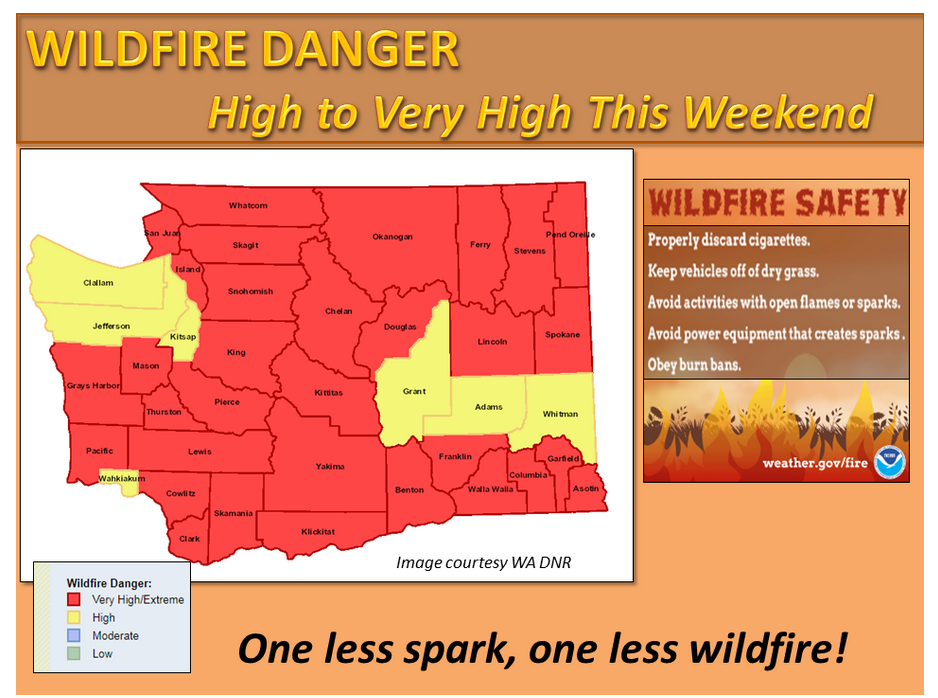
Wildfire warning published online by National Weather Service for Washington State over Labor Day weekend 2017

- Leavenworth Fire, May
- Spartan Fire, June
- Sutherland Canyon and Straight Hollow fires, near Quincy, June
- Diamond Creek Fire in Pasayten Wilderness, started late July and spread to Canada near Manning Provincial Park on August 31
- Noisy Creek Fire, in Colville National Forest, began July 15
- Monument Hill Fire caused partial evacuation of Quincy in August
- "Smokezilla": smoke from 2017 British Columbia wildfires affected Seattle in August
- Norse Peak Fire began in August, caused closure of Chinook Pass highway
- Jolly Mountain Fire began on August 11, evacuations began August 31
- On September 5, the Eagle Creek Fire jumped the Columbia Gorge from Oregon into Skamania County.

== Resources ==
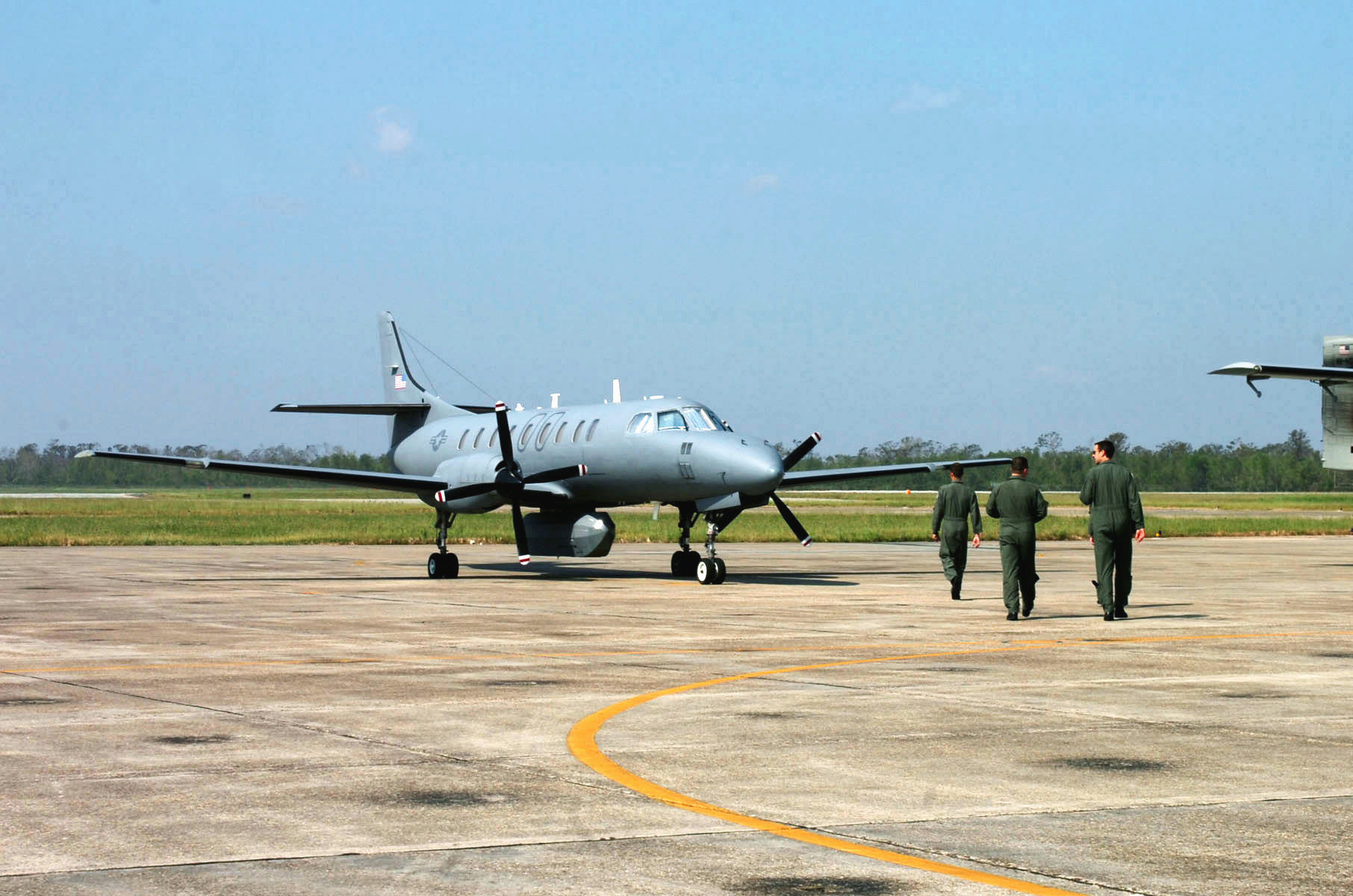
An RC-26 like this one was deployed to Spokane. Aircraft used for 2005 New Orleans floods pictured.

An infrared thermography-capable RC-26 surveillance aircraft and support crew from Washington Air National Guard were deployed to Fairchild Air Force Base in Spokane on August 12 in support of firefighting.

On August 29, the Washington Military Department's Emergency Operation Center at Camp Murray was activated in response to the Jolly Mountain Fire.

On September 5, the U.S. Army said 200 Washington-based soldiers were to be trained and sent to the Umpqua North Complex fires in Oregon's Umpqua National Forest.

== See also ==
- List of Washington wildfires
