= Jolly Mountain Fire =

Wildfire in the United States

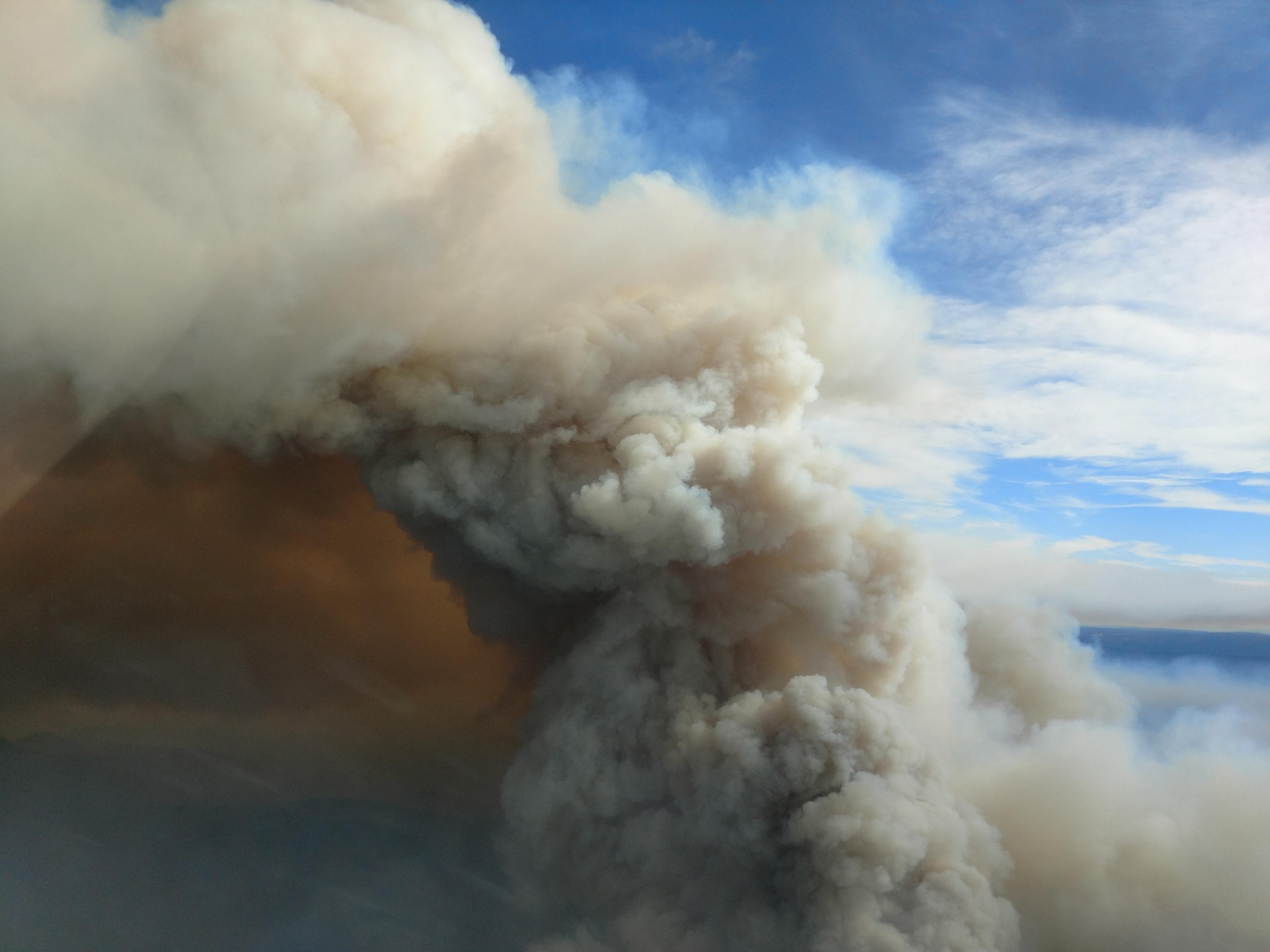
- Fire as seen from government firefighting aircraft on August 30, 2017
- Date: Ignited: August 11, 2017 State of Emergency: August 29 Evacuations: August 31, 2017 EOC activation: September 2, 2017 100% contained: November 2, 2017
- Location: Wenatchee National Forest; Kittitas County, Washington
- Coordinates: 47.34°N 121.04°W

Statistics
- Burned area: 36,808 acres (14,896 ha) as of November 2, 2017
- Land use: Forest and residential

Impacts
- Cost: Unknown

Ignition
- Cause: Lightning

Map
- Location of fire in Washington

The Jolly Mountain fire was a wildfire in Wenatchee National Forest, Kittitas County, Washington, that began with lightning strikes August 11, 2017 and burned for over three months. Fires burned in the upper reaches of the Teanaway River a few miles east of Cle Elum Lake.

== History ==
By August 18, the fire was over 500 acres and the state's Teanaway Community Forest was closed in response.

On August 24, the fire stood at over 1,700 acres and public meetings were held to discuss area closures and possible future evacuations. By August 28, the fire was over 5,000 acres, and smoke was noticeable in the Seattle metropolitan area about 100 kilometers away.

On August 29, Kittitas County declared a state of emergency, and pyrocumulus clouds were visible on satellite images of the Cascades. On the same day, the Washington Military Department's Emergency Operation Center at Camp Murray was activated in response to Jolly Mountain. Smoke continued to affect visibility and air quality in Seattle on August 30, and air quality in Kittitas County was officially termed "unhealthy". The fire grew rapidly August 30–31 due to winds.

By August 31, the fire stood at over 9,000 acres and was zero percent contained; local government near the city of Cle Elum began ordering evacuations of over 150 homes. On September 2, at over 14,500 acres, the fire was deemed to be too big for local response and authority was transferred to the Washington State Patrol's Fire Protection Bureau. Due to the Jolly Mountain event and the slightly larger Norse Peak fire, air quality in Wenatchee and Yakima was "very unhealthy" and outdoor sports events canceled.

On September 4, the fire stood at just under 21,000 acres, the city of Ellensburg declared a state of emergency, Cle Elum's air quality was deemed "dangerous" by the county, and contingency plans to evacuate Cle Elum by turning State Route 10 into a one-way avenue were discussed. On September 5, skies were darkened and ash fell on Seattle "like snow".

By September 20, the beginnings of the rainy fall season began to abate the fires and a few days went by with zero new acres burned and greatly improved air quality except in the immediate Cle Elum area.

On September 29, with the fire 50% contained, all evacuation orders were canceled.

By November 2, the fire was 100% contained but still burning.

== Environmental impact ==
The fire affected an endangered species, the northern spotted owl.

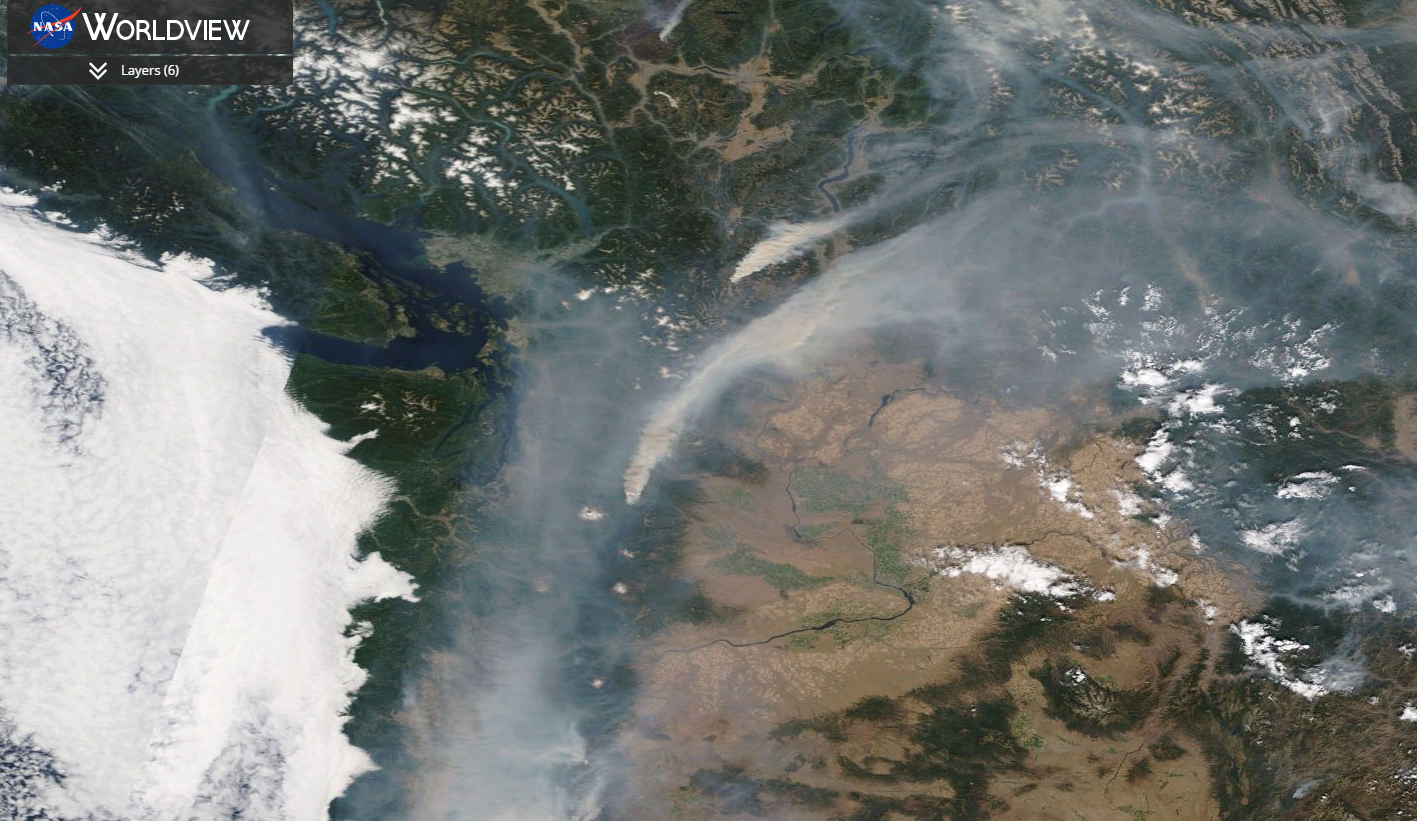
Satellite image of Washington showing active fires in the Cascade Mountains

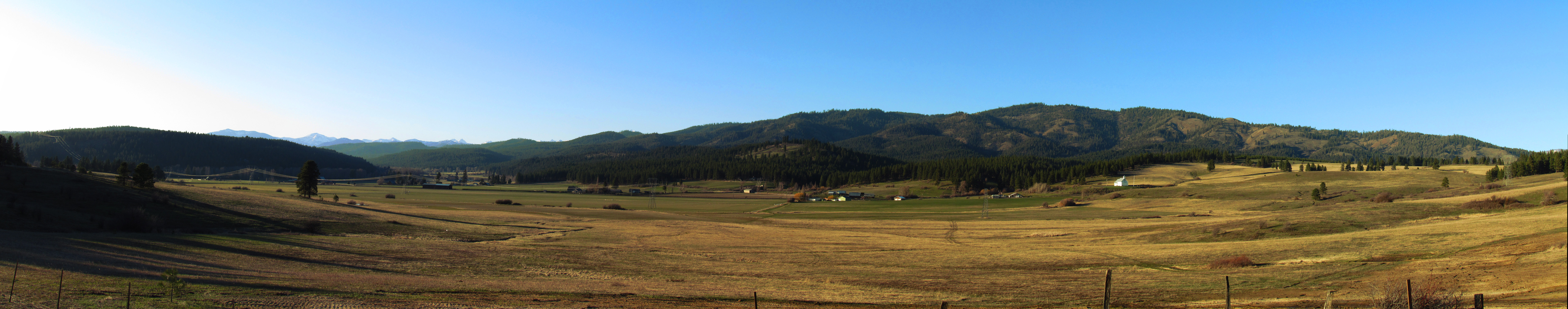
Ground-level panorama of normal conditions

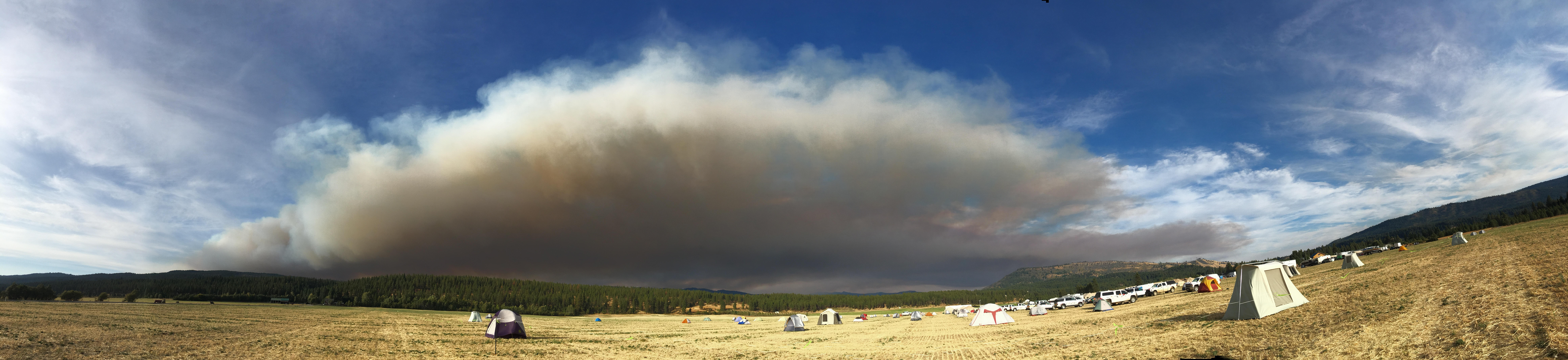
Ground-level panorama of fire

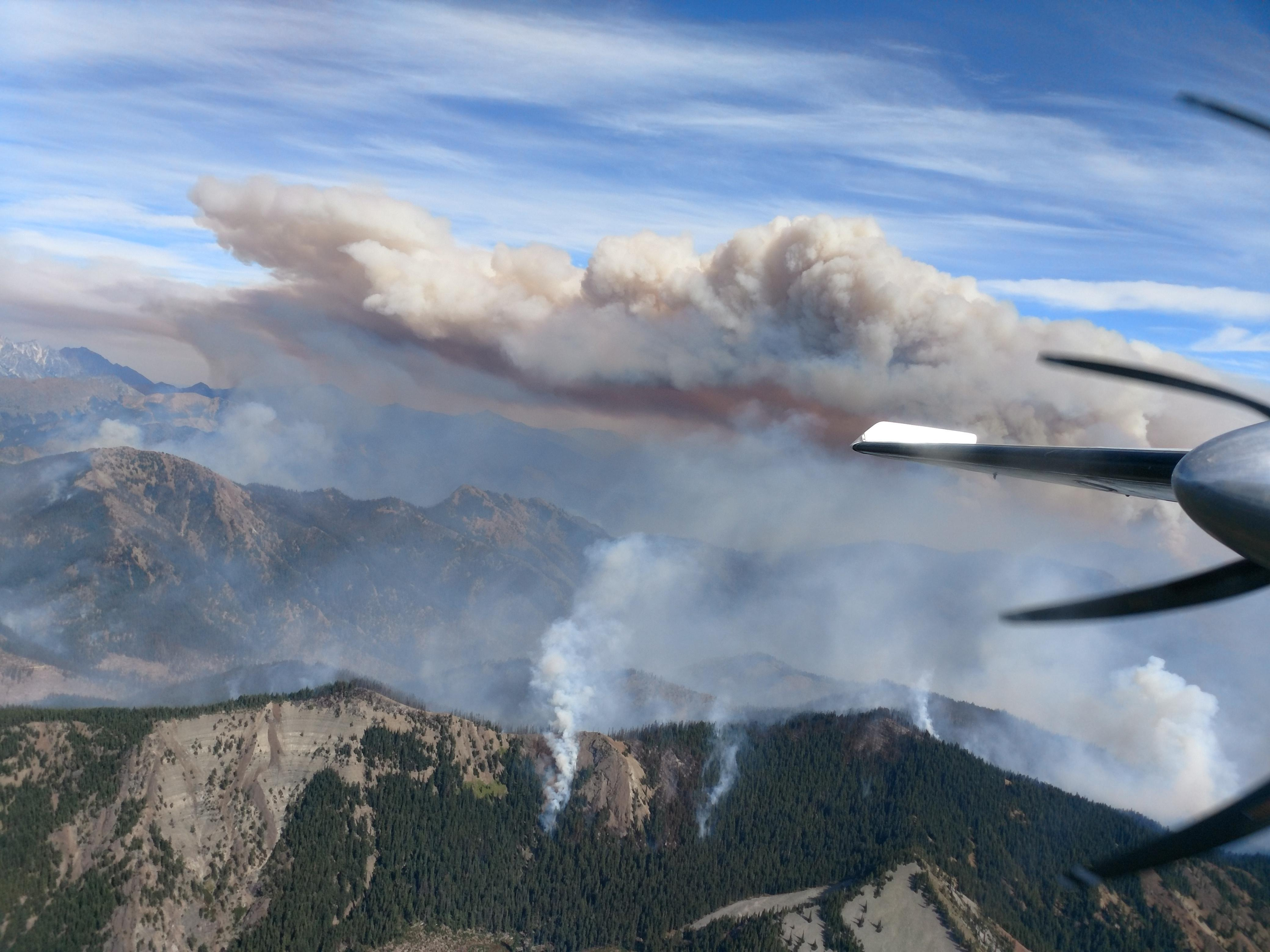
From government firefighting aircraft on August 30

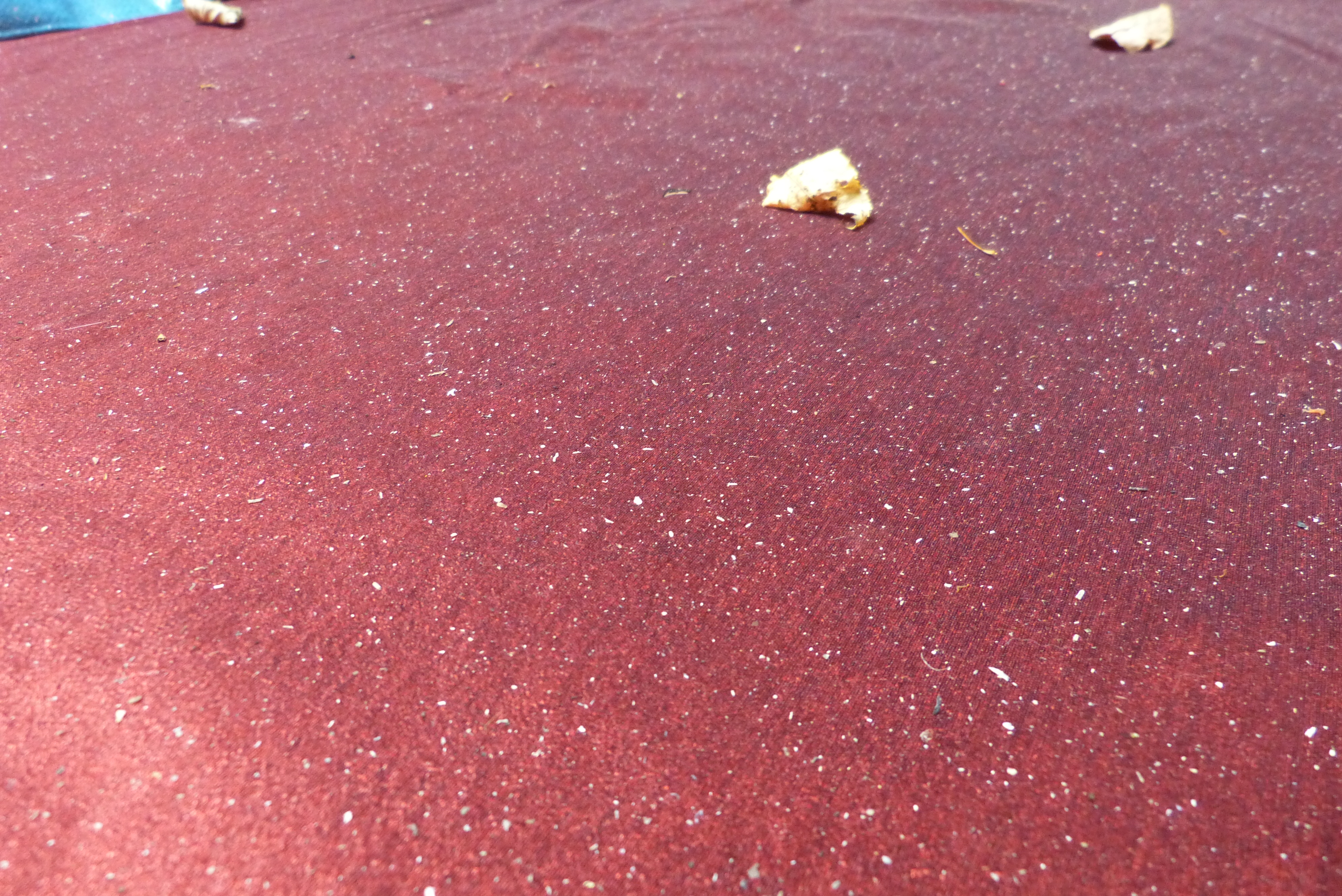
Ash on an outdoor table near Seattle, September 5
