= Zanagee Artis =

American activist

- Born: 1999 (age 26–27); Clinton, Connecticut
- Education: Brown University
- Occupation: Climate activist
- Years active: 2017-current
- Known for: Co-founder of Zero Hour

Zanagee Artis (born 1999) is an American climate activist. He is best known for co-founding the youth-led climate activist group Zero Hour in 2017. As of 2021, Artis was Acting Policy Director of Zero Hour.

== Biography ==
In high school, he started his high school's Sustainability Committee, which evolved into its Green Team. In the summer between his high school junior and senior years in 2017, he attended a summer program at Princeton University. Artis states he began to start thinking beyond his local community after talking with fellow program participants Jamie Margolin and Madelaine Tew. They and other youth activists formed Zero Hour. Zero Hour names colonialism, capitalism, racism, and patriarchy as the core causes of the climate crisis.

Zero Hour organized the a Youth Climate March in July 2018 in Washington, D.C., with satellite marches held worldwide. Artis, as logistics director, planned the main event and coordinated with the United States Capitol Police. Artis states, "That was a real launching point for our movement, and it also inspired young people around the world. Greta Thunberg's Fridays for Future was actually inspired by the Youth Climate March."

Subsequently, Artis worked with the Sunrise Movement on the September and November 2019 climate strikes.

In September 2020, he stated that Zero Hour has shifted its focus to education. During the 2020 United States presidential election, as policy director, Artis led the #Vote4OurFuture campaign. The campaign focused on swing states like Michigan and Pennsylvania, with the goal of increasing voter turnout in support of the Green New Deal. Artis stated, "We want climate change to be a top priority on people’s minds when they’re going to the polls in November because of the way it will impact people of color and people living in those cities." Also in 2020, Artis was a keynote speaker at Verdical Group's annual Net Zero Conference.

In 2021, Artis published his first book, A Kids Book About Climate, with co-author, Olivia Greenspan, another environmental activist. Both felt that there weren't any resources to understand climate change and its implications in a way that wasn't overwhelming and created this book for both children and adults.

In 2022, Artis worked briefly at Goldman Sachs in their financial crimes division, but left in 2023 to spend more time working at Zero Hour. He is also currently a Fossil Fuels Policy Advocate for Natural Resources Defense Council (NRDC).

== Personal ==
Artis grew up in Clinton, Connecticut and credits his childhood spent in Hammonasset Beach State Park with inspiring his interest in environmentalism. Artis entered Brown University in 2018 and earned a bachelor's degree in political science and environmental studies. At Brown, he served as the Secretary of the Black Pre Law Association, the Chair of Campus Life for the Undergraduate Council of Students, and the Vice President of Zeta Delta Xi.
