= Diamond Creek fire =

2017 wildfire in Washington, United States

Diamond Creek Fire
- Part of the 2017 Washington wildfires
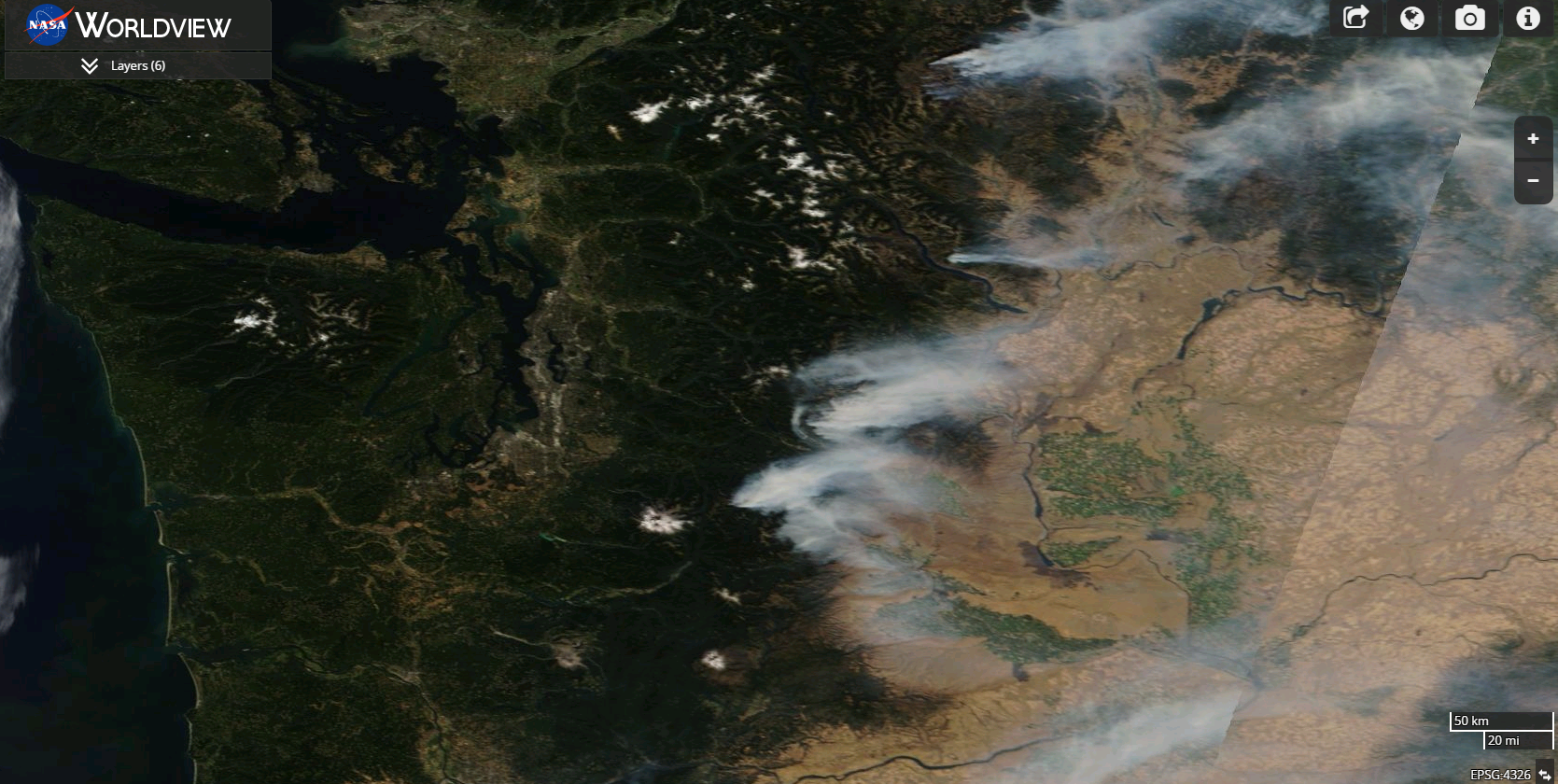
- Diamond Creek Fire smoke plume is the northernmost visible in this September 3 satellite image
- Date: July 23, 2017; 8 years ago
- Location: Pasayten Wilderness; Okanogan County, Washington
- Coordinates: 48.855°N 120.413°W

Statistics
- Burned area: 128,272 acres (51,910 ha)
- Land use: Forest

Impacts
- Cost: Unknown

Ignition
- Cause: Human activity

Map
- Location of fire in Washington

The Diamond Creek Fire was a wildfire in the Pasayten Wilderness, Okanogan County, Washington, that began with an improperly extinguished campfire on July 23, 2017. In July, the fire threatened historic cabins with destruction. On August 31, it spread to Canada in an area between Cathedral Provincial Park and Manning Provincial Park. On September 6, it grew beyond 100,000 acres to become a megafire. The fire was contained on October 23, 2017.
