= Teanaway Community Forest =

Community forest and recreation area in the U.S. state of Washington

- Location within Washington (state)
- Nearest city: Cle Elum, Washington
- Coordinates: 47°15′25″N 120°53′31″W
- Area: 50,272 acres (203.44 km^{2})
- Created: September 2013
- Administrator: Washington State Department of Natural Resources
- Website: www.dnr.wa.gov/Teanaway

Teanaway Community Forest is a state owned 50,272-acre (20,344 ha) dual-use community forest and recreation area in the central Washington Cascades near Cle Elum. It was created through a public-private partnership involving Forterra and both Washington Department of Fish and Wildlife and Washington Department of Natural Resources acting towards the Yakima Basin Integrated Plan. When the land purchase from a private timber company was made in September 2013, it was described as the single largest transaction in Washington state in the past 45 years. The forest is about the size of the city of Seattle, 65 miles (105 km) to the west.

DNR managers have requested the state legislature to pay for state-owned land physically within the community forest's boundaries to be administratively transferred into the community forest. Unless it is transferred, the trust lands must be logged to raise funds for Washington schools.

== Recreation ==
The Forest contains a total of 127 established campsites with fire rings. The 29 Pines Campground has 59 sites, the Teanaway Camping Area has 55 sites, and the Indian Camp has 13 sites, with 2 specifically for group use. The forest contains several privately held inholdings, so visitors are encouraged to reference area maps to avoid trespassing.

Dispersed camping, camping outside of designated campgrounds and firewood harvesting is currently disallowed, but the Teanaway Community Forest Recreation Plan includes provisions to eventually support these purposes. This plan is designed to establish sustainable management approaches for the Teanaway until 2033.
