= 1968 United States presidential election in Washington (state) =

- November 5, 1968

Nominee	Hubert Humphrey	Richard Nixon	George Wallace
Party	Democratic	Republican	American Independent
Home state	Minnesota	New York (Note: Although he was born in California and he served as a U.S. senator from California, in 1968 Richard Nixon's official state of residence was New York, because he moved there to practice law after his defeat in the 1962 California gubernatorial election. During his first term as president, Nixon re-established his residency in California. Consequently, most reliable reference books list Nixon's home state as New York in the 1968 election and his home state as California in the 1972 (and 1960) election.)	Alabama
Running mate	Edmund Muskie	Spiro Agnew	Marvin Griffin
Electoral vote	9	0	0
Popular vote	616,037	588,510	96,990
Percentage	47.23%	45.12%	7.44%

Humphrey
40–50%
50–60%
Nixon
40–50%
50–60%
60–70%
President before election
Lyndon B. Johnson
Democratic
Elected President
Richard Nixon
Republican

The 1968 United States presidential election in Washington took place on November 5, 1968, as part of the 1968 United States presidential election. State voters chose nine representatives, or electors, to the Electoral College, who voted for president and vice president.

Washington was won by the Democratic candidate, Vice President Hubert Humphrey, with 47.23 percent of the popular vote, against the Republican candidate, former Senator and Vice President Richard Nixon, with 45.12 percent of the popular vote. American candidate George Wallace also appeared on the ballot, finishing with 7.44 percent of the popular vote.

Nixon became the first Republican to win the presidency without carrying Washington state since William McKinley in 1896. Despite Nixon losing the statewide election, he became the first Republican to carry Ferry County since Warren G. Harding did so in 1920. Along with Maine, Washington was one of only two states that Nixon lost in 1968 that he won in his unsuccessful attempt at the presidency in 1960.

George Wallace was most successful in Eastern Washington, a region settled by Upland Southerners, Okies, and Border State residents. This region has a tradition of hostility to Washington D.C. interference, and to Northeastern big business. Wallace possessed little appeal in heavily Yankee and Scandinavian-settled Western Washington.

This election would prove the last time the Democrats won any mainland postbellum state until Michael Dukakis carried Washington and Oregon in 1988 – in the intervening period many pundits spoke of a "Solid Republican West". As of 2024, this is the fifth and final election in which Washington voted for a different candidate than neighboring Oregon.

== Campaign ==
=== Forecasts ===
This table lists election forecasts for Washington state in the 1968 presidential election.

Source	Ranking	As of
St. Petersburg Times	Lean R	September 11, 1968

== Results ==
1968 United States presidential election in Washington
Party	Candidate	Votes	%
Democratic	Hubert Humphrey	616,037	47.23%
Republican	Richard Nixon	588,510	45.12%
American Independent	George Wallace	96,990	7.44%
Peace and Freedom	Eldridge Cleaver	1,609	0.12%
Socialist Labor	Henning Blomen	488	0.04%
Free Ballot	Charlene Mitchell	377	0.03%
Socialist Workers	Fred Halstead	270	0.02%
Total votes		1,304,281	100%

=== Results by county ===
County	Hubert Humphrey Democratic		Richard Nixon Republican		George Wallace American Independent		Other candidates Various parties		Margin		Total votes cast
County	#	%	#	%	#	%	#	%	#	%	Total votes cast
Adams	1,270	30.67%	2,572	62.11%	299	7.22%	0	0.00%	-1,302	-31.44%	4,141
Asotin	2,693	49.56%	2,307	42.45%	433	7.97%	1	0.02%	386	7.11%	5,434
Benton	10,878	38.06%	14,659	51.29%	3,024	10.58%	18	0.06%	-3,781	-13.23%	28,579
Chelan	6,787	39.39%	9,093	52.77%	1,324	7.68%	26	0.15%	-2,306	-13.38%	17,230
Clallam	7,030	49.39%	5,921	41.60%	1,248	8.77%	35	0.25%	1,109	7.79%	14,234
Clark	23,046	51.82%	18,858	42.40%	2,514	5.65%	56	0.13%	4,188	9.42%	44,474
Columbia	754	35.04%	1,221	56.74%	175	8.13%	2	0.09%	-467	-21.70%	2,152
Cowlitz	13,363	51.90%	10,842	42.10%	1,507	5.85%	38	0.15%	2,521	9.80%	25,750
Douglas	2,764	41.47%	3,234	48.52%	663	9.95%	4	0.06%	-470	-7.05%	6,665
Ferry	596	42.97%	608	43.84%	182	13.12%	1	0.07%	-12	-0.87%	1,387
Franklin	4,038	42.17%	4,234	44.22%	1,299	13.57%	4	0.04%	-196	-2.05%	9,575
Garfield	602	37.96%	841	53.03%	143	9.02%	0	0.00%	-239	-15.07%	1,586
Grant	5,773	40.18%	7,007	48.77%	1,574	10.96%	13	0.09%	-1,234	-8.59%	14,367
Grays Harbor	13,480	59.43%	7,720	34.03%	1,426	6.29%	58	0.26%	5,760	25.40%	22,684
Island	3,238	40.48%	4,077	50.96%	677	8.46%	8	0.10%	-839	-10.48%	8,000
Jefferson	2,251	49.97%	1,827	40.55%	407	9.03%	20	0.44%	424	9.42%	4,505
King	223,469	47.05%	218,457	46.00%	31,450	6.62%	1,559	0.33%	5,012	1.05%	474,935
Kitsap	22,273	55.94%	14,520	36.47%	2,986	7.50%	36	0.09%	7,753	19.47%	39,815
Kittitas	3,921	44.92%	4,212	48.25%	579	6.63%	17	0.19%	-291	-3.33%	8,729
Klickitat	2,454	47.44%	2,355	45.52%	357	6.90%	7	0.14%	99	1.92%	5,173
Lewis	8,444	45.23%	8,779	47.03%	1,428	7.65%	17	0.09%	-335	-1.80%	18,668
Lincoln	1,721	34.06%	2,994	59.25%	337	6.67%	1	0.02%	-1,273	-25.19%	5,053
Mason	4,540	52.85%	3,397	39.55%	638	7.43%	15	0.17%	1,143	13.30%	8,590
Okanogan	4,379	44.08%	4,490	45.19%	1,064	10.71%	2	0.02%	-111	-1.11%	9,935
Pacific	3,740	56.62%	2,491	37.71%	364	5.51%	10	0.15%	1,249	18.91%	6,605
Pend Oreille	1,350	49.74%	1,117	41.16%	245	9.03%	2	0.07%	233	8.58%	2,714
Pierce	72,670	53.54%	51,436	37.90%	11,391	8.39%	221	0.16%	21,234	15.64%	135,718
San Juan	685	34.90%	1,164	59.30%	108	5.50%	6	0.31%	-479	-24.40%	1,963
Skagit	10,529	46.60%	10,354	45.83%	1,667	7.38%	44	0.19%	175	0.77%	22,594
Skamania	1,221	51.30%	968	40.67%	189	7.94%	2	0.08%	253	10.63%	2,380
Snohomish	44,019	50.35%	36,252	41.47%	7,005	8.01%	148	0.17%	7,767	8.88%	87,424
Spokane	49,423	44.69%	52,650	47.61%	8,420	7.61%	101	0.09%	-3,227	-2.92%	110,594
Stevens	2,948	40.14%	3,435	46.77%	957	13.03%	5	0.07%	-487	-6.63%	7,345
Thurston	14,228	46.65%	13,742	45.06%	2,493	8.17%	36	0.12%	486	1.59%	30,499
Wahkiakum	899	53.67%	641	38.27%	131	7.82%	4	0.24%	258	15.40%	1,675
Walla Walla	5,841	34.52%	10,042	59.34%	1,028	6.07%	12	0.07%	-4,201	-24.82%	16,923
Whatcom	14,003	44.88%	14,695	47.10%	2,387	7.65%	114	0.37%	-692	-2.22%	31,199
Whitman	5,218	37.84%	7,810	56.64%	710	5.15%	51	0.37%	-2,592	-18.80%	13,789
Yakima	19,499	38.09%	27,488	53.69%	4,161	8.13%	50	0.10%	-7,989	-15.60%	51,198
Totals	616,037	47.23%	588,510	45.12%	96,990	7.44%	2,744	0.21%	27,527	2.11%	1,304,281

==== Counties that flipped from Democratic to Republican ====
- Benton
- Chelan
- Columbia
- Douglas
- Ferry
- Franklin
- Garfield
- Grant
- Island
- Kittitas
- Lewis
- Okanogan
- San Juan
- Spokane
- Stevens
- Walla Walla
- Whatcom
- Yakima

=== Results by congressional district ===
This table shows the results by congressional district. The candidate who won the largest amount of the vote nationally is shown first. Humphrey won 4 out of 7 of Washington's congressional districts while Nixon won the other 3 congressional districts.

District	Nixon	Humphrey	Wallace
1st	50%	44.9%	5.1%
2nd	44.5%	47.5%	8%
3rd	41.8%	51.5%	6.7%
4th	52.7%	38.7%	8.6%
5th	48.3%	43.5%	8.2%
6th	37.6%	54.2%	8.3%
7th	40.4%	51.7%	7.9%

== See also ==
- United States presidential elections in Washington (state)
