= 1932 United States presidential election in Washington (state) =

- November 8, 1932

All 8 Washington votes to the Electoral College

Nominee	Franklin D. Roosevelt	Herbert Hoover
Party	Democratic	Republican
Home state	New York	California
Running mate	John Nance Garner	Charles Curtis
Electoral vote	8	0
Popular vote	353,260	208,645
Percentage	57.46%	33.94%
County results
Roosevelt
40–50%
50–60%
60–70%
70–80%
President before election
Herbert Hoover
Republican
Elected President
Franklin D. Roosevelt
Democratic

The 1932 United States presidential election in Washington took place on November 8, 1932, as part of the 1932 United States presidential election. State voters chose eight representatives, or electors, to the Electoral College, who voted for president and vice president.

Outside a few Presidential and gubernatorial elections, Washington was a virtually one-party Republican state during the “System of 1896”, where the only competition was via Republican primaries. Apart from Woodrow Wilson’s two elections, during the first of which the GOP was severely divided, no Democrat after William Jennings Bryan in 1900 carried a single county in the state until Al Smith won German Catholic Ferry County in 1928.

However, since the 1928 election when Washington state had been won by more than 36 percentage points, the United States had fallen into the Great Depression, which had been particularly severe in the rural western parts of the nation. The New Deal was especially popular in the Pacific States, and as a result Roosevelt was assured of carrying the state.

Washington state was won by Governor Franklin D. Roosevelt (D–New York), running with Speaker John Nance Garner, with 57.46 percent of the popular vote, against incumbent President Herbert Hoover (R–California), running with Vice President Charles Curtis, with 33.94 percent of the popular vote. Roosevelt flipped every county won by his rival Hoover in 1928, becoming the first Democrat to sweep every county in Washington state – a feat he would repeat in 1936 but which has never been emulated since. He was the first-ever Democratic victor in the southwestern logging counties of Klickitat, Lewis and Pacific, and also in inland Benton County and Chelan County. Roosevelt was also the first Democrat since William Jennings Bryan in 1896, and only the second overall, to carry the state with an outright majority.

This was the last election in Washington in which voters chose presidential electors directly. The state adopted the modern "short ballot" starting with the 1936 election.

== Results ==
General Election Results
Party	Pledged to	Elector	Votes
Democratic Party	Franklin D. Roosevelt	William J. Lindberg	353,260
Democratic Party	Franklin D. Roosevelt	Eldrige Wheeler	352,463
Democratic Party	Franklin D. Roosevelt	Paul A. Newman	352,449
Democratic Party	Franklin D. Roosevelt	Henry S. Volkmar	352,192
Democratic Party	Franklin D. Roosevelt	H. C. Davis	352,179
Democratic Party	Franklin D. Roosevelt	Nella W. Hurd	351,891
Democratic Party	Franklin D. Roosevelt	Ben Spear	351,458
Democratic Party	Franklin D. Roosevelt	D. N. Judson	350,730
Republican Party	Herbert Hoover	Reno Odlin	208,645
Republican Party	Herbert Hoover	Alex Polson	208,479
Republican Party	Herbert Hoover	E. L. French	208,476
Republican Party	Herbert Hoover	Charles E. Myers	208,449
Republican Party	Herbert Hoover	Ione C. Earp	208,296
Republican Party	Herbert Hoover	Peter Henning	208,285
Republican Party	Herbert Hoover	William L. McCormick	208,238
Republican Party	Herbert Hoover	Bruce E. McGregor	207,767
Liberty Party	William Hope Harvey	Charles W. Baum	30,308
Liberty Party	William Hope Harvey	Roy Thomas	30,240
Liberty Party	William Hope Harvey	Edith Kathrens	30,194
Liberty Party	William Hope Harvey	R. A. Henderson	30,193
Liberty Party	William Hope Harvey	Doreen Eggleton	30,186
Liberty Party	William Hope Harvey	P. H. Thomson	30,178
Liberty Party	William Hope Harvey	George Cyre	30,172
Liberty Party	William Hope Harvey	A. V. Wallis	30,047
Socialist Party	Norman M. Thomas	George W. Scott	17,080
Socialist Party	Norman M. Thomas	A. R. Klein	16,844
Socialist Party	Norman M. Thomas	W. Hitchcock	16,818
Socialist Party	Norman M. Thomas	H. O. Fuhrberg	16,814
Socialist Party	Norman M. Thomas	J. Richard Brown	16,776
Socialist Party	Norman M. Thomas	J. L. Newlun	16,672
Socialist Party	Norman M. Thomas	C. H. Bungay	16,619
Socialist Party	Norman M. Thomas	Stella K. Garrison	16,502
Communist Party	William Z. Foster	Floyd E. Nell	2,972
Communist Party	William Z. Foster	Mrs. C. H. Harter	2,950
Communist Party	William Z. Foster	Joe Scott	2,946
Communist Party	William Z. Foster	W. F. Wilson	2,944
Communist Party	William Z. Foster	G. W. Westbloom	2,943
Communist Party	William Z. Foster	Charles Goold	2,931
Communist Party	William Z. Foster	H. G. Price	2,930
Communist Party	William Z. Foster	Alton E. Casler	2,928
Prohibition Party	William D. Upshaw	Charles L. Haggard	1,540
Prohibition Party	William D. Upshaw	Louis Ludwig Anderson	1,517
Prohibition Party	William D. Upshaw	Alice B. Bacon	1,508
Prohibition Party	William D. Upshaw	Canlipe Smith	1,503
Prohibition Party	William D. Upshaw	Asenath B. Weakley	1,502
Prohibition Party	William D. Upshaw	William E. Haycox	1,500
Prohibition Party	William D. Upshaw	Mary Dixon	1,490
Prohibition Party	William D. Upshaw	Alva T. Whig	1,484
Socialist Labor Party	Verne L. Reynolds	Lyle Clark	1,009
Socialist Labor Party	Verne L. Reynolds	William Klaunig	996
Socialist Labor Party	Verne L. Reynolds	Warren Joseph Chamberlain	980
Socialist Labor Party	Verne L. Reynolds	Fred Herrick	980
Socialist Labor Party	Verne L. Reynolds	Henry Genies	976
Socialist Labor Party	Verne L. Reynolds	Paul Swanson	976
Socialist Labor Party	Verne L. Reynolds	U. G. Stark	972
Socialist Labor Party	Verne L. Reynolds	Paul K. Tipton	967
Votes cast (Note: Based on totals for highest elector on each ticket)			614,814

=== Results by county ===
County	Franklin D. Roosevelt Democratic		Herbert Hoover Republican		William Hope Harvey Liberty		Norman Thomas Socialist		Other candidates Various parties		Margin		Total votes cast (Note: Based on highest elector on each ticket)
County	#	%	#	%	#	%	#	%	#	%	#	%	Total votes cast
Adams	1,504	61.89%	867	35.68%	8	0.33%	43	1.77%	8	0.33%	637	26.21%	2,430
Asotin	1,994	65.33%	960	31.45%	16	0.52%	58	1.90%	24	0.79%	1,034	33.88%	3,052
Benton	2,633	57.28%	1,694	36.85%	143	3.11%	89	1.94%	38	0.83%	939	20.43%	4,597
Chelan	7,316	52.79%	5,584	40.29%	808	5.83%	109	0.79%	42	0.30%	1,732	12.50%	13,859
Clallam	3,954	52.46%	1,870	24.81%	1,542	20.46%	92	1.22%	79	1.05%	2,084	27.65%	7,537
Clark	9,104	60.05%	4,901	32.33%	727	4.80%	302	1.99%	126	0.83%	4,203	27.72%	15,160
Columbia	1,491	64.88%	714	31.07%	4	0.17%	63	2.74%	26	1.13%	777	33.81%	2,298
Cowlitz	5,443	48.98%	3,767	33.90%	1,666	14.99%	167	1.50%	70	0.63%	1,676	15.08%	11,113
Douglas	1,941	57.73%	1,179	35.07%	165	4.91%	66	1.96%	11	0.33%	762	22.67%	3,362
Ferry	1,035	71.63%	322	22.28%	37	2.56%	44	3.04%	7	0.48%	713	49.34%	1,445
Franklin	1,540	62.27%	838	33.89%	12	0.49%	72	2.91%	11	0.44%	702	28.39%	2,473
Garfield	818	54.32%	669	44.42%	10	0.66%	1	0.07%	8	0.53%	149	9.89%	1,506
Grant	1,376	57.10%	840	34.85%	111	4.61%	71	2.95%	12	0.50%	536	22.24%	2,410
Grays Harbor	10,310	55.92%	5,141	27.89%	2,579	13.99%	136	0.74%	270	1.46%	5,169	28.04%	18,436
Island	1,517	56.99%	803	30.17%	270	10.14%	49	1.84%	23	0.86%	714	26.82%	2,662
Jefferson	1,994	61.03%	952	29.14%	266	8.14%	39	1.19%	16	0.49%	1,042	31.89%	3,267
King	108,738	59.09%	63,346	34.42%	4,004	2.18%	6,547	3.56%	1,396	0.76%	45,392	24.67%	184,031
Kitsap	10,002	70.57%	3,465	24.45%	361	2.55%	237	1.67%	108	0.76%	6,537	46.12%	14,173
Kittitas	4,266	63.82%	1,963	29.37%	281	4.20%	97	1.45%	77	1.15%	2,303	34.46%	6,684
Klickitat	2,155	59.15%	1,335	36.65%	29	0.80%	71	1.95%	53	1.45%	820	22.51%	3,643
Lewis	8,454	54.21%	4,647	29.80%	2,305	14.78%	87	0.56%	101	0.65%	3,807	24.41%	15,594
Lincoln	2,725	59.30%	1,748	38.04%	23	0.50%	79	1.72%	20	0.44%	977	21.26%	4,595
Mason	2,181	55.89%	995	25.50%	675	17.30%	39	1.00%	12	0.31%	1,186	30.39%	3,902
Okanogan	3,969	57.13%	2,277	32.78%	578	8.32%	89	1.28%	34	0.49%	1,692	24.36%	6,947
Pacific	3,099	55.46%	1,737	31.08%	612	10.95%	65	1.16%	75	1.34%	1,362	24.37%	5,588
Pend Oreille	1,772	64.18%	855	30.97%	8	0.29%	113	4.09%	13	0.47%	917	33.21%	2,761
Pierce	38,451	58.86%	19,006	29.09%	5,183	7.93%	2,084	3.19%	603	0.92%	19,445	29.77%	65,327
San Juan	786	52.37%	607	40.44%	90	6.00%	12	0.80%	6	0.40%	179	11.93%	1,501
Skagit	8,395	60.45%	4,246	30.57%	592	4.26%	163	1.17%	492	3.54%	4,149	29.87%	13,888
Skamania	934	63.89%	444	30.37%	20	1.37%	53	3.63%	11	0.75%	490	33.52%	1,462
Snohomish	18,352	59.27%	9,310	30.07%	1,936	6.25%	1,052	3.40%	313	1.01%	9,042	29.20%	30,963
Spokane	36,953	56.74%	24,848	38.15%	268	0.41%	2,610	4.01%	446	0.68%	12,105	18.59%	65,125
Stevens	4,262	60.94%	2,247	32.13%	93	1.33%	331	4.73%	61	0.87%	2,015	28.81%	6,994
Thurston	6,308	45.97%	4,241	30.91%	2,876	20.96%	132	0.96%	165	1.20%	2,067	15.06%	13,722
Wahkiakum	730	53.52%	442	32.40%	161	11.80%	14	1.03%	17	1.25%	288	21.11%	1,364
Walla Walla	5,578	52.75%	4,653	44.00%	15	0.14%	275	2.60%	54	0.51%	925	8.75%	10,575
Whatcom	11,355	50.44%	9,254	41.11%	414	1.84%	1,015	4.51%	473	2.10%	2,101	9.33%	22,511
Whitman	5,945	53.99%	4,727	42.93%	18	0.16%	261	2.37%	60	0.54%	1,218	11.06%	11,011
Yakima	13,880	51.70%	11,151	41.54%	1,402	5.22%	253	0.94%	160	0.60%	2,729	10.17%	26,846
Totals	353,260	57.46%	208,645	33.94%	30,308	4.93%	17,080	2.78%	5,521	0.90%	144,615	23.52%	614,814

==== Counties that flipped from Republican to Democratic ====
- Adams
- Asotin
- Benton
- Chelan
- Clallam
- Clark
- Columbia
- Cowlitz
- Douglas
- Franklin
- Garfield
- Grant
- Grays Harbor
- Island
- Jefferson
- King
- Kitsap
- Kittitas
- Klickitat
- Lewis
- Lincoln
- Mason
- Okanogan
- Pacific
- Pend Oreille
- Pierce
- San Juan
- Skagit
- Skamania
- Snohomish
- Spokane
- Stevens
- Thurston
- Wahkiakum
- Walla Walla
- Whatcom
- Whitman
- Yakima

== See also ==
- United States presidential elections in Washington (state)
