= 1960 United States presidential election in Washington (state) =

- November 8, 1960

Nominee	Richard Nixon	John F. Kennedy
Party	Republican	Democratic
Home state	California	Massachusetts
Running mate	Henry Cabot Lodge Jr.	Lyndon B. Johnson
Electoral vote	9	0
Popular vote	629,273	599,298
Percentage	50.68%	48.27%
County results
Nixon
40–50%
50–60%
60–70%
Kennedy
50–60%
President before election
Dwight D. Eisenhower
Republican
Elected President
John F. Kennedy
Democratic

The 1960 United States presidential election in Washington took place on November 8, 1960, as part of the 1960 United States presidential election. State voters chose nine representatives, or electors, to the Electoral College, who voted for president and vice president.

Washington was won by incumbent Vice President Richard Nixon (R–California), running with United States Ambassador to the United Nations Henry Cabot Lodge Jr., with 50.68% of the popular vote, against Senator John F. Kennedy (D–Massachusetts), running with Senator Lyndon B. Johnson, with 48.27% of the popular vote.

This was the first time since 1892 that Washington state backed a losing Republican candidate, though it did back Progressive candidate and former Republican Theodore Roosevelt in his third party bid in 1912.

== Results ==
1960 United States presidential election in Washington
Party	Candidate	Votes	%
Republican	Richard Nixon	629,273	50.68%
Democratic	John F. Kennedy	599,298	48.27%
Socialist Labor	Eric Hass	10,895	0.88%
Constitution	Merritt Curtis	1,401	0.11%
Socialist Workers	Farrell Dobbs	705	0.06%
Total votes		1,241,572	100%

=== Results by county ===
County	Richard Nixon Republican		John F. Kennedy Democratic		Other candidates Various parties		Margin		Total votes cast
County	#	%	#	%	#	%	#	%	Total votes cast
Adams	2,479	58.80%	1,732	41.08%	5	0.12%	747	17.72%	4,216
Asotin	2,640	46.00%	3,093	53.89%	6	0.10%	-453	-7.89%	5,739
Benton	13,797	52.37%	12,518	47.52%	29	0.11%	1,279	4.85%	26,344
Chelan	9,854	54.10%	8,177	44.89%	183	1.00%	1,677	9.21%	18,214
Clallam	6,227	47.61%	6,801	52.00%	52	0.40%	-574	-4.39%	13,080
Clark	20,080	49.13%	20,771	50.82%	17	0.04%	-691	-1.69%	40,868
Columbia	1,301	62.13%	793	37.87%	0	0.00%	508	24.26%	2,094
Cowlitz	12,103	49.79%	12,054	49.58%	153	0.63%	49	0.21%	24,310
Douglas	3,241	51.07%	3,087	48.64%	18	0.28%	154	2.43%	6,346
Ferry	623	40.30%	921	59.57%	2	0.13%	-298	-19.27%	1,546
Franklin	4,201	44.65%	5,156	54.80%	52	0.55%	-955	-10.15%	9,409
Garfield	914	56.88%	690	42.94%	3	0.19%	224	13.94%	1,607
Grant	7,568	50.44%	7,400	49.32%	37	0.25%	168	1.12%	15,005
Grays Harbor	10,067	41.94%	13,773	57.37%	166	0.69%	-3,706	-15.43%	24,006
Island	3,596	59.01%	2,470	40.53%	28	0.46%	1,126	18.48%	6,094
Jefferson	2,103	48.83%	2,197	51.01%	7	0.16%	-94	-2.18%	4,307
King	224,150	50.85%	208,756	47.36%	7,904	1.79%	15,394	3.49%	440,810
Kitsap	17,459	46.80%	19,662	52.71%	181	0.49%	-2,203	-5.91%	37,302
Kittitas	4,640	51.83%	4,303	48.06%	10	0.11%	337	3.77%	8,953
Klickitat	2,836	50.69%	2,744	49.04%	15	0.27%	92	1.65%	5,595
Lewis	11,012	56.53%	8,411	43.18%	57	0.29%	2,601	13.35%	19,480
Lincoln	3,211	58.77%	2,248	41.14%	5	0.09%	963	17.63%	5,464
Mason	3,703	46.86%	4,183	52.94%	16	0.20%	-480	-6.08%	7,902
Okanogan	5,169	48.32%	5,507	51.48%	22	0.21%	-338	-3.16%	10,698
Pacific	3,224	45.47%	3,837	54.12%	29	0.41%	-613	-8.65%	7,090
Pend Oreille	1,305	44.19%	1,641	55.57%	7	0.24%	-336	-11.38%	2,953
Pierce	57,188	46.32%	64,292	52.07%	1,995	1.62%	-7,104	-5.75%	123,475
San Juan	1,112	63.91%	624	35.86%	4	0.23%	488	28.05%	1,740
Skagit	12,168	52.40%	11,003	47.39%	49	0.21%	1,165	5.01%	23,220
Skamania	1,032	44.75%	1,269	55.03%	5	0.22%	-237	-10.28%	2,306
Snohomish	33,731	46.10%	38,793	53.02%	639	0.87%	-5,062	-6.92%	73,163
Spokane	59,557	51.62%	55,553	48.15%	259	0.22%	4,004	3.47%	115,369
Stevens	4,076	51.24%	3,861	48.54%	18	0.23%	215	2.70%	7,955
Thurston	13,921	54.37%	11,620	45.38%	65	0.25%	2,301	8.99%	25,606
Wahkiakum	796	46.23%	923	53.60%	3	0.17%	-127	-7.37%	1,722
Walla Walla	11,786	63.64%	6,721	36.29%	12	0.06%	5,065	27.35%	18,519
Whatcom	16,651	52.82%	14,298	45.35%	577	1.83%	2,353	7.47%	31,526
Whitman	8,069	59.58%	5,458	40.30%	17	0.13%	2,611	19.28%	13,544
Yakima	31,683	58.68%	21,958	40.67%	354	0.66%	9,725	18.01%	53,995
Totals	629,273	50.68%	599,298	48.27%	13,001	1.05%	29,975	2.41%	1,241,572

==== Counties that flipped from Democratic to Republican ====
- Cowlitz
- Douglas
- Grant

==== Counties that flipped from Republican to Democratic ====
- Asotin
- Clallam
- Jefferson
- Mason
- Okanogan

== See also ==
- United States presidential elections in Washington (state)
