= United States presidential elections in Washington (state) =

Presidential elections in Washington
- Map of the United States with Washington highlighted
- Number of elections: 34
- Voted Democratic: 19
- Voted Republican: 14
- Voted other: 1 (Note: Won in 1912 by Theodore Roosevelt, who ran as a Progressive Party candidate.)
- Voted for winning candidate: 23
- Voted for losing candidate: 11

Washington is a state in the Pacific Northwest region of the United States. Since its admission to the Union in November 1889, the state has participated in 34 United States presidential elections. It has had twelve electoral votes since 2012, when it gained a tenth congressional district during reapportionment based on the results of the 2010 U.S. census. Washington has conducted its presidential elections through mail-in voting since 2012 for general elections and 2016 for party primaries.

In the 1892 presidential election, the first since Washington became a state, President Benjamin Harrison received 41.45% of the popular vote and obtained Washington's four electoral votes in his unsuccessful re-election campaign. From 1892 to 2024, the state has voted for 15 Republican or third-party presidential candidates and 19 Democratic presidential candidates; Washington has voted for the losing presidential candidate in 11 elections. Washington generally favored the Republican Party in presidential elections until 1932, reflecting its state and congressional voting patterns. The state was won by Progressive Party presidential nominee Theodore Roosevelt in the 1912 election; Roosevelt, who had been a Republican during his presidency, is the only third party candidate to have won Washington's presidential election.

From 1932 to 1948, Democratic candidates won Washington in landslide victories for the presidency and state offices as a result of the Great Depression and New Deal. Washington was characterized as a swing state for the remainder of the 20th century and voted 21 times for the winning candidate from 1892 to 1996. The state's voters often had split-ticket ballots with candidates from multiple political parties, which was reflected by Democrats and Republicans alternately holding state offices and majorities in the state legislature. Since 1984, no Republican candidate has won a presidential election in Washington; the state's governors have been Democrats since 1980. The state has had five faithless electors in the Electoral College who cast ballots for people other than their pledged candidates; these votes were voided and the electors were fined under the state law at the time. An elector in the 1976 election voted for Ronald Reagan instead of Gerald Ford, who had won the state's nine electoral votes. In the 2016 election, four of the twelve electors from Washington declined to vote for Hillary Clinton; three cast their ballots for former general and Secretary of State Colin Powell and one for Faith Spotted Eagle, an indigenous political activist.

The Cascade Mountains mark the boundary between the western and eastern regions of Washington, which have differences in culture, climate, and politics. Historically, Western Washington has been generally characterized as liberal or progressive, while Eastern Washington has been characterized as conservative. The suburban areas of the Seattle metropolitan area, which contains the majority of the state's population, became a reliably Democratic area in the late 20th century and solidified Washington as a blue state. Washington is among 18 states collectively referred to as the "blue wall", coined in 2009 by journalist Ron Brownstein, due to their strong preference for Democrats.

The state adopted a single-ballot blanket primary system in 1936 to replace earlier party primaries; until 2020, these were non-binding and not used to determine delegates in national party conventions. In 2010, Washington signed the National Popular Vote Interstate Compact, an interstate compact in which signatories award all of their electoral votes to the winner of the federal-level popular vote in a presidential election regardless of the state's vote. As of 2024, the compact has been signed by 17 states and the District of Columbia, but has not reached the threshold of 270 electoral votes to take effect.

== Presidential elections ==
Key for parties
American Independent Party – (AI)
Constitution Party – (C)
Democratic Party – (D)
Farmer-Labor Party – (FL)
Green Party – (G)
Independent candidate – (I)
Libertarian Party – (LI)
Libertarian Party – (LI-1932)
People's Party – (PO)
Prohibition Party – (PRO)
Progressive Party (1912) – (PR-1912)
Progressive Party (1924) – (PR-1924)
Progressive Party (1948) – (PR-1948)
Reform Party – (RE)
Republican Party – (R)
Socialist Party – (S)
Socialist Labor Party – (SLP)
Union Party – (U)
We the People Party – (WP)

Note – A double dagger (‡) indicates the national winner.
Note – Percentages may not total 100.0% because of rounding.

Presidential elections in Arizona from 1912 to present
Year	Winner			Runner-up			Third-place			EV	Refs.
Year	Candidate	Votes	%	Candidate	Votes	%	Candidate	Votes	%	EV	Refs.
1892	Benjamin Harrison (R)	36,460	41.4%	Grover Cleveland (D)‡	29,802	33.9%	James B. Weaver (PO)	19,165	21.8%	4	
1896	William Jennings Bryan (D)	53,314	57.0%	William McKinley (R)‡	39,153	41.8%	Joshua Levering (PRO)	968	1.0%	4	
1900	William McKinley (R)‡	57,456	53.4%	William Jennings Bryan (D)	44,833	41.7%	John Woolley (PRO)	2,363	2.2%	4	
1904	Theodore Roosevelt (R)‡	101,540	70.0%	Alton B. Parker (D)	28,098	19.4%	Eugene V. Debs (S)	10,023	6.9%	5	
1908	William Howard Taft (R)‡	106,062	57.7%	William Jennings Bryan (D)	58,691	31.9%	Eugene V. Debs (S)	14,177	7.7%	5	
1912	Theodore Roosevelt (PR-1912)	113,698	35.2%	Woodrow Wilson (D)‡	86,840	26.9%	William Howard Taft (R)	70,445	21.8%	7	
1916	Woodrow Wilson (D)‡	183,388	48.1%	Charles Evans Hughes (R)	167,208	43.9%	Allan L. Benson (S)	22,800	6.0%	7	
1920	Warren G. Harding (R)‡	223,137	56.0%	James M. Cox (D)	84,298	21.1%	Parley P. Christensen (FL)	77,246	19.4%	7	
1924	Calvin Coolidge (R)‡	220,224	52.2%	Robert M. La Follette (PR-1924)	150,727	35.8%	John W. Davis (D)	42,842	10.2%	7	
1928	Herbert Hoover (R)‡	335,844	67.1%	Al Smith (D)	156,772	31.3%	Verne L. Reynolds (SLP)	4,068	0.8%	7	
1932	Franklin D. Roosevelt (D)‡	353,260	57.5%	Herbert Hoover (R)	208,645	33.9%	William Hope Harvey (LI-1932)	30,308	4.9%	8	
1936	Franklin D. Roosevelt (D)‡	459,579	66.4%	Alf Landon (R)	206,892	29.9%	William Lemke (U)	17,463	2.5%	8	
1940	Franklin D. Roosevelt (D)‡	462,145	58.2%	Wendell Willkie (R)	322,123	40.6%	Norman Thomas (S)	4,586	0.6%	8	
1944	Franklin D. Roosevelt (D)‡	486,774	56.8%	Thomas E. Dewey (R)	361,689	42.2%	Norman Thomas (S)	3,824	0.4%	8	
1948	Harry S. Truman (D)‡	476,165	52.6%	Thomas E. Dewey (R)	386,315	42.7%	Henry A. Wallace (PR-1948)	31,692	3.5%	8	
1952	Dwight D. Eisenhower (R)‡	599,107	54.3%	Adlai Stevenson (D)	492,845	44.7%	Douglas MacArthur (C)	7,290	0.7%	9	
1956	Dwight D. Eisenhower (R)‡	620,430	53.9%	Adlai Stevenson (D)	523,002	45.4%	Eric Hass (SLP)	7,457	0.6%	9	
1960	Richard Nixon (R)	629,273	50.7%	John F. Kennedy (D)‡	599,298	48.3%	Eric Hass (SLP)	10,895	0.9%	9	
1964	Lyndon B. Johnson (D)‡	779,881	62.0%	Barry Goldwater (R)	470,366	37.4%	Eric Hass (SLP)	7,772	0.6%	9	
1968	Hubert Humphrey (D)	616,037	47.2%	Richard Nixon (R)‡	588,510	45.1%	George Wallace (AI)	96,990	7.4%	9	
1972	Richard Nixon (R)‡	837,135	56.9%	George McGovern (D)	568,334	38.6%	John G. Schmitz (AI)	58,906	4%	9	
1976	Gerald Ford (R)	777,732	50.0%	Jimmy Carter (D)‡	717,323	46.1%	Eugene McCarthy (I)	36,986	2.4%	8 (Note: One faithless elector voted for Ronald Reagan for president and Bob Dole for vice president.)	
1980	Ronald Reagan (R)‡	865,244	49.7%	Jimmy Carter (D)	650,193	37.3%	John B. Anderson (I)	185,073	10.6%	9	
1984	Ronald Reagan (R)‡	1,051,670	55.8%	Walter Mondale (D)	807,352	42.9%	David Bergland (LI)	8,844	0.5%	10	
1988	Michael Dukakis (D)	933,516	50.0%	George H. W. Bush (R)‡	903,835	48.5%	Ron Paul (LI)	17,240	0.9%	10	
1992	Bill Clinton (D)‡	993,037	43.4%	George H. W. Bush (R)	731,234	32.0%	Ross Perot (I)	541,780	23.7%	11	
1996	Bill Clinton (D)‡	1,123,323	49.8%	Bob Dole (R)	840,712	37.3%	Ross Perot (RE)	201,003	8.9%	11	
2000	Al Gore (D)	1,247,652	50.1%	George W. Bush (R)‡	1,108,864	44.6%	Ralph Nader (G)	103,002	4.1%	11	
2004	John Kerry (D)	1,510,201	52.8%	George W. Bush (R)‡	1,304,894	45.6%	Ralph Nader (I)	23,283	0.8%	11	
2008	Barack Obama (D)‡	1,750,848	57.3%	John McCain (R)	1,229,216	40.3%	Ralph Nader (I)	29,489	1%	11	
2012	Barack Obama (D)‡	1,755,396	55.8%	Mitt Romney (R)	1,290,670	41.0%	Gary Johnson (LI)	42,202	1.3%	12	
2016	Hillary Clinton (D)	1,742,718	52.5%	Donald Trump (R)‡	1,221,747	36.8%	Gary Johnson (LI)	160,879	4.9%	8 (Note: Clinton earned 12 pledged electoral votes, but lost four to faithless electors. Three electors voted for Colin Powell for president and Elizabeth Warren, Maria Cantwell, and Susan Collins for vice president, while Robert Satiacum Jr. voted for Faith Spotted Eagle for president and Winona LaDuke for vice president.)	
2020	Joe Biden (D)‡	2,369,612	58.0%	Donald Trump (R)	1,584,651	38.8%	Jo Jorgensen (LI)	80,500	2%	12	
2024	Kamala Harris (D)	2,245,849	57.2%	Donald Trump (R)‡	1,530,923	39.0%	Robert F. Kennedy Jr.(withdrawn) (WP)	54,868	1.4%	12	

== See also ==
- Elections in Washington (state)

== Works cited ==
- Guide to U.S. Elections. Washington, D.C.: CQ Press. 2010. ISBN 978-1-60426-536-1. OCLC 430736650.
- Presidential elections, 1789–1996. Washington, D.C.: Congressional Quarterly. 1997. ISBN 978-1-56802-065-5. LCCN 97019084. OCLC 36847803.
