= 1940 United States presidential election in Washington (state) =

- November 5, 1940

All 8 Washington votes to the Electoral College

Nominee	Franklin D. Roosevelt	Wendell Willkie
Party	Democratic	Republican
Home state	New York	New York
Running mate	Henry A. Wallace	Charles L. McNary
Electoral vote	8	0
Popular vote	462,145	322,123
Percentage	58.22%	40.58%
County results
Roosevelt
40–50%
50–60%
60–70%
70–80%
Willkie
40–50%
50–60%
President before election
Franklin D. Roosevelt
Democratic
Elected President
Franklin D. Roosevelt
Democratic

The 1940 United States presidential election in Washington took place on November 5, 1940, as part of the 1940 United States presidential election. Voters chose eight representatives, or electors, to the Electoral College, who voted for president and vice president.

Washington was won by incumbent President Franklin D. Roosevelt (D–New York), running with Secretary Henry A. Wallace, with 58.22% of the popular vote, against Wendell Willkie (R–New York), running with Minority Leader Charles L. McNary, with 40.58% of the popular vote.

== Results ==
1940 United States presidential election in Washington
Party	Candidate	Votes	%
Democratic	Franklin D. Roosevelt (inc.)	462,145	58.22%
Republican	Wendell Willkie	322,123	40.58%
Socialist	Norman Thomas	4,586	0.58%
Communist	Earl Browder	2,626	0.33%
Prohibition	Roger Babson	1,686	0.21%
Socialist Labor	John W. Aiken	667	0.08%
Total votes		793,833	100%

=== Results by county ===
County	Franklin D. Roosevelt Democratic		Wendell Willkie Republican		Other candidates Various parties		Margin		Total votes cast
County	#	%	#	%	#	%	#	%	Total votes cast
Adams	1,397	47.88%	1,508	51.68%	13	0.45%	-111	-3.80%	2,918
Asotin	2,107	58.35%	1,483	41.07%	21	0.58%	624	17.28%	3,611
Benton	2,414	46.97%	2,670	51.96%	55	1.07%	-256	-4.98%	5,139
Chelan	7,181	47.02%	8,019	52.50%	73	0.48%	-838	-5.49%	15,273
Clallam	5,966	61.95%	3,555	36.91%	110	1.14%	2,411	25.03%	9,631
Clark	12,931	58.98%	8,776	40.03%	218	0.99%	4,155	18.95%	21,925
Columbia	1,218	45.36%	1,461	54.41%	6	0.22%	-243	-9.05%	2,685
Cowlitz	11,420	64.47%	6,078	34.31%	216	1.22%	5,342	30.16%	17,714
Douglas	1,972	49.66%	1,959	49.33%	40	1.01%	13	0.33%	3,971
Ferry	1,247	67.44%	590	31.91%	12	0.65%	657	35.53%	1,849
Franklin	1,868	62.62%	1,084	36.34%	31	1.04%	784	26.28%	2,983
Garfield	714	41.34%	1,003	58.08%	10	0.58%	-289	-16.73%	1,727
Grant	4,097	73.15%	1,487	26.55%	17	0.30%	2,610	46.60%	5,601
Grays Harbor	14,861	63.27%	8,369	35.63%	257	1.09%	6,492	27.64%	23,487
Island	1,626	53.19%	1,371	44.85%	60	1.96%	255	8.34%	3,057
Jefferson	2,083	56.99%	1,540	42.13%	32	0.88%	543	14.86%	3,655
King	143,134	59.19%	95,504	39.50%	3,165	1.31%	47,630	19.70%	241,803
Kitsap	13,861	70.73%	5,525	28.19%	210	1.07%	8,336	42.54%	19,596
Kittitas	5,203	60.08%	3,401	39.27%	56	0.65%	1,802	20.81%	8,660
Klickitat	2,627	54.80%	2,139	44.62%	28	0.58%	488	10.18%	4,794
Lewis	9,280	49.56%	9,228	49.28%	218	1.16%	52	0.28%	18,726
Lincoln	2,896	52.16%	2,627	47.32%	29	0.52%	269	4.85%	5,552
Mason	3,465	64.81%	1,775	33.20%	106	1.98%	1,690	31.61%	5,346
Okanogan	5,362	55.54%	4,244	43.96%	49	0.51%	1,118	11.58%	9,655
Pacific	4,393	61.48%	2,704	37.84%	48	0.67%	1,689	23.64%	7,145
Pend Oreille	1,812	58.51%	1,268	40.94%	17	0.55%	544	17.57%	3,097
Pierce	51,670	64.34%	27,188	33.85%	1,453	1.81%	24,482	30.48%	80,311
San Juan	860	51.34%	808	48.24%	7	0.42%	52	3.10%	1,675
Skagit	9,796	54.51%	7,985	44.44%	189	1.05%	1,811	10.08%	17,970
Skamania	1,292	62.15%	765	36.80%	22	1.06%	527	25.35%	2,079
Snohomish	26,185	64.52%	13,638	33.60%	762	1.88%	12,547	30.92%	40,585
Spokane	44,852	56.92%	33,228	42.17%	713	0.90%	11,624	14.75%	78,793
Stevens	4,904	59.75%	3,238	39.45%	66	0.80%	1,666	20.30%	8,208
Thurston	11,092	59.72%	7,275	39.17%	206	1.11%	3,817	20.55%	18,573
Wahkiakum	1,164	63.78%	642	35.18%	19	1.04%	522	28.60%	1,825
Walla Walla	5,875	42.51%	7,883	57.04%	63	0.46%	-2,008	-14.53%	13,821
Whatcom	14,877	51.60%	13,351	46.30%	606	2.10%	1,526	5.29%	28,834
Whitman	6,351	49.62%	6,356	49.66%	92	0.72%	-5	-0.04%	12,799
Yakima	18,092	46.68%	20,398	52.63%	270	0.70%	-2,306	-5.95%	38,760
Totals	462,145	58.22%	322,123	40.58%	9,565	1.20%	140,022	17.64%	793,833

==== Counties that flipped from Democratic to Republican ====
- Adams
- Benton
- Chelan
- Columbia
- Garfield
- Walla Walla
- Whitman
- Yakima

== See also ==
- United States presidential elections in Washington (state)
