= 1908 United States presidential election in Washington (state) =

- November 3, 1908

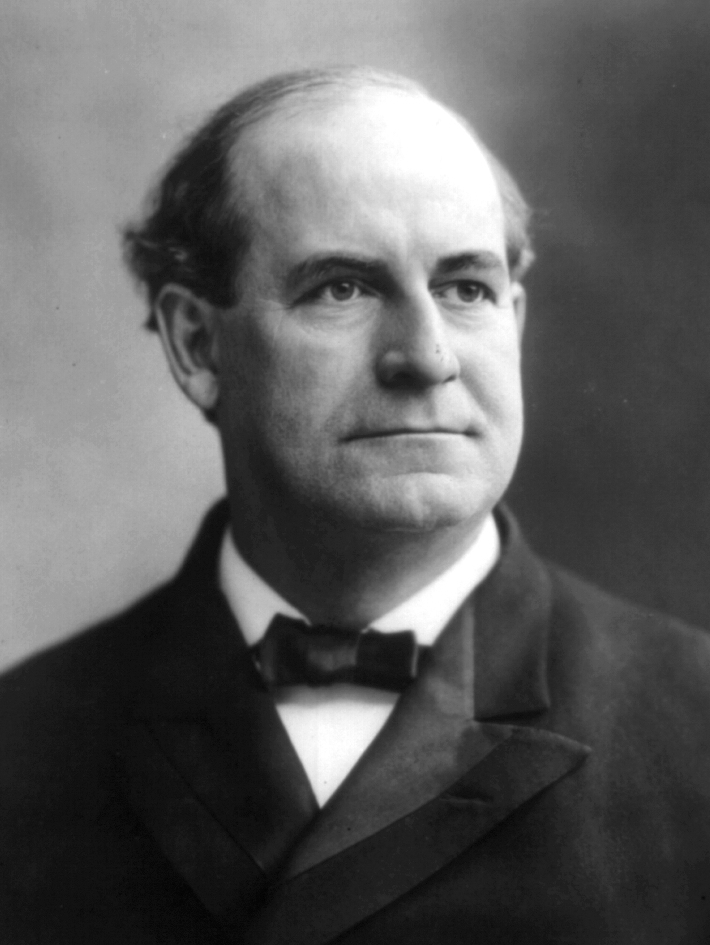

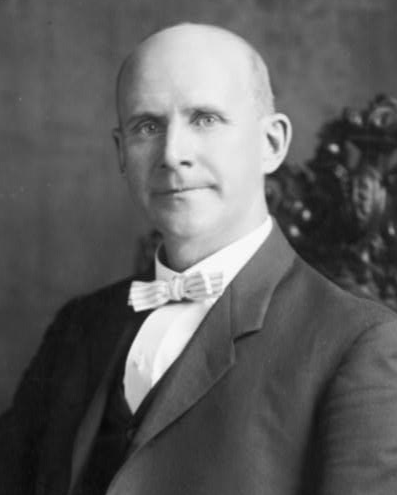
Nominee	William Howard Taft	William Jennings Bryan	Eugene V. Debs
Party	Republican	Democratic	Socialist
Home state	Ohio	Nebraska	Indiana
Running mate	James S. Sherman	John W. Kern	Ben Hanford
Electoral vote	5	0	0
Popular vote	106,062	58,691	14,177
Percentage	57.68%	31.92%	7.71%
County results
Taft
40–50%
50–60%
60–70%
70–80%
President before election
Theodore Roosevelt
Republican
Elected President
William Howard Taft
Republican

The 1908 United States presidential election in Washington took place on November 3, 1908. All contemporary 46 states were part of the 1908 United States presidential election. Voters chose five electors to the Electoral College, which selected the president and vice president.

Washington had been established earlier in the 1900s as a one-party Republican bastion, which it would remain at a Presidential level apart from the 1910s GOP split until Franklin D. Roosevelt rose to power in 1932, and more or less continuously at state level during this era. Democratic representation in the Washington legislature would during this period at times be countable on one hand. Republican primaries would take over as the chief mode of political competition when introduced later in the decade.

Roosevelt's great popularity in the state ensured his handpicked successor William Howard Taft would win Washington by a margin of 25.76% and without much difficulty, although because Democratic presidential candidate William Jennings Bryan retained some popularity from previous campaigns in this state, Taft could not equal Roosevelt's huge win from four years earlier. Bryan had previously won the state against William McKinley in 1896 but would later lose the state to McKinley in 1900.

== Results ==
General Election Results
Party	Pledged to	Elector	Votes
Republican Party	William Howard Taft	John R. O'Donnell	106,062
Republican Party	William Howard Taft	William Pitt Trimble	105,731
Republican Party	William Howard Taft	J. M. Fish	105,709
Republican Party	William Howard Taft	Frank M. Dallam	105,580
Republican Party	William Howard Taft	Charles E. Curlee	105,519
Democratic Party	William Jennings Bryan	W. J. Byham	58,691
Democratic Party	William Jennings Bryan	N. K. Mead	58,437
Democratic Party	William Jennings Bryan	J. M. McKeirnan	58,383
Democratic Party	William Jennings Bryan	Wilmon Tucker	58,293
Democratic Party	William Jennings Bryan	Frank M. Lamborn	58,206
Socialist Party	Eugene V. Debs	J. W. Morris	14,177
Socialist Party	Eugene V. Debs	J. G. Elliott	14,151
Socialist Party	Eugene V. Debs	J. E. Janes	14,117
Socialist Party	Eugene V. Debs	W. H. Harris	14,114
Socialist Party	Eugene V. Debs	C. L. Whiting	14,104
Prohibition Party	Eugene W. Chafin	T. E. Webb	4,700
Prohibition Party	Eugene W. Chafin	J. W. Lockhart	4,689
Prohibition Party	Eugene W. Chafin	H. C. Byron	4,687
Prohibition Party	Eugene W. Chafin	W. B. Eakin	4,675
Prohibition Party	Eugene W. Chafin	C. C. Gridley	4,664
Independence Party	Thomas L. Hisgen	Homer O. Campbell	249
Independence Party	Thomas L. Hisgen	George W. McCauley	249
Independence Party	Thomas L. Hisgen	Thomas G. Albin	248
Independence Party	Thomas L. Hisgen	Joseph C. Sharp	244
Independence Party	Thomas L. Hisgen	W. L. Woodring	243
Votes cast (Note: Based on totals for highest elector on each ticket)			183,879

=== Results by county ===
County	William Howard Taft Republican		William Jennings Bryan Democratic		Eugene V. Debs Socialist		Eugene W. Chafin Prohibition		Thomas L. Hisgen Independence		Margin		Total votes cast (Note: Based on highest elector on each ticket)
County	#	%	#	%	#	%	#	%	#	%	#	%	Total votes cast
Adams	1,033	55.81%	714	38.57%	58	3.13%	45	2.43%	1	0.05%	319	17.23%	1,851
Asotin	648	59.61%	365	33.58%	36	3.31%	38	3.50%	0	0.00%	283	26.03%	1,087
Benton	891	57.74%	465	30.14%	151	9.79%	34	2.20%	2	0.13%	426	27.61%	1,543
Chehalis	3,128	60.35%	1,248	24.08%	712	13.74%	86	1.66%	9	0.17%	1,880	36.27%	5,183
Chelan	1,639	59.71%	871	31.73%	160	5.83%	66	2.40%	9	0.33%	768	27.98%	2,745
Clallam	938	59.59%	428	27.19%	187	11.88%	11	0.70%	10	0.64%	510	32.40%	1,574
Clarke	2,416	58.83%	1,250	30.44%	335	8.16%	104	2.53%	2	0.05%	1,166	28.39%	4,107
Columbia	887	57.41%	585	37.86%	25	1.62%	48	3.11%	0	0.00%	302	19.55%	1,545
Cowlitz	1,573	65.65%	617	25.75%	172	7.18%	28	1.17%	6	0.25%	956	39.90%	2,396
Douglas	1,942	52.20%	1,540	41.40%	191	5.13%	43	1.16%	4	0.11%	402	10.81%	3,720
Ferry	467	47.17%	393	39.70%	115	11.62%	11	1.11%	4	0.40%	74	7.47%	990
Franklin	643	52.97%	485	39.95%	56	4.61%	27	2.22%	3	0.25%	158	13.01%	1,214
Garfield	556	58.53%	333	35.05%	40	4.21%	13	1.37%	8	0.84%	223	23.47%	950
Island	450	58.21%	192	24.84%	99	12.81%	28	3.62%	4	0.52%	258	33.38%	773
Jefferson	859	63.16%	417	30.66%	66	4.85%	11	0.81%	7	0.51%	442	32.50%	1,360
King	22,297	55.75%	14,644	36.62%	2,173	5.43%	836	2.09%	43	0.11%	7,653	19.14%	39,993
Kitsap	1,819	56.12%	850	26.23%	494	15.24%	74	2.28%	4	0.12%	969	29.90%	3,241
Kittitas	1,752	56.23%	985	31.61%	314	10.08%	64	2.05%	1	0.03%	767	24.61%	3,116
Klickitat	1,245	61.12%	570	27.98%	173	8.49%	46	2.26%	3	0.15%	675	33.14%	2,037
Lewis	3,170	60.45%	1,412	26.93%	528	10.07%	120	2.29%	14	0.27%	1,758	33.52%	5,244
Lincoln	2,025	55.19%	1,443	39.33%	124	3.38%	73	1.99%	4	0.11%	582	15.86%	3,669
Mason	553	56.60%	318	32.55%	80	8.19%	22	2.25%	4	0.41%	235	24.05%	977
Okanogan	1,368	49.23%	1,074	38.65%	307	11.05%	22	0.79%	8	0.29%	294	10.58%	2,779
Pacific	1,492	69.30%	483	22.43%	153	7.11%	21	0.98%	4	0.19%	1,009	46.86%	2,153
Pierce	10,935	60.84%	4,936	27.46%	1,626	9.05%	463	2.58%	14	0.08%	5,999	33.38%	17,974
San Juan	581	65.95%	178	20.20%	111	12.60%	10	1.14%	1	0.11%	403	45.74%	881
Skagit	2,924	56.42%	1,449	27.96%	690	13.31%	113	2.18%	7	0.14%	1,475	28.46%	5,183
Skamania	310	60.08%	143	27.71%	54	10.47%	7	1.36%	2	0.39%	167	32.36%	516
Snohomish	5,659	55.64%	2,974	29.24%	958	9.42%	567	5.57%	13	0.13%	2,685	26.40%	10,171
Spokane	11,719	58.68%	6,557	32.83%	1,184	5.93%	496	2.48%	14	0.07%	5,162	25.85%	19,970
Stevens	2,546	52.13%	1,564	32.02%	646	13.23%	120	2.46%	8	0.16%	982	20.11%	4,884
Thurston	1,940	57.28%	964	28.46%	367	10.84%	110	3.25%	6	0.18%	976	28.82%	3,387
Wahkiakum	485	70.80%	150	21.90%	46	6.72%	3	0.44%	1	0.15%	335	48.91%	685
Walla Walla	2,843	60.73%	1,660	35.46%	102	2.18%	71	1.52%	5	0.11%	1,183	25.27%	4,681
Whatcom	4,955	57.48%	2,398	27.82%	963	11.17%	296	3.43%	9	0.10%	2,557	29.66%	8,621
Whitman	3,376	52.60%	2,386	37.18%	337	5.25%	315	4.91%	4	0.06%	990	15.43%	6,418
Yakima	3,998	63.86%	1,650	26.35%	344	5.49%	258	4.12%	11	0.18%	2,348	37.50%	6,261
Totals	106,062	57.68%	58,691	31.92%	14,177	7.71%	4,700	2.56%	249	0.14%	43,371	25.76%	183,879

== See also ==
- United States presidential elections in Washington (state)
