= 1952 United States presidential election in Washington (state) =

- November 4, 1952

All 9 Washington votes to the Electoral College

Nominee	Dwight D. Eisenhower	Adlai Stevenson
Party	Republican	Democratic
Home state	New York	Illinois
Running mate	Richard Nixon	John Sparkman
Electoral vote	9	0
Popular vote	599,107	492,845
Percentage	54.33%	44.69%
County results
Eisenhower
40–50%
50–60%
60–70%
Stevenson
40–50%
50–60%
President before election
Harry S. Truman
Democratic
Elected President
Dwight D. Eisenhower
Republican

The 1952 United States presidential election in Washington took place on November 4, 1952, as part of the 1952 United States presidential election. Voters chose nine representatives, or electors, to the Electoral College, who voted for president and vice president.

Washington was won by Columbia University President Dwight D. Eisenhower (R–New York), running with California Senator Richard Nixon, with 54.33% of the popular vote, against Adlai Stevenson (D–Illinois), running with Alabama Senator John Sparkman, with 44.69% of the popular vote.

This was the last time a Republican won a majority of the vote in Pacific County.

== Results ==
1952 United States presidential election in Washington
Party	Candidate	Votes	%
Republican	Dwight D. Eisenhower	599,107	54.33%
Democratic	Adlai Stevenson	492,845	45.69%
Constitution	Douglas MacArthur	7,290	0.65%
Progressive	Vincent Hallinan	2,460	0.22%
Socialist Labor	Eric Hass	633	0.06%
Socialist	Darlington Hoopes	254	0.02%
Socialist Workers	Farrell Dobbs	119	0.01%
Total votes		1,102,708	100%

=== Results by county ===
County	Dwight D. Eisenhower Republican		Adlai Stevenson Democratic		Douglas MacArthur Constitution		Vincent Hallinan Progressive		Eric Hass Socialist Labor		Darlington Hoopes Socialist		Farrell Dobbs Socialist Workers		Margin		Total votes cast
County	#	%	#	%	#	%	#	%	#	%	#	%	#	%	#	%	Total votes cast
Adams	2,181	66.29%	1,104	33.56%	5	0.15%	0	0%	0	0%	0	0%	0	0%	1,077	32.73%	3,290
Asotin	2,722	55.62%	2,160	44.14%	10	0.20%	2	0.04%	0	0%	0	0%	0	0%	562	11.48%	4,894
Benton	13,412	57.40%	9,889	42.33%	54	0.23%	5	0.02%	3	0.01%	0	0%	1	0%	3,523	15.07%	23,364
Chelan	11,164	61.73%	6,867	37.97%	32	0.18%	12	0.07%	1	0.01%	5	0.03%	3	0.02%	4,297	23.76%	18,084
Clallam	6,442	53.96%	5,390	45.15%	37	0.31%	53	0.44%	10	0.08%	5	0.04%	1	0.01%	1,052	8.81%	11,938
Clark	18,973	50.83%	18,153	48.63%	118	0.32%	57	0.15%	16	0.04%	8	0.02%	3	0.01%	820	2.20%	37,328
Columbia	1,511	66.18%	765	33.51%	6	0.26%	1	0.04%	0	0%	0	0%	0	0%	746	32.67%	2,283
Cowlitz	12,366	52.08%	11,242	47.34%	79	0.33%	40	0.17%	9	0.04%	9	0.04%	1	0%	1,124	4.74%	23,746
Douglas	2,954	55.43%	2,361	44.30%	10	0.19%	2	0.04%	0	0.%	2	0.04%	0	0%	593	11.13%	5,329
Ferry	687	47.38%	754	52.00%	6	0.41%	3	0.21%	0	0%	0	0%	0	0%	-67	-4.62%	1,450
Franklin	3,291	53.89%	2,798	45.82%	13	0.21%	4	0.07%	1	0.02%	0	0%	0	0%	493	8.07%	6,107
Garfield	1,157	66.76%	559	32.26%	17	0.98%	0	0%	0	0%	0	0%	0	0%	598	34.50%	1,733
Grant	4,512	50.61%	4,381	49.14%	16	0.18%	5	0.06%	0	0%	0	0%	1	0.01%	131	1.47%	8,915
Grays Harbor	12,168	49.30%	12,317	49.90%	84	0.34%	62	0.25%	42	0.17%	9	0.04%	1	0%	-149	-0.60%	24,683
Island	2,901	61.68%	1,772	37.68%	22	0.47%	6	0.13%	2	0.04%	0	0%	0	0%	1,129	24.00%	4,703
Jefferson	2,355	54.70%	1,933	44.90%	6	0.14%	9	0.21%	0	0%	2	0.05%	0	0%	422	9.80%	4,305
King	200,507	53.93%	165,583	44.54%	4,130	1.11%	1,138	0.31%	238	0.06%	112	0.03%	63	0.02%	34,924	9.39%	371,771
Kitsap	16,876	44.89%	20,531	54.61%	122	0.32%	41	0.11%	16	0.04%	5	0.01%	5	0.01%	-3,655	-9.72%	37,596
Kittitas	5,201	56.69%	3,937	42.91%	27	0.29%	8	0.09%	1	0.01%	0	0%	0	0%	1,264	13.78%	9,174
Klickitat	2,845	56.78%	2,140	42.71%	15	0.30%	2	0.04%	8	0.16%	0	0%	1	0.02%	705	14.07%	5,011
Lewis	12,287	62.78%	7,115	36.35%	120	0.61%	36	0.18%	8	0.04%	5	0.03%	0	0%	5,172	26.43%	19,571
Lincoln	3,422	63.31%	1,974	36.52%	8	0.15%	1	0.02%	0	0%	0	0%	0	0%	1,448	26.79%	5,405
Mason	3,827	49.70%	3,830	49.74%	25	0.32%	14	0.18%	0	0%	3	0.04%	1	0.01%	-3	-0.04%	7,700
Okanogan	6,085	55.57%	4,817	43.99%	31	0.28%	12	0.11%	2	0.02%	3	0.03%	0	0%	1,268	11.58%	10,950
Pacific	3,846	50.19%	3,778	49.30%	19	0.25%	19	0.25%	9	0%	1	0.01%	0	0%	68	0.89%	7,663
Pend Oreille	1,566	52.87%	1,380	46.59%	10	0.34%	5	0.17%	1	0.03%	0	0%	0	0%	186	6.28%	2,962
Pierce	56,515	49.66%	56,132	49.32%	679	0.60%	316	0.28%	107	0.09%	44	0.04%	18	0.02%	383	0.34%	113,811
San Juan	1,133	64.16%	619	35.05%	3	0.17%	6	0.34%	2	0.11%	1	0.06%	2	0.11%	514	29.11%	1,766
Skagit	11,446	57.37%	8,321	41.71%	97	0.49%	73	0.37%	14	0.07%	1	0.01%	0	0%	3,125	15.66%	19,952
Skamania	1,072	52.29%	978	47.71%	0	0%	0	0%	0	0%	0	0%	0	0%	94	4.58%	2,050
Snohomish	26,749	47.94%	28,518	51.11%	246	0.44%	210	0.38%	59	0.11%	15	0.03%	4	0.01%	-1,769	-3.17%	55,801
Spokane	56,958	55.17%	45,827	44.39%	267	0.26%	110	0.11%	57	0.06%	11	0.01%	6	0.01%	11,131	10.78%	103,236
Stevens	4,458	56.54%	3,355	42.55%	50	0.63%	17	0.22%	4	0.05%	0	0%	1	0.01%	1,103	13.99%	7,885
Thurston	13,904	58.32%	9,764	40.96%	108	0.45%	57	0.24%	4	0.17%	1	0%	2	0.01%	4,140	17.36%	23,840
Wahkiakum	815	46.31%	928	52.73%	4	0.23%	5	0.28%	7	0.40%	1	0.06%	0	0%	-113	-6.42%	1,760
Walla Walla	11,987	67.28%	5,738	32.21%	84	0.47%	5	0.03%	2	0.01%	1	0.01%	0	0%	6,249	35.07%	17,817
Whatcom	17,590	57.06%	12,877	41.77%	256	0.83%	88	0.29%	12	0.04%	3	0.01%	2	0.01%	4,713	15.29%	30,828
Whitman	8,905	65.67%	4,611	34.00%	33	0.24%	7	0.05%	1	0.01%	2	0.01%	1	0.01%	4,294	31.67%	13,560
Yakima	32,317	64.06%	17,647	34.98%	441	0.87%	29	0.06%	6	0.01%	5	0.01%	2	0%	14,670	29.08%	50,447
Totals	599,107	54.33%	492,845	44.69%	7,290	0.66%	2,460	0.22%	633	0.06%	254	0.02%	119	0.01%	106,262	9.64%	1,102,708

==== Counties that flipped from Democratic to Republican ====
- Adams
- Benton
- Chelan
- Clallam
- Clark
- Cowlitz
- Douglas
- Franklin
- Grant
- Jefferson
- King
- Kittitas
- Klickitat
- Lincoln
- Okanogan
- Pacific
- Pend Oreille
- Pierce
- Skagit
- Skamania
- Spokane
- Stevens
- Thurston

== See also ==
- United States presidential elections in Washington (state)
