= 1944 United States presidential election in Washington (state) =

- November 7, 1944

All 8 Washington votes to the Electoral College

Nominee	Franklin D. Roosevelt	Thomas E. Dewey
Party	Democratic	Republican
Home state	New York	New York
Running mate	Harry S. Truman	John W. Bricker
Electoral vote	8	0
Popular vote	486,774	361,689
Percentage	56.84%	42.24%
County results
Roosevelt
40–50%
50–60%
60–70%
Dewey
50–60%
60–70%
President before election
Franklin D. Roosevelt
Democratic
Elected President
Franklin D. Roosevelt
Democratic

The 1944 United States presidential election in Washington took place on November 7, 1944, as part of the 1944 United States presidential election. Voters chose eight representatives, or electors, to the Electoral College, who voted for president and vice president.

Washington was won by incumbent President Franklin D. Roosevelt (D–New York), running with Missouri Senator Harry S. Truman, with 56.84% of the popular vote, against Governor Thomas E. Dewey (R–New York), running with Ohio Governor John Bricker, with 42.24% of the popular vote.

== Results ==
1944 United States presidential election in Washington
Party	Candidate	Votes	%
Democratic	Franklin D. Roosevelt (inc.)	486,774	56.84%
Republican	Thomas E. Dewey	361,689	42.24%
Socialist	Norman Thomas	3,824	0.45%
Prohibition	Claude A. Watson	2,396	0.28%
Socialist Labor	Edward A. Teichert	1,645	0.19%
Total votes		856,328	100%

=== Results by county ===
County	Franklin D. Roosevelt Democratic		Thomas E. Dewey Republican		Other candidates Various parties		Margin		Total votes cast
County	#	%	#	%	#	%	#	%	Total votes cast
Adams	1,062	38.76%	1,666	60.80%	12	0.44%	-604	-22.04%	2,740
Asotin	1,888	57.74%	1,367	41.80%	15	0.46%	521	15.93%	3,270
Benton	4,233	51.80%	3,905	47.79%	34	0.42%	328	4.01%	8,172
Chelan	6,557	47.82%	7,081	51.64%	75	0.55%	-524	-3.82%	13,713
Clallam	5,441	60.11%	3,551	39.23%	59	0.65%	1,890	20.88%	9,051
Clark	18,861	59.78%	12,312	39.03%	376	1.19%	6,549	20.76%	31,549
Columbia	1,039	45.77%	1,211	53.35%	20	0.88%	-172	-7.58%	2,270
Cowlitz	10,485	62.41%	6,157	36.65%	157	0.93%	4,328	25.76%	16,799
Douglas	1,832	49.99%	1,809	49.36%	24	0.65%	23	0.63%	3,665
Ferry	792	60.23%	518	39.39%	5	0.38%	274	20.84%	1,315
Franklin	1,974	58.56%	1,381	40.97%	16	0.47%	593	17.59%	3,371
Garfield	677	42.00%	925	57.38%	10	0.62%	-248	-15.38%	1,612
Grant	2,354	60.33%	1,530	39.21%	18	0.46%	824	21.12%	3,902
Grays Harbor	13,803	63.41%	7,834	35.99%	130	0.60%	5,969	27.42%	21,767
Island	1,662	52.15%	1,487	46.66%	38	1.19%	175	5.49%	3,187
Jefferson	1,829	56.07%	1,415	43.38%	18	0.55%	414	12.69%	3,262
King	165,308	57.68%	118,719	41.42%	2,577	0.90%	46,589	16.26%	286,604
Kitsap	24,016	67.67%	11,224	31.62%	251	0.71%	12,792	36.04%	35,491
Kittitas	4,227	55.00%	3,423	44.54%	36	0.47%	804	10.46%	7,686
Klickitat	2,089	50.62%	1,980	47.98%	58	1.41%	109	2.64%	4,127
Lewis	7,706	46.07%	8,896	53.19%	124	0.74%	-1,190	-7.11%	16,726
Lincoln	2,328	45.95%	2,723	53.75%	15	0.30%	-395	-7.80%	5,066
Mason	3,379	62.61%	1,976	36.61%	42	0.78%	1,403	26.00%	5,397
Okanogan	4,642	52.97%	4,084	46.60%	38	0.43%	558	6.37%	8,764
Pacific	3,745	60.64%	2,419	39.17%	12	0.19%	1,326	21.47%	6,176
Pend Oreille	1,385	56.48%	1,052	42.90%	15	0.61%	333	13.58%	2,452
Pierce	53,269	61.68%	31,626	36.62%	1,475	1.71%	21,643	25.06%	86,370
San Juan	644	47.56%	703	51.92%	7	0.52%	-59	-4.36%	1,354
Skagit	9,409	54.29%	7,805	45.03%	118	0.68%	1,604	9.25%	17,332
Skamania	968	58.77%	668	40.56%	11	0.67%	300	18.21%	1,647
Snohomish	27,345	63.40%	15,182	35.20%	603	1.40%	12,163	28.20%	43,130
Spokane	45,491	55.27%	36,359	44.18%	456	0.55%	9,132	11.10%	82,306
Stevens	3,951	55.14%	3,151	43.98%	63	0.88%	800	11.17%	7,165
Thurston	9,708	54.64%	7,900	44.47%	158	0.89%	1,808	10.18%	17,766
Wahkiakum	1,003	64.92%	532	34.43%	10	0.65%	471	30.49%	1,545
Walla Walla	5,793	43.77%	7,364	55.64%	78	0.59%	-1,571	-11.87%	13,235
Whatcom	14,787	52.63%	12,890	45.88%	421	1.50%	1,897	6.75%	28,098
Whitman	5,449	47.42%	6,000	52.22%	41	0.36%	-551	-4.80%	11,490
Yakima	15,643	42.56%	20,864	56.76%	249	0.68%	-5,221	-14.20%	36,756
Totals	486,774	56.84%	361,689	42.24%	7,865	0.92%	125,085	14.61%	856,328

==== Counties that flipped from Republican to Democratic ====
- Benton

==== Counties that flipped from Democratic to Republican ====
- Lewis
- Lincoln
- San Juan

== See also ==
- United States presidential elections in Washington (state)
