= 1948 United States presidential election in Washington (state) =

- November 2, 1948

All 8 Washington votes to the Electoral College

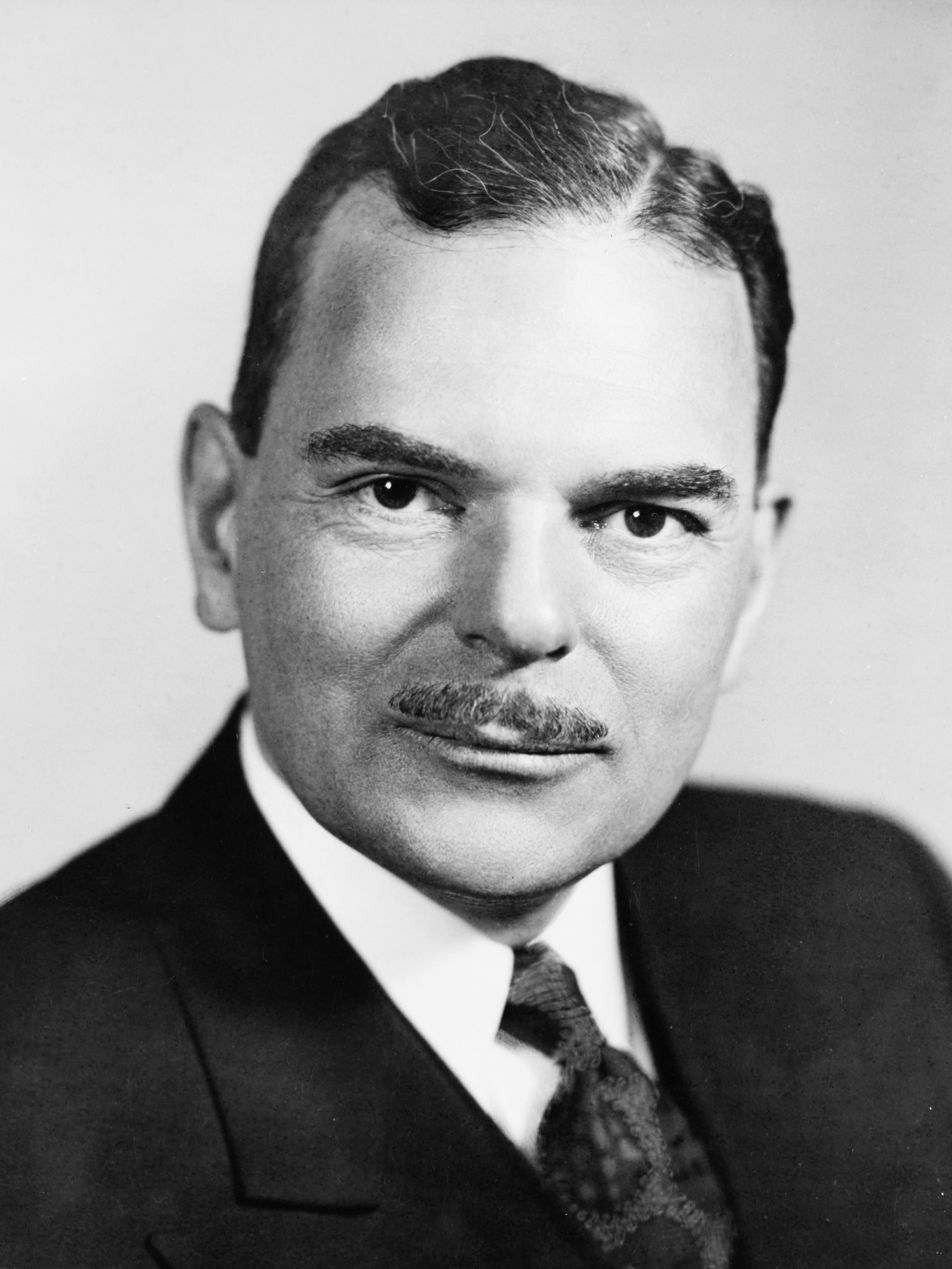
Nominee	Harry S. Truman	Thomas E. Dewey
Party	Democratic	Republican
Home state	Missouri	New York
Running mate	Alben W. Barkley	Earl Warren
Electoral vote	8	0
Popular vote	475,165	386,315
Percentage	52.56%	42.73%
County results
Truman
40–50%
50–60%
60–70%
Dewey
40–50%
50–60%
President before election
Harry S. Truman
Democratic
Elected President
Harry S. Truman
Democratic

The 1948 United States presidential election in Washington took place on November 2, 1948, as part of the 1948 United States presidential election. Voters chose eight representatives, or electors, to the Electoral College, who voted for president and vice president.

Washington was won by incumbent President Harry S. Truman (D–Missouri), running with Kentucky Senator Alben W. Barkley, with 52.61 percent of the popular vote, against Governor Thomas E. Dewey (R–New York), running with California Governor Earl Warren, with 42.68 percent of the popular vote.

As of the 2024 presidential election, this is the last occasion Lincoln County has voted for a Democratic presidential candidate.

== Results ==
1948 United States presidential election in Washington
Party	Candidate	Votes	%
Democratic	Harry S. Truman (inc.)	475,165	52.56%
Republican	Thomas E. Dewey	386,315	42.73%
Progressive	Henry A. Wallace	31,692	3.51%
Prohibition	Claude A. Watson	6,117	0.68%
Socialist	Norman Thomas	3,534	0.39%
Socialist Labor	Edward A. Teichert	1,133	0.13%
Socialist Workers	Farrell Dobbs	103	0.01%
Total votes		904,059	100%

=== Results by county ===
County	Harry S. Truman Democratic		Thomas E. Dewey Republican		Henry A. Wallace Progressive		Claude A. Watson Prohibition		Norman M. Thomas Socialist		Edward A. Teichert Socialist Labor		Farrell Dobbs Socialist Workers		Margin		Total votes cast
County	#	%	#	%	#	%	#	%	#	%	#	%	#	%	#	%	Total votes cast
Adams	1,267	47.22%	1,394	51.96%	14	0.52%	2	0.07%	6	0.22%	0	0%	0	0%	-127	-4.73%	2,683
Asotin	2,054	57.33%	1,384	38.63%	117	3.27%	22	0.61%	6	0.17%	0	0%	0	0%	670	18.70%	3,583
Benton	8,458	58.46%	5,852	40.45%	116	0.80%	13	0.09%	28	0.19%	0	0%	0	0%	2,606	18.01%	14,467
Chelan	7,702	50.17%	7,392	48.15%	147	0.96%	81	0.53%	28	0.18%	1	0.01%	0	0%	310	2.02%	15,351
Clallam	5,412	53.60%	4,178	41.38%	456	4.52%	25	0.25%	22	0.22%	3	0.03%	1	0.01%	1,234	12.22%	10,097
Clark	17,154	56.93%	11,546	38.32%	1,041	3.45%	225	0.75%	141	0.47%	22	0.07%	3	0.01%	5,608	18.61%	30,132
Columbia	1,015	48.06%	1,062	50.28%	25	1.18%	9	0.43%	1	0.05%	0	0%	0	0%	-47	-2.23%	2,112
Cowlitz	11,075	58.59%	7,098	37.55%	625	3.31%	31	0.16%	62	0.33%	11	0.06%	0	0%	3,977	21.04%	18,902
Douglas	2,251	55.81%	1,703	42.23%	32	0.79%	30	0.74%	15	0.37%	1	0.02%	1	0.02%	548	13.59%	4,033
Ferry	824	61.49%	473	35.30%	38	2.84%	0	0%	5	0.37%	0	0%	0	0%	351	26.19%	1,340
Franklin	2,525	61.14%	1,541	37.31%	46	1.11%	10	0.24%	8	0.19%	0	0%	0	0%	984	23.83%	4,130
Garfield	747	48.79%	749	48.92%	6	0.39%	27	1.76%	2	0.13%	0	0%	0	0%	-2	-0.13%	1,531
Grant	4,067	64.79%	2,081	33.15%	107	1.70%	9	0.14%	12	0.19%	1	0.02%	0	0%	1,986	31.64%	6,277
Grays Harbor	13,660	58.84%	8,357	36.00%	1,034	4.45%	67	0.29%	51	0.22%	44	0.19%	2	0.01%	5,303	22.84%	23,215
Island	1,694	46.03%	1,805	49.05%	148	4.02%	15	0.41%	18	0.49%	0	0%	0	0%	-111	-3.02%	3,680
Jefferson	1,911	51.99%	1,610	43.80%	129	3.51%	5	0.14%	20	0.54%	1	0.03%	0	0%	301	8.19%	3,676
King	143,295	49.14%	131,039	44.93%	11,857	4.07%	3,182	1.09%	1,554	0.53%	652	0.22%	56	0.02%	12,256	4.20%	291,635
Kitsap	19,538	63.69%	9,869	32.17%	1,077	3.51%	86	0.28%	98	0.32%	9	0.03%	1	0%	9,669	31.52%	30,678
Kittitas	4,588	54.96%	3,446	41.28%	272	3.26%	12	0.14%	29	0.35%	1	0.01%	0	0%	1,142	13.68%	8,348
Klickitat	2,206	51.88%	1,951	45.88%	58	1.36%	9	0.21%	16	0.38%	12	0.28%	0	0%	255	6.00%	4,252
Lewis	8,394	46.76%	9,047	50.39%	415	2.31%	48	0.27%	46	0.26%	2	0.01%	1	0.01%	-653	-3.64%	17,953
Lincoln	2,518	51.14%	2,348	47.68%	48	0.97%	3	0.06%	4	0.08%	2	0.04%	1	0.02%	170	3.45%	4,924
Mason	3,613	55.58%	2,524	38.82%	333	5.12%	8	0.12%	21	0.32%	2	0.03%	0	0%	1,089	16.75%	6,501
Okanogan	5,644	56.81%	4,083	41.10%	150	1.51%	35	0.35%	22	0.22%	1	0.01%	0	0%	1,561	15.71%	9,935
Pacific	3,902	55.33%	2,749	38.98%	360	5.1%	7	0.1%	28	0.4%	5	0.19%	1	0.01%	1,153	16.35%	7,052
Pend Oreille	1,465	57.07%	1,009	39.31%	80	3.12%	7	0.27%	5	0.19%	1	0.04%	0	0%	456	17.76%	2,567
Pierce	50,674	55.82%	34,396	37.89%	4,355	4.80%	761	0.84%	417	0.46%	163	0.18%	20	0.02%	16,278	17.93%	90,786
San Juan	636	40.38%	881	55.94%	51	3.24%	2	0.13%	5	0.32%	0	0%	0	0%	-245	-15.56%	1,575
Skagit	9,080	49.91%	8,176	44.94%	782	4.30%	103	0.57%	41	0.23%	10	0.05%	0	0%	904	4.97%	18,192
Skamania	1,067	57.93%	707	38.38%	52	2.82%	7	0.38%	9	0.49%	0	0%	0	0%	360	19.54%	1,842
Snohomish	25,924	56.04%	17,018	36.79%	2,737	5.92%	308	0.67%	190	0.41%	79	0.17%	4	0.01%	8,906	19.25%	46,260
Spokane	49,649	55.79%	37,086	41.68%	1,778	2.00%	169	0.19%	255	0.29%	45	0.05%	6	0.01%	12,563	14.12%	88,988
Stevens	4,205	56.56%	2,977	40.05%	218	2.93%	20	0.27%	12	0.16%	2	0.03%	0	0%	1,228	16.52%	7,434
Thurston	10,461	50.28%	9,511	45.72%	700	3.36%	66	0.32%	61	0.29%	5	0.02%	0	0%	950	4.57%	20,804
Wahkiakum	877	54.92%	622	38.95%	80	5.01%	6	0.38%	2	0.13%	10	0.63%	0	0%	255	15.97%	1,597
Walla Walla	7,102	46.18%	7,993	51.98%	126	0.82%	110	0.72%	45	0.29%	2	0.01%	0	0%	-891	-5.79%	15,378
Whatcom	12,736	46.40%	12,850	46.81%	1,383	4.86%	337	1.23%	107	0.39%	36	0.13%	2	0.01%	-114	-0.41%	27,451
Whitman	6,015	47.21%	6,411	50.32%	209	1.64%	43	0.34%	59	0.46%	3	0.02%	0	0%	-396	-3.11%	12,740
Yakima	19,760	47.10%	21,396	51.00%	490	1.17%	217	0.52%	83	0.2%	7	0.02%	4	0.01%	-1,636	-3.90%	41,957
Totals	475,165	52.56%	386,315 (Note: Dewey's county by figures add up to 386,314)	42.73%	31,692	3.51%	6,117	0.68%	3,534	0.39%	1,133	0.13%	103	0.01%	88,851	9.83%	904,059

==== Counties that flipped from Republican to Democratic ====
- Chelan
- Lincoln

==== Counties that flipped from Democratic to Republican ====
- Island
- Whatcom

== See also ==
- United States presidential elections in Washington (state)
