= 1972 United States presidential election in Washington (state) =

- November 7, 1972

Nominee	Richard Nixon	George McGovern
Party	Republican	Democratic
Home state	California	South Dakota
Running mate	Spiro Agnew	Sargent Shriver
Electoral vote	9	0
Popular vote	837,135	568,334
Percentage	56.92%	38.64%
County results
Nixon
40–50%
50–60%
60–70%
McGovern
40–50%
50–60%
President before election
Richard Nixon
Republican
Elected President
Richard Nixon
Republican

The 1972 United States presidential election in Washington took place on November 7, 1972, as part of the 1972 United States presidential election. State voters chose nine representatives, or electors, to the Electoral College, who voted for president and vice president.

Washington voted for the Republican incumbent, Richard Nixon, over the Democratic challenger, South Dakota Senator George McGovern. Nixon took 56.92% of the vote to McGovern's 38.64%, a margin of 18.28%, which still made the state 4.87% more Democratic than the nation at-large.

Nixon won every county except heavily unionized Grays Harbor and Pacific Counties, in the process being the first Republican to carry Wahkiakum County (another heavily unionized timber county), Kitsap County and Snohomish County since Herbert Hoover in 1928.

Nixon's victory was the first of four consecutive Republican presidential victories in the state, as Washington would not vote for a Democratic candidate again until Michael Dukakis in 1988, after which the state has always gone Democratic.

== Results ==
1972 United States presidential election in Washington
Party	Candidate	Votes	Percentage	Electoral votes
Republican	Richard Nixon (incumbent)	837,135	56.92%	9
Democratic	George McGovern	568,334	38.64%	0
American Independent	John G. Schmitz	58,906	4.00%	0
Independent	Benjamin Spock	2,644	0.18%	0
Libertarian	John Hospers	1,537	0.10%	0
Socialist Labor	Louis Fisher	1,102	0.07%	0
Socialist Workers	Linda Jenness	623	0.04%	0
Communist	Gus Hall	566	0.04%	0
Totals		1,470,847	100.00%	9
Voter turnout				—

=== Results by county ===
County	Richard Nixon Republican		George McGovern Democratic		John G. Schmitz American Independent		Various candidates Other parties		Margin		Total votes cast
County	#	%	#	%	#	%	#	%	#	%	Total votes cast
Adams	3,083	68.22%	1,110	24.56%	316	6.99%	10	0.22%	1,973	43.66%	4,519
Asotin	2,911	50.36%	2,559	44.27%	301	5.21%	9	0.16%	352	6.09%	5,780
Benton	18,517	61.02%	9,824	32.37%	1,911	6.30%	94	0.31%	8,693	28.65%	30,346
Chelan	10,470	60.13%	5,889	33.82%	971	5.58%	83	0.48%	4,581	26.31%	17,413
Clallam	9,372	58.25%	5,620	34.93%	1,056	6.56%	41	0.25%	3,752	23.32%	16,089
Clark	28,775	49.13%	27,179	46.41%	2,416	4.13%	199	0.34%	1,596	2.72%	58,569
Columbia	1,445	69.47%	533	25.63%	102	4.90%	0	0.00%	912	43.84%	2,080
Cowlitz	14,431	51.21%	12,682	45.00%	959	3.40%	110	0.39%	1,749	6.21%	28,182
Douglas	4,512	60.31%	2,420	32.35%	538	7.19%	11	0.15%	2,092	27.96%	7,481
Ferry	815	53.37%	560	36.67%	145	9.50%	7	0.46%	255	16.70%	1,527
Franklin	5,972	56.75%	3,867	36.75%	655	6.22%	29	0.28%	2,105	20.00%	10,523
Garfield	1,004	65.45%	481	31.36%	46	3.00%	3	0.20%	523	34.09%	1,534
Grant	9,370	59.25%	5,487	34.70%	908	5.74%	49	0.31%	3,883	24.55%	15,814
Grays Harbor	10,839	45.65%	11,786	49.64%	1,000	4.21%	120	0.51%	-947	-3.99%	23,745
Island	7,495	68.12%	3,149	28.62%	316	2.87%	43	0.39%	4,346	39.50%	11,003
Jefferson	2,770	53.49%	2,096	40.47%	277	5.35%	36	0.70%	674	13.02%	5,179
King	298,707	56.39%	212,509	40.12%	15,624	2.95%	2,854	0.54%	86,198	16.27%	529,694
Kitsap	25,831	56.84%	17,011	37.43%	2,429	5.34%	175	0.39%	8,820	19.41%	45,446
Kittitas	5,464	53.96%	4,299	42.46%	327	3.23%	36	0.36%	1,165	11.50%	10,126
Klickitat	3,061	54.20%	2,293	40.60%	276	4.89%	18	0.32%	768	13.60%	5,648
Lewis	12,071	58.64%	6,946	33.74%	1,520	7.38%	48	0.23%	5,125	24.90%	20,585
Lincoln	3,647	69.14%	1,453	27.55%	161	3.05%	14	0.27%	2,194	41.59%	5,275
Mason	4,873	53.10%	3,907	42.57%	363	3.96%	34	0.37%	966	10.53%	9,177
Okanogan	5,796	56.09%	3,835	37.11%	655	6.34%	48	0.46%	1,961	18.98%	10,334
Pacific	3,349	46.73%	3,585	50.03%	204	2.85%	28	0.39%	-236	-3.30%	7,166
Pend Oreille	1,746	59.57%	1,071	36.54%	104	3.55%	10	0.34%	675	23.03%	2,931
Pierce	84,265	56.91%	56,933	38.45%	6,189	4.18%	678	0.46%	27,332	18.46%	148,065
San Juan	1,786	63.90%	906	32.42%	86	3.08%	17	0.61%	880	31.48%	2,795
Skagit	14,212	58.13%	9,233	37.77%	911	3.73%	92	0.38%	4,979	20.36%	24,448
Skamania	1,288	48.70%	1,153	43.59%	189	7.15%	15	0.57%	135	5.11%	2,645
Snohomish	60,032	57.27%	39,471	37.66%	4,803	4.58%	515	0.49%	20,561	19.61%	104,821
Spokane	74,320	59.37%	44,337	35.42%	6,129	4.90%	399	0.32%	29,983	23.95%	125,185
Stevens	4,839	61.26%	2,390	30.26%	647	8.19%	23	0.29%	2,449	31.00%	7,899
Thurston	22,297	57.48%	14,596	37.63%	1,722	4.44%	177	0.46%	7,701	19.85%	38,792
Wahkiakum	818	47.39%	796	46.12%	108	6.26%	4	0.23%	22	1.27%	1,726
Walla Walla	12,579	67.87%	5,364	28.94%	515	2.78%	75	0.40%	7,215	38.93%	18,533
Whatcom	22,585	58.21%	15,027	38.73%	1,031	2.66%	158	0.41%	7,558	19.48%	38,801
Whitman	9,548	58.70%	6,248	38.41%	398	2.45%	72	0.44%	3,300	20.29%	16,266
Yakima	32,240	58.93%	19,729	36.06%	2,598	4.75%	138	0.25%	12,511	22.87%	54,705
Totals	837,135	56.92%	568,334	38.64%	58,906	4.00%	6,472	0.44%	268,801	18.28%	1,470,847

== See also ==
- United States presidential elections in Washington (state)
