= 1912 United States presidential election in Washington (state) =

- November 5, 1912
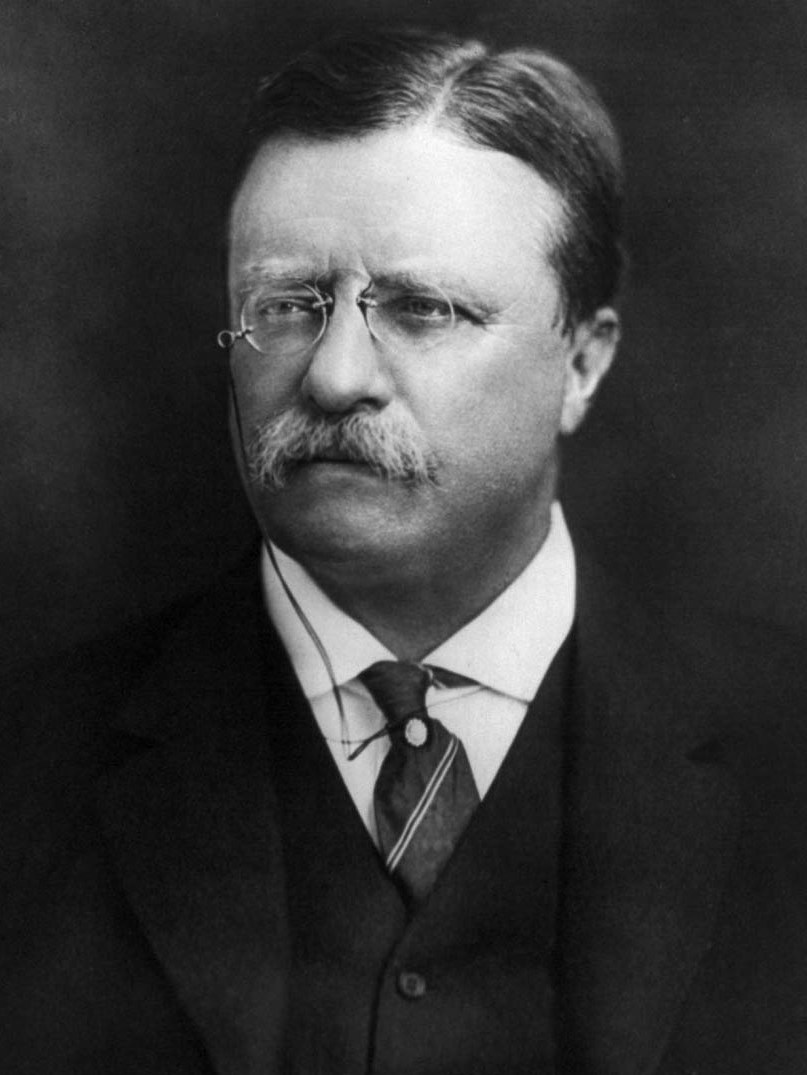

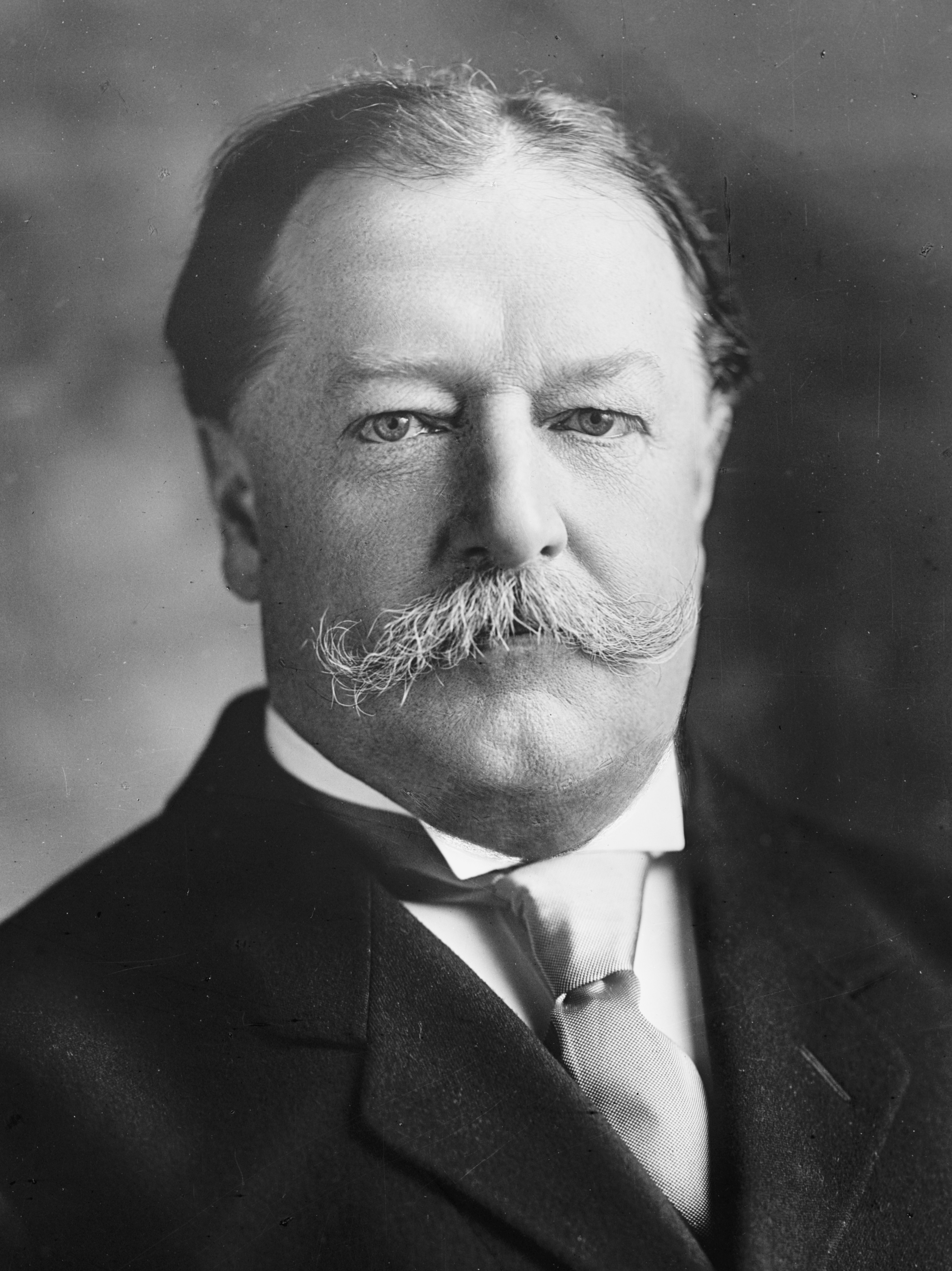

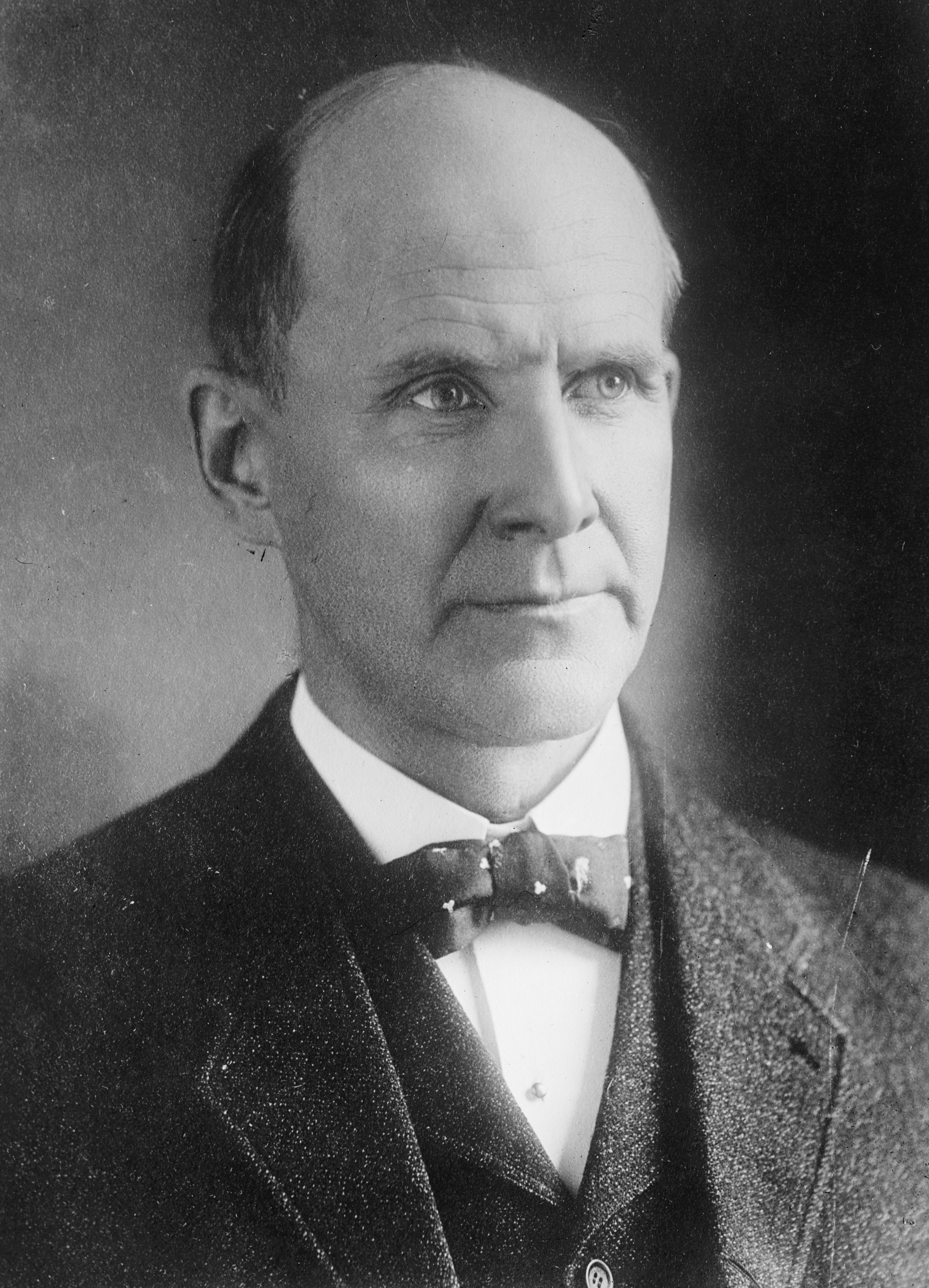
Nominee	Theodore Roosevelt	Woodrow Wilson
Party	Progressive	Democratic
Home state	New York	New Jersey
Running mate	Hiram Johnson	Thomas R. Marshall
Electoral vote	7	0
Popular vote	113,698	86,840
Percentage	35.22%	26.90%
Nominee	William Howard Taft	Eugene V. Debs
Party	Republican	Socialist
Home state	Ohio	Indiana
Running mate	Nicholas Murray Butler	Emil Seidel
Electoral vote	0	0
Popular vote	70,445	40,134
Percentage	21.82%	12.43%
County results
Roosevelt
20–30%
30–40%
40–50%
Wilson
20–30%
30–40%
40–50%
Taft
20–30%
30–40%
President before election
William Howard Taft
Republican
Elected President
Woodrow Wilson
Democratic

The 1912 United States presidential election in Washington took place on November 5, 1912, as part of the 1912 United States presidential election. Voters chose seven representatives, or electors, to the Electoral College, who voted for president and vice president.

Washington was won by the 26th president of the United States Theodore Roosevelt (P–New York), running with governor of California Hiram Johnson, with 35.22% of the popular vote against the Princeton University President Woodrow Wilson (D–New Jersey), running with governor of Indiana Thomas R. Marshall, with 26.90% of the popular vote, the 27th president of the United States William Howard Taft (R–Ohio), running with Columbia University President Nicholas Murray Butler, with 21.82% of the popular vote and the five-time candidate of the Socialist Party of America for President of the United States Eugene V. Debs (S–Indiana), running with the first Socialist mayor of a major city in the United States Emil Seidel, with 12.43% of the popular vote.

As a result of his win as a Progressive, Roosevelt became the first and only third party candidate to win the State of Washington. It is the only time ever that neighboring Oregon voted Democratic and Washington did not.

This was the first election in Washington in which women had the right to vote. In 1910, the voters of Washington passed a constitutional amendment which granted full suffrage to women.

== Results ==
General Election Results
Party	Pledged to	Elector	Votes
Progressive Party	Theodore Roosevelt	Helen J. Scott	113,698
Progressive Party	Theodore Roosevelt	George H. Walker	113,533
Progressive Party	Theodore Roosevelt	Austin Mires	113,474
Progressive Party	Theodore Roosevelt	G. Alfred Haynes	113,440
Progressive Party	Theodore Roosevelt	William J. Biggar	113,423
Progressive Party	Theodore Roosevelt	Fred J. Meinike	113,401
Progressive Party	Theodore Roosevelt	Donald Urquhart	113,336
Democratic Party	Woodrow Wilson	Edward P. English	86,840
Democratic Party	Woodrow Wilson	Edward F. Hogan	86,644
Democratic Party	Woodrow Wilson	J. D. Matthews	86,640
Democratic Party	Woodrow Wilson	Ande P. Anderson	86,592
Democratic Party	Woodrow Wilson	William E. Cass	86,577
Democratic Party	Woodrow Wilson	Robert E. Tumstall	86,536
Democratic Party	Woodrow Wilson	Robert A. Mullenger	86,442
Republican Party	William Howard Taft	George H. Rummens	70,445
Republican Party	William Howard Taft	William Joseph Smith	70,278
Republican Party	William Howard Taft	Nathan O. Richards	70,228
Republican Party	William Howard Taft	William George Potts	70,193
Republican Party	William Howard Taft	William Bishop	70,190
Republican Party	William Howard Taft	Alexander Polson	70,118
Republican Party	William Howard Taft	John A. Byerly	70,066
Socialist Party	Eugene V. Debs	Ernest Luhr	40,134
Socialist Party	Eugene V. Debs	Agnes J. Tompson	40,101
Socialist Party	Eugene V. Debs	Minnie Davis	40,073
Socialist Party	Eugene V. Debs	I. P. Buck	40,034
Socialist Party	Eugene V. Debs	J. C. Robbins	40,030
Socialist Party	Eugene V. Debs	H. W. Sauser	40,010
Socialist Party	Eugene V. Debs	Hortense Wagenknecht	39,989
Prohibition Party	Eugene W. Chafin	John Anderson	9,810
Prohibition Party	Eugene W. Chafin	JN. U. Blackmore	9,760
Prohibition Party	Eugene W. Chafin	Walter F. McDowell	9,753
Prohibition Party	Eugene W. Chafin	H. J. Probstfeld	9,750
Prohibition Party	Eugene W. Chafin	J. V. Mohr	9,749
Prohibition Party	Eugene W. Chafin	W. A. Moore	9,743
Prohibition Party	Eugene W. Chafin	J. N. Emerson	9,736
Socialist Labor Party	Arthur E. Reimer	James M. Carnahan	1,872
Socialist Labor Party	Arthur E. Reimer	Andrew P. Anderson	1,851
Socialist Labor Party	Arthur E. Reimer	Jerry E. Sullivan	1,842
Socialist Labor Party	Arthur E. Reimer	James C. Anderson	1,834
Socialist Labor Party	Arthur E. Reimer	W. Edward Clemont	1,833
Socialist Labor Party	Arthur E. Reimer	Frederick Kurtzman	1,832
Socialist Labor Party	Arthur E. Reimer	Gustav Rush	1,823
Votes cast (Note: Based on totals for highest elector on each ticket)			322,799

=== Results by county ===
County	Theodore Roosevelt Progressive "Bull Moose"		Woodrow Wilson Democratic		William Howard Taft Republican		Eugene V. Debs Socialist		Eugene W. Chafin Prohibition		Arthur E. Reimer Socialist Labor		Margin		Total votes cast (Note: Based on highest elector on each ticket)
County	#	%	#	%	#	%	#	%	#	%	#	%	#	%	Total votes cast
Adams	788	33.70%	949	40.59%	398	17.02%	155	6.63%	42	1.80%	6	0.26%	-161	-6.89%	2,338
Asotin	513	27.80%	551	29.86%	579	31.38%	133	7.21%	66	3.58%	3	0.16%	-28 (Note: Taft's margin over Wilson)	-1.52%	1,845
Benton	1,373	36.05%	1,238	32.50%	728	19.11%	356	9.35%	78	2.05%	36	0.95%	135	3.54%	3,809
Chehalis	1,847	20.96%	1,953	22.16%	3,055	34.66%	1,683	19.09%	228	2.59%	48	0.54%	-1,102	-12.50%	8,814
Chelan	1,994	38.72%	1,331	25.84%	970	18.83%	623	12.10%	204	3.96%	28	0.54%	663	12.87%	5,150
Clallam	686	27.05%	464	18.30%	727	28.67%	610	24.05%	36	1.42%	13	0.51%	-41 (Note: Taft's margin over Roosevelt)	-1.62%	2,536
Clarke	2,082	25.99%	2,549	31.82%	1,872	23.37%	966	12.06%	513	6.40%	28	0.35%	-467	-5.83%	8,010
Columbia	803	31.32%	855	33.35%	673	26.25%	172	6.71%	59	2.30%	2	0.08%	-52	-2.03%	2,564
Cowlitz	1,006	25.87%	919	23.63%	1,348	34.66%	527	13.55%	79	2.03%	10	0.26%	-342	-8.79%	3,889
Douglas	794	24.93%	1,357	42.61%	642	20.16%	316	9.92%	65	2.04%	11	0.35%	-563	-17.68%	3,185
Ferry	502	29.74%	609	36.08%	286	16.94%	269	15.94%	13	0.77%	9	0.53%	-107	-6.34%	1,688
Franklin	525	29.41%	612	34.29%	293	16.41%	302	16.92%	38	2.13%	15	0.84%	-87	-4.87%	1,785
Garfield	667	42.84%	426	27.36%	345	22.16%	86	5.52%	32	2.06%	1	0.06%	241	15.48%	1,557
Grant	914	34.75%	771	29.32%	458	17.41%	414	15.74%	62	2.36%	11	0.42%	143	5.44%	2,630
Island	503	31.98%	310	19.71%	332	21.11%	347	22.06%	80	5.09%	1	0.06%	156 (Note: Roosevelt's margin over Debs)	9.92%	1,573
Jefferson	741	31.86%	642	27.60%	636	27.34%	285	12.25%	11	0.47%	11	0.47%	99	4.26%	2,326
King	26,887	37.70%	20,088	28.17%	15,579	21.85%	6,839	9.59%	1,251	1.75%	665	0.93%	6,799	9.53%	71,309
Kitsap	2,321	38.16%	969	15.93%	1,224	20.12%	1,429	23.50%	101	1.66%	38	0.62%	892	14.67%	6,082
Kittitas	1,902	36.89%	1,407	27.29%	1,157	22.44%	515	9.99%	142	2.75%	33	0.64%	495	9.60%	5,156
Klickitat	795	22.98%	1,028	29.72%	1,163	33.62%	351	10.15%	107	3.09%	15	0.43%	-135	-3.90%	3,459
Lewis	2,032	20.76%	2,471	25.25%	3,200	32.70%	1,637	16.73%	410	4.19%	36	0.37%	-729	-7.45%	9,786
Lincoln	1,864	39.00%	1,829	38.26%	691	14.46%	293	6.13%	88	1.84%	15	0.31%	35	0.73%	4,780
Mason	464	25.81%	522	29.03%	439	24.42%	339	18.85%	22	1.22%	12	0.67%	-58	-3.23%	1,798
Okanogan	1,088	25.67%	1,461	34.47%	804	18.97%	827	19.51%	38	0.90%	21	0.50%	-373	-8.80%	4,239
Pacific	1,251	30.72%	971	23.85%	1,375	33.77%	382	9.38%	82	2.01%	11	0.27%	-124	-3.05%	4,072
Pend Oreille	716	34.19%	747	35.67%	305	14.57%	288	13.75%	32	1.53%	6	0.29%	-31	-1.48%	2,094
Pierce	13,074	41.30%	6,855	21.65%	6,517	20.59%	4,075	12.87%	964	3.05%	172	0.54%	6,219	19.64%	31,657
San Juan	346	27.93%	311	25.10%	341	27.52%	217	17.51%	18	1.45%	6	0.48%	5 (Note: Roosevelt's margin over Taft)	0.40%	1,239
Skagit	2,529	27.38%	1,962	21.24%	2,399	25.97%	1,781	19.28%	508	5.50%	58	0.63%	130	1.41%	9,237
Skamania	218	26.27%	262	31.57%	251	30.24%	86	10.36%	10	1.20%	3	0.36%	-11 (Note: Wilson's margin over Taft)	-1.33%	830
Snohomish	7,347	38.30%	3,846	20.05%	3,007	15.68%	3,969	20.69%	896	4.67%	117	0.61%	3,378	17.61%	19,182
Spokane	16,687	47.31%	10,845	30.75%	4,205	11.92%	2,553	7.24%	779	2.21%	199	0.56%	5,842	16.56%	35,268
Stevens	1,971	32.84%	1,979	32.98%	810	13.50%	988	16.46%	227	3.78%	26	0.43%	-8	-0.13%	6,001
Thurston	1,471	23.31%	1,456	23.07%	1,937	30.69%	1,160	18.38%	270	4.28%	17	0.27%	-466	-7.38%	6,311
Wahkiakum	287	32.47%	185	20.93%	282	31.90%	111	12.56%	14	1.58%	5	0.57%	5	0.57%	884
Walla Walla	2,727	35.59%	2,507	32.72%	1,937	25.28%	346	4.52%	125	1.63%	21	0.27%	220	2.87%	7,663
Whatcom	4,562	30.40%	2,773	18.48%	4,187	27.90%	2,809	18.72%	573	3.82%	101	0.67%	375	2.50%	15,005
Whitman	3,061	30.79%	3,621	36.42%	1,989	20.00%	631	6.35%	617	6.21%	24	0.24%	-560	-5.63%	9,943
Yakima	4,360	33.27%	3,209	24.49%	3,304	25.21%	1,264	9.65%	930	7.10%	38	0.29%	1,056	8.06%	13,105
Totals	113,698	35.22%	86,840	26.90%	70,445	21.82%	40,134	12.43%	9,810	3.04%	1,872	0.58%	26,858	8.32%	322,799

==== Counties that flipped from Republican to Progressive ====
- Benton
- Chelan
- Garfield
- Island
- Jefferson
- King
- Kitsap
- Kittitas
- Lincoln
- Pierce
- San Juan
- Skagit
- Snohomish
- Spokane
- Wahkiakum
- Walla Walla
- Whatcom
- Yakima

==== Counties that flipped from Republican to Democratic ====
- Adams
- Clark
- Columbia
- Douglas
- Ferry
- Franklin
- Mason
- Okanogan
- Skamania
- Stevens
- Whitman

== See also ==
- United States presidential elections in Washington (state)
