= Liberty Party (United States, 1932) =

- Founded: 1932
- Dissolved: 1932
- Succeeded by: Jobless Party
- International affiliation: None

The Liberty Party was a minor political party in the United States in the 1930s, based on the economic theories of W.H. "Coin" Harvey (1851–1936) (found mainly in his book, The Book). Harvey was initially its 1932 presidential candidate, and they held their convention at his resort, Monte Ne, near Rogers, Arkansas.

However, the Liberty Party ended up merging with the Jobless Party, and Harvey ran for president as an independent. He came in fifth, receiving about 53,000 votes, the majority of which (over 30,000) came from the state of Washington, where he polled 4.9% of the overall vote.

== See also ==
- Liberty Party (United States, 1840)
