= 1900 United States presidential election in Washington (state) =

- November 6, 1900
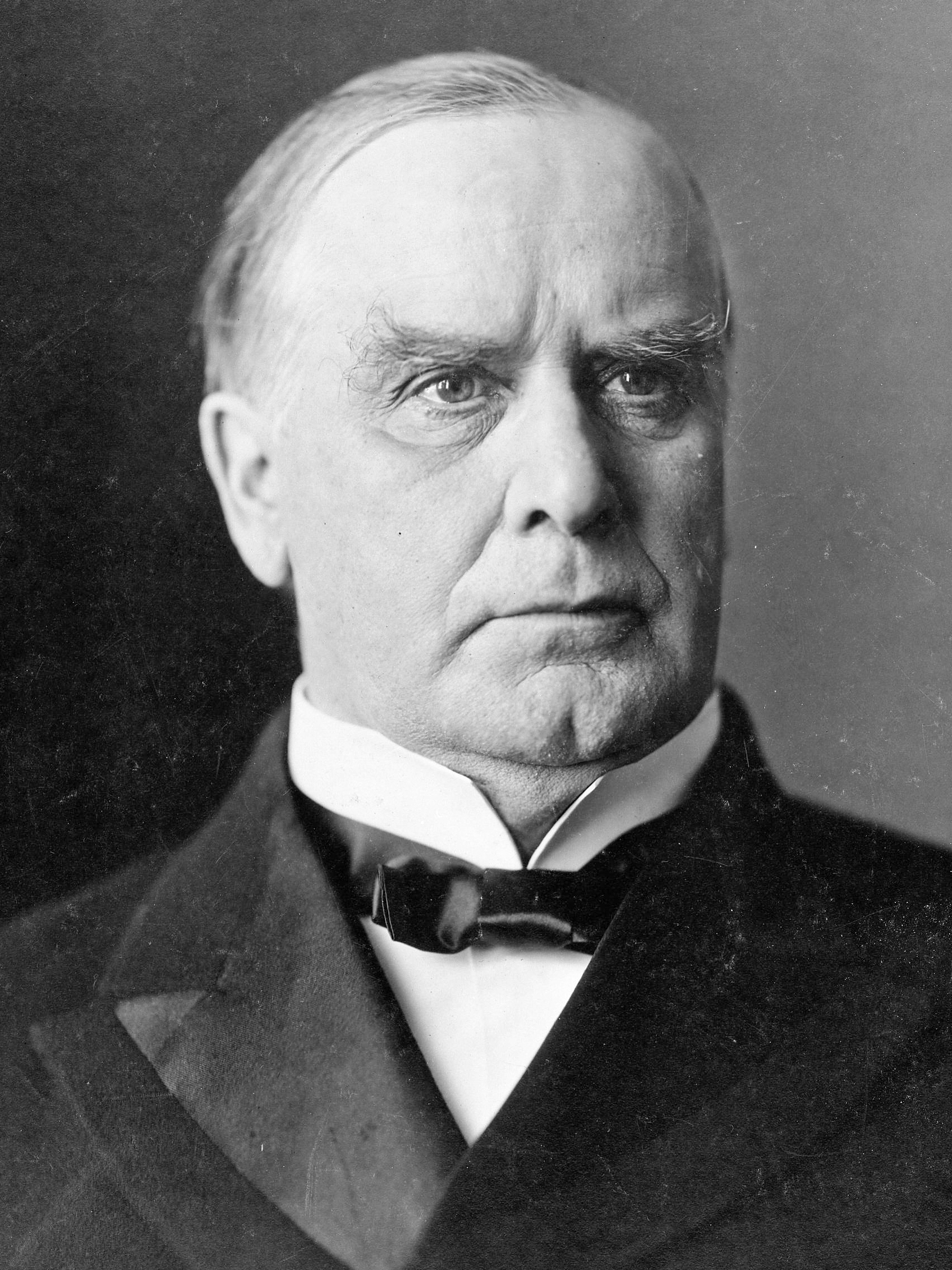

Nominee	William McKinley	William Jennings Bryan
Party	Republican	Democratic
Home state	Ohio	Nebraska
Running mate	Theodore Roosevelt	Adlai Stevenson I
Electoral vote	4	0
Popular vote	57,456	44,833
Percentage	53.44%	41.70%
County results
McKinley
40–50%
50–60%
60–70%
Bryan
50–60%
60–70%
President before election
William McKinley
Republican
Elected President
William McKinley
Republican

The 1900 United States presidential election in Washington took place on November 6, 1900. All contemporary 45 states were part of the 1900 United States presidential election. State voters chose four electors to the Electoral College, which selected the president and vice president.

Washington was won by the Republican nominees, incumbent President William McKinley of Ohio and his running mate Theodore Roosevelt of New York. They defeated the Democratic nominees, former U.S. Representative and 1896 Democratic presidential nominee William Jennings Bryan and his running mate, former Vice President Adlai Stevenson I. McKinley won the state by a margin of 11.74% in this rematch of the 1896 presidential election. The return of economic prosperity, recent victory in the Spanish–American War, continued American expansion in the Philippines, and the fading of the Populist revolt of the previous decade ensured that incumbent President McKinley would not have any trouble carrying the state.

McKinley had previously lost Washington to Bryan four years earlier while Bryan would later lose the state to William Howard Taft in 1908.

== Results ==
General Election Results
Party	Pledged to	Elector	Votes
Republican Party	William McKinley	Samuel G. Cosgrove	57,456
Republican Party	William McKinley	Frank W. Hastings	56,536
Republican Party	William McKinley	Charles Sweeney	56,263
Republican Party	William McKinley	John Boyd	56,223
Democratic Party	William Jennings Bryan	N. G. Blalock	44,833
Democratic Party	William Jennings Bryan	George F. Cotterill	44,486
Democratic Party	William Jennings Bryan	Joseph G. Helm	44,311
Democratic Party	William Jennings Bryan	Fred Reeves	44,081
Prohibition Party	John G. Woolley	F. L. Gwinn	2,363
Prohibition Party	John G. Woolley	G. W. Plummer	2,180
Prohibition Party	John G. Woolley	H. H. Brown	2,134
Prohibition Party	John G. Woolley	H. D. Skinner	2,125
Social Democratic Party	Eugene V. Debs	Henry Wieck	2,006
Social Democratic Party	Eugene V. Debs	Lewis Thompson	1,998
Social Democratic Party	Eugene V. Debs	Walter Griggs	1,984
Social Democratic Party	Eugene V. Debs	Alonzo G. Seibert	1,968
Socialist Labor Party	Joseph F. Malloney	H. R. Coulson	866
Socialist Labor Party	Joseph F. Malloney	L. S. Thallheimer	788
Socialist Labor Party	Joseph F. Malloney	J. B. Schaible	784
Socialist Labor Party	Joseph F. Malloney	L. A. Tennery	775
Votes cast (Note: Based on totals for highest elector on each ticket)			107,524

=== Results by county ===
County	William McKinley Republican		William Jennings Bryan Democratic		John G. Woolley Prohibition		Eugene V. Debs Social Democratic		Joseph F. Malloney Socialist Labor		Margin		Total votes cast (Note: Based on highest elector on each ticket)
County	#	%	#	%	#	%	#	%	#	%	#	%	Total votes cast
Adams	461	44.98%	523	51.02%	30	2.93%	9	0.88%	2	0.20%	-62	-6.05%	1,025
Asotin	398	52.37%	328	43.16%	23	3.03%	3	0.39%	8	1.05%	70	9.21%	760
Chehalis	1,850	58.77%	1,081	34.34%	77	2.45%	108	3.43%	32	1.02%	769	24.43%	3,148
Chelan	577	48.98%	573	48.64%	12	1.02%	11	0.93%	5	0.42%	4	0.34%	1,178
Clallam	723	60.45%	407	34.03%	5	0.42%	51	4.26%	10	0.84%	316	26.42%	1,196
Clarke	1,668	57.88%	1,025	35.57%	79	2.74%	90	3.12%	20	0.69%	643	22.31%	2,882
Columbia	899	54.72%	706	42.97%	27	1.64%	9	0.55%	2	0.12%	193	11.75%	1,643
Cowlitz	1,171	63.33%	619	33.48%	34	1.84%	16	0.87%	9	0.49%	552	29.85%	1,849
Douglas	516	44.44%	615	52.97%	20	1.72%	9	0.78%	1	0.09%	-99	-8.53%	1,161
Ferry	423	33.25%	830	65.25%	8	0.63%	9	0.71%	2	0.16%	-407	-32.00%	1,272
Franklin	52	37.41%	81	58.27%	3	2.16%	0	0.00%	3	2.16%	-29	-20.86%	139
Garfield	528	52.59%	437	43.53%	18	1.79%	17	1.69%	4	0.40%	91	9.06%	1,004
Island	263	62.62%	123	29.29%	13	3.10%	14	3.33%	7	1.67%	140	33.33%	420
Jefferson	684	61.73%	392	35.38%	19	1.71%	4	0.36%	9	0.81%	292	26.35%	1,108
King	10,218	54.26%	7,804	41.44%	318	1.69%	263	1.40%	229	1.22%	2,414	12.82%	18,832
Kitsap	880	58.43%	489	32.47%	75	4.98%	46	3.05%	16	1.06%	391	25.96%	1,506
Kittitas	1,139	52.88%	934	43.36%	52	2.41%	20	0.93%	9	0.42%	205	9.52%	2,154
Klickitat	906	61.01%	495	33.33%	58	3.91%	22	1.48%	4	0.27%	411	27.68%	1,485
Lewis	1,907	55.40%	1,382	40.15%	94	2.73%	43	1.25%	16	0.46%	525	15.25%	3,442
Lincoln	1,414	45.58%	1,585	51.10%	66	2.13%	30	0.97%	7	0.23%	-171	-5.51%	3,102
Mason	514	51.40%	455	45.50%	11	1.10%	13	1.30%	7	0.70%	59	5.90%	1,000
Okanogan	457	38.08%	714	59.50%	10	0.83%	17	1.42%	2	0.17%	-257	-21.42%	1,200
Pacific	887	66.74%	393	29.57%	27	2.03%	15	1.13%	7	0.53%	494	37.17%	1,329
Pierce	6,269	59.20%	3,702	34.96%	204	1.93%	296	2.80%	118	1.11%	2,567	24.24%	10,589
San Juan	428	61.49%	245	35.20%	10	1.44%	6	0.86%	7	1.01%	183	26.29%	696
Skagit	1,814	55.90%	1,220	37.60%	65	2.00%	115	3.54%	31	0.96%	594	18.31%	3,245
Skamania	175	45.10%	203	52.32%	4	1.03%	4	1.03%	2	0.52%	-28	-7.22%	388
Snohomish	2,961	51.80%	2,478	43.35%	179	3.13%	64	1.12%	34	0.59%	483	8.45%	5,716
Spokane	5,515	49.84%	5,125	46.32%	306	2.77%	81	0.73%	38	0.34%	390	3.52%	11,065
Stevens	1,121	39.95%	1,612	57.45%	38	1.35%	27	0.96%	8	0.29%	-491	-17.50%	2,806
Thurston	1,298	54.56%	978	41.11%	36	1.51%	51	2.14%	16	0.67%	320	13.45%	2,379
Wahkiakum	396	61.78%	207	32.29%	10	1.56%	20	3.12%	8	1.25%	189	29.49%	641
Walla Walla	2,119	57.44%	1,480	40.12%	61	1.65%	20	0.54%	9	0.24%	639	17.32%	3,689
Whatcom	2,952	56.62%	1,700	32.60%	145	2.78%	282	5.41%	135	2.59%	1,252	24.01%	5,214
Whitman	2,366	42.52%	2,826	50.78%	180	3.23%	156	2.80%	37	0.66%	-460	-8.27%	5,565
Yakima	1,507	55.90%	1,066	39.54%	46	1.71%	65	2.41%	12	0.45%	441	16.36%	2,696
Totals	57,456	53.44%	44,833	41.70%	2,363	2.20%	2,006	1.87%	866	0.81%	12,623	11.74%	107,524

==== Counties that flipped from Populist to Republican ====
- Asotin
- Chehalis
- Clallam
- Clark
- Columbia
- Garfield
- King
- Kittitas
- Lewis
- Mason
- Pierce
- Skagit
- Snohomish
- Spokane
- Thurston
- Wahkiakum
- Walla Walla
- Whatcom
- Yakima

== See also ==
- United States presidential elections in Washington (state)
