= 1892 United States presidential election in Washington (state) =

- November 8, 1892
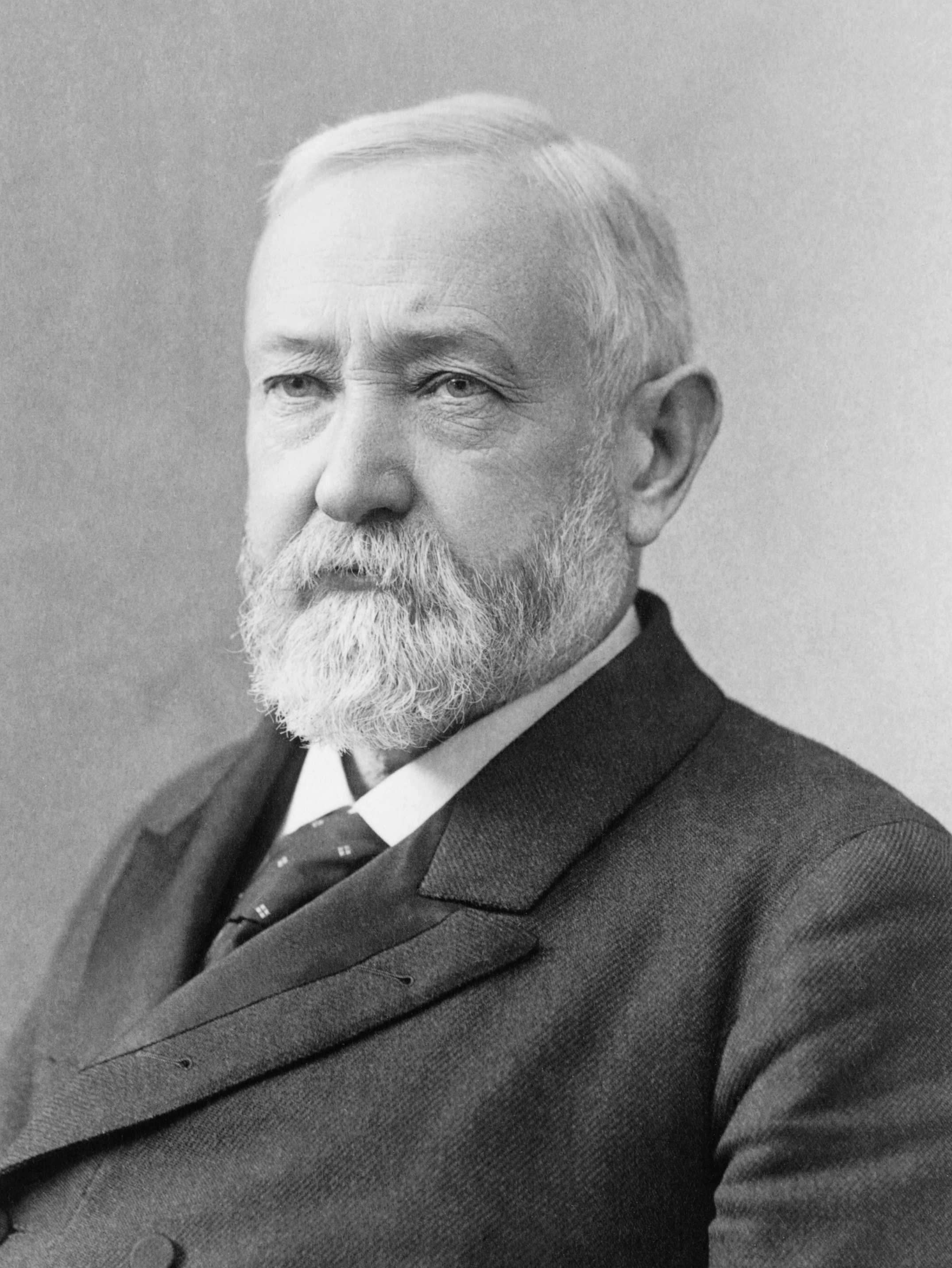

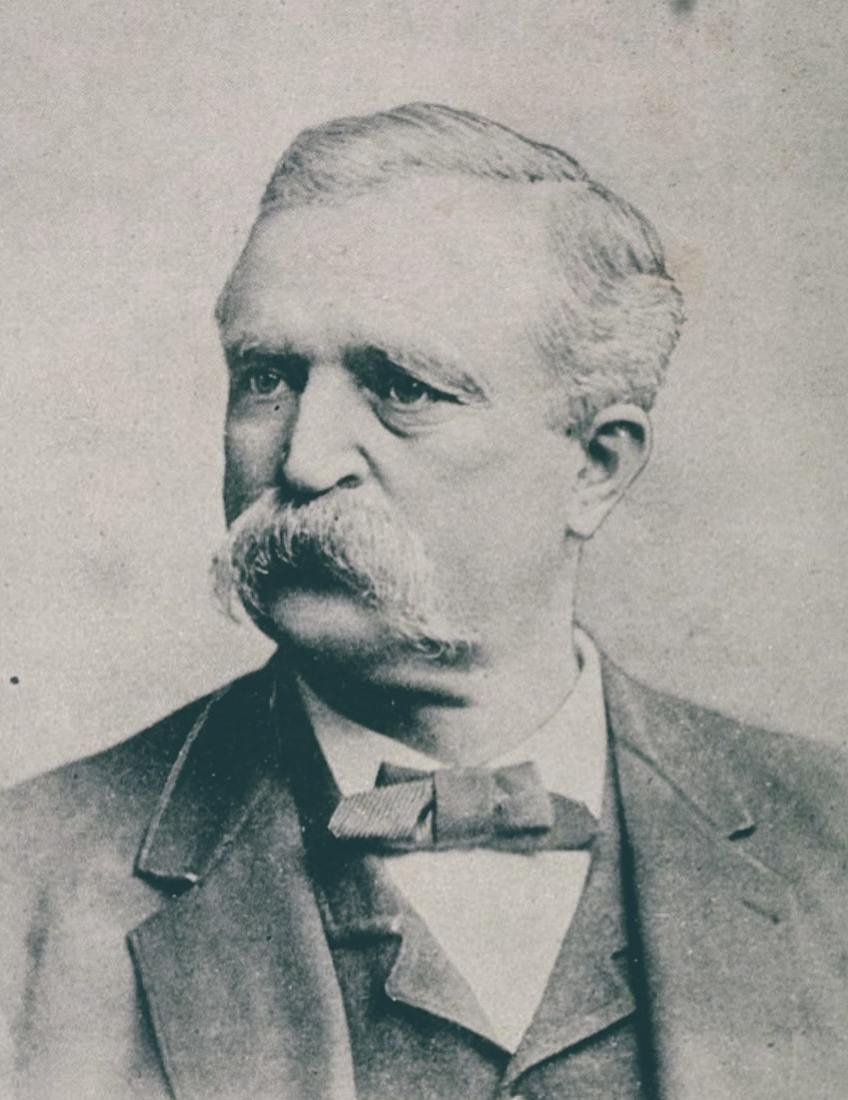
Nominee	Benjamin Harrison	Grover Cleveland	James B. Weaver
Party	Republican	Democratic	Populist
Home state	Indiana	New York	Iowa
Running mate	Whitelaw Reid	Adlai E. Stevenson I	James G. Field
Electoral vote	4	0	0
Popular vote	36,470	29,844	19,105
Percentage	41.46%	33.92%	21.72%
County results
Harrison
30–40%
40–50%
50–60%
Cleveland
40–50%
President before election
Benjamin Harrison
Republican
Elected President
Grover Cleveland
Democratic

The 1892 United States presidential election in Washington took place on November 8, 1892, as part of the 1892 United States presidential election. Voters chose four representatives, or electors to the Electoral College, who voted for president and vice president.

Washington participated in its first ever presidential election, having become the 42nd state on November 11, 1889. The state voted for the Republican incumbent president, Benjamin Harrison, over the Democratic candidate and former president, Grover Cleveland by a margin of 6,626 votes, or a 7.53% margin.

== Results ==
General Election Results
Party	Pledged to	Elector	Votes
Republican Party	Benjamin Harrison	John S. McMillin	36,470 (Note: The stated total for McMillin is 36,460 but it's noted on the original canvass that the county figures add up to 36,470, so it seems likely the former figure is a mistake)
Republican Party	Benjamin Harrison	George V. Calhoun	36,457
Republican Party	Benjamin Harrison	Chester F. White	36,242
Republican Party	Benjamin Harrison	Ignatius A. Navarre	36,138
Democratic Party	Grover Cleveland	Louis K. Church	29,844
Democratic Party	Grover Cleveland	Franklin D. Arnold	29,828
Democratic Party	Grover Cleveland	John W. Stearns	29,770
Democratic Party	Grover Cleveland	Lew H. Plattor	29,703
People's Party	James B. Weaver	William J. Caldwell	19,105
People's Party	James B. Weaver	James Bassett	19,093
People's Party	James B. Weaver	P. B. Barrows	19,065
People's Party	James B. Weaver	William Lee Sr.	19,054
Prohibition Party	John Bidwell	H. N. Belt	2,553
Prohibition Party	John Bidwell	D. R. Bigelow	2,522
Prohibition Party	John Bidwell	A. Macready	2,508
Prohibition Party	John Bidwell	J. W. Peter	2,506
Votes cast (Note: Based on totals for highest elector on each ticket)			87,972

=== Results by county ===
County	Benjamin Harrison Republican		Grover Cleveland Democratic		James B. Weaver Populist		John Bidwell Prohibition		Margin		Total votes cast (Note: Based on highest elector on each ticket)
County	#	%	#	%	#	%	#	%	#	%	Total votes cast
Adams	244	42.81%	139	24.39%	181	31.75%	6	1.05%	63 (Note: Margin over Weaver)	11.05%	570
Asotin	194	52.72%	143	38.86%	16	4.35%	15	4.08%	51	13.86%	368
Chehalis	990	41.98%	800	33.93%	525	22.26%	43	1.82%	190	8.06%	2,358
Clallam	518	38.20%	448	33.04%	383	28.24%	7	0.52%	70	5.16%	1,356
Clarke	1,069	41.51%	966	37.51%	449	17.44%	91	3.53%	103	4.00%	2,575
Columbia	615	39.30%	672	42.94%	185	11.82%	93	5.94%	-57	-3.64%	1,565
Cowlitz	738	41.93%	556	31.59%	430	24.43%	36	2.05%	182	10.34%	1,760
Douglas	345	37.70%	253	27.65%	298	32.57%	19	2.08%	47	5.14%	915
Franklin	28	23.53%	54	45.38%	34	28.57%	3	2.52%	-20	-16.81%	119
Garfield	351	38.66%	288	31.72%	224	24.67%	45	4.96%	63	6.94%	908
Island	161	40.55%	127	31.99%	93	23.43%	16	4.03%	34	8.56%	397
Jefferson	610	43.88%	665	47.84%	98	7.05%	17	1.72%	-55	-3.96%	1,390
King	6,520	44.31%	4,925	33.47%	2,801	19.04%	467	3.17%	1,595	10.84%	14,713
Kitsap	438	34.60%	370	29.23%	400	31.60%	58	4.58%	38	3.00%	1,266
Kittitas	855	37.83%	800	35.40%	573	25.35%	32	1.42%	55	2.43%	2,260
Klickitat	616	47.02%	279	21.30%	367	28.02%	48	3.66%	249	19.01%	1,310
Lewis	1,350	41.49%	1,014	31.16%	718	22.07%	172	5.29%	336	10.33%	3,254
Lincoln	915	37.58%	931	38.23%	523	21.48%	66	2.71%	-16	-0.66%	2,435
Mason	352	42.00%	356	42.48%	124	14.80%	6	0.72%	-4	-0.48%	838
Okanogan	577	50.04%	425	36.86%	146	12.66%	5	0.43%	152	13.18%	1,153
Pacific	759	52.60%	559	38.74%	86	5.96%	39	2.70%	200	13.86%	1,443
Pierce	3,954	37.07%	3,621	33.95%	2,793	26.19%	297	2.78%	333	3.12%	10,665
San Juan	348	54.89%	226	35.65%	45	7.10%	15	2.37%	122	19.24%	634
Skagit	1,246	42.92%	923	31.79%	665	22.91%	69	2.38%	323	11.13%	2,903
Skamania	91	39.74%	99	43.23%	34	14.85%	5	2.18%	-8	-3.49%	229
Snohomish	1,488	34.93%	1,390	32.63%	1,302	30.56%	80	1.88%	98	2.30%	4,260
Spokane	3,367	45.45%	2,247	30.33%	1,616	21.81%	178	2.40%	1,120	15.12%	7,408
Stevens	622	37.25%	501	30.00%	529	31.68%	18	1.08%	93	5.57%	1,670
Thurston	1,043	41.70%	810	32.39%	541	21.63%	107	4.28%	233	9.32%	2,501
Wahkiakum	239	46.32%	224	43.41%	49	9.50%	4	0.78%	15	2.91%	516
Walla Walla	1,362	47.14%	1,313	45.45%	88	3.05%	126	4.36%	49	1.70%	2,889
Whatcom	1,709	41.50%	1,161	28.19%	1,080	26.23%	168	4.08%	548	13.31%	4,118
Whitman	2,131	37.26%	2,061	36.04%	1,339	23.41%	188	3.29%	70	1.22%	5,719
Yakima	625	41.47%	498	33.05%	370	24.55%	14	0.93%	127	8.43%	1,507
Totals	36,470	41.46%	29,844	33.92%	19,105	21.72%	2,553	2.90%	6,626	7.53%	87,972

== See also ==
- United States presidential elections in Washington (state)
