= 1896 United States presidential election in Washington (state) =

- November 3, 1896

Nominee	William Jennings Bryan	William McKinley
Party	Populist	Republican
Alliance	Democratic
Home state	Nebraska	Ohio
Running mate	Thomas E. Watson (Note: Received 2 electoral votes for Vice President) (Populist); Arthur Sewall (Democratic)	Garret Hobart
Electoral vote	4	0
Popular vote	51,646	39,153
Percentage	55.19%	41.84%
County results
Bryan
40–50%
50–60%
60–70%
70–80%
80–90%
McKinley
40–50%
50–60%
60–70%
Tie
40–50%
President before election
Grover Cleveland
Democratic
Elected President
William McKinley
Republican

The 1896 United States presidential election in Washington took place on November 3, 1896. All contemporary 45 states were part of the 1896 United States presidential election. State voters chose four electors to the Electoral College, which selected the president and vice president.

Washington was won by the People's Party nominees, former U.S. Representative William Jennings Bryan of Nebraska and his running mate Thomas E. Watson of Maine. Two electors cast their vice presidential ballots for Bryan's Democratic Party running mate Arthur Sewall. They defeated the Republican nominees, former Governor of Ohio William McKinley and his running mate Garret Hobart of New Jersey. Bryan won the state by a margin of 13.35%,

As a result of his win in the state, Bryan would become the first Democratic (Note: Most of Bryan's vote came on the Populist ticket) presidential candidate to win Washington state. He would later lose the state against McKinley in 1900 and then against William Howard Taft in 1908. The state would not vote Democratic again until Woodrow Wilson won the state in 1916.

Until 2024, this was the only presidential election since statehood in which Clallam County gave more than 50% of its vote to the losing candidate nationwide.

== Results ==
General Election Results
Party	Pledged to	Elector	Votes
People's Party	William Jennings Bryan (Note: Voted for Arthur Sewall for Vice President)	N. T. Caton	51,646
People's Party	William Jennings Bryan	I. N. Maxwell	50,895
People's Party	William Jennings Bryan (Note: Voted for Thomas E. Watson for Vice President)	John B. Hart	50,842
People's Party	William Jennings Bryan	D. C. Newman	50,643
Republican Party	William McKinley	L. H. Anderson	39,153
Republican Party	William McKinley	John N. Conna	38,574
Republican Party	William McKinley	Solomon Smith	38,573
Republican Party	William McKinley	W. K. Kennedy	38,439
Democratic Party	John M. Palmer	Thomas Burke	1,668
Democratic Party	John M. Palmer	George W. Stapleton	1,526
Democratic Party	John M. Palmer	W. S. Yearsley	1,517
Democratic Party	John M. Palmer	Y. C. Blalock	1,503
Prohibition Party	Joshua Levering	D. T. Denny	968
Prohibition Party	Joshua Levering	R. F. Whittum	844
Prohibition Party	Joshua Levering	J. J. Ashby	826
Prohibition Party	Joshua Levering	O. J. Gist	795
National Party	Charles E. Bentley	Charles Goddard	148
National Party	Charles E. Bentley	R. H. Peter	135
National Party	Charles E. Bentley	J. B. Redford	128
National Party	Charles E. Bentley	Boyd Tyler	125
Votes cast (Note: Based on totals for highest elector on each ticket)			93,583

=== Results by county ===
County	William Jennings Bryan Populist		John M. Palmer Democratic		William McKinley Republican		Joshua Levering Prohibition		Charles Bentley National		Margin		Total votes cast (Note: Based on highest elector on each ticket)
County	#	%	#	%	#	%	#	%	#	%	#	%	Total votes cast
Adams	363	57.99%	9	1.44%	243	38.82%	11	1.76%	0	0.00%	120	19.17%	626
Asotin	254	52.16%	15	3.08%	214	43.94%	3	0.62%	1	0.21%	40	8.22%	487
Chehalis	1,312	49.68%	38	1.44%	1,267	47.97%	21	0.80%	3	0.11%	45	1.71%	2,641
Clallam	676	52.53%	41	3.19%	559	43.43%	6	0.47%	5	0.39%	117	9.10%	1,287
Clarke	1,497	48.23%	50	1.61%	1,497	48.23%	51	1.64%	9	0.29%	0	0.00%	3,104
Columbia	847	51.30%	15	0.91%	776	47.00%	9	0.55%	4	0.24%	71	4.30%	1,651
Cowlitz	935	47.03%	39	1.96%	989	49.75%	23	1.16%	2	0.10%	-54	-2.72%	1,988
Douglas	722	67.04%	11	1.02%	334	31.01%	10	0.93%	0	0.00%	388	36.03%	1,077
Franklin	108	70.59%	5	3.27%	38	24.84%	2	1.31%	0	0.00%	70	45.75%	153
Garfield	469	53.60%	13	1.49%	378	43.20%	14	1.60%	1	0.11%	91	10.40%	875
Island	181	44.69%	10	2.47%	206	50.86%	7	1.73%	1	0.25%	-25	-6.17%	405
Jefferson	500	40.00%	36	2.88%	704	56.32%	8	0.64%	2	0.16%	-204	-16.32%	1,250
King	7,497	52.41%	236	1.65%	6,413	44.83%	144	1.01%	15	0.10%	1,084	7.58%	14,305
Kitsap	702	47.15%	26	1.75%	728	48.89%	29	1.95%	4	0.27%	-26	-1.74%	1,489
Kittitas	1,296	53.87%	40	1.66%	1,044	43.39%	23	0.96%	3	0.12%	252	10.48%	2,406
Klickitat	664	41.63%	44	2.76%	876	54.92%	11	0.69%	0	0.00%	-212	-13.29%	1,595
Lewis	1,584	48.04%	70	2.12%	1,594	48.35%	37	1.12%	12	0.36%	-10	-0.31%	3,297
Lincoln	1,715	66.27%	56	2.16%	781	30.18%	31	1.20%	5	0.19%	934	36.09%	2,588
Mason	650	60.35%	17	1.58%	397	36.86%	11	1.02%	2	0.19%	253	23.49%	1,077
Okanogan	912	72.96%	38	3.04%	284	22.72%	11	0.88%	5	0.40%	628	50.24%	1,250
Pacific	512	33.88%	50	3.31%	925	61.22%	19	1.26%	5	0.33%	-413	-27.34%	1,511
Pierce	5,404	52.45%	166	1.61%	4,651	45.14%	58	0.56%	24	0.23%	753	7.31%	10,303
San Juan	283	40.14%	8	1.13%	411	58.30%	3	0.43%	0	0.00%	-128	-18.16%	705
Skagit	1,573	53.85%	50	1.71%	1,268	43.41%	28	0.96%	2	0.07%	305	10.44%	2,921
Skamania	237	62.70%	15	3.97%	122	32.28%	4	1.06%	0	0.00%	115	30.42%	378
Snohomish	2,775	58.13%	83	1.74%	1,871	39.19%	43	0.90%	2	0.04%	904	18.94%	4,774
Spokane	5,725	66.17%	104	1.20%	2,701	31.22%	111	1.28%	11	0.13%	3,024	34.95%	8,652
Stevens	1,880	78.50%	46	1.92%	433	18.08%	26	1.09%	10	0.42%	1,447	60.42%	2,395
Thurston	1,371	55.08%	44	1.77%	1,052	42.27%	17	0.68%	5	0.20%	319	12.81%	2,489
Wahkiakum	376	54.57%	20	2.90%	290	42.09%	3	0.44%	0	0.00%	86	12.48%	689
Walla Walla	1,652	49.30%	64	1.91%	1,596	47.63%	37	1.10%	2	0.06%	56	1.67%	3,351
Whatcom	2,177	50.98%	50	1.17%	1,971	46.16%	68	1.59%	4	0.09%	206	4.82%	4,270
Whitman	3,578	66.67%	112	2.09%	1,592	29.66%	77	1.43%	8	0.15%	1,986	37.01%	5,367
Yakima	1,219	54.74%	47	2.11%	948	42.57%	12	0.54%	1	0.04%	271	12.17%	2,227
Totals	51,646	55.19%	1,668	1.78%	39,153	41.84%	968	1.03%	148	0.16%	12,493	13.35%	93,583

==== Counties that flipped from Republican to Populist ====
- Adams
- Asotin
- Chehalis
- Clallam
- Clark
- Douglas
- Garfield
- King
- Kittitas
- Lewis
- Okanogan
- Pierce
- Skagit
- Snohomish
- Spokane
- Stevens
- Thurston
- Wahkiakum
- Walla Walla
- Whatcom
- Whitman
- Yakima

==== Counties that flipped from Democratic to Republican ====
- Jefferson

== See also ==
- United States presidential elections in Washington (state)
