= 1980 United States presidential election in Washington (state) =

- November 4, 1980

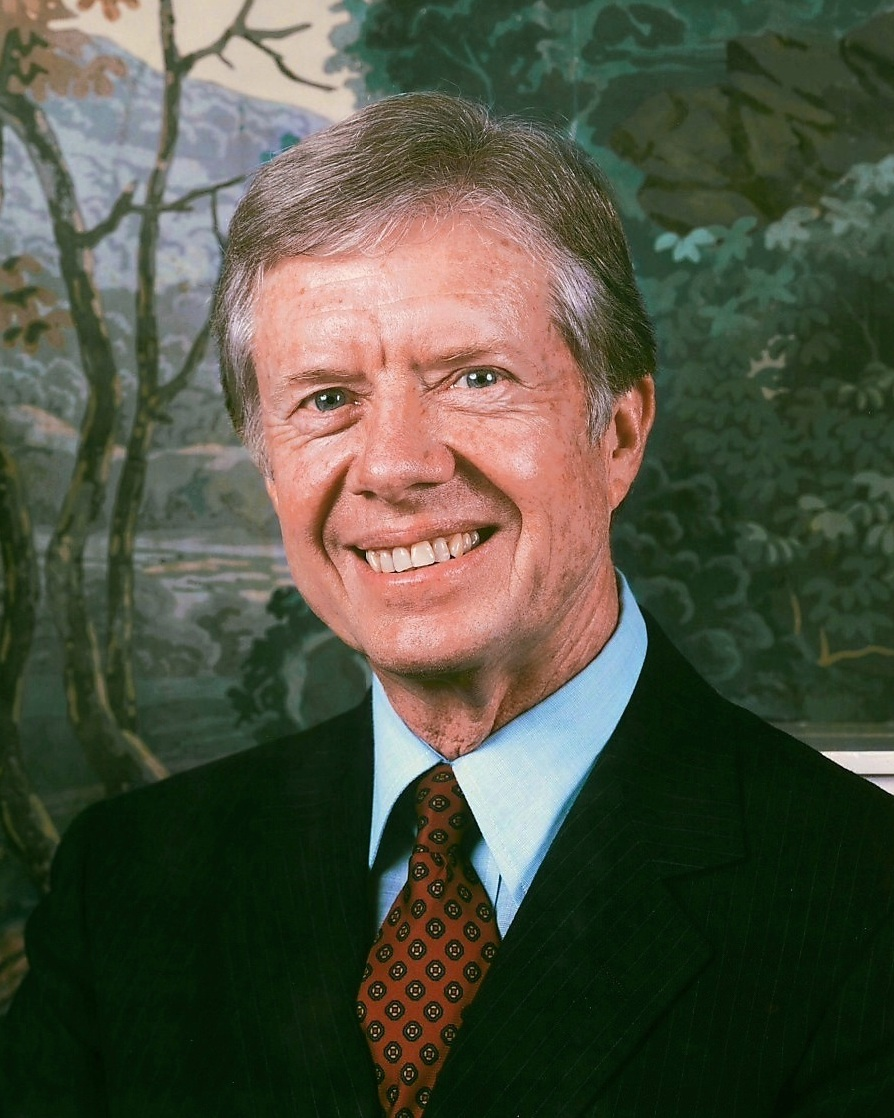

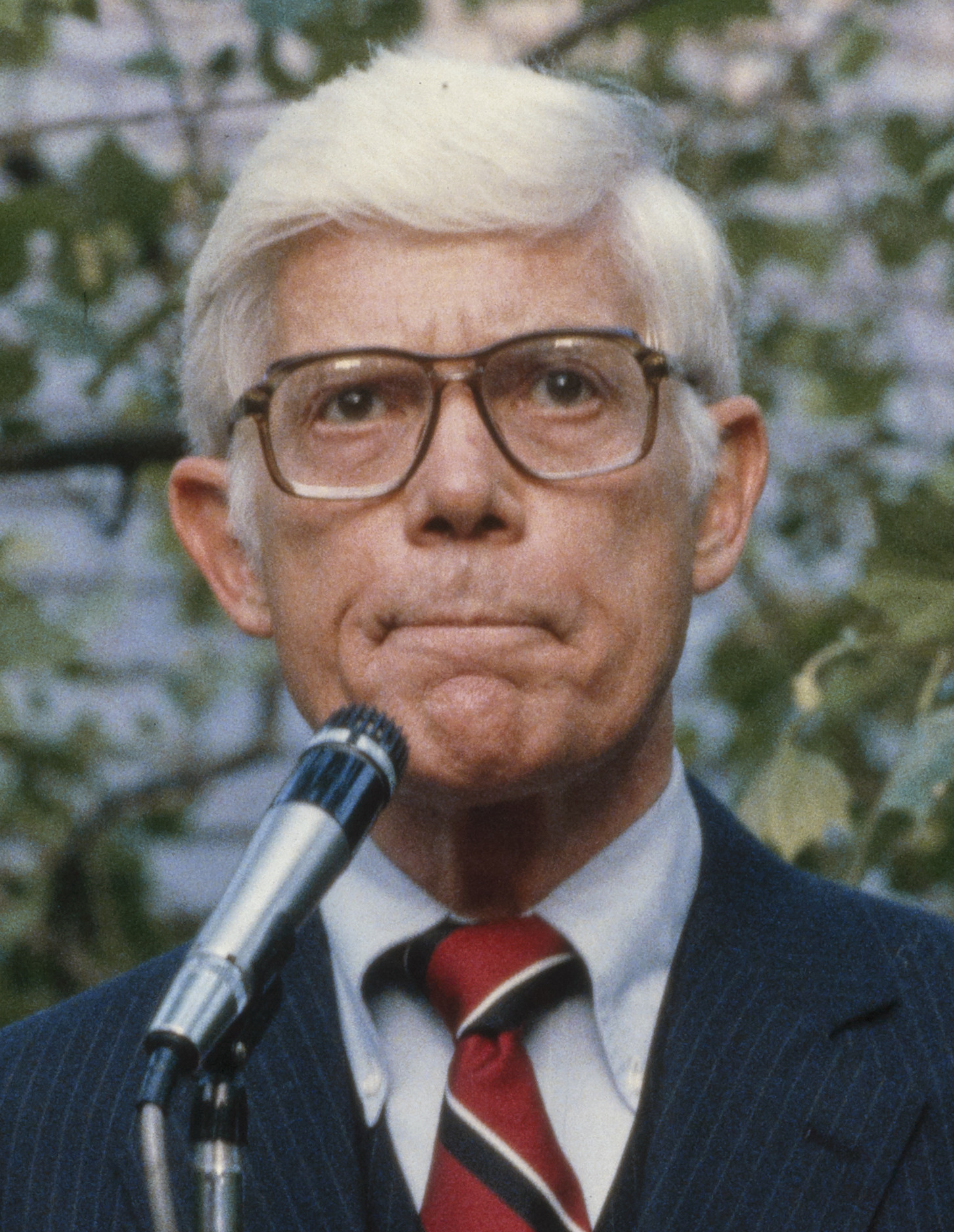
Nominee	Ronald Reagan	Jimmy Carter	John B. Anderson
Party	Republican	Democratic	Independent
Home state	California	Georgia	Illinois
Running mate	George H. W. Bush	Walter Mondale	Patrick Lucey
Electoral vote	9	0	0
Popular vote	865,244	650,193	185,073
Percentage	49.66%	37.32%	10.62%
County results
Reagan
40–50%
50–60%
60–70%
Carter
40–50%
President before election
Jimmy Carter
Democratic
Elected President
Ronald Reagan
Republican

The 1980 United States presidential election in Washington was held on November 4, 1980 as part of the 1980 United States presidential election. State voters chose nine representatives, or electors, to the Electoral College, who voted for president and vice president.

Republican candidate Ronald Reagan won the state of Washington with 49.66 percent of the vote. During the previous election in 1976, Reagan, who was not on the ballot in any of the fifty states, received one of Washington's electoral votes by faithless elector Mike Padden.

Reagan won every county in the state except Grays Harbor and Pacific Counties, neither of which ever voted Republican between 1956 and 2012. As of the 2024 presidential election, Reagan's 1980 effort remains the last Republican win in Jefferson County and was the last in Cowlitz County until 2016.

Third-party candidate John B. Anderson did well in Western Washington, gaining many voters from disaffected major-party supporters and exceeding 14 percent of the vote in Kitsap and San Juan Counties. Anderson was less successful east of the Cascades, apart from college-influenced Whitman County. 1980 marks the last time in which Washington state voted more Republican than the nation at-large.

== Results ==
1980 United States presidential election in Washington
Party	Candidate	Votes	Percentage	Electoral votes
Republican	Ronald Reagan	865,244	49.66%	9
Democrat	Jimmy Carter (incumbent)	650,193	37.32%	0
Independent	John B. Anderson	185,073	10.62%	0
Libertarian	Edward Clark	29,213	1.68%	0
Citizens	Barry Commoner	9,403	0.54%	0
Socialist Workers	Clifton DeBerry	1,137	0.07%	0
Socialist	David McReynolds	956	0.05%	0
Communist	Gus Hall	834	0.05%	0
Workers World	Deirdre Griswold	341	0.02%	0
Totals		1,742,394	100.00%	9

=== By county ===
County	Ronald Reagan Republican		Jimmy Carter Democratic		John B. Anderson Independent		Other candidates Various parties		Margin		Total votes cast
County	#	%	#	%	#	%	#	%	#	%	Total votes cast
Adams	3,248	68.01%	1,223	25.61%	255	5.34%	50	1.05%	2,025	42.40%	4,776
Asotin	3,275	49.18%	2,724	40.91%	539	8.09%	121	1.82%	551	8.27%	6,659
Benton	28,728	64.68%	11,561	26.03%	3,301	7.43%	823	1.85%	17,167	38.65%	44,413
Chelan	11,299	56.92%	6,483	32.66%	1,608	8.10%	460	2.32%	4,816	24.26%	19,850
Clallam	11,515	51.65%	8,029	36.01%	2,172	9.74%	580	2.60%	3,486	15.64%	22,296
Clark	33,223	46.10%	30,584	42.43%	6,445	8.94%	1,823	2.53%	2,639	3.66%	72,075
Columbia	1,349	64.67%	587	28.14%	119	5.70%	31	1.49%	762	36.53%	2,086
Cowlitz	13,154	45.93%	12,560	43.86%	2,336	8.16%	589	2.06%	594	2.07%	28,639
Douglas	5,171	59.38%	2,833	32.53%	564	6.48%	141	1.62%	2,338	26.85%	8,709
Ferry	1,108	52.76%	802	38.19%	127	6.05%	63	3.00%	306	14.57%	2,100
Franklin	7,327	61.26%	3,719	31.09%	699	5.84%	216	1.81%	3,608	30.16%	11,961
Garfield	875	57.60%	509	33.51%	122	8.03%	13	0.86%	366	24.09%	1,519
Grant	11,152	61.29%	5,673	31.18%	1,091	6.00%	280	1.54%	5,479	30.11%	18,196
Grays Harbor	10,226	40.19%	11,290	44.37%	3,267	12.84%	661	2.60%	-1,064	-4.18%	25,444
Island	10,926	58.87%	5,422	29.21%	1,800	9.70%	411	2.21%	5,504	29.66%	18,559
Jefferson	3,645	44.61%	3,279	40.13%	876	10.72%	370	4.53%	366	4.48%	8,170
King	272,567	45.42%	235,046	39.16%	76,119	12.68%	16,425	2.74%	37,521	6.25%	600,157
Kitsap	29,420	48.79%	20,893	34.65%	8,525	14.14%	1,458	2.42%	8,527	14.14%	60,296
Kittitas	5,359	49.86%	4,075	37.91%	1,066	9.92%	248	2.31%	1,284	11.95%	10,748
Klickitat	3,113	49.54%	2,596	41.31%	423	6.73%	152	2.42%	517	8.23%	6,284
Lewis	13,636	59.94%	6,962	30.60%	1,603	7.05%	548	2.41%	6,674	29.34%	22,749
Lincoln	3,324	62.28%	1,597	29.92%	357	6.69%	59	1.11%	1,727	32.36%	5,337
Mason	6,745	49.10%	5,241	38.15%	1,353	9.85%	398	2.90%	1,504	10.95%	13,737
Okanogan	6,460	51.71%	4,634	37.09%	1,030	8.24%	369	2.95%	1,826	14.62%	12,493
Pacific	3,132	39.09%	3,727	46.52%	945	11.79%	208	2.60%	-595	-7.43%	8,012
Pend Oreille	2,136	55.70%	1,399	36.48%	221	5.76%	79	2.06%	737	19.22%	3,835
Pierce	90,247	51.13%	64,444	36.51%	18,345	10.39%	3,475	1.97%	25,803	14.62%	176,511
San Juan	2,363	46.97%	1,666	33.11%	728	14.47%	274	5.45%	697	13.85%	5,031
Skagit	15,520	50.68%	11,299	36.90%	2,854	9.32%	950	3.10%	4,221	13.78%	30,623
Skamania	1,416	45.75%	1,373	44.36%	218	7.04%	88	2.84%	43	1.39%	3,095
Snohomish	66,153	48.68%	52,003	38.26%	14,465	10.64%	3,286	2.42%	14,150	10.41%	135,907
Spokane	78,096	55.51%	49,263	35.02%	11,258	8.00%	2,068	1.47%	28,833	20.49%	140,685
Stevens	7,094	61.53%	3,584	31.08%	601	5.21%	251	2.18%	3,510	30.44%	11,530
Thurston	26,369	48.10%	20,508	37.41%	5,993	10.93%	1,953	3.56%	5,861	10.69%	54,823
Wahkiakum	828	46.57%	751	42.24%	148	8.32%	51	2.87%	77	4.33%	1,778
Walla Walla	11,223	59.14%	5,825	30.70%	1,591	8.38%	338	1.78%	5,398	28.44%	18,977
Whatcom	21,371	46.40%	18,430	40.02%	4,906	10.65%	1,350	2.93%	2,941	6.39%	46,057
Whitman	8,636	50.73%	5,726	33.63%	2,331	13.69%	331	1.94%	2,910	17.09%	17,024
Yakima	33,815	55.21%	21,873	35.71%	4,672	7.63%	893	1.46%	11,942	19.50%	61,253
Totals	865,244	49.66%	650,193	37.32%	185,073	10.62%	41,884	2.40%	215,051	12.34%	1,742,394

==== Counties that flipped from Democratic to Republican ====
- Asotin
- Clark
- Cowlitz
- Ferry
- Jefferson
- Kitsap
- Kittitas
- Klickitat
- Mason
- Okanogan
- Pend Oreille
- Pierce
- Skamania
- Snohomish
- Thurston
- Wahkiakum

== See also ==
- United States presidential elections in Washington (state)
- Presidency of Ronald Reagan
