= 1928 United States presidential election in Washington (state) =

- November 6, 1928

Nominee	Herbert Hoover	Al Smith
Party	Republican	Democratic
Home state	California	New York
Running mate	Charles Curtis	Joseph T. Robinson
Electoral vote	7	0
Popular vote	335,844	156,772
Percentage	67.06%	31.30%
County results
Hoover
50–60%
60–70%
70–80%
Smith
50–60%
President before election
Calvin Coolidge
Republican
Elected President
Herbert Hoover
Republican

The 1928 United States presidential election in Washington took place on November 6, 1928, as part of the 1928 United States presidential election. Washington's voters selected seven voters to the Electoral College, who voted for president and vice president.

With the economy growing very rapidly, and the scandals of the earlier decade such as the Teapot Dome scandal essentially removed from the public's mind at the time, the Republican Party was at the peak of its power. Incumbent President Calvin Coolidge could not be persuaded to run for a second full term, but to compensate for this the Democratic Party – with many prominent members like Franklin Delano Roosevelt and William Gibbs McAdoo refusing to run because they believed the party had no hope of winning – nominated Al Smith, a devout Catholic, anti-Prohibition, and associated with the corrupt Tammany Hall political machine of his native New York.

The powerful anti-Catholicism of Washington state, which was largely settled by Scandinavian Lutherans and Yankees in the west, and Methodists/Evangelicals from the Great Plains in the east, meant that the large progressive third-party vote for Parley Christensen and Robert La Follette from the previous two elections was mainly turned over to Hoover, although La Follette when he died in 1925 had endorsed Smith. Minus significant third-party candidates Smith did triple the Democratic vote from the exceptionally low level of 1924, but Hoover increased the Republican proportion by fifteen percent – half the La Follette vote – as Smith could not carry the strongly unionized and socially progressive counties west of the Cascades.

Consequently, Hoover was able to carry Washington by 36 percentage points in the first two-party contest in three elections. With 67.06% of the popular vote, Washington would prove to be Hoover's fourth strongest state after Kansas, Michigan and Maine. Only in 1904 has Washington State been so Republican relative to the nation as a whole, and then there was a sizable Socialist vote (though less powerful than the third-party votes of 1920 and 1924) for Eugene Debs. Smith did nonetheless carry Ferry County, the first time since 1916 the Democratic Party had won any county in Washington – and indeed along with five counties in California (Note: Amador, El Dorado, Placer, Plumas and San Francisco Counties) the first Democratic wins since that election in any county within the three Pacific States of Washington, Oregon and California.

Until Donald Trump in 2016, Hoover was the last Republican to capture heavily unionized Grays Harbor County, which he did by a large 34 percent margin. He was also the last Republican to win a majority in this county until Trump in 2020. Hoover also won adjacent Pacific County by 36 percent, whereas only Dwight D. Eisenhower in 1952 managed to subsequently win Pacific County for the GOP until Trump in 2016. Kitsap, Snohomish and Wahkiakum Counties would not vote Republican again until 1972. As of the 2024 presidential election, this is the last occasion when Washington voted more Republican than Colorado, Idaho, Indiana or Wyoming.

== Results ==
General Election Results
Party	Pledged to	Elector	Votes
Republican Party	Herbert Hoover	J. C. Scott	335,844
Republican Party	Herbert Hoover	Victor Zednick	335,503
Republican Party	Herbert Hoover	H. T. Wanamaker	335,183
Republican Party	Herbert Hoover	Dayton B. Garrison	335,116
Republican Party	Herbert Hoover	O. H. Woody	334,884
Republican Party	Herbert Hoover	Richard M. Butte	334,738
Republican Party	Herbert Hoover	Edward C. Finch	334,380
Democratic Party	Alfred E. Smith	D. F. Stanley	156,772
Democratic Party	Alfred E. Smith	J. A. Scotland	156,428
Democratic Party	Alfred E. Smith	Ione K. Humes	156,421
Democratic Party	Alfred E. Smith	Edith Dolan Riley	156,367
Democratic Party	Alfred E. Smith	Judson Shorett	156,360
Democratic Party	Alfred E. Smith	Charles M. O'Brien	156,180
Democratic Party	Alfred E. Smith	E. M. Starrett	155,514
Socialist Labor Party	Verne L. Reynolds	Abraham L. Brearcliff	4,068
Socialist Labor Party	Verne L. Reynolds	Daniel L. Barnett	3,965
Socialist Labor Party	Verne L. Reynolds	Frederkke Bolette Eiene	3,961
Socialist Labor Party	Verne L. Reynolds	Henry Genies	3,944
Socialist Labor Party	Verne L. Reynolds	Kolo Kristoff	3,912
Socialist Labor Party	Verne L. Reynolds	John C. Schafer	3,904
Socialist Labor Party	Verne L. Reynolds	Samuel A. Witherspoon	3,844
Socialist Party	Norman M. Thomas	George Hanson	2,615
Socialist Party	Norman M. Thomas	James Lund	2,543
Socialist Party	Norman M. Thomas	T. J. McKinley	2,524
Socialist Party	Norman M. Thomas	F. X. Hall	2,522
Socialist Party	Norman M. Thomas	C. E. Forslund	2,520
Socialist Party	Norman M. Thomas	William Koch	2,498
Socialist Party	Norman M. Thomas	James P. Grim	2,494
Workers Party	William Z. Foster	Charles Smith	1,541
Workers Party	William Z. Foster	John Davis	1,091
Workers Party	William Z. Foster	W. E. Elbe	1,083
Workers Party	William Z. Foster	D. G. O'Hanrahan	1,072
Workers Party	William Z. Foster	W. Spohr	1,051
Workers Party	William Z. Foster	August Salo	1,046
Workers Party	William Z. Foster	Bessie Margolis	1,041
Votes cast (Note: Based on totals for highest elector on each ticket)			500,840

=== Results by county ===
County	Herbert Hoover Republican		Al Smith Democratic		Verne L. Reynolds Socialist Labor		Norman M. Thomas Socialist		William Z. Foster Workers		Margin		Total votes cast
County	#	%	#	%	#	%	#	%	#	%	#	%	Total votes cast
Adams	1,473	64.07%	807	35.10%	5	0.22%	9	0.39%	5	0.22%	666	28.97%	2,299
Asotin	1,812	69.37%	776	29.71%	10	0.38%	11	0.42%	3	0.11%	1,036	39.66%	2,612
Benton	2,650	69.94%	1,080	28.50%	20	0.53%	34	0.90%	5	0.13%	1,570	41.44%	3,789
Chelan	7,672	77.07%	2,239	22.49%	14	0.14%	24	0.24%	5	0.05%	5,433	54.58%	9,954
Clallam	3,319	65.53%	1,705	33.66%	13	0.26%	18	0.36%	10	0.20%	1,614	31.87%	5,065
Clark	7,786	62.58%	4,467	35.90%	59	0.47%	85	0.68%	45	0.36%	3,319	26.68%	12,442
Columbia	1,328	65.07%	689	33.76%	6	0.29%	14	0.69%	4	0.20%	639	31.31%	2,041
Cowlitz	5,882	68.76%	2,581	30.17%	18	0.21%	42	0.49%	31	0.36%	3,301	38.59%	8,554
Douglas	1,760	66.34%	862	32.49%	14	0.53%	15	0.57%	2	0.08%	898	33.85%	2,653
Ferry	640	45.75%	732	52.32%	9	0.64%	16	1.14%	2	0.14%	-92	-6.57%	1,399
Franklin	1,339	61.96%	799	36.97%	9	0.42%	12	0.56%	2	0.09%	540	24.99%	2,161
Garfield	1,004	70.60%	412	28.97%	5	0.35%	0	0.00%	1	0.07%	592	41.63%	1,422
Grant	1,407	68.07%	641	31.01%	2	0.10%	13	0.63%	4	0.19%	766	37.06%	2,067
Grays Harbor	10,798	66.30%	5,258	32.29%	51	0.31%	79	0.49%	100	0.61%	5,540	34.01%	16,286
Island	1,487	71.25%	556	26.64%	10	0.48%	27	1.29%	7	0.34%	931	44.61%	2,087
Jefferson	1,472	63.83%	810	35.13%	4	0.17%	14	0.61%	6	0.26%	662	28.70%	2,306
King	96,263	65.63%	46,604	31.77%	2,336	1.59%	811	0.55%	664	0.45%	49,659	33.86%	146,678
Kitsap	6,544	62.97%	3,668	35.30%	60	0.58%	77	0.74%	43	0.41%	2,876	27.67%	10,392
Kittitas	3,207	59.48%	2,136	39.61%	7	0.13%	25	0.46%	17	0.32%	1,071	19.87%	5,392
Klickitat	1,936	65.43%	975	32.95%	15	0.51%	25	0.84%	8	0.27%	961	32.48%	2,959
Lewis	9,253	71.12%	3,591	27.60%	50	0.38%	79	0.61%	37	0.28%	5,662	43.52%	13,010
Lincoln	2,718	59.62%	1,807	39.64%	14	0.31%	15	0.33%	5	0.11%	911	19.98%	4,559
Mason	1,745	62.95%	992	35.79%	10	0.36%	21	0.76%	4	0.14%	753	27.16%	2,772
Okanogan	3,245	64.86%	1,722	34.42%	12	0.24%	17	0.34%	7	0.14%	1,523	30.44%	5,003
Pacific	3,247	67.41%	1,523	31.62%	7	0.15%	12	0.25%	28	0.58%	1,724	35.79%	4,817
Pend Oreille	1,206	59.58%	793	39.18%	11	0.54%	14	0.69%	0	0.00%	413	20.40%	2,024
Pierce	35,748	66.02%	17,402	32.14%	479	0.88%	313	0.58%	204	0.38%	18,346	33.88%	54,146
San Juan	814	66.72%	400	32.79%	2	0.16%	3	0.25%	1	0.08%	414	33.93%	1,220
Skagit	8,336	73.58%	2,848	25.14%	36	0.32%	59	0.52%	50	0.44%	5,488	48.44%	11,329
Skamania	631	55.99%	473	41.97%	5	0.44%	15	1.33%	3	0.27%	158	14.02%	1,127
Snohomish	16,516	67.39%	7,419	30.27%	325	1.33%	169	0.69%	78	0.32%	9,097	37.12%	24,507
Spokane	35,858	65.48%	18,527	33.83%	157	0.29%	169	0.31%	47	0.09%	17,331	31.65%	54,758
Stevens	3,813	63.05%	2,147	35.50%	23	0.38%	43	0.71%	22	0.36%	1,666	27.55%	6,048
Thurston	7,203	69.59%	3,013	29.11%	29	0.28%	79	0.76%	27	0.26%	4,190	40.48%	10,351
Wahkiakum	578	59.28%	382	39.18%	6	0.62%	8	0.82%	1	0.10%	196	20.10%	975
Walla Walla	6,774	70.08%	2,859	29.58%	14	0.14%	17	0.18%	2	0.02%	3,915	40.50%	9,666
Whatcom	14,621	76.87%	4,100	21.56%	149	0.78%	120	0.63%	31	0.16%	10,521	55.31%	19,021
Whitman	7,065	69.94%	2,969	29.39%	27	0.27%	35	0.35%	5	0.05%	4,096	40.55%	10,101
Yakima	16,694	73.07%	6,008	26.30%	45	0.20%	76	0.33%	25	0.11%	10,686	46.77%	22,848
Totals	335,844	67.06%	156,772	31.30%	4,068	0.81%	2,615	0.52%	1,541	0.31%	179,072	35.76%	500,840

==== Counties that flipped from Progressive to Republican ====
- Adams
- Franklin
- Grant
- Kitsap

==== Counties that flipped from Progressive to Democratic ====
- Ferry

== See also ==
- United States presidential elections in Washington (state)
- Presidency of Herbert Hoover
