= Penrith =

Penrith may refer to:

== Australia ==
- Penrith, New South Wales, a satellite city of Sydney, Australia
  - Penrith Stadium, home ground of the Penrith Panthers
  - Penrith Bears, ice-hockey team
  - City of Penrith, local government area
  - Electoral district of Penrith, for the Legislative Assembly of New South Wales
  - Penrith railway station, Sydney

== United Kingdom ==
- Penrith, Cumbria, a market town in North West England
  - Penrith and Solway (UK Parliament constituency), a UK constituency from 2024
  - Penrith and The Border (UK Parliament constituency), from 1950 to 2024
  - Penrith and Cockermouth (UK Parliament constituency), from 1918 to 1950
  - Penrith (UK Parliament constituency), from 1885 to 1918
  - Penrith railway station
  - Penrith Building Society, a financial institution in Cumbria, England
  - Penrith A.F.C., a football club in Penrith, Cumbria
- Penrydd, a former parish in Wales, also spelled Penrith

== Elsewhere ==
- Penrith, Washington, a community in the United States
