= Wahkiakum County, Washington =

County in Washington, United States

- County
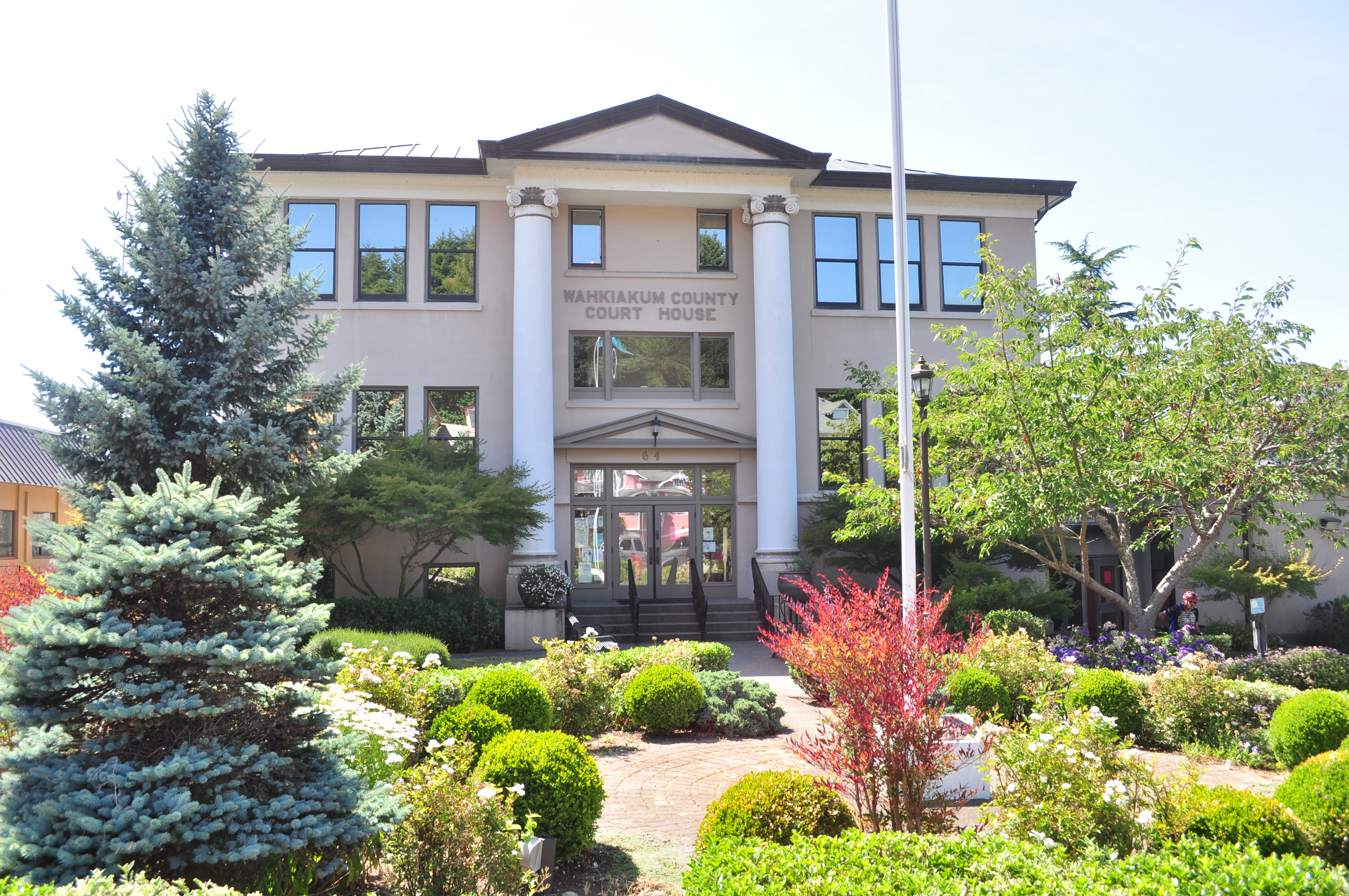
- Wahkiakum County Courthouse in Cathlamet

- Location within the U.S. state of Washington
- Coordinates: 46°17′N 123°26′W
- Country: United States
- State: Washington
- Founded: April 24, 1854
- Named for: Chief Wahkiakum
- Seat: Cathlamet
- Largest town: Puget Island

Area
  - Total: 287 sq mi (740 km^{2})
  - Land: 263 sq mi (680 km^{2})
  - Water: 24 sq mi (62 km^{2}) 8.3%

Population (2020)
  - Total: 4,422
  - Estimate (2025): 4,873 ▲
  - Density: 16.8/sq mi (6.49/km^{2})
- Time zone: UTC−8 (Pacific)
  - Summer (DST): UTC−7 (PDT)
- Congressional district: 3rd
- Website: www.co.wahkiakum.wa.us

Wahkiakum County (/wəˈkaɪ.əkʌm/ wə-KY-ə-kum) is a county located in the U.S. state of Washington. As of the 2020 census, the population was 4,422, making it the third-least populous county in Washington. The county seat and only incorporated town is Cathlamet. The county was formed out of Cowlitz County in April 1854 and is named for Chief Wahkiakum ("Tall Timber") of the Chinook, who is buried in the Pioneer Cemetery in Cathlamet.

The county operates the Wahkiakum County Ferry, which connects Cathlamet to Westport, Oregon, across the Columbia River.

== History ==
The region that became Wahkiakum County was home to the Wahkiakums, one of the Chinookan peoples. Archaeological investigation at Skamokawa indicated that the site, where the inhabitants engaged in fishing, hunting, wood-working, and tool manufacture, was approximately 2,300 years old.

Merchant sea captain Robert Gray, on his Columbia River expedition in 1792, was the first European American known to arrive in the area. During salmon season in the early 1800s, the Hudson's Bay Company's post at Fort George operated a salting station in the region. In 1844, the first trading post was established in the area, near Skamokawa. It was succeeded by Birnie's Retreat, a trading post established in 1846 by James Birnie, who had previously worked for the Hudson's Bay Company. The influence of his wife, Charlotte Beaulieu Birnie, whose parents were a French voyageur and a Kootenay tribe member, helped protect Cathlamet during the Puget Sound War.

Wahkiakum County, with Cathlamet as the county seat, was created by the First Legislative Assembly of the Territory of Washington in 1854.

Early settlers came from Great Britain and the eastern United States until around 1870, when they were followed by a large number of immigrants from Sweden, Norway, Finland, and Dalmatia. From 1870 to the early 1900s, there was a large population of Chinese residents who worked in the fish canneries. The total population in 1912 was 5,283. Lacking roads, travel between early communities was by foot or by boat. Numerous areas of population disappeared in the years after roads began to replace water transportation.

Settlers engaged in fishing, logging, farming, and trading. Salmon canning began in 1866, quickly followed by the establishment of multiple canneries. In 1872, Chinese laborers were brought in to work in the canneries. Salmon canning over the years was impacted by overfishing and habitat degradation, with declines observed by 1889. The last salmon pack in Wahkiakum County took place in 1947.

As a densely wooded region, Wahkiakum County was an abundant source for logging companies. Logs were easily transported by water, although that transport relied on seasonal changes in freshets. When timber nearest the water had been felled, loggers had to rely on oxen, and then on railroads. The first logging train began operating in 1892, established by Simon Benson.

Many trees were also felled by immigrants to clear land for farming. By 1912, there were approximately 140 farms in the region, primarily dairy farms. The first cooperative creamery on the west coast was organized in 1898 in Skamokawa. The first chapter in Wahkiakum County of the National Grange of the Order of Patrons of Husbandry was organized in 1901.

The earliest periodicals in the area included the Cathlamet Gazette (1889), the Skamokawa Eagle (1891) which continues to be the county's official newspaper, and the Timberman (1899).

== Geography ==
According to the United States Census Bureau, the county has a total area of 287 square miles (740 km^{2}), of which 263 square miles (680 km^{2}) is land and 24 square miles (62 km^{2}) (8.3%) is water. It is the smallest county of Washington by total area and the third-smallest by land area, after San Juan County and Island County, which are mostly water by area.

=== Geographic features ===
- Columbia River
- Elochoman River
- Grays River
- Puget Island

=== State highways ===
- State Route 4
- State Route 409

=== Adjacent counties ===
- Pacific County – northwest
- Lewis County – north/northeast
- Cowlitz County – east/southeast
- Columbia County, Oregon – south/southeast
- Clatsop County, Oregon – south/southwest

=== National protected area ===
- Julia Butler Hansen National Wildlife Refuge (part)

== Demographics ==
Historical population
Census	Pop.	Note	%±
1860	42		—
1870	270		542.9%
1880	1,598		491.9%
1890	2,526		58.1%
1900	2,819		11.6%
1910	3,285		16.5%
1920	3,472		5.7%
1930	3,862		11.2%
1940	4,286		11.0%
1950	3,835		−10.5%
1960	3,426		−10.7%
1970	3,592		4.8%
1980	3,832		6.7%
1990	3,327		−13.2%
2000	3,824		14.9%
2010	3,978		4.0%
2020	4,422		11.2%
2025 (est.)	4,873	▲	10.2%
U.S. Decennial Census; 1790–1960 1900–1990; 1990–2000 2010–2020

As of the 2020 census, Wahkiakum County has one of the lowest population of any county in Washington state. Its population of 4,422 is 0.2% the size of the population of Washington's largest county, King.

The county has the second highest divorce rate of any Washington county, behind Lincoln County.

=== 2020 census ===
As of the 2020 census, the county had a population of 4,422. Of the residents, 17.3% were under the age of 18 and 31.7% were 65 years of age or older; the median age was 53.4 years. For every 100 females there were 98.7 males, and for every 100 females age 18 and over there were 97.9 males. 0.0% of residents lived in urban areas and 100.0% lived in rural areas.

Wahkiakum County, Washington – Racial and ethnic composition Note: the US Census treats Hispanic/Latino as an ethnic category. This table excludes Latinos from the racial categories and assigns them to a separate category. Hispanics/Latinos may be of any race.
Race / Ethnicity (NH = Non-Hispanic)	Pop 2000	Pop 2010	Pop 2020	% 2000	% 2010	% 2020
White alone (NH)	3,546	3,678	3,817	92.73%	92.46%	86.32%
Black or African American alone (NH)	9	8	21	0.24%	0.20%	0.47%
Native American or Alaska Native alone (NH)	60	48	55	1.57%	1.21%	1.24%
Asian alone (NH)	18	22	43	0.47%	0.55%	0.97%
Pacific Islander alone (NH)	3	6	2	0.08%	0.15%	0.05%
Other race alone (NH)	0	4	24	0.00%	0.10%	0.54%
Mixed race or Multiracial (NH)	90	104	277	2.35%	2.61%	6.26%
Hispanic or Latino (any race)	98	108	183	2.56%	2.72%	4.14%
Total	3,824	3,978	4,422	100.00%	100.00%	100.00%

The racial makeup of the county was 87.8% White, 0.5% Black or African American, 1.4% American Indian and Alaska Native, 1.0% Asian, 0.1% Native Hawaiian and Pacific Islander, 1.2% from some other race, and 8.0% from two or more races. Hispanic or Latino residents of any race comprised 4.1% of the population.

There were 1,884 households in the county, of which 22.9% had children under the age of 18 living with them and 21.2% had a female householder with no spouse or partner present. About 25.6% of all households were made up of individuals and 15.5% had someone living alone who was 65 years of age or older.

There were 2,189 housing units, of which 13.9% were vacant. Among occupied housing units, 81.7% were owner-occupied and 18.3% were renter-occupied. The homeowner vacancy rate was 1.7% and the rental vacancy rate was 5.7%.

=== 2010 census ===
As of the 2010 census, there were 3,978 people, 1,737 households, and 1,187 families living in the county. The population density was 15.1 people per square mile (5.8 people/km^{2}). There were 2,067 housing units at an average density of 7.8 units per square mile (3.0 units/km^{2}). The racial makeup of the county was 94.0% white, 1.3% American Indian, 0.6% Asian, 0.3% black or African American, 0.2% Pacific islander, 0.7% from other races, and 3.1% from two or more races. Those of Hispanic or Latino origin made up 2.7% of the population. In terms of ancestry, 19.8% were Norwegian, 19.3% were German, 13.3% were English, 9.6% were American, 8.5% were Swedish, and 6.8% were Irish.

Of the 1,737 households, 21.9% had children under the age of 18 living with them, 57.2% were married couples living together, 6.2% had a female householder with no husband present, 31.7% were non-families, and 26.8% of all households were made up of individuals. The average household size was 2.26 and the average family size was 2.69. The median age was 52.3 years.

The median income for a household in the county was $40,372 and the median income for a family was $47,266. Males had a median income of $44,779 versus $36,111 for females. The per capita income for the county was $23,115. About 7.1% of families and 12.2% of the population were below the poverty line, including 14.5% of those under age 18 and 10.7% of those age 65 or over.

=== 2000 census ===
As of the 2000 census, there were 3,824 people, 1,553 households, and 1,108 families living in the county. The population density was 14 people per square mile (5.4 people/km^{2}). There were 1,792 housing units at an average density of 7 units per square mile (2.7 units/km^{2}). The racial makeup of the county was 93.46% White, 0.26% Black or African American, 1.57% Native American, 0.47% Asian, 0.08% Pacific Islander, 1.65% from other races, and 2.51% from two or more races. 2.56% of the population were Hispanic or Latino of any race. 18.7% were of German, 13.1% Norwegian, 10.6% United States or American, 9.1% English, 7.7% Irish, 6.5% Swedish, and 5.9% Finnish ancestry. 96.7% spoke English and 2.5% Spanish as a first language.

There were 1,553 households, out of which 26.90% had children under the age of 18 living with them, 61.40% were married couples living together, 6.30% had a female householder with no husband present, and 28.60% were non-families. 24.40% of all households were made up of individuals, and 10.60% had someone living alone who was 65 years of age or older. The average household size was 2.42 and the average family size was 2.83.

In the county, the population was spread out, with 23.40% under the age of 18, 5.30% from 18 to 24, 22.20% from 25 to 44, 30.60% from 45 to 64, and 18.50% who were 65 years of age or older. The median age was 44 years. For every 100 females there were 100.10 males. For every 100 females age 18 and over, there were 98.10 males.

The median income for a household in the county was $39,444, and the median income for a family was $47,604. Males had a median income of $37,123 versus $27,938 for females. The per capita income for the county was $19,063. About 5.90% of families and 8.10% of the population were below the poverty line, including 11.00% of those under age 18 and 2.70% of those age 65 or over.

== Politics ==
United States presidential election results for Wahkiakum County, Washington
Year	Republican		Democratic		Third party(ies)	
Year	No.	%	No.	%	No.	%
1892	239	46.23%	225	43.52%	53	10.25%
1896	290	42.09%	396	57.47%	3	0.44%
1900	396	61.78%	207	32.29%	38	5.93%
1904	473	72.88%	101	15.56%	75	11.56%
1908	485	70.80%	150	21.90%	50	7.30%
1912	282	31.90%	185	20.93%	417	47.17%
1916	490	52.07%	340	36.13%	111	11.80%
1920	494	57.64%	164	19.14%	199	23.22%
1924	496	60.49%	89	10.85%	235	28.66%
1928	578	59.28%	382	39.18%	15	1.54%
1932	442	32.40%	730	53.52%	192	14.08%
1936	419	26.47%	1,098	69.36%	66	4.17%
1940	642	35.18%	1,164	63.78%	19	1.04%
1944	532	34.43%	1,003	64.92%	10	0.65%
1948	622	38.95%	877	54.92%	98	6.14%
1952	815	46.31%	928	52.73%	17	0.97%
1956	808	45.73%	953	53.93%	6	0.34%
1960	796	46.23%	923	53.60%	3	0.17%
1964	446	27.46%	1,175	72.35%	3	0.18%
1968	641	38.27%	899	53.67%	135	8.06%
1972	818	47.39%	796	46.12%	112	6.49%
1976	704	41.17%	942	55.09%	64	3.74%
1980	828	46.57%	751	42.24%	199	11.19%
1984	776	44.62%	930	53.48%	33	1.90%
1988	629	38.68%	961	59.10%	36	2.21%
1992	488	27.17%	696	38.75%	612	34.08%
1996	619	33.71%	924	50.33%	293	15.96%
2000	1,033	52.36%	803	40.70%	137	6.94%
2004	1,171	52.39%	1,021	45.68%	43	1.92%
2008	1,105	48.17%	1,121	48.87%	68	2.96%
2012	1,119	48.78%	1,094	47.69%	81	3.53%
2016	1,344	55.33%	832	34.25%	253	10.42%
2020	1,741	58.40%	1,165	39.08%	75	2.52%
2024	1,757	57.38%	1,204	39.32%	101	3.30%

In the 2016 Presidential election, Donald Trump won the county over Hillary Clinton by a decisive margin – 55.3% to 34.3%. It is generally a swing county in presidential elections. From 1932 to 1996, it voted Democratic all but twice, but since 2000 it has voted Republican all but once.

== Communities ==
=== Town ===
- Cathlamet (county seat)

=== Census-designated places ===
- Altoona
- Deep River
- East Cathlamet
- Grays River
- Lower Elochoman
- Puget Island
- Rosburg
- Skamokawa Valley
- Upper Elochoman

=== Unincorporated communities ===
- Brookfield
- Eagle Cliff
- Flandersville
- Skamokawa
- Waterford

== Notable residents ==
- Krist Novoselic, former bass player of the Seattle grunge band Nirvana
- Robert Michael Pyle, lepidopterist and author
- Hadley Caliman, jazz musician

== See also ==
- National Register of Historic Places listings in Wahkiakum County, Washington
