= Lower Elochoman, Washington =

- CDP
- Interactive map of Lower Elochoman, Washington
- Coordinates: 46°13′04″N 123°22′31″W
- Country: United States
- State: Washington
- County: Wahkiakum
- Elevation: 118 ft (36 m)

Population (2020)
  - Total: 275
- Time zone: UTC-8 (Pacific (PST))
  - Summer (DST): UTC-7 (PDT)
- ZIP Code: 98612
- Area code: 360, 564
- GNIS feature ID: 2585000

Lower Elochoman is a census-designated place (CDP) in Wahkiakum County, Washington, United States. As of the 2020 census, Lower Elochoman had a population of 275.

== Demographics ==
Historical population
Census	Pop.	Note	%±
2010	185		—
2020	275		48.6%
U.S. Decennial Census; 2000 2010

Lower Elochoman first appeared as a census designated place in the 2010 U.S. census.

=== Racial and ethnic composition ===
Lower Elochoman CDP, Washington – Racial and ethnic composition Note: the US Census treats Hispanic/Latino as an ethnic category. This table excludes Latinos from the racial categories and assigns them to a separate category. Hispanics/Latinos may be of any race.
Race / Ethnicity (NH = Non-Hispanic)	Pop 2010	Pop 2020	% 2010	% 2020
White alone (NH)	176	231	95.14%	84.00%
Black or African American alone (NH)	0	2	0.00%	0.73%
Native American or Alaska Native alone (NH)	2	1	1.08%	0.36%
Asian alone (NH)	1	2	0.54%	0.73%
Native Hawaiian or Pacific Islander alone (NH)	0	0	0.00%	0.00%
Other race alone (NH)	0	0	0.00%	0.00%
Mixed race or Multiracial (NH)	4	22	2.16%	8.00%
Hispanic or Latino (any race)	2	17	1.08%	6.18%
Total	185	275	100.00%	100.00%
