= Dalkena, Washington =

Unincorporated community in Pend Oreille County, Washington, United States

- Unincorporated community
- Location of Dalkena, Washington
- Coordinates: 48°14′42″N 117°14′16″W
- Country: United States
- State: Washington
- County: Pend Oreille
- Established: 1903
- Time zone: UTC-8 (Pacific (PST))
  - Summer (DST): UTC-7 (PDT)
- Area code: 509

Dalkena is an unincorporated community in Pend Oreille County, in the U.S. state of Washington.

== History ==
Dalkena had its start in the late 1800s when a sawmill opened at the site. The community's name is an amalgamation of Dalton and Kennedy, the proprietors of the mill. A post office called Dalkena was established in 1903, and remained in operation until 1942.
