= Blueslide, Washington =

Unincorporated community in Pend Oreille County, Washington, United States

- Unincorporated community
- Location of Blueslide, Washington
- Coordinates: 48°33′23″N 117°20′45″W
- Country: United States
- State: Washington
- County: Pend Oreille
- Established: 1906
- Time zone: UTC-8 (Pacific (PST))
  - Summer (DST): UTC-7 (PDT)
- Area code: 509

Blueslide is an unincorporated community in Pend Oreille County, in the U.S. state of Washington.

== History ==
A post office called Blueslide was established in 1906, and remained in operation until 1926. The community was named for a landslide near the town site.
