= Flandersville, Washington =

Unincorporated community in Washington, United States

- Unincorporated community
- Location within Washington (state) Location within the United States
- Country: United States
- State: Washington
- County: Lewis
- Elevation: 46 ft (14 m)
- Time zone: UTC-8 (Pacific (PST))
  - Summer (DST): UTC-7 (PDT)
- GNIS feature ID: 1509917

Flandersville, also known as Little Cape Horn, is an unincorporated community in Wahkiakum County, Washington. It is located on the Columbia River six miles east of Cathlamet and twenty miles west of Longview.

The area later known as Flandersville was settled in the nineteenth century by the Polworth family, who established a fish trapping and salting business. Other families moved to the area in the twentieth century, and in the 1960s the community was informally named Flandersville for resident Bill Flanders.

Flandersville is the site of a Tuscan-style bed and breakfast and a few residences. Many residents prefer the name Little Cape Horn over Flandersville, and proposals to officially change the name of the community have been raised over the years.
