= Jared, Washington =

Unincorporated community in Pend Oreille County, Washington, United States

- Unincorporated community
- Location of Jared, Washington
- Coordinates: 48°28′09″N 117°18′56″W
- Country: United States
- State: Washington
- County: Pend Oreille
- Established: 1909
- Time zone: UTC-8 (Pacific (PST))
  - Summer (DST): UTC-7 (PDT)
- Area code: 509

Jared is an unincorporated community in Pend Oreille County, in the U.S. state of Washington.

== History ==
A post office called Jared was established in 1909, and remained in operation until 1943. The community was named after R. P. Jared, a local merchant.
