= Upper Elochoman, Washington =

- CDP
- Location within Washington (state)
- Coordinates: 46°14′45″N 123°19′08″W
- Country: United States
- State: Washington
- County: Wahkiakum
- Elevation: 102 ft (31 m)

Population (2010)
  - Total: 193
- Time zone: UTC-8 (Pacific (PST))
  - Summer (DST): UTC-7 (PDT)
- ZIP Code: 98612
- Area code: 360, 564
- GNIS feature ID: 2585048

Upper Elochoman is a census-designated place (CDP) in Wahkiakum County, Washington, United States. As of the 2020 census, Upper Elochoman had a population of 178. The CDP includes the State Camp community.

== Demographics ==
Historical population
Census	Pop.	Note	%±
2010	193		—
2020	178		−7.8%
U.S. Decennial Census; 2000 2010

Upper Elochoman first appeared as a census designated place in the 2010 U.S. census.

=== Racial and ethnic composition ===
Upper Elochoman CDP, Washington – Racial and ethnic composition Note: the US Census treats Hispanic/Latino as an ethnic category. This table excludes Latinos from the racial categories and assigns them to a separate category. Hispanics/Latinos may be of any race.
Race / Ethnicity (NH = Non-Hispanic)	Pop 2010	Pop 2020	% 2010	% 2020
White alone (NH)	184	155	95.34%	87.08%
Black or African American alone (NH)	0	0	0.00%	0.00%
Native American or Alaska Native alone (NH)	5	0	2.59%	0.00%
Asian alone (NH)	0	1	0.00%	0.56%
Native Hawaiian or Pacific Islander alone (NH)	0	0	0.00%	0.00%
Other race alone (NH)	0	3	0.00%	1.69%
Mixed race or Multiracial (NH)	0	9	0.00%	5.06%
Hispanic or Latino (any race)	4	10	2.07%	5.62%
Total	193	178	100.00%	100.00%
