= Camden, Washington =

- Unincorporated community
- Interactive map of Camden, Washington
- Coordinates: 48°2′50.63″N 117°14′23.77″W
- Country: United States
- State: Washington
- County: Pend Oreille
- Time zone: UTC-8 (Pacific (PST))
  - Summer (DST): UTC-7 (PDT)
- Area code: 509

Camden is an unincorporated community in Pend Oreille County, in the U.S. state of Washington.

== History ==
A post office called Camden was established in 1892, and remained in operation until 1954.
