= Pend Oreille County, Washington =

County in Washington, United States

- County
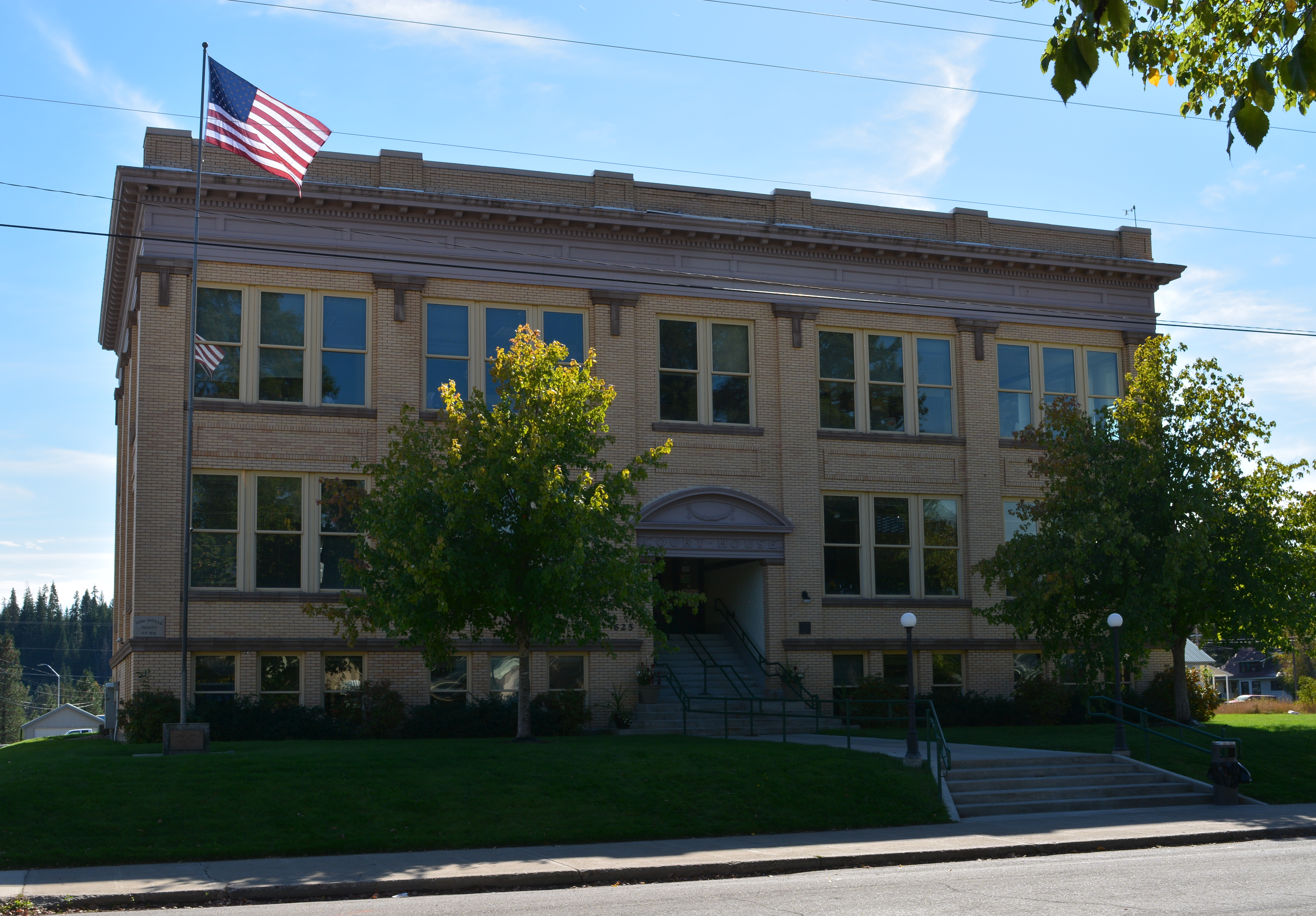
- Pend Oreille County Courthouse (September 2014)

- Flag Seal

- Location within the U.S. state of Washington
- Coordinates: 48°32′38″N 117°13′56″W
- Country: United States
- State: Washington
- Founded: March 1, 1911
- Named for: Pend d'Oreilles people
- Seat: Newport
- Largest city: Newport

Area
  - Total: 1,425 sq mi (3,690 km^{2})
  - Land: 1,400 sq mi (3,600 km^{2})
  - Water: 25 sq mi (65 km^{2}) 1.8%

Population (2020)
  - Total: 13,401
  - Estimate (2025): 14,457 ▲
  - Density: 9.3/sq mi (3.6/km^{2})
- Time zone: UTC−8 (Pacific)
  - Summer (DST): UTC−7 (PDT)
- Congressional district: 5th
- Website: pendoreille.gov

Pend Oreille County (/ˌpɒndəˈreɪ/ POND-ə-RAY) is a county located in the northeast corner of the U.S. state of Washington, along the Canada–US border. As of the 2020 census, the population was 13,401. The county seat and largest city is Newport.

The county was created out of Stevens County on March 1, 1911. It is the most recently formed of the state's 39 counties. It is named after the Pend d'Oreilles tribe, who in turn were ostensibly named for large shell earrings that members wore. ("Pend d'oreille", while awkward in French, could be translated as "hangs from the ear".)

== Geography ==
According to the United States Census Bureau, the county has a total area of 1,425 square miles (3,690 km^{2}), of which 1,400 square miles (3,600 km^{2}) is land and 25 square miles (65 km^{2}) (1.8%) is water.

=== Highways ===
- U.S. Route 2
- State Route 20
- State Route 31
- State Route 41
- State Route 211
- International Selkirk Loop

=== Adjacent counties ===
- Boundary County, Idaho – east
- Bonner County, Idaho – east
- Spokane County – south
- Stevens County – west
- Central Kootenay Regional District, British Columbia – north

=== National protected areas ===
- Colville National Forest (part)
- Pacific Northwest National Scenic Trail (part)
- Kaniksu National Forest (part)
- Little Pend Oreille National Wildlife Refuge (part)

== Demographics ==
Historical population
Census	Pop.	Note	%±
1920	6,363		—
1930	7,155		12.4%
1940	7,156		0.0%
1950	7,413		3.6%
1960	6,914		−6.7%
1970	6,025		−12.9%
1980	8,580		42.4%
1990	8,915		3.9%
2000	11,732		31.6%
2010	13,001		10.8%
2020	13,401		3.1%
2025 (est.)	14,457	▲	7.9%
U.S. Decennial Census; 1790–1960 1900–1990; 1990–2000 2010–2020

=== 2020 census ===
As of the 2020 census, the county had a population of 13,401. Of the residents, 18.8% were under the age of 18 and 27.9% were 65 years of age or older; the median age was 51.6 years. For every 100 females there were 103.0 males, and for every 100 females age 18 and over there were 101.3 males. 0.0% of residents lived in urban areas and 100.0% lived in rural areas.

Pend Oreille County, Washington – Racial and ethnic composition Note: the US Census treats Hispanic/Latino as an ethnic category. This table excludes Latinos from the racial categories and assigns them to a separate category. Hispanics/Latinos may be of any race.
Race / Ethnicity (NH = Non-Hispanic)	Pop 2000	Pop 2010	Pop 2020	% 2000	% 2010	% 2020
White alone (NH)	10,821	11,677	11,684	92.23%	89.82%	87.19%
Black or African American alone (NH)	17	50	54	0.14%	0.38%	0.40%
Native American or Alaska Native alone (NH)	324	466	373	2.76%	3.58%	2.78%
Asian alone (NH)	72	73	69	0.61%	0.56%	0.51%
Pacific Islander alone (NH)	23	16	9	0.20%	0.12%	0.07%
Other race alone (NH)	15	24	65	0.13%	0.18%	0.49%
Mixed race or Multiracial (NH)	219	304	699	1.87%	2.34%	5.22%
Hispanic or Latino (any race)	241	391	448	2.05%	3.01%	3.34%
Total	11,732	13,001	13,401	100.00%	100.00%	100.00%

The racial makeup of the county was 88.1% White, 0.4% Black or African American, 3.0% American Indian and Alaska Native, 0.6% Asian, 1.4% from some other race, and 6.5% from two or more races. Hispanic or Latino residents of any race comprised 3.3% of the population.

There were 5,621 households in the county, of which 22.7% had children under the age of 18 living with them and 21.6% had a female householder with no spouse or partner present. About 28.8% of all households were made up of individuals and 14.9% had someone living alone who was 65 years of age or older.

There were 7,938 housing units, of which 29.2% were vacant. Among occupied housing units, 78.8% were owner-occupied and 21.2% were renter-occupied. The homeowner vacancy rate was 1.8% and the rental vacancy rate was 6.3%.

=== 2010 census ===
As of the 2010 census, there were 13,001 people, 5,479 households, and 3,628 families residing in the county. The population density was 9.3 inhabitants per square mile (3.6/km^{2}). There were 7,936 housing units at an average density of 5.7 per square mile (2.2/km^{2}). The racial makeup of the county was 91.6% Caucasian, 3.8% American Indian, 0.6% Asian, 0.4% black or African American, 0.1% Pacific islander, 0.7% from other races, and 2.9% from two or more races. Those of Hispanic or Latino origin made up 3.0% of the population. In terms of ancestry,

Of the 5,479 households, 26.2% had children under the age of 18 living with them, 52.4% were married couples living together, 9.1% had a female householder with no husband present, 33.8% were non-families, and 28.2% of all households were made up of individuals. The average household size was 2.35 and the average family size was 2.84. The median age was 47.8 years.

The median income for a household in the county was $38,896 and the median income for a family was $46,971. Males had a median income of $45,728 versus $26,128 for females. The per capita income for the county was $22,546. About 13.6% of families and 18.3% of the population were below the poverty line, including 25.2% of those under age 18 and 13.3% of those age 65 or over.

=== 2000 census ===
As of the 2000 census, there were 11,732 people, 4,639 households, and 3,261 families in the county. The population density was 8 people per square mile (3.1 people/km^{2}). There were 6,608 housing units at an average density of 5 per square mile (1.9/km^{2}). The racial makeup of the county was 93.53% White, 0.14% Black or African American, 2.88% Native American, 0.63% Asian, 0.20% Pacific Islander, 0.57% from other races, and 2.04% from two or more races. 2.05% of the population were Hispanic or Latino of any race. 21.1% were of German, 13.2% English, 10.2% United States or American, 9,2% Irish and 5.7% Norwegian ancestry.

There were 4,639 households, out of which 29.60% had children under the age of 18 living with them, 57.50% were married couples living together, 8.40% had a female householder with no husband present, and 29.70% were non-families. 25.00% of all households were made up of individuals, and 10.50% had someone living alone who was 65 years of age or older. The average household size was 2.51 and the average family size was 2.98.

The county population contained 26.30% under the age of 18, 5.50% from 18 to 24, 23.80% from 25 to 44, 29.50% from 45 to 64, and 14.90% who were 65 years of age or older. The median age was 42 years. For every 100 females there were 100.50 males. For every 100 females age 18 and over, there were 99.60 males.

The median income for a household in the county was $31,677, and the median income for a family was $36,977. Males had a median income of $36,951 versus $20,693 for females. The per capita income for the county was $15,731. About 13.60% of families and 18.10% of the population were below the poverty line, including 27.60% of those under age 18 and 6.40% of those age 65 or over.

== Communities ==
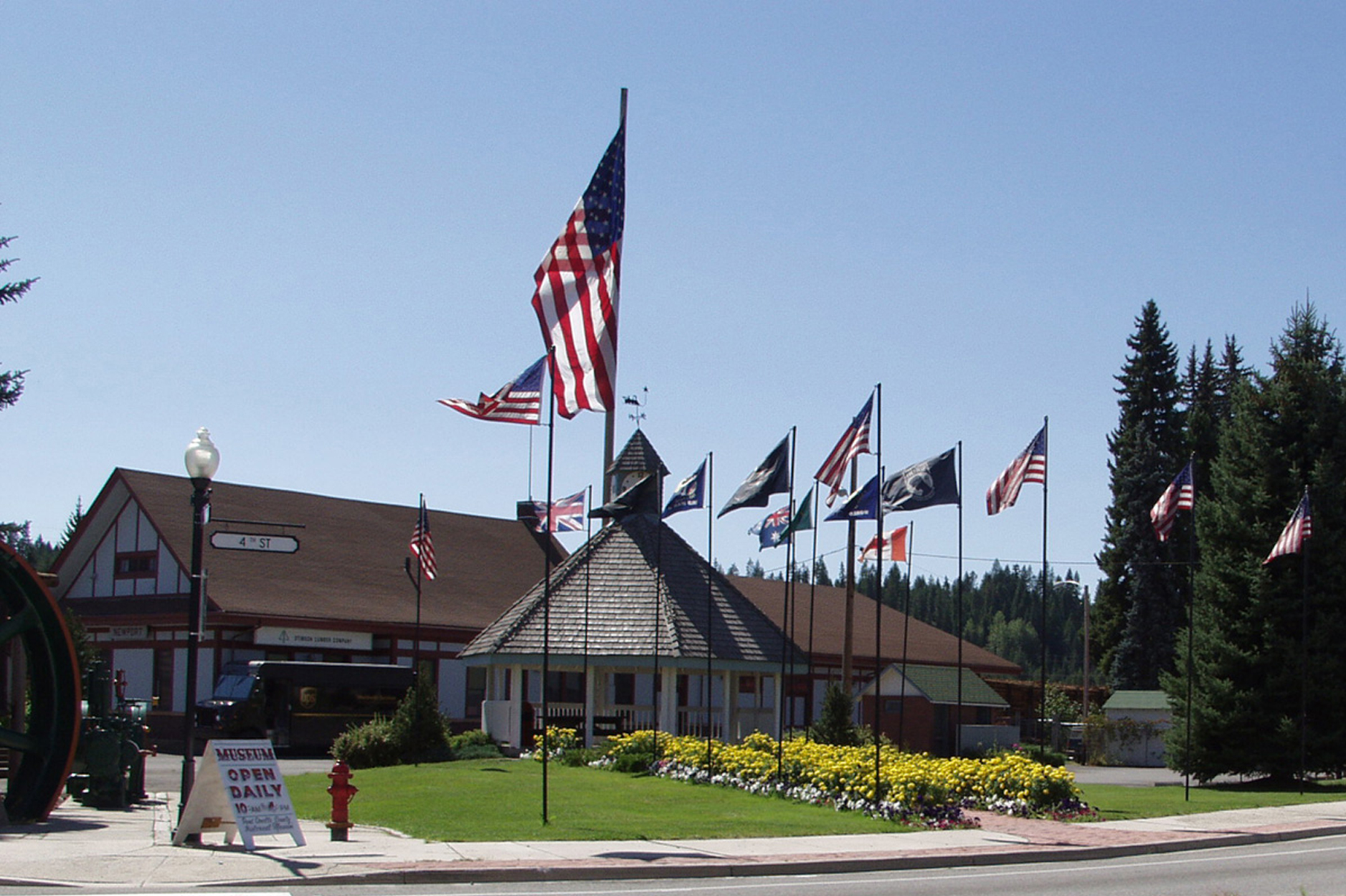
Pend Oreille County Historical Museum, Newport

=== Cities ===
- Newport (county seat)

=== Towns ===
- Cusick
- Ione
- Metaline
- Metaline Falls

=== Unincorporated communities ===
- Blueslide
- Camden
- Dalkena
- Diamond Lake
- Jared
- Penrith
- Ruby
- Sacheen Lake
- Tiger
- Usk

== Politics ==
United States presidential election results for Pend Oreille County, Washington
Year	Republican		Democratic		Third party(ies)	
Year	No.	%	No.	%	No.	%
1912	305	14.57%	747	35.67%	1,042	49.76%
1916	916	43.21%	1,080	50.94%	124	5.85%
1920	1,079	54.30%	651	32.76%	257	12.93%
1924	1,025	51.05%	231	11.50%	752	37.45%
1928	1,206	59.58%	793	39.18%	25	1.24%
1932	855	30.97%	1,772	64.18%	134	4.85%
1936	813	28.28%	1,903	66.19%	159	5.53%
1940	1,268	40.94%	1,812	58.51%	17	0.55%
1944	1,052	42.90%	1,385	56.48%	15	0.61%
1948	1,009	39.31%	1,465	57.07%	93	3.62%
1952	1,566	52.87%	1,380	46.59%	16	0.54%
1956	1,488	49.09%	1,540	50.81%	3	0.10%
1960	1,305	44.19%	1,641	55.57%	7	0.24%
1964	985	33.22%	1,978	66.71%	2	0.07%
1968	1,117	41.16%	1,350	49.74%	247	9.10%
1972	1,746	59.57%	1,071	36.54%	114	3.89%
1976	1,516	47.82%	1,533	48.36%	121	3.82%
1980	2,136	55.70%	1,399	36.48%	300	7.82%
1984	2,374	58.26%	1,655	40.61%	46	1.13%
1988	1,802	47.50%	1,925	50.74%	67	1.77%
1992	1,528	32.40%	1,798	38.13%	1,390	29.47%
1996	2,012	40.27%	2,126	42.55%	858	17.17%
2000	3,076	56.56%	1,973	36.28%	389	7.15%
2004	3,693	59.58%	2,310	37.27%	195	3.15%
2008	3,717	56.73%	2,562	39.10%	273	4.17%
2012	3,952	59.27%	2,508	37.61%	208	3.12%
2016	4,373	62.33%	1,934	27.57%	709	10.11%
2020	5,728	66.97%	2,593	30.32%	232	2.71%
2024	5,826	68.18%	2,461	28.80%	258	3.02%

== In popular culture ==
- The eponymous town in the television series Twin Peaks is described as being "five miles south of the Canadian border, and twelve miles west of the state line", which would place it in Pend Oreille County.

== See also ==
- National Register of Historic Places listings in Pend Oreille County, Washington
