= 1904 United States presidential election in Washington (state) =

- November 8, 1904
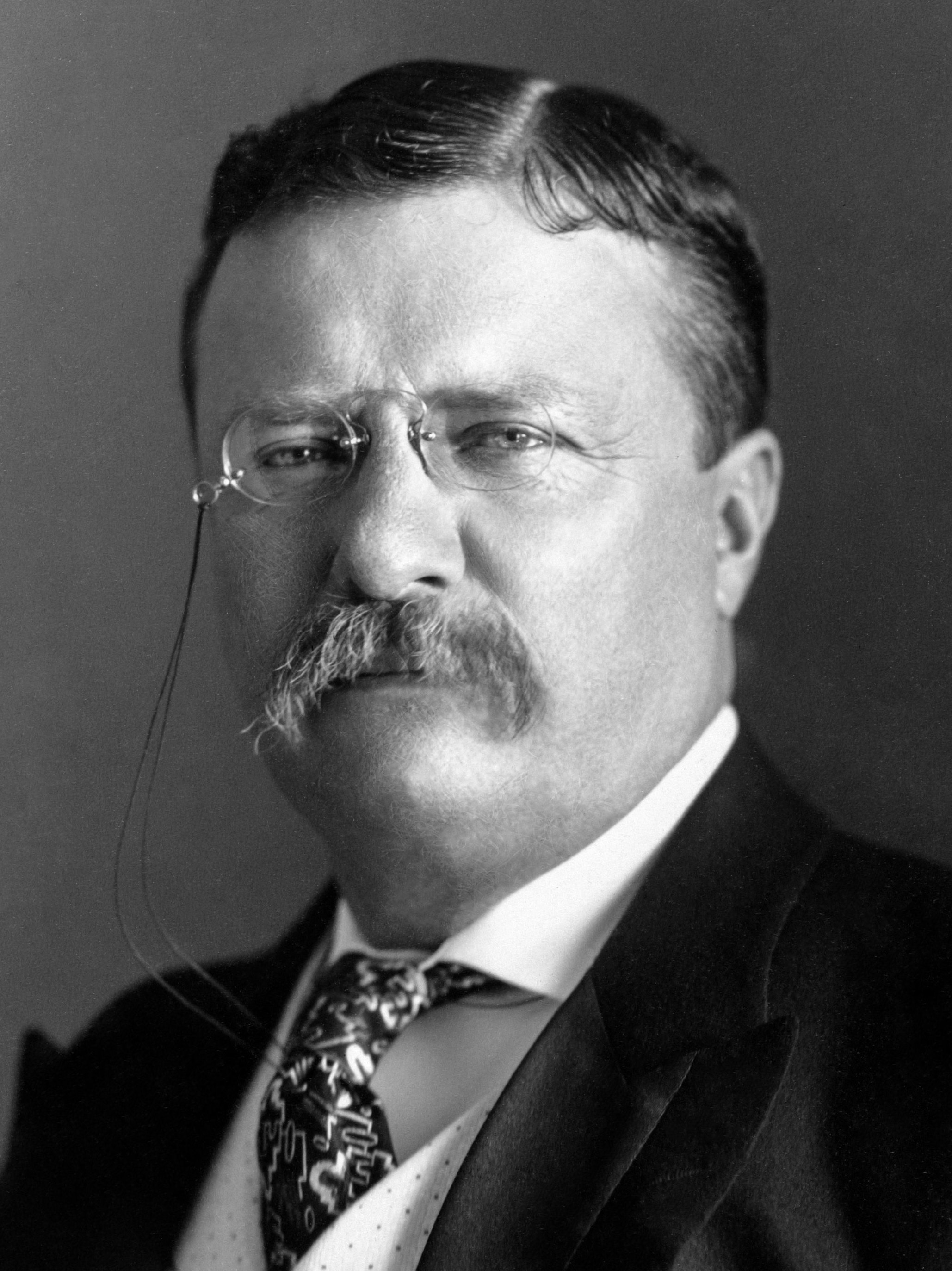

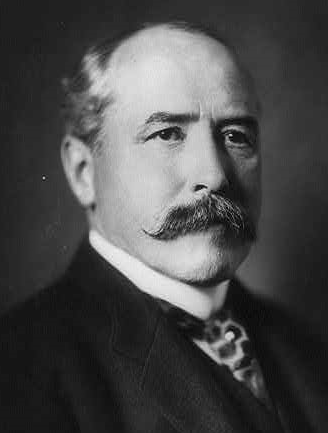

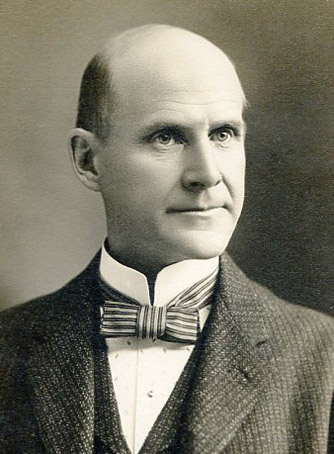
Nominee	Theodore Roosevelt	Alton B. Parker	Eugene V. Debs
Party	Republican	Democratic	Socialist
Home state	New York	New York	Indiana
Running mate	Charles W. Fairbanks	Henry G. Davis	Ben Hanford
Electoral vote	5	0	0
Popular vote	101,540	28,098	10,023
Percentage	69.95%	19.36%	6.91%
County results
Roosevelt
50–60%
60–70%
70–80%
President before election
Theodore Roosevelt
Republican
Elected President
Theodore Roosevelt
Republican

The 1904 United States presidential election in Washington took place on November 8, 1904. All contemporary 45 states were part of the 1904 United States presidential election. Voters chose five electors to the Electoral College, which selected the president and vice president.

This election would solidify the State of Washington as a one-party Republican bastion, which it would remain at a Presidential level apart from the 1910s GOP split until Franklin D. Roosevelt rose to power in 1932, and more or less continuously at state level during this era. Democratic representation in the Washington legislature would during this period at times be countable on one hand, and no Democrat other than Woodrow Wilson in 1916 would henceforth carry even one county in the state before Catholic Al Smith carried German-settled Ferry County in 1928. Republican primaries would take over as the chief mode of political competition when introduced later in the decade.

President Roosevelt was extremely popular in Washington State because of his policies of reforming the railroads, creating a Department of Commerce and Labor and conserving the forest resources that were at the time heavily exploited by big business. Parker's re-emphasis on the Gold Standard, which harked back to Grover Cleveland, aroused no enthusiasm in Washington State. Nor did Parker's opposition to Roosevelt's policy of imperialism in the Pacific, with the result that Roosevelt's performance remains the best ever by any Presidential candidate since Washington's statehood in 1889. Parker did not win one third of the vote in a single county, and overall took just a little over nineteen percent of Washington State's ballots. Roosevelt would win Washington by a landslide margin of 50.59%. In fact, with 69.95% of the popular vote, Washington would be Roosevelt's fifth strongest victory in terms of percentage in the popular vote after Vermont, North Dakota, Minnesota and South Dakota.

Socialist nominee Eugene V. Debs, whose campaign focused on trust-busting and monopoly, received almost three percent of the popular vote nationwide and 6.91% in the state of Washington. In two counties Debs received more votes than the Democratic nominee Alton B. Parker, however Debs was still far below the incumbent President Roosevelt.

== Results ==
General Election Results
Party	Pledged to	Elector	Votes
Republican Party	Theodore Roosevelt	Samuel G. Cosgrove	101,540
Republican Party	Theodore Roosevelt	L. B. Nash	100,797
Republican Party	Theodore Roosevelt	George W. Bassett	100,685
Republican Party	Theodore Roosevelt	Alfred J. Munson	100,623
Republican Party	Theodore Roosevelt	Herman D. Crow	100,449
Democratic Party	Alton B. Parker	Fred Thiel	28,098
Democratic Party	Alton B. Parker	John Trumbull	27,974
Democratic Party	Alton B. Parker	Simon Peter Richardson	27,969
Democratic Party	Alton B. Parker	John J. Carney	27,956
Democratic Party	Alton B. Parker	J. S. Darnell	27,938
Socialist Party	Eugene V. Debs	DeForest Sanford	10,023
Socialist Party	Eugene V. Debs	O. Lund	9,975
Socialist Party	Eugene V. Debs	D. M. Angus	9,971
Socialist Party	Eugene V. Debs	P. R. Pratt	9,955
Socialist Party	Eugene V. Debs	D. G. Crow	9,936
Prohibition Party	Silas C. Swallow	John Ovall	3,229
Prohibition Party	Silas C. Swallow	George P. Silvers	3,207
Prohibition Party	Silas C. Swallow	William Alvin Spalding	3,201
Prohibition Party	Silas C. Swallow	George R. Varney	3,199
Prohibition Party	Silas C. Swallow	Wallace W. Potter	3,189
Socialist Labor Party	Charles H. Corregan	P. Driscoll	1,592
Socialist Labor Party	Charles H. Corregan	A. Sanders	1,546
Socialist Labor Party	Charles H. Corregan	H. Anderson	1,545
Socialist Labor Party	Charles H. Corregan	T. Bernett	1,541
Socialist Labor Party	Charles H. Corregan	G. Rush	1,538
People's Party	Thomas E. Watson	J. G. Wolfe	669
People's Party	Thomas E. Watson	George F. Cotterill	668
People's Party	Thomas E. Watson	W. H. Runner	661
People's Party	Thomas E. Watson	H. Clayson	652
People's Party	Thomas E. Watson	Alexander McDonald	650
Votes cast (Note: Based on totals for highest elector on each ticket)			145,151

=== Results by county ===
County	Theodore Roosevelt Republican		Alton B. Parker Democratic		Eugene V. Debs Socialist		Silas C. Swallow Prohibition		Charles H. Corregan Socialist Labor		Thomas E. Watson Populist		Margin		Total votes cast (Note: Based on highest elector on each ticket)
County	#	%	#	%	#	%	#	%	#	%	#	%	#	%	Total votes cast
Adams	1,138	64.44%	548	31.03%	41	2.32%	30	1.70%	8	0.45%	1	0.06%	590	33.41%	1,766
Asotin	747	72.59%	227	22.06%	31	3.01%	12	1.17%	8	0.78%	4	0.39%	520	50.53%	1,029
Chehalis	2,589	68.13%	624	16.42%	460	12.11%	76	2.00%	39	1.03%	12	0.32%	1,965	51.71%	3,800
Chelan	1,248	72.18%	372	21.52%	49	2.83%	26	1.50%	16	0.93%	18	1.04%	876	50.67%	1,729
Clallam	903	68.15%	273	20.60%	125	9.43%	0	0.00%	14	1.06%	10	0.75%	630	47.55%	1,325
Clarke	2,436	71.88%	515	15.20%	257	7.58%	134	3.95%	24	0.71%	23	0.68%	1,921	56.68%	3,389
Columbia	1,089	65.72%	482	29.09%	37	2.23%	39	2.35%	9	0.54%	1	0.06%	607	36.63%	1,657
Cowlitz	1,589	77.32%	317	15.43%	91	4.43%	40	1.95%	8	0.39%	10	0.49%	1,272	61.90%	2,055
Douglas	1,722	71.30%	577	23.89%	51	2.11%	28	1.16%	11	0.46%	26	1.08%	1,145	47.41%	2,415
Ferry	511	54.89%	297	31.90%	102	10.96%	4	0.43%	15	1.61%	2	0.21%	214	22.99%	931
Franklin	572	69.25%	223	27.00%	12	1.45%	9	1.09%	7	0.85%	3	0.36%	349	42.25%	826
Garfield	777	70.32%	267	24.16%	35	3.17%	19	1.72%	6	0.54%	1	0.09%	510	46.15%	1,105
Island	424	71.99%	83	14.09%	56	9.51%	15	2.55%	2	0.34%	9	1.53%	341	57.89%	589
Jefferson	962	73.60%	283	21.65%	38	2.91%	6	0.46%	16	1.22%	2	0.15%	679	51.95%	1,307
King	20,434	70.39%	5,266	18.14%	2,126	7.32%	597	2.06%	448	1.54%	158	0.54%	15,168	52.25%	29,029
Kitsap	1,736	69.19%	320	12.75%	329	13.11%	85	3.39%	30	1.20%	9	0.36%	1,407 (Note: In this county where Parker ran third behind Debs, margin given is Roosevelt vote minus Debs vote and percentage margin Roosevelt percentage minus Debs percentage.)	56.08%	2,509
Kittitas	1,787	64.86%	523	18.98%	291	10.56%	78	2.83%	72	2.61%	4	0.15%	1,264	45.88%	2,755
Klickitat	1,370	70.65%	362	18.67%	124	6.40%	69	3.56%	7	0.36%	7	0.36%	1,008	51.99%	1,939
Lewis	3,098	69.93%	896	20.23%	251	5.67%	129	2.91%	31	0.70%	25	0.56%	2,202	49.71%	4,430
Lincoln	2,472	67.41%	1,004	27.38%	107	2.92%	45	1.23%	7	0.19%	32	0.87%	1,468	40.03%	3,667
Mason	661	63.50%	315	30.26%	19	1.83%	17	1.63%	13	1.25%	16	1.54%	346	33.24%	1,041
Okanogan	1,192	66.63%	435	24.32%	98	5.48%	9	0.50%	32	1.79%	23	1.29%	757	42.31%	1,789
Pacific	1,354	76.98%	258	14.67%	122	6.94%	16	0.91%	9	0.51%	0	0.00%	1,096	62.31%	1,759
Pierce	9,773	70.63%	2,351	16.99%	1,102	7.96%	312	2.25%	245	1.77%	53	0.38%	7,422	53.64%	13,836
San Juan	554	71.95%	113	14.68%	67	8.70%	23	2.99%	8	1.04%	5	0.65%	441	57.27%	770
Skagit	3,051	69.93%	880	20.17%	284	6.51%	82	1.88%	36	0.83%	30	0.69%	2,171	49.76%	4,363
Skamania	297	68.43%	61	14.06%	68	15.67%	6	1.38%	2	0.46%	0	0.00%	229	52.76%	434
Snohomish	6,025	71.69%	1,405	16.72%	592	7.04%	252	3.00%	100	1.19%	30	0.36%	4,620	54.97%	8,404
Spokane	10,258	71.71%	2,602	18.19%	944	6.60%	335	2.34%	125	0.87%	41	0.29%	7,656	53.52%	14,305
Stevens	2,369	63.31%	872	23.30%	393	10.50%	42	1.12%	44	1.18%	22	0.59%	1,497	40.01%	3,742
Thurston	2,121	68.51%	668	21.58%	234	7.56%	48	1.55%	16	0.52%	9	0.29%	1,453	46.93%	3,096
Wahkiakum	473	72.88%	101	15.56%	63	9.71%	7	1.08%	3	0.46%	2	0.31%	372	57.32%	649
Walla Walla	2,824	71.99%	956	24.37%	56	1.43%	55	1.40%	22	0.56%	10	0.25%	1,868	47.62%	3,923
Whatcom	5,410	70.41%	1,174	15.28%	693	9.02%	273	3.55%	100	1.30%	34	0.44%	4,236	55.13%	7,684
Whitman	4,090	66.48%	1,519	24.69%	317	5.15%	178	2.89%	24	0.39%	24	0.39%	2,571	41.79%	6,152
Yakima	3,484	70.36%	929	18.76%	358	7.23%	133	2.69%	35	0.71%	13	0.26%	2,555	51.60%	4,952
Totals	101,540	69.95%	28,098	19.36%	10,023	6.91%	3,229	2.22%	1,592	1.10%	669	0.46%	73,442	50.60%	145,151

==== Counties that flipped from Democratic to Republican ====
- Adams
- Douglas
- Ferry
- Franklin
- Lincoln
- Okanogan
- Skamania
- Stevens
- Whitman

== See also ==
- United States presidential elections in Washington (state)
