= Little Pend Oreille National Wildlife Refuge =

Wildlife preserve in Washington

- IUCN category IV (habitat/species management area)
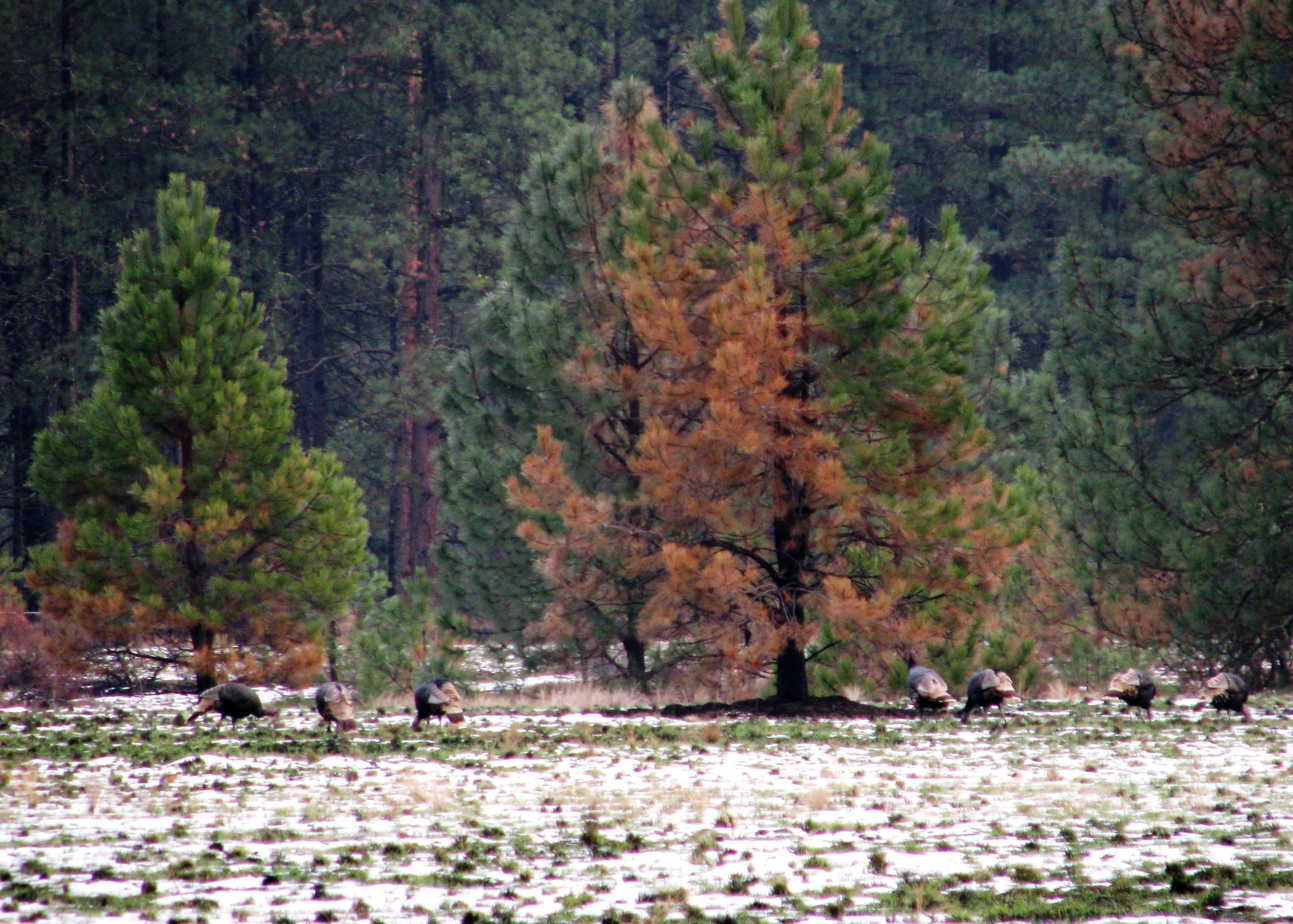

- Location within Washington (state)
- Location: Pend Oreille and Stevens counties, Washington, United States
- Nearest city: Colville, Washington
- Coordinates: 48°27′44″N 117°39′19″W
- Area: 42,593.57 acres (172.3701 km^{2})
- Established: 1939
- Governing body: U.S. Fish and Wildlife Service
- Website: Little Pend Oreille National Wildlife Refuge

The Little Pend Oreille National Wildlife Refuge is a wildlife preserve, one of the national wildlife refuges operated by the United States Fish and Wildlife Service. The refuge is located east of Colville, Washington, along the west slope of the Selkirk Mountain Range. It lies mostly in eastern Stevens County, with a small part extending eastward into western Pend Oreille County. It is the only mountainous, mixed-conifer forest refuge outside Alaska and the largest in Washington state.

Wildlife found in the refuge include numerous songbirds, bald eagles, elk, black bears, timber wolves, cougars, moose, beavers, and white-tailed deer.

Public uses include hunting, fishing, hiking, camping, and horseback riding.

== Gallery ==
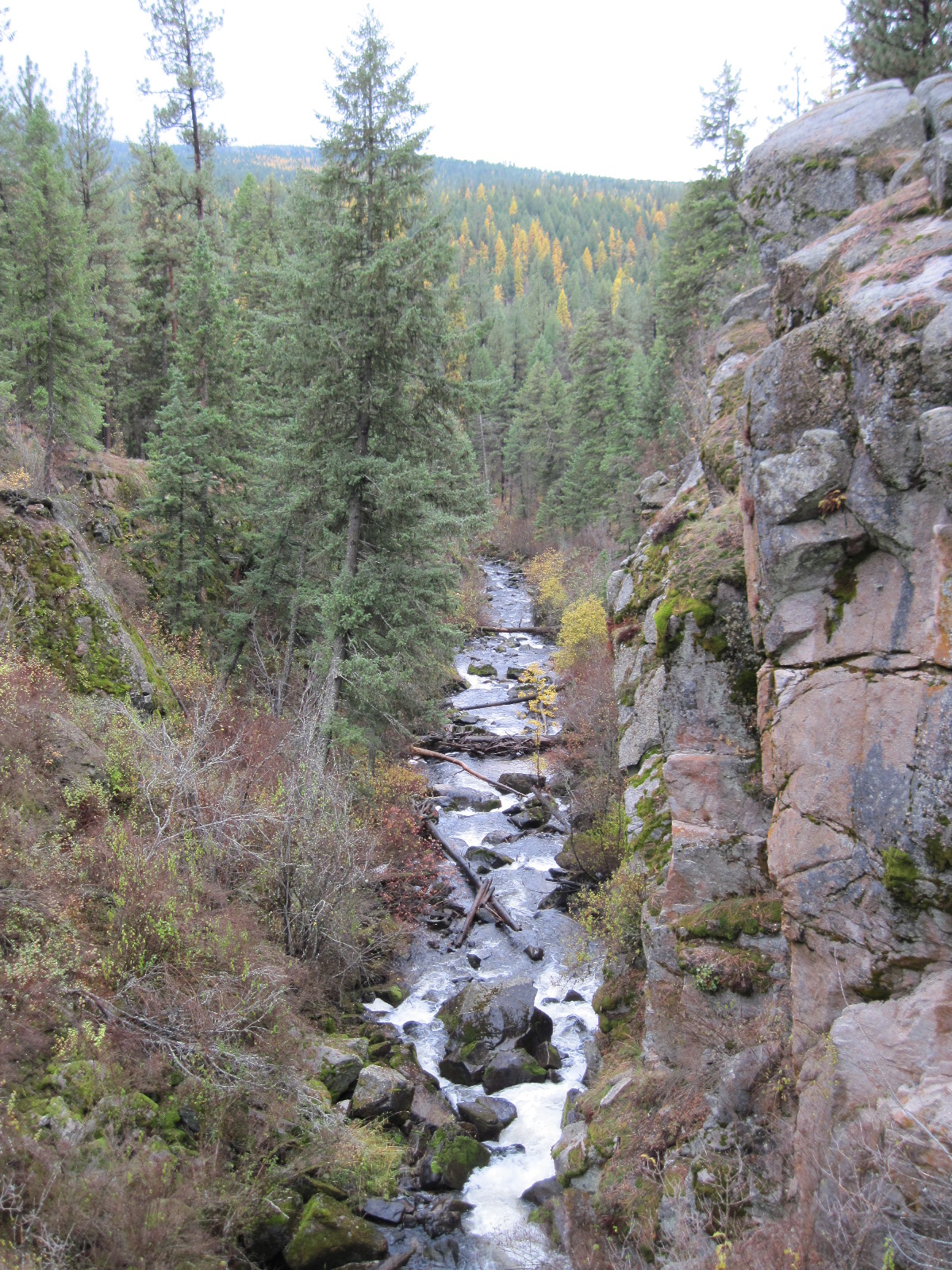
View of a gorge in the refuge

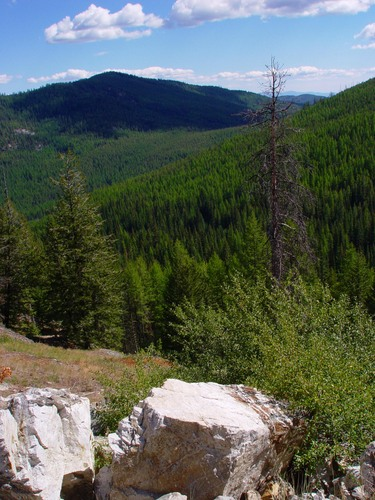
Refuge landscape

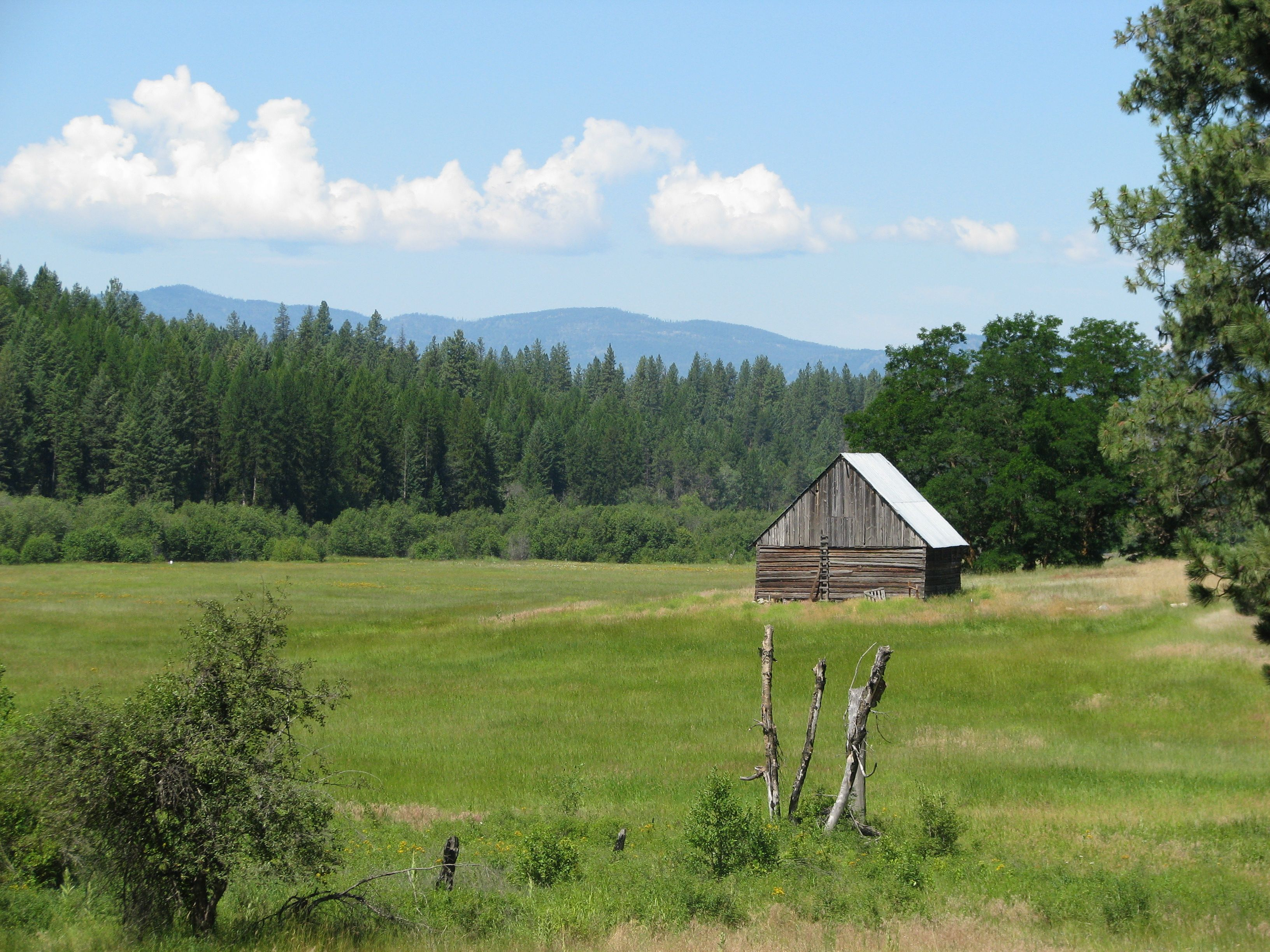
Farmhouse on the refuge
