= Altoona, Washington =

- CDP
- Location in the state of Washington
- Coordinates: 46°16′02″N 123°38′21″W
- Country: United States
- State: Washington
- County: Wahkiakum

Area
  - Total: 5.091 sq mi (13.186 km^{2})
  - Land: 5.091 sq mi (13.186 km^{2})
  - Water: 0 sq mi (0.000 km^{2}) 0.00%
- Elevation: 505 ft (154 m)

Population (2010)
  - Total: 39
- Population as of 2010 U.S. Census
- Time zone: UTC−8 (PST)
  - Summer (DST): UTC−7 (PDT)
- ZIP Code: 98643
- Area code(s): 360, 564
- FIPS code: 53-01745
- GNIS feature ID: 2584943

Altoona is a census-designated place (CDP) in Wahkiakum County, Washington, approximately 27 miles northwest of the town of Cathlamet. As of the 2020 census, Altoona had a population of 56. The CDP includes the communities of Carlson Landing and Dahlia.

== History ==
Altoona was one of six fish-buying stations and canneries located within a six-mile stretch on the lower Columbia River. 39 canneries operated in the Gray's Bay area, before the decline of the Columbia River salmon industry in the 1940s. Altoona was named after Altona, a city in Germany and a major fish-processing city on the Elbe River, by a Danish immigrant named Hans Petersen. In 1903, Petersen purchased 830 acres of land and founded the Altoona Mercantile and Fish Company Cannery. By 1910, the Altoona cannery was the fourth largest salmon cannery on the Columbia.

Altoona became a major stop for steamers and fishing boats traveling between Astoria and Portland. Altoona was accessible only by boat; there was no direct road to the town until the early 1950s. In 1935, the Columbia River Packers Association (known today as Bumble Bee Foods) purchased the cannery and moved their headquarters to Altoona from Cottardi Station, located about 1/2 mile downstream. The town prospered until the decline of the entire Columbia River salmon industry which resulted in the closing of the Altoona cannery in 1947. After the cannery closed, the population of Altoona began to dwindle and today has around 50 residents. The derelict cannery remained vacant and deteriorated until it collapsed and fell into the Columbia River during a windstorm in the late 1990s.

== Geography ==
According to the United States Census Bureau, the Altoona CDP has a total area of 5.09 square miles (13.2 km^{2}), all of which is land, while none of it is water.

== Climate ==
Altoona has a warm-summer Mediterranean climate (Köppen Csb) typical of the coasts of southwest Washington and northwest Oregon, characterized by cold, rainy winters and mild to warm summers, with an average temperature of 51°F (13 °C).

Climate data for Altoona, Washington
Month	Jan	Feb	Mar	Apr	May	Jun	Jul	Aug	Sep	Oct	Nov	Dec	Year
Mean daily maximum °F (°C)	49.2 (9.6)	51.6 (10.9)	54.5 (12.5)	58.1 (14.5)	62.7 (17.1)	66.5 (19.2)	70.9 (21.6)	71.8 (22.1)	70.1 (21.2)	61.6 (16.4)	52.9 (11.6)	48.0 (8.9)	59.8 (15.5)
Mean daily minimum °F (°C)	36.2 (2.3)	35.7 (2.1)	37.5 (3.1)	39.4 (4.1)	44.2 (6.8)	48.4 (9.1)	51.7 (10.9)	51.6 (10.9)	47.8 (8.8)	42.8 (6.0)	38.6 (3.7)	35.5 (1.9)	42.5 (5.8)
Average precipitation inches (mm)	15.2 (390)	10.9 (280)	10.7 (270)	7.7 (200)	4.7 (120)	3.7 (94)	1.5 (38)	1.8 (46)	3.5 (89)	9.2 (230)	16.1 (410)	15.0 (380)	100 (2,547)
Average snowfall inches (cm)	1.2 (3.0)	1.2 (3.0)	0 (0)	0 (0)	0 (0)	0 (0)	0 (0)	0 (0)	0 (0)	0 (0)	0.4 (1.0)	0.9 (2.3)	3.7 (9.3)

== Demographics ==
Historical population
Census	Pop.	Note	%±
2010	39		—
2020	56		43.6%
U.S. Decennial Census; 2000 2010

Altoona first appeared as a census designated place in the 2010 U.S. census.

=== Racial and ethnic composition ===
Altoona CDP, Washington – racial and ethnic composition Note: the US Census treats Hispanic/Latino as an ethnic category. This table excludes Latinos from the racial categories and assigns them to a separate category. Hispanics/Latinos may be of any race.
Race / ethnicity (NH = Non-Hispanic)	Pop 2010	Pop 2020	% 2010	% 2020
White alone (NH)	29	45	74.36%	80.36%
Black or African American alone (NH)	0	2	0.00%	3.57%
Native American or Alaska Native alone (NH)	3	2	7.69%	3.57%
Asian alone (NH)	0	0	0.00%	0.00%
Native Hawaiian or Pacific Islander alone (NH)	0	0	0.00%	0.00%
Other race alone (NH)	0	0	0.00%	0.00%
Mixed-race or multiracial (NH)	5	5	12.82%	8.93%
Hispanic or Latino (any race)	2	2	5.13%	3.57%
Total	39	56	100.00%	100.00%

=== 2020 census ===
As of the 2020 census, there were 56 people, 34 housing units, and 15 families residing in the CDP. There were 45 white people, 2 African Americans, 2 Native Americans, 0 Asians, 0 Pacific Islanders, and 7 people from two or more races. 2 people had Hispanic or Latino origin.

The ancestry for Altoona was 36.4% German, 33.3% English, 27.3% Irish, and 27.3% Scottish.

The median age in Altoona was 75.1 years old. 54.5% of the population were over 65.

0.0% of the population were in poverty.

=== 2010 census ===
As of the census of 2010, there were 39 people, 20 households, and 17 families residing in the CDP. The population density was 7.66 people per square mile (2.96 people/km^{2}). There were 34 housing units at an average density of 6.68 per square mile (2.58/km^{2}). The racial makeup of the CDP was 79.5% White, 0.0% African American, 7.7% Native American, 0.0% Asian, 0.0% Pacific Islander, 0.0% from other races, and 12.8% from two or more races. Hispanic or Latino people of any race were 5.1% of the population.

There were 20 households, out of which 5.0% had children under the age of 18 living with them, 85.0% were married couples living together, 0.0% had a female householder with no husband present, and 15.0% were non-families. 15.0% of all households were made up of individuals, and 0.0% had someone living alone who was 65 years of age or older. The average household size was 1.95 and the average family size was 2.12.

In the CDP, the age distribution of the population shows 2.6% under the age of 18, 0.0% from 18 to 24, 7.7% from 25 to 44, 48.7% from 45 to 64, and 41.0% who were 65 years of age or older. The median age was 62.6 years. For every 100 females, there were 116.7 males. For every 100 females age 18 and over, there were 123.5 males.

== Education ==
The Altoona community is part of the Naselle-Grays River Valley School District, a K-12 school district of about 300 students.
