= 1916 United States presidential election in Washington (state) =

- November 7, 1916

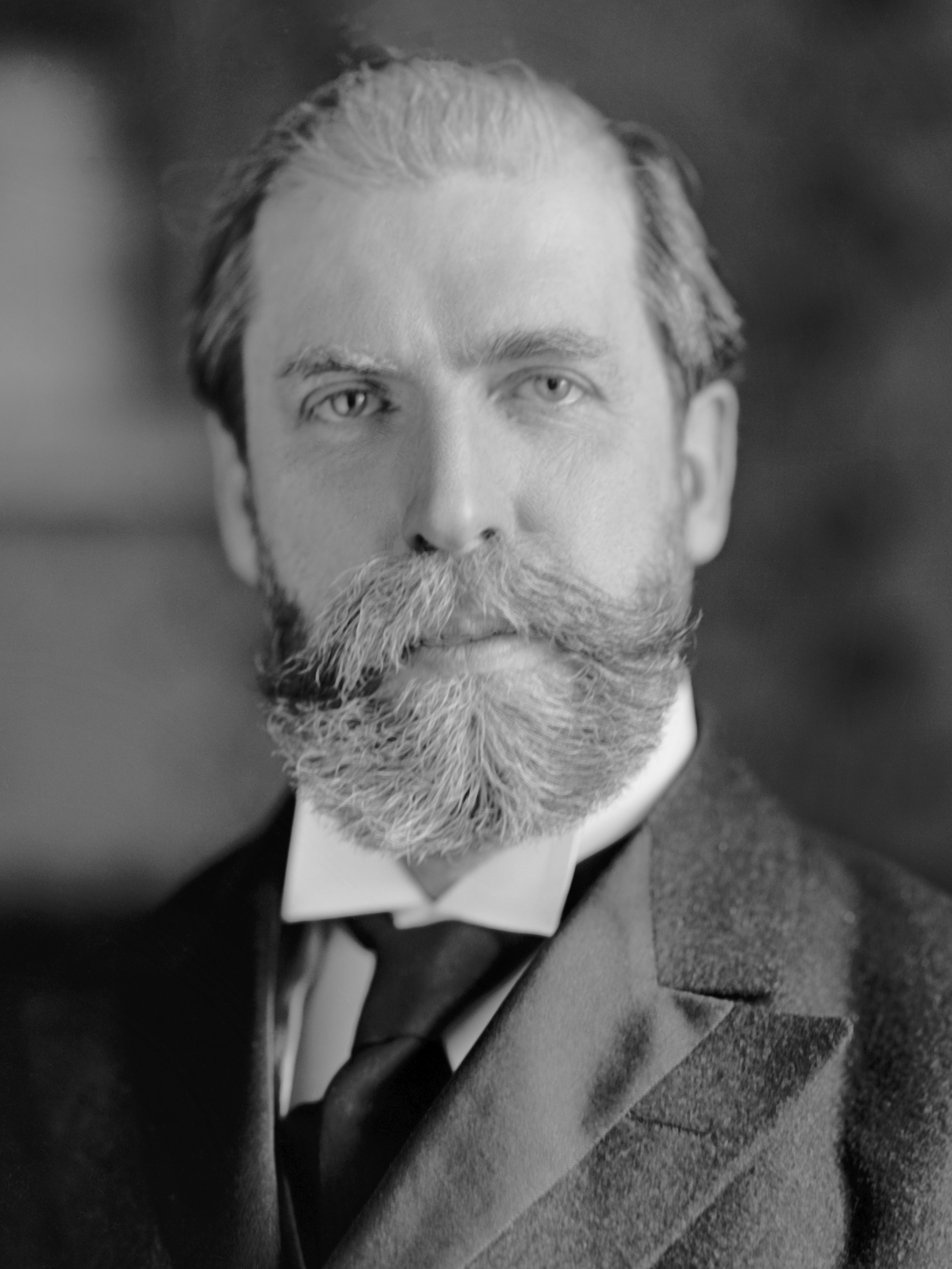

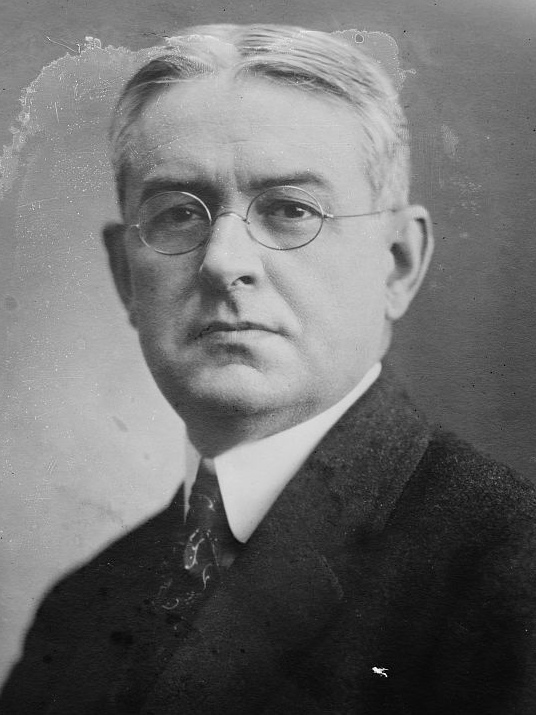
Nominee	Woodrow Wilson	Charles Evans Hughes	Allan L. Benson
Party	Democratic	Republican	Socialist
Home state	New Jersey	New York	New York
Running mate	Thomas R. Marshall	Charles W. Fairbanks	George Ross Kirkpatrick
Electoral vote	7	0	0
Popular vote	183,388	167,208	22,800
Percentage	48.13%	43.89%	5.98%
County results
Wilson
40–50%
50–60%
Hughes
40–50%
50–60%
President before election
Woodrow Wilson
Democratic
Elected President
Woodrow Wilson
Democratic

The 1916 United States presidential election in Washington took place on November 7, 1916, as part of the 1916 United States presidential election in which all contemporary 48 states participated. Voters chose seven electors to represent them in the Electoral College via a popular vote pitting Democratic incumbents Woodrow Wilson Thomas R. Marshall, against Republican challengers Associate Justice Charles Evans Hughes and his running mate, former Vice-president Charles W. Fairbanks.

Washington had been a one-party Republican bastion for twenty years before this election. Democratic representation in the Washington legislature would during this period at times be countable on one hand, and neither Alton B. Parker nor William Jennings Bryan in his third presidential run carried even one county in the state. Republican primaries had taken over as the chief mode of political competition when introduced in the late 1900s.

However, a powerful "peace vote" in the Western states due to opposition to participation in World War I, and the transfer of a considerable part of the substantial vote for Eugene Debs from the previous election to Wilson owing to such Progressive reforms as the Sixteenth and Seventeenth Amendments allowed Woodrow Wilson to carry Washington by a 4.25 percentage point margin. In doing this, Wilson was the first ever Democratic victor in the Western Washington Puget Sound counties of Island, San Juan and Kitsap, and the only Democrat between 1904 and 1924 to carry any Washington county in a two-way presidential race.

After the votes were counted, there was some debate over who should be the seventh elector from the state. One of the original electors on the Democratic ticket, A. T. Steam, died prior to election day. The state's Democratic party replaced him with Edwin M. Connor, but Stream's name was not replaced on the ballot in ten of Washington's 39 counties. Since voters chose electors directly at the time, this resulted in a split of the vote between Connor and Steam and a Republican elector, Warren H. Lewis, received the seventh-most votes and therefore would be entitled to the final elector position and subsequently cast a vote for Charles Evans Hughes. Many believed, however, that given the voters' clear intent to elect Wilson and Washington's potential split not affecting the outcome, Lewis should either cast his electoral vote for the Wilson ticket or step aside and allow Connor to be appointed the seventh elector. After consulting with the state's Republican committee, Lewis declined to contest Connor's appointment as elector. As such, all seven of Washington's electoral votes were cast for Wilson and Marshall.

== Results ==
General Election Results
Party	Pledged to	Elector	Votes
Democratic Party	Woodrow Wilson	D. M. Drumheller	183,388
Democratic Party	Woodrow Wilson	C. C. Brown	183,242
Democratic Party	Woodrow Wilson	George F. Christensen	183,230
Democratic Party	Woodrow Wilson	Francis Donahoe	183,028
Democratic Party	Woodrow Wilson	Joseph A. Sloan	182,813
Democratic Party	Woodrow Wilson	G. W. Hoxie	182,806
Republican Party	Charles Evans Hughes	Warren H. Lewis (Note: As he received the 7th most votes, Lewis was entitled to be elected, but declined to contest Connor's appointment as the seventh Democratic elector)	167,208
Republican Party	Charles Evans Hughes	J. Henry Smith	166,406
Republican Party	Charles Evans Hughes	George E. Finley	166,375
Republican Party	Charles Evans Hughes	Luther Weedin	166,340
Republican Party	Charles Evans Hughes	E. E. Beard	166,298
Republican Party	Charles Evans Hughes	Richard M. Buttle	166,143
Republican Party	Charles Evans Hughes	J. A. Perkins	165,971
Democratic Party	Woodrow Wilson	Edwin M. Connor (Note: Replaced A. T. Stream on most Democratic ballots) (Note: Although Connor ran behind the Republican ticket, the top Republican elector, who was otherwise entitled to be elected, declined to contest Connor's appointment as the seventh Democratic elector)	134,481
Democratic Party	Woodrow Wilson	A. T. Stream (Note: Died prior to Election Day and was replaced by Edwin M. Connor on most but not all ballots)	47,977
Socialist Party	Allan L. Benson	Marie Nielsen	22,800
Socialist Party	Allan L. Benson	Allen Brooks	22,518
Socialist Party	Allan L. Benson	Laura M. House	22,515
Socialist Party	Allan L. Benson	Helen Camp	22,510
Socialist Party	Allan L. Benson	Kate Sutton	22,490
Socialist Party	Allan L. Benson	Bertha Zietz	22,486
Socialist Party	Allan L. Benson	Bonner Bartlett	22,482
Prohibition Party	Frank Hanly	Salome R. Lippy	6,868
Prohibition Party	Frank Hanly	Walter F. McDowell	6,840
Prohibition Party	Frank Hanly	John Anderson	6,838
Prohibition Party	Frank Hanly	R. M. Shoemake	6,819
Prohibition Party	Frank Hanly	L. Stanton	6,814
Prohibition Party	Frank Hanly	E. B. Crary	6,812
Prohibition Party	Frank Hanly	C. C. Gridley	6,790
Socialist Labor Party	Arthur E. Reimer	Gotfried Gustafson	730
Socialist Labor Party	Arthur E. Reimer	Jerry E. Sullivan	711
Socialist Labor Party	Arthur E. Reimer	Andrew P. Anderson	701
Socialist Labor Party	Arthur E. Reimer	John C. Schafer	701
Socialist Labor Party	Arthur E. Reimer	Arne Hage	699
Socialist Labor Party	Arthur E. Reimer	Leslie H. Sawyer	697
Socialist Labor Party	Arthur E. Reimer	Fred Kurtzman	690
Votes cast (Note: Based on totals for highest elector on each ticket)			380,994

=== Results by county ===
County	Woodrow Wilson Democratic		Charles Evans Hughes Republican		Allan L. Benson Socialist		Frank Hanly Prohibition		Arthur E. Reimer Socialist Labor		Margin		Total votes cast (Note: Based on highest elector on each ticket)
County	#	%	#	%	#	%	#	%	#	%	#	%	Total votes cast
Adams	1,294	48.41%	1,237	46.28%	112	4.19%	21	0.79%	9	0.34%	57	2.13%	2,673
Asotin	1,136	48.59%	1,004	42.94%	117	5.00%	80	3.42%	1	0.04%	132	5.65%	2,338
Benton	1,351	42.03%	1,460	45.43%	342	10.64%	53	1.65%	8	0.25%	-109	-3.39%	3,214
Chelan	2,747	43.46%	3,011	47.63%	405	6.41%	151	2.39%	7	0.11%	-264	-4.18%	6,321
Clallam	1,339	41.06%	1,475	45.23%	418	12.82%	19	0.58%	10	0.31%	-136	-4.17%	3,261
Clarke	3,728	41.28%	4,419	48.93%	677	7.50%	198	2.19%	10	0.11%	-691	-7.65%	9,032
Columbia	1,164	47.57%	1,148	46.91%	108	4.41%	25	1.02%	2	0.08%	16	0.65%	2,447
Cowlitz	1,282	33.44%	2,113	55.11%	378	9.86%	57	1.49%	4	0.10%	-831	-21.67%	3,834
Douglas	1,916	59.52%	1,125	34.95%	148	4.60%	28	0.87%	2	0.06%	791	24.57%	3,219
Ferry	913	52.99%	581	33.72%	221	12.83%	5	0.29%	3	0.17%	332	19.27%	1,723
Franklin	1,110	57.93%	671	35.02%	109	5.69%	23	1.20%	3	0.16%	439	22.91%	1,916
Garfield	728	45.02%	845	52.26%	32	1.98%	11	0.68%	1	0.06%	-117	-7.24%	1,617
Grant	1,563	51.58%	1,205	39.77%	221	7.29%	38	1.25%	3	0.10%	358	11.82%	3,030
Grays Harbor	4,992	44.04%	5,024	44.32%	1,209	10.67%	96	0.85%	15	0.13%	-32	-0.28%	11,336
Island	855	46.34%	804	43.58%	170	9.21%	16	0.87%	0	0.00%	51	2.76%	1,845
Jefferson	861	40.77%	1,094	51.80%	134	6.34%	22	1.04%	1	0.05%	-233	-11.03%	2,112
King	52,362	54.71%	38,959	40.71%	3,193	3.34%	922	0.96%	272	0.28%	13,403	14.00%	95,708
Kitsap	3,479	49.89%	2,638	37.83%	751	10.77%	94	1.35%	12	0.17%	841	12.06%	6,974
Kittitas	2,609	49.40%	2,310	43.74%	262	4.96%	93	1.76%	7	0.13%	299	5.66%	5,281
Klickitat	1,478	45.35%	1,570	48.17%	186	5.71%	23	0.71%	2	0.06%	-92	-2.82%	3,259
Lewis	4,318	40.73%	5,186	48.92%	845	7.97%	239	2.25%	13	0.12%	-868	-8.19%	10,601
Lincoln	2,827	51.67%	2,356	43.06%	221	4.04%	62	1.13%	5	0.09%	471	8.61%	5,471
Mason	779	45.19%	764	44.32%	162	9.40%	16	0.93%	3	0.17%	15	0.87%	1,724
Okanogan	2,924	54.82%	1,896	35.55%	474	8.89%	33	0.62%	7	0.13%	1,028	19.27%	5,334
Pacific	1,537	34.02%	2,688	59.50%	257	5.69%	30	0.66%	6	0.13%	-1,151	-25.48%	4,518
Pend Oreille	1,080	50.94%	916	43.21%	111	5.24%	9	0.42%	4	0.19%	164	7.74%	2,120
Pierce	18,940	48.85%	16,780	43.28%	1,894	4.89%	1,059	2.73%	97	0.25%	2,160	5.57%	38,770
San Juan	669	47.96%	591	42.37%	122	8.75%	13	0.93%	0	0.00%	78	5.59%	1,395
Skagit	4,936	47.88%	4,142	40.17%	951	9.22%	256	2.48%	25	0.24%	794	7.70%	10,310
Skamania	451	46.07%	489	49.95%	34	3.47%	5	0.51%	0	0.00%	-38	-3.88%	979
Snohomish	8,390	41.52%	8,625	42.68%	2,543	12.58%	606	3.00%	43	0.21%	-235	-1.16%	20,207
Spokane	21,339	49.49%	19,503	45.23%	1,321	3.06%	877	2.03%	80	0.19%	1,836	4.26%	43,120
Stevens	3,184	47.84%	2,684	40.32%	678	10.19%	104	1.56%	6	0.09%	500	7.51%	6,656
Thurston	2,658	39.39%	3,223	47.76%	624	9.25%	231	3.42%	12	0.18%	-565	-8.37%	6,748
Wahkiakum	340	36.13%	490	52.07%	103	10.95%	7	0.74%	1	0.11%	-150	-15.94%	941
Walla Walla	4,456	48.29%	4,429	48.00%	218	2.36%	120	1.30%	4	0.04%	27	0.29%	9,227
Whatcom	5,629	35.53%	7,632	48.18%	2,075	13.10%	465	2.94%	41	0.26%	-2,003	-12.64%	15,842
Whitman	5,888	52.33%	4,933	43.84%	239	2.12%	186	1.65%	5	0.04%	955	8.49%	11,251
Yakima	6,136	41.91%	7,188	49.10%	735	5.02%	575	3.93%	6	0.04%	-1,052	-7.19%	14,640
Totals	183,388	48.13%	167,208	43.89%	22,800	5.98%	6,868	1.80%	730	0.19%	16,180	4.25%	380,994

==== Counties that flipped from Republican to Democratic ====
- Asotin

==== Counties that flipped from Progressive to Democratic ====
- Grant
- Island
- King
- Kitsap
- Kittitas
- Lincoln
- Pierce
- San Juan
- Skagit
- Spokane
- Walla Walla

==== Counties that flipped from Democratic to Republican ====
- Clark
- Skamania

==== Counties that flipped from Progressive to Republican ====
- Benton
- Chelan
- Garfield
- Jefferson
- Snohomish
- Wahkiakum
- Whatcom
- Yakima

== See also ==
- United States presidential elections in Washington (state)
