= 1976 United States presidential election in Washington (state) =

- November 2, 1976

Nominee	Gerald Ford	Jimmy Carter
Party	Republican	Democratic
Home state	Michigan	Georgia
Running mate	Bob Dole	Walter Mondale
Electoral vote	8 (Note: One elector voted for Ronald Reagan for president and Bob Dole for vice president)	0
Popular vote	777,732	717,323
Percentage	50.00%	46.11%
County results
Ford
40–50%
50–60%
60–70%
Carter
40–50%
50–60%
President before election
Gerald Ford
Republican
Elected President
Jimmy Carter
Democratic

The 1976 United States presidential election in Washington was held on November 2, 1976, as part of the 1976 United States presidential election. State voters chose nine representatives, or electors, to the Electoral College, who voted for president and vice president.

Incumbent President Gerald Ford won the state of Washington with 50% of the vote, which made the state 6% more Republican than the nation-at-large, but Ford received only eight of the state's nine electoral votes. Former California Governor Ronald Reagan lost the Republican nomination to Gerald Ford in 1976 and was not on the ballot in any state. However, he was given one electoral vote by Washington faithless elector Mike Padden.

As of 2024, the 1976 election remains the last time that a Democrat would win the presidency without carrying Washington state, or that the state would vote Republican in a close nationwide contest. 1976 was also the last time until 2016 that a presidential candidate would lose an electoral vote to a faithless elector in the state. This was also the last time that Clallam County backed the losing national candidate until 2024.

== Results ==
1976 United States presidential election in Washington
Party	Candidate	Votes	Percentage	Electoral votes
Republican	Gerald Ford (incumbent)	777,732	50.00%	8
Democratic	Jimmy Carter	717,323	46.11%	0
Independent	Eugene McCarthy	36,986	2.38%	0
Right Government	Lester Maddox	8,585	0.55%	0
American	Thomas J. Anderson	5,046	0.32%	0
Libertarian	Roger MacBride	5,042	0.32%	0
Bicentennial Reality	Margaret Wright	1,124	0.07%	0
Socialist Workers	Peter Camejo	905	0.06%	0
U.S. Labor	Lyndon LaRouche	903	0.06%	0
Communist	Gus Hall	817	0.05%	0
Socialist Labor	Julius Levin	713	0.05%	0
Socialist	Frank Zeidler	358	0.02%	0
Republican	Ronald Reagan	0	0.00%	1
Totals		1,555,534	100.00%	9
Voter turnout (Voting age/Registered voters)				60%/75%

=== Results by county ===
County	Gerald Ford Republican		Jimmy Carter Democratic		Eugene McCarthy Independent		Other candidates Various parties		Margin		Total votes cast
County	#	%	#	%	#	%	#	%	#	%	Total votes cast
Adams	2,795	58.56%	1,790	37.50%	68	1.43%	115	2.41%	1,005	21.06%	4,773
Asotin	2,752	47.22%	2,898	49.73%	80	1.38%	87	1.50%	-146	-2.51%	5,828
Benton	22,135	63.95%	11,306	32.67%	677	1.96%	441	1.28%	10,829	31.28%	34,611
Chelan	10,492	56.13%	7,623	40.78%	322	1.73%	219	1.17%	2,869	15.35%	18,692
Clallam	9,132	49.67%	8,268	44.97%	475	2.60%	418	2.29%	864	4.70%	18,386
Clark	27,938	45.65%	31,080	50.78%	1,469	2.40%	597	0.98%	-3,142	-5.13%	61,201
Columbia	1,153	56.69%	829	40.76%	29	1.43%	23	1.13%	324	15.93%	2,034
Cowlitz	12,531	44.11%	14,958	52.66%	562	1.98%	293	1.03%	-2,427	-8.55%	28,406
Douglas	4,547	53.09%	3,809	44.48%	111	1.30%	83	0.97%	738	8.61%	8,564
Ferry	776	45.86%	814	48.11%	45	2.66%	55	3.25%	-38	-2.25%	1,692
Franklin	5,671	54.51%	4,369	42.00%	192	1.85%	151	1.45%	1,302	12.51%	10,403
Garfield	892	57.18%	616	39.49%	26	1.67%	23	1.48%	276	17.69%	1,560
Grant	9,192	51.87%	7,777	43.89%	400	2.26%	305	1.73%	1,415	7.98%	17,721
Grays Harbor	9,464	39.61%	13,478	56.41%	534	2.24%	331	1.39%	-4,014	-16.80%	23,893
Island	7,804	55.33%	5,859	41.54%	280	1.99%	134	0.95%	1,945	13.79%	14,104
Jefferson	2,794	45.86%	2,913	47.82%	199	3.29%	136	2.25%	-119	-1.96%	6,092
King	279,382	50.79%	248,743	45.22%	14,234	2.60%	5,483	1.00%	30,609	5.57%	550,119
Kitsap	23,124	45.56%	25,701	50.64%	1,179	2.33%	642	1.27%	-2,577	-5.08%	50,750
Kittitas	4,765	47.57%	4,858	48.50%	267	2.67%	99	0.99%	-93	-0.93%	10,017
Klickitat	2,573	44.99%	2,890	50.53%	126	2.21%	119	2.08%	-317	-5.54%	5,719
Lewis	10,933	51.65%	9,026	42.64%	557	2.64%	601	2.85%	1,907	9.01%	21,167
Lincoln	2,925	57.57%	1,978	38.93%	98	1.93%	71	1.40%	947	18.64%	5,081
Mason	4,758	42.14%	6,060	53.67%	268	2.38%	178	1.58%	-1,302	-11.53%	11,291
Okanogan	5,455	47.05%	5,543	47.81%	338	2.92%	233	2.01%	-88	-0.76%	11,595
Pacific	2,781	37.84%	4,278	58.20%	192	2.62%	77	1.05%	-1,497	-20.36%	7,350
Pend Oreille	1,516	47.82%	1,533	48.36%	62	1.96%	51	1.61%	-17	-0.54%	3,170
Pierce	74,668	46.92%	78,238	49.16%	4,316	2.72%	1,502	0.95%	-3,570	-2.24%	159,148
San Juan	1,998	53.68%	1,467	39.41%	152	4.12%	76	2.06%	531	14.27%	3,722
Skagit	13,060	48.66%	12,718	47.39%	575	2.15%	412	1.54%	342	1.27%	26,837
Skamania	1,102	41.55%	1,436	54.15%	82	3.09%	30	1.13%	-334	-12.60%	2,652
Snohomish	55,375	47.95%	55,623	48.16%	2,470	2.14%	1,731	1.50%	-248	-0.21%	115,488
Spokane	68,290	53.37%	55,660	43.50%	2,033	1.59%	1,683	1.32%	12,630	9.87%	127,954
Stevens	4,719	51.81%	3,824	41.98%	181	1.99%	357	3.93%	895	9.83%	9,109
Thurston	21,000	47.67%	21,247	48.23%	1,120	2.55%	494	1.13%	-247	-0.56%	44,056
Wahkiakum	704	41.17%	942	55.09%	32	1.87%	30	1.76%	-238	-13.92%	1,710
Walla Walla	10,883	59.15%	7,012	38.11%	328	1.78%	153	0.83%	3,871	21.04%	18,400
Whatcom	20,007	48.00%	19,739	47.36%	1,393	3.36%	373	0.90%	268	0.64%	41,679
Whitman	8,168	54.21%	6,197	41.13%	428	2.85%	215	1.43%	1,971	13.08%	15,068
Yakima	29,478	53.12%	24,223	43.65%	1,086	1.96%	624	1.13%	5,255	9.47%	55,492
Totals	777,732	50.00%	717,323	46.11%	36,986	2.38%	23,493	1.51%	60,409	3.89%	1,555,534

==== Counties that flipped from Republican to Democratic ====
- Asotin
- Clark
- Cowlitz
- Ferry
- Jefferson
- Kitsap
- Kittitas
- Klickitat
- Mason
- Okanogan
- Pend Oreille
- Pierce
- Skamania
- Snohomish
- Thurston
- Wahkiakum

=== By congressional district ===
Ford won 4 of the state's 7 congressional districts, including 3 which elected Democrats.

District	Ford	Carter	Representative
1st	54.7%	45.3%	Joel Pritchard
2nd	52.1%	47.9%	Lloyd Meeds
3rd	48.1%	51.9%	Don Bonker
4th	54.2%	45.8%	Mike McCormack
5th	55.6%	44.4%	Tom Foley
6th	49.5%	50.5%	Floyd Hicks
6th	49.5%	50.5%	Norm Dicks
7th	49.8%	50.2%	Brock Adams

== See also ==
- United States presidential elections in Washington (state)
