= Penrith, Washington =

Unincorporated community in Washington, US

- Unincorporated community
- Location of Penrith, Washington
- Coordinates: 48°09′08″N 117°05′58″W
- Country: United States
- State: Washington
- County: Pend Oreille
- Established: 1901
- Time zone: UTC-8 (Pacific (PST))
  - Summer (DST): UTC-7 (PDT)
- Area code: 509

Penrith is an unincorporated community in Pend Oreille County, in the U.S. state of Washington.

== History ==
A post office called Penrith was established in 1901, and remained in operation until 1916. The community was given its name by railroad officials.
