= 1956 United States presidential election in Washington (state) =

- November 6, 1956

All 9 Washington votes to the Electoral College

Nominee	Dwight D. Eisenhower	Adlai Stevenson
Party	Republican	Democratic
Home state	Pennsylvania (Note: Although he was born in Texas and grew up in Kansas before his military career, at the time of the 1952 election Eisenhower was president of Columbia University and was, officially, a resident of New York. During his first term as president, he moved his private residence to Gettysburg, Pennsylvania, and officially changed his residency to Pennsylvania.)	Illinois
Running mate	Richard Nixon	Estes Kefauver
Electoral vote	9	0
Popular vote	620,430	523,002
Percentage	53.91%	45.44%
County results
Eisenhower
50–60%
60–70%
Stevenson
40–50%
50–60%
President before election
Dwight D. Eisenhower
Republican
Elected President
Dwight D. Eisenhower
Republican

The 1956 United States presidential election in Washington took place on November 6, 1956, as part of the 1956 United States presidential election. Voters chose nine representatives, or electors, to the Electoral College, who voted for president and vice president.

Washington was won by incumbent President Dwight D. Eisenhower (R–Pennsylvania), running with Vice President Richard Nixon, with 53.91% of the popular vote, against Adlai Stevenson (D–Illinois), running with Senator Estes Kefauver, with 45.44% of the popular vote.

Eisenhower became the first Republican to carry Washington more than once.

== Results ==
1956 United States presidential election in Washington
Party	Candidate	Votes	%
Republican	Dwight D. Eisenhower (inc.)	620,430	53.91%
Democratic	Adlai Stevenson	523,002	45.44%
Socialist Labor	Eric Hass	7,457	0.65%
Total votes		1,150,889	100%

=== Results by county ===
County	Dwight D. Eisenhower Republican		Adlai Stevenson Democratic		Eric Hass Socialist Labor		Margin		Total votes cast
County	#	%	#	%	#	%	#	%	Total votes cast
Adams	2,267	57.48%	1,673	42.42%	4	0.10%	594	15.06%	3,944
Asotin	2,608	50.15%	2,586	49.73%	6	0.12%	22	0.42%	5,200
Benton	13,807	53.99%	11,760	45.99%	4	0.02%	2,047	8.00%	25,571
Chelan	10,405	57.42%	7,600	41.94%	117	0.65%	2,805	15.48%	18,122
Clallam	6,852	54.82%	5,632	45.06%	16	0.13%	1,220	9.76%	12,500
Clark	19,330	49.51%	19,665	50.36%	51	0.13%	-335	-0.85%	39,046
Columbia	1,423	65.82%	739	34.18%	0	0.00%	684	31.64%	2,162
Cowlitz	11,912	48.80%	12,448	51.00%	50	0.20%	-536	-2.20%	24,410
Douglas	2,602	46.09%	3,034	53.75%	9	0.16%	-432	-7.66%	5,645
Ferry	662	44.34%	830	55.59%	1	0.07%	-168	-11.25%	1,493
Franklin	3,763	46.51%	4,322	53.42%	5	0.06%	-559	-6.91%	8,090
Garfield	966	60.15%	639	39.79%	1	0.06%	327	20.36%	1,606
Grant	6,603	48.73%	6,938	51.21%	8	0.06%	-335	-2.48%	13,549
Grays Harbor	11,599	47.32%	12,858	52.45%	57	0.23%	-1,259	-5.13%	24,514
Island	3,196	61.20%	2,009	38.47%	17	0.33%	1,187	22.73%	5,222
Jefferson	2,300	56.69%	1,750	43.14%	7	0.17%	550	13.55%	4,057
King	213,504	55.28%	167,443	43.35%	5,276	1.37%	46,061	11.93%	386,223
Kitsap	17,986	47.73%	19,641	52.12%	58	0.15%	-1,655	-4.39%	37,685
Kittitas	5,097	57.72%	3,726	42.20%	7	0.08%	1,371	15.52%	8,830
Klickitat	2,794	51.94%	2,577	47.91%	8	0.15%	217	4.03%	5,379
Lewis	11,949	60.69%	7,714	39.18%	25	0.13%	4,235	21.51%	19,688
Lincoln	3,114	57.77%	2,273	42.17%	3	0.06%	841	15.60%	5,390
Mason	4,026	51.05%	3,840	48.69%	20	0.25%	186	2.36%	7,886
Okanogan	5,448	50.66%	5,298	49.27%	8	0.07%	150	1.39%	10,754
Pacific	3,799	49.76%	3,824	50.09%	12	0.16%	-25	-0.33%	7,635
Pend Oreille	1,488	49.09%	1,540	50.81%	3	0.10%	-52	-1.72%	3,031
Pierce	57,078	49.40%	57,728	49.96%	738	0.64%	-650	-0.56%	115,544
San Juan	1,105	65.27%	584	34.49%	4	0.24%	521	30.78%	1,693
Skagit	12,149	56.67%	9,243	43.11%	48	0.22%	2,906	13.56%	21,440
Skamania	1,014	45.90%	1,193	54.01%	2	0.09%	-179	-8.11%	2,209
Snohomish	30,052	48.22%	31,950	51.26%	325	0.52%	-1,898	-3.04%	62,327
Spokane	60,335	55.21%	48,833	44.68%	119	0.11%	11,502	10.53%	109,287
Stevens	4,499	54.06%	3,808	45.76%	15	0.18%	691	8.30%	8,322
Thurston	14,093	58.70%	9,897	41.22%	19	0.08%	4,196	17.48%	24,009
Wahkiakum	808	45.73%	953	53.93%	6	0.34%	-145	-8.20%	1,767
Walla Walla	11,827	66.04%	6,076	33.93%	7	0.04%	5,751	32.11%	17,910
Whatcom	17,414	54.10%	14,533	45.15%	244	0.76%	2,881	8.95%	32,191
Whitman	8,572	63.81%	4,854	36.13%	8	0.06%	3,718	27.68%	13,434
Yakima	31,984	60.21%	20,991	39.51%	149	0.28%	10,993	20.70%	53,124
Totals	620,430	53.91%	523,002	45.44%	7,457	0.65%	97,428	8.47%	1,150,889

==== Counties that flipped from Democratic to Republican ====
- Mason

==== Counties that flipped from Republican to Democratic ====
- Clark
- Cowlitz
- Douglas
- Franklin
- Grant
- Pacific
- Pend Oreille
- Pierce
- Skamania

== See also ==
- United States presidential elections in Washington (state)
