= Washington State Route 409 =

Washington state highway in Wahkiakum County

State Route 409

- SR 409 highlighted in red

Route information
- Auxiliary route of SR 4
- Maintained by WSDOT
- Length: 3.84 mi (6.18 km)
- Existed: 1964–present

Major junctions
- South end: Wahkiakum County Ferry on Puget Island
- East end: SR 4 in Cathlamet

Location
- Country: United States
- State: Washington

Highway system
- State highways in Washington; Interstate; US; State; Scenic; Pre-1964; 1964 renumbering; Former
← I-405	→ SR 410

State Route 409 (SR 409) is a short Washington state highway in Wahkiakum County. The highway runs north from the Wahkiakum County Ferry on Puget Island to SR 4 in the county seat of Cathlamet over a distance of 3.84 miles (6.18 km). The route connects Westport, Oregon, which is served by the county ferry, and Cathlamet. The highway was referred to as Secondary State Highway 12F (SSH 12F) from 1943 until 1964.

SR 409 crosses the Cathlamet Channel on the Julia Butler Hansen Bridge, completed in August 1939. The bridge is named after former U.S. representative Julia Butler Hansen, who served from 1960 until 1974 representing the third congressional district including Wahkiakum County.

== Route description ==
SR 409 goes on a 3.84 miles (6.18 km) route north from the northern ferry dock of the Wahkiakum County Ferry on Puget Island, to SR 4, also referred to as the Ocean Beach Highway, in the county seat of Cathlamet. The route connects Westport, Oregon, which is served by the county ferry, and Cathlamet. The Washington State Department of Transportation (WSDOT) found in 2007 that, on average, more than 2,800 motorists utilize the road daily south of the northern terminus in Cathlamet, making the highway the second busiest state route in the county, after SR 4 at Boege Road, which more than 4,100 motorists utilize daily.

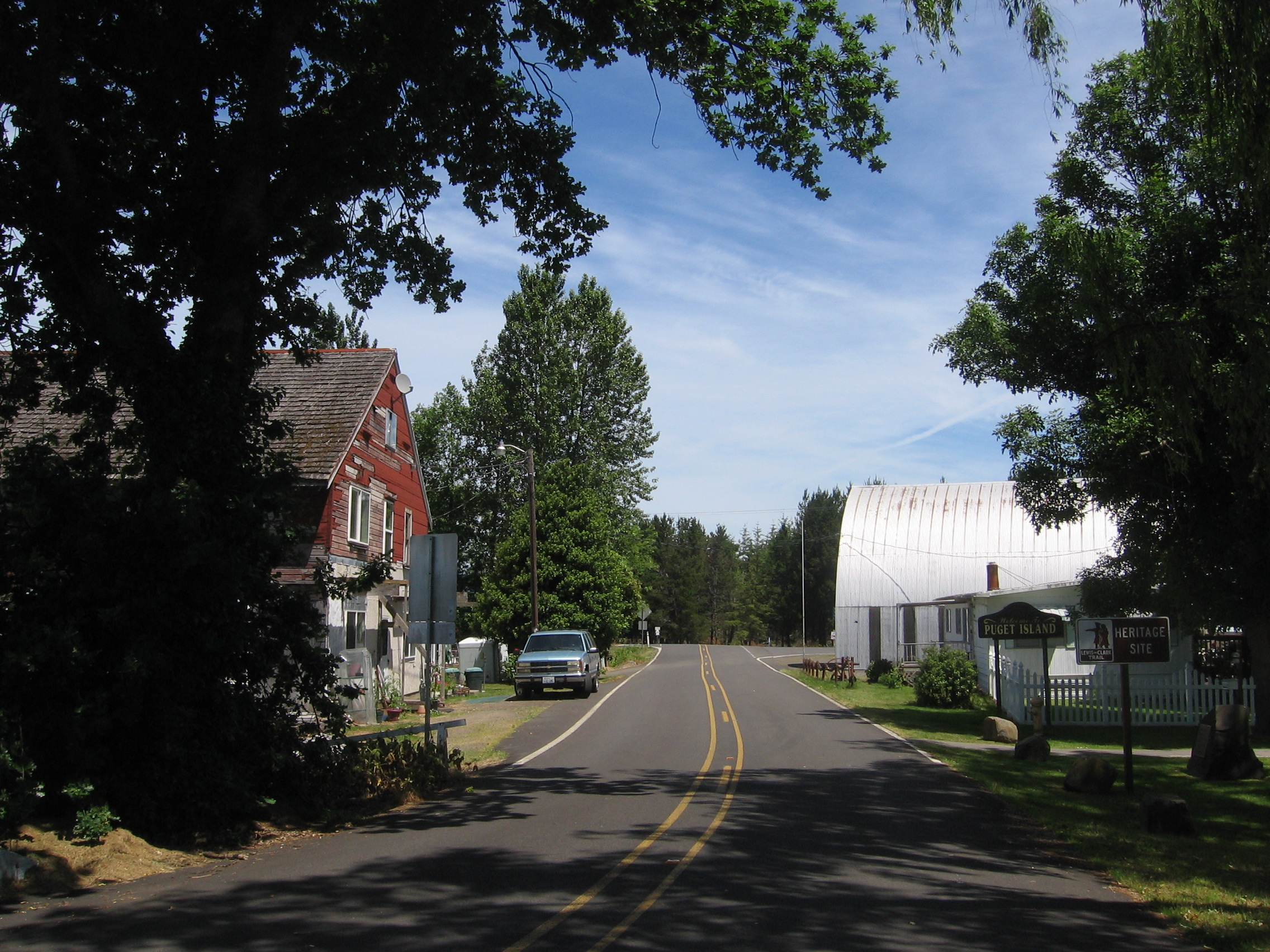
SR 409 northbound on Puget Island towards the Julia Butler Hansen Bridge and Cathlamet.

SR 409 originates at the ferry dock on Puget Island which serves as the northern end of the Wahkiakum County Ferry. From the dock, the road travels north past the island's interior, before turning northwest to parallel the Cathlamet Channel. After intersecting Little Island Road, the highway immediately turns onto the Julia Butler Hansen Bridge spanning over the Cathlamet Channel. Once SR 409 exits off the bridge in Cathlamet, it becomes Front Street. Later, after intersecting River Street and Columbia Street, the highway becomes Main Street, the designation used from the intersection point to SR 4.

=== Ferry ===
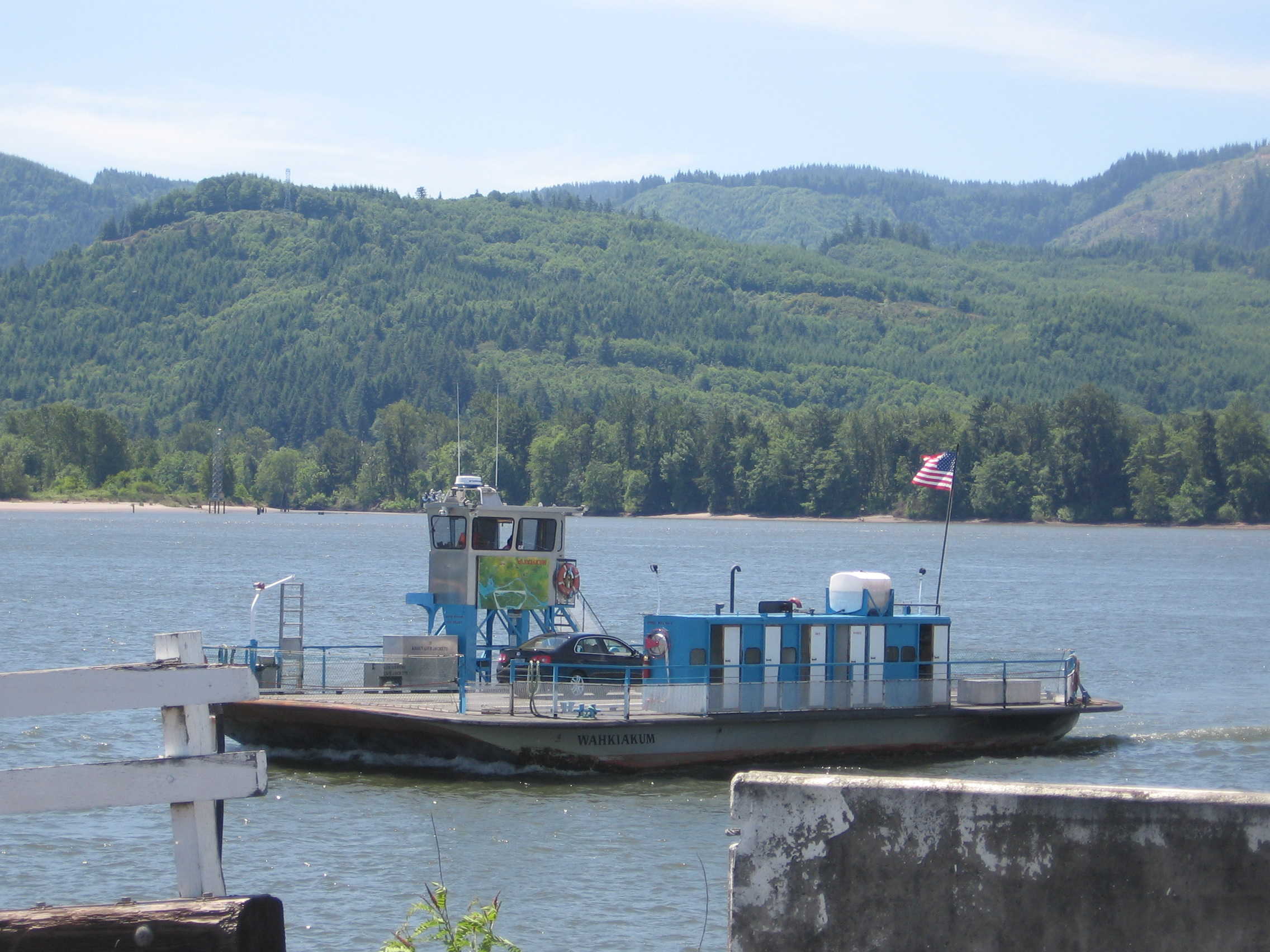
The Wahkiakum County Ferry leaving the Westport, Oregon dock towards the Puget Island dock, the southern terminus of SR 409.

The year-round Wahkiakum County Ferry, designated Wahkiakum, runs from Westport, Oregon to the southern terminus of SR 409 at Puget Island. The ferry connects SR 409 to a road that connects to U.S. Route 30, which runs 477.02 miles (767.69 km) across Oregon; Wahkiakum County began running the ferry in 1962, on a route from Westport to Puget Island. The ferry travels more than eighteen trips per day, and runs from 5:00 am to 10:15 pm and holds up to nine vehicles. The ferry costs 50¢ for foot passengers, $1 for bicycles, $2 for motorcycles, and $3 for passenger cars and other vehicles under 20 feet (6.1 m). Vehicles over 20 feet (6.1 m) cannot travel on the ferry; motorhomes, large trucks and trailers are allowed on the ferry for a fare determined by length. Frequent Traveler Tickets can be purchased for $40 (22 trips) and $75 (44 trips) for vehicles under 20 feet (6.1 m). The first ferry launched in June 1925, when Walter Coates bought two ferries and began to operate them on two different routes, including the current one and a route from Puget Island to Cathlamet. The county later replaced the Puget Island – Cathlamet route with the Puget Island – Cathlamet Bridge in 1939.

== History ==
=== Bridge (1925–1939) ===
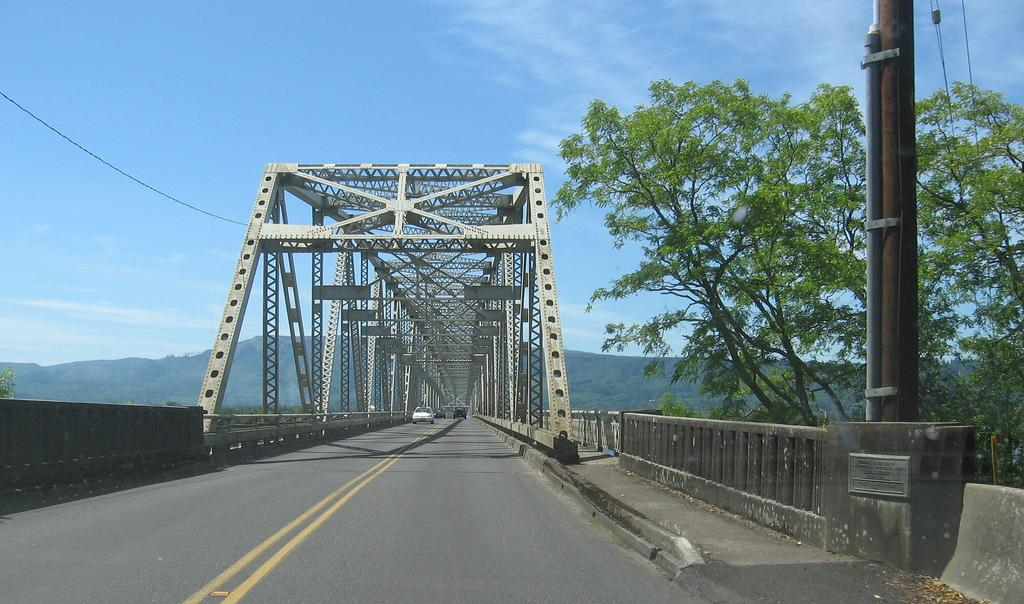
The Julia Butler Hansen Bridge southbound from Cathlamet towards Puget Island.

In June 1925, Walter Coates began a ferry service across the Cathlamet Channel, from Puget Island to Cathlamet. The original ferry was later replaced by the Cathlamet, which could load cars. In 1932, Coates sold the ferry service, fearing that the newly completed Ocean Beach Highway, soon to be SR 4, would press drivers to the competing Astoria–Megler Ferry. In 1939, the year the Julia Butler Hansen Bridge opened, ferry service ceased on the Puget Island – Cathlamet run.

The Julia Butler Hansen Bridge, which currently carries the route of SR 409, which will be designated in 1964, from Puget Island to Cathlamet, opened in August 1939. The bridge, initially named the Puget Island – Cathlamet Bridge, was later renamed to honor Julia Butler Hansen, who served in the Washington House of Representatives from 1939 until 1960, and U.S. representative for the third congressional district from 1960 until 1974.

Lacey V. Murrow, R. W. Finke and Clark H. Eldridge designed the bridge, which spanned 2,433 feet (742 m) and consisted of four steel spans when first constructed. Steel comprises the majority of the truss bridge's structure. President Franklin D. Roosevelt commenced the five-day celebration of the bridge's opening with a ribbon cutting, remotely controlled from the White House via telegraph.

=== Designation (1943–present) ===
The shield of SSH 12F (1943–1964)

After a reconstruction of the Primary and Secondary Highways in 1943, the road that later became SR 409 was established as Secondary State Highway 12F (SSH 12F). SSH 12F became SR 409 in 1964 during the 1964 highway renumbering, in which the WSDOT replaced the previous system of Primary and Secondary Highways with a new system called State Routes, which is still in use today.

== Major intersections ==
The entire highway is in Wahkiakum County.

Location	mi	km	Destinations	Notes
Puget Island	0.00	0.00	Wahkiakum County Ferry – Westport, OR	Southern terminus
Cathlamet Channel	2.99	4.81	Julia Butler Hansen Bridge	
Cathlamet	3.84	6.18	SR 4 (Ocean Beach Highway) – Naselle, Longview, Kelso	Northern terminus
1.000 mi = 1.609 km; 1.000 km = 0.621 mi
