= Ella Wintler =

Washington State politician

Speaker pro tempore of the Washington House of Representatives
- In office January 14, 1963 – January 11, 1965
- Preceded by: Jeanette Testu
- Succeeded by: Avery Garrett

Member of the Washington House of Representatives from the 49th district
- In office 1959–1965 Serving with W. E. Carty (1959–1961); Robert M. Schaefer (1959–1965); William C. Klein (1961–1965)
- Preceded by: None (no district 1933–1957)
- Succeeded by: William C. Klein; Daniel G. Marsh; Robert M. Schaefer

Member of the Washington House of Representatives from the 17th district
- In office 1951–1959 Serving with W. E. Carty (1951–1953; 1955–1959); Fred Mason (1953–1955); Mark Holliday (1951–1953; 1955–1957); Morris S. Swan (1953–1955); William C. Klein (1957–1959)
- Preceded by: W. E. Carty; Mark Holliday; Abner B. McPherson
- Succeeded by: Mildred E. Henry
- In office 1947–1949 Serving with W. E. Carty; Fred Mason
- Preceded by: W. E. Carty; William H. Jones; C. L. Smith
- Succeeded by: W. E. Carty; Mark Holliday; Abner B. McPherson
- In office 1943–1945 Serving with Fred Mason; Austin B. McCoy
- Preceded by: W. E. Carty; Abner B. McPherson; Marion Sexton
- Succeeded by: W. E. Carty; William H. Jones; C. L. Smith
- In office 1939–1941 Serving with W. E. Carty; Alex Gabrielsen
- Preceded by: A. W. Clark; Alex Gabrielsen; R. D. Wiswall
- Succeeded by: W. E. Carty; Abner B. McPherson; Marion Sexton

Personal details
- Born: August 10, 1885 Vancouver, Washington, U.S.
- Died: April 17, 1975 (aged 89) Vancouver, Washington, U.S.
- Party: Republican
- Education: University of Washington (A.B., A.M.)
- Occupation: Teacher

Ella Wintler (August 10, 1885 - April 17, 1975) was an American politician who served as a member of the Washington House of Representatives for 20 years including several non-consecutive terms from 1939 to 1965. She represented Washington's 17th and then 49th legislative districts as a Republican. In her final term in office (1963–65), she was elected Speaker Pro Tempore.

== Early life and education ==
Wintler was born and lived most of her life in Vancouver, Washington. She was the youngest of nine children to father John Jacob Wintler, a Swiss immigrant, and mother Sarah Butler Wintler, who arrived in Vancouver in 1878 having driven mules there from Carthage, Missouri.

A 1903 graduate of Vancouver High School, she then taught at several schools before enrolling at the University of Washington. She graduated with her A.B. and A.M. degrees in 1910 and then taught German in Mount Vernon, Washington until 1916. She then returned to Vancouver and taught German, English, and social studies at Vancouver High until retiring in 1950.

== Legislative career ==
Wintler was first elected to the Washington House of Representatives in 1938, her term beginning in 1939. With straight-ticket voting, she repeatedly won election in the years of federal midterm elections (1938, 1942, and 1946) and then lost her seat to Democrats in the next elections two years later (1940, 1944, and 1948), when U.S. Presidents Franklin D. Roosevelt and then Harry S. Truman were on the ballot. After her fourth non-consecutive term (1951 to 1953) she finally won back-to-back elections with her victory in 1952. Thereafter, she held a seat continuously until the end of her legislative career 1965.

Though viewed as a "staunch Republican", she considered herself a moderate conservative and would not automatically vote with her party. For example, as a constituent and customer of Clark County PUD, she supported public power, in contrast to Republican colleagues from Eastern Washington, who she said viewed it as radical to support anything but private power. However, she was vehemently anti-Communist in a time when the Communist Party still held political influence and seats in Washington's legislature. She referred to the I.W.W. (Industrial Workers of the World) as the "I Won't Works".

She served on a wide range of committees over her 20 years in office. Her leadership positions included chair of the Forestry, State Lands and Buildings Committee (1947–49); chair of the License Committee (1953–55); and vice-chair of the State Government Committee (1961–63). In 1969, Governor Albert Rosellini appointed her to the State Expenditures Advisory Council. In her final term, her colleagues elected her Speaker Pro Tempore of the House in thanks for her long service to the state—longer than any other member of the House.
