= Julia Butler Hansen Bridge =

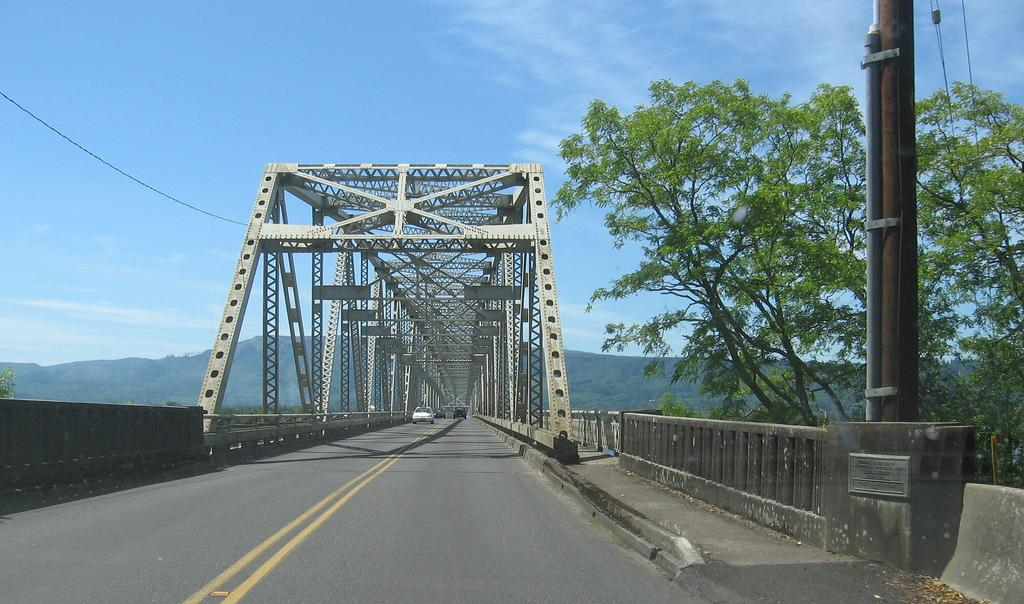
- The Julia Butler Hansen Bridge as seen southbound from Cathlamet, Washington.
- Coordinates: 46.195555°N 123.384265°W
- Carries: 2 lanes of SR 409
- Crosses: Columbia River
- Locale: Cathlamet, Washington
- Maintained by: Washington State Department of Transportation

Characteristics
- Design: cantilever through-truss, concrete segmental bridge
- Total length: 2,433 feet (742 m)
- Longest span: 400 feet (120 m)
- Clearance below: 60 feet (18 m) at high tide

History
- Opened: August 1939

Location
- Interactive map of Julia Butler Hansen Bridge

The Julia Butler Hansen Bridge in Wahkiakum County, in the U.S. state of Washington, connects Cathlamet to Puget Island. It spans the Cathlamet Channel of the Columbia River. The Wahkiakum County Ferry connects Puget Island to Westport, Oregon. The bridge was named after former United States Congresswoman Julia Butler Hansen, who represented Washington from 1960 to 1974.
