= Jeanette Testu =

Washington State politician

Speaker pro tempore of the Washington House of Representatives
- In office January 9, 1961 – January 14, 1963
- Preceded by: Julia Butler Hansen
- Succeeded by: Ella Wintler

Member of the Washington House of Representatives from the 34th district
- In office January 10, 1949 – January 14, 1963 Serving with Max Wedekind (1949–1953; 1955–1963); Charles A. Richey (1953–1955)
- Preceded by: Charles A. Richey; Max Wedekind
- Succeeded by: Robert D. Eberle; Max Wedekind
- In office January 11, 1943 – January 8, 1945 Serving with H. D. Hall
- Preceded by: Howard Doherty; H. D. Hall
- Succeeded by: H. D. Hall; Max Wedekind

Personal details
- Born: 1900 Pierre, South Dakota, U.S.
- Died: January 10, 1964 (aged 63–64) Mexico City, Mexico
- Party: Democratic
- Education: Normal school (graduate)
- Occupation: Teacher

Jeanette Testu (1900 – January 10, 1964) was an American politician who served eight terms in the Washington House of Representatives between 1943 and 1963. In her last term, she served as Speaker Pro Tempore. She represented Washington's 34th legislative district as a Democrat. She served on numerous committees in her time in the legislature, including terms as chair of the Transportation Committee (1949–1951), Colleges and Universities Committee (1951–1953), and Memorials Committee (1953–1955).

== Beyond the legislature ==
Testu was born in Pierre, South Dakota. She married in 1920 and had three children. She ran unsuccessfully for Seattle City Council in 1944 and 1954, served as a Deputy Sheriff of King County from 1957 to 1960, and was a Democratic National Committeewoman. She also served on the World's Fair Commission starting when it was expanded in 1961, where she was the only woman.

She was affiliated with numerous organizations, including the American Legion, Business and Professional Women, Eagles, Elks, and Supreme Emblem Club, as well as a community service role with the YMCA. In 1961, the State Federation of Democratic Women's Clubs named here Woman of the Year.

Testu died of a heart attack in Mexico City on January 10, 1964.
