= Skamokawa Valley, Washington =

- CDP
- Location within Washington (state)
- Coordinates: 46°18′25″N 123°26′15″W
- Country: United States
- State: Washington
- County: Wahkiakum

Area
  - Total: 28.409 sq mi (73.580 km^{2})
  - Land: 28.192 sq mi (73.018 km^{2})
  - Water: 0.217 sq mi (0.562 km^{2}) 0.76%
- Elevation: 240 ft (73 m)

Population (2020)
  - Total: 487
- Population as of 2020 U.S. Census
- Time zone: UTC−8 (PST)
  - Summer (DST): UTC−7 (PDT)
- ZIP Code: 98647
- Area code(s): 360, 564
- FIPS code: 53-64755
- GNIS feature ID: 2585038

Skamokawa Valley is a census-designated place (CDP) in Wahkiakum County, Washington, north of the town of Cathlamet. As of the 2020 census, Skamokawa Valley had a population of 487. The CDP includes the Sleepy Hollow community. The Skamokawa Valley community is part of the Wahkiakum School District, a K-12 school district of about 430 students. The unincorporated community of Skamokawa lies directly to the south.

The name of the CDP comes from Wahkiakum Chief Skamokawa who met with Meriwether Lewis and William Clark while their expedition spent the winter of 1805–06 at Fort Clatsop. His name, Skamokawa, is a Chinook word meaning “smoke over the water,” a reference to the area's foggy climate.

== Geography ==
According to the United States Census Bureau, the Skamokawa Valley CDP has a total area of 28.41 square miles (73.6 km^{2}), of which, 28.19 square miles (73.0 km^{2}) of it is land and 0.22 square miles (0.57 km^{2}) of it (0.76%) is water.

== Demographics ==
Historical population
| Census | Pop. | Note | %± |
|---|---|---|---|
| 2010 | 401 | | — |
| 2020 | 487 | | 21.4% |
U.S. Decennial Census; 2000 2010

Skamokawa Valley first appeared as a census designated place in the 2010 U.S. census.

=== Racial and ethnic composition ===
Skamokawa Valley CDP, Washington – Racial and ethnic composition Note: the US Census treats Hispanic/Latino as an ethnic category. This table excludes Latinos from the racial categories and assigns them to a separate category. Hispanics/Latinos may be of any race.
| Race / Ethnicity (NH = Non-Hispanic) | Pop 2010 | Pop 2020 | % 2010 | % 2020 |
|---|---|---|---|---|
| White alone (NH) | 374 | 409 | 93.27% | 83.98% |
| Black or African American alone (NH) | 0 | 3 | 0.00% | 0.62% |
| Native American or Alaska Native alone (NH) | 3 | 14 | 0.75% | 2.87% |
| Asian alone (NH) | 1 | 2 | 0.25% | 0.41% |
| Native Hawaiian or Pacific Islander alone (NH) | 0 | 0 | 0.00% | 0.00% |
| Other race alone (NH) | 0 | 10 | 0.00% | 2.05% |
| Mixed race or Multiracial (NH) | 13 | 24 | 3.24% | 4.93% |
| Hispanic or Latino (any race) | 10 | 25 | 2.49% | 5.13% |
| Total | 401 | 487 | 100.00% | 100.00% |

=== 2020 census ===
As of the 2020 census, there were 487 people, 217 housing units, and 150 families. There were 416 White people, 3 African Americans, 14 Native Americans, 3 Asians, 0 Pacific Islanders, 15 people from some other race, and 36 from two or more races. 25 people were of Hispanic or Latino origin.

The ancestry of Skamokawa Valley was 29.7% German, 15.7% Irish, 9.6% Scottish, 9.2% English, 4.0% French, and 2.0% Norwegian.

The median age was 64.1 years old. 32.9% of the population were older than 65 years old, with 6.4% being between the ages of 65 and 74, 23.7% being between the ages of 75 and 84, and 2.8% being older than 85.

The median household income was $16,934, with families having a median income of $27,917. 50.2% of the population were in poverty, with 74.9% of people between the ages of 18 and 64 in poverty.

=== 2010 census ===
As of the census of 2010, there were 401 people, 159 households, and 104 families residing in the CDP. The population density was 14.1 people per square mile (5.4 people/km^{2}). There were 200 housing units at an average density of 7.0 per square mile (2.7/km^{2}). The racial makeup of the CDP was 93.8% White, 0.0% African American, 1.0% Native American, 0.2% Asian, 0.0% Pacific Islander, 1.5% from other races, and 3.5% from two or more races. Hispanic or Latino of any race were 2.5% of the population.

There were 159 households, out of which 26.4% had children under the age of 18 living with them, 52.2% were married couples living together, 5.7% had a female householder with no husband present, and 34.6% were non-families. 30.2% of all households were made up of individuals, and 14.4% had someone living alone who was 65 years of age or older. The average household size was 2.52 and the average family size was 3.11.

In the CDP, the age distribution of the population shows 25.7% under the age of 18, 4.0% from 18 to 24, 20.9% from 25 to 44, 33.7% from 45 to 64, and 15.7% who were 65 years of age or older. The median age was 44.5 years. For every 100 females, there were 97.5 males. For every 100 females age 18 and over, there were 102.7 males.
