= Cathlamet, Washington =

Cathlamet
- Town
- Cathlamet, Washington
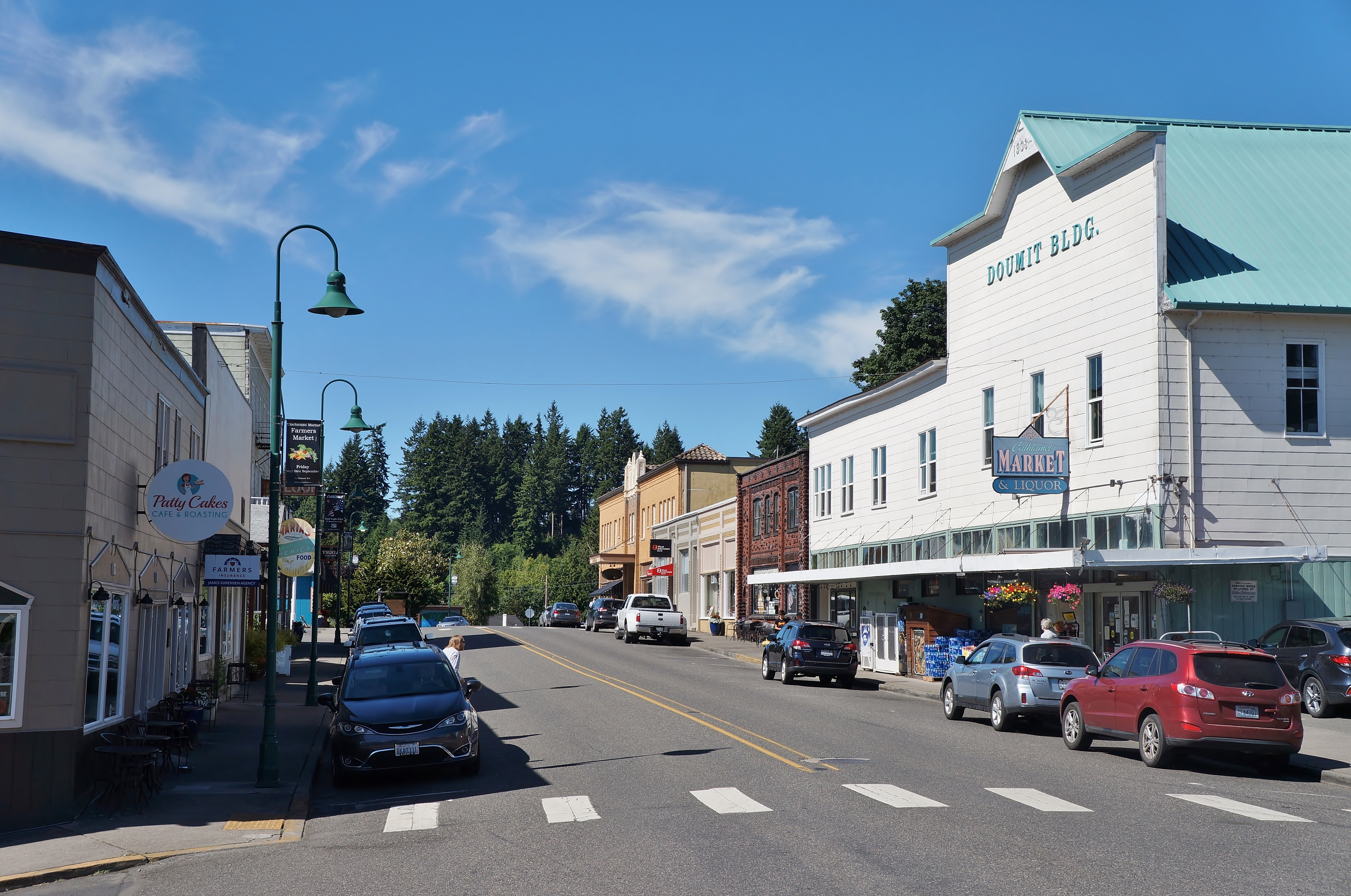
- Downtown Cathlamet

- Location of Cathlamet, Washington
- Coordinates: 46°12′06″N 123°22′42″W
- Country: United States
- State: Washington
- County: Wahkiakum

Government
  - Mayor: David Olson

Area
  - Total: 0.51 sq mi (1.32 km^{2})
  - Land: 0.51 sq mi (1.31 km^{2})
  - Water: 0 sq mi (0.00 km^{2}) 1.46%
- Elevation: 56 ft (17 m)

Population (2020)
  - Total: 560
  - Density: 1,100/sq mi (430/km^{2})
- Time zone: UTC-8 (Pacific (PST))
  - Summer (DST): UTC-7 (PDT)
- ZIP Code: 98612
- Area code: 360, 564
- FIPS code: 53-10635
- GNIS feature ID: 2413181
- Website: Town of Cathlamet

Cathlamet /kæθˈlæmɪt/ is a town located along the Ocean Beach Highway in Wahkiakum County, Washington, United States, where it is the county seat. The population was 560 at the 2020 census.

== History ==
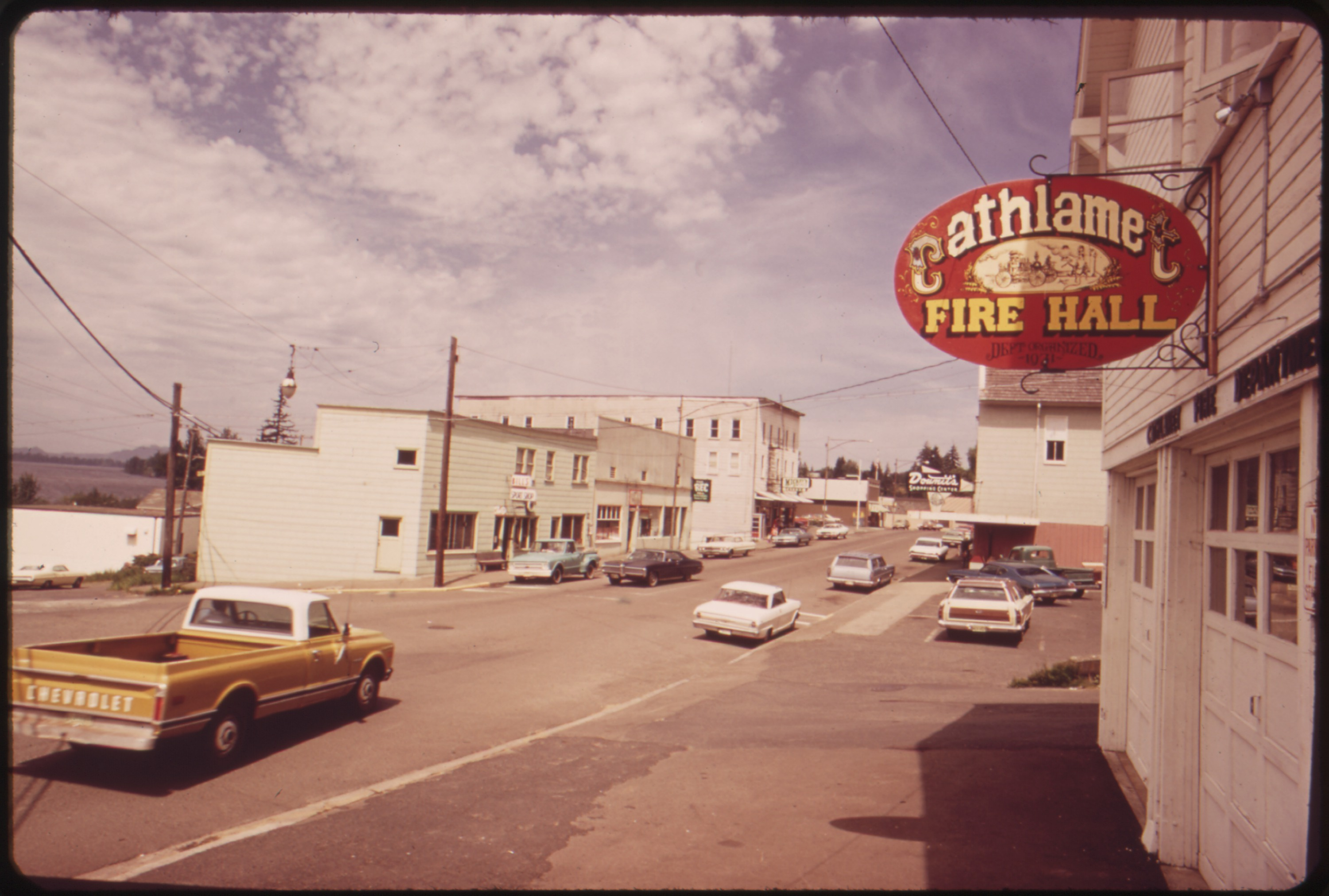
Cathlamet in 1973 (Main Street from Columbia Street)

Cathlamet was the largest, or one of the largest, villages of Columbia River Native Americans west of the Cascade Mountains, and the home of the Kathlamet people. "Cathlamet was sighted in 1792 by Lt. W.R. Broughton, while verifying Capt. Robert Gray's reported exploration of the Columbia River." This village of cedar houses included 300-400 inhabitants when visited by Lewis and Clark.

In 1846, James Albion Birnie became the first permanent white settler at Cathlamet, moving there after a career with the Hudson's Bay Company. He set up a trading post, remnants of which were reported still standing in 1906. "Birnie named the area Birnie's Retreat. The name was later changed to Cathlamet in 1851."

Cathlamet was officially incorporated on February 18, 1907. In 1938, the Julia Butler Hansen Bridge was built to carry what is now State Route 409 across the Columbia River's Cathlamet Channel to Puget Island.

== Geography ==
Cathlamet lies on the Columbia River in southwestern Washington across from Puget Island and Oregon. The Pacific Coast to the west and Longview to the east are accessible via State Route 4. Another highway, State Route 409, crosses to Puget Island and connects with the county-operated Wahkiakum County Ferry, which travels over the Columbia River to Westport, Oregon.

According to the United States Census Bureau, the town has a total area of 0.50 square miles (1.29 km^{2}), of which, 0.49 square miles (1.27 km^{2}) is land and 0.01 square miles (0.03 km^{2}) is water.

=== Climate ===
Climate data for Cathlamet, Washington
| Month | Jan | Feb | Mar | Apr | May | Jun | Jul | Aug | Sep | Oct | Nov | Dec | Year |
|---|---|---|---|---|---|---|---|---|---|---|---|---|---|
| Mean daily maximum °F (°C) | 45 (7) | 50 (10) | 54 (12) | 59 (15) | 64 (18) | 68 (20) | 74 (23) | 75 (24) | 71 (22) | 62 (17) | 50 (10) | 45 (7) | 60 (15) |
| Mean daily minimum °F (°C) | 31 (−1) | 33 (1) | 35 (2) | 38 (3) | 43 (6) | 47 (8) | 51 (11) | 51 (11) | 46 (8) | 39 (4) | 35 (2) | 32 (0) | 40 (5) |
| Average precipitation inches (mm) | 8.28 (210) | 6.75 (171) | 5.94 (151) | 4.08 (104) | 2.69 (68) | 1.83 (46) | 0.84 (21) | 0.96 (24) | 2.22 (56) | 4.08 (104) | 8.84 (225) | 8.98 (228) | 55.49 (1,408) |
Source: The Weather Channel

== Demographics ==
Historical population
| Census | Pop. | Note | %± |
|---|---|---|---|
| 1880 | 133 | | — |
| 1910 | 362 | | — |
| 1920 | 422 | | 16.6% |
| 1930 | 537 | | 27.3% |
| 1940 | 621 | | 15.6% |
| 1950 | 501 | | −19.3% |
| 1960 | 615 | | 22.8% |
| 1970 | 647 | | 5.2% |
| 1980 | 635 | | −1.9% |
| 1990 | 508 | | −20.0% |
| 2000 | 565 | | 11.2% |
| 2010 | 532 | | −5.8% |
| 2020 | 560 | | 5.3% |
U.S. Decennial Census

=== 2010 census ===
As of the 2010 census, there were 532 people, 258 households, and 136 families residing in the town. The population density was 1,085.7 inhabitants per square mile (419.2/km^{2}). There were 296 housing units at an average density of 604.1 units per square mile (233.2 units/km^{2}). The racial makeup of the town was 94.7% White, 0.2% African American, 0.9% Native American, 1.1% Asian, 0.8% from other races, and 2.3% from two or more races. Hispanic or Latino of any race were 3.4% of the population.

There were 258 households, of which 19.4% had children under the age of 18 living with them, 41.5% were married couples living together, 8.9% had a female householder with no husband present, 2.3% had a male householder with no wife present, and 47.3% were non-families. 40.7% of all households were made up of individuals, and 21.7% had someone living alone who was 65 years of age or older. The average household size was 1.90 and the average family size was 2.52.

The median age in the town was 52.9 years. 15% of residents were under the age of 18; 4.2% were between the ages of 18 and 24; 19.6% were from 25 to 44; 30.2% were from 45 to 64; and 31% were 65 years of age or older. The gender makeup of the town was 45.3% male and 54.7% female.

=== 2000 census ===
As of the 2000 census, there were 565 people, 246 households, and 138 families residing in the town. The population density was 1,426.2 people per square mile (550.7 people/km^{2}). There were 278 housing units at an average density of 701.7 units per square mile (270.9 units/km^{2}). The racial makeup of the town was 94.16% White, 0.53% African American, 1.59% Native American, 0.88% Asian, 0.35% from other races, and 2.48% from two or more races. Hispanic or Latino of any race were 0.53% of the population.

There were 246 households, out of which 20.7% had children under the age of 18 living with them, 46.7% were married couples living together, 8.1% had a female householder with no husband present, and 43.5% were non-families. 38.6% of all households were made up of individuals, and 15.4% had someone living alone who was 65 years of age or older. The average household size was 2.06 and the average family size was 2.67.

In the town, the age distribution of the population shows 18.2% under the age of 18, 6.2% from 18 to 24, 20.0% from 25 to 44, 29.4% from 45 to 64, and 26.2% who were 65 years of age or older. The median age was 49 years. For every 100 females, there were 81.1 males. For every 100 females age 18 and over, there were 78.4 males.

The median income for a household in the town was $33,409, and the median income for a family was $47,917. Males had a median income of $35,625 versus $30,750 for females. The per capita income for the town was $18,588. About 9.6% of families and 15.1% of the population were below the poverty line, including 12.6% of those under age 18 and 3.8% of those age 65 or over.

== Arts and culture ==
=== Festivals and events ===
Cathlamet celebrates "Bald Eagle Days", a two-day, themed festival. Held usually in July, the event hosts a parade, street vendors, and an area for children's activities. The city's "Art in the Park" workshop, farmer's market, and the marina are incorporated into the event. The first Bald Eagle Days was held in 1982.

=== Historic buildings and sites ===
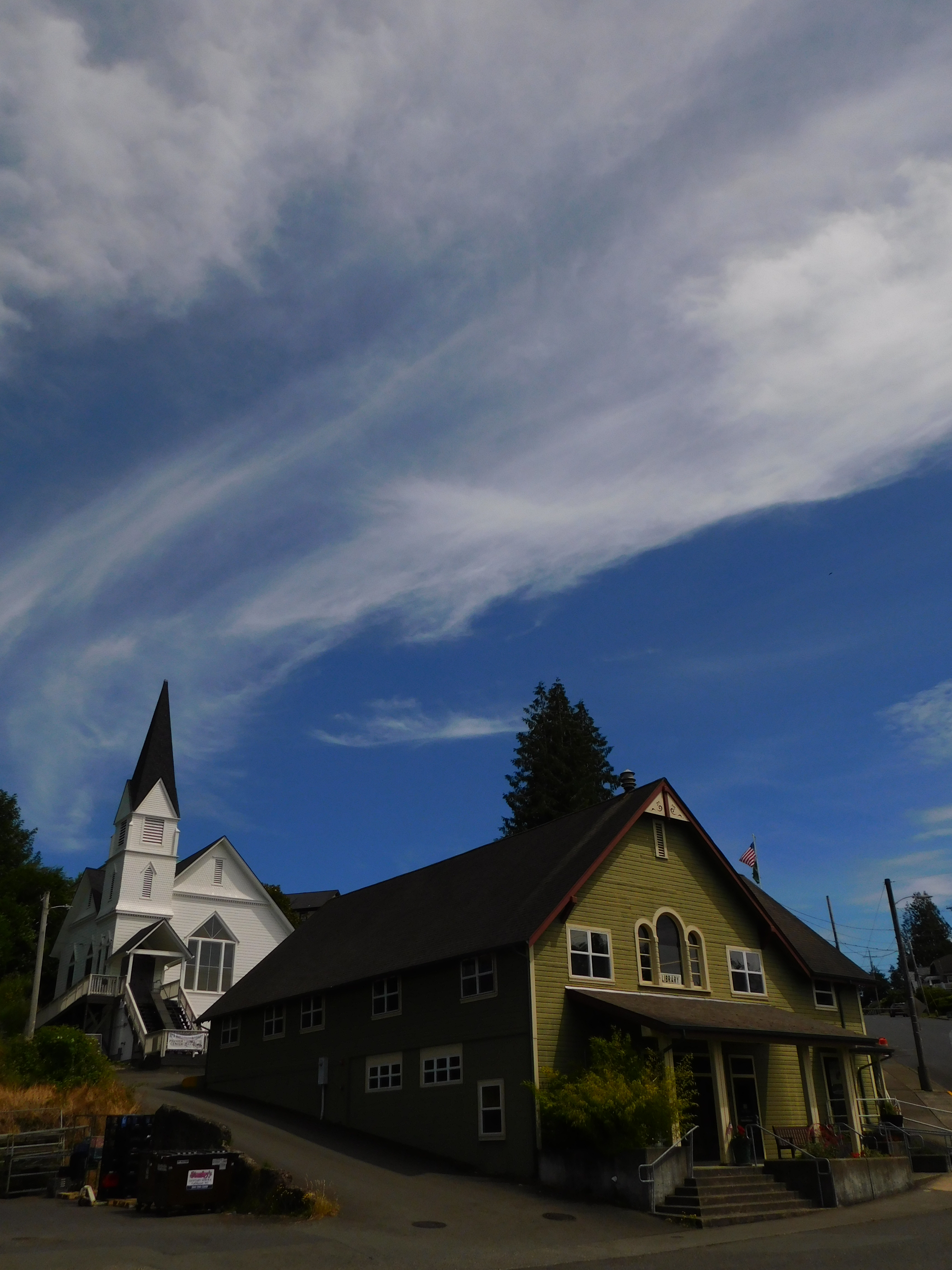
Cathlamet Public Library and Pioneer Center

In the downtown core resides the Pioneer Church, built in 1895.

=== Media ===
Films shot in Cathlamet include Come See the Paradise (1990), Snow Falling on Cedars (1999) and Men of Honor (2000).

As stated in the afterword of Tananarive Due's horror novel The Good House, the setting of Sacajawea, WA is based on Cathlamet.

== Education ==
Cathlamet is home to all schools, K-12, of the Wahkiakum School District. The district of about 430 students pulls students from Cathlamet, Upper Elochoman, Lower Elochoman, East Cathlamet, Puget Island, and Skamokawa Valley.

== Notable people ==
- James Birnie, town founder and fur trader
- Lilian Hale, Washington State Representative (2024)
- Julia Butler Hansen, politician and member of the United States House of Representatives from 1960 to 1974

== See also ==
- Kathlamet people
