= Pioneer Church =

Historic church in Washington, United States

- U.S. National Register of Historic Places
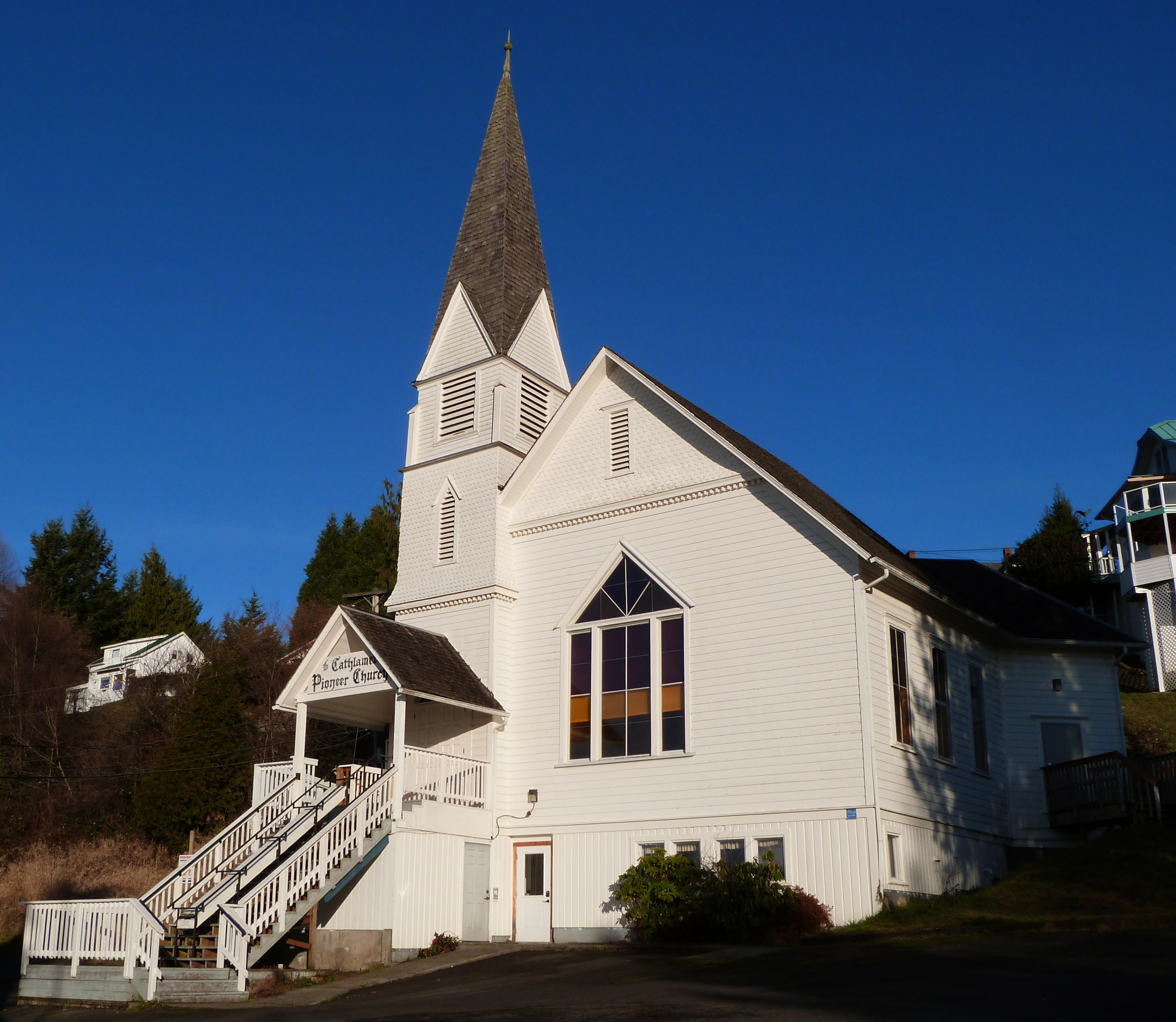
- The Pioneer Church in 2014

- Location within Washington (state) Location within the United States
- Location: 125 Columbia St., Cathlamet, Washington
- Coordinates: 46°12′05″N 123°23′01″W
- Area: less than one acre
- Built: 1895
- Architectural style: Northwest Style
- NRHP reference No.: 73001893
- Added to NRHP: April 11, 1973

Pioneer Church, also known as the Congregational Church, is a historic church in Cathlamet, Washington. It was built in 1895 and added to the National Register of Historic Places in 1973.

The building is currently used by the Pioneer Community Association.
