= Wahkiakum County ferry =

Ferry route between Oregon and Washington

Coordinates: 46°8′12.3″N 123°22′40.9″W

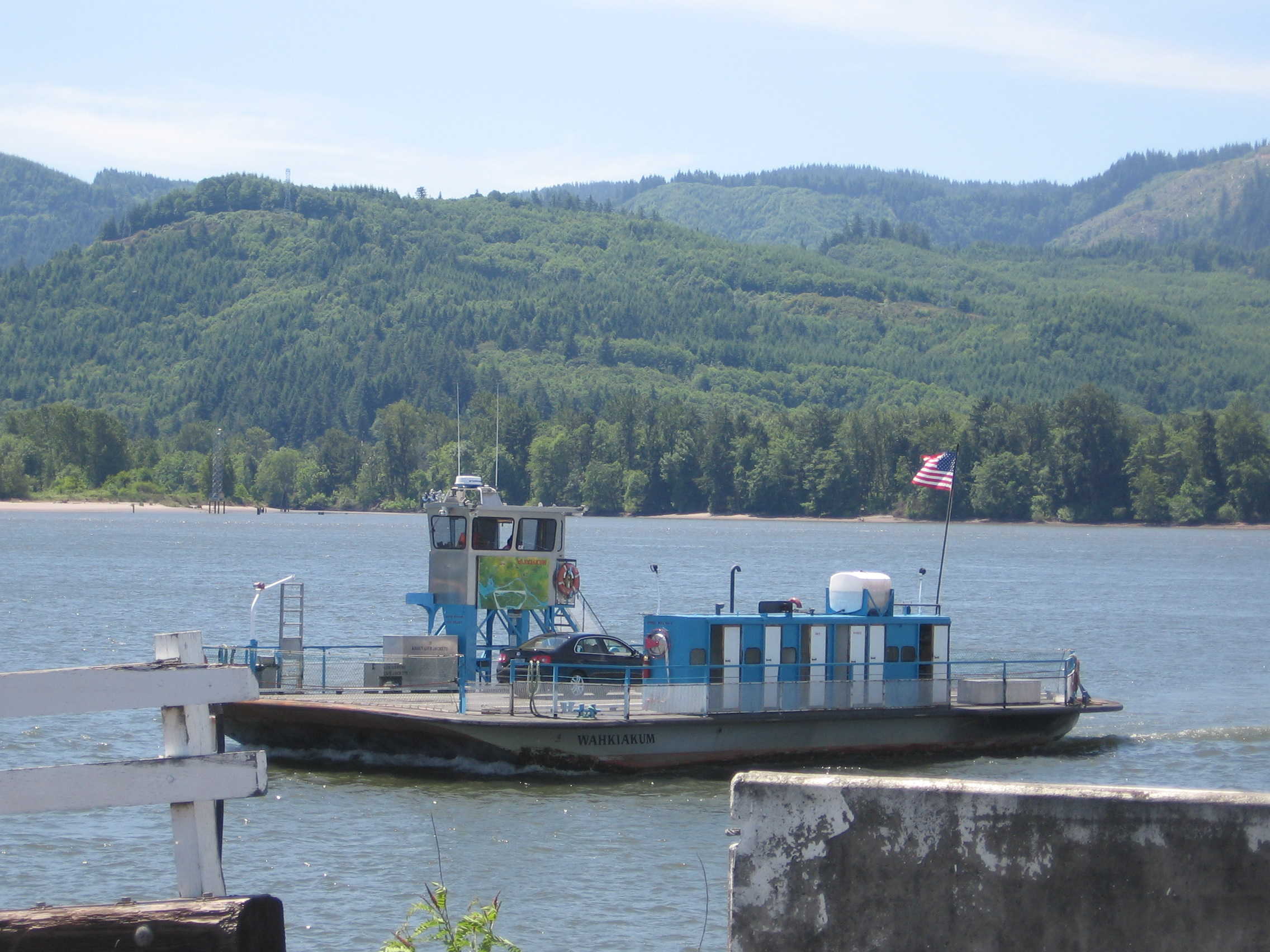
- The ferry Wahkiakum in 2007
- Waterway: Columbia River
- Carries: State Route 409
- Terminals: 2
- Operator: Wahkiakum County, Washington
- Began operation: June 25, 1925; 101 years ago
- System length: 1.4 miles (2.3 km)
- Travel time: 10 minutes
- Frequency: Hourly
- No. of lines: 1
- No. of vessels: 1 (Oscar B)

The Wahkiakum County ferry crosses the lower Columbia River between the U.S. states of Washington and Oregon, and is the last regularly scheduled car ferry to cross the Columbia River between the two states.

The ferry is located at the terminus of State Route 409, it departs from Puget Island, Washington, which the Julia Butler Hansen Bridge links to the mainland. SR 409 is a spur from State Route 4, and the ferry thus connects that highway to U.S. Route 30 in Oregon. Its status as an extension of SR 409 is why the state of Washington since 1969 has provided financial support for operation of the ferry.

As of May 2019, the ferry runs hourly (on the hour from the Washington side and 15 minutes after the hour from the Oregon side) from 5 a.m. to 10:15 p.m. 365 days a year. Lunch time service is sometimes interrupted.

== History ==
In 1990, the ferry temporarily had a 24-hour schedule following a landslide on State Route 4 at KM Mountain that destroyed a section of the highway.

A new Puget Island terminal was constructed in 2009–2010 after the state of Washington declared the existing structure deficient. It was paid for in part with federal stimulus funds.

During a scheduled eight-day closure of the Lewis and Clark Bridge (near Longview, Washington) in July 2023, service on the Wahkiakum County ferry was doubled to handle detour traffic. A priority line for first responders, healthcare workers, and medical appointment travel was set up to allow them to skip the queue.

== Vessels ==
=== Wahkiakum ===
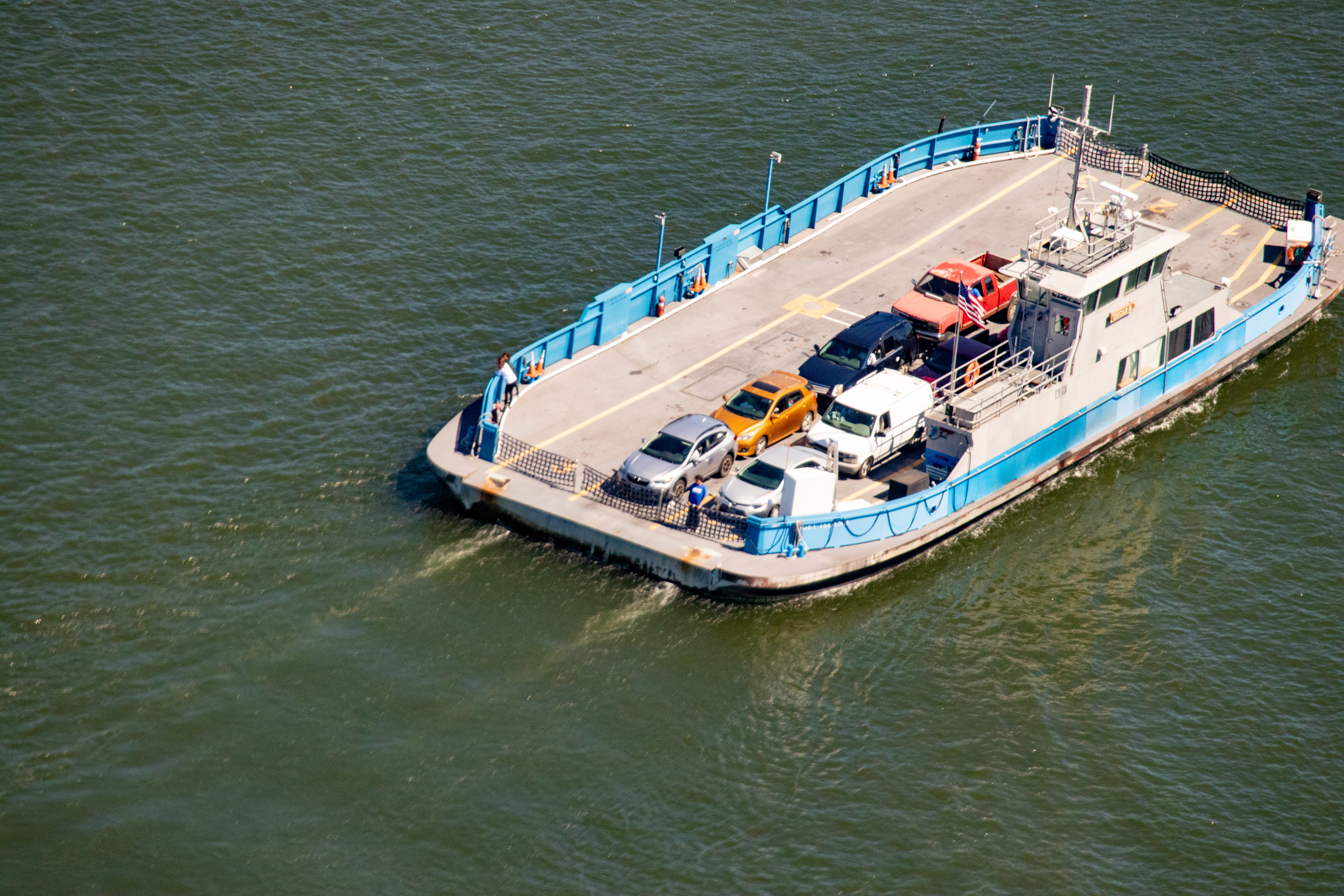
Ferry viewed from above in 2023

The ferry Wahkiakum had been operated by Wahkiakum County, Washington since 1962, between Cathlamet, Washington and Westport, Oregon. According to the Wahkiakum Chamber of Commerce, the ferry held nine cars and a ride across the Columbia took about ten minutes.

The Washington state government began providing an operating subsidy for the ferry in 1969 and studied an outright acquisition, but found that it would be of little statewide benefit.

=== Oscar B ===
In February 2015, the route got a new ferry, the Oscar B, operating a minimum 18 runs per day, every day of the year. It was named for ferryman Oscar Bergseng who worked full and part-time for 26 years on the Wahkiakum before retiring in 1966.

== Images ==
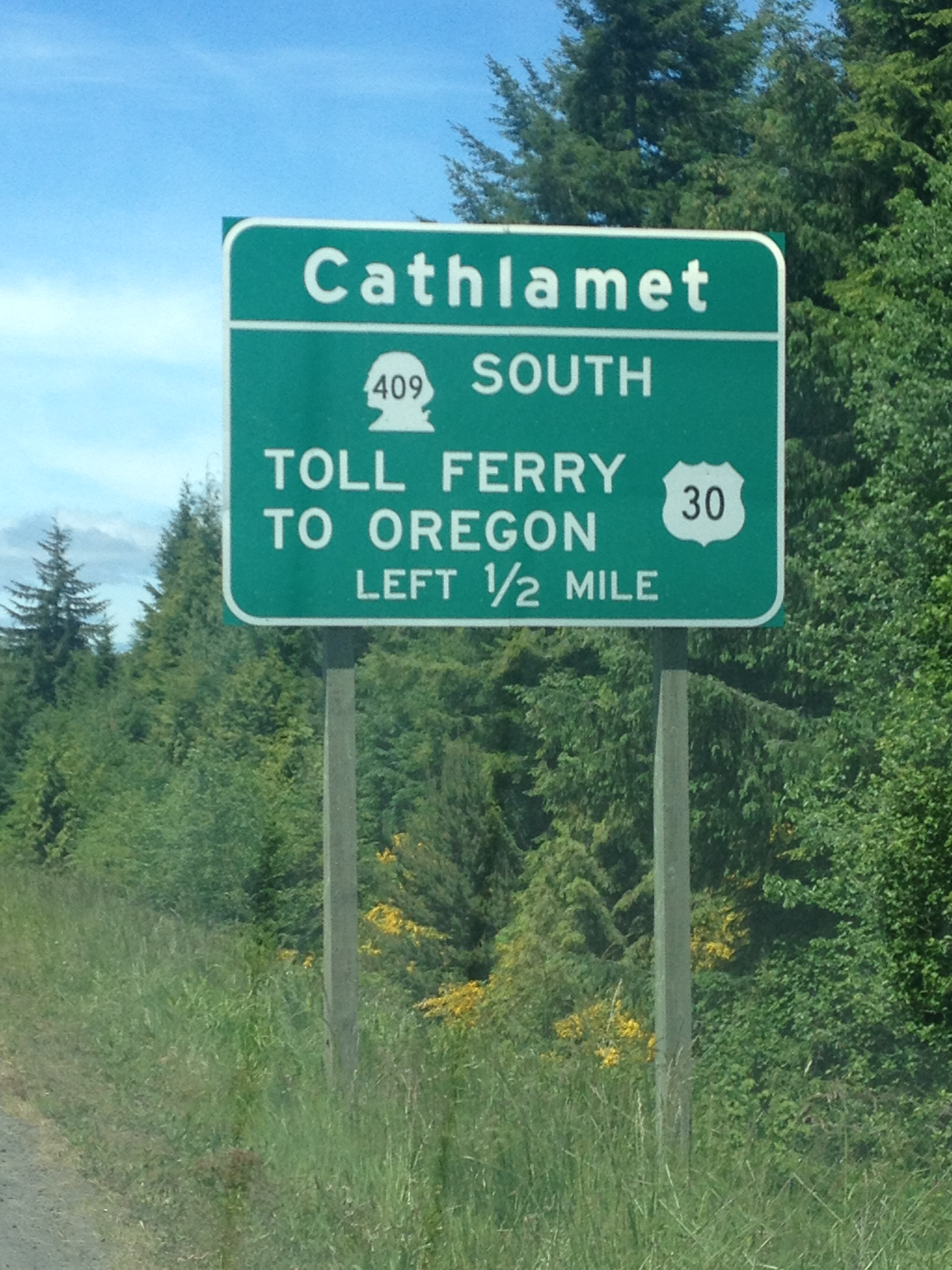
Cathlamet & Puget Island ferry road sign

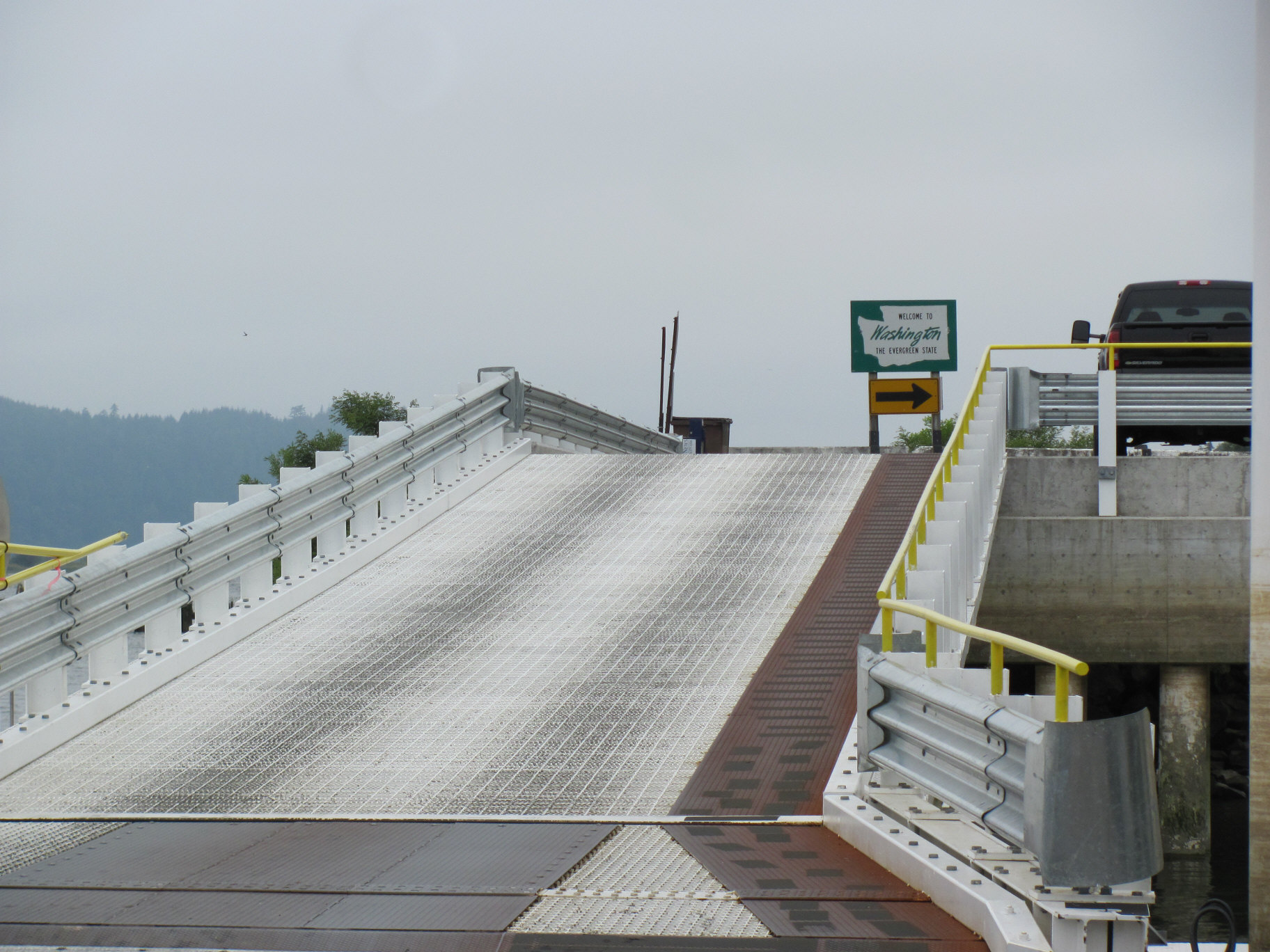
The ferry landing at Cathlamet, Washington

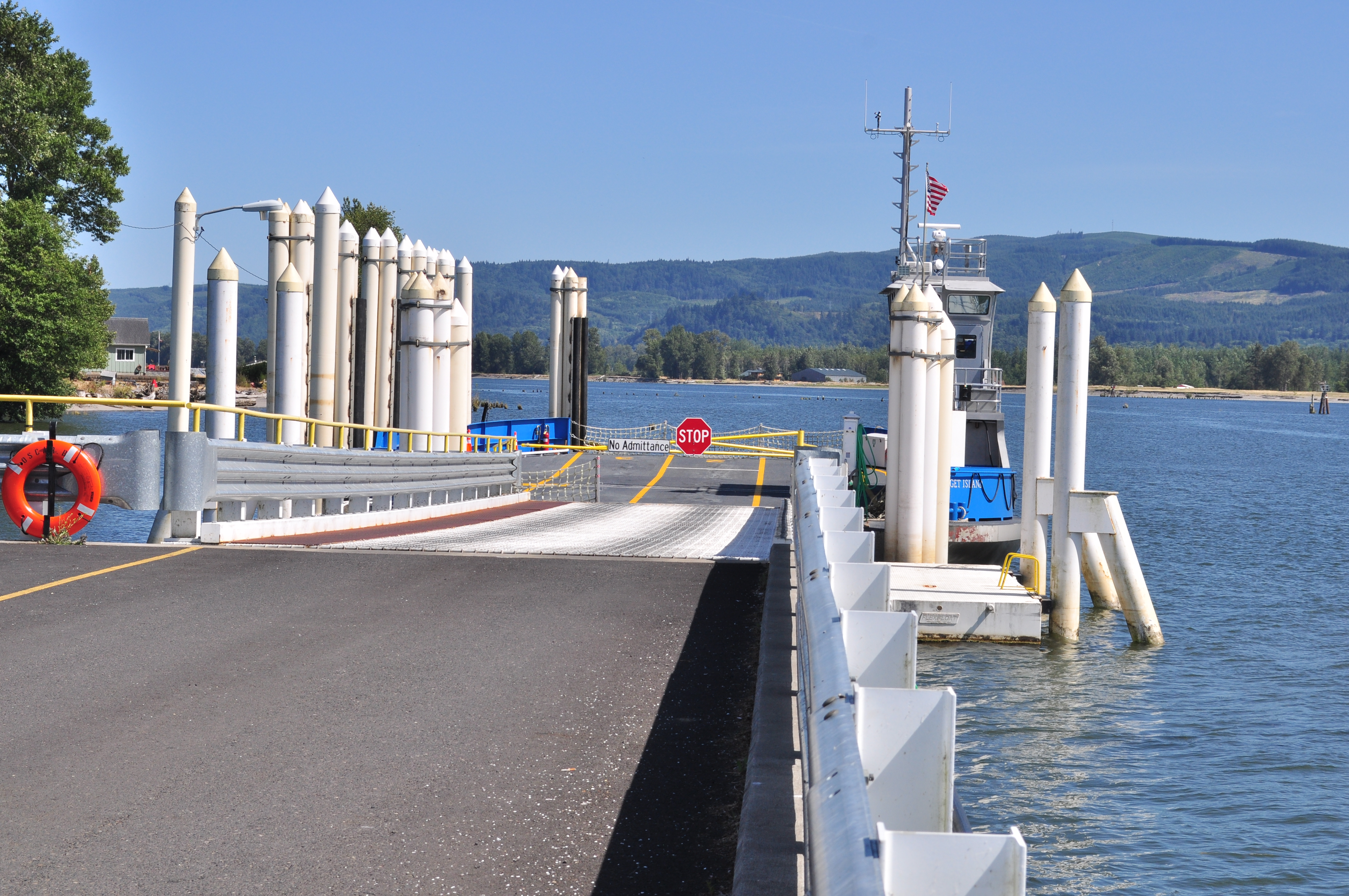
The ferry landing at Puget Island, WA

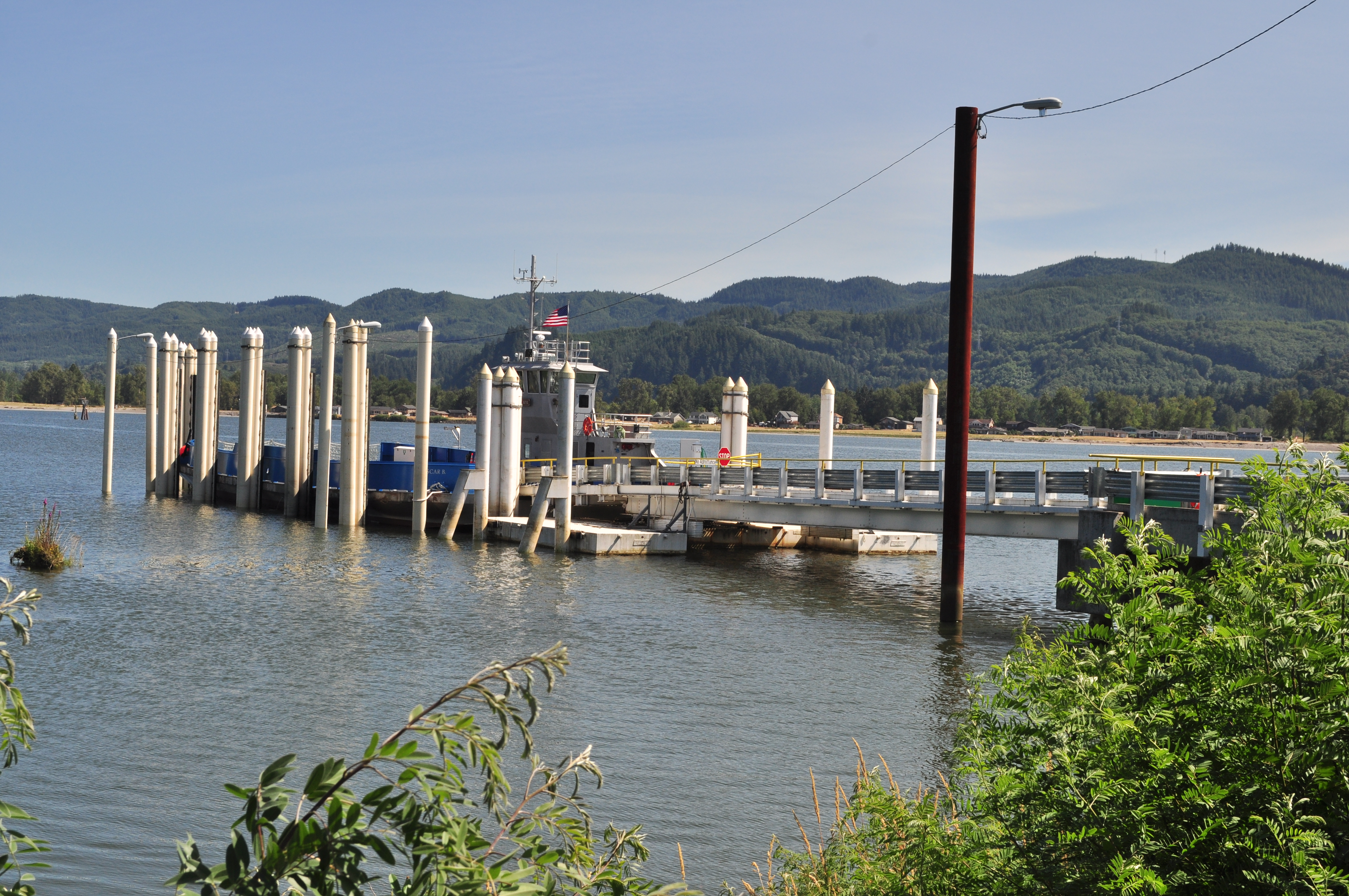
Ferry landing at Puget Island, WA

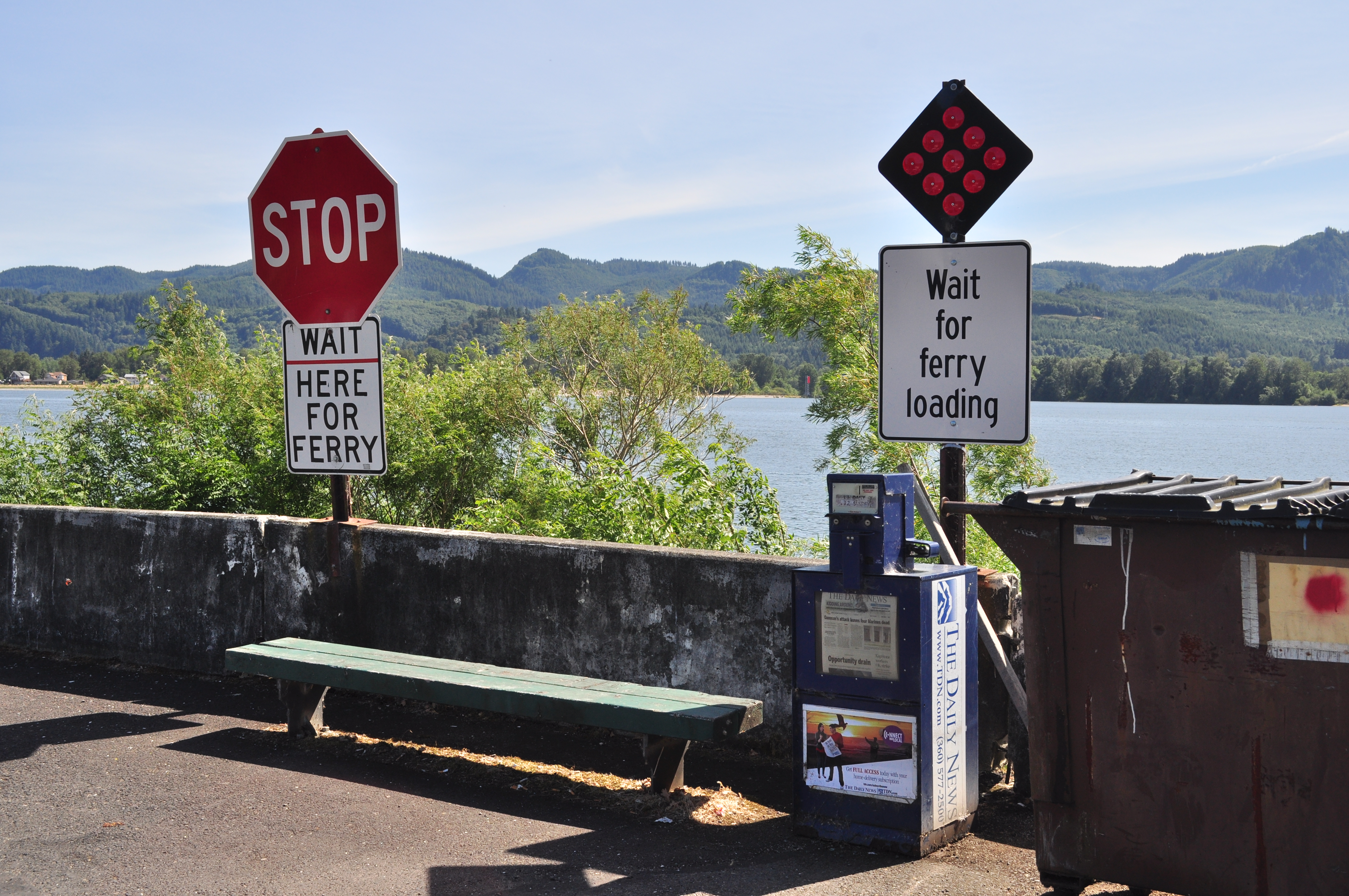
The ferry landing at Puget Island, WA

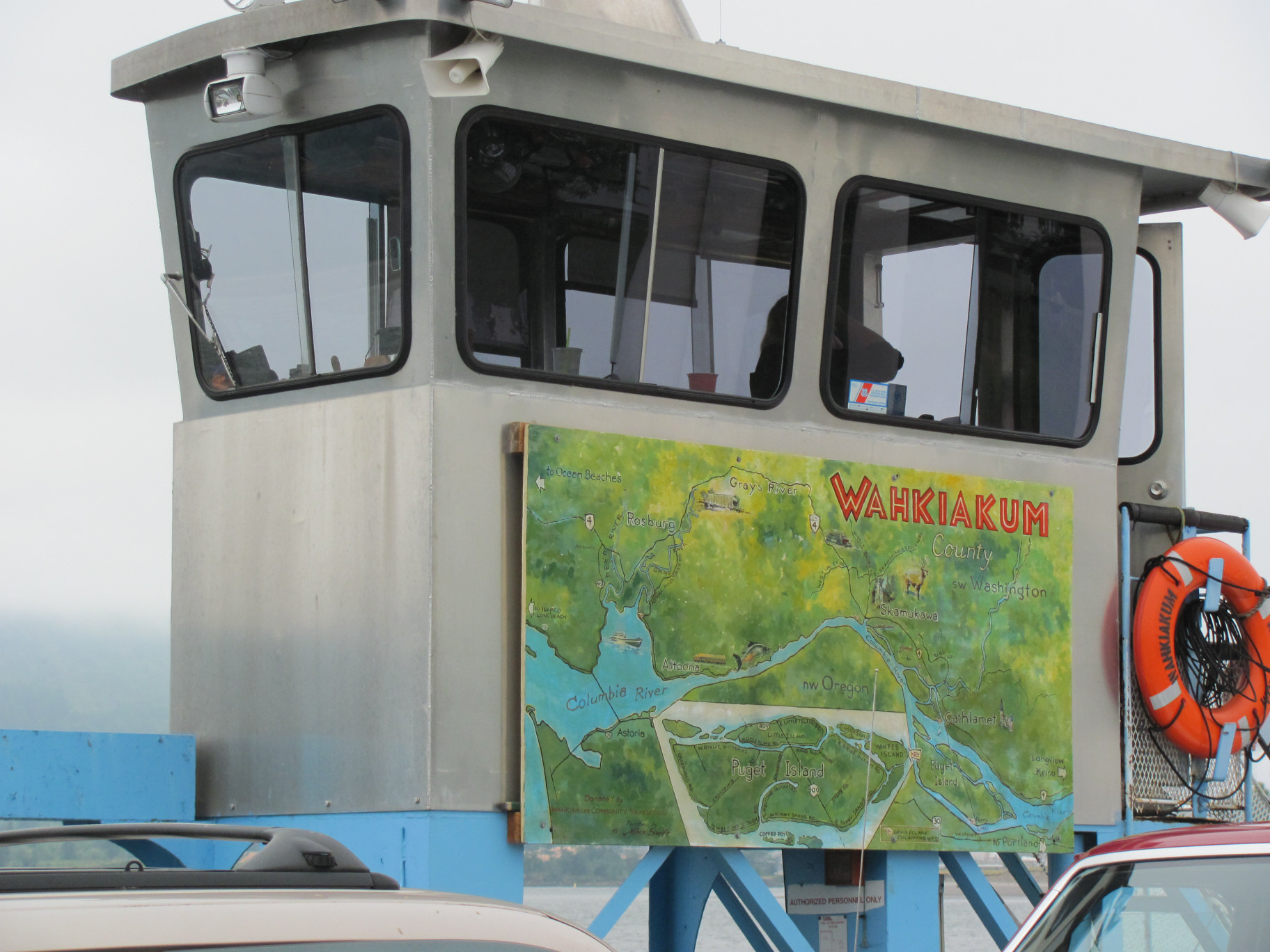
The conning tower of the ferry Wahkiakum

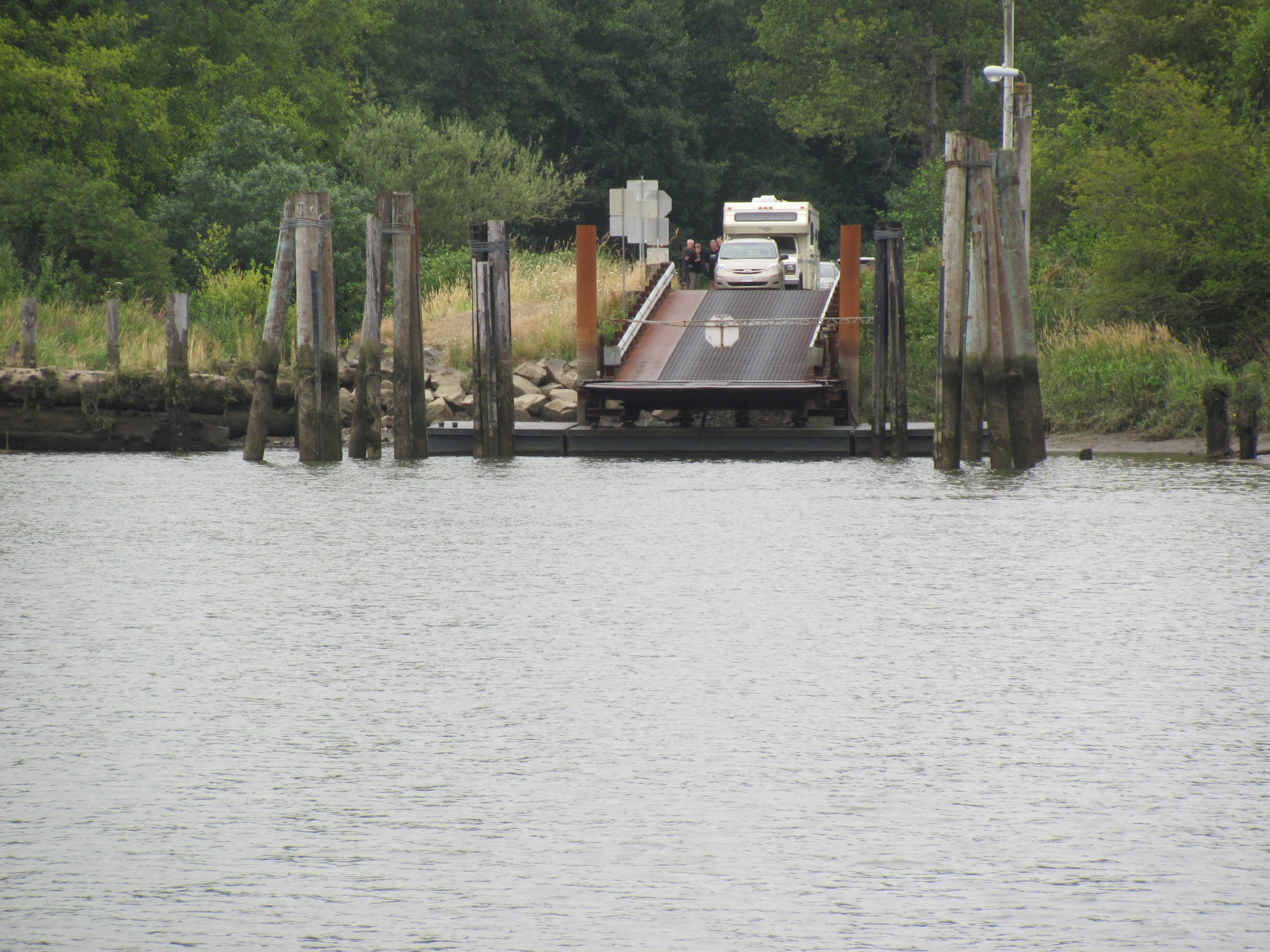
The ferry landing in Westport, OR
