= Daniel G. Marsh =

American politician

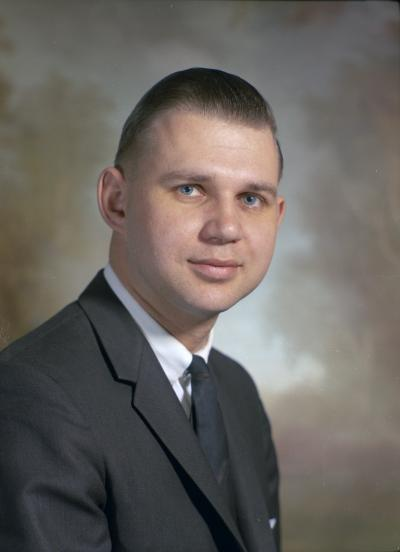
- Marsh in 1967

Member of the Washington Senate from the 49th district
- In office January 8, 1973 – January 12, 1981
- Preceded by: Frank W. Foley
- Succeeded by: Albert Bauer

Member of the Washington House of Representatives from the 49th district
- In office January 11, 1965 – January 8, 1973
- Preceded by: Ella Wintler
- Succeeded by: Albert Bauer

Personal details
- Born: 1937 (age 88–89) Salem, Oregon, U.S.
- Party: Democratic

Daniel G. Marsh (born 1937) is an American former politician in the state of Washington. He served in the Washington House of Representatives and Washington State Senate as a Democrat.
