= Julia Butler Hansen =

American politician (1907–1988)

Julia Hansen
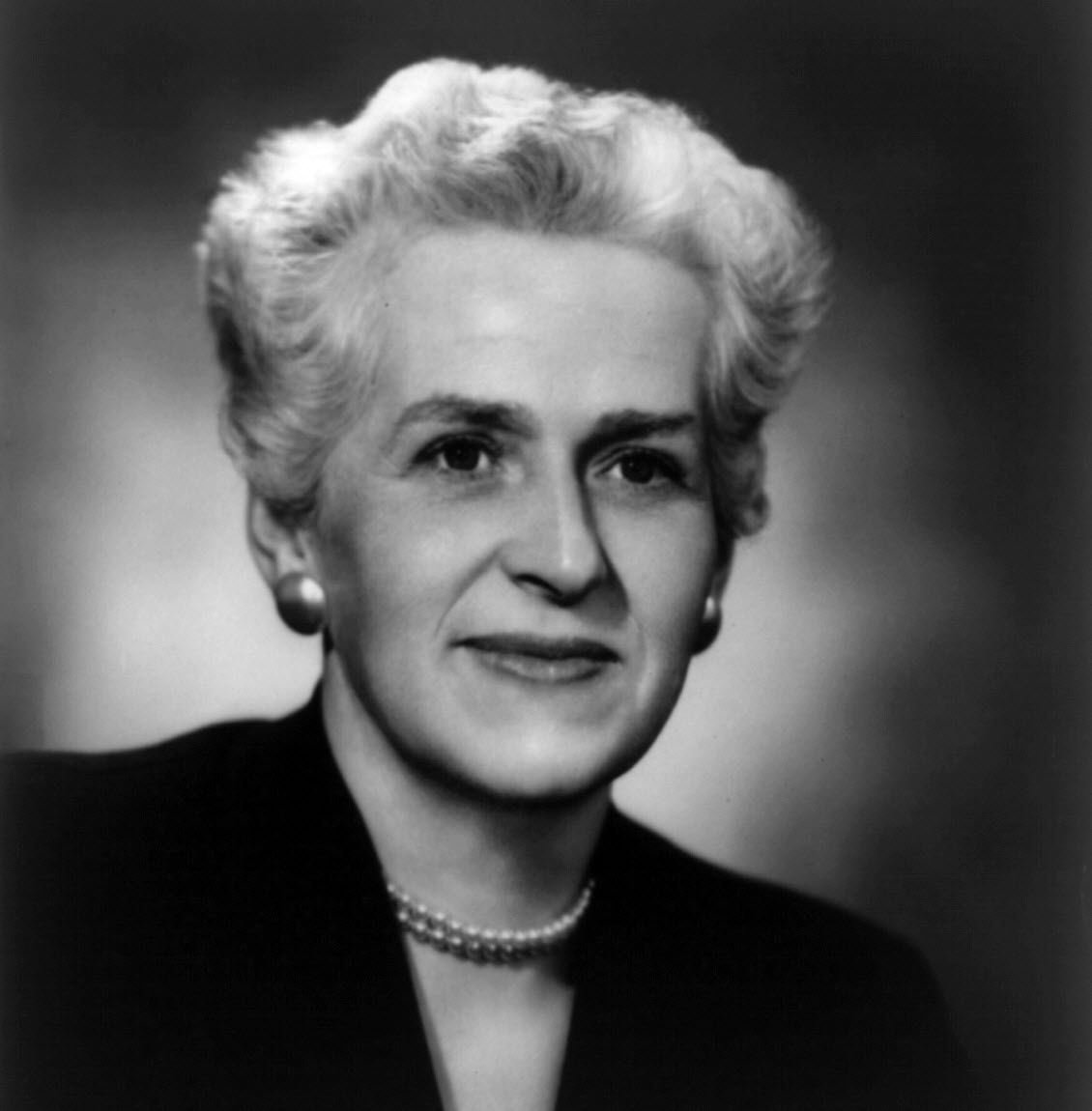

Member of the U.S. House of Representatives from Washington's 3rd district
- In office November 8, 1960 – December 31, 1974
- Preceded by: Russell V. Mack
- Succeeded by: Don Bonker

Speaker pro tempore of the Washington House of Representatives
- In office January 10, 1955 – January 9, 1961
- Preceded by: Elmer E. Johnston
- Succeeded by: Jeanette Testu

Member of the Washington House of Representatives from the 18th district
- In office January 9, 1939 – November 8, 1960
- Preceded by: Joseph Gardner
- Succeeded by: Arlie DeJarnatt

Personal details
- Born: Julia Caroline Butler; June 14, 1907 Portland, Oregon, U.S.
- Died: May 3, 1988 (aged 80) Cathlamet, Washington, U.S.
- Party: Democratic
- Spouse: Henry Hansen
- Education: Oregon State University (attended); University of Washington, Seattle (BA)

Julia Butler Hansen (June 14, 1907 – May 3, 1988) was an American politician who served as a member of the United States House of Representatives from 1960 to 1974. She represented Washington's third congressional district as a Democrat. She was the second woman and first Democratic woman elected to Congress from Washington.

== Early life and education ==
Her father, Donald C. Butler, was sheriff of Wahkiakum County and her mother, Maude Eliza (Kimball), was named Washington's "Mother of the Year" in 1960. Hansen attended public school in Washington. She attended Oregon State College from 1924 to 1926, and graduated from the University of Washington (Seattle) with a Bachelor of Arts in home economics in 1930.

== Entry to public service ==
Hansen's political career began as a member of the Cathlamet, Washington, city council, where she served from 1938 to 1946. She served in the Washington State Legislature as a member of the State House of Representatives from January 1939 until November 1960, serving as the first woman speaker pro tempore from 1955 to 1960. She served as chairman of the Western Interstate Committee on Highway Policies for 11 western states from 1951 to 1961.

== United States Congress ==
She was elected simultaneously as a Democrat to the Eighty-sixth Congress and to the Eighty-seventh Congress by special election, to fill the vacancy caused by the death of United States Representative Russell V. Mack, and was re-elected to the six succeeding Congresses (November 8, 1960 – December 31, 1974). She served on the House Appropriations Committee after serving for years on Education, Labor, Veteran's Affairs, Interior and Insular Affairs Committees. Hansen voted in favor of the Civil Rights Acts of 1964, Civil Rights Act of 1968 and the Voting Rights Act of 1965. During Hansen's time in Congress, her voting record was a predominantly liberal one.

From 1970 to 1974, Hansen chaired the House Democratic Caucus's Committee on Organization, Study and Review (called the Reform Committee) that led to a series of internal rules changes.

== Later career ==
Hansen did not run for re-election to Congress in 1974, and was appointed in 1975 to a six-year term on the Washington State Toll Bridge Authority and State Highway Commission. She served as chair of the Washington State Transportation Commission from 1979 to 1981.

== Allegations of anti-Semitism ==
Edward I. Koch, later New York City mayor, recounted overhearing a conversation on the floor of the House in 1973 during a vote to fund arms replenishment to Israel during the Yom Kippur War. Speaking with two other members of Congress, Hansen allegedly "went off on a bizarre tangent, saying, 'You know, I was once cheated by a Jew,' and launching into a diatribe about how she did not like Jews."

== Personal life ==
Hansen was the author of a book for children titled Singing Paddles, published by Binfords and Mort in 1935, which won the Julia Ellsworth Ford Foundation Award for Juvenile Literature. She married Henry A. Hansen, a logger, on July 15, 1939; they were parents of one natural son, David, and Henry's adopted son Richard. Hansen was also manager of the Wahkiakum County Abstract Company and the G. Henry Hanigan Insurance Co. in Cathlamet, and served as chairman and member of the board of trustees of Century 21, State of Washington, beginning in 1958.

== Death and legacy ==
Hansen lived in Cathlamet until her death there on May 3, 1988. She is honored by the Julia Butler Hansen Refuge for the Columbian White-Tailed Deer, a National Wildlife Refuge established in 1972 in Cathlamet; the Julia Butler Hansen Elementary School, opened in 1994 in the Olympia School District in Olympia, Washington; and the Julia Butler Hansen Bridge connecting Cathlamet to Puget Island, Washington.

== See also ==
- Women in the United States House of Representatives

Washington House of Representatives
Preceded by Elmer E. Johnston	Speaker pro tempore of the Washington House of Representatives; 1955–1961	Succeeded by Jeanette Testu
U.S. House of Representatives
Preceded by Russell V. Mack	Member of the U.S. House of Representatives from Washington's 3rd congressional district 1960–1974	Succeeded by Don Bonker
Party political offices
New office	Chair of the House Democratic Reform Committee; 1970–1974	Position abolished
