= East Cathlamet, Washington =

- CDP
- Location of East Cathlamet, Washington
- Coordinates: 46°11′56″N 123°22′02″W
- Country: United States
- State: Washington
- County: Wahkiakum

Area
  - Total: 1.713 sq mi (4.436 km^{2})
  - Land: 1.713 sq mi (4.436 km^{2})
  - Water: 0 sq mi (0.000 km^{2})
- Elevation: 1,161 ft (354 m)

Population (2020)
  - Total: 578
  - Density: 337/sq mi (130/km^{2})
- Time zone: UTC−8 (PST)
  - Summer (DST): UTC−7 (PDT)
- ZIP Code: 98612
- Area code(s): 360, 564
- FIPS code: 53-19290
- GNIS feature ID: 2408703

East Cathlamet is a census-designated place (CDP) in Wahkiakum County, Washington, on the eastern border of the town of Cathlamet. The population was 578 as of the 2020 census. The East Cathlamet community is part of the Wahkiakum School District, a K-12 school district of about 430 students. The name "Kathlamet" (Cathlamet) comes from the Kathlamet tribe, which in their language, means "rocky shore."

== Geography ==
According to the United States Census Bureau, the East Cathlamet CDP has a total area of 1.71 square miles (4.4 km^{2}), of which all of it is land and none of it is water.

== Demographics ==
Historical population
Census	Pop.	Note	%±
2000	491		—
2010	491		0.0%
2020	578		17.7%
U.S. Decennial Census; 1970 1980 1990; 2000 2010

East Cathlamet first appeared as a census designated place in the 2000 U.S. census.

=== Racial and ethnic composition ===
East Cathlamet CDP, Washington – Racial and ethnic composition Note: the US Census treats Hispanic/Latino as an ethnic category. This table excludes Latinos from the racial categories and assigns them to a separate category. Hispanics/Latinos may be of any race.
Race / Ethnicity (NH = Non-Hispanic)	Pop 2000	Pop 2010	Pop 2020	% 2000	% 2010	% 2020
White alone (NH)	469	464	496	95.52%	94.50%	85.81%
Black or African American alone (NH)	0	1	1	0.00%	0.20%	0.17%
Native American or Alaska Native alone (NH)	6	8	5	1.22%	1.63%	0.87%
Asian alone (NH)	0	1	11	0.00%	0.20%	1.90%
Native Hawaiian or Pacific Islander alone (NH)	1	0	1	0.20%	0.00%	0.17%
Other race alone (NH)	0	0	0	0.00%	0.00%	0.00%
Mixed race or Multiracial (NH)	10	8	34	2.04%	1.63%	5.88%
Hispanic or Latino (any race)	5	9	30	1.02%	1.83%	5.19%
Total	491	491	578	100.00%	100.00%	100.00%

=== 2010 ===
As of the 2010 census, there were 491 people, 227 households, and 149 families residing in the CDP. The population density was 286.6 people per square mile (110.7 people/km^{2}). There were 248 housing units at an average density of 144.8 units per square mile (55.9 units/km^{2}). The racial makeup of the CDP was 95.5% White, 0.2% African American, 1.8% Native American, 0.2% Asian, 0.0% Pacific Islander, 0.2% from other races, and 2.0% from two or more races. Hispanic or Latino of any race were 1.8% of the population.

There were 227 households, out of which 20.3% had children under the age of 18 living with them, 48.5% were married couples living together, 11.0% had a female householder with no husband present, and 34.4% were non-families. 29.1% of all households were made up of individuals, and 17.6% had someone living alone who was 65 years of age or older. The average household size was 2.16 and the average family size was 2.55.

In the CDP, the age distribution of the population shows 17.1% under the age of 18, 4.3% from 18 to 24, 15.7% from 25 to 44, 33.0% from 45 to 64, and 29.9% who were 65 years of age or older. The median age was 53.6 years. For every 100 females, there were 94.1 males. For every 100 females age 18 and over, there were 85.8 males.

=== 2000 ===
As of the 2000 census, there were 491 people, 214 households, and 144 families residing in the CDP. The population density was 282.2 people per square mile (109.0 people/km^{2}). There were 234 housing units at an average density of 134.5 units per square mile (51.9 units/km^{2}). The racial makeup of the CDP was 95.7% White, 0.0% African American, 1.2% Native American, 0.0% Asian, 0.2% Pacific Islander, 0.8% from other races, and 2.0% from two or more races. Hispanic or Latino of any race were 1.0% of the population.

There were 214 households, out of which 22.9% had children under the age of 18 living with them, 57.5% were married couples living together, 6.1% had a female householder with no husband present, and 32.7% were non-families. 26.2% of all households were made up of individuals, and 13.6% had someone living alone who was 65 years of age or older. The average household size was 2.29 and the average family size was 2.73.

In the CDP, the age distribution of the population shows 23.0% under the age of 18, 3.9% from 18 to 24, 19.8% from 25 to 44, 24.8% from 45 to 64, and 28.5% who were 65 years of age or older. The median age was 48 years. For every 100 females, there were 94.1 males. For every 100 females age 18 and over, there were 94.8 males.

The median income for a household in the CDP was $40,000, and the median income for a family was $51,875. Males had a median income of $50,658 versus $19,519 for females. The per capita income for the CDP was $19,372. None of the population or families were below the poverty line.
