= Avery Garrett =

American politician

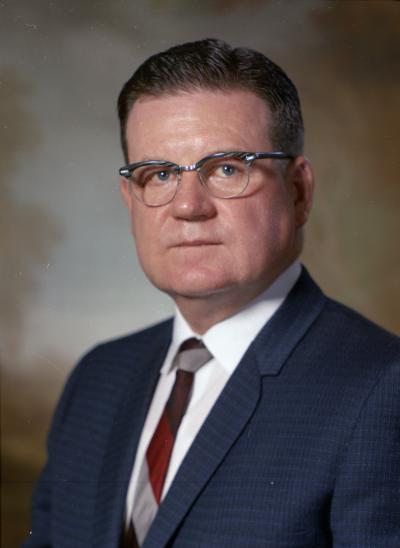
- Garrett in 1967

Speaker pro tempore of the Washington House of Representatives
- In office January 11, 1965 – January 9, 1967
- Preceded by: Ella Wintler
- Succeeded by: Tom Copeland

Member of the Washington House of Representatives
- In office 1959–1969; 1977–1985

Member of the Washington State Senate for the 11th district
- In office 1985–1988
- Succeeded by: Leo K. Thorsness

Personal details
- Born: August 3, 1916 Georgia, United States
- Died: April 15, 1988 (aged 71) Renton, Washington, United States
- Party: Democratic
- Spouse: Edna Mae Garrett
- Children: Glenn A Garrett, Shirley Patterson, Sylvia Garrett, Susan Garrett

Avery Garrett (August 3, 1916 – April 15, 1988) was an American politician in the state of Washington. He served as Mayor of Renton from 1969 to 1976. He also served in the Washington House of Representatives from 1959 to 1969 for district 47 and from 1977 to 1985 for district 11, and in the Senate from 1985 to 1988.
