= Puget Island, Washington =

Puget Island
- CDP
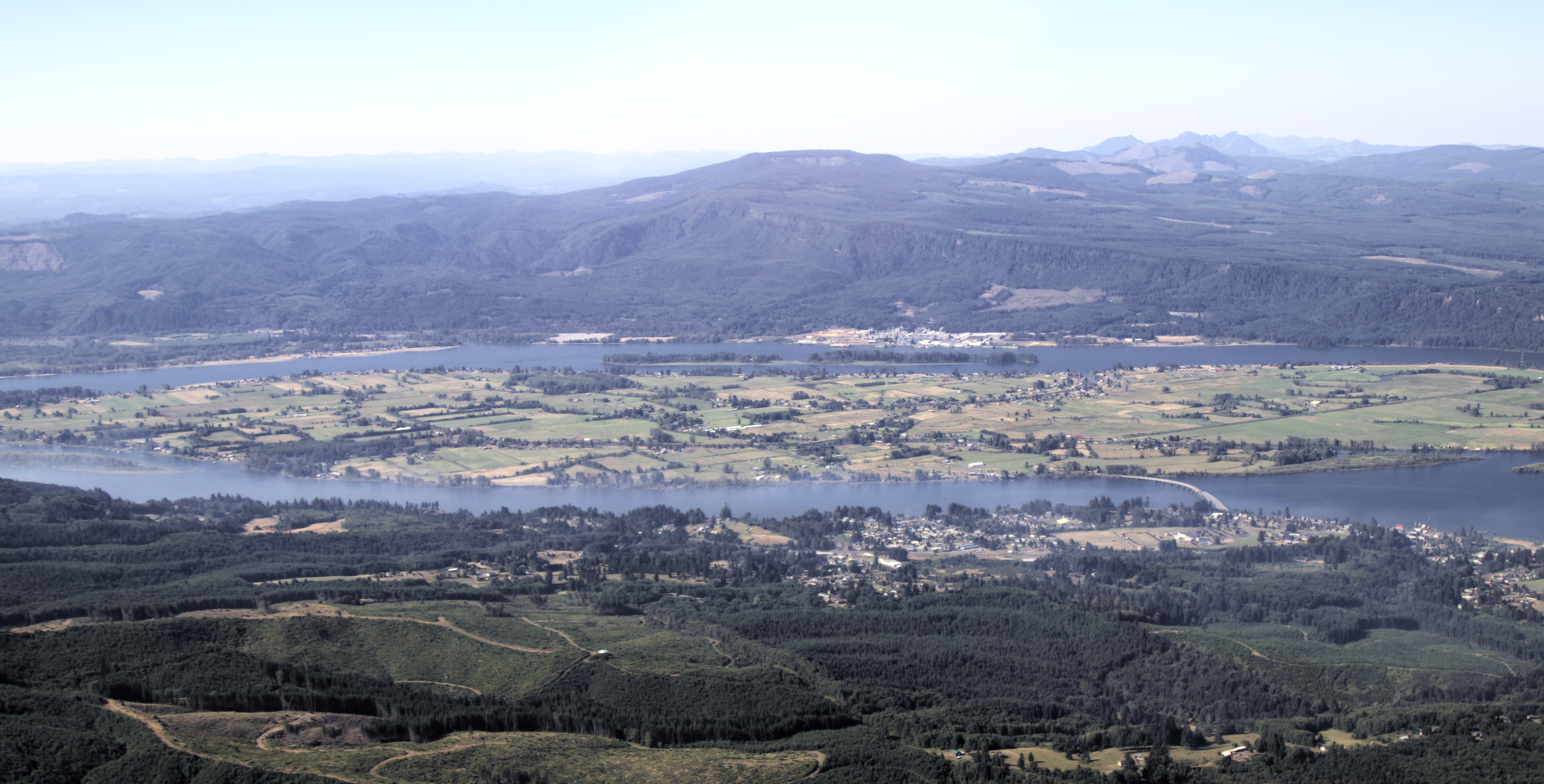
- Puget Island from the north. It is linked to Cathlamet, Washington by the Julia Butler Hansen Bridge.

- Location within the state of Washington
- Coordinates: 46°10′14″N 123°22′35″W
- Country: United States
- State: Washington
- County: Wahkiakum

Area
  - Total: 7.477 sq mi (19.365 km^{2})
- Elevation: 7 ft (2.1 m)

Population (2020)
  - Total: 922
  - Density: 123/sq mi (47.6/km^{2})
- Time zone: UTC-8 (Pacific (PST))
  - Summer (DST): UTC-7 (PDT)
- ZIP Code: 98612
- Area code(s): 360, 564
- GNIS feature ID: 2585023

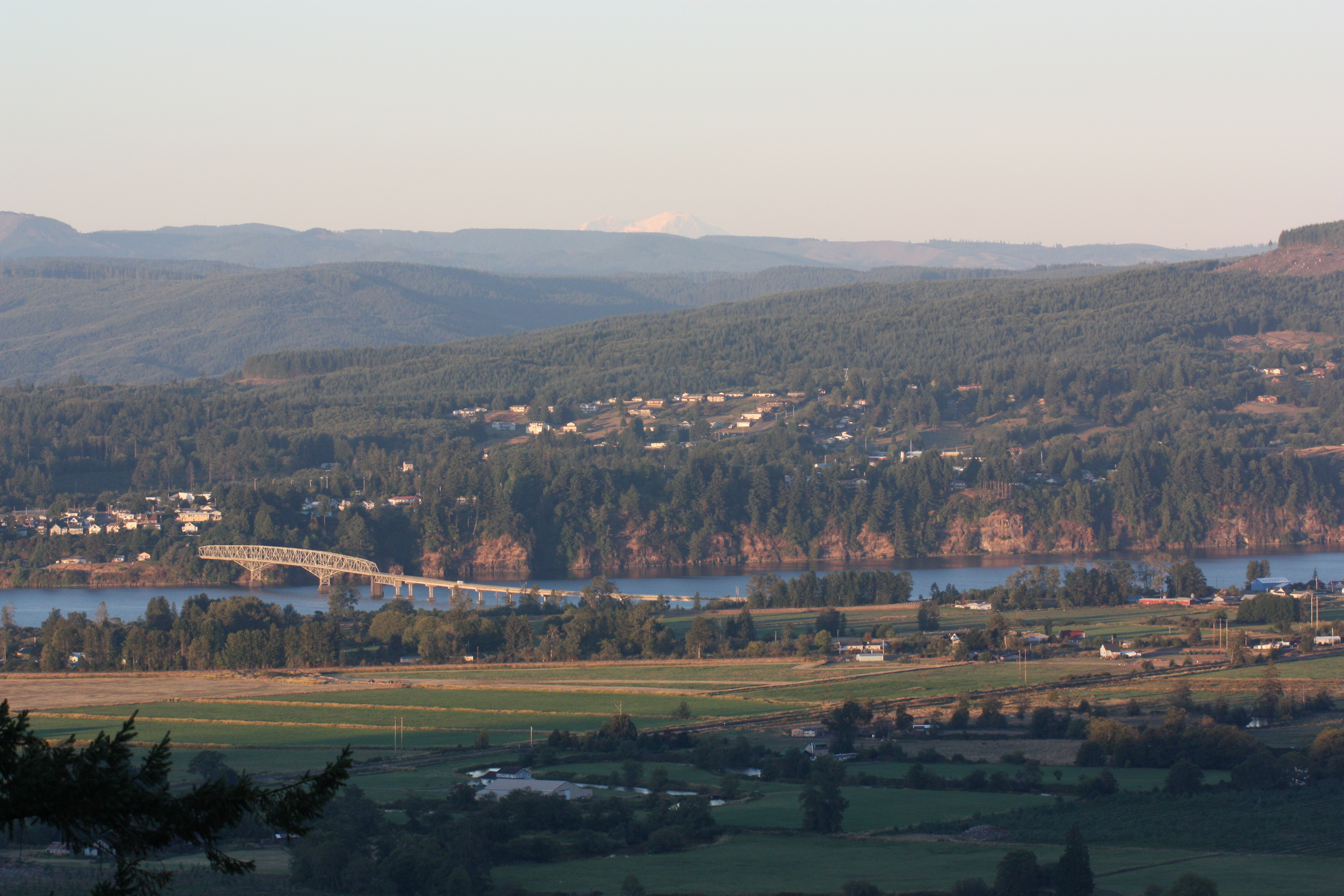
Puget Island viewed from the south.

Puget Island is a 7.5 sq mi (4,785 acre; 19.365 km^{2}) island and Census-designated place (CDP) in the Columbia River in Wahkiakum County, Washington, United States. The island was named for Peter Puget, a lieutenant in the Vancouver Expedition of exploration, which first mapped the island in 1792.

The Julia Butler Hansen Bridge (built in 1938) carries State Route 409 across the Cathlamet Channel to connect the island to the town of Cathlamet, Washington. Route 409 crosses the island to its southern shore, where it connects with the county-operated Wahkiakum County Ferry, Oscar B, providing service to Westport, Oregon. The 2020 census reported a population of 922 persons.

Puget Island's Robert W. Little Preserve is home to a population of endangered Columbian white-tailed deer.

== History ==
Puget Island was settled in 1884 by the Ostervold family. In addition to running dairy farms, farmers on the island grew mint from 1917 to the late 1940s. The next major crop grown on Puget Island was cucumbers, primarily for pickling, until the crops were damaged by mosaic disease. In the 1990s, sheep, dairying, and cottonwood were the main agricultural pursuits.

== Demographics ==
Historical population
Census	Pop.	Note	%±
2010	831		—
2020	922		11.0%
U.S. Decennial Census; 2000 2010 2020

Puget Island first appeared as a census designated place in the 2010 U.S. census.

=== Racial and ethnic composition ===
Puget Island CDP, Washington – Racial and ethnic composition Note: the US Census treats Hispanic/Latino as an ethnic category. This table excludes Latinos from the racial categories and assigns them to a separate category. Hispanics/Latinos may be of any race.
Race / Ethnicity (NH = Non-Hispanic)	Pop 2010	Pop 2020	% 2010	% 2020
White alone (NH)	765	814	92.06%	88.29%
Black or African American alone (NH)	1	1	0.12%	0.11%
Native American or Alaska Native alone (NH)	8	11	0.96%	1.19%
Asian alone (NH)	5	2	0.60%	0.22%
Native Hawaiian or Pacific Islander alone (NH)	0	0	0.00%	0.00%
Other race alone (NH)	0	2	0.00%	0.22%
Mixed race or Multiracial (NH)	25	58	3.01%	6.29%
Hispanic or Latino (any race)	27	34	3.25%	3.69%
Total	831	922	100.00%	100.00%

As of the 2020 census, there were 922 people, 488 housing units, and 455 families. There were 833 White people, 1 African American, 13 Native Americans, 2 Asians, 7 people from some other race, and 66 people from two or more races. There were 34 people from Hispanic or Latino origin.

The ancestry in Puget Island was 21.5% English, 8.7% German, 7.1% Irish, 4.9% Norwegian,1.8% Scottish, 1.8% French, and 0.9% Italian.

The median age was 60 years old. A total of 37.5% of the population were older than 65, with 22.5% being from 65 to 74 years, 12.7% being from 75 to 84 years, and 2.2% being 85 or older.

The median household income was $56,929, with families having $58,401, and non-families having $56,087. A total of 10.6% of the population were in poverty, with 9.3% of people between the ages of 18 and 64 being in poverty, and 17.4% of people over 65 being in poverty.
