= Supreme Emblem Club of the United States of America =

American fraternal auxiliary

- Founded: April 27, 1926; 100 years ago Rhode Island, US
- Type: Fraternal order
- Affiliation: Benevolent and Protective Order of Elks
- Status: Active
- Scope: National
- Motto: "Truth, Justice, and Charity"
- Colors: Purple and Gold
- Philanthropy: Americanism
- Nickname: Emblem Club
- Headquarters: 17 Gilbert Street; West Newton, Massachusetts 02465-2210; United States
- Website: www.emblemclub.org

The Supreme Emblem Club of the United States of America is the unofficial auxiliary of the Benevolent and Protective Order of Elks.

== History ==
The order was organized during World War I by a group of female relatives of the Elks who met to wrap bandages to send to wounded soldiers overseas. The group eventually decided to turn their circle into a regular club and was chartered in the State of Rhode Island on April 27, 1926. Its founders were Mary L. Clark, Mary T. Duffy, Alice Farrell, Charlotte O’Connor, Esther A. Sweeney and Charlotte O’Connor.

During the first year, nine affiliates, known as Emblem Clubs, were formed in Rhode Island, Massachusetts, New Hampshire, and Connecticut.

The original articles of incorporation stated that the Emblem Clubs' goals were to "unite under one head, all existing and future Clubs commonly known as Elks' Ladies clubs, Committees or groups...promote sociability among members of Elks', share community welfare work...assist with social affairs...[and] promote better understanding and further the ideals and purposes for which each organization was established." Religious and political subjects were banned from discussion at Club meetings.

== Symbols ==
The name Emblem was selected to represent the flag of the United States. Its motto is "Truth, Justice, and Charity". The club's insignia is an Elk's head surrounded by a wreath.

Its colors are purple and gold. Purple represents royalty and the high standards of the Elks. Gold stands for the righ blessings that members share with those who are less fortunate.

The ritual of the Emblem Club was not considered secret, but neither was it really public. It was written by a member of the Elks, and included a nondenominational prayer and a salute to the American flag.

== Organization ==
Local units are called Emblem Clubs and state groups, like in the BPOE, are called "State Associations". In 1979 there were 500 local Clubs and 11 State Associations. The national structure is called the "Supreme Emblem Club". In 1979 the group did not appear to have a headquarters per se, but was run by a Supreme Executive Secretary in Rutherford, New Jersey. Today there are 16 State Associations (though three have jurisdiction over more than one state the California Hawaii Nevada State Association, the Ohio/West Virginia State Association and the Wisconsin-Illinois-Indiana-Michigan State Association).

== Membership ==
Membership is open to everyone, men and women, age 16 years and older. In earlier years, membership was limited to the wives, mothers, sisters, daughters, stepdaughters and widows of members of the Benevolent and Protective Order of Elks. In 1979 there were 40,000 members, the same as a decade previously. There were 41,000 members in 1989. Currently, in 2018, the Supreme Emblem Club of the United States of America is facing a rapidly declining membership. The biggest reason for declining numbers of members is death or serious illness. The overall decline in Americans joining service organizations, as well as lack of available time due to working families has contributed to the decline in new membership applications. The majority of members are, now, senior citizens. A lack of new incoming members is an ongoing concern.

In 2018, there are a lot of individual Emblem Clubs that make up the Supreme Emblem Club. The clubs are scattered all over the United States, east coast to west coast. The individual clubs range in size from very small to large. For example, Hartford Emblem Club # 150 from Hartford, VT has just twenty members, whereas Billerica, Massachusetts has over 200 members

== Philanthropy and activities ==
The Emblem Club has adopted a formal program to support Americanism, and sets aside one week in June each year as "Americanism week". Prompted by the 1964 Alaska earthquake, the Emblem Club created a national disaster fund. The Clubs also sponsor scholarships and supports the Elks National Home in Bedford, Virginia. Emblem clubs nationwide on the club level, as well as The national Organization, has given out over $2,000,000 in scholarships to students in the United States. Their unending efforts and work to support our American Veterans are phenomenal, as is their work with adults & children with Literacy projects and Drug Awareness projects.
