= W. E. Carty =

American politician

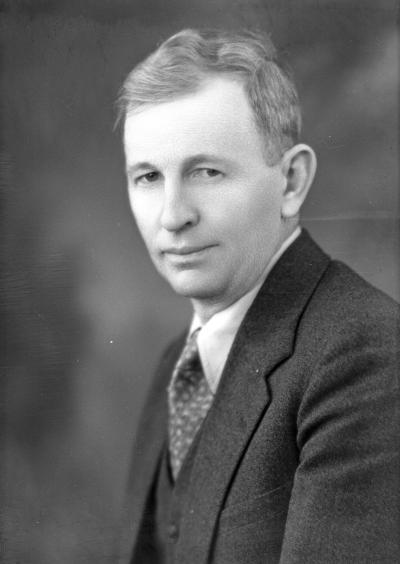
- Carty in 1933

Member of the Washington House of Representatives for the 17th district
- In office 1933––1937; 1939–1943; 1945–1953; 1955–1959

Member of the Washington House of Representatives for the 49th district
- In office 1959–1961

Personal details
- Born: April 4, 1894 Ridgefield, Washington, United States
- Died: 1962 (aged 67–68) Washington, United States
- Party: Democratic

William Edward Carty (April 4, 1894 – 1962) was an American politician in the state of Washington. He served 11 of the 14 terms of the Washington House of Representatives from 1933 to 1961.
