= Westport, Oregon =

Unincorporated community in the state of Oregon, United States

- Census-designated place
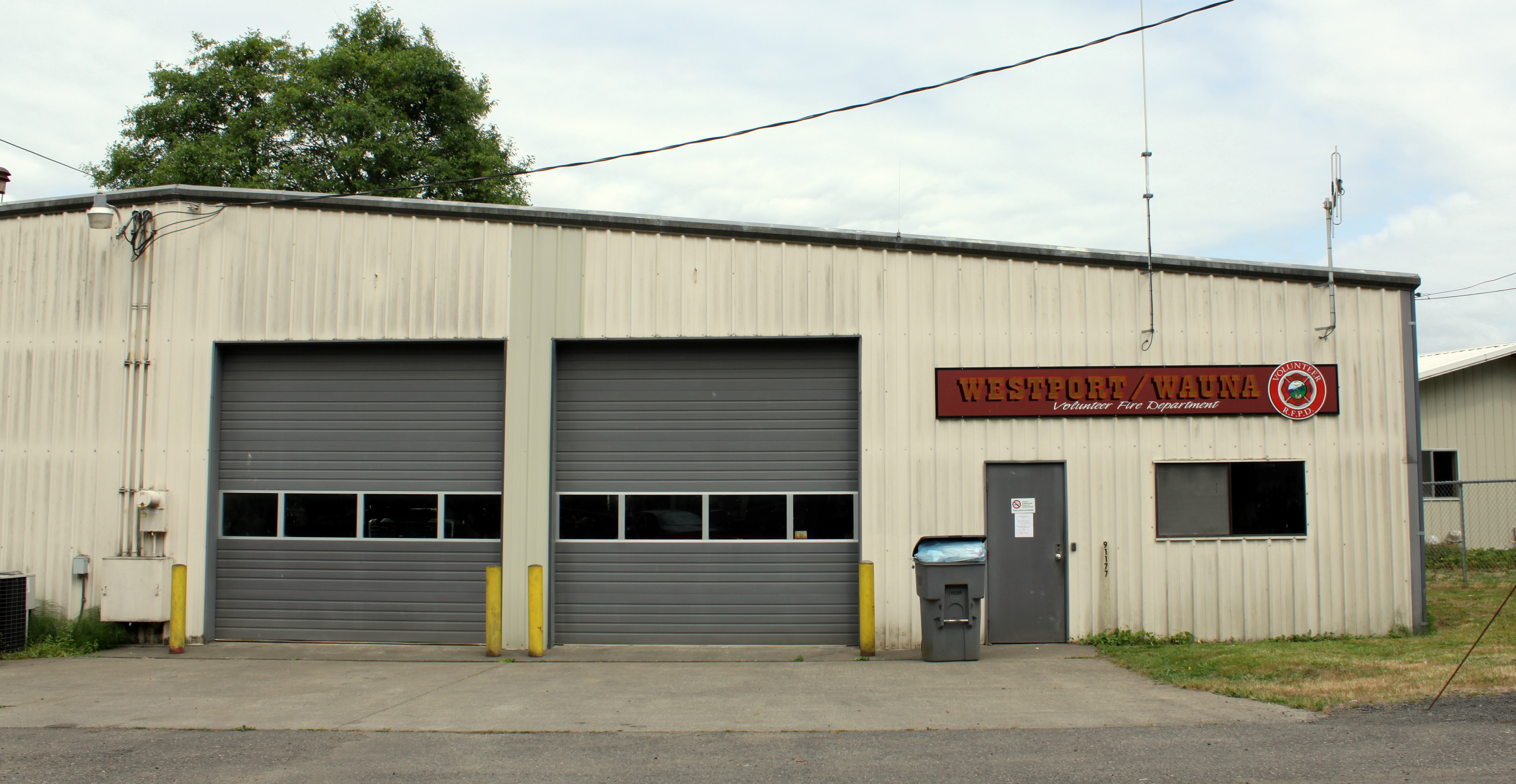
- Volunteer Fire Department in Westport

- Location within the state of Oregon Westport (the United States)
- Coordinates: 46°07′45″N 123°22′31″W
- Country: United States
- State: Oregon
- County: Clatsop

Area
  - Total: 0.66 sq mi (1.72 km^{2})
  - Land: 0.66 sq mi (1.72 km^{2})
  - Water: 0 sq mi (0.00 km^{2})
- Elevation: 16 ft (4.9 m)

Population (2020)
  - Total: 319
  - Density: 481/sq mi (185.9/km^{2})
- Time zone: UTC-8 (Pacific (PST))
  - Summer (DST): UTC-7 (PDT)
- ZIP code: 97016
- Area codes: 503 and 971
- FIPS code: 41-80400
- GNIS feature ID: 2611784

Westport is an unincorporated community and census-designated place on the Columbia River in Clatsop County, Oregon, United States. As of the 2020 census, Westport had a population of 319.

Westport is connected to Cathlamet, Washington, across the river via the Wahkiakum County ferry to Puget Island. U.S. Route 30 passes through the community, connecting it to Astoria to the west and Clatskanie to the east.

Westport is named after "Captain" John West, a millwright and lumberman who settled in the area in the early 1850s. West was a native of Scotland, emigrated to Canada as a young man where he worked in a sawmill on the St. Lawrence River and then came to Oregon via California during the gold rush of 1849. West ran a sawmill and a salmon cannery in the community. The Westport post office was established in 1863 with West as its first postmaster.

== Demographics ==
Historical population
Census	Pop.	Note	%±
2020	319		—
U.S. Decennial Census

== Education ==
It is in the Clatskanie School District 6J.

Clatsop County is in the boundary of Clatsop Community College.

The Westport School won the OSAA "Class B" Boy's State High School Basketball Championship in 1941, and the "Class B 6-Man" State High School Football Championships in 1947 and 1949. The school was closed in 1952 and students in Westport now attend Clatskanie Middle/High School about 10 miles (16 km) to the east in Clatskanie.
