= National Register of Historic Places listings in Garfield County, Washington =

Location of Garfield County in Washington

This list presents the full set of buildings, structures, objects, sites, or districts designated on the National Register of Historic Places in Garfield County, Washington, and offers brief descriptive information about each of them. The National Register recognizes places of national, state, or local historic significance across the United States. Out of over 90,000 National Register sites nationwide, Washington is home to approximately 1,500, and 3 of those are found in Garfield County.

This National Park Service list is complete through NPS recent listings posted April 24, 2026.

== Current listings ==
	Name on the Register	Image	Date listed	Location	City or town	Description
1	Downtown Pomeroy Historic District	Downtown Pomeroy Historic District	August 21, 2003 (#03000811)	Roughly bounded by Main St., Tenth and Ninth Sts., Columbia St., and Sixth St. 46°28′28″N 117°35′56″W	Pomeroy	
2	Garfield County Courthouse	Garfield County Courthouse	July 24, 1974 (#74001951)	8th and Main Sts. 46°28′30″N 117°36′04″W	Pomeroy	
3	Lewis and Clark Trail-Travois Road	Lewis and Clark Trail-Travois Road	January 11, 1974 (#74001952)	5 mi (8.0 km). E of Pomeroy, U.S. 12; 46°27′52″N 117°28′23″W	Pomeroy	

== See also ==
- National Register of Historic Places listings in Washington state
- Listings in neighboring counties: Asotin, Columbia, Wallowa, Whitman
- Historic preservation
- History of Washington (state)
- Index of Washington (state)-related articles
