= Downtown Pomeroy Historic District =

Historic district in Pomeroy, Washington, United States

- U.S. National Register of Historic Places
- U.S. Historic district
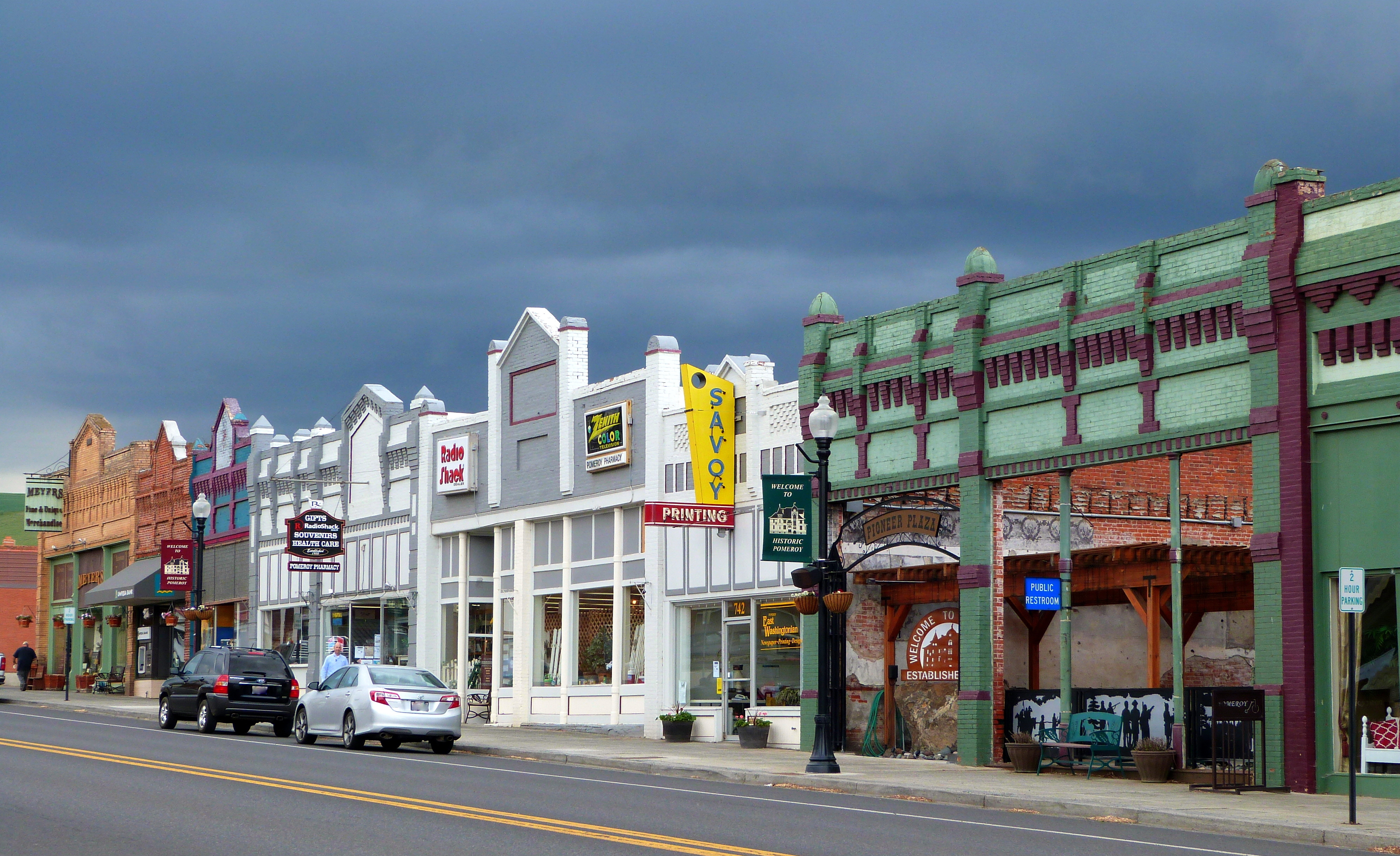
- The Downtown Pomeroy Historic District in 2015

- Location within Washington (state) Location within the United States
- Location: Roughly bounded by Main St., Tenth and Ninth Sts., Columbia St., and Sixth St., Pomeroy, Washington
- Coordinates: 46.47449°N 117.6°W
- Area: 13.7 acres (5.5 ha)
- Architect: Burggraf, Charles; et al.
- Architectural style: Italianate, Gothic Revival
- NRHP reference No.: 03000811
- Added to NRHP: August 21, 2003

The Downtown Pomeroy Historic District is a 13.7-acre (5.5 ha) historic district in Pomeroy, Washington, United States, that is listed on the National Register of Historic Places (NRHP).

== Description ==
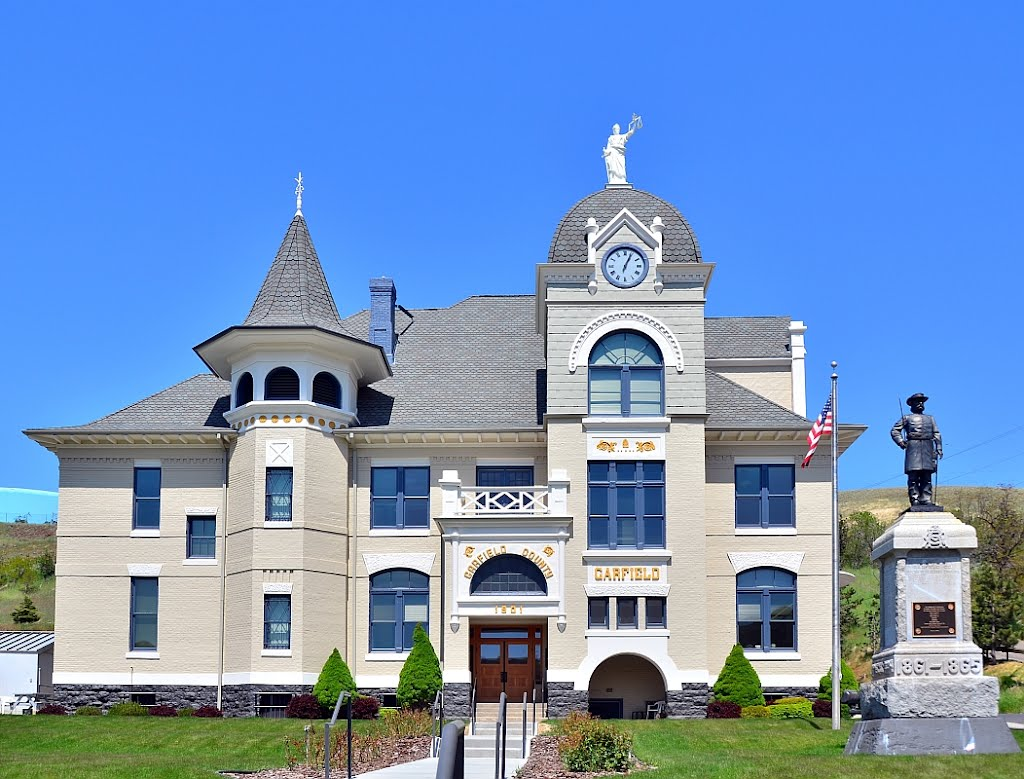
The Garfield County Courthouse after renovation, July 2011

The district is roughly bounded by Main, Tenth, Ninth, Columbia, and Sixth streets.

The Garfield County Courthouse, which was designed by Charles Burggraf and is separately NRHP-listed, is one of its 42 contributing buildings. It includes Italianate and Gothic Revival architecture.

It was deemed significant "as an intact concentration of building[s] reflecting the early development of Pomeroy as the leading business, governmental, trading, and shipping center of Garfield County." Pomeroy grew in the 1870s when dryland wheat farming took off and further in 1886 when a railroad arrived and the town became the Garfield County seat. It is notable for its "excellent collection of primarily commercial buildings" dating from the 1880s to the 1950s.

The district was listed on the NFHP August 21, 2003.

== See also ==
- National Register of Historic Places listings in Garfield County, Washington
