= Mayview (disambiguation) =

Mayview is a city in the U.S. state of Missouri.

Mayview may also refer to:

- Mayview, Illinois
- Mayview, Washington

== See also ==
- Mayview State Hospital
