= Mentor, Washington =

Unincorporated community in Washington, United States

- Unincorporated community
- Location within Washington (state) Location within the United States
- Coordinates: 46°27′33″N 117°28′22″W
- Country: United States
- State: Washington
- County: Garfield
- Elevation: 2,307 ft (703 m)
- Time zone: UTC-8 (Pacific (PST))
  - Summer (DST): UTC-7 (PDT)
- ZIP code: 99347
- Area code: 509
- GNIS feature ID: 1514681

Mentor is an unincorporated community in Garfield County, in the U.S. state of Washington.

The community was named after Mentor, Ohio.

U.S. Route 12 passes through the community, connecting it with Pomeroy, the county seat, to the west. The road follows the valley of Pataha Creek in this area.
