= Charles Burggraf =

American architect (1866–1942)

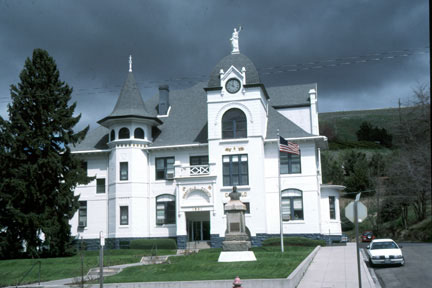
Garfield County Courthouse (Pomeroy, Washington)

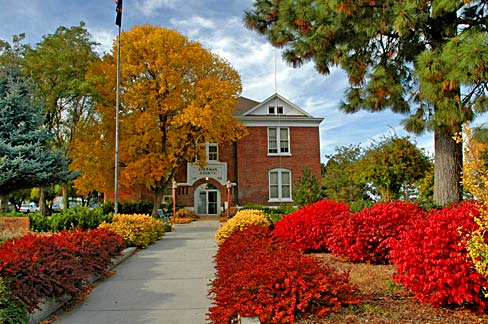
Sherman County Courthouse (Moro, Oregon)

Charles Henry Burggraf (1866–1942) was an American architect primarily working in Salem, Oregon, and Albany, Oregon, who also worked in Hastings, Nebraska, and in Grand Junction, Colorado. A number of his works are listed on the U.S. National Register of Historic Places (NRHP).

Burggraf was a prolific architect of public buildings such as courthouses, hospitals, university buildings, schools and churches. Among his works are courthouses for nine of Oregon's 36 counties (in Coos, Douglas, Gilliam, Lake, Lincoln, Linn, Sherman, Wheeler, and Tillamook counties, of which only the Tillamook, Wheeler, and Sherman buildings survived in 1998). Of hospital buildings, during 1893 to 1909 he designed three buildings at the Fairview Training Center, three at the Oregon State Hospital, and three at the Hospital Cottage Home. At the Oregon Agricultural College (later Oregon State University), he designed Waldo Hall (a women's dormitory) and the Agricultural Hall. At the Eastern Oregon Experiment Station in Union, he designed two buildings. He designed numerous public schools in Oregon, including in Albany, Ashland, Bandon, Carlton, Coquille, Corvallis, Cottage Grove, Dayton, Drain, Eugene, Fossil, Grants Pass, Jacksonville, Jefferson, Junction City, Klamath Falls, Lakeview, Medford, North Bend, North Yamhill, Roseburg, Salem, Springfield, and Union. He also designed churches, commercial buildings, at least one hotel and one bank and one library, and other buildings.

== Works ==
Burggraf's works include:

- Waldo Hall, Oregon State University (OSU) campus, Corvallis, Oregon
- Alfred Dawson House, 731 SW Broadalbin St, Albany, NRHP-listed
- Flinn Block, 222 SW 1st Ave, Albany, NRHP-listed
- Burggraf–Burt–Webster House, 901 13th St SE, Salem, NRHP-listed
- Sherman County Courthouse, 500 Court St, Moro, Oregon, NRHP-listed
- Garfield County Courthouse, 8th and Main streets, Pomeroy, Washington, NRHP-listed
