= Garfield County Courthouse =

Garfield County Courthouse may refer to:

- Garfield County Courthouse (Oklahoma), Enid, Oklahoma
- Garfield County Courthouse (Washington), Pomeroy, Washington
