= 1964 United States presidential election in Washington (state) =

- November 3, 1964

| Nominee | Lyndon B. Johnson | Barry Goldwater |
| Party | Democratic | Republican |
| Home state | Texas | Arizona |
| Running mate | Hubert Humphrey | William E. Miller |
| Electoral vote | 9 | 0 |
| Popular vote | 779,881 | 470,366 |
| Percentage | 61.97% | 37.37% |
County results
Johnson
50–60%
60–70%
70–80%
Goldwater
40–50%
50–60%
President before election
Lyndon B. Johnson
Democratic
Elected President
Lyndon B. Johnson
Democratic

The 1964 United States presidential election in Washington took place on November 3, 1964, as part of the 1964 United States presidential election. State voters chose nine representatives, or electors, to the Electoral College, who voted for president and vice president.

Washington was won by incumbent President Lyndon B. Johnson (D–Texas), with 61.97% of the popular vote, against Senator Barry Goldwater (R–Arizona), with 37.37% of the popular vote. As of the 2024 presidential election, this is the last election in which Yakima County, Benton County, Grant County, Franklin County, Lewis County, Chelan County, Walla Walla County, Stevens County, Douglas County, Columbia County, and Garfield County voted for a Democratic presidential candidate. This also remains the last time that a presidential nominee has carried the state with more than 60% of the vote.

== Results ==
1964 United States presidential election in Washington
| Party | Candidate | Votes | % |
|---|---|---|---|
| Democratic | Lyndon B. Johnson (incumbent) | 779,881 | 61.97% |
| Republican | Barry Goldwater | 470,366 | 37.37% |
| Socialist Labor | Eric Hass | 7,772 | 0.62% |
| Socialist Workers | Clifton DeBerry | 537 | 0.04% |
| Total votes | | 1,258,556 | 100% |

=== Results by county ===
| County | Lyndon B. Johnson Democratic | | Barry Goldwater Republican | | Eric Hass Socialist Labor | | Clifton DeBerry Freedom Socialist | | Margin | | Total votes cast |
| County | # | % | # | % | # | % | # | % | # | % | Total votes cast |
|---|---|---|---|---|---|---|---|---|---|---|---|
| Adams | 2,027 | 47.44% | 2,241 | 52.45% | 2 | 0.05% | 3 | 0.07% | −214 | −5.01% | 4,273 |
| Asotin | 3,657 | 67.27% | 1,777 | 32.69% | 2 | 0.04% | 0 | 0.00% | 1,880 | 34.58% | 5,436 |
| Benton | 16,650 | 58.68% | 11,708 | 41.27% | 8 | 0.03% | 6 | 0.02% | 4,942 | 17.41% | 28,372 |
| Chelan | 10,295 | 57.77% | 7,406 | 41.56% | 111 | 0.62% | 10 | 0.06% | 2,889 | 16.21% | 17,822 |
| Clallam | 9,265 | 68.86% | 4,175 | 31.03% | 14 | 0.10% | 1 | 0.01% | 5,090 | 37.83% | 13,455 |
| Clark | 29,341 | 70.21% | 12,300 | 29.43% | 140 | 0.34% | 9 | 0.02% | 17,041 | 40.78% | 41,790 |
| Columbia | 1,138 | 52.03% | 1,048 | 47.92% | 1 | 0.05% | 0 | 0.00% | 90 | 4.11% | 2,187 |
| Cowlitz | 17,605 | 71.85% | 6,708 | 27.38% | 177 | 0.72% | 11 | 0.04% | 10,897 | 44.47% | 24,501 |
| Douglas | 3,728 | 58.47% | 2,643 | 41.45% | 2 | 0.03% | 3 | 0.05% | 1,085 | 17.02% | 6,376 |
| Ferry | 931 | 63.81% | 526 | 36.05% | 2 | 0.14% | 0 | 0.00% | 405 | 27.76% | 1,459 |
| Franklin | 6,375 | 63.38% | 3,615 | 35.94% | 66 | 0.66% | 2 | 0.02% | 2,760 | 27.44% | 10,058 |
| Garfield | 781 | 50.98% | 751 | 49.02% | 0 | 0.00% | 0 | 0.00% | 30 | 1.96% | 1,532 |
| Grant | 8,352 | 57.89% | 6,065 | 42.04% | 8 | 0.06% | 2 | 0.01% | 2,287 | 15.85% | 14,427 |
| Grays Harbor | 17,145 | 74.46% | 5,744 | 24.94% | 132 | 0.57% | 6 | 0.03% | 11,401 | 49.52% | 23,027 |
| Island | 3,946 | 56.38% | 3,044 | 43.49% | 8 | 0.11% | 1 | 0.01% | 902 | 12.89% | 6,999 |
| Jefferson | 3,012 | 67.59% | 1,432 | 32.14% | 8 | 0.18% | 4 | 0.09% | 1,580 | 35.45% | 4,456 |
| King | 268,216 | 59.52% | 177,598 | 39.41% | 4,535 | 1.01% | 291 | 0.06% | 90,618 | 20.11% | 450,640 |
| Kitsap | 26,904 | 71.34% | 10,702 | 28.38% | 105 | 0.28% | 3 | 0.01% | 16,202 | 42.96% | 37,714 |
| Kittitas | 5,383 | 62.65% | 3,200 | 37.24% | 4 | 0.05% | 5 | 0.06% | 2,183 | 25.41% | 8,592 |
| Klickitat | 3,819 | 67.31% | 1,850 | 32.60% | 4 | 0.07% | 1 | 0.02% | 1,969 | 34.71% | 5,674 |
| Lewis | 12,070 | 63.45% | 6,933 | 36.45% | 13 | 0.07% | 6 | 0.03% | 5,137 | 27.00% | 19,022 |
| Lincoln | 2,299 | 44.10% | 2,911 | 55.84% | 3 | 0.06% | 0 | 0.00% | −612 | −11.74% | 5,213 |
| Mason | 5,514 | 68.32% | 2,549 | 31.58% | 5 | 0.06% | 3 | 0.04% | 2,965 | 36.74% | 8,071 |
| Okanogan | 6,554 | 62.45% | 3,931 | 37.46% | 10 | 0.10% | 0 | 0.00% | 2,623 | 24.99% | 10,495 |
| Pacific | 5,056 | 73.70% | 1,789 | 26.08% | 13 | 0.19% | 2 | 0.03% | 3,267 | 47.62% | 6,860 |
| Pend Oreille | 1,978 | 66.71% | 985 | 33.22% | 1 | 0.03% | 1 | 0.03% | 993 | 33.49% | 2,965 |
| Pierce | 84,566 | 67.13% | 40,164 | 31.88% | 1,190 | 0.94% | 53 | 0.04% | 44,402 | 35.25% | 125,973 |
| San Juan | 906 | 51.77% | 839 | 47.94% | 4 | 0.23% | 1 | 0.06% | 67 | 3.83% | 1,750 |
| Skagit | 14,344 | 63.72% | 8,138 | 36.15% | 24 | 0.11% | 4 | 0.02% | 6,206 | 27.57% | 22,510 |
| Skamania | 1,758 | 72.83% | 653 | 27.05% | 3 | 0.12% | 0 | 0.00% | 1,105 | 45.78% | 2,414 |
| Snohomish | 55,013 | 67.58% | 25,902 | 31.82% | 467 | 0.57% | 23 | 0.03% | 29,111 | 35.76% | 81,405 |
| Spokane | 62,092 | 55.65% | 49,387 | 44.26% | 69 | 0.06% | 33 | 0.03% | 12,705 | 11.39% | 111,581 |
| Stevens | 4,266 | 56.29% | 3,302 | 43.57% | 9 | 0.12% | 1 | 0.01% | 964 | 12.72% | 7,578 |
| Thurston | 17,578 | 65.05% | 9,351 | 34.61% | 80 | 0.30% | 12 | 0.04% | 8,227 | 30.44% | 27,021 |
| Wahkiakum | 1,175 | 72.35% | 446 | 27.46% | 3 | 0.18% | 0 | 0.00% | 729 | 44.89% | 1,624 |
| Walla Walla | 9,481 | 53.89% | 8,102 | 46.05% | 9 | 0.05% | 2 | 0.01% | 1,379 | 7.84% | 17,594 |
| Whatcom | 20,297 | 64.59% | 10,900 | 34.69% | 207 | 0.66% | 18 | 0.06% | 9,397 | 29.90% | 31,422 |
| Whitman | 6,760 | 49.93% | 6,765 | 49.97% | 7 | 0.05% | 6 | 0.04% | −5 | −0.04% | 13,538 |
| Yakima | 29,604 | 56.14% | 22,786 | 43.21% | 326 | 0.62% | 14 | 0.03% | 6,818 | 12.93% | 52,730 |
| Totals | 779,881 | 61.97% | 470,366 | 37.37% | 7,772 | 0.62% | 537 | 0.04% | 309,515 | 24.60% | 1,258,556 |

==== Counties that flipped from Republican to Democratic ====
- Benton
- Chelan
- Columbia
- Cowlitz
- Douglas
- Garfield
- Grant
- Island
- King
- Kittitas
- Klickitat
- Lewis
- San Juan
- Skagit
- Spokane
- Stevens
- Thurston
- Walla Walla
- Whatcom
- Yakima

== See also ==
- United States presidential elections in Washington (state)
