= Chard, Washington =

Unincorporated community in Washington, United States

- Unincorporated community
- Location within Washington (state) Location within the United States
- Coordinates: 46°32′16.53″N 117°51′24.76″W
- Country: United States
- State: Washington
- County: Garfield
- Time zone: UTC-8 (Pacific (PST))
  - Summer (DST): UTC-7 (PDT)
- Area code: 509
- GNIS feature ID: 1510871

Chard is an unincorporated community in Garfield County, in the U.S. state of Washington.

== History ==
A post office called Chard was established in 1887, and remained in operation until 1911.
