= Travois =

Load-dragging structure

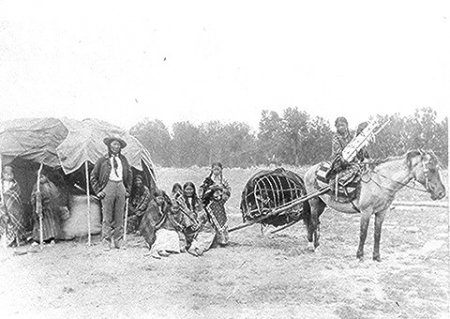
Cheyenne family using a horse-drawn travois, 1890.

A travois (/ˈtrævwɑː/; Canadian French, from French travail; also travoise or travoy) is an A-frame structure used to drag loads over land, most notably by the Plains Indians of North America.

== Construction and use ==
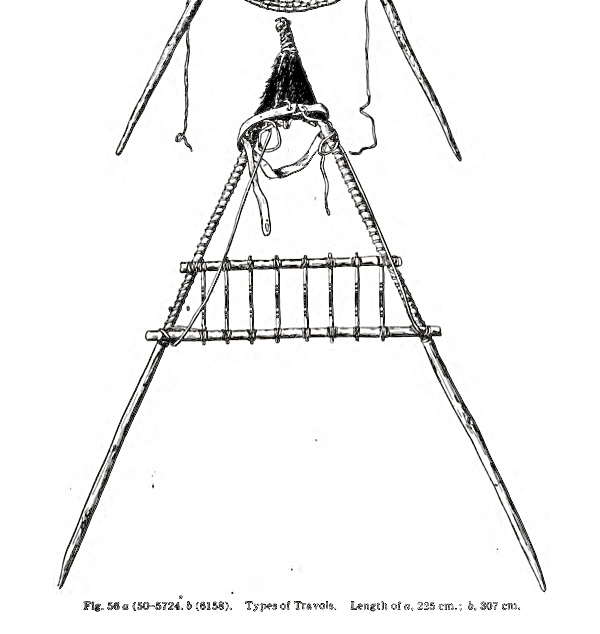
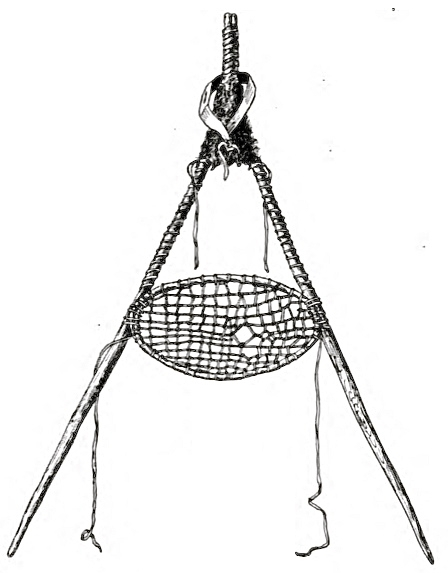
Travois designs used by the Blackfoot people

The basic construction consists of a platform or netting mounted on two long poles, lashed in the shape of an A-frame; the frame is dragged with the sharply pointed end forward. Sometimes the blunt end of the frame is stabilized by a third pole bound across the two poles.

The travois is dragged by hand, sometimes fitted with a shoulder harness for more efficient dragging, or dragged by dogs or horses (after the 16th-century introduction of horses by the Spanish).

A travois can either be loaded by piling goods atop the bare frame and tying them in place, or by first stretching cloth or leather over the frame to hold the load to be dragged.

Although considered more primitive than wheel-based forms of transport, on the type of territory where the travois was used (forest floors, soft soil, snow, etc.), rather than roadways, wheels would have encountered difficulties which would have made them less efficient. As such the travois was employed by coureurs des bois in New France's fur trade with the Plains Tribes.

It is possible for a person to transport more weight on a travois than can be carried on the back.

== Dog travois ==
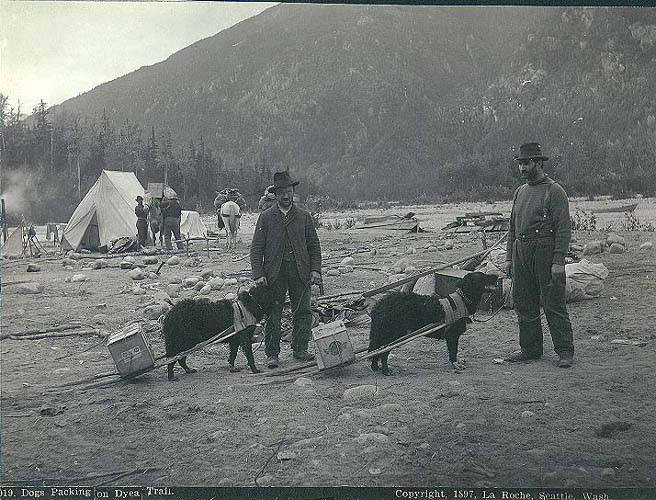
Dog-travois, Alaska 1897

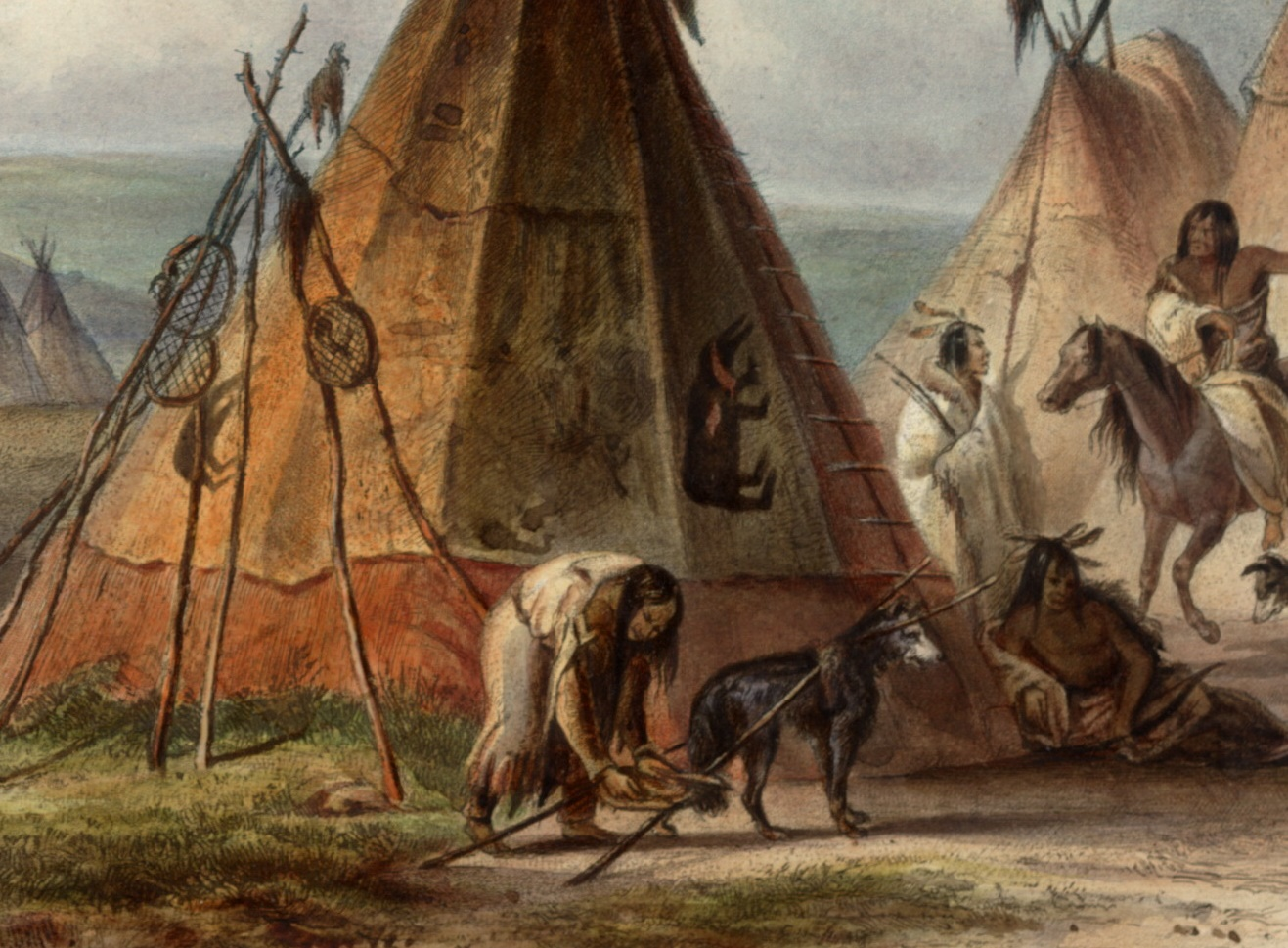
1844 painting showing a dog hitched to a travois, and several propped upright

According to The Canadian Encyclopedia, "The dog travois of pre-European times was small, capable of pulling not more than 20 to 30 kg." Travel by dog travois was slower in hot weather, which is tiring for dogs.

The basic dog travois consists of two aspen or cottonwood poles notched and lashed together at one end with buffalo sinew; the other ends rest splayed apart. Cross-bars are lashed between the poles near the splayed ends, and the finished frame looks like a large letter A with extra cross-bars. The apex of the A, wrapped in buffalo skin to prevent friction burns, rests on a dog's shoulders, while the splayed ends drag over the ground ... First Nations women both built the travois and managed the dogs, sometimes using toy travois to train the puppies. Buffalo meat and firewood were typical travois loads.

== Horse travois ==
By the mid-18th century, the dog travois had given way to the horse travois. According to The Canadian Encyclopedia, "When dogs were replaced by horses, the greater pulling power allowed tipis to increase in size and household goods to multiply." The Native Languages of the Americas website relates that:

After horses were introduced to North America, many Plains Indian tribes began to make larger horse-drawn travois. Instead of making specially constructed travois sleds, they would simply cross a pair of tepee poles across the horse's back and attach a burden platform between the poles behind the horse. This served two purposes at once, as the horses could then simultaneously carry the tepee poles and some additional baggage. Horses, of course, could pull much greater weight than dogs. Children often rode in the back of horse travois.

When traveling with a travois, it was traditional for Salish people to leave the tipi poles behind at the camp "for use by the next tribe or family to camp there."

A horse travois can be made with either A-frame or H-frame construction.

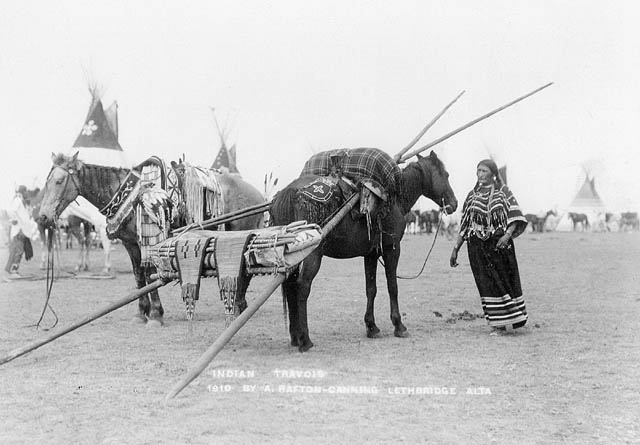
Packhorse and travois, Canada 1910

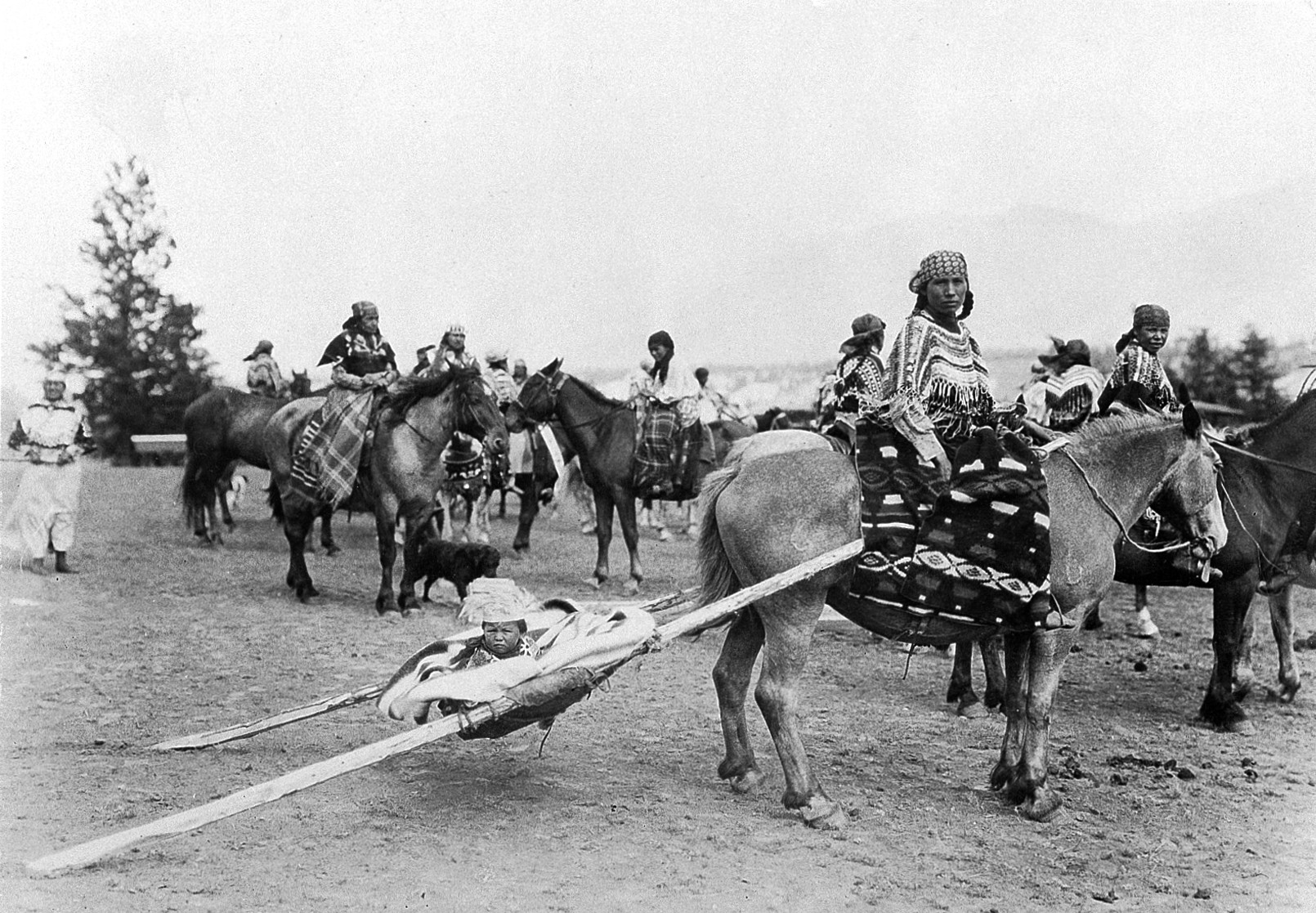
Riding horse with travois, Canada 1922

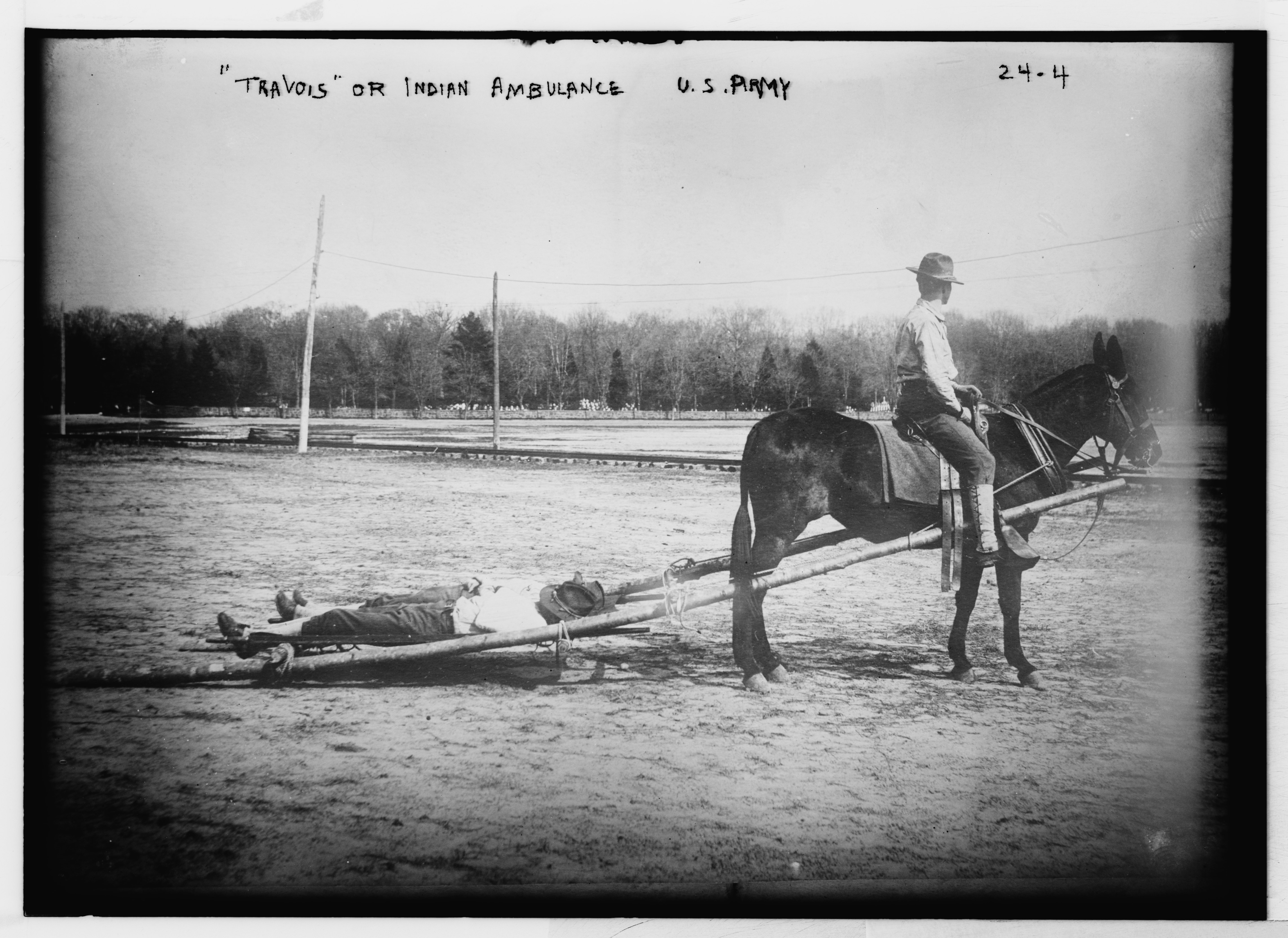
US Army mule and travois "ambulance", circa early 1900s

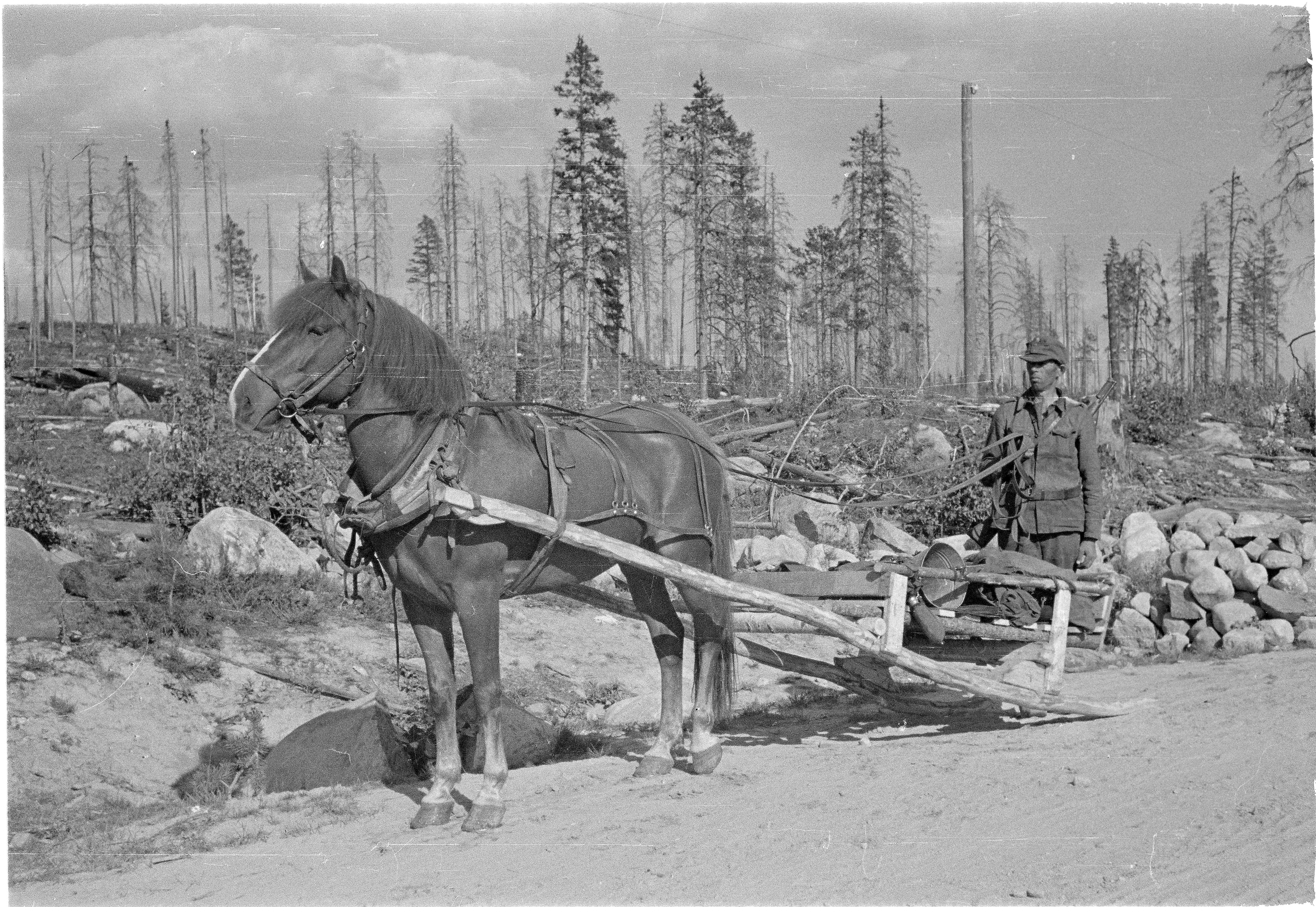
A workman's travois, Finland 1941

== Other ways to use a travois ==
Before the use of horses, Blackfoot women made a curved fence of dog travois tied together, front end up, to hold driven animals enclosed until the hunters could kill them. When the women put up a tipi, they placed an upright horse travois against a tipi pole and used it as a ladder so they could attach the two upper sides of the lodge cover with wooden pins. A travois leaned against a branch of a tree functioned as a simple burial scaffold for a dead Crow baby tied to it.

== Travois tracks ==
What today is known as the Lewis and Clark Trail-Travois Road, and Montana's Lewis and Clark Pass were areas heavily traveled where travois "were dragged over the trail, causing deep, parallel tracks to mark the earth," which are still visible today. Remains of travois tracks can also be seen at the Knife River Indian Villages National Historic Site.

There is archeological evidence to support the thesis that travois were used before the invention of the wheel. Travois tracks have been found in New Mexico dated to 22,000 years ago.

== See also ==
- Lewis and Clark Trail-Travois Road
- Carrying pole
- Sled
