= Pataha, Washington =

Unincorporated community in Washington, United States

Pataha
- Unincorporated community Census designated place
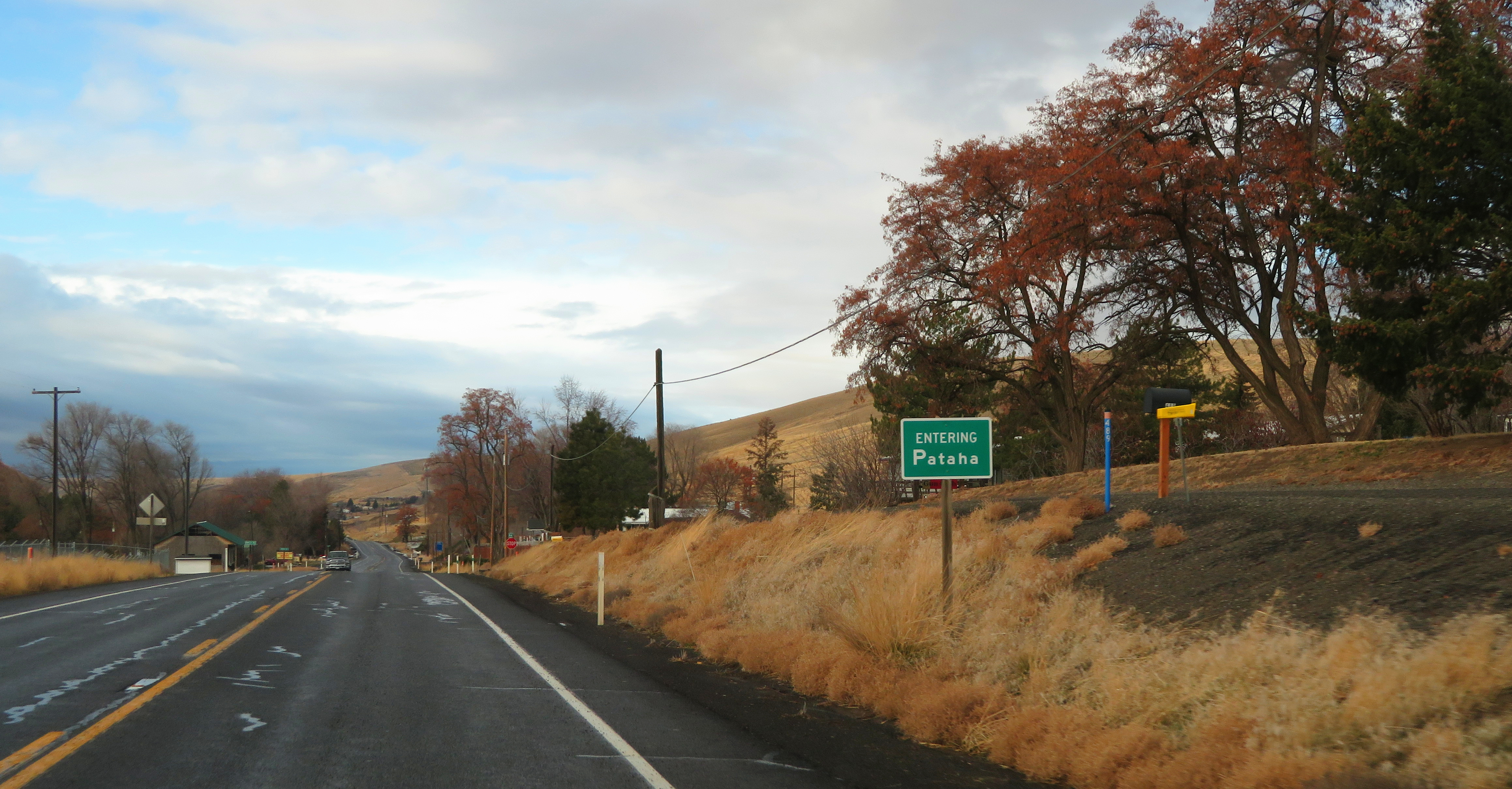

- Location within Washington (state) Location within the United States Location within North America
- Coordinates: 46°28′22″N 117°32′39″W
- Country: United States
- State: Washington
- County: Garfield
- Elevation: 2,011 ft (613 m)
- Time zone: UTC-8 (Pacific (PST))
  - Summer (DST): UTC-7 (PDT)
- ZIP code: 99347
- Area code: 509
- GNIS feature ID: 2807176

Pataha is a small, unincorporated community and census designated place (CDP) in Garfield County, Washington, United States. It is located about 4 miles (6.4 km) east of Pomeroy, the Garfield County seat. As of the 2020 census, Pataha had a population of 106. Pataha is home to the historic Houser Mill, a working water-powered flour mill originally built in 1879.

== Geography ==
Pataha is located along Pataha Creek, about four miles east of Pomeroy, the Garfield County seat. U.S. Route 12 passes from Pomeroy through Pataha as it follows the valley cut by Pataha Creek. The valley is quite steep, only about a mile wide at Pataha and rising more than 300 feet (91 m) above the valley floor within a mile on the north side of the community. The valley reaches heights over 500 feet (150 m) above the floor immediately to the south of Pataha.

== History ==
The town is located on the Pataha Creek along the Nez Perce trail, a path used by the indigenous Nez Perce tribe for crossing the Rocky Mountains. The name Pataha is from the Nez Perce word for 'brush', signifying the dense brush along both sides of the creek.

In May 1806, Lewis and Clark passed through and spent the night on their return journey from the Pacific coast. In 1834, Captain B. L. E. Bonneville passed through the area doing survey work for the US Government.

The community that became Pataha began when James Bowers settled on the site in 1861. The next year a stagecoach line was established between Walla Walla and Lewiston which passed through the area, bringing more settlers. The first settlers were mainly engaged in farming vegetables and cattle ranching, eventually leading to a focus on wheat farming in the 1870s. The area began to grow as a town in 1878 and was officially platted in 1882 by Angevine Titus and Company Favor. The town was briefly known as both 'Favorsburg' and 'Watertown', but the original native placename Pataha prevailed.

Pataha grew into a successful town, rivalling nearby Pomeroy for some time. Pataha was briefly the county seat when Garfield County was created in 1881. The Pataha Spirit newspaper was also established this same year. When the Oregon Railroad and Navigation Company brought a rail line to Pomeroy in 1885, the line was not extended to Pataha. Soon the town lost its competitive edge over its neighbor and began to decline. The flour mill continued to run until 1940.

== Demographics ==
Historical population
Census	Pop.	Note	%±
2020	106		—
U.S. Decennial Census

Pataha first appeared as a census designated place in the 2020 U.S. census.

=== Racial and ethnic composition ===
Pataha CDP, Washington – Racial and ethnic composition Note: the US Census treats Hispanic/Latino as an ethnic category. This table excludes Latinos from the racial categories and assigns them to a separate category. Hispanics/Latinos may be of any race.
Race / Ethnicity (NH = Non-Hispanic)	Pop 2020	2020
White alone (NH)	97	91.51%
Black or African American alone (NH)	0	0.00%
Native American or Alaska Native alone (NH)	1	0.94%
Asian alone (NH)	0	0.00%
Native Hawaiian or Pacific Islander alone (NH)	0	0.00%
Other race alone (NH)	0	0.00%
Mixed race or Multiracial (NH)	4	3.77%
Hispanic or Latino (any race)	4	3.77%
Total	106	100.00%
