= Lewis and Clark Trail-Travois Road =

- Lewis and Clark Trail–Travois Road
- U.S. National Register of Historic Places
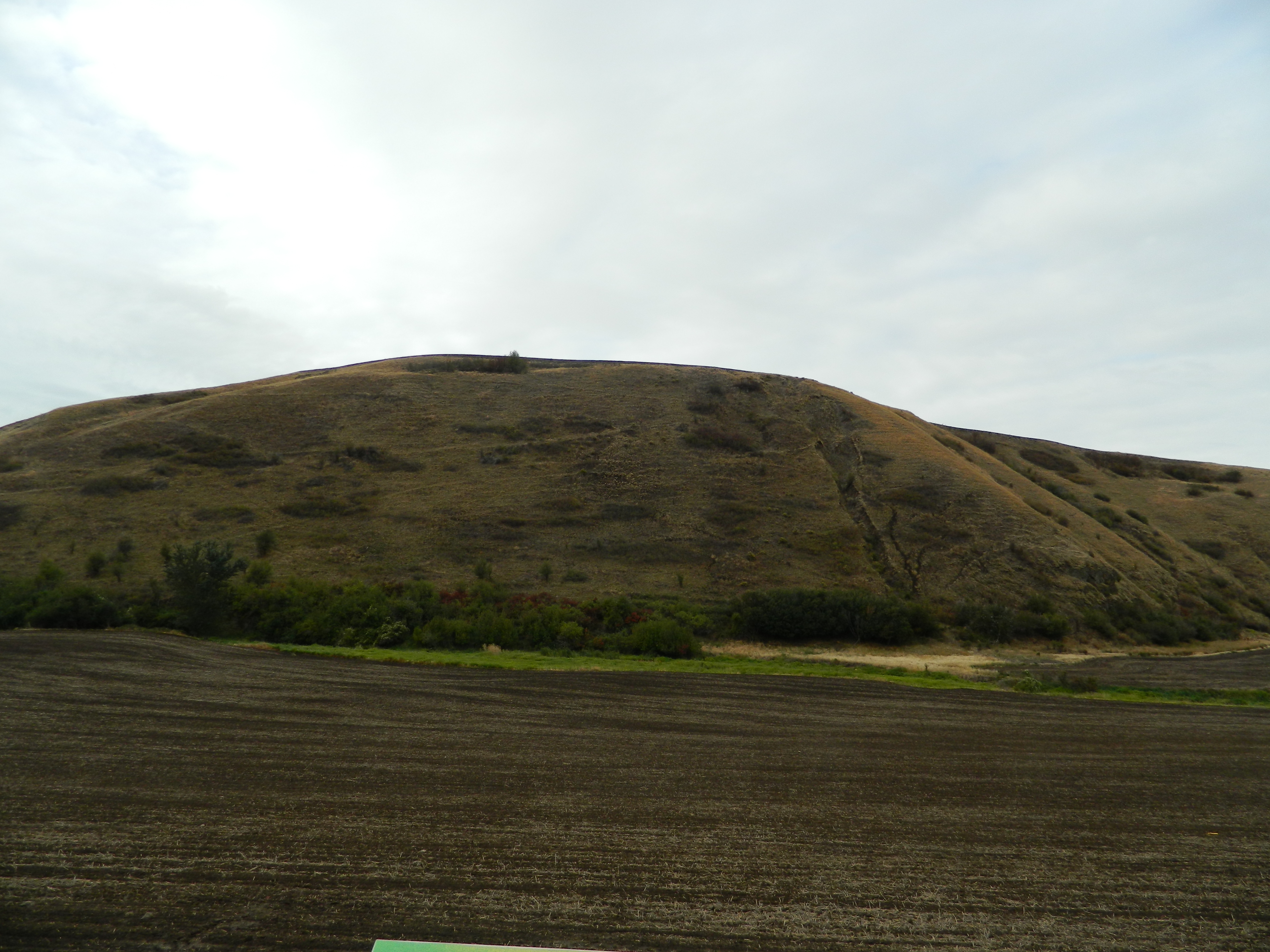
- Trail in the foreground

- Location within Washington (state) Location within the United States
- Location: 5 miles (8.0 km) east of Pomeroy on US 12
- Nearest city: Pomeroy, Washington
- Coordinates: 46°27′51.4″N 117°28′46.06″W
- Area: 5 acres (2.0 ha)
- NRHP reference No.: 74001952
- Added to NRHP: January 11, 1974

The Lewis and Clark Trail–Travois Road is a 5-acre (2.0 ha) historic site located 5 miles (8.0 km) east of Pomeroy, Washington, on U.S. Route 12 (US 12). It is a surviving stretch of Indian travois trail followed by Lewis and Clark in their 1805–06 expedition and mentioned in their writings. It was listed on the National Register of Historic Places in 1974.

The site is significant for the 1805–06 event, for including "a trail that was very important in aboriginal times", and for its information potential. It seems to have been described by Meriwether Lewis, who wrote on May 3, 1806: "...we Continued Still up the Creek bottoms ... to the place at which the roade leaves the [Pataha] Creek and assends the hill up to the high plains: here we Encamped in a Small grove of Cotton trees...".

Travois were used by American Indians to transport possessions by means of two long poles slung with a hammock trailing behind a horse or dog. The deep, parallel tracks caused by the dragging poles are still visible today in a quarter-mile (0.4 km) section of the original trail, sometimes called the Nez Perce Trail, followed by the Lewis and Clark Expedition and preserved at this site.
