= Sherman County Courthouse (Oregon) =

- U.S. National Register of Historic Places
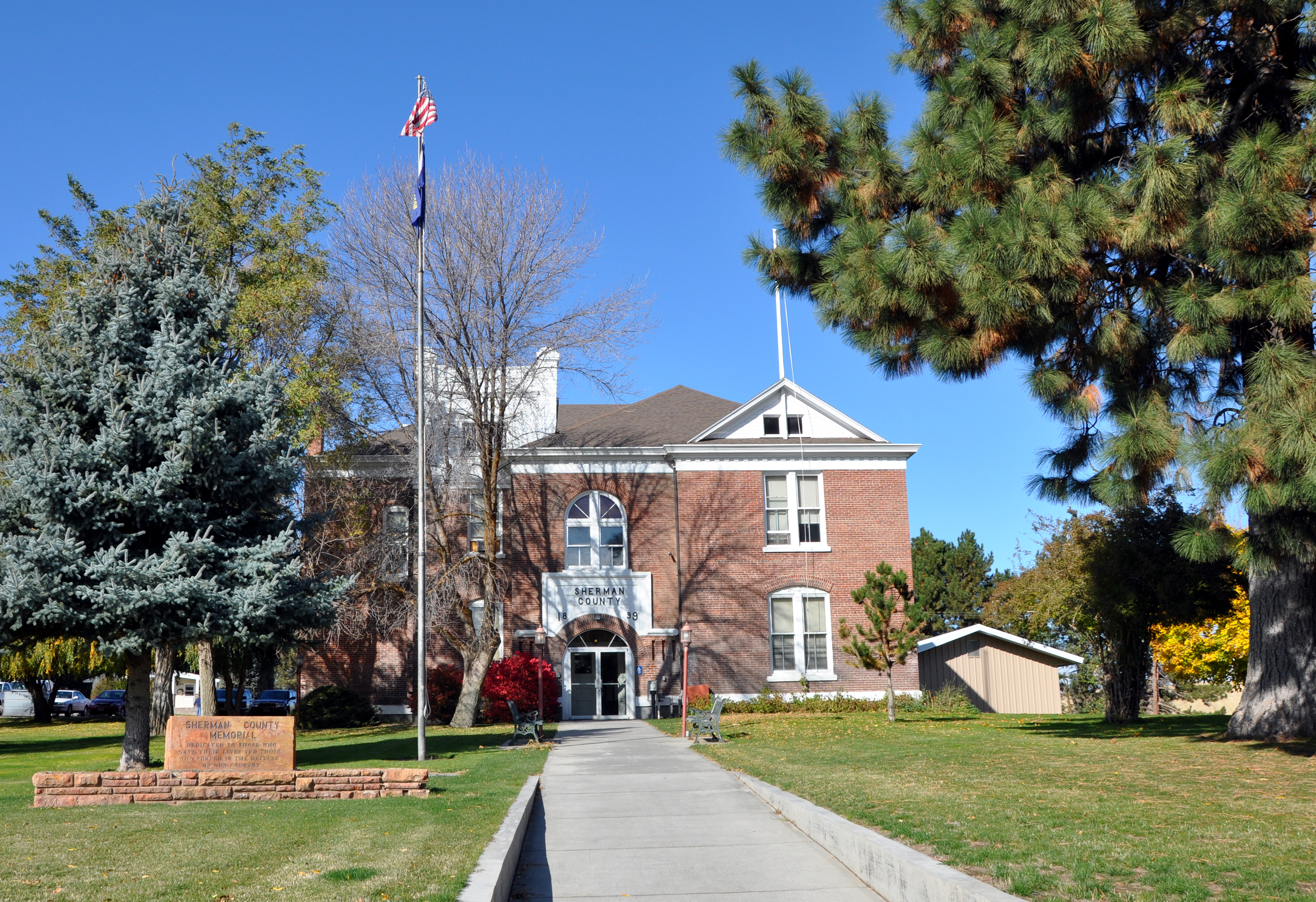

- Location within Oregon Location within the United States
- Interactive map showing the location of Sherman County Courthouse
- Location: 500 Court Street, Moro, Oregon
- Coordinates: 45°24′23″N 120°44′0″W
- Area: 1.3 acres (0.53 ha)
- Built: 1899
- Built by: Peterson, A.F.
- Architect: Burggraf, Charles H.
- Architectural style: Queen Anne
- NRHP reference No.: 98001122
- Added to NRHP: August 28, 1998

The Sherman County Courthouse is a Queen Anne-style building located in Moro, Oregon listed on the National Register of Historic Places.

It is located at 500 Court Street. It was designed by prolific architect Charles H. Burggraf and built by A.F. Peterson in 1899. It was listed on the NRHP in 1998; the listing included three contributing buildings.

== See also ==
- National Register of Historic Places listings in Sherman County, Oregon
