= Alpowa Summit =

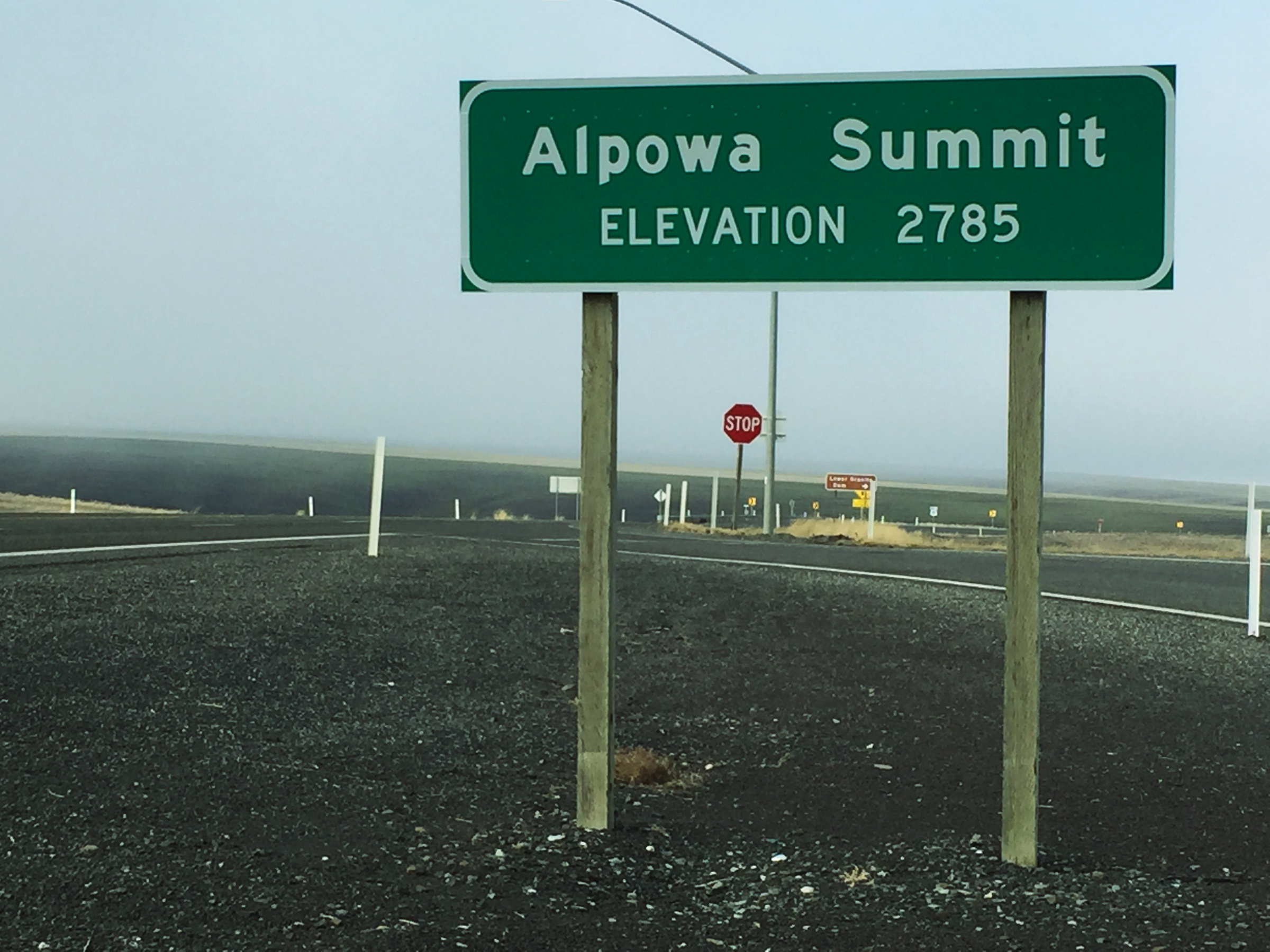
- Road sign at the summit

- Location within Washington (state) Location within the United States
- Elevation: 2,785 ft (849 m)
- Traversed by: U.S. Route 12

Location
- Location: Garfield County, Washington, U.S.
- Range: Blue Mountains
- Coordinates: 46°26′08″N 117°25′26″W

Alpowa Summit (el. 2785 ft./849 m.) is a mountain pass in the state of Washington. The pass connects Pomeroy on the west with Clarkston on the east. The pass separates the Blue Mountains' foothills on the south with the rolling Palouse to the north. The Washington State portion of U.S. Route 12 connects the cities of Lewiston, Idaho and Walla Walla, Washington by passing over this summit.

== History ==
In May 1806 the Lewis and Clark Expedition passed over the Alpowa Summit on their return trip to the United States. A historic market at the Alpowa Summit Rest Area commemorates this event. A stage road connecting Walla Walla in the west with Lewiston in the east was established in 1862. Initial settlement of the Alpowa Summit area was constrained to livestock grazing until 1870, when farmers growing grain began to work the fertile prairie land surrounding the summit.

== Geography ==
Alpowa Summit is located in Garfield County in Southeastern Washington, between the city of Pomeroy on the west and Clarkston to the east. U.S. Route 12 traverses the summit at an elevation of 2,785 feet above sea level. It ascends Pataha Creek and Sweeney Gulch from the west and descends into the Snake River valley to the east through Megginson Gulch. While referred to as a summit, the terrain continues to rise to the south of the highway along Alpowa Ridge, to a height of 3,425 feet, and ultimately higher into the Blue Mountains. Where U.S. 12 meets the Snake River the elevation is 750 feet, while the town of Pomeroy to the west sits at 1,850 feet.
