= Waldo Hall =

Building on the Oregon State University campus in Corvallis, Oregon, U.S.

Coordinates: 44.56410°N 123.27716°W

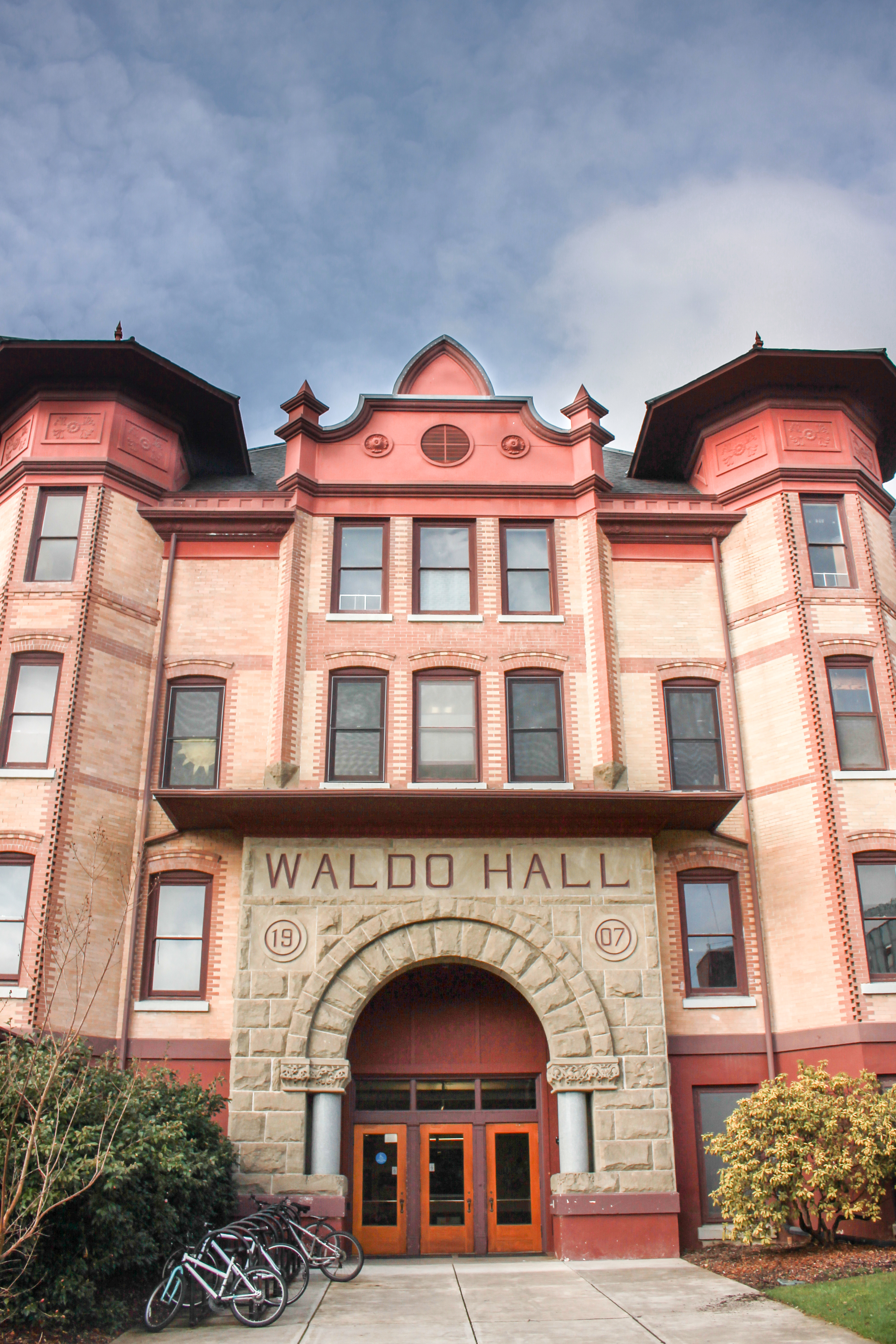
- Interactive map of the Waldo Hall area

General information
- Location: Corvallis, Oregon

Waldo Hall is a building on the Oregon State University (OSU) campus in Corvallis, Oregon, United States. The building's fourth floor, inaccessible to the public, is one of several reportedly haunted sites on campus.

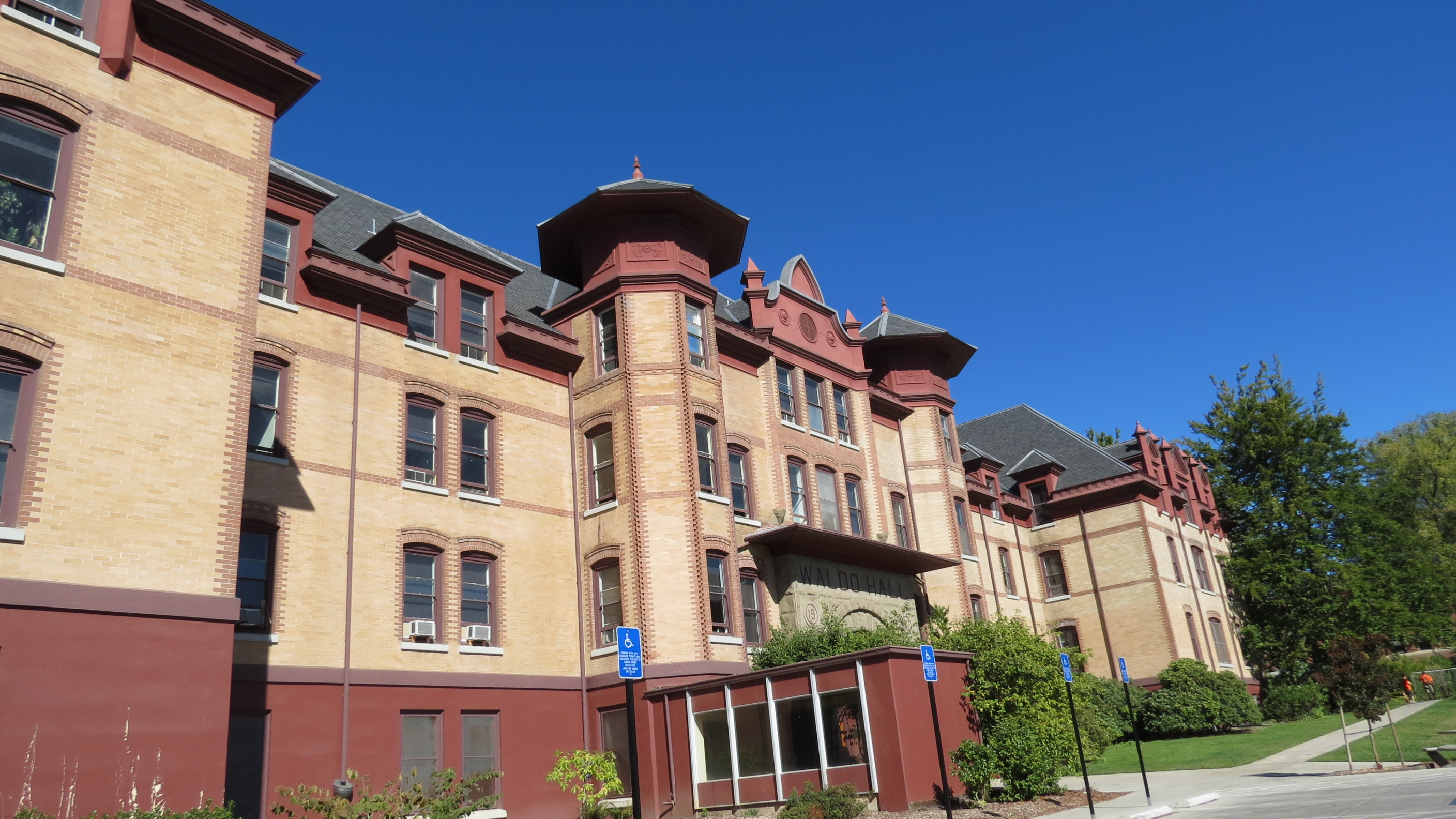
The building's exterior, 2012

Waldo Hall was named in 1907 for Clara H. Waldo, the wife of pioneer and Oregon supreme court judge John B. Waldo. She served on OSU's board of regents and was the first woman in the U.S. to serve on the board of a state college. She was also the first woman to address an OSU graduation class.

== See also ==
- Reportedly haunted locations in Oregon
