= Garfield County, Washington =

County in Washington, United States

- County
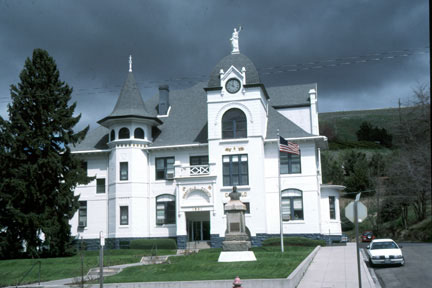
- Garfield County Courthouse in Pomeroy

- Location within the U.S. state of Washington
- Coordinates: 46°26′N 117°32′W
- Country: United States
- State: Washington
- Founded: November 29, 1881
- Named for: James A. Garfield
- Seat: Pomeroy
- Largest city: Pomeroy

Area
  - Total: 718 sq mi (1,860 km^{2})
  - Land: 711 sq mi (1,840 km^{2})
  - Water: 7.5 sq mi (19 km^{2}) 1.0%

Population (2020)
  - Total: 2,286
  - Estimate (2025): 2,416 ▲
  - Density: 3.1/sq mi (1.2/km^{2})
- Time zone: UTC−8 (Pacific)
  - Summer (DST): UTC−7 (PDT)
- Congressional district: 5th
- Website: www.garfieldcountywa.gov

Garfield County is a county located in the U.S. state of Washington. As of the 2020 census, the population was 2,286, making it the least populous county in Washington; with about 3.2 inhabitants per square mile (1.2/km^{2}), it is also the least densely populated county in Washington. The county seat and only city is Pomeroy.

== History ==
The area delineated by the future Washington state boundary began to be colonized at the start of the nineteenth century, both by Americans and British. However, the majority of British exploration and interest in the land was due to the fur trade, whereas American settlers were principally seeking land for agriculture and cattle raising. The Treaty of 1818 provided for the creation of a British and American condominium over the region. During this period, the future Washington Territory was divided into two administrative zones, Clark County and Lewis County, officially in 1845. However, the condominium arrangement was unwieldy, leading to continuous disputes and occasional conflict; it was abolished by an 1846 treaty that established a boundary between British and American possessions that survives as today's Canada–United States border.

In 1854, Skamania County was split from the original Clark County and Walla Walla County was split from the new Skamania County. In 1875, Columbia County was split from Walla Walla County, and on November 29, 1881, a portion of Columbia County was set off to form Garfield County. The original Garfield County was reduced in size in 1883 when its southeastern area was partitioned off to form Asotin County. It was named for the late U.S. President James A. Garfield, who had been assassinated two months earlier.

== Geography ==
According to the United States Census Bureau, the county has a total area of 718 square miles (1,860 km^{2}), of which 711 square miles (1,840 km^{2}) is land and 7.5 square miles (19 km^{2}) (1.0%) is water. It is part of the Palouse, a wide and rolling prairie-like region of the middle Columbia basin.

=== Geographic features ===
- Alpowa Summit
- Snake River

=== Major highway ===
- U.S. Route 12
- State Route 127

=== Adjacent counties ===
- Whitman County - north
- Asotin County - east
- Wallowa County, Oregon - south
- Columbia County - west

=== National protected area ===
- Umatilla National Forest (part)

== Demographics ==
Historical population
Census	Pop.	Note	%±
1890	3,897		—
1900	3,918		0.5%
1910	4,199		7.2%
1920	3,875		−7.7%
1930	3,662		−5.5%
1940	3,383		−7.6%
1950	3,204		−5.3%
1960	2,976		−7.1%
1970	2,911		−2.2%
1980	2,468		−15.2%
1990	2,248		−8.9%
2000	2,397		6.6%
2010	2,266		−5.5%
2020	2,286		0.9%
2025 (est.)	2,416	▲	5.7%
U.S. Decennial Census; 1790–1960 1900–1990; 1990–2000 2010–2020

=== 2020 census ===
As of the 2020 census, the county had a population of 2,286. Of the residents, 21.3% were under the age of 18 and 27.1% were 65 years of age or older; the median age was 48.1 years. For every 100 females there were 103.9 males, and for every 100 females age 18 and over there were 103.0 males. 0.0% of residents lived in urban areas and 100.0% lived in rural areas.

Garfield County, Washington – Racial and ethnic composition Note: the US Census treats Hispanic/Latino as an ethnic category. This table excludes Latinos from the racial categories and assigns them to a separate category. Hispanics/Latinos may be of any race.
Race / Ethnicity (NH = Non-Hispanic)	Pop 2000	Pop 2010	Pop 2020	% 2000	% 2010	% 2020
White alone (NH)	2,304	2,102	2,055	96.12%	92.76%	89.90%
Black or African American alone (NH)	0	0	3	0.00%	0.00%	0.13%
Native American or Alaska Native alone (NH)	9	5	18	0.38%	0.22%	0.79%
Asian alone (NH)	15	38	9	0.63%	1.68%	0.39%
Pacific Islander alone (NH)	1	0	0	0.04%	0.00%	0.00%
Other race alone (NH)	1	4	5	0.04%	0.18%	0.22%
Mixed race or Multiracial (NH)	20	26	86	0.83%	1.15%	3.76%
Hispanic or Latino (any race)	47	91	110	1.96%	4.02%	4.81%
Total	2,397	2,266	2,286	100.00%	100.00%	100.00%

The racial makeup of the county was 91.8% White, 0.4% Black or African American, 0.8% American Indian and Alaska Native, 0.5% Asian, 1.2% from some other race, and 5.3% from two or more races. Hispanic or Latino residents of any race comprised 4.8% of the population.

There were 964 households in the county, of which 27.6% had children under the age of 18 living with them and 19.8% had a female householder with no spouse or partner present. About 27.4% of all households were made up of individuals and 16.0% had someone living alone who was 65 years of age or older.

There were 1,194 housing units, of which 19.3% were vacant. Among occupied housing units, 74.8% were owner-occupied and 25.2% were renter-occupied. The homeowner vacancy rate was 2.1% and the rental vacancy rate was 12.3%.

=== 2010 census ===
As of the 2010 census, there were 2,266 people, 989 households, and 650 families living in the county. The population density was 3.2 inhabitants per square mile (1.2/km^{2}). There were 1,233 housing units at an average density of 1.7 units per square mile (0.66 units/km^{2}). The racial makeup of the county was 93.8% white, 1.7% Asian, 0.3% American Indian, 2.3% from other races, and 1.9% from two or more races. Those of Hispanic or Latino origin made up 4.0% of the population. In terms of ancestry, 27.2% were German, 22.4% were English, 19.9% were Irish, 7.9% were Dutch, 5.5% were Swedish, and 3.4% were American.

Of the 989 households, 25.1% had children under the age of 18 living with them, 55.6% were married couples living together, 6.1% had a female householder with no husband present, 34.3% were non-families, and 30.2% of all households were made up of individuals. The average household size was 2.25 and the average family size was 2.79. The median age was 49.0 years.

The median income for a household in the county was $42,469 and the median income for a family was $55,769. Males had a median income of $38,897 versus $30,650 for females. The per capita income for the county was $22,825. About 14.1% of families and 15.7% of the population were below the poverty line, including 22.1% of those under age 18 and 6.6% of those age 65 or over.

=== 2000 census ===
As of the 2000 census, there were 2,397 people, 987 households, and 670 families living in the county. The population density was 3 people per square mile (1.2 people/km^{2}). There were 1,288 housing units at an average density of 2 units per square mile (0.77 units/km^{2}). The racial makeup of the county was 96.45% White, 0.38% Native American, 0.67% Asian, 0.04% Pacific Islander, 1.38% from other races, and 1.08% from two or more races. 1.96% of the population were Hispanic or Latino of any race. 28.8% were of German, 17.9% United States or American, 10.6% English and 9.5% Irish ancestry. 99.2% spoke English as their first language.

There were 987 households, out of which 28.80% had children under the age of 18 living with them, 57.00% were married couples living together, 6.70% had a female householder with no husband present, and 32.10% were non-families. 28.30% of all households were made up of individuals, and 14.40% had someone living alone who was 65 years of age or older. The average household size was 2.39 and the average family size was 2.93.

In the county, the population was spread out, with 25.90% under the age of 18, 5.40% from 18 to 24, 21.90% from 25 to 44, 25.90% from 45 to 64, and 20.90% who were 65 years of age or older. The median age was 43 years. For every 100 females there were 97.90 males. For every 100 females age 18 and over, there were 93.80 males.

The median income for a household in the county was $33,398, and the median income for a family was $41,645. Males had a median income of $33,313 versus $22,132 for females. The per capita income for the county was $16,992. About 12.00% of families and 14.20% of the population were below the poverty line, including 17.10% of those under age 18 and 10.20% of those age 65 or over.

== Communities ==
=== City ===
- Pomeroy (county seat)

=== Unincorporated communities ===
- Chard
- Dodge
- Gould City
- Mayview
- Mentor
- Pataha
- Peola

=== Ghost town ===
- Unfried

== In popular culture ==
Part of the 1996 film Black Sheep takes place in Garfield County, but was not filmed there.

== Politics ==
Garfield County has consistently voted for Republican candidates in presidential elections throughout its history. In only four elections since 1896 have more voters chosen the Democratic candidate, the most recent being the 1964 election. In 1912 the plurality of votes went instead to the Progressive Party candidate, former Republican president Theodore Roosevelt.

United States presidential election results for Garfield County, Washington
Year	Republican		Democratic		Third party(ies)	
Year	No.	%	No.	%	No.	%
1892	351	36.26%	288	29.75%	329	33.99%
1896	378	43.20%	482	55.09%	15	1.71%
1900	528	52.59%	437	43.53%	39	3.88%
1904	777	70.32%	267	24.16%	61	5.52%
1908	556	58.53%	333	35.05%	61	6.42%
1912	345	22.16%	426	27.36%	786	50.48%
1916	845	52.26%	728	45.02%	44	2.72%
1920	869	66.03%	370	28.12%	77	5.85%
1924	875	65.25%	324	24.16%	142	10.59%
1928	1,004	70.60%	412	28.97%	6	0.42%
1932	669	44.42%	818	54.32%	19	1.26%
1936	652	38.83%	983	58.55%	44	2.62%
1940	1,003	58.08%	714	41.34%	10	0.58%
1944	925	57.38%	677	42.00%	10	0.62%
1948	749	48.92%	747	48.79%	35	2.29%
1952	1,157	66.76%	559	32.26%	17	0.98%
1956	966	60.15%	639	39.79%	1	0.06%
1960	914	56.88%	690	42.94%	3	0.19%
1964	751	49.02%	781	50.98%	0	0.00%
1968	841	53.03%	602	37.96%	143	9.02%
1972	1,004	65.45%	481	31.36%	49	3.19%
1976	892	57.18%	616	39.49%	52	3.33%
1980	875	57.60%	509	33.51%	135	8.89%
1984	913	63.94%	493	34.52%	22	1.54%
1988	714	54.13%	593	44.96%	12	0.91%
1992	620	46.93%	473	35.81%	228	17.26%
1996	623	49.64%	497	39.60%	135	10.76%
2000	982	73.89%	300	22.57%	47	3.54%
2004	935	70.83%	365	27.65%	20	1.52%
2008	968	70.50%	385	28.04%	20	1.46%
2012	913	71.44%	336	26.29%	29	2.27%
2016	851	68.30%	279	22.39%	116	9.31%
2020	1,069	71.79%	366	24.58%	54	3.63%
2024	973	71.97%	330	24.41%	49	3.62%

== See also ==
- National Register of Historic Places listings in Garfield County, Washington
