= Garfield County Courthouse (Washington) =

Historic courthouse in Pomeroy, Washington, United States

- U.S. National Register of Historic Places
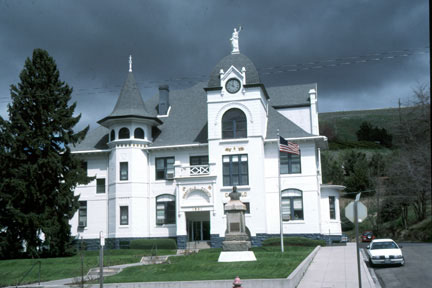
- Photo by Calvin Beale

- Location within Washington (state) Location within the United States
- Interactive map showing the location of Garfield County Courthouse
- Location: 8th and Main Sts., Pomeroy, Washington
- Coordinates: 46°28′30″N 117°36′4″W
- Area: Less than one acre
- Built: 1901
- Built by: Isle, August
- Architect: Burggraf, Charles
- Architectural style: Late Victorian
- NRHP reference No.: 74001951
- Added to NRHP: July 24, 1974

The Garfield County Courthouse is a historic courthouse in Pomeroy, Washington, United States, that is listed on the National Register of Historic Places (NRHP).

== Description ==
The courthouse is located at 8th and Main streets and was built in 1901. It is of Late Victorian architecture, designed by Charles Burggraf and built by Spokane contractor August Isle. It was identified as "one of several elaborate county courthouses constructed in Washington around the turn of the century" when it was listed on the National Register of Historic Places in 1974.

== History ==
The courthouse was built in 1901 after the citizens of Garfield County authorized a $20,000 bond for the construction of a new courthouse to replace the 1887 wood-frame courthouse lost in the 1900 fire that destroyed much of the Pomeroy's commercial center. Albany, Oregon, architect Charles H. Burggraf was hired to design the new courthouse. After bids for the project were taken in March 1901, August Ilse of Spokane won the contract with a bid of $18,783. The specification called for brick and stone construction; the stone was quarried locally from the Valentine Ridge area near the Snake River. The brick was from a local kiln; the shakes were from the Blue Mountains.

The statue of Justice that caps the clock tower is only one of twenty statues nationwide where the justice figure is not blindfolded. According to the City Council minutes of August 2, 1904, authorization was given to install a clock in the clock tower. A Civil War statue, erected by the G.A.R., was placed in front of the courthouse in 1904 at the Fourth of July celebration. Due to deterioration, the statue was removed in the 1950s. In 2000, the VFW Post #2351 and the Garfield County Pioneer Society funded and dedicated the new bronze Civil War statue that rests on top of the original marble base that is engraved with the names of the county's veterans.

After the statue of Justice lost its left arm to a windstorm in 2006, an emergency grant from the Valerie Sivinski Washington Preserves Fund helped defray the cost of repairs.

Restoration

A two-year, two-million dollar restoration project was completed in 2011. The work was supported through a one-million dollar matching grant from the Department of Archaeology & Historic Preservation's Historic County Courthouse Rehabilitation Grant Program. The project, which was designed to structurally stabilize the building while preserving key architectural elements, saw the restoration of existing windows and the addition of ADA-compliant features. The work also included the removal of earlier renovations deemed to be not in keeping with the building's historic character including the removal of drop ceilings in the courtroom and the re-opening of the courtroom gallery that had been closed off for use as a storage space. The facelift was one of two winners of the Valerie Sivinski Award for Outstanding Achievement in Historic Preservation Rehabilitation Projects in 2012.

== See also ==
- National Register of Historic Places listings in Garfield County, Washington
