= Mayview, Washington =

Unincorporated community in Washington, United States

- Unincorporated community
- Location within Washington (state) Location within the United States
- Coordinates: 46°37′52″N 117°27′57″W
- Country: United States
- State: Washington
- County: Garfield
- Elevation: 2,202 ft (671 m)
- Time zone: UTC-8 (Pacific (PST))
  - Summer (DST): UTC-7 (PDT)
- ZIP code: 99347
- Area code: 509
- GNIS feature ID: 1511132

Mayview is an unincorporated community in Garfield County, in the U.S. state of Washington.

== History ==
Mayview was founded in 1880. A post office called May View was established in 1879, and remained in operation until 1959.
