= Pomeroy, Washington =

City in Washington, United States

- City
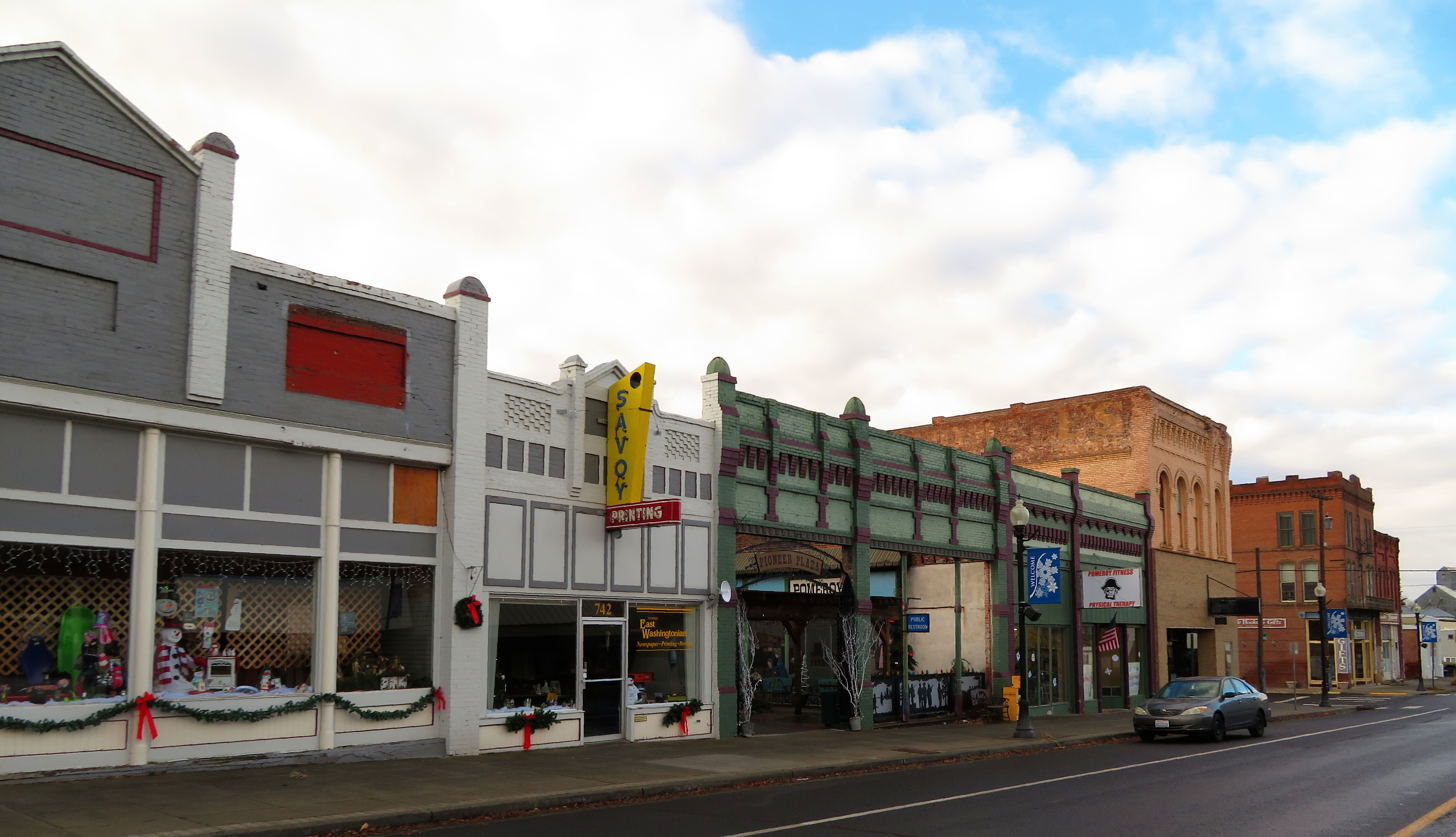
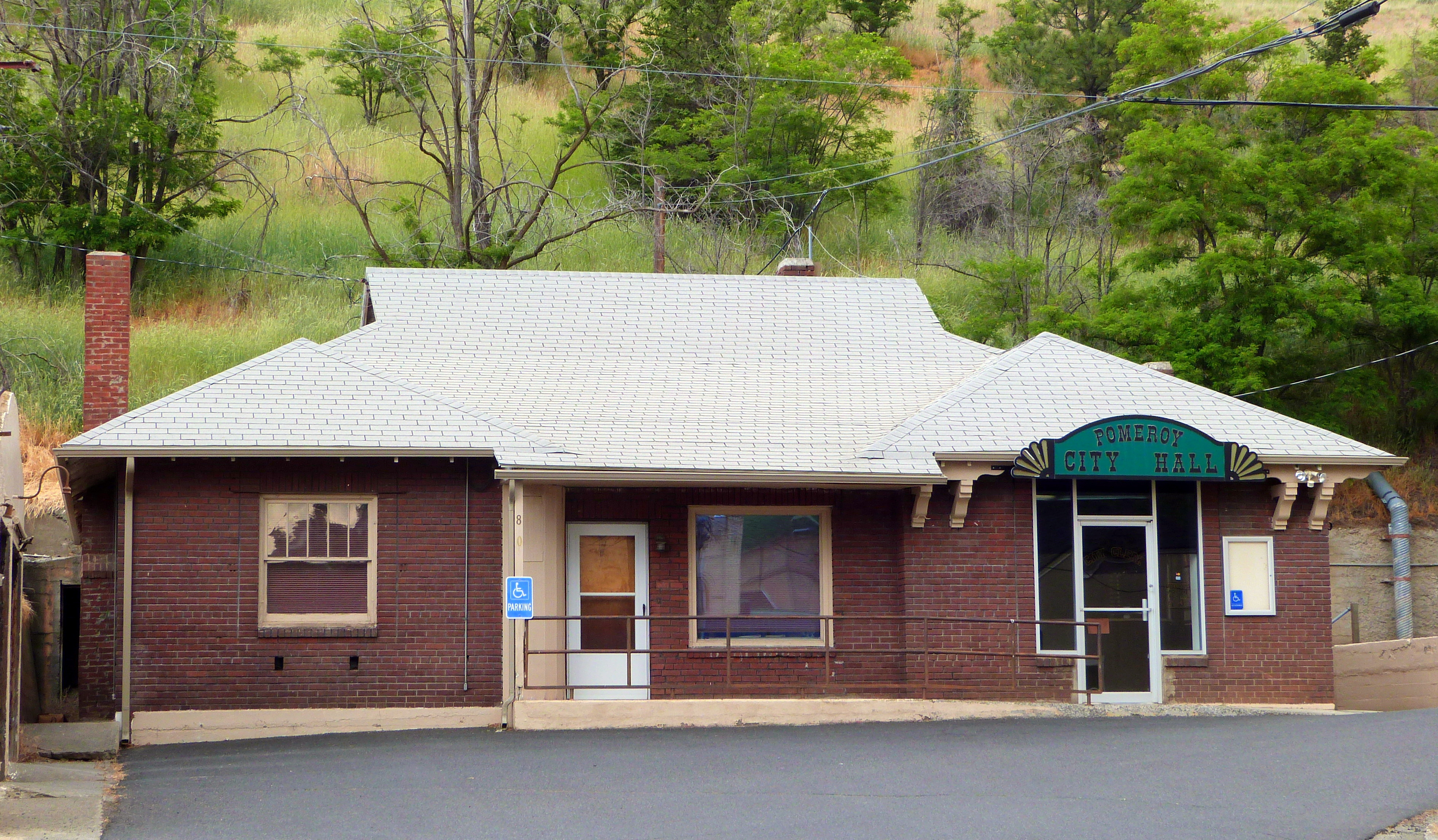
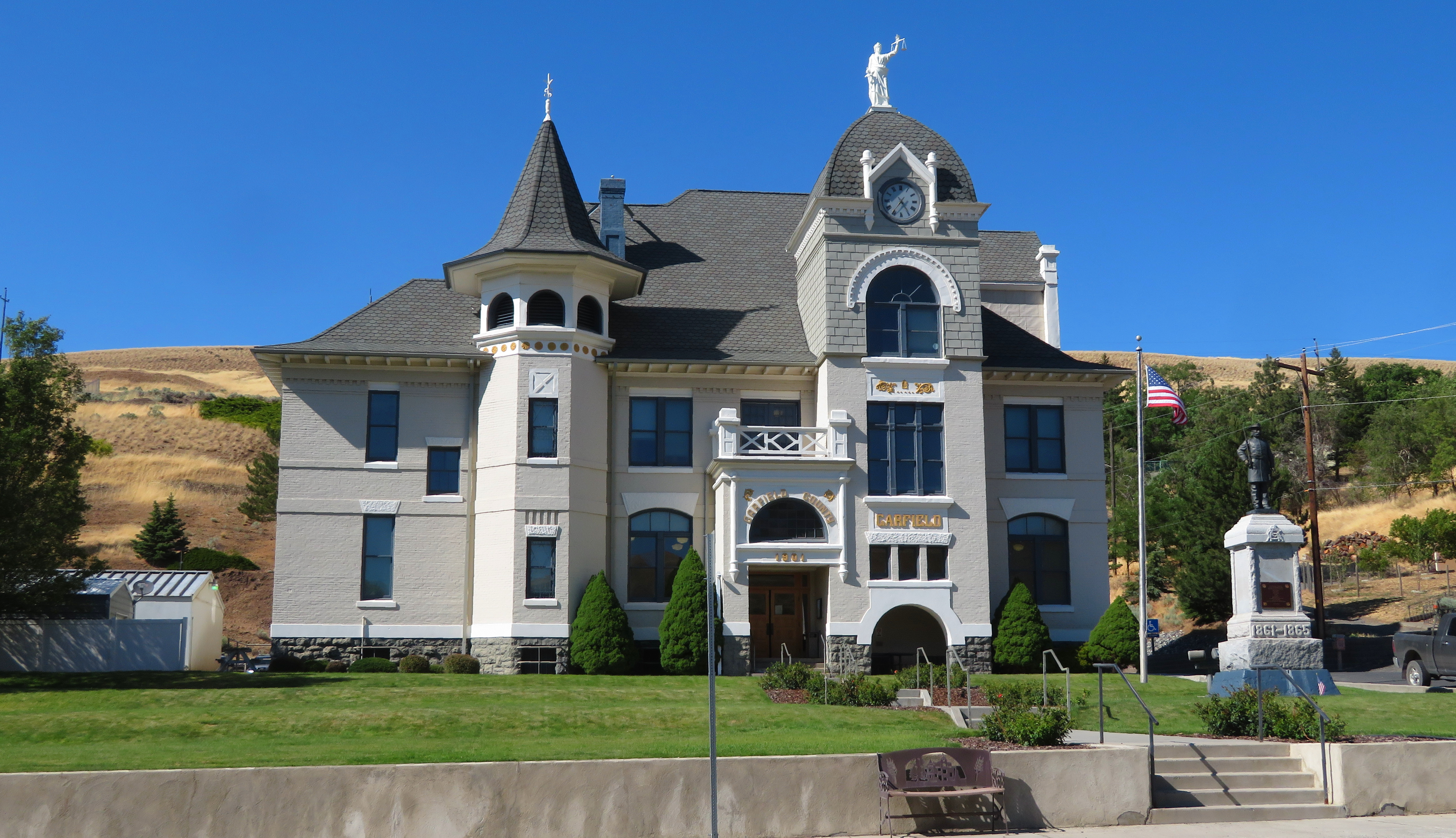
- Downtown Pomeroy in 2018 Pomeroy City Hall Garfield County Courthouse
- Interactive location map of Pomeroy
- Coordinates: 46.473760°N 117.596541°W
- Country: United States
- State: Washington
- County: Garfield
- Founded: May 28, 1878
- Incorporated: February 3, 1886

Government
  - Mayor: Jack Peasley

Area
  - Total: 1.776 sq mi (4.601 km^{2})
  - Land: 1.776 sq mi (4.601 km^{2})
  - Water: 0 sq mi (0.000 km^{2}) 0.0%
- Elevation: 1,870 ft (570 m)

Population (2020)
  - Total: 1,389
  - Estimate (2024): 1,471
  - Density: 781.9/sq mi (301.9/km^{2})
- Time zone: UTC−8 (Pacific (PST))
  - Summer (DST): UTC−7 (PDT)
- ZIP Code: 99347
- Area code: 509
- FIPS code: 53-55120
- GNIS feature ID: 2411453
- Website: cityofpomeroy1.com

Pomeroy is the county seat of Garfield County, Washington, United States and the only incorporated city in the county. The population was 1,389 at the 2020 census, and was estimated at 1,471 in 2024.

== History ==
The Nez Perce trail existed in the area before history was recorded, and the first written record of caucasians passing through the area were Lewis and Clark in 1805. Captain Benjamin Bonneville also passed through the future site of the town while he was surveying for the US government in 1834. In 1860, an Irish settler named Parson Quinn settled just east of present-day Pomeroy, and lived there for the next 40 years. Rancher Joseph M. Pomeroy purchased the land in 1864, and platted the town's site in May 1878.

Pomeroy was officially incorporated on February 3, 1886. The town has been the seat of Garfield County since 1882, despite fierce competition in the 1880s with neighboring towns Pataha and Asotin. The county was split in October 1883, and the city of Asotin was named the county seat of the new Asotin County, Washington, leaving the debate about Pomeroy's status as county seat for Garfield County to continue. The debate continued through both houses of the Washington Territorial Legislature in for the remainder of 1883 to Governor William A. Newell of the Washington Territory, and eventually reached the United States Congress in 1884.

Despite a city ordinance which mandated fire-proof materials for downtown buildings after fires in 1890 and 1898, on July 18, 1900 a blaze destroyed half of the small town's business district. The recovery took two years as the destroyed buildings were rebuilt using brick which led to a building boom for the small community. In 1912, the city voted to outlaw the manufacture or sale of alcohol. The prohibition quickly led to rampant bootlegging and corruption which lasted until the 21st Amendment passed in 1933.

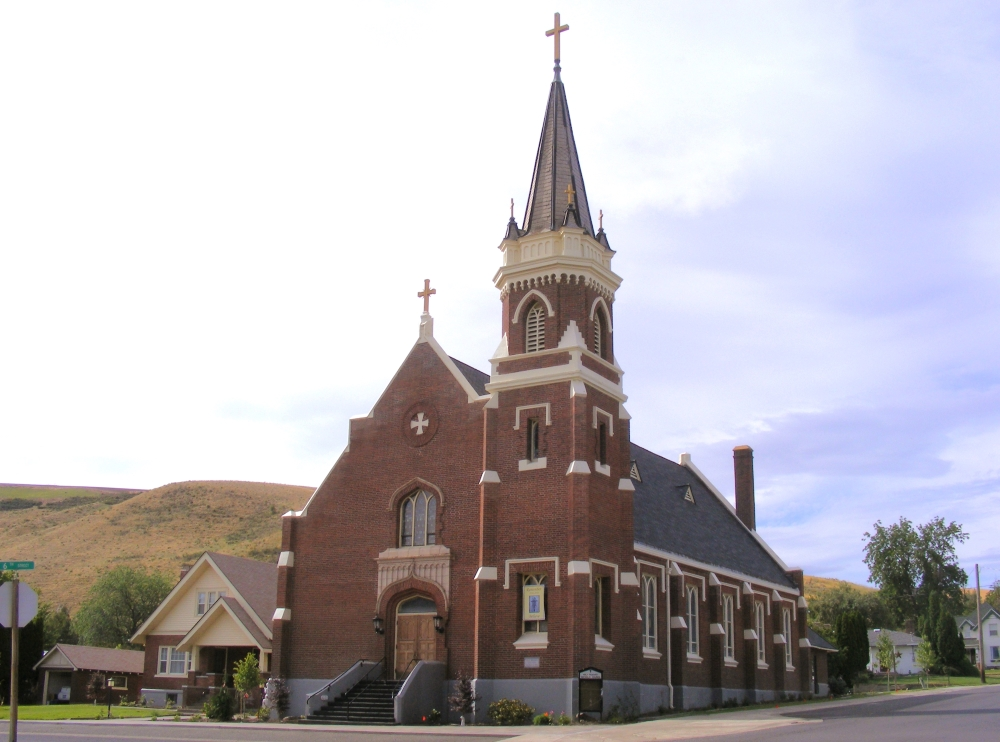
The Catholic Church in Pomeroy, Washington, United States.

On August 21, 2003, following efforts by the Pomeroy Historic Committee, a 10-block section of the Downtown Pomeroy Historic District was placed on the National Historic Register.

== Geography ==
According to the United States Census Bureau, the city has a total area of 1.776 square miles (4.60 km^{2}), all land.

U.S. Route 12 in Washington serves as the primary highway through town, connecting Pomeroy with the Lewiston–Clarkston metropolitan area (to the east) and the Tri-Cities metro area/Walla Walla area (to the west). The city is 1,857 ft above sea level in the very hilly region between the Blue Mountains (to the south) and the Palouse region (to the north). The primary highway through town passes over Alpowa Summit (2,785 ft) only a few miles east of town.

== Climate ==
Pomeroy, as is typical for this region, has a borderline Mediterranean/continental Mediterranean climate (Köppen Csb/Dsb) with dry summers featuring warm to hot afternoons and cool to warm mornings, and chilly, cool, or cold and snowy, if not severe, and wetter winters.

Climate data for Pomeroy, Washington (1991–2020 normals, extremes 1891–2020)
Month	Jan	Feb	Mar	Apr	May	Jun	Jul	Aug	Sep	Oct	Nov	Dec	Year
Record high °F (°C)	67 (19)	71 (22)	80 (27)	98 (37)	101 (38)	102 (39)	112 (44)	109 (43)	102 (39)	93 (34)	78 (26)	72 (22)	112 (44)
Mean maximum °F (°C)	58.2 (14.6)	59.3 (15.2)	67.6 (19.8)	75.8 (24.3)	83.2 (28.4)	91.4 (33.0)	98.4 (36.9)	99.1 (37.3)	91.3 (32.9)	79.9 (26.6)	64.7 (18.2)	57.7 (14.3)	100.2 (37.9)
Mean daily maximum °F (°C)	40.4 (4.7)	44.5 (6.9)	52.0 (11.1)	58.6 (14.8)	67.3 (19.6)	74.4 (23.6)	85.1 (29.5)	85.1 (29.5)	75.4 (24.1)	60.9 (16.1)	47.7 (8.7)	39.5 (4.2)	60.9 (16.1)
Daily mean °F (°C)	33.8 (1.0)	36.4 (2.4)	42.3 (5.7)	47.9 (8.8)	55.6 (13.1)	61.5 (16.4)	69.0 (20.6)	69.0 (20.6)	60.3 (15.7)	48.9 (9.4)	39.6 (4.2)	32.9 (0.5)	49.8 (9.9)
Mean daily minimum °F (°C)	27.1 (−2.7)	28.3 (−2.1)	32.6 (0.3)	37.3 (2.9)	43.9 (6.6)	48.5 (9.2)	52.9 (11.6)	52.8 (11.6)	45.2 (7.3)	37.0 (2.8)	31.5 (−0.3)	26.3 (−3.2)	38.6 (3.7)
Mean minimum °F (°C)	9.2 (−12.7)	13.7 (−10.2)	19.4 (−7.0)	25.6 (−3.6)	29.9 (−1.2)	37.6 (3.1)	42.5 (5.8)	40.9 (4.9)	32.6 (0.3)	21.5 (−5.8)	15.3 (−9.3)	18.0 (−7.8)	0.9 (−17.3)
Record low °F (°C)	−22 (−30)	−17 (−27)	6 (−14)	11 (−12)	20 (−7)	30 (−1)	35 (2)	33 (1)	24 (−4)	5 (−15)	−13 (−25)	−27 (−33)	−27 (−33)
Average precipitation inches (mm)	2.04 (52)	1.62 (41)	2.08 (53)	1.67 (42)	1.60 (41)	1.15 (29)	0.46 (12)	0.53 (13)	0.58 (15)	1.31 (33)	2.32 (59)	2.27 (58)	17.63 (448)
Average snowfall inches (cm)	2.2 (5.6)	1.2 (3.0)	0.8 (2.0)	0.1 (0.25)	0.0 (0.0)	0.0 (0.0)	0.0 (0.0)	0.0 (0.0)	0.0 (0.0)	0.0 (0.0)	0.5 (1.3)	3.6 (9.1)	8.4 (21.25)
Average precipitation days (≥ 0.01 in)	12.2	10.4	11.5	9.7	9.2	6.7	3.0	3.2	3.7	7.3	12.6	12.0	101.5
Average snowy days (≥ 0.1 in)	1.2	0.7	0.5	0.0	0.0	0.0	0.0	0.0	0.0	0.0	0.7	1.6	4.7
Source 1: NOAA
Source 2: National Weather Service

== Demographics ==
Historical population
Census	Pop.	Note	%±
1890	661		—
1900	953		44.2%
1910	1,605		68.4%
1920	1,804		12.4%
1930	1,600		−11.3%
1940	1,723		7.7%
1950	1,775		3.0%
1960	1,677		−5.5%
1970	1,823		8.7%
1980	1,716		−5.9%
1990	1,393		−18.8%
2000	1,517		8.9%
2010	1,425		−6.1%
2020	1,389		−2.5%
2024 (est.)	1,471		5.9%
U.S. Decennial Census; 2020 Census

=== 2020 census ===
As of the 2020 census, Pomeroy had a population of 1,389. The median age was 51.1 years. 19.9% of residents were under the age of 18 and 29.5% of residents were 65 years of age or older. For every 100 females there were 98.4 males, and for every 100 females age 18 and over there were 97.5 males age 18 and over.

0.0% of residents lived in urban areas, while 100.0% lived in rural areas.

There were 601 households in Pomeroy, of which 25.3% had children under the age of 18 living in them. Of all households, 49.1% were married-couple households, 18.6% were households with a male householder and no spouse or partner present, and 24.5% were households with a female householder and no spouse or partner present. About 30.4% of all households were made up of individuals and 19.1% had someone living alone who was 65 years of age or older.

There were 713 housing units, of which 15.7% were vacant. The homeowner vacancy rate was 3.3% and the rental vacancy rate was 16.9%.

Racial composition as of the 2020 census
Race	Number	Percent
White	1,262	90.9%
Black or African American	7	0.5%
American Indian and Alaska Native	14	1.0%
Asian	5	0.4%
Native Hawaiian and Other Pacific Islander	0	0.0%
Some other race	16	1.2%
Two or more races	85	6.1%
Hispanic or Latino (of any race)	83	6.0%

=== 2010 census ===
As of the 2010 census, there were 1,425 people, 642 households, and 401 families residing in the city. The population density was 800.6 inhabitants per square mile (309.1/km^{2}). There were 723 housing units at an average density of 406.2 per square mile (156.8/km^{2}). The racial makeup of the city was 94.9% White, 0.3% Native American, 1.3% Asian, 1.3% from other races, and 2.2% from two or more races. Hispanic or Latino of any race were 3.2% of the population.

There were 642 households, of which 25.1% had children under the age of 18 living with them, 50.8% were married couples living together, 7.5% had a female householder with no husband present, 4.2% had a male householder with no wife present, and 37.5% were non-families. 34.0% of all households were made up of individuals, and 19.4% had someone living alone who was 65 years of age or older. The average household size was 2.16 and the average family size was 2.74.

The median age in the city was 50 years. 19.6% of residents were under the age of 18; 5.1% were between the ages of 18 and 24; 18.6% were from 25 to 44; 32.5% were from 45 to 64; and 24.4% were 65 years of age or older. The gender makeup of the city was 47.5% male and 52.5% female.

=== 2000 census ===
As of the 2000 census, there were 1,517 people, 645 households, and 408 families residing in the city. The population density was 852.2 people per square mile (329.1/km^{2}). There were 740 housing units at an average density of 415.7 per square mile (160.5/km^{2}). The racial makeup of the city was 96.37% White, 0.53% Native American, 0.40% Asian, 0.07% Pacific Islander, 1.52% from other races, and 1.12% from two or more races. Hispanic or Latino of any race were 2.24% of the population.

There were 645 households, out of which 25.3% had children under the age of 18 living with them, 51.0% were married couples living together, 7.3% had a female householder with no husband present, and 36.7% were non-families. 33.0% of all households were made up of individuals, and 18.1% had someone living alone who was 65 years of age or older. The average household size was 2.29 and the average family size was 2.92.

In the city, the age distribution of the population shows 25.5% under the age of 18, 5.6% from 18 to 24, 20.1% from 25 to 44, 23.5% from 45 to 64, and 25.2% who were 65 years of age or older. The median age was 44 years. For every 100 females, there were 91.1 males. For every 100 females age 18 and over, there were 84.9 males.

The median income for a household in the city was $28,958, and the median income for a family was $38,750. Males had a median income of $32,500 versus $21,118 for females. The per capita income for the city was $15,782. About 11.7% of families and 15.1% of the population were below the poverty line, including 22.9% of those under age 18 and 9.5% of those age 65 or over.

== Arts and culture ==
Annual events hosted by the Pomeroy Chamber of Commerce include the Pioneer Day and Tumbleweed Festival held the second weekend in June, the Garfield County Fair in September, and the Starlight Parade and Festival of Trees which begins after Thanksgiving.

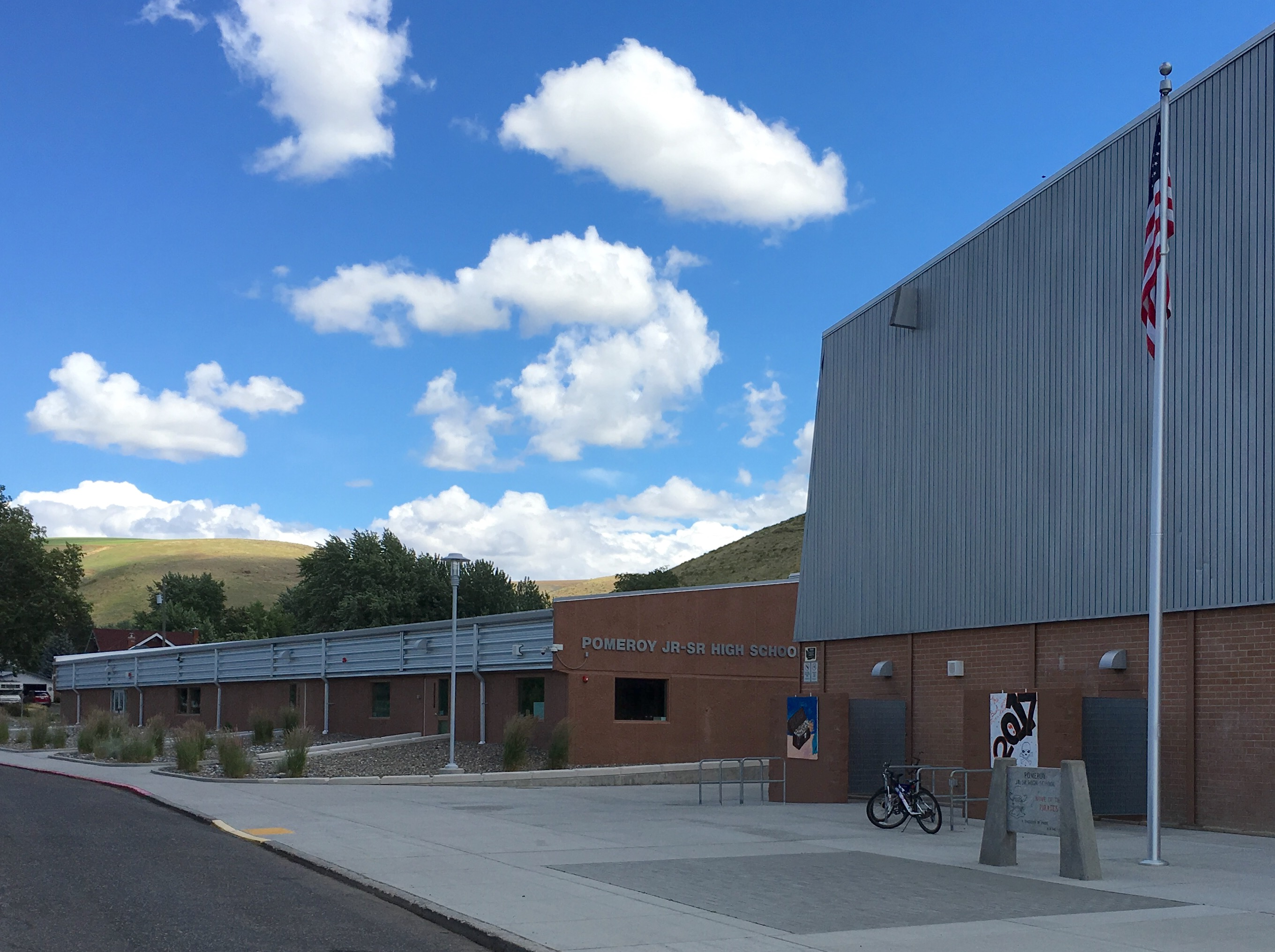
Pomeroy Junior/Senior High School, 2016

== Education ==
Students in Pomeroy are part of Pomeroy School District 110 and complete their secondary public school education at Pomeroy Junior/Senior High School.

== Notable people ==
- Samuel G. Cosgrove (1847–1909), 6th governor of Washington
- Mary Dye - Politician. Member of Washington House of Representatives.
- Elgin V. Kuykendall (1870–1958), attorney, judge, and member of the Washington State Senate
- Michael P. Malone (1940–1999), historian and president of Montana State University
