= National Register of Historic Places listings in Asotin County, Washington =

Location of Asotin County in Washington

This list presents the full set of buildings, structures, objects, sites, or districts designated on the National Register of Historic Places in Asotin County, Washington, and offers brief descriptive information about each of them. The National Register recognizes places of national, state, or local historic significance across the United States. Out of over 90,000 National Register sites nationwide, Washington is home to approximately 1,500, and 8 of those are found in Asotin County.

This National Park Service list is complete through NPS recent listings posted March 21, 2025.

== Current listings ==
	Name on the Register	Image	Date listed	Location	City or town	Description
1	Clarkston Public Library	Clarkston Public Library	August 3, 1982 (#82004193)	1001 6th Street; 46°24′38″N 117°02′43″W	Clarkston	Carnegie library built in 1913.
2	Cloverland Garage	Cloverland Garage	May 2, 1986 (#86000895)	Along Cloverland Road, about 0.11 miles (0.18 km) from its junction with Roupe Road; 46°15′07″N 117°15′03″W	Cloverland	
3	Full Gospel Church	Full Gospel Church	January 19, 1972 (#72001266)	305 1st Street; 46°20′28″N 117°03′05″W	Asotin	
4	Grande Ronde River Bridge	Grande Ronde River Bridge	March 28, 1995 (#95000262)	On State Route 129, about 23 miles (37 km) southwest of Asotin; 46°02′30″N 117°15′09″W	Asotin	Built in 1941 over Grande Ronde River, this was perhaps the first steel girder bridge in the state highway system, and is still in use.
5	Indian Timothy Memorial Bridge	Indian Timothy Memorial Bridge	July 16, 1982 (#82004194)	Spans Alpowa Creek, about 8 miles (13 km) west of Clarkston; 46°24′43″N 117°12′48″W	Clarkston	Only concrete tied arch bridge in the state, built in 1923. Stands parallel to current bridge.
6	Snake River Archeological District	Snake River Archeological District	May 13, 1976 (#76001868)	Address restricted	Asotin	
7	U.S. Post Office – Clarkston Main	U.S. Post Office – Clarkston Main	May 30, 1991 (#91000642)	949 6th Street; 46°24′40″N 117°02′43″W	Clarkston	Buff-colored brick post office building which has a low-relief sculpted eagle within an aluminum grille on its front facade.
8	C. C. Van Arsdol House	C. C. Van Arsdol House	May 6, 1975 (#75001839)	1011 15th Street; 46°24′38″N 117°04′07″W	Clarkston	A home of civil engineer Cassius C. Van Arsdol.

== See also ==
- National Register of Historic Places listings in Washington state
- Listings in neighboring counties: Garfield, Nez Perce, Wallowa, Whitman
- Historic preservation
- History of Washington (state)
- Index of Washington (state)-related articles
