= Asotin Creek =

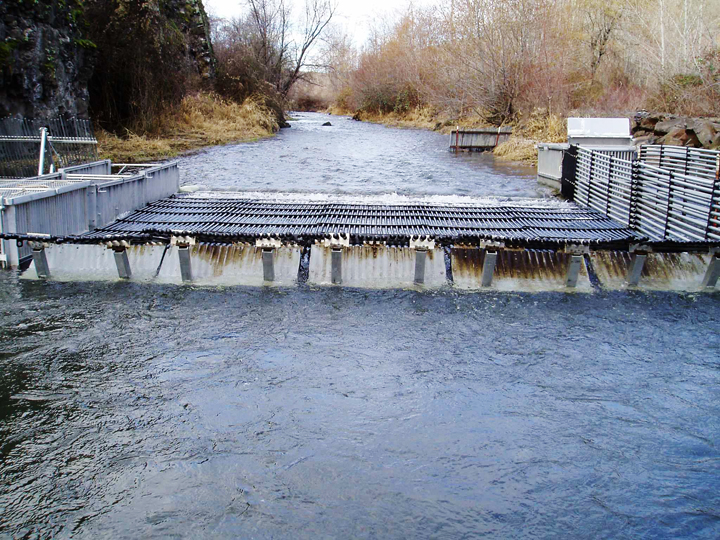
- Fish weir on lower Asotin Creek, 2010

- Location within Washington (state)

Location
- Country: United States
- State: Washington

Physical characteristics
- Source: Confluence of North and South Forks
  - location: Near Cloverland, WA
  - coordinates: 46°16′21″N 117°17′31″W
  - elevation: 1,847 ft (563 m)
- Mouth: Snake River
  - location: Asotin, WA
  - coordinates: 46°20′37″N 117°03′12″W
  - elevation: 738 ft (225 m)
- Length: 15.5 mi (24.9 km)
- Basin size: 325 mi^{2} (840 km^{2})
- Discharge
  - location: about 0.1 mi (0.16 km) from the mouth
  - average: 97 cu ft/s (2.7 m^{3}/s)
  - minimum: 17 cu ft/s (0.48 m^{3}/s)
  - maximum: 5,050 cu ft/s (143 m^{3}/s)

Asotin Creek (also known historically as the Asotin River) is a tributary of the Snake River in Asotin County, southeastern Washington. The creek's main stem is 15.5 miles (24.9 km) long, and measured to the head of its longest tributary its length is 33.7 miles (54.2 km). It flows into the Snake River at the town of Asotin, about 5 miles (8.0 km) south of Lewiston–Clarkston. Asotin Creek drains about 325 square miles (840 km^{2}) of mostly semi-arid plateau country on the northeastern flank of the Blue Mountains.

The creek's name is derived from the Nez Perce for "eel", from the abundance of freshwater eels caught there. The town of Asotin in 1878 and Asotin County in 1883 both were named after the creek.

== Course ==
Asotin Creek is formed by the confluence of its north and south forks near the unincorporated community of Cloverland. The North Fork, 18.2 miles (29.3 km) long, begins near the historic Clearwater fire lookout tower in the Umatilla National Forest in Garfield County about 5,600 ft (1,700 m) above sea level. It flows east through a canyon, receiving Middle Branch and South Fork creeks from the right, before crossing into Asotin County. The 14.9-mile (24.0 km) long South Fork starts near Wickiup Campground, also in the Umatilla National Forest about 6,000 ft (1,800 m) in elevation. From its origin in eastern Garfield County, it flows almost immediately northeast into Asotin County and turns north towards its confluence with the North Fork.

The main stem descends northeast then east down a canyon in the Blue Mountain foothills. Shortly below the confluence of the forks, it receives Charley Creek from the left. Most of the main stem flows through private ranchland, though the Headgate County Park provided public access and a small fishing pond, but was sold in 2023 by the county to a private individual. After the county park, it passes a U.S. Geological Survey stream gauge station and then reaches the unincorporated community of Jerry, where George Creek joins from the right. It then flows into the Snake River at Chief Looking Glass Park in Asotin, 145 miles (233 km) upstream of the Snake's confluence with the Columbia River, and across the Snake from Hells Gate State Park. State Route 129 crosses the creek just above its mouth.

== Watershed ==
Most land in the Asotin Creek watershed is privately owned, with the primary land uses being grazing in the valley slopes and river bottoms (about 43% of the watershed) and dryland farming on the plateaus (about 26%). Wheat and barley are the main crops grown in this area. Almost a third of cropland in the Asotin watershed is managed under the U.S. Department of Agriculture (USDA)'s Conservation Reserve Program, which pays farmers to leave highly erodible land out of production. Since the 1940s, extensive conservation efforts including terracing and sediment basins have reduced topsoil loss, which is a significant issue across much of the Palouse region of southeastern Washington.

About 30% of the watershed, mostly at high elevations, is forested. Most of the forest land is managed by the U.S. Forest Service as part of the Umatilla National Forest, with smaller areas managed by the Washington Department of Natural Resources (DNR) and Washington Department of Fish and Wildlife (DFW) or privately owned. The mixed conifer forests consist primarily of ponderosa pine and Douglas fir, with western larch, subalpine fir and lodgepole pine at the highest elevations, and western red cedar, Engelmann spruce and grand fir in wetter low elevation soils.

The area experiences a continental climate, with temperatures ranging from −20 °F (−29 °C) in winter to 105 °F (41 °C) in summer. Precipitation ranges from 12 inches (300 mm) at the confluence with the Snake River to 45 inches (1,100 mm) at the summit of the Blue Mountains.

Geologically, the Asotin Creek watershed sits atop Columbia River basalts, which erupted from underground fissures 6–17 million years ago. From about 5.4–2.4 million years ago, tectonic activity uplifted the basalts to form the Columbia Plateau. The creeks cut into the landscape to form steep valleys separated by flat-topped ridges. The basalts are topped by Ice Age fluvial deposits from the Bonneville flood, about 14,000 or 15,000 years old, and windblown loess deposits of sediment carried by the Missoula Floods in the same period.

== History ==
The confluence of Asotin Creek with the Snake River was used as a winter camp by the Alpowai band of Nez Perce, who favored the area which was sheltered from cold winter weather. About twenty other seasonal Nez Perce camps were located upstream and along tributaries of the creek. In addition to the plentiful freshwater eels for which the place was named, the creek supported large runs of steelhead trout and chinook salmon. The Nez Perce name for this place, first recorded in English as "Has-hu-tin" or "Hassotin", was eventually simplified to "Asotin" by the Board of Geographic Names in 1897. Archeological evidence from nearby Alpowa Creek suggests that humans have occupied this region for at least 6,000 years.

A major Nez Perce trail from what is now Lewiston ran along the creek from the Snake River all the way up to the confluence of the forks. From there it climbed towards summer hunting grounds in the Blue Mountains, by way of what is now called Smoothing Iron Ridge. The trail then passed by Wickiup Springs, near the headwaters of the South Fork, before continuing west to Mount Misery and points beyond.

The first Europeans to see the mouth of Asotin Creek were the Lewis and Clark Expedition in 1805. Lewis and Clark met with Chief Apash Wyakaikt, who came to be known by the whites as "Looking Glass" after being gifted a mirror by the expedition. The name was passed down to his son Looking Glass, who would become a key figure in the Nez Perce War. Other explorers who passed through this area include fur traders Wilson Price Hunt and John Work around 1810–12, though they left no written records of the place. In 1834, Benjamin Bonneville led an expedition for the American Fur Company through the area and was hosted by Apash Wyakaikt at the Asotin village, where they "enjoyed a great feast, fine accommodations, and an array of entertainment". Bonneville noted the area's potential for agriculture, though the first homesteaders would not arrive for another thirty years or so.

Under pressure from encroaching settlement, the 1855 Treaty of Walla Walla established a reservation for the Nez Perce that encompassed parts of southeast Washington, northeast Oregon and western Idaho, including the entirety of what is now Asotin County. Within a few years, gold was discovered nearby and prospectors flocked to the area. The Nez Perce appealed to the federal government to enforce the treaty, but were instead forced into an even smaller reservation on the Idaho side in 1863. From 1863, the Asotin area was officially opened to settlers. In 1868, Peter "Jerry" Maguire homesteaded along the creek about 3 miles (4.8 km) upstream from the mouth, and started a large packing business that serviced nearby mining camps. Over the next few years, more settlers moved to the area. Although the area was no longer part of the reservation, some Nez Perce continued to graze their horses and hunt there, and initial relations between the Nez Perce and settlers were friendly.

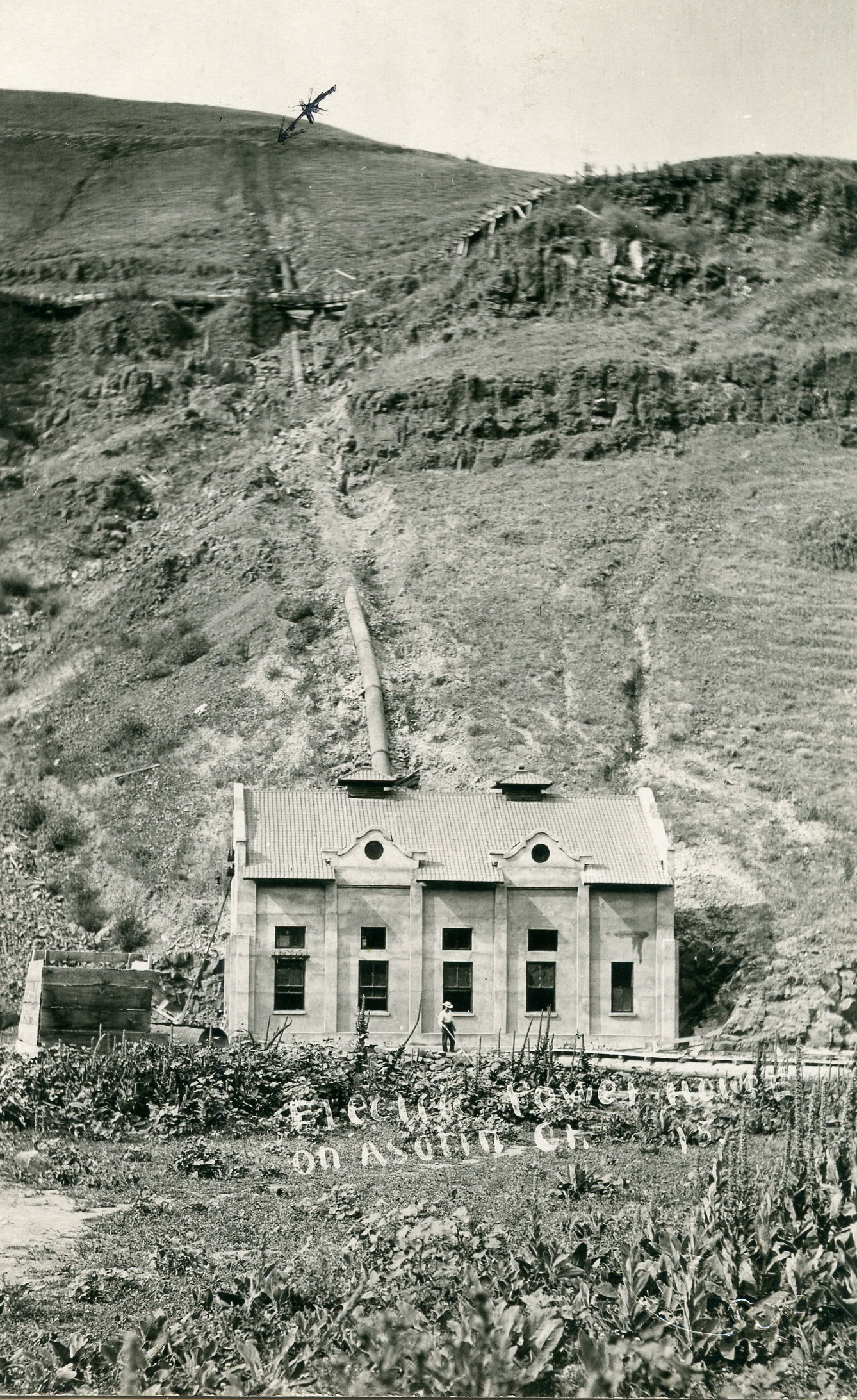
The hydroelectric powerhouse on Asotin Creek, c. 1910

In the 1870s the federal government moved to force the remaining Nez Perce into Idaho, and the resistance led by Chief Joseph resulted in the Nez Perce War. The Alpowai band and the younger Looking Glass allied with Chief Joseph. Settlers in the Asotin area panicked, and anticipating violence, a number of homesteads were converted into forts. In 1877, the US army drove the rebelling Nez Perce from the area in what is now remembered as the "Flight of the Nez Perce". The following year, the towns of "Assotin City" and "Asotin" were platted at the mouth of the creek, and attracted more settlers to the area. As the population grew, Asotin County was formed in 1883, and in 1886 the two settlements merged to form the single city of Asotin.

The first proposal for diverting water from Asotin Creek came in 1863 when a Lewiston entrepreneur named Gillman proposed an irrigation canal leading from upper Asotin Creek into Jawbone Flat, the dry plateau southwest of what is now Clarkston bordered by Asotin Creek and the Snake River. However, he was unable to raise the capital required for the project. It was not until July 1896 that the canal was completed by the Lewiston Water and Power Company at a cost of $300,000. The 18-mile (29 km) long canal was designed to irrigate 6,000 acres (2,400 ha) and provide municipal water to the fledgling settlement of Concord, which in 1898 became Clarkston. By 1903 the population of the Clarkston area had increased from a tiny settlement of 15 people to more than 2,200. By the 1930s large areas around Asotin and Clarkston had been developed for orchards, while the dry prairies were plowed for wheat.

In 1906 the Washington Water Power Company built a diversion dam and hydroelectric plant on Asotin Creek. Water was diverted from Asotin Creek through a 7-mile (11 km) long wooden pipeline to a 3000-horsepower generating station located just above the creek's mouth. The outflow was then channeled to a second, smaller powerhouse above Clarkston. In addition to a small steam plant in Lewiston, the Asotin hydroelectric system met the early power needs of the whole region spanning from Lewiston, Clarkston, Asotin, Genesee and Moscow. The hydroelectric system was abandoned sometime before 1935, when it was noted that "no water has been diverted for power for many years", but the pipeline was still being used for water supply. The disused Asotin generating station still exists today and is located about 1 mile (1.6 km) upstream of Asotin.

The intensity of livestock use was increased in the early 1900s with about 3,000 cattle grazing in the lower elevations of the watershed from spring through fall, and about 30,000 sheep in the higher elevations (primarily national forest lands) during summer. There were also large herds of wild horses, but after a 1901 epidemic killed thousands of them, the remainder were rounded up and there have been no wild herds since about 1910. The Forest Service began regulating grazing in 1929, establishing a large range area known as the Asotin allotment. Sheep ranching eventually declined, and ended on Umatilla National Forest lands after 1952.

The upper Asotin Creek watershed was logged intensively from the 1930s to the 1950s, with almost all the accessible timber harvested multiple times.

== Ecology ==
The Asotin Creek Wildlife Area, managed by the Washington Department of Fish and Wildlife (WDFW), includes about 36,500 acres (14,800 ha) of shrub-steppe grassland and dry coniferous forest, providing habitat for deer, elk, wild turkey, quail, chukar and grouse. The wildlife area is divided into three units, with the Asotin Creek and Weatherly units along the upper Asotin and Charles Creeks, and the separate George Creek Unit further east along the George Creek tributary. Due to hunting and habitat loss, Rocky Mountain elk were considered functionally extinct in the Blue Mountains until they were reintroduced in the 1920s. In the mid-1990s the Asotin Creek watershed provided winter range for about 1,100 head.

Asotin Creek historically supported several anadromous fish species, including summer steelhead, spring and fall chinook salmon, bull trout, and Pacific lamprey. The populations in Asotin Creek have been impacted by irrigation diversions, livestock grazing, and agricultural runoff. In 1937 the U.S. Fish and Wildlife Service reported that while the creek still had a large spring steelhead run, the salmon run was almost entirely gone. The North Fork of Asotin Creek had the best remaining steelhead spawning habitat. Thirteen irrigation diversions and two permanent dams formed substantial barriers to anadromous fish, especially during dry conditions when parts of the creek were completely dewatered by irrigation use. Anadromous fish returns dropped even more in the mid-20th century with the construction of dams on the Snake and lower Columbia Rivers. Bull trout were believed to be extirpated in the Asotin basin until a 1996 survey found spawners in the North Fork. Large numbers of hatchery steelhead were released in the mouth of Asotin Creek until 1998, when WDFW designated the Asotin watershed as a wild steelhead refuge.

Since 1995, the creek has been managed under the Asotin Creek Model Watershed Plan, a cooperative effort including the Asotin County Conservation District, WDFW, and local landowners and funded by the Bonneville Power Administration, to restore and enhance habitat for steelhead and salmon spawning. Habitat conservation work has included the restoration of 315 acres (127 ha) of riparian habitat, and fencing along 16 miles (26 km) of critical waterways to prevent damage from grazing cattle.

== See also ==
- List of rivers of Washington (state)
