= Lewis–Clark Valley murders =

Series of murders

- Other name: "Snake River Killer"

Details
- Victims: 5+
- Span of crimes: 1979–1982
- Country: United States
- States: Washington, Idaho

The Lewis–Clark Valley murders refer to a cluster of unsolved murders and disappearances that occurred in the Lewiston-Clarkston metropolitan area of northern Idaho between 1979 and 1982. Law enforcement investigators have identified four victims and possibly a fifth that are connected to a single suspect.

== Victims ==
=== Christina White ===
External image
- Age progression of White to 52

Christina Lee White, 12, was last seen in Asotin, Washington, on April 28, 1979, which was also the day of the Asotin County Fair Parade. There are conflicting accounts of what happened that day and when Christina was last seen. At the time she disappeared, in 1979, the first reporting stated Christina had disappeared from the Asotin County Fairgrounds. These reports, some from school friends of Christina, indicated she had last been seen later in the evening around 7 pm or 8 pm and some placed her at the Fair as late as 10:30 pm that she was on her way home at that time.

Christina's mother Betty, reported that Christina had called her at around 2 pm from a friend's house to report feeling ill. In the days following Christina's disappearance, Betty recalled that she and Christina had planned to meet at a prearranged meeting place downtown in Asotin during that phone call, but when Betty arrived Christina was not there. In later years, Betty stated that she told Christina to walk home and that she would watch for Christina to arrive at an intersection down the street from their home. In both versions, according to Betty, Christina never arrived and Betty assumed she had gotten better and returned to the fair.

Although initial reporting placed Christina at the Fairgrounds between 7 pm and 10:30 pm, at some point in later years the investigation shifted to a belief that Christina had disappeared from the friend's house where she had placed the call to her mother. This shift seems to coincide in time with the discovery by law enforcement that the house where Christina made the phone call to her mother the day she disappeared was owned by the girlfriend, later wife, of the man who was present at the Lewiston Civic Theater the night Steven Pearsall, Kristina Nelson, and Jacqueline Miller disappeared in 1982.

Christina's schoolwork was discovered in pieces at a field outside of Asotin a few weeks after she vanished. Christina was also last seen riding her white ten-speed bicycle at the time of her disappearance. It has never been located.

=== Kristin David ===
Senior student at the University of Idaho, Kristin Noel David, 22, was last seen on a bicycle on June 26, 1981, while travelling from Moscow, Idaho, south on U.S. Highway 95 to Lewiston, Idaho. David's dismembered remains were first found on July 4, 1981, six miles west of Clarkston, Washington, and just west of Silcott Island, in and along the Snake River. The following day, some, but not all, of the bones were discovered somewhere down the river. The body parts were wrapped in pages from several local newspaper editions from April 1981, and the remains were hidden inside black plastic bags. Clothing, other personal belongings, and David's blue 10-speed bicycle were never found.

Several people who were travelling on Highway 95 the day David vanished claimed to have seen a woman who matched David's description being approached by a man in a brown vehicle on the west, or southbound, side of the road just outside Genesee, Idaho. According to additional eyewitnesses, the same man approached or interacted with various female cyclists and pedestrians on Highway 95 the same day.

=== Lewiston Civic Theater incident ===
Kristina Diane Nelson, 21, and her stepsister Jacqueline Ann Miller, 18, disappeared while walking from Nelson's apartment to a grocery store in downtown Lewiston, Idaho on September 12, 1982. On the same night, Steven Pearsall, 35, went missing from the Lewiston Civic Theater. He asked his friends to drop him off so he could do some laundry washing and clarinet practice. He worked there as a janitor. He has not been seen or heard from since.

Uncharacteristically for Pearsall, he left his clarinet at the theatre. He also left an uncashed paycheck at his apartment and his car parked at a friend's house. Pearsall was well known to both women and had a "big brother"-like relationship with them. They only lived a few blocks away from his apartment, and on their way to the store, they would have passed the theatre and may have even gone inside. Nelson had worked as a janitor at the theatre before quitting, and Pearsall took her position. Pearsall and Nelson had also both attended Lewis-Clark State College.

The remains of Nelson and Miller were found March 19, 1984, in a rural area 35 miles from Lewiston near Kendrick, Idaho. Investigators were unable to determine a cause of death for Nelson, but determined that Miller had been murdered. Pearsall was never located. Investigators initially suspected Pearsall may have been involved in the Nelson-Miller abduction and murders, but later stated that all three had probably been in or near the theater at the time they vanished and were likely victims of the same killer. Authorities believe it is possible Pearsall was killed after witnessing their murders.

== Suspects and investigation ==
In 1984, Idaho State Police stated that serial killer Ottis Toole had "implicated himself" in the murder of David and was their "strongest suspect", but added that two other men had also confessed to the same crime. In 2009, a retired Lewiston police detective who had also interviewed Toole stated that he had ruled him out as a suspect. In 1995, Lewiston police announced that Nelson, Miller, and Pearsall may have been murdered together inside the Lewiston Civic Theater by another theater employee named Lance Voss. The suspect, who was present at the theater the night of the trio's disappearance, had also lived in a house that was in between Christina and Rose's home which was vacant at the time that White disappeared in 1979.

In 1998, authorities from Spokane, Washington who were investigating the killings that would later be attributed to Robert Lee Yates interviewed this same suspect. In 1998, Lewiston police stated their belief that Kristin David's murder was linked with the other Lewiston-area murders and disappearances. A 2009 news report stated that David had worked for a time at the Lewiston Civic Theater and may have known the same theater employee suspected in the Nelson-Miller-Pearsall case. In 2011, a 53-minute documentary examining the case, Confluence, was released which identified the then-unnamed suspect.

In 2018, a two-part television documentary series examining the case, Cold Valley, aired on the Investigation Discovery network.

An Asotin County police detective who appeared on the program reaffirmed the links police had made earlier between the White and Pearsall disappearances and murders of Nelson and Miller, stating they were likely the work of the same killer. The program also linked the suspect with three other cases in and outside the region, including an unsolved Chicago murder from 1963.

This case is discussed in detail in the Snake River Killer podcast.

== See also ==
- List of fugitives from justice who disappeared
- List of solved missing person cases (post-2000)
- List of unsolved murders (1980–1999)
