= KAUC =

KAUC may refer to:

- KAUC (FM), a radio station (89.7 FM) licensed to serve West Clarkston, Washington, United States
- KWBA-TV, a television station (channel 58) licensed to serve Tucson, Arizona, United States, which held the call sign KAUC in 1997
