= Robert Bracken =

Robert Bracken may refer to:

- Bob Bracken (American football) (1885−1965), American college football player
- Bob Bracken (settler) (c. 1841−1906), American settler and rancher
