= C. C. Van Arsdol House =

- U.S. National Register of Historic Places
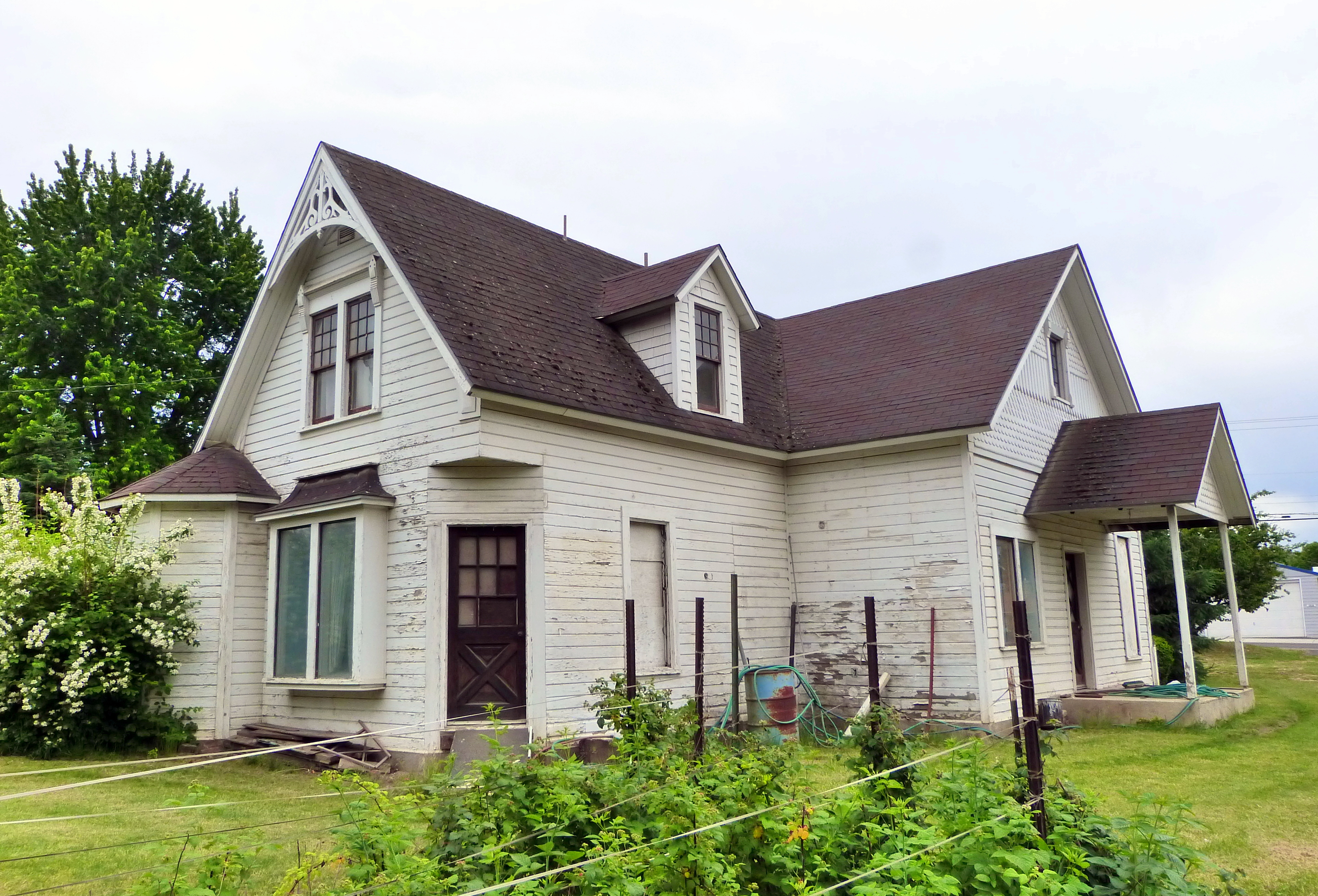

- Location within Washington (state) Location within the United States
- Location: 1011 15th Street, Clarkston, Washington
- Coordinates: 46°24′38″N 117°04′07″W
- Area: less than one acre
- Built: 1882
- NRHP reference No.: 75001839
- Added to NRHP: May 6, 1975

The C. C. Van Arsdol House, at 1011 15th Street in Clarkston in Asotin County, Washington, was built in 1882. It was listed on the National Register of Historic Places in 1975.

The house "is a complex assembly of additions built onto a small one-story, one room homesteader's cottage dating from the early 1880s." It was a home of civil engineer Cassius C. Van Arsdol.
