= Alpowa Creek =

- Location of the mouth of Alpowa Creek in Washington

Location
- Country: United States
- State: Washington
- County: Garfield, Asotin

Physical characteristics
- Source: Blue Mountains
  - location: near Peola
  - coordinates: 46°17′49″N 117°29′37″W
- Mouth: Snake River
  - location: West of Lewiston/Clarkston
  - coordinates: 46°25′16″N 117°12′15″W
  - elevation: 738 ft (225 m)
- Length: 25.1 mi (40.4 km)

Basin features
- Tributaries
  - right: Page Creek

Alpowa Creek is a stream in Garfield and Asotin Counties, southeastern Washington. It starts near Peola, about 10 miles (16 km) south of Pomeroy, in the foothills of the northern Blue Mountains just outside the Umatilla National Forest. It initially flows north through farmland before descending northeast into a canyon, flanked to the north by Alpowa Ridge and to the south by Knotgrass Ridge. It receives Stember Creek from the left; downstream of there, U.S. Highway 12 runs parallel to it. It empties into the Snake River at Lower Granite Lake, the impoundment formed by Lower Granite Dam, about 8 miles (13 km) to the west of Clarkston.

The creek's name derives from the Nez Perce Alpahwah or Elpawawe meaning "a spring forming a creek", which was the name of a Nez Perce village that once stood at the confluence of Alpowa Creek and the Snake River. The creek supports a minor population of Snake River steelhead trout. Due to the impacts of livestock grazing and water diversion for agriculture, it has been designated a priority restoration reach by the Snake River Salmon Recovery Board.

== See also ==
- List of rivers of Washington
- Indian Timothy Memorial Bridge
