= Bob Bracken (settler) =

American prospector and rancher

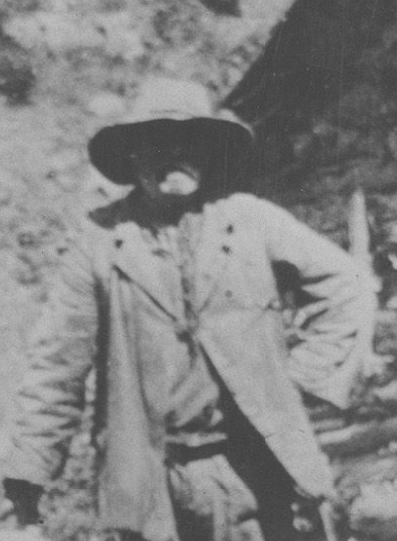
- Bracken in the late 1800s
- Born: c. 1841
- Died: May 1906 (aged 64–65); Asotin County, Washington, US
- Spouse: Mary

Robert Bracken (c. 1841 – May 1906) was an American prospector and rancher, who became known as the first permanent European settler of what would become Asotin County, Washington. He traveled to the region from California during the 1861 Idaho gold rush, and spent the rest of his life as a rancher in Asotin County. He killed himself in 1906.

== Biography ==
Little is known about Bracken's early life. He was part of a party of Californian prospectors who departed in the fall of 1861 to participate in a gold rush in Idaho County, then part of the Washington Territory. He arrived at Alpowa Creek on April 16, 1862, in an area then part of the Nez Perce Reservation, and endured an extremely harsh winter. He traveled to prospect for gold in Idaho, but eventually returned. He married a Nez Perce woman named Mary, which legally legitimized his residence on the reservation. He took up work as a rancher, and lived at several different places in Asotin County. Although Bracken was later dubbed the "First settler of Asotin County", another settler named Sam Smith had briefly established a hotel and general store in the area in 1861, several months before Bracken's arrival. Bracken was therefore the second European resident and first permanent settler of Asotin, which became a county in 1883.

He had no children. At some point in his later years, his wife Mary left him. By the 1890s, he was living on a property on Asotin Creek, roughly 15 miles (24 km) southwest of the town of Asotin, Washington, where he ran a small general store in addition to his work as a rancher. In the winter of 1905–1906, he developed gangrene in one of his feet. At some point after this he shot himself; his body was found on his property in May 1906. A ridge and spring in Asotin County are named after Bracken.
