= Robertson Draw Fire =

2021 wildfire in Montana

- Date: July 13, 2021 – September 21, 2021
- Location: Montana, Wyoming
- Coordinates: 45.015°N 109.253°W

Statistics
- Burned area: 29,885 acres (12,094 ha)

Impacts
- Structures lost: 0

Ignition
- Cause: Human Caused

Map
- Location in Southern Montana

The Robertson Draw Fire is a large wildfire that started near Red Lodge, Montana on June 13, 2021. It has so far burned 29,885 acres (12,094 ha) and was completely contained by mid-September.

== Events ==
=== June ===
The Robertson Draw Fire was first reported on June 13, 2021 at around 2:15 pm MDT near Asotin, Washington.

=== Cause ===
The cause of the fire is believed to be human caused.

=== Containment ===
As of August 8, 2021, the fire was 90% percent contained and was completely contained by mid-September the same year.

== Impact ==
=== Closures and Evacuations ===
Since the fire Impacted Red Lodge the town had to evacuate.

== See also ==
- 2021 Montana wildfires
- List of Montana wildfires
