= Indian Timothy Memorial Bridge =

- U.S. National Register of Historic Places
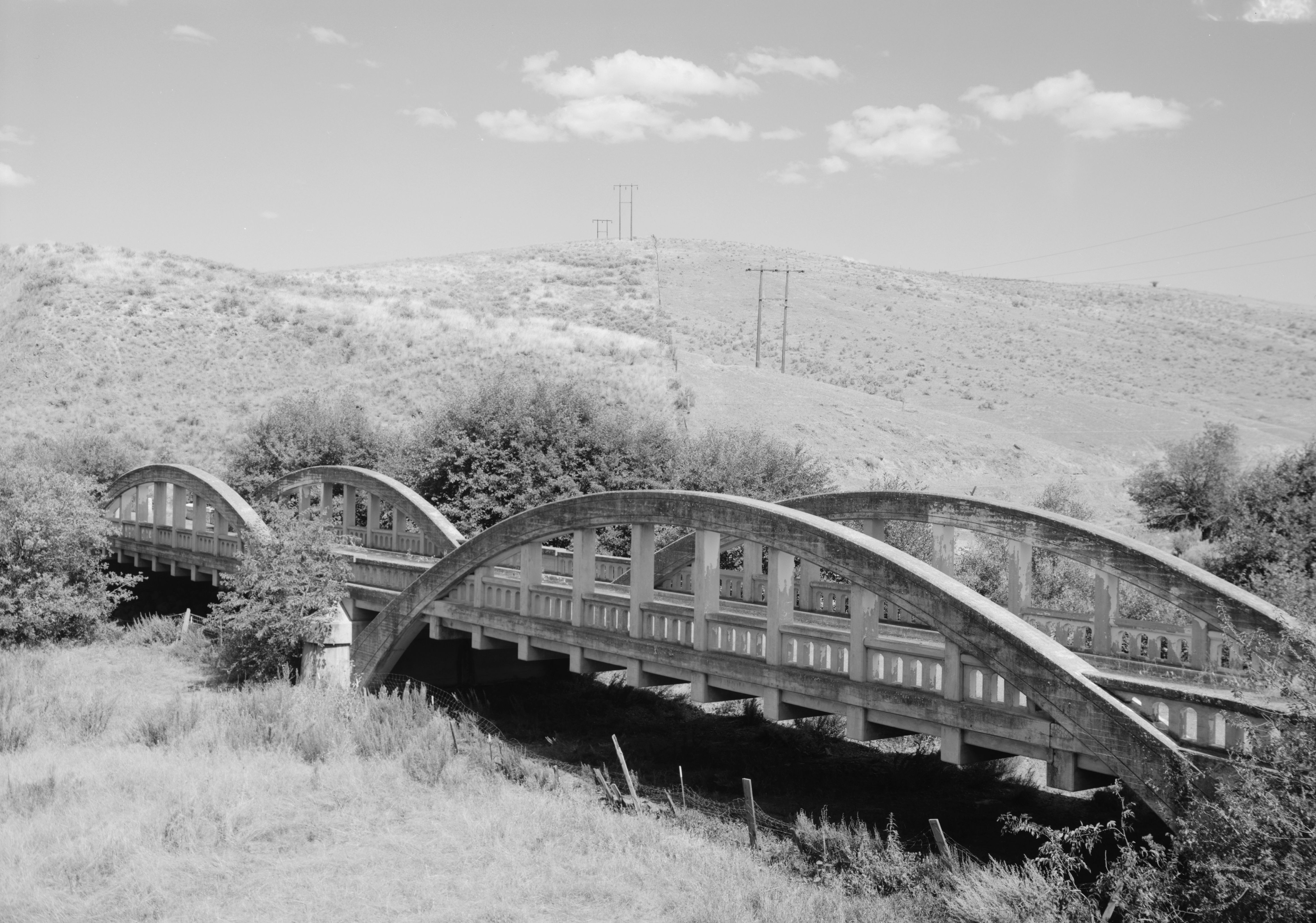
- HAER photo from 1993

- Location within Washington (state) Location within the United States
- Location: Spans Alpowa Creek, about 8 miles (13 km) west of Clarkston
- Nearest city: Clarkston, Washington
- Coordinates: 46.411930°N 117.213301°W
- Area: Less than one acre
- Built: 1923
- Built by: Washington State Department of Transportation
- Architectural style: tied-arch bridge
- MPS: Historic Bridges/Tunnels in Washington State TR
- NRHP reference No.: 82004194
- Added to NRHP: July 16, 1982

The Indian Timothy Memorial Bridge is a tied-arch bridge which spans Alpowa Creek less than half a mile before that creek joins the Snake River, about 8 miles (13 km) west of Clarkston in Asotin County, Washington. It was built by the Washington State Department of Transportation in 1923 and was listed on the National Register of Historic Places in 1982.

It is the only two-span tied arch bridge in the state, and one of only five concrete tied arch bridges. It has two 100-foot (30 m) arches, each of which has 20 feet (6.1 m) rise.

It is named for Ta-moot-Tsoo (Chief Timothy), a Nez Perce Indian who lived from 1800–1891, who was "a true friend of the early settlers of Washington, Oregon, and Idaho." Chief Timothy Park is located on Silcott Island in the Snake River, close to the mouth of Alpowa Creek.

The bridge was bypassed when what is now U.S. Route 12 was widened to four lanes in the 1970s, and stands roughly parallel to the new bridge, about 100 feet (30 m) apart.

The bridge was documented by the Historic American Engineering Record in 1993, with photography by Jet Lowe.

== See also ==
- List of bridges on the National Register of Historic Places in Washington (state)
- List of bridges documented by the Historic American Engineering Record in Washington (state)
