= Lewiston–Clarkston metropolitan area =

- Metropolitan Statistical Area
- Lewiston, ID–WA Metropolitan Statistical Area
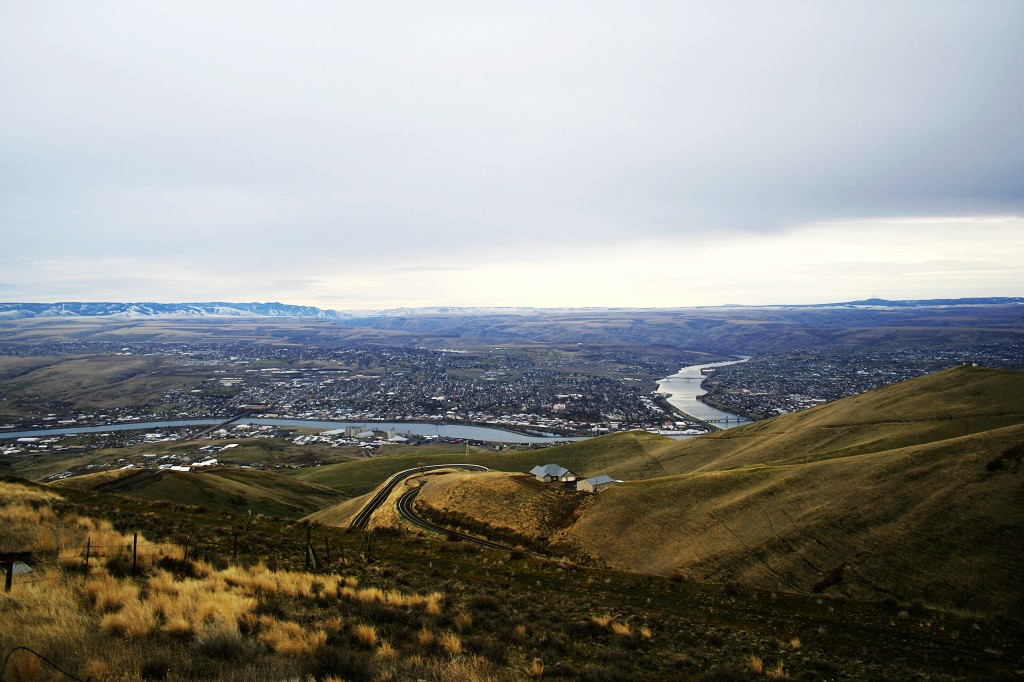
- Lewiston from the north (2006)
Map of Lewiston, ID–WA MSA
City of Lewiston, ID
City of Clarkston, WA
Lewiston, ID–WA MSA
- Coordinates: 46°N 117°W
- Country: United States
- State: Idaho; Washington
- Largest city: Lewiston, ID (32,873)
- Other cities: Clarkston, WA (7,341)

Area
  - Total: 1,497 sq mi (3,880 km^{2})

Population
  - Total: 62,675
  - Rank: 380th in the U.S.
  - Density: 43/sq mi (16.6/km^{2})
- Time zone: UTC-8 (PST)
  - Summer (DST): UTC-7 (PDT)

The Lewiston–Clarkston metropolitan area—colloquially referred to as the Lewiston–Clarkston Valley or Lewis–Clark Valley (often abbreviated as LC Valley), and officially known as the Lewiston, ID–WA Metropolitan Statistical Area—is a metropolitan area comprising Nez Perce County, Idaho, and Asotin County, Washington. The metro is anchored by the cities of Lewiston, Idaho, and Clarkston, Washington—named after Meriwether Lewis and William Clark, (Note: of the Lewis and Clark Expedition) respectively. As of the 2010 census, the MSA had a population of 60,888 (though a July 1, 2011 estimate placed the population at 61,476), making it the 4th smallest metropolitan area in the United States.

== Geography ==
=== Counties ===
- Nez Perce County, Idaho
- Asotin County, Washington

=== Communities ===
- Anatone, Washington (unincorporated)
- Asotin, Washington
- Clarkston Heights-Vineland, Washington (unincorporated)
- Clarkston, Washington
- Culdesac, Idaho
- Lapwai, Idaho
- Lewiston, Idaho (Principal city)
- Peck, Idaho
- Spalding, Idaho (unincorporated)
- West Clarkston-Highland, Washington (unincorporated)

=== Features ===
- Lewiston Hill
- Lower Granite Lake
- Snake River
- Clearwater River (Idaho)
- Bridges
  - Interstate Highway Bridge
  - Southway Bridge
  - Clearwater Memorial Bridge
  - Red Wolf Crossing
- Highways
  - U.S. Route 12
  - U.S. Route 95
  - U.S. Route 195
  - Idaho State Highway 3
  - Idaho State Highway 128
  - Washington State Route 128
  - Washington State Route 129

== Photos ==
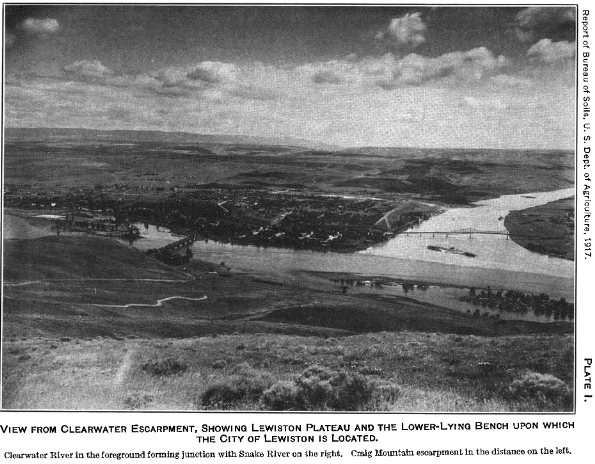

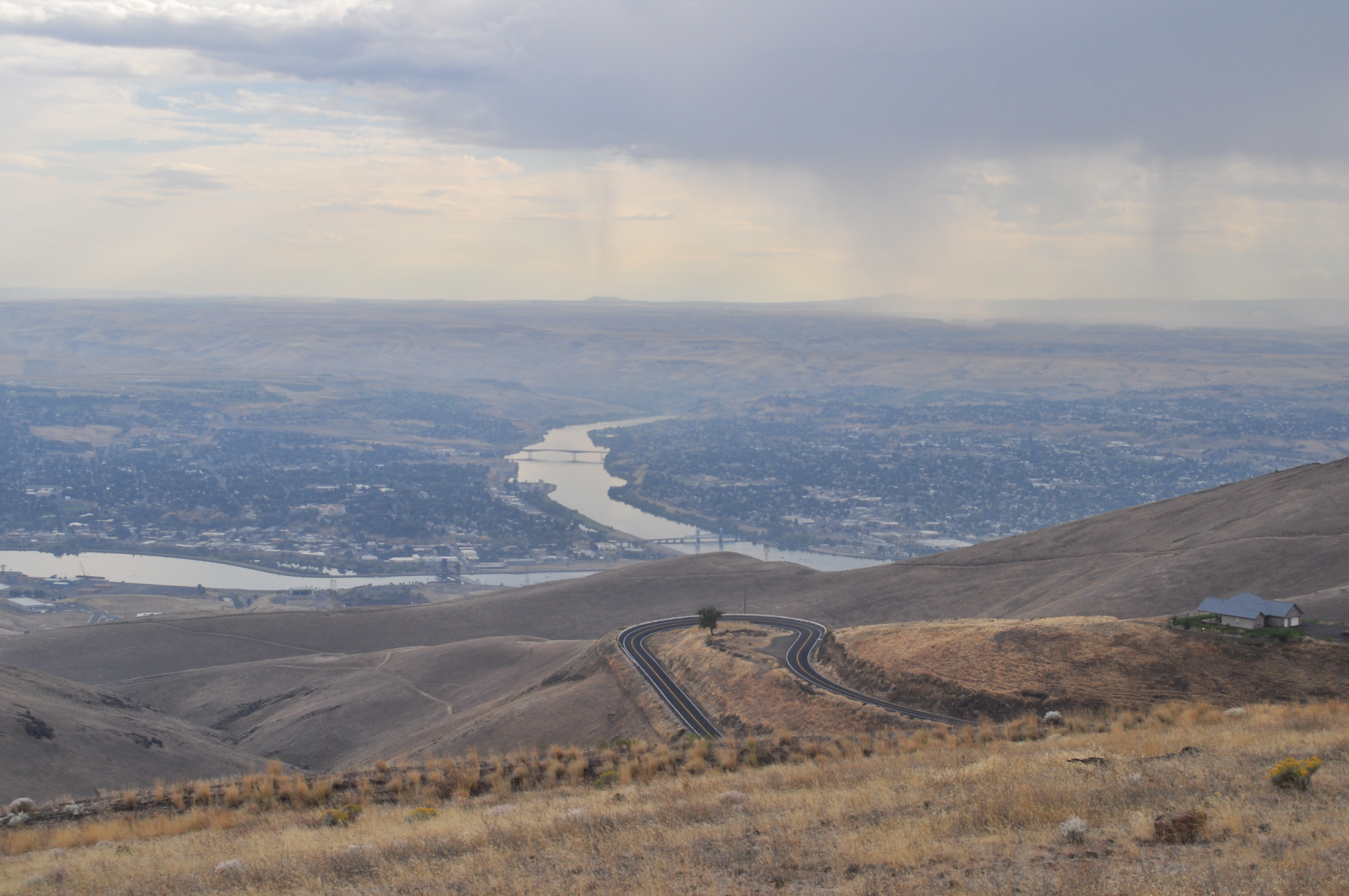

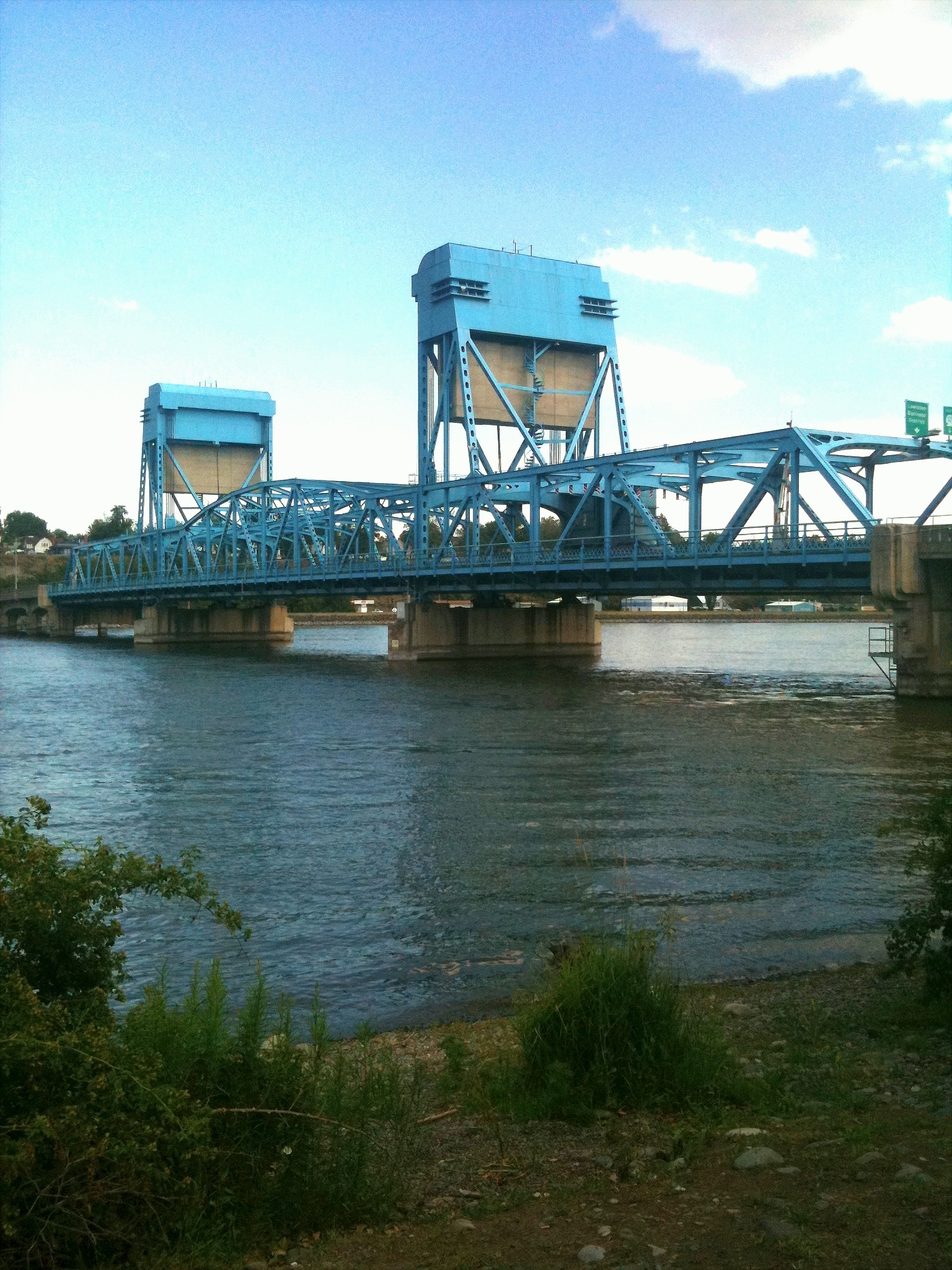

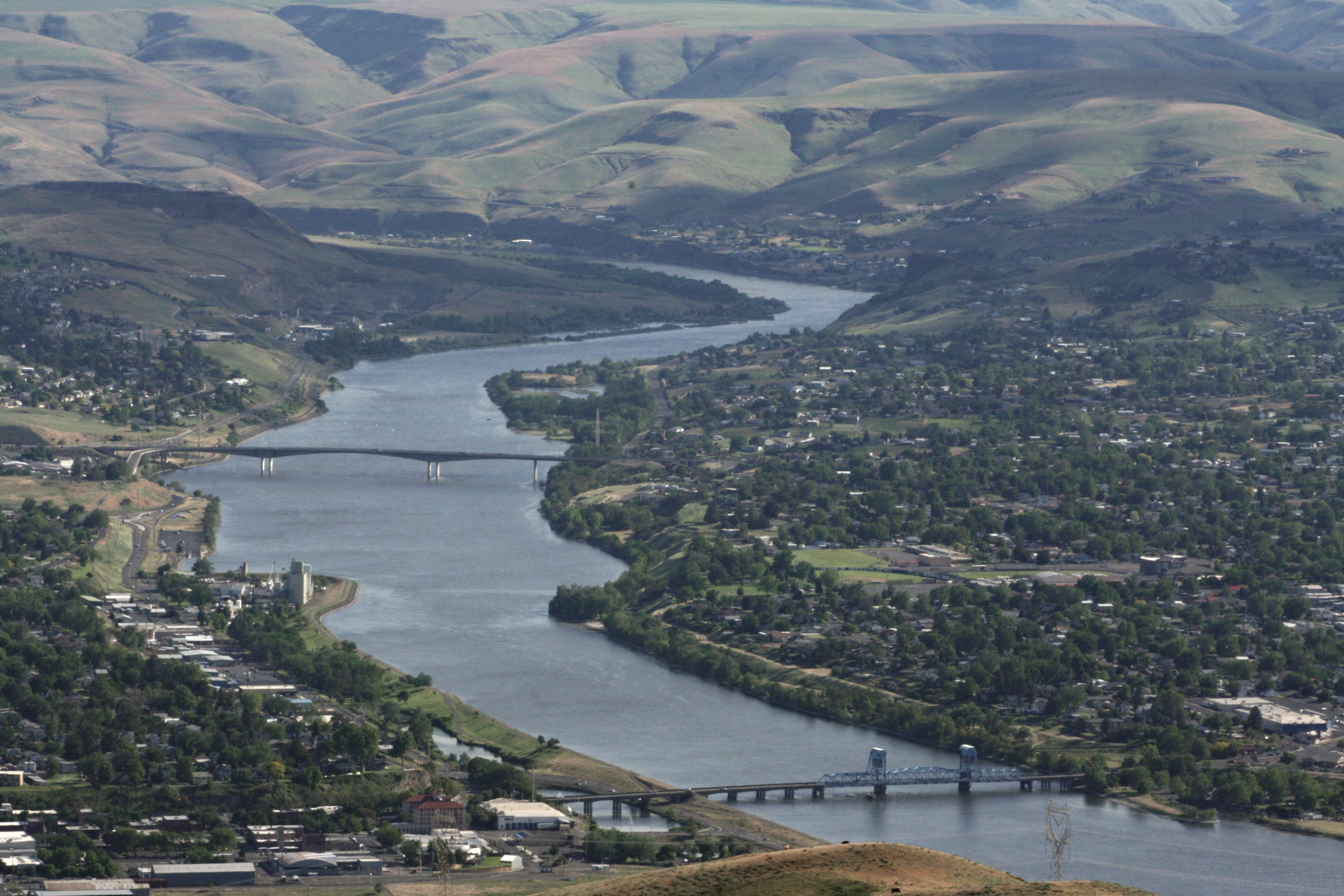

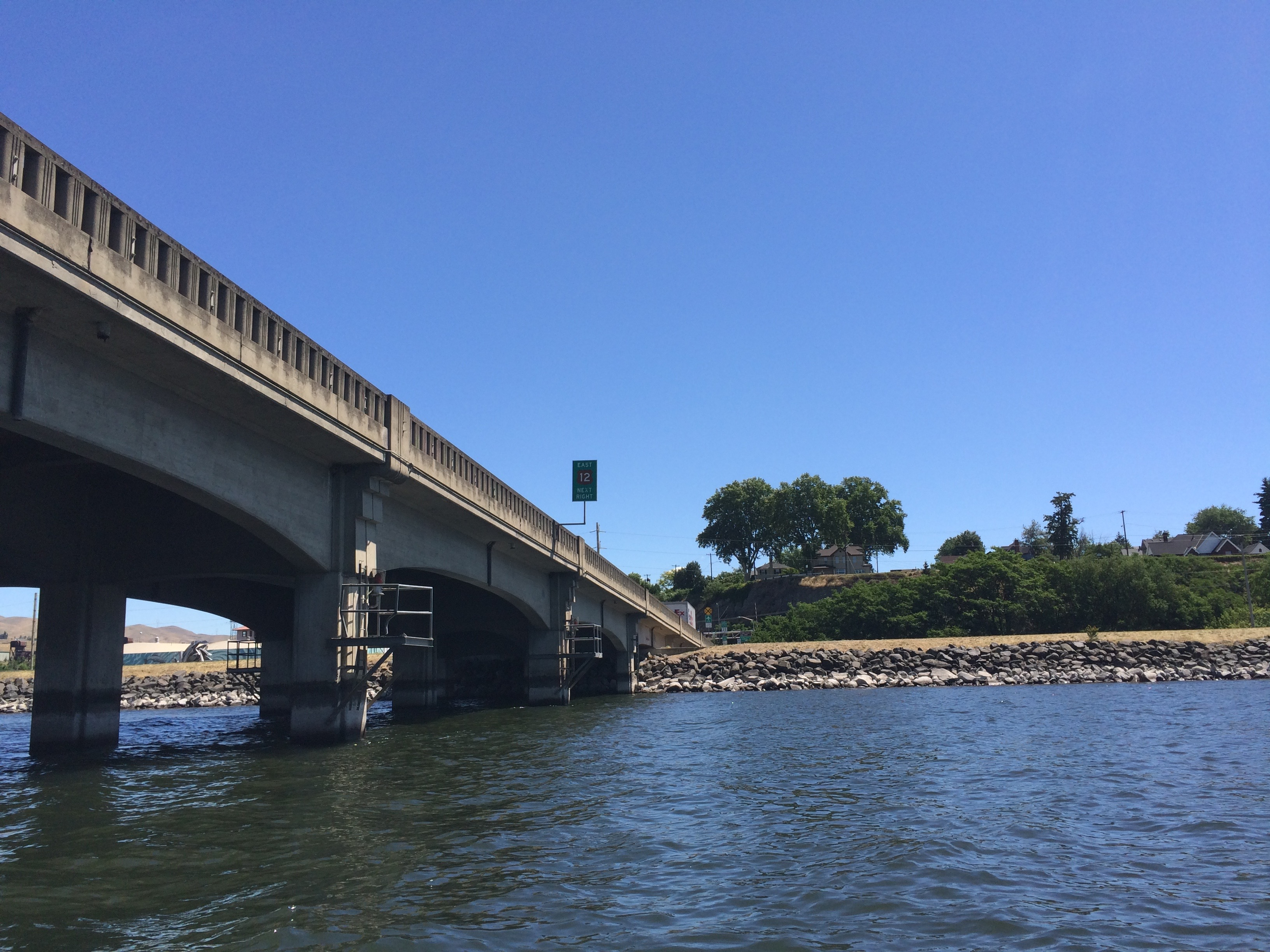
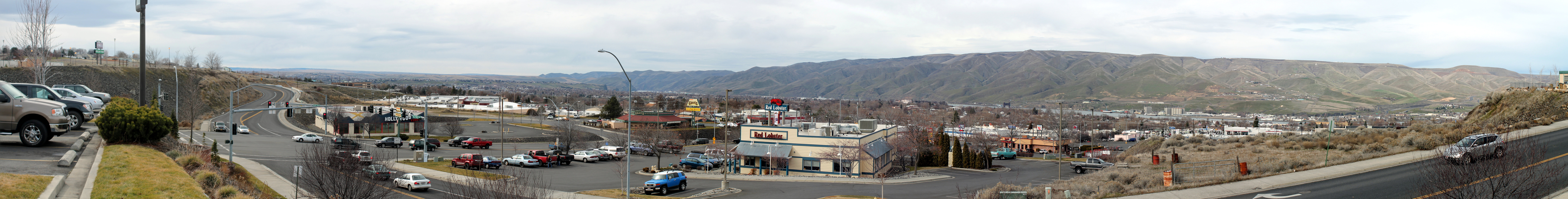
The Lewiston–Clarkston metropolitan area in February 2013, as seen from the "Thain Grade"

== Demographics ==
As of the census of 2000, there were 57,961 people, 23,650 households, and 15,803 families residing within the MSA. The racial makeup of the MSA was 93.01% White, 0.25% African American, 3.88% Native American, 0.60% Asian, 0.06% Pacific Islander, 0.55% from other races, and 1.66% from two or more races. Hispanic or Latino of any race were 1.94% of the population.

The median income for a household in the MSA was $34,903, and the median income for a family was $42,402. Males had a median income of $35,249 versus $24,616 for females. The per capita income for the MSA was $18,146.

== See also ==
- Lewis–Clark Valley murders
- Idaho census statistical areas
- Washington census statistical areas
