= Silcott, Washington =

Unincorporated community in Washington, United States

- Ghost town
- Location within Washington (state)
- Coordinates: 46°24′56″N 117°11′52″W
- Country: United States
- State: Washington
- County: Asotin
- Elevation: 738 ft (225 m)
- Time zone: UTC-8 (Pacific (PST))
  - Summer (DST): UTC-7 (PDT)
- ZIP Code: 99403
- Area code: 509
- GNIS feature ID: 1533427

Silcott is an unincorporated community and ghost town in Asotin County, in the U.S. state of Washington. The community is located on the south bank of the Snake River and U.S. Route 12 passes through the community. Much of the townsite was inundated when Lower Granite Lake filled on the Snake River behind Lower Granite Dam in 1975.

== History ==
The area that became Silcott was inhabited by the Nez Perce since before recorded history. Lewis and Clark camped in the area during their expedition in 1805 and interacted with the native peoples. In 1837 the first orchard in the Snake River valley was planted in Silcott. The community was initially settled by white people in the mid-1800s and served as a river crossing with a mill and warehouses. In the late 1800s the community was badly damaged in a fire.

A post office called Silcott was established in 1883, and remained in operation until 1931. The community was named after John Silcott, an early settler.

Much of the former townsite was flooded when Lower Granite Lake filled behind Lower Granite Dam in the 1970s.
