= Clarkston Heights-Vineland, Washington =

- CDP
- Location of Clarkston Heights-Vineland, Washington
- Coordinates: 46°22′30″N 117°07′20″W
- Country: United States
- State: Washington
- County: Asotin

Area
  - Total: 5.9 sq mi (15.4 km^{2})
  - Land: 5.9 sq mi (15.4 km^{2})
  - Water: 0 sq mi (0.0 km^{2})
- Elevation: 1,201 ft (366 m)

Population (2020)
  - Total: 7,275
  - Density: 1,027/sq mi (396.7/km^{2})
- Time zone: UTC-8 (Pacific (PST))
  - Summer (DST): UTC-7 (PDT)
- ZIP code: 99403
- Area code: 509
- FIPS code: 53-12680
- GNIS feature ID: 2407628

Clarkston Heights-Vineland is a census-designated place (CDP) in Asotin County, Washington, United States. It is part of the Lewiston, ID–WA Metropolitan Statistical Area. The population was 7,275 at the 2020 census.

== Geography ==
According to the United States Census Bureau, the CDP has a total area of 5.9 square miles (15.4 km^{2}), all of it land.

== Demographics ==
Historical Population
Census	Pop.	Note	%±
2000	6,117		—
2010	6,323		3.4%
2020	7,275		15.1%
U.S. Decennial Census; 1970 1980 1990; 2000 2010

As of the census of 2000, there were 6,117 people, 2,329 households, and 1,811 families residing in the CDP. The population density was 1,027.3 inhabitants per square mile (396.6/km^{2}). There were 2,438 housing units at an average density of 409.5 per square mile (158.1/km^{2}). The racial makeup of the CDP was 97.09% White, 0.05% African American, 0.90% Native American, 0.31% Asian, 0.03% Pacific Islander, 0.43% from other races, and 1.19% from two or more races. Hispanic or Latino of any race were 1.47% of the population.

There were 2,329 households, out of which 33.4% had children under the age of 18 living with them, 68.4% were married couples living together, 6.0% had a female householder with no husband present, and 22.2% were non-families. 18.8% of all households were made up of individuals, and 8.9% had someone living alone who was 65 years of age or older. The average household size was 2.61 and the average family size was 2.96.

In the CDP, the age distribution of the population shows 26.4% under the age of 18, 5.8% from 18 to 24, 26.3% from 25 to 44, 27.3% from 45 to 64, and 14.2% who were 65 years of age or older. The median age was 40 years. For every 100 females, there were 95.7 males. For every 100 females age 18 and over, there were 91.3 males.

The median income for a household in the CDP was $48,306, and the median income for a family was $54,223. Males had a median income of $40,698 versus $26,359 for females. The per capita income for the CDP was $22,540. About 4.4% of families and 6.4% of the population were below the poverty line, including 8.0% of those under age 18 and 5.5% of those age 65 or over.
