= Jesse Davis (American football) =

American football player (born 1991)

No. 77, 73, 66
- Position: Offensive tackle

Personal information
- Born: September 15, 1991 (age 35); Asotin, Washington, U.S.
- Listed height: 6 ft 6 in (1.98 m)
- Listed weight: 309 lb (140 kg)

Career information
- High school: Asotin
- College: Idaho (2011-2014)
- NFL draft: 2015: undrafted

Career history
- Seattle Seahawks (2015)*; New York Jets (2016)*; Miami Dolphins (2016–2021); Minnesota Vikings (2022)*; Pittsburgh Steelers (2022); San Francisco 49ers (2023); New Orleans Saints (2024)*
- * Offseason or practice squad member only

Career NFL statistics as of 2023
- Games played: 95
- Games started: 72
- Stats at Pro Football Reference

Jesse Davis (born September 15, 1991) is an American former professional football player who was an offensive tackle in the National Football League (NFL). He played college football for the Idaho Vandals and played in the NFL for the Miami Dolphins, Pittsburgh Steelers, and San Francisco 49ers.

== College career ==
Born and raised in Asotin in the southeast corner of Washington state, Davis was recruited as a defensive tackle by Idaho in nearby Moscow. He started twelve games for the Vandals at defensive tackle in 2012, then was moved to offensive tackle in spring camp in 2013.

== Professional career ==
Pre-draft measurables
Height	Weight	Arm length	Hand span	40-yard dash	10-yard split	20-yard split	20-yard shuttle	Three-cone drill	Vertical jump	Broad jump	Bench press
6 ft 5 7/8 in (1.98 m)	309 lb (140 kg)	33 3/4 in (0.86 m)	9 5/8 in (0.24 m)	5.28 s	1.70 s	3.02 s	4.85 s	7.41 s	30.5 in (0.77 m)	9 ft 0 in (2.74 m)	26 reps
All values from Pro Day

=== Seattle Seahawks ===
Davis signed with the Seattle Seahawks as an undrafted free agent on May 2, 2015, but was waived on August 31.

=== New York Jets ===
On January 11, 2016, Davis signed with the New York Jets, but was waived on August 28. He was signed to the Jets' practice squad on November 1, but was released two weeks later.

=== Miami Dolphins ===
On November 22, 2016, Davis was signed to the Miami Dolphins' practice squad. then signed a reserve/future contract with the team on January 10, 2017.

Davis made the Dolphins 53-man roster in 2017, and made his NFL debut at left guard in the team's season opener against the Los Angeles Chargers. He started Week 8 and 9 at left guard, then finished the season as the starting right tackle in place of the injured Ja'Wuan James.

Davis was named the starting right guard to begin the 2018 season.

On September 7, 2019, Davis signed a three-year, $15 million contract extension with the Dolphins.

Davis was placed on the reserve/COVID-19 list by the team on November 23, 2020, and activated on November 26.

Davis was released after five seasons with the Miami Dolphins on March 24, 2022.

=== Minnesota Vikings ===
On March 28, 2022, Davis signed with the Minnesota Vikings.

=== Pittsburgh Steelers ===
On August 30, 2022, Davis was traded to the Pittsburgh Steelers in exchange for a 2025 conditional seventh-round pick. He appeared in 14 games for Pittsburgh during the 2022 season.

=== San Francisco 49ers ===
On October 31, 2023, Davis signed with the San Francisco 49ers' practice squad. He made one appearance for San Francisco, playing five snaps in a Week 12 victory over the Seattle Seahawks.

=== New Orleans Saints ===
On July 28, 2024, Davis signed with the New Orleans Saints. He was released prior to the start of the season on August 27.

On June 23, 2025, Davis announced his retirement from professional football via an Instagram post.
