= Cloverland Garage =

- U.S. National Register of Historic Places
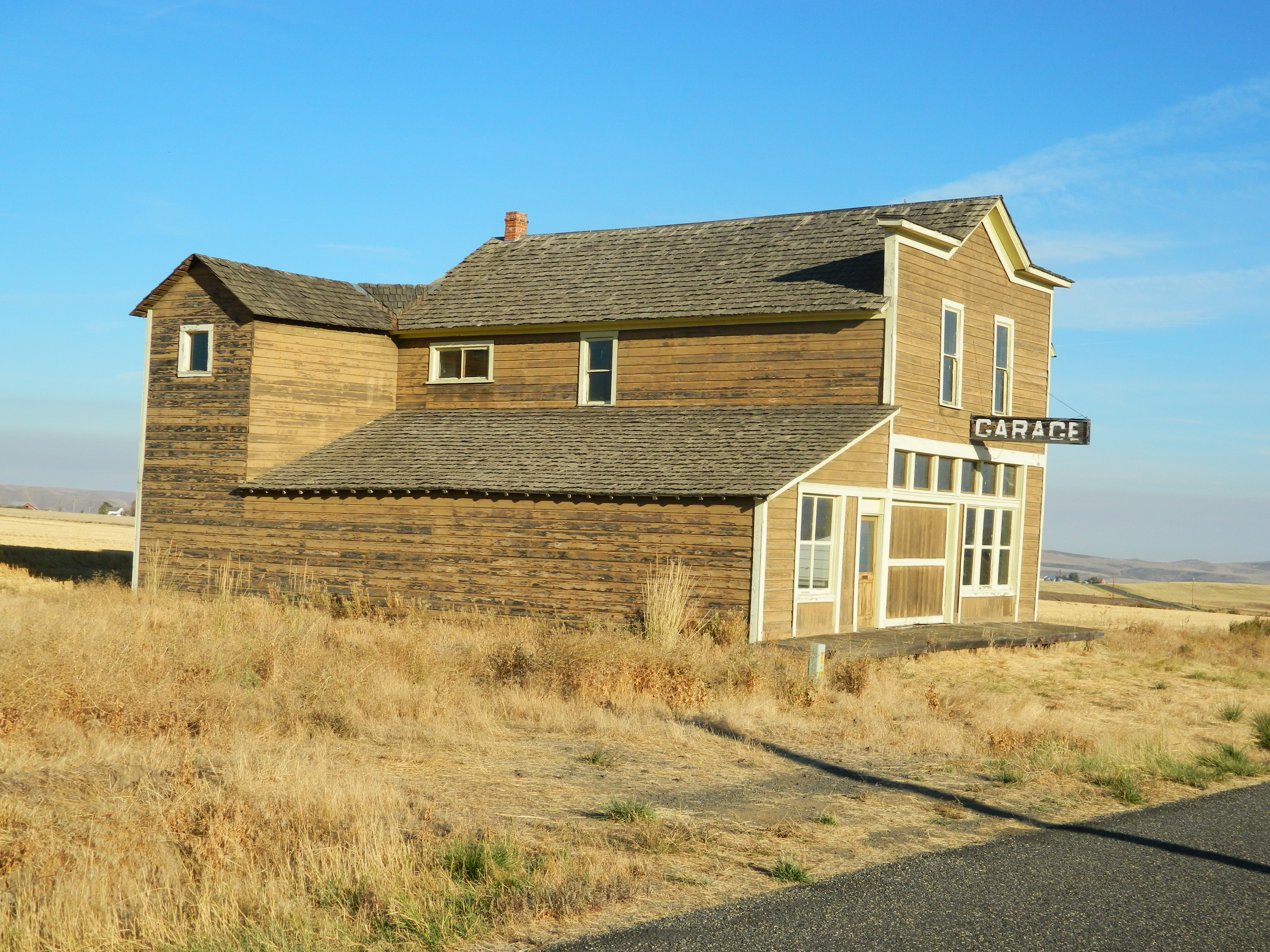

- Location within Washington (state)
- Location: Along Cloverland Road, about 0.11 miles (0.18 km) from its junction with Roupe Road, Cloverland, Washington
- Coordinates: 46°15′07″N 117°15′03″W
- Area: less than one acre
- Built: 1902
- Built by: Henry Howard; Edward H. Dammarel
- Architectural style: Early Commercial, Vernacular Commercial
- NRHP reference No.: 86000895
- Added to NRHP: May 2, 1986

The Cloverland Garage is a historic building in Cloverland, Washington. The building was built in 1902, shortly after Cloverland was platted, and originally served as a store and dance hall. The wood-frame building has a vernacular design with a false front. While it continued to serve as a store, the building became Cloverland's post office in 1903 and its first telephone exchange in 1904. In 1918, Fred W. Walter converted the building to be Cloverland's first automobile garage. The new building served as an automobile repair shop, a filling station, and a Buick and GMC dealership. After 1928, Walter moved from his apartment above the garage to a farm, and the garage offered less frequent service.

The garage was added to the National Register of Historic Places in 1986.
