= Page Creek =

Stream in Washington, U.S.

Coordinates: 46°24′13″N 117°12′28″W

Page Creek is a stream in the U.S. state of Washington. It was initially named for a man who settled here in 1871, then renamed Corrner Gulch by 1923 (when it had run dry).

== See also ==
- List of rivers of Washington (state)
