= Cloverland, Washington =

- Former community
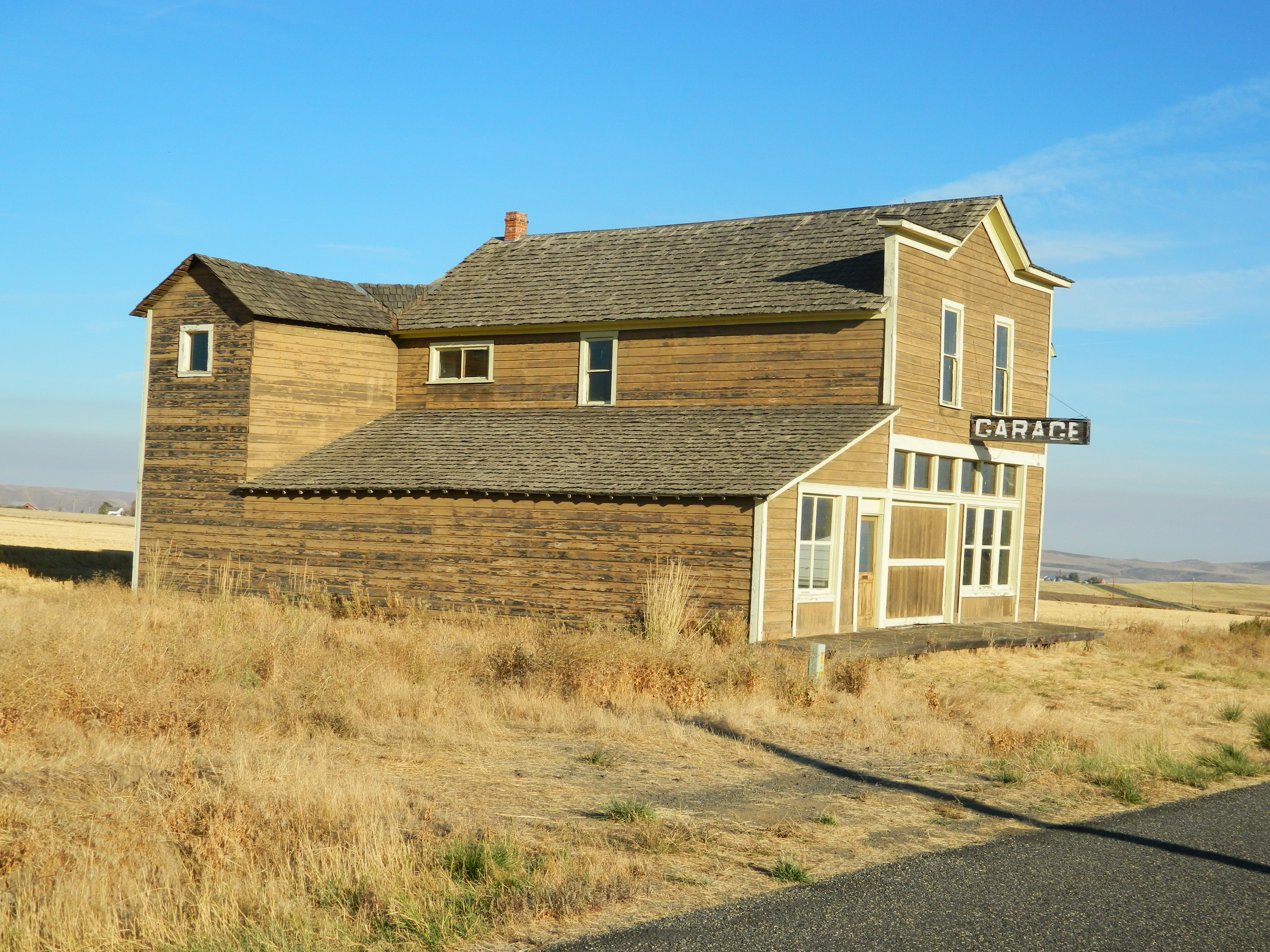
- Cloverland Garage

- Location within Washington (state)
- Coordinates: 46°15′02″N 117°15′04″W
- Country: United States
- State: Washington
- County: Asotin
- Elevation: 2,936 ft (895 m)
- Time zone: UTC-8 (Pacific (PST))
  - Summer (DST): UTC-7 (PDT)
- Area code: 509
- GNIS feature ID: 1510883

Cloverland is a former settlement in Asotin County, Washington, United States. Cloverland was 11.5 miles (18.5 km) southwest of Asotin. The community had a peak population of roughly 400 people in 1910.

The Cloverland Garage, which is listed on the National Register of Historic Places, is still standing at the former site of Cloverland.

1890	134	—
1900	245	13
1910	427	20.5%
1920	322	−15%
1930		
1940		
1950		
1960		
1970		
1980		
1990		
2000		
2010		
2020		
