= West Clarkston-Highland, Washington =

- CDP
- Location of West Clarkston-Highland, Washington
- Coordinates: 46°23′15″N 117°03′30″W
- Country: United States
- State: Washington
- County: Asotin

Area
  - Total: 2.7 sq mi (6.9 km^{2})
  - Land: 2.7 sq mi (6.9 km^{2})
  - Water: 0 sq mi (0.0 km^{2})
- Elevation: 935 ft (285 m)

Population (2020)
  - Total: 5,488
  - Density: 1,764/sq mi (680.9/km^{2})
- Time zone: UTC-8 (Pacific (PST))
  - Summer (DST): UTC-7 (PDT)
- FIPS code: 53-77297
- GNIS feature ID: 2409547

West Clarkston-Highland is a census-designated place (CDP) in Asotin County, Washington, United States. It is part of the Lewiston, ID-WA Metropolitan Statistical Area. The population was 5,488 at the 2020 census.

== Geography ==
According to the United States Census Bureau, the CDP has a total area of 2.7 square miles (6.9 km^{2}), all of it land.

== Demographics ==
Historical population
Census	Pop.	Note	%±
1950	1,920		—
1960	2,851		48.5%
1970	3,797		33.2%
1980	3,683		−3.0%
1990	3,913		6.2%
2000	4,707		20.3%
2010	5,261		11.8%
2020	5,488		4.3%
U.S. Decennial Census; 1960 1970 1980 1990; 2000 2010

West Clarkston-Highland first appeared as an unincorporated community in the 1950 U.S. census; and as a census designated place in the 1980 U.S. census.

=== 2000 census ===
As of the census of 2000, there were 4,707 people, 1,994 households, and 1,328 families residing in the CDP. The population density was 1,763.5 inhabitants per square mile (680.9/km^{2}). There were 2,160 housing units at an average density of 809.2 per square mile (312.4/km^{2}). The racial makeup of the CDP was 94.99% White, 0.17% African American, 1.44% Native American, 0.51% Asian, 0.81% from other races, and 2.08% from two or more races. Hispanic or Latino of any race were 2.00% of the population.

There were 1,994 households, out of which 28.7% had children under the age of 18 living with them, 48.8% were married couples living together, 13.1% had a female householder with no husband present, and 33.4% were non-families. 27.4% of all households were made up of individuals, and 11.0% had someone living alone who was 65 years of age or older. The average household size was 2.35 and the average family size was 2.81.

In the CDP, the age distribution of the population shows 23.8% under the age of 18, 9.4% from 18 to 24, 25.5% from 25 to 44, 23.5% from 45 to 64, and 17.7% who were 65 years of age or older. The median age was 39 years. For every 100 females, there were 88.1 males. For every 100 females age 18 and over, there were 87.0 males.

The median income for a household in the CDP was $29,311, and the median income for a family was $31,673. Males had a median income of $29,349 versus $20,918 for females. The per capita income for the CDP was $15,762. About 15.7% of families and 18.9% of the population were below the poverty line, including 32.9% of those under age 18 and 6.5% of those age 65 or over.
