= George Creek (Asotin Creek tributary) =

Stream in Washington, U.S.

Coordinates: 46°19′35″N 117°06′21″W

George Creek is a stream in the U.S. state of Washington. It is a tributary of Asotin Creek.

George Creek was named after a local Indian named George who used the area as hunting ground.

== See also ==
- List of rivers of Washington (state)
