= Charley Creek (Asotin Creek tributary) =

River in Washington state, United States

Coordinates: 46°17′19″N 117°16′43″W

Charley Creek is a stream in the U.S. state of Washington. It is a tributary of Asotin Creek.

Charley Creek was named after Charles Lyon, a pioneer settler.

== See also ==
- List of rivers of Washington
