= City government in Washington (state) =

There are 281 municipalities in the U.S. state of Washington. State law determines the various powers its municipalities have.

== City classes ==
Legally, a city in Washington can be described primarily by its class. There are five classes of cities in Washington:

- 10 first class cities
- 9 second class cities
- 69 towns
- 1 unclassified city
- 192 code cities

First class cities are cities with a population over 10,000 at the time of reorganization and operating under a home rule charter. They are permitted to perform any function specifically granted them by Title 35 RCW (Revised Code of Washington). Among them are Seattle, Tacoma, Spokane, Vancouver, and Yakima.

Second class cities are cities with a population over 1,500 at the time of reorganization and operating without a home rule charter. Like first class cities, they are permitted to perform any function specifically granted them by Title 35 RCW. Among them are Port Orchard, Wapato, and Colville.

Towns are municipalities with a population of under 1,500 at the time of reorganization. Towns are not authorized to operate under a charter. Like the previously listed cities, they are permitted to perform any function specifically granted them by Title 35 RCW. Among them are Steilacoom, Friday Harbor, Eatonville, and Waterville. In 1994, the legislature made 1,500 the minimum population required to incorporate.

Unclassified cities are cities that are not operating under any other class. Only one city—Waitsburg, in Walla Walla County—is unclassified. It operates under the 1881 territorial charter under which it was organized, eight years before Washington was admitted to the Union in 1889.

Code cities were created by the state legislature in order to grant the greatest degree of local control to municipalities possible under the state constitution and general law. This classification has been adopted at the majority of municipalities in Washington, including Renton, Bellevue, Omak, Olympia, Longview, Pullman, and University Place.

Code cities (shorthand for optional municipal code cities, as encoded by Title 35A RCW) are authorized to perform any function not specifically denied them in the state constitution or by state law. They may perform any function granted to any other city classification under Title 35 RCW.

=== Historical classes ===
During the early decades of statehood, Washington was organized into a system of four classes. First class municipalities had a minimum of 20,000 people; second class, between 10,000 and 20,000; third class, between 1,500 and 10,000; and fourth class, between 300 and 1,500. Fourth class municipalities were considered to be towns or villages.

== Governmental forms ==
A city in Washington can be described secondarily by its form of government. Cities and towns are specifically authorized three forms of government:

- Commission (no cities)
- Mayor–council (228 cities)
- Council–manager (53 cities)

Code cities (see above), if their population is over 10,000, may incorporate as charter code cities. They may then "set out any plan of government deemed 'suitable for the good government of the city'" (RCW 35A.08.050), which need not be a commission, mayor-council, or council-manager form. No charter code city has opted for a different type of government as of 2012.

=== Commission ===
The city of Shelton was the last one still using the three-member commission form of government, until it switched to Council-Manager after a vote of the people in 2017.

=== Mayor-council ===
Most cities in Washington have this form of government, which calls for an elected mayor and an elected city council, including Seattle, Spokane, Kent, Everett, Bremerton, and Bellingham.

=== Council-manager ===
Cities with an elected council and appointed city manager include Yakima, Vancouver, Tacoma, Bellevue, Pasco, and Kennewick.
