= Asotin County, Washington =

County in Washington, United States

- County
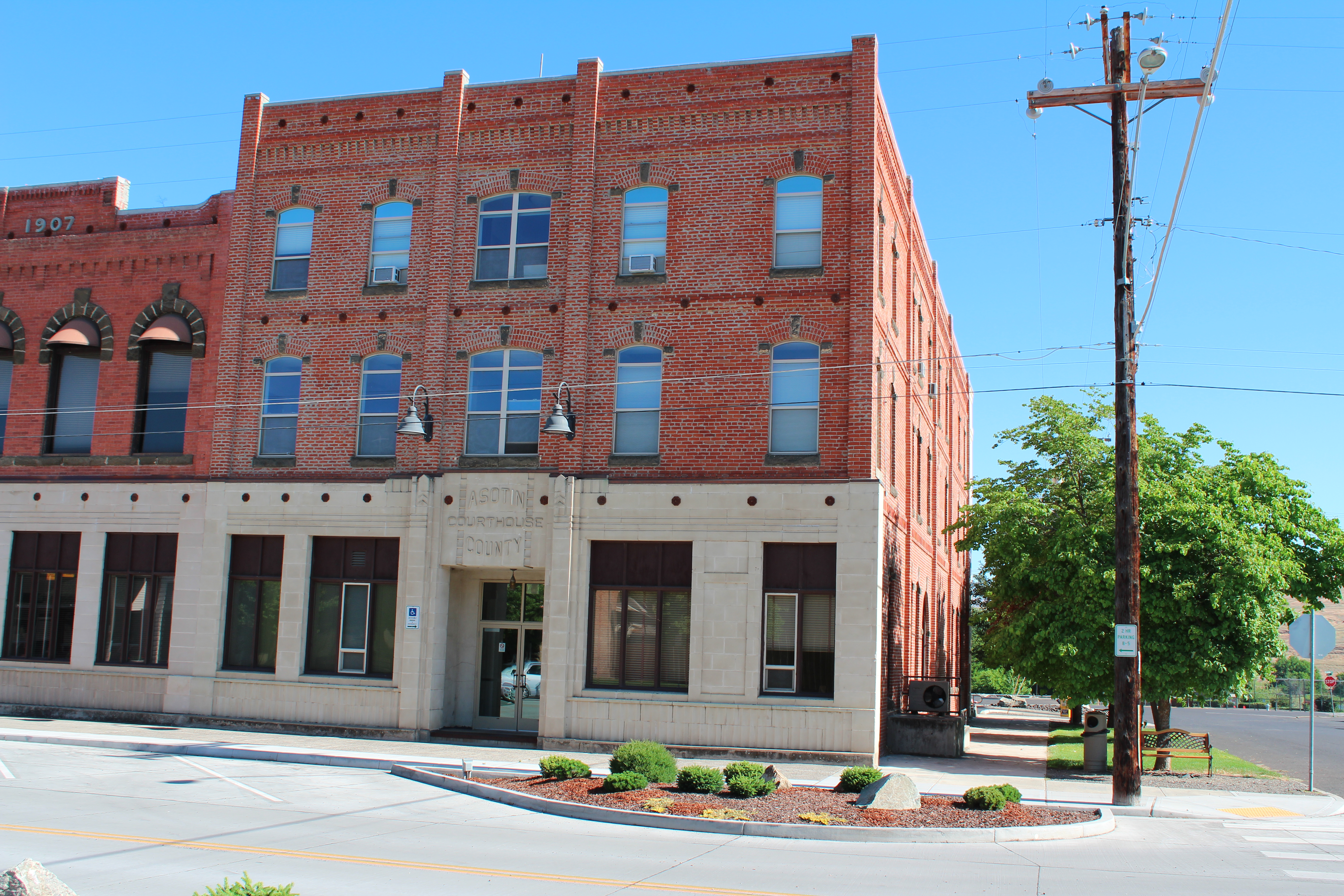
- Asotin County Courthouse

- Location within the U.S. state of Washington
- Coordinates: 46°11′N 117°11′W
- Country: United States
- State: Washington
- Founded: October 27, 1883
- Named for: Asotin Creek
- Seat: Asotin
- Largest city: Clarkston

Area
  - Total: 641 sq mi (1,660 km^{2})
  - Land: 636 sq mi (1,650 km^{2})
  - Water: 4.4 sq mi (11 km^{2}) 0.7%

Population (2020)
  - Total: 22,285
  - Estimate (2025): 22,545 ▲
  - Density: 35/sq mi (14/km^{2})
- Time zone: UTC−8 (Pacific)
  - Summer (DST): UTC−7 (PDT)
- Congressional district: 5th
- Website: www.asotincountywa.gov

Asotin County (/əˈsoʊtən/) is a county in the far southeastern corner of the U.S. state of Washington. As of the 2020 census, the population was 22,285. The county seat is at Asotin, and its largest city is Clarkston. The county was created out of Garfield County in 1883 and derives its name from a Nez Perce word meaning "Eel Creek." Asotin County is part of the Lewiston–Clarkston metropolitan area, which includes Nez Perce County, Idaho, and Asotin County. The county is also the easternmost in the state of Washington.

== History ==
Modern-day Asotin County lies within the historic territory of the indigenous Nez Perce people; the county derives its name from Has-shu-tin, a creek with abundant eels. The area was visited by the Lewis and Clark Expedition in 1805 and 1806; they were followed by American and Canadian fur traders and survey expeditions led by Benjamin Bonneville. The region was assigned to Skamania County in March 1854 as part of the organization of Washington Territory; later that year, it became part of Walla Walla County. Columbia County was split from the county in 1875 and portion further to create Garfield County in 1881. The southeastern portion of Garfield County was partitioned in 1883 to form Asotin County, which has remained unchanged since.

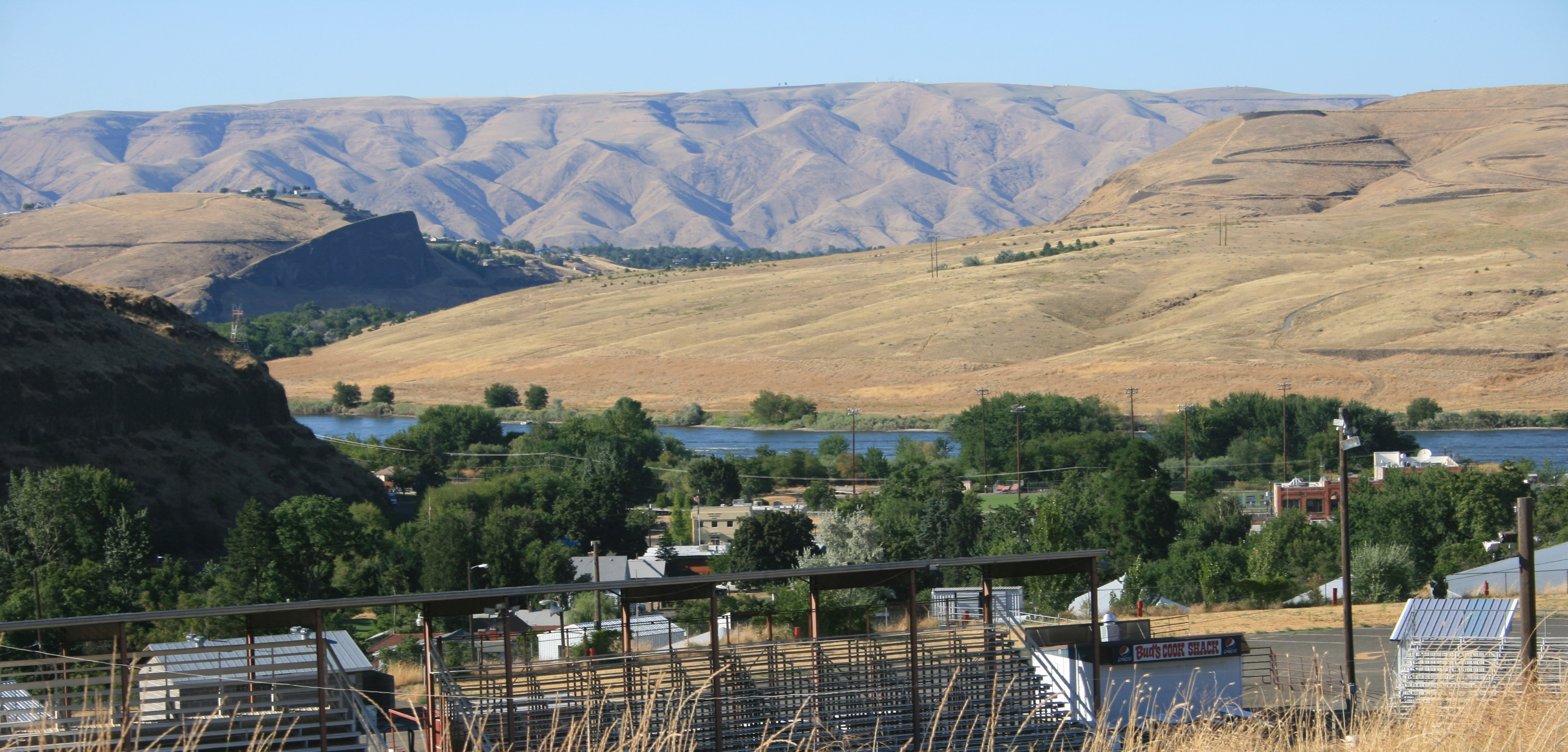
The city of Asotin, the county seat

The county was originally part of the Nez Perce Indian Reservation, which was later moved to Idaho. In 1862, Bob Bracken became the first permanent European settler of what would become Asotin County. The first settlement, Anatone, was founded in 1877 and followed within five years by other settlements along the Snake River. Assotin City was platted in 1880 and followed a year later by Asotin to the north; they were merged in 1886 after the northern settlement had overtaken Assotin City. The town of Clarkston, originally known as Lewiston and later Concord, grew rapidly after the opening of a bridge over the Snake River in 1899.

The county seat remains Asotin despite several attempts to move the county government to the larger city of Clarkston.

== Geography ==
According to the United States Census Bureau, the county has an area of 641 square miles (1,660 km^{2}), of which 636 square miles (1,650 km^{2}) is land and 4.4 square miles (11 km^{2}) (0.7%) is water. It is the fifth-smallest county in Washington by area. It is part of the Palouse, a wide and rolling prairie-like region of the middle Columbia basin.

=== Geographic features ===
- Snake River
- Sagebrush
- Joseph Canyon

=== Major highways ===
- U.S. Route 12
- State Route 129

=== Adjacent counties ===
- Whitman County – north
- Nez Perce County, Idaho – east
- Wallowa County, Oregon – south
- Garfield County – west

=== National protected area ===
- Umatilla National Forest (part)

== Communities ==
=== Cities ===
- Asotin (county seat)
- Clarkston

=== Extinct towns ===
- Cloverland
- Theon

=== Census-designated places ===
- Anatone
- Clarkston Heights-Vineland
- West Clarkston-Highland

=== Unincorporated communities ===
- Rogersburg
- Silcott

== Demographics ==
Historical population
Census	Pop.	Note	%±
1890	1,580		—
1900	3,366		113.0%
1910	5,831		73.2%
1920	6,539		12.1%
1930	8,136		24.4%
1940	8,365		2.8%
1950	10,878		30.0%
1960	12,909		18.7%
1970	13,799		6.9%
1980	16,823		21.9%
1990	17,605		4.6%
2000	20,551		16.7%
2010	21,623		5.2%
2020	22,285		3.1%
2025 (est.)	22,545	▲	1.2%
U.S. Decennial Census; 1790–1960 1900–1990; 1990–2000 2010–2020

=== 2020 census ===
As of the 2020 census, the county had a population of 22,285. Of the residents, 20.4% were under the age of 18 and 24.1% were 65 years of age or older; the median age was 45.3 years, and for every 100 females there were 94.9 males and for every 100 females age 18 and over there were 93.0 males. Of residents, 92.7% lived in urban areas and 7.3% lived in rural areas.

Asotin County, Washington – Racial and ethnic composition Note: the US Census treats Hispanic/Latino as an ethnic category. This table excludes Latinos from the racial categories and assigns them to a separate category. Hispanics/Latinos may be of any race.
Race / Ethnicity (NH = Non-Hispanic)	Pop 2000	Pop 2010	Pop 2020	% 2000	% 2010	% 2020
White alone (NH)	19,426	20,026	19,473	94.53%	92.61%	87.38%
Black or African American alone (NH)	34	89	113	0.17%	0.41%	0.51%
Native American or Alaska Native alone (NH)	245	272	262	1.19%	1.26%	1.18%
Asian alone (NH)	103	114	206	0.50%	0.53%	0.92%
Pacific Islander alone (NH)	5	36	34	0.02%	0.17%	0.15%
Other race alone (NH)	17	12	88	0.08%	0.06%	0.39%
Mixed race or Multiracial (NH)	320	431	1,194	1.56%	1.99%	5.36%
Hispanic or Latino (any race)	401	643	915	1.95%	2.97%	4.11%
Total	20,551	21,623	22,285	100.00%	100.00%	100.00%

The racial makeup of the county was 89.1% White, 0.5% Black or African American, 1.3% American Indian and Alaska Native, 0.9% Asian, 1.3% from some other race, and 6.6% from two or more races. Hispanic or Latino residents of any race comprised 4.1% of the population.

There were 9,349 households in the county, of which 26.0% had children under the age of 18 living with them and 27.7% had a female householder with no spouse or partner present. About 29.2% of all households were made up of individuals and 15.0% had someone living alone who was 65 years of age or older.

There were 10,034 housing units, of which 6.8% were vacant. Among occupied housing units, 68.4% were owner-occupied and 31.6% were renter-occupied. The homeowner vacancy rate was 1.6% and the rental vacancy rate was 5.6%.

=== 2010 census ===
As of the 2010 census, there were 21,623 people, 9,236 households, and 5,914 families living in the county. The population density was 34.0 inhabitants per square mile (13.1/km^{2}). There were 9,872 housing units at an average density of 15.5 units per square mile (6.0 units/km^{2}). The racial makeup of the county was 94.3% white, 1.4% American Indian, 0.5% Asian, 0.4% black or African American, 0.2% Pacific islander, 0.8% from other races, and 2.4% from two or more races. Those of Hispanic or Latino origin made up 3.0% of the population. In terms of ancestry, 32.4% were German, 14.8% were Irish, 13.7% were English, 7.5% were American, and 6.2% were Norwegian.

Of the 9,236 households, 27.7% had children under the age of 18 living with them, 47.5% were married couples living together, 12.1% had a female householder with no husband present, 36.0% were non-families, and 29.4% of all households were made up of individuals. The average household size was 2.32 and the average family size was 2.83. The median age was 43.5 years.

The median income for a household in the county was $41,665 and the median income for a family was $52,250. Males had a median income of $39,633 versus $28,475 for females. The per capita income for the county was $23,731. About 9.9% of families and 13.5% of the population were below the poverty line, including 21.1% of those under age 18 and 6.7% of those age 65 or over.

=== 2000 census ===
As of the 2000 census, there were 20,551 people, 8,364 households, and 5,654 families living in the county. The population density was 32 inhabitants per square mile (12/km^{2}). There were 9,111 housing units at an average density of 14 units per square mile (5.4 units/km^{2}). The racial makeup of the county was 95.62% White, 0.19% Black or African American, 1.27% Native American, 0.51% Asian, 0.02% Pacific Islander, 0.63% from other races, and 1.77% from two or more races. 1.95% of the population were Hispanic or Latino of any race. 25.9% were of German, 12.4% English, 11.9% Irish and 11.0% United States or American ancestry. 97.9% spoke English and 1.6% Spanish as their first language.

There were 8,364 households, out of which 31.00% had children under the age of 18 living with them, 51.40% were married couples living together, 11.90% had a female householder with no husband present, and 32.40% were non-families. 27.00% of all households were made up of individuals, and 11.70% had someone living alone who was 65 years of age or older. The average household size was 2.42 and the average family size was 2.91.

In the county, the population was spread out, with 25.50% under the age of 18, 8.10% from 18 to 24, 26.10% from 25 to 44, 24.00% from 45 to 64, and 16.30% who were 65 years of age or older. The median age was 39 years. For every 100 females, there were 91.10 males. For every 100 females age 18 and over, there were 86.30 males.

The median income for a household in the county was $33,524, and the median income for a family was $40,592. Males had a median income of $35,810 versus $22,218 for females. The per capita income for the county was $17,748. About 11.60% of families and 15.40% of the population were below the poverty line, including 22.70% of those under age 18 and 6.70% of those age 65 or over.

== Politics ==
United States presidential election results for Asotin County, Washington
Year	Republican		Democratic		Third party(ies)	
Year	No.	%	No.	%	No.	%
1892	194	52.57%	143	38.75%	32	8.67%
1896	214	43.94%	269	55.24%	4	0.82%
1900	398	52.37%	328	43.16%	34	4.47%
1904	747	72.59%	227	22.06%	55	5.34%
1908	648	59.61%	365	33.58%	74	6.81%
1912	579	31.38%	551	29.86%	715	38.75%
1916	1,004	42.94%	1,136	48.59%	198	8.47%
1920	1,210	64.84%	497	26.63%	159	8.52%
1924	1,094	46.51%	508	21.60%	750	31.89%
1928	1,812	69.37%	776	29.71%	24	0.92%
1932	960	31.45%	1,994	65.33%	98	3.21%
1936	916	26.60%	2,261	65.67%	266	7.73%
1940	1,483	41.07%	2,107	58.35%	21	0.58%
1944	1,367	41.80%	1,888	57.74%	15	0.46%
1948	1,384	38.63%	2,054	57.33%	145	4.05%
1952	2,722	55.62%	2,160	44.14%	12	0.25%
1956	2,608	50.15%	2,586	49.73%	6	0.12%
1960	2,640	46.00%	3,093	53.89%	6	0.10%
1964	1,777	32.69%	3,657	67.27%	2	0.04%
1968	2,307	42.45%	2,693	49.56%	434	7.99%
1972	2,911	50.36%	2,559	44.27%	310	5.36%
1976	2,752	47.22%	2,898	49.73%	178	3.05%
1980	3,275	49.18%	2,724	40.91%	660	9.91%
1984	3,876	55.21%	3,042	43.33%	103	1.47%
1988	2,874	45.02%	3,422	53.60%	88	1.38%
1992	2,425	31.92%	3,239	42.64%	1,932	25.43%
1996	2,860	39.12%	3,349	45.81%	1,102	15.07%
2000	4,909	61.48%	2,736	34.26%	340	4.26%
2004	5,320	60.55%	3,319	37.78%	147	1.67%
2008	5,451	55.74%	4,139	42.32%	190	1.94%
2012	5,654	57.11%	4,003	40.43%	244	2.46%
2016	5,741	57.56%	3,134	31.42%	1,099	11.02%
2020	7,319	61.24%	4,250	35.56%	382	3.20%
2024	7,004	61.07%	4,082	35.59%	382	3.33%

Generally, Asotin County is considered a staunchly Republican area, although it has been known to vote for Democrats, especially on the state level. Currently the county is represented at the county commission level by two Republicans and one Independent.

In the 2004 Presidential election slightly over 60 percent of the vote went to Republican George W. Bush. It was one of 11 of Washington's 39 counties where Bush received a lower percentage of the vote in 2004 than in 2000. Conversely, even though nearly 60 percent of voters selected the Democratic governor Gary Locke in 2000, in 2004 the Democratic gubernatorial nominee Christine Gregoire received only 41 percent of the vote.

In 2004, 27% of presidential votes were cast from incorporated Clarkston, while 61% was from unincorporated suburbs of Clarkston (34% from Clarkston Heights, 12% from West Clarkston, 9% from South Clarkston, and 6% from Swallows Nest). An additional 6% was cast from the incorporated city of Asotin, with rural areas around Asotin accounting for 4% of the vote and areas around the unincorporated community of Anatone making up 2% of the vote.

By and large, the most competitive areas are Clarkston and its suburbs. Democratic presidential nominee John Kerry won two precincts in 2004, one each in Clarkston and West Clarkston. Bush received 54 percent of the vote in West Clarkston, 55 in Clarkston, and 57 percent in South Clarkston. However, he received larger victories of 64 percent in Clarkston Heights and 67 percent in Swallows Nest. Areas around both Asotin and Anatone delivered 2-to-1 victories, with the lone exception of one of the two incorporated Asotin precincts.

== Infrastructure ==
=== Transportation ===
U.S. Route 12 and State Route 129 are the main highways of Asotin County and provide connections to neighboring areas. U.S. Route 12 runs east–west across southern Washington and crosses the Snake River from Clarkston into Lewiston, Idaho; State Route 129 runs north–south from Wallowa County, Oregon, and through Asotin to Clarkston.

Public transportation within the county is provided by the Asotin County Public Transportation Benefit Area (also called the Asotin County PTBA), which has six routes that primarily serve Clarkston and Asotin. The system extends into Lewiston for some trips and has connections with the Garfield County Transportation Authority. The public transportation benefit area was founded in 2003 and is funded by a 0.2 percent sales tax within Asotin County that was approved by voters in 2004. It initially contracted out operations to the Lewiston-based Valley Transit system until January 2010, when the PTBA wished to expand its system and the city government took over Valley Transit. The Asotin County PTBA carried over 55,000 passenger trips on its buses and paratransit vehicles.

== Gallery ==
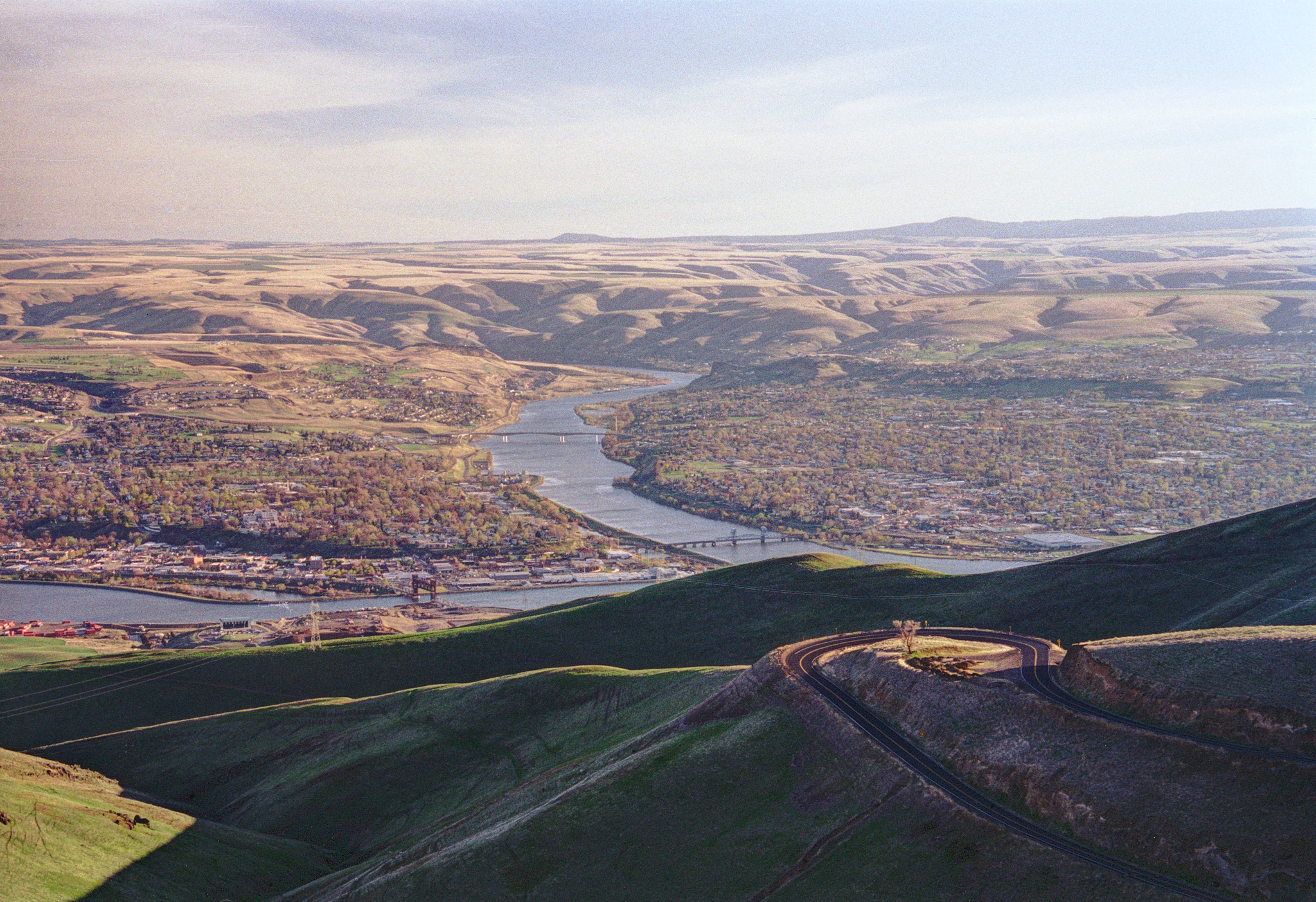
Lewiston, ID and Clarkston, WA

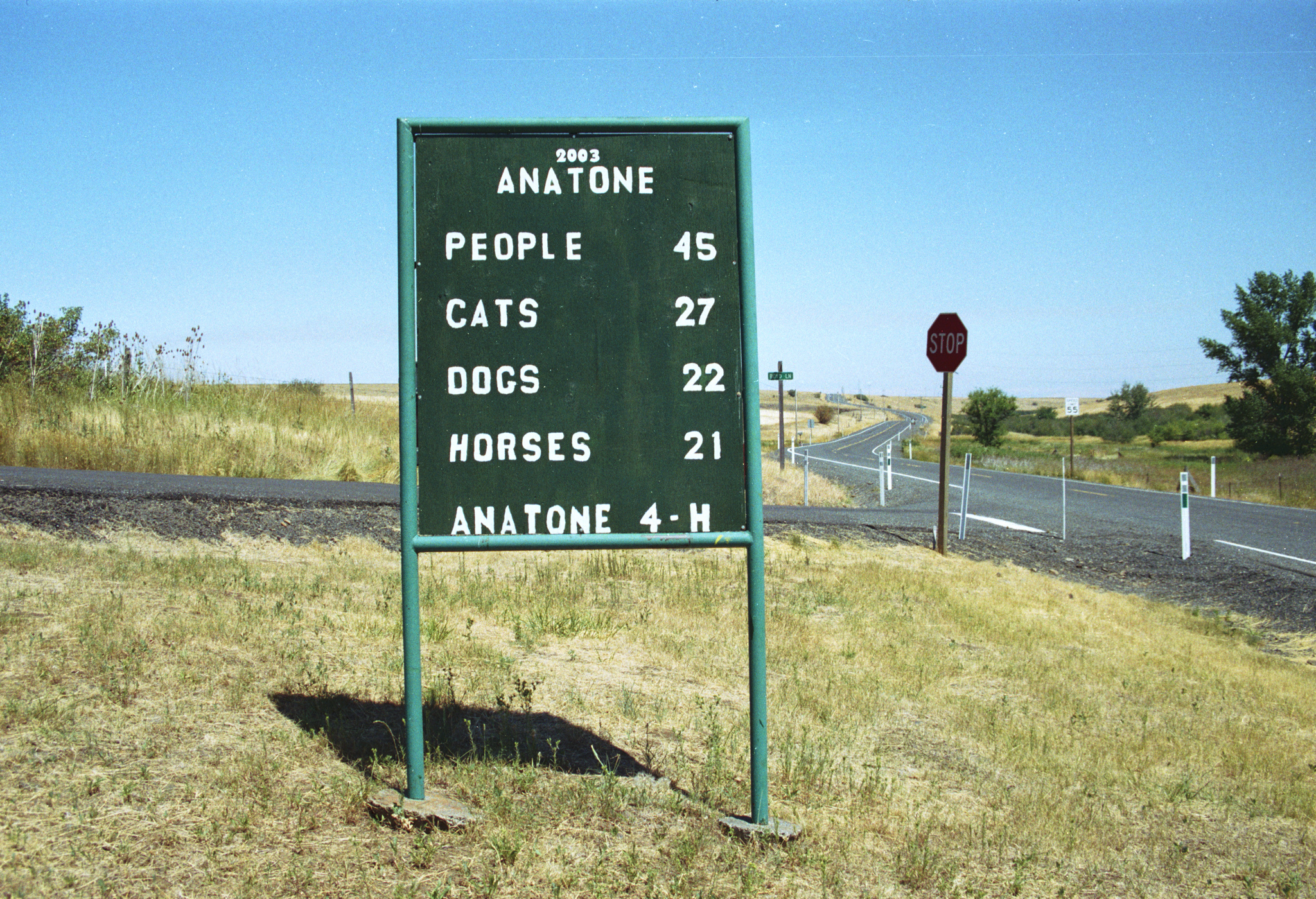
Anatone, WA

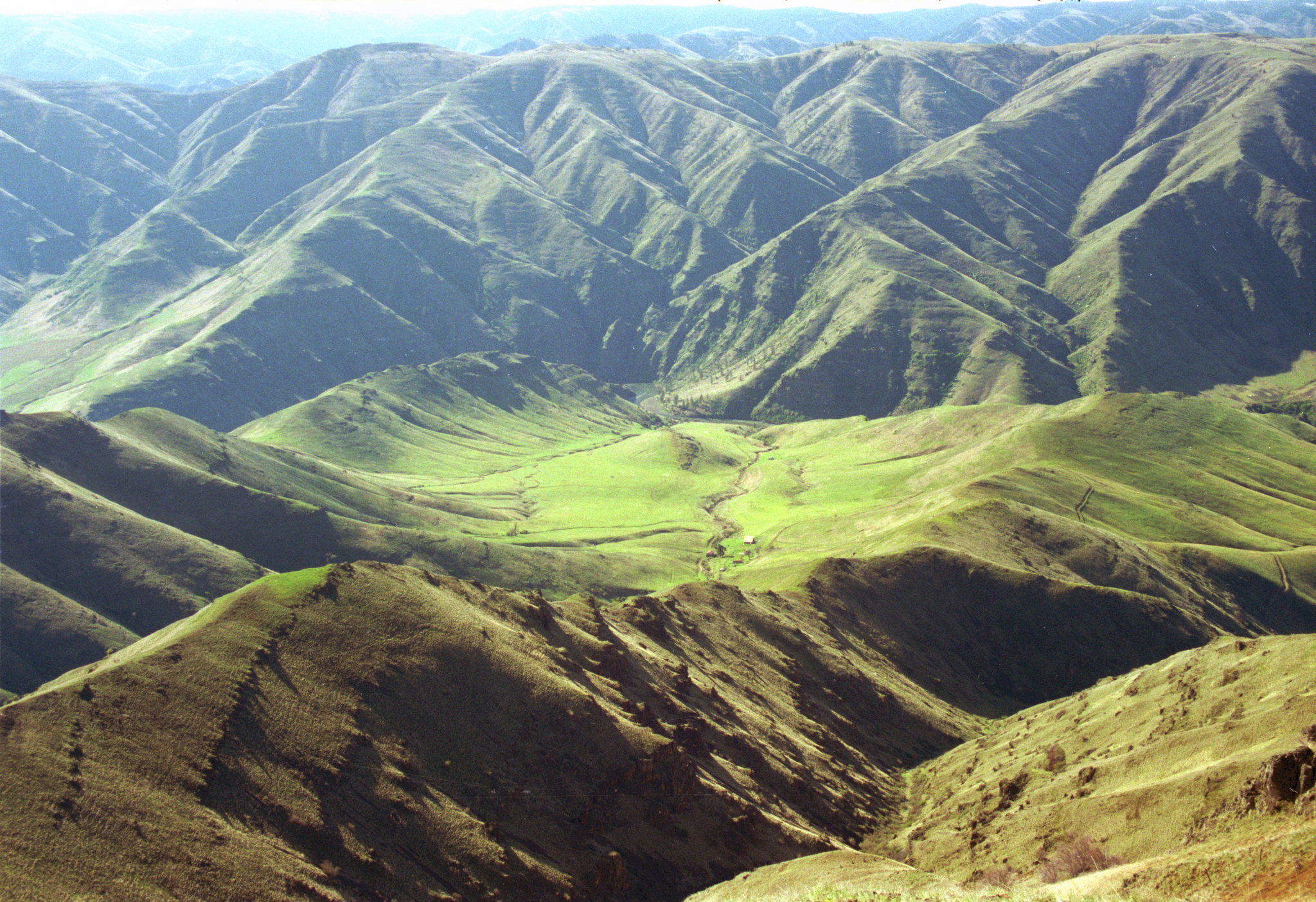
Joseph Canyon as seen from Fields Spring State Park

== See also ==
- National Register of Historic Places listings in Asotin County, Washington
- List of counties in Washington
