= Asotin, Washington =

- City
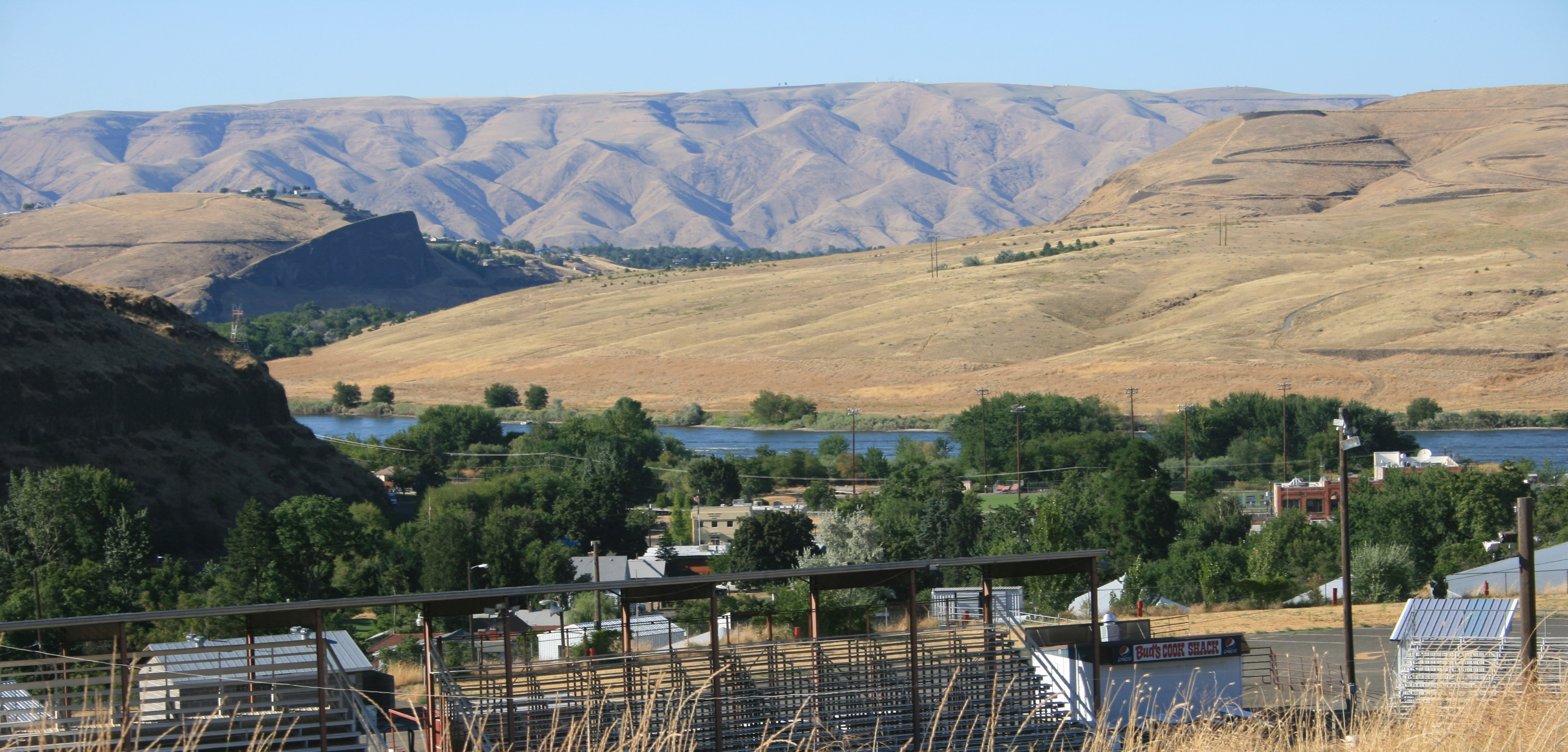
- Asotin viewed from the elevated land to the south. Land across the river is in Idaho.

- Location of Asotin, Washington
- Coordinates: 46°20′13″N 117°02′34″W
- Country: United States
- State: Washington
- County: Asotin

Government
  - Mayor: Dwayne Paris

Area
  - Total: 1.33 sq mi (3.44 km^{2})
  - Land: 1.14 sq mi (2.96 km^{2})
  - Water: 0.19 sq mi (0.48 km^{2})
- Elevation: 873 ft (266 m)

Population (2020)
  - Total: 1,204
  - Density: 1,050/sq mi (407/km^{2})
- Time zone: UTC-8 (Pacific (PST))
  - Summer (DST): UTC-7 (PDT)
- ZIP code: 99402
- Area code: 509
- FIPS code: 53-03075
- GNIS feature ID: 2409742
- Website: cityofasotin.org

Asotin (/əˈsoʊtən/ ə-SOH-tən) is a city in and the county seat of Asotin County, Washington, United States. The population of the city was 1,204 at the 2020 census. It is part of the Lewiston, ID-WA Metropolitan Statistical Area.

== History ==
The name Asotin is derived from a Nez Perce language term meaning "eel creek." It was founded in 1878 by Alexander Sumpster. A river ferry stop at Asotin was set up by 1881.

In 1931, Herbert Niccolls Jr., a 12-year-old, was convicted of the murder of the Asotin County sheriff.

== Geography ==
Asotin is located south of Clarkston, on the west bank of the Snake River.

According to the United States Census Bureau, the city has a total area of 1.19 square miles (3.08 km^{2}), of which, 1.05 square miles (2.72 km^{2}) is land and 0.14 square miles (0.36 km^{2}) is water.

=== Climate ===
This region experiences very warm and dry summers, with no average monthly temperatures above 71.6 °F (22.0 °C). According to the Köppen Climate Classification system, Asotin has a warm-summer Mediterranean climate, abbreviated "Csb" on climate maps.

== Demographics ==
Historical population
Census	Pop.	Note	%±
1890	200		—
1900	470		135.0%
1910	820		74.5%
1920	852		3.9%
1930	697		−18.2%
1940	686		−1.6%
1950	740		7.9%
1960	745		0.7%
1970	637		−14.5%
1980	943		48.0%
1990	981		4.0%
2000	1,095		11.6%
2010	1,251		14.2%
2020	1,204		−3.8%
source: U.S. Decennial Census

=== 2020 census ===
As of the 2020 census, Asotin had a population of 1,204, and the median age was 45.0 years. 23.7% of residents were under the age of 18 and 25.2% were 65 years of age or older. For every 100 females there were 94.2 males, and for every 100 females age 18 and over there were 88.7 males age 18 and over.

100.0% of residents lived in urban areas, while 0.0% lived in rural areas.

There were 491 households in Asotin, of which 33.6% had children under the age of 18 living in them. Of all households, 50.1% were married-couple households, 16.3% were households with a male householder and no spouse or partner present, and 24.8% were households with a female householder and no spouse or partner present. About 24.3% of all households were made up of individuals and 13.7% had someone living alone who was 65 years of age or older.

There were 508 housing units, of which 3.3% were vacant. The homeowner vacancy rate was 0.6% and the rental vacancy rate was 2.9%.

Racial composition as of the 2020 census
Race	Number	Percent
White	1,088	90.4%
Black or African American	0	0.0%
American Indian and Alaska Native	13	1.1%
Asian	2	0.2%
Native Hawaiian and Other Pacific Islander	6	0.5%
Some other race	15	1.2%
Two or more races	80	6.6%
Hispanic or Latino (of any race)	29	2.4%

=== 2010 census ===
As of the 2010 census, there were 1,251 people, 500 households, and 352 families residing in the city. The population density was 1,191.4 inhabitants per square mile (460.0/km^{2}). There were 537 housing units at an average density of 511.4 units per square mile (197.5 units/km^{2}). The racial makeup of the city was 93.5% White, 1.0% African American, 1.5% Native American, 0.6% Asian, 1.0% Pacific Islander, 0.2% from other races, and 2.2% from two or more races. Hispanic or Latino people of any race were 2.2% of the population.

There were 500 households, of which 33.0% had children under the age of 18 living with them, 51.6% were married couples living together, 13.2% had a female householder with no husband present, 5.6% had a male householder with no wife present, and 29.6% were non-families. 24.0% of all households were made up of individuals, and 11.2% had someone living alone who was 65 years of age or older. The average household size was 2.50 and the average family size was 2.93.

The median age in the city was 41 years. 25.3% of residents were under the age of 18; 6.7% were between the ages of 18 and 24; 22.8% were from 25 to 44; 27.8% were from 45 to 64; and 17.6% were 65 years of age or older. The gender makeup of the city was 46.8% male and 53.2% female.

=== 2000 census ===
As of the census of 2000, there were 1,095 people, 419 households, and 321 families residing in the city. The population density was 1,040.1 inhabitants per square mile (401.6/km^{2}). There were 440 housing units at an average density of 418.0 units per square mile (161.4 units/km^{2}). The racial makeup of the city was 97.08% White, 0.18% African American, 1.00% Native American, 0.37% Asian, 0.18% from other races, and 1.19% from two or more races. Hispanic or Latino people of any race were 1.55% of the population.

There were 419 households, out of which 38.4% had children under the age of 18 living with them, 53.9% were married couples living together, 18.9% had a female householder with no husband present, and 23.2% were non-families. 19.3% of all households were made up of individuals, and 9.1% had someone living alone who was 65 years of age or older. The average household size was 2.61 and the average family size was 2.96.

In the city, the age distribution of the population shows 29.3% under the age of 18, 6.5% from 18 to 24, 25.4% from 25 to 44, 24.6% from 45 to 64, and 14.2% who were 65 years of age or older. The median age was 39 years. For every 100 females, there were 88.8 males. For every 100 females age 18 and over, there were 81.3 males.

The median income for a household in the city was $35,083, and the median income for a family was $37,115. Males had a median income of $34,844 versus $21,063 for females. The per capita income for the city was $15,257. About 16.4% of families and 19.4% of the population were below the poverty line, including 30.2% of those under age 18 and 6.8% of those age 65 or over.

== Notable people ==
- Jesse Davis, offensive tackle for the Miami Dolphins of the NFL
- Kenneth W. Ford (1908–1997), American businessman who established Roseburg Forest Products
