= Clarkston, Washington =

- City
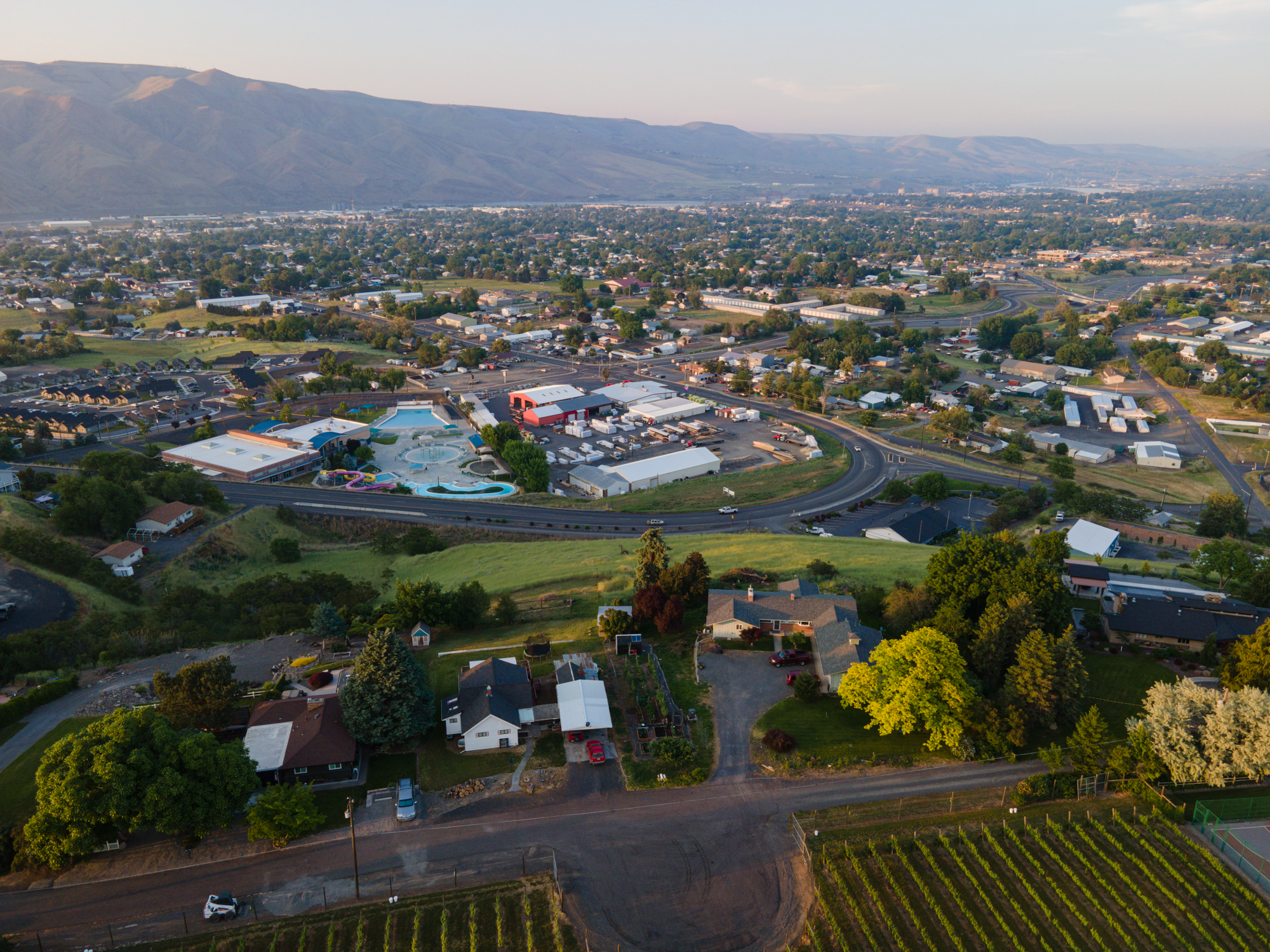
- View of Clarkston from the southwest
- Interactive map of Clarkston, Washington
- Coordinates: 46.415°N 117.050°W
- Country: United States
- State: Washington
- County: Asotin
- Settled: 1862
- Incorporated: August 14, 1902
- Named for: William Clark

Government
  - Type: Mayor–council
  - Mayor: Monika Lawrence

Area
  - City: 2.230 sq mi (5.776 km^{2})
  - Land: 2.056 sq mi (5.325 km^{2})
  - Water: 0.174 sq mi (0.451 km^{2}) 7.8%
- Elevation: 810 ft (247 m)

Population (2020)
  - City: 7,161
  - Estimate (2024): 7,138
  - Density: 3,483/sq mi (1,345/km^{2})
  - Urban: 54,798
  - Metro: 65,370
- Time zone: UTC−8 (Pacific (PST))
  - Summer (DST): UTC−7 (PDT)
- ZIP Code: 99403
- Area code: 509
- FIPS code: 53-12630
- GNIS feature ID: 2409469
- Website: clarkston-wa.com

Clarkston is a city in Asotin County, Washington, United States. It is part of the Lewiston–Clarkston, ID-WA metropolitan area, and is located west of Lewiston, Idaho, across the Snake River. The population was 7,161 at the 2020 census, and was estimated at 7,138 in 2024.

== History ==
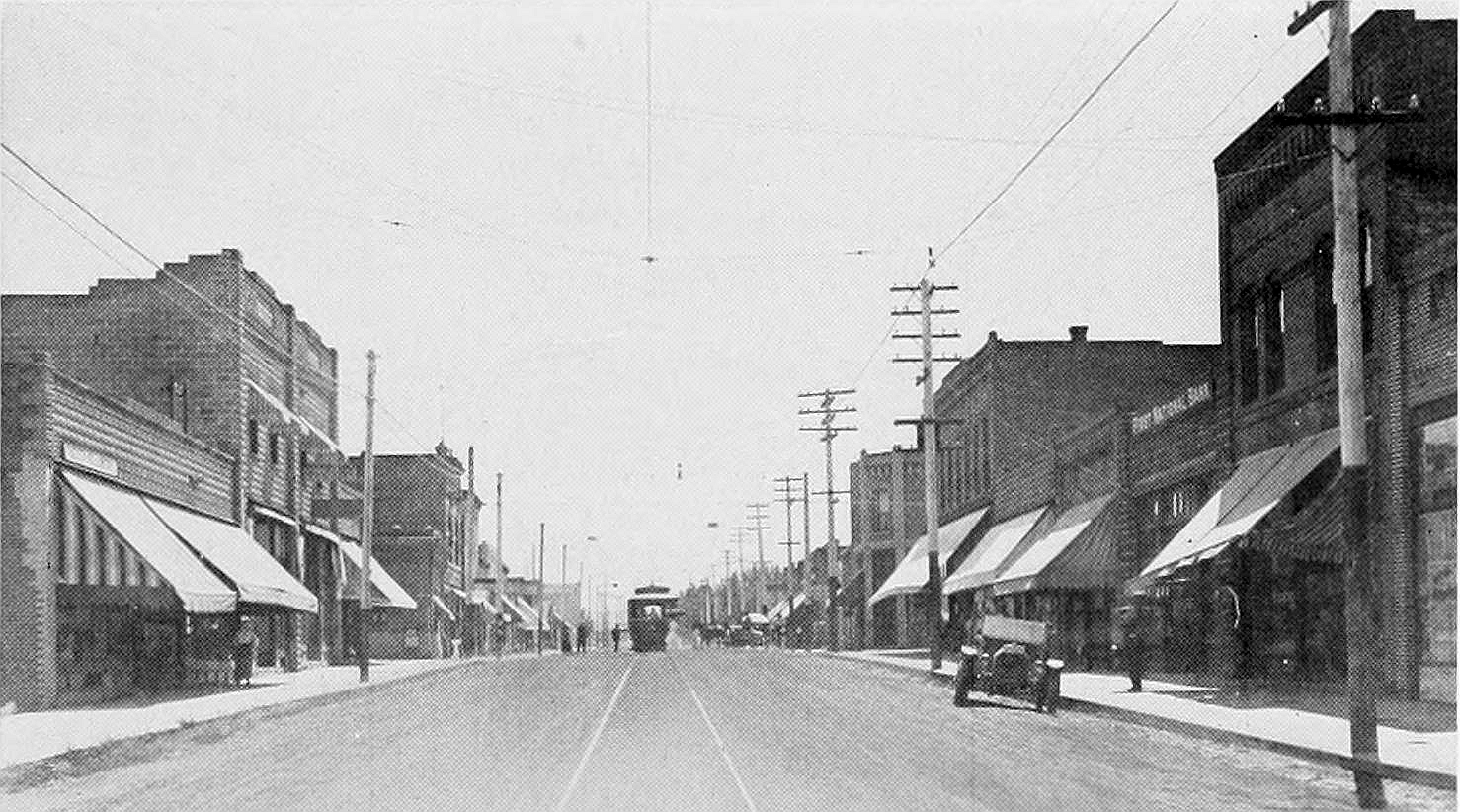
Clarkston, 1918

Clarkston was first settled in 1862 by Robert Bracken, and was officially incorporated on August 14, 1902. Before becoming an official town, the area was known by various names, including Jawbone Flat, and Concord (after Concord, Massachusetts).

The name Clarkston is a reference to William Clark, of the Lewis and Clark Expedition fame. Directly east across the Snake River is Lewiston, named for Meriwether Lewis and the larger and older of the two cities. The expedition passed westbound through the area by canoe in 1805 on October 10; neither Lewis nor Clark ever visited the Clarkston side of the river. Eastbound, they returned to the area in early May 1806.

== Geography ==
Clarkston is in the Lewis-Clark Valley, at the confluence of the Snake and Clearwater rivers. Immediately across the Snake River from Clarkston is the city of Lewiston, Idaho.

According to the United States Census Bureau, the city has a total area of 2.230 square miles (5.78 km^{2}), of which 2.056 square miles (5.33 km^{2}) is land and 0.174 square miles (0.45 km^{2}) (7.8%) is water.

=== Climate ===
This region experiences hot and dry summers, with average monthly temperatures in the upper-80s to mid-90s, but some days reach 105 °F (41 °C). The official record high of 118 °F (48 °C) was set in August 2018; the unofficial record high, set in June 2021, was 122.9 °F (50.5 °C).

According to the Köppen Climate Classification system, Clarkston has a warm-summer Mediterranean climate, abbreviated "Csb" on climate maps.

== Demographics ==
Historical population
Census	Pop.	Note	%±
1910	1,257		—
1920	1,859		47.9%
1930	2,870		54.4%
1940	3,116		8.6%
1950	5,617		80.3%
1960	6,209		10.5%
1970	6,312		1.7%
1980	6,903		9.4%
1990	6,753		−2.2%
2000	7,337		8.6%
2010	7,229		−1.5%
2020	7,161		−0.9%
2024 (est.)	7,138		−0.3%
U.S. Decennial Census; 2020 Census

As of the 2023 American Community Survey, there are 2,664 estimated households in Clarkston with an average of 2.7 persons per household. The city has a median household income of $53,092. Approximately 19.3% of the city's population lives at or below the poverty line. Clarkston has an estimated 59.2% employment rate, with 17.6% of the population holding a bachelor's degree or higher and 92.8% holding a high school diploma. There were 2,979 housing units at an average density of 1,448.93 per square mile (559.4/km^{2}).

=== Racial and ethnic composition ===
Clarkston, Washington – racial and ethnic composition Note: the US Census treats Hispanic/Latino as an ethnic category. This table excludes Latinos from the racial categories and assigns them to a separate category. Hispanics/Latinos may be of any race.
Race / ethnicity (NH = non-Hispanic)	Pop. 1980	Pop. 1990	Pop. 2000	Pop. 2010	Pop. 2020
White alone (NH)	6,683 (96.81%)	6,406 (94.86%)		6,505 (89.98%)	6,078 (84.88%)
Black or African American alone (NH)	9 (0.13%)	20 (0.30%)		47 (0.65%)	
Native American or Alaska Native alone (NH)	—	126 (1.87%)		140 (1.94%)	
Asian alone (NH)	—	49 (0.73%)		47 (0.65%)	
Pacific Islander alone (NH)	—	—		6 (0.08%)	
Other race alone (NH)	130 (1.88%)	1 (0.01%)		5 (0.07%)	
Mixed race or multiracial (NH)	—	—		190 (2.63%)	
Hispanic or Latino (any race)	81 (1.17%)	151 (2.24%)	188 (2.56%)	289 (4.00%)	363 (5.07%)
Total	6,903 (100.00%)	6,753 (100.00%)	7,337 (100.00%)	7,229 (100.00%)	7,161 (100.00%)

=== 2020 census ===
As of the 2020 census, there were 7,161 people and 3,057 households in the city. The population density was 3,482.98 inhabitants per square mile (1,344.8/km^{2}). There were 3,287 housing units at an average density of 1,598.74 per square mile (617.3/km^{2}).

The median age was 38.6 years; 22.1% of residents were under the age of 18 and 18.8% of residents were 65 years of age or older. For every 100 females there were 91.7 males, and for every 100 females age 18 and over there were 86.6 males age 18 and over.

There were 3,057 households, of which 27.6% had children under the age of 18 living in them. Of all households, 30.7% were married-couple households, 22.7% were households with a male householder and no spouse or partner present, and 37.1% were households with a female householder and no spouse or partner present. About 36.8% of all households were made up of individuals and 15.9% had someone living alone who was 65 years of age or older.

There were 3,287 housing units, of which 7.0% were vacant. The homeowner vacancy rate was 2.9% and the rental vacancy rate was 5.6%.

100.0% of residents lived in urban areas, while 0.0% lived in rural areas.

Racial composition as of the 2020 census
Race	Number	Percent
White	6,253	87.3%
Black or African American	64	0.9%
American Indian and Alaska Native	136	1.9%
Asian	77	1.1%
Native Hawaiian and Other Pacific Islander	8	0.1%
Some other race	97	1.4%
Two or more races	526	7.3%
Hispanic or Latino (of any race)	363	5.1%

=== 2010 census ===
As of the 2010 census, there were 7,229 people, 3,226 households, and 1,744 families residing in the city. The population density was 3,596.5 inhabitants per square mile (1,388.6/km^{2}). There were 3,411 housing units at an average density of 1,697.0 per square mile (655.2/km^{2}). The racial makeup of the city was 92.06% White, 0.69% African American, 2.14% Native American, 0.69% Asian, 0.08% Pacific Islander, 1.22% from some other races and 3.11% from two or more races. Hispanic or Latino people of any race were 4.00% of the population.

There were 3,226 households, of which 28.4% had children under the age of 18 living with them, 33.1% were married couples living together, 16.0% had a female householder with no husband present, 5.0% had a male householder with no wife present, and 45.9% were non-families. 38.3% of all households were made up of individuals, and 15.2% had someone living alone who was 65 years of age or older. The average household size was 2.20 and the average family size was 2.88.

The median age in the city was 37.7 years. 22.7% of residents were under the age of 18; 10.1% were between the ages of 18 and 24; 25.1% were from 25 to 44; 25.2% were from 45 to 64; and 16.9% were 65 years of age or older. The gender makeup of the city was 47.4% male and 52.6% female.

=== 2000 census ===
As of the 2000 census, there were 7,337 people, 3,120 households, and 1,790 families residing in the city. The population density was 3,805.4 inhabitants per square mile (1,469.3/km^{2}). There were 3,414 housing units at an average density of 1,770.7 per square mile (683.7/km^{2}). The racial makeup of the city was 94.43% White, 0.34% African American, 1.61% Native American, 0.65% Asian, 0.03% Pacific Islander, 0.79% from some other races and 2.15% from two or more races. Hispanic or Latino people of any race were 2.56% of the population.

There were 3,120 households, out of which 29.9% had children under the age of 18 living with them, 37.1% were married couples living together, 15.7% had a female householder with no husband present, and 42.6% were non-families. 35.7% of all households were made up of individuals, and 15.6% had someone living alone who was 65 years of age or older. The average household size was 2.26 and the average family size was 2.92.

In the city, the age distribution of the population shows 25.7% under the age of 18, 9.7% from 18 to 24, 26.6% from 25 to 44, 20.0% from 45 to 64, and 18.0% who were 65 years of age or older. The median age was 36 years. For every 100 females, there were 86.9 males. For every 100 females age 18 and over, there were 79.3 males.

The median income for a household in the city was $25,907, and the median income for a family was $32,093. Males had a median income of $31,434 versus $20,654 for females. The per capita income for the city was $14,673. About 15.5% of families and 20.6% of the population were below the poverty line, including 27.6% of those under age 18 and 8.1% of those age 65 or over.

== Economy ==
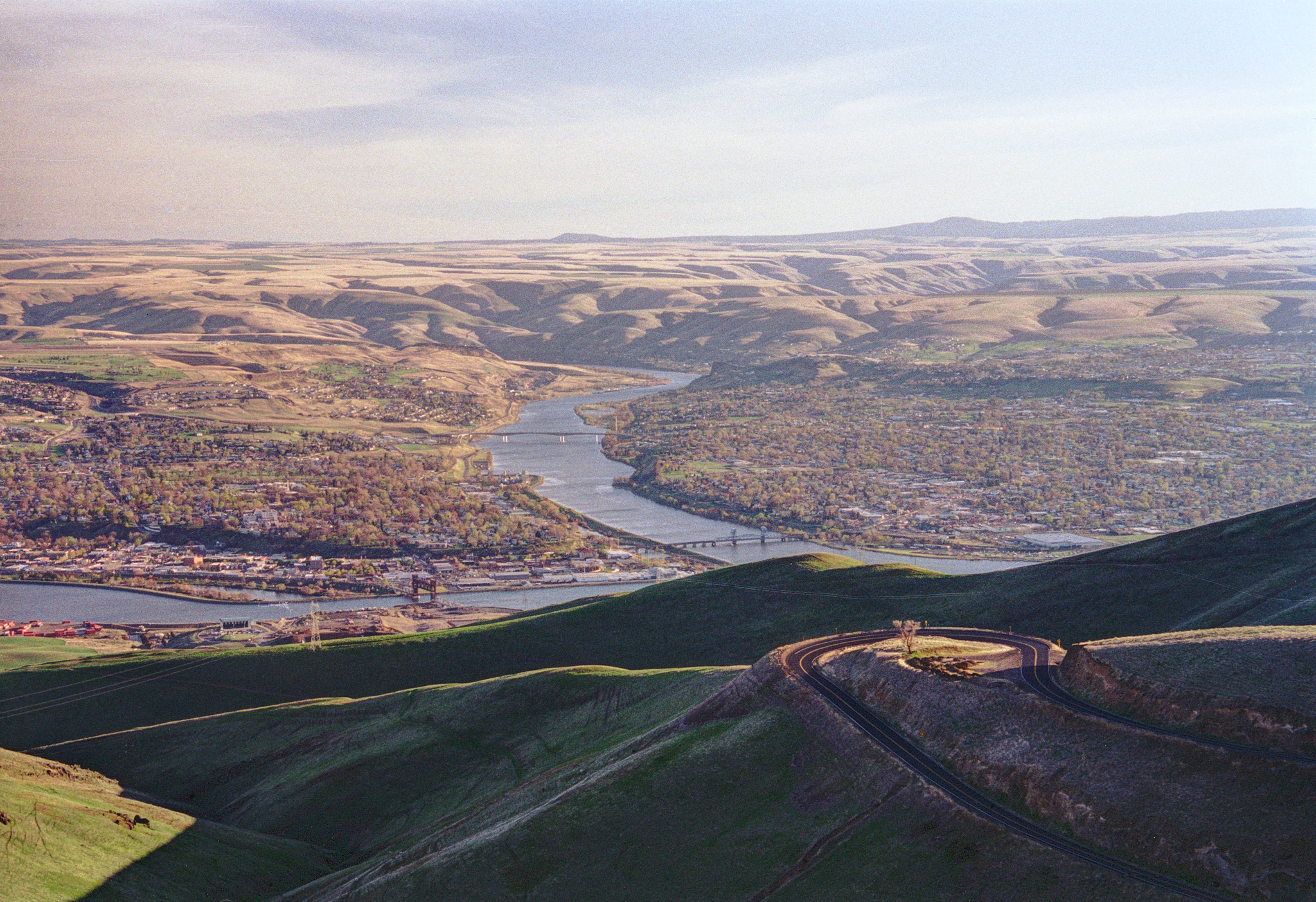
View of Lewiston and Clarkston from the north

=== Port ===
The Port of Clarkston is home to one of the largest cranes on a navigable waterway east of Portland. Agriculture is a major industry in the area and the port handles a lot of barge traffic carrying grains. The paper company Clearwater Paper Corporation transports wood chips and sawdust via barges for use at a Lewiston manufacturing plant. Due to its inland location on the Snake River, the port handles goods headed out to Portland-Vancouver, and inland to distributors upstream.

The port's marina has accommodations for personal boats and yachts, many of which travel through the nearby Hells Canyon.

== Education ==
=== K–12 ===
There are four public elementary schools in Clarkston: Parkway Elementary School, Grantham Elementary School, Heights Elementary School, and Highland Elementary School, which serve grades K–6. In addition, there is one middle school, Lincoln Middle School, which serves grades 7–8.

Clarkston has one four-year high school, Charles Francis Adams High School, more commonly known as Clarkston High School. Its enrollment for grades 9–12 is approximately 700, with over 100 staff members. Campus facilities include a library, football field, performing arts stage, and a tennis court.

Clarkston is also home to Holy Family Catholic School, serving grades K–8.

=== Higher education ===
Opportunities for higher education within city limits are limited. Walla Walla Community College (est. 1967) includes a branch campus in Clarkston that serves the area. Just across the Snake River in west Lewiston is Lewis–Clark State College, a four-year public college. To the north on the Palouse are the states' land grant universities: Washington State University in Pullman and the University of Idaho in Moscow.

== Notable Person ==
- Joel Dahmen, professional golfer
