= Columbia River Basalt Group =

Continental flood basalt province in the Western United States

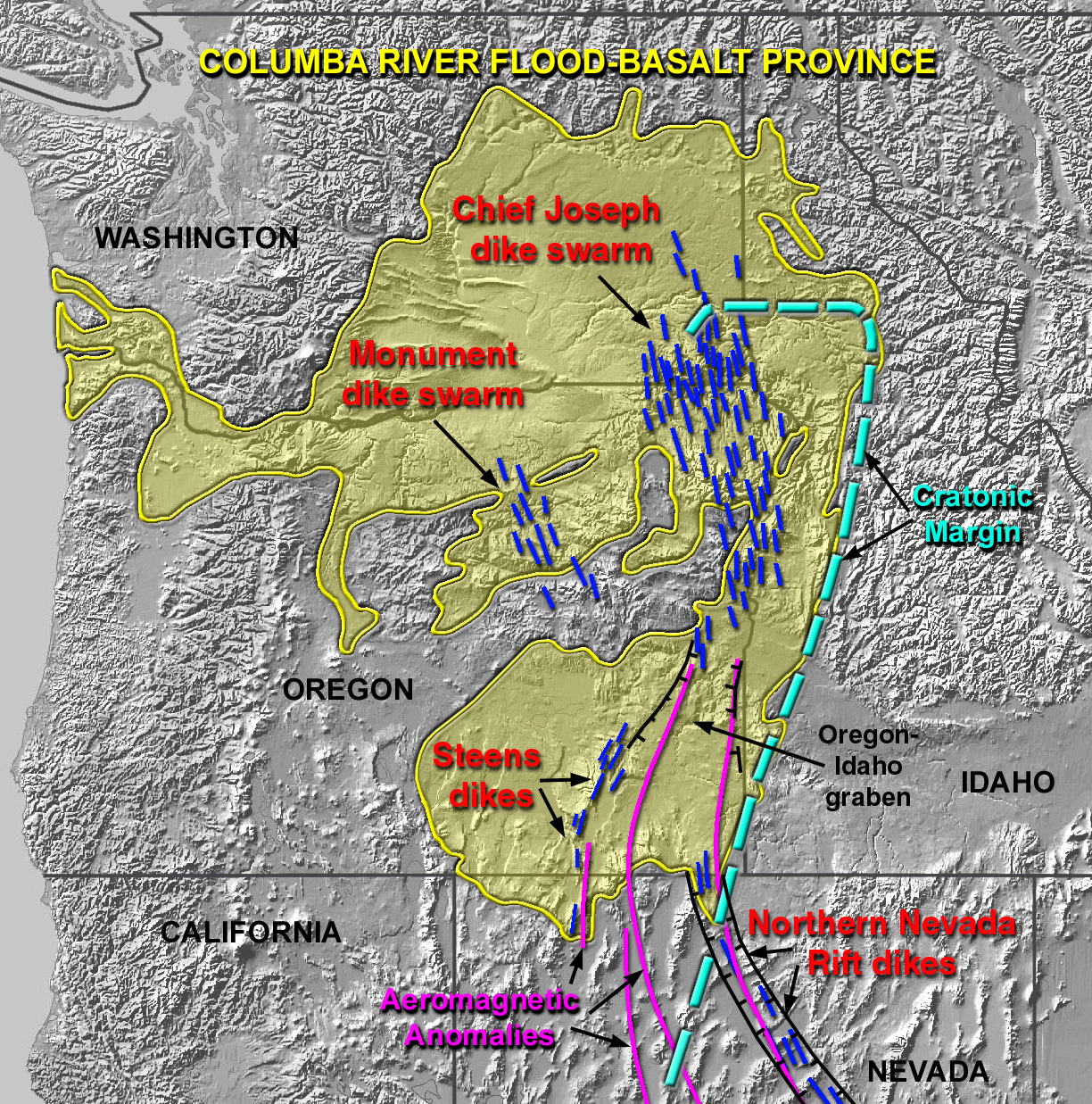
The Columbia River Basalt Group (including the Steen and Picture Gorge basalts) extends over portions of four states.

The Columbia River Basalt Group (CRBG) is the youngest, smallest and one of the best-preserved continental flood basalt provinces on Earth, covering over 210,000 km^{2} (81,000 sq mi) mainly eastern Oregon and Washington, western Idaho, and part of northern Nevada. The basalt group includes the Steens and Picture Gorge basalt formations.

== Introduction ==
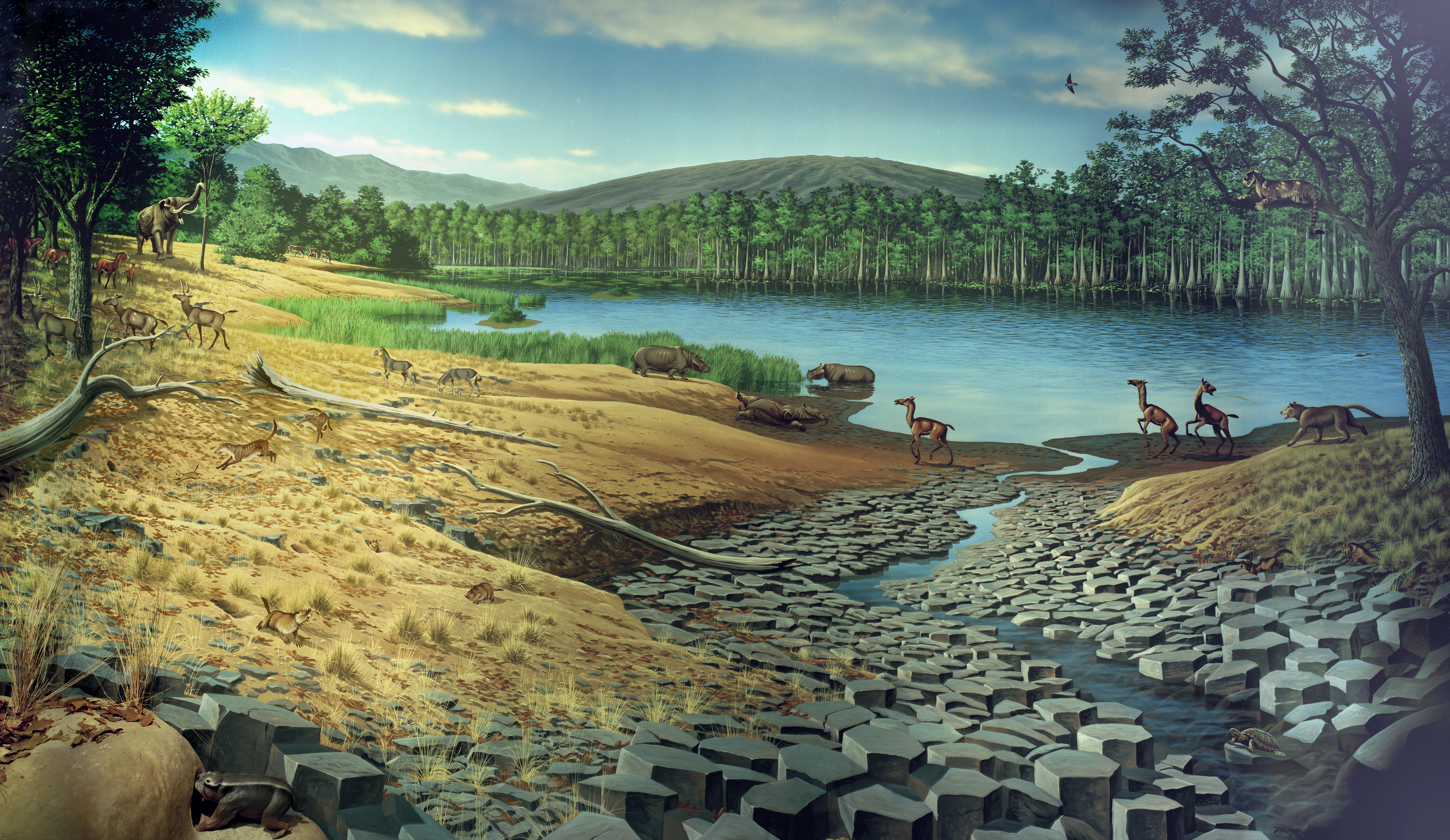
Restoration of Miocene animals at the Picture Gorge Basalts

During the middle to late Miocene epoch, the Columbia River flood basalts engulfed about 163,700 km^{2} (63,200 sq mi) of the Pacific Northwest, forming a large igneous province with an estimated volume of 174,300 km^{3} (41,800 cu mi). Eruptions were most vigorous 17–14 million years ago, when over 99 percent of the basalt was released. Less extensive eruptions continued 14–6 million years ago.

Erosion resulting from the Missoula Floods has extensively exposed these lava flows, laying bare many layers of the basalt flows at Wallula Gap, the lower Palouse River, the Columbia River Gorge and throughout the Channeled Scablands.

The Columbia River Basalt Group is thought to be a potential link to the Chilcotin Group in south-central British Columbia, Canada. The Latah Formation sediments of Washington and Idaho are interbedded with a number of the Columbia River Basalt Group flows, and outcrop across the region.

Absolute dates, subject to a statistical uncertainty, are determined through radiometric dating using isotope ratios such as ^{40}Ar/^{39}Ar dating, which can be used to identify the date of solidifying basalt. In the CRBG deposits ^{40}Ar, which is produced by ^{40}K decay, only accumulates after the melt solidifies.

Other flood basalts include the Deccan Traps (late Cretaceous period), that cover an area of 500,000 km^{2} (190,000 sq mi) in west-central India; the Emeishan Traps (Permian), which cover more than 250,000 km^{2} (97,000 sq mi) in southwestern China; and Siberian Traps (late Permian) that cover 2,000,000 km^{2} (770,000 sq mi) in Russia.

== Formation ==
Some time during a 10–15 million-year period, lava flow after lava flow poured out of multiple dikes which trace along an old fault line running from south-eastern Oregon through to western British Columbia. The many layers of lava eventually reached a thickness of more than 1.8 km (5,900 ft). As the molten rock came to the surface, the Earth's crust gradually sank into the space left by the rising lava. This subsidence of the crust produced a large, slightly depressed lava plain now known as the Columbia Basin or Columbia River Plateau. The northwesterly advancing lava forced the ancient Columbia River into its present course. The lava, as it flowed over the area, first filled the stream valleys, forming dams that in turn caused impoundments or lakes. In these ancient lake beds are found fossil leaf impressions, petrified wood, fossil insects, and bones of vertebrate animals.

In the middle Miocene, 17 to 15 Ma, the Columbia Plateau and the Oregon Basin and Range of the Pacific Northwest were flooded with lava flows. Both flows are similar in composition and age, and have been attributed to a common source, the Yellowstone hotspot. The ultimate cause of the volcanism is still up for debate, but the most widely accepted idea is that the mantle plume or upwelling (similar to that associated with present-day Hawaii) initiated the widespread and voluminous basaltic volcanism about 17 million years ago. As hot mantle plume materials rise and reach lower pressures, the hot materials melt and interact with the materials in the upper mantle, creating magma. Once that magma breaches the surface, it flows as lava and then solidifies into basalt.

=== Transition to flood basalt volcanism ===
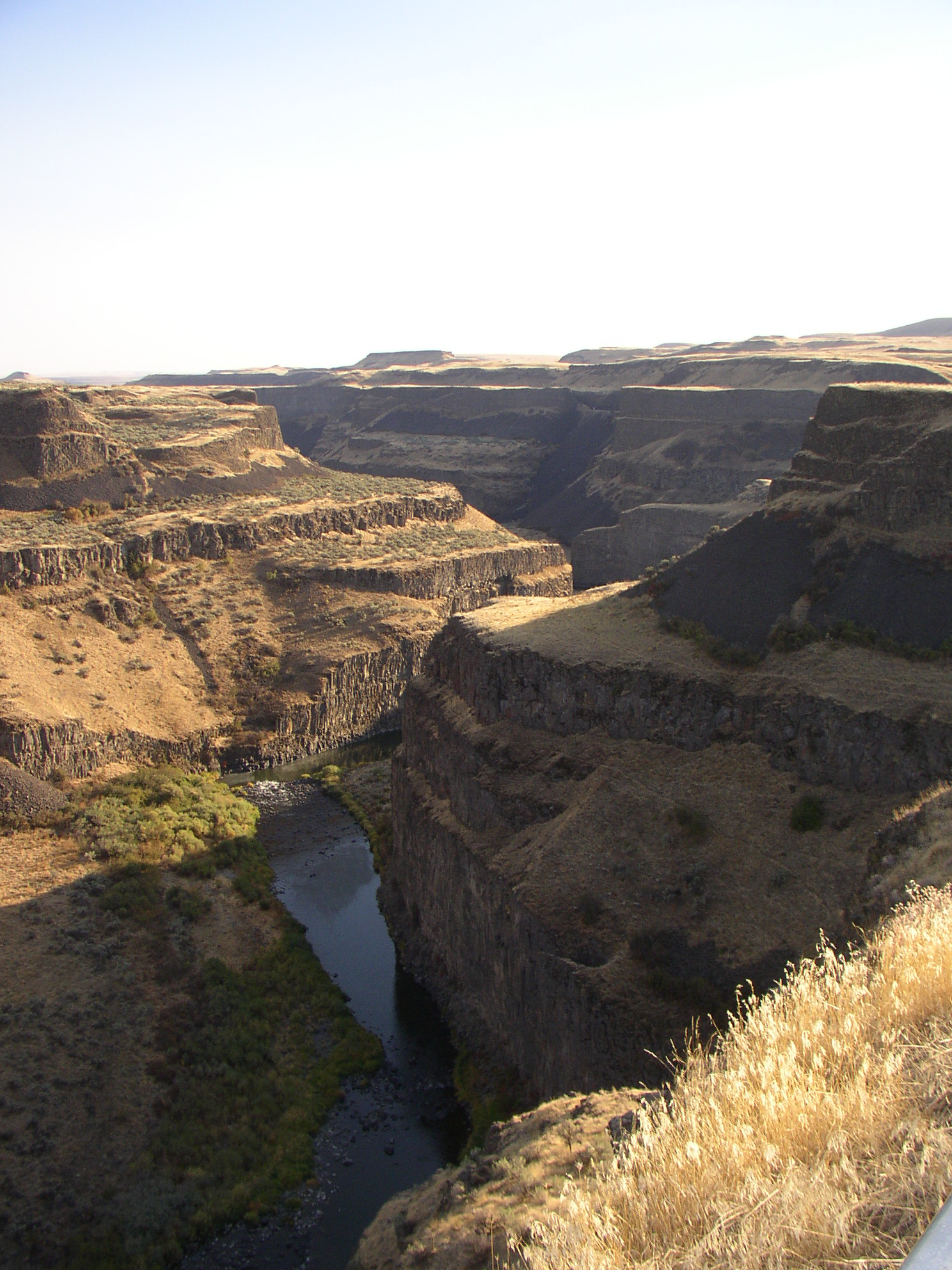
In the Palouse River Canyon just downstream of Palouse Falls, the Sentinel Bluffs flows of the Grand Ronde Formation can be seen on the bottom, covered by the Ginkgo Flow of the Wanapum Basalt.

Prior to 17.5 million years ago, the Western Cascade stratovolcanoes erupted with periodic regularity for over 20 million years, even as they do today. An abrupt transition to shield volcanic flooding took place in the mid-Miocene. The flows can be divided into four major categories: The Steens Basalt, Grande Ronde Basalt, the Wanapum Basalt, and the Saddle Mountains Basalt. The various lava flows have been dated by radiometric dating—particularly through measurement of the ratios of isotopes of potassium to argon. The Columbia River flood basalt province comprises more than 300 individual basalt lava flows that have an average volume of 500 to 600 cubic kilometres (120 to 140 cu mi).

The transition to flood volcanism in the Columbia River Basalt Group (CRBG), similar to other large igneous provinces, was also marked by atmospheric loading through the mass exsolution and emission of volatiles, via the process of volcanic degassing. Comparative analysis of volatile concentrations in source feeder dikes to associated extruded flow units have been quantitatively measured to determine the magnitude of degassing exhibited in CRBG eruptions. Of the more than 300 individual flows associated with the CRBG, the Roza flow contains some of the most chemically well preserved basalts for volatile analysis. Contained within the Wanapum formation, Roza is one of the most extensive members of the CRBG with an area of 40,300 square kilometres and a volume of 1,300 cubic kilometres. With magmatic volatile values assumed at 1 – 1.5 percent by weight concentration for source feeder dikes, the emission of sulfur for the Roza flow is calculated to be on the order of 12Gt (12,000 million tonnes) at a rate of 1.2Gt (1,200 million tonnes) annually, in the form of sulfur dioxide (SO2). However, other research through petrologic analysis has yielded SO2 mass degassing values at 0.12–0.28% of the total erupted mass of the magma, translating to lower emission estimates in the range of 9.2Gt of sulfur dioxide for the Roza flow. Sulfuric acid, a by-product of emitted sulfur dioxide and atmospheric interactions, has been calculated to be 1.7Gt annually for the Roza flow and 17Gt in total. Analysis of glass inclusions within phenocrysts of the basaltic deposits have yielded emission volumes on the magnitude of 310 Mt of hydrochloric acid, and 1.78 Gt of hydrofluoric acid, additionally.

=== Cause of volcanism ===
Major hotspots have often been tracked back to flood-basalt events. In this case the Yellowstone hotspot's initial flood-basalt event occurred near Steens Mountain, when the Imnaha and Steens eruptions began. As the North American Plate moved several centimeters per year westward, the eruptions progressed through the Snake River Plain across Idaho and into Wyoming. Consistent with the hot spot hypothesis, the lava flows are progressively younger as one proceeds east along this path. Previous to this eruptive period, it is believed the Yellowstone Hotspot created features like Smith Rock in Central Oregon and perhaps another flood basalt event known as Siletzia which underlies much of the Pacific Northwest coast with exposures in the Oregon Coast Range.

There is additional confirmation that Yellowstone is associated with a deep hot spot. Using tomographic images based on seismic waves, relatively narrow, deeply seated, active convective plumes have been detected under Yellowstone and several other hot spots. These plumes are much more focused than the upwelling observed with large-scale plate-tectonics circulation.

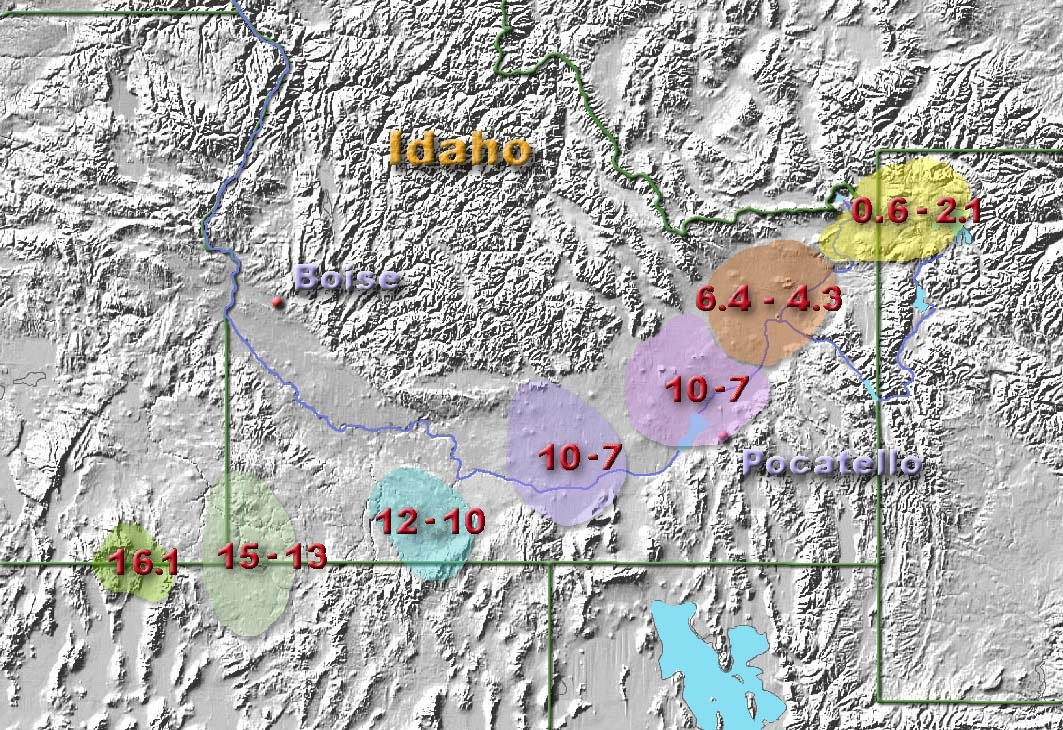
Location of Yellowstone Hotspot in millions of Years Ago

The hot spot hypothesis is not universally accepted, as it has not resolved several questions. The Yellowstone hot spot volcanism track shows a large apparent bow in the hot-spot track that does not correspond to changes in plate motion if the northern CRBG floods are considered. Further, the Yellowstone images show necking of the plume at 650 and 400 km (400 and 250 mi), which may correspond to phase changes or may reflect still-to-be-understood viscosity effects. Additional data collection and further modeling will be required to achieve a consensus on the actual mechanism.

=== Timeframe of basalt emplacement ===
Columnar basaltic joints near Naches, Washington from the Columbia River Basalt

The Columbia River Basalt Group flows exhibit essentially uniform chemical properties through the bulk of individual flows, suggesting rapid placement. Ho and Cashman (1997) characterized the 500 km (310 mi)-long Ginkgo flow of the Frenchman Springs Member, determining that it had been formed in roughly a week, based on the measured melting temperature along the flow from the origin to the most distant point of the flow, combined with hydraulics considerations. The Ginkgo basalt was examined over its 500 km (310 mi) flow path from a Ginkgo flow feeder dike near Kahlotus, Washington to the flow terminus in the Pacific Ocean at Yaquina Head, Oregon. The basalt had an upper melting temperature of 1 095 ± 5 °C and a lower temperature to 1 085 ± 5 °C; this indicates that the maximum temperature drop along the Ginkgo flow was 20 °C. The lava must have spread quickly to achieve this uniformity.

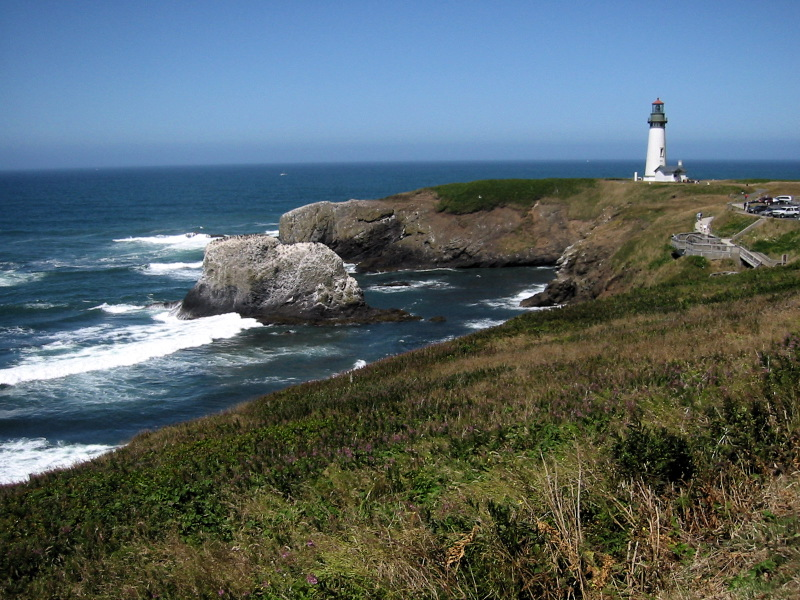
Yaquina Head Lighthouse sits atop erosion-resistant Ginkgo flow basalt of the Frenchman Springs Member over 500 km (310 mi) from its origin.

Analyses indicate that the flow must remain laminar, as turbulent flow would cool more quickly. This could be accomplished by sheet flow, which can travel at velocities of 1 to 8 metres per second (2.2 to 17.9 mph) without turbulence and minimal cooling, suggesting that the Ginkgo flow occurred in less than a week. The cooling/hydraulics analyses are supported by an independent indicator; if longer periods were required, external water from temporarily dammed rivers would intrude, resulting in both more dramatic cooling rates and increased volumes of pillow lava. Ho's analysis is consistent with the analysis by Reidel, Tolan, & Beeson (1994), who proposed a maximum Pomona flow emplacement duration of several months based on the time required for rivers to be reestablished in their canyons following a basalt flow interruption.

Later research from Vye-Brown, C and colleagues (2013) argues that emplacement of the Ginkgo basalt was done during a much longer timeframe. Their argument suggests that initial emplacement was the result of inflation which produced thick lobes. These lobes allowed lava to transfer to new lobes. The Minimum total emplacement happened in no less than 8.3 years.

=== Dating of the flood basalt flows ===
Three major tools are used to date the CRBG flows: Stratigraphy, radiometric dating, and magnetostratigraphy. These techniques have been key to correlating data from disparate basalt exposures and boring samples over five states.

Major eruptive pulses of flood basalt lavas are laid down stratigraphically. The layers can be distinguished by physical characteristics and chemical composition. Each distinct layer is typically assigned a name usually based on area (valley, mountain, or region) where that formation is exposed and available for study. Stratigraphy provides a relative ordering (ordinal ranking) of the CRBG layers.

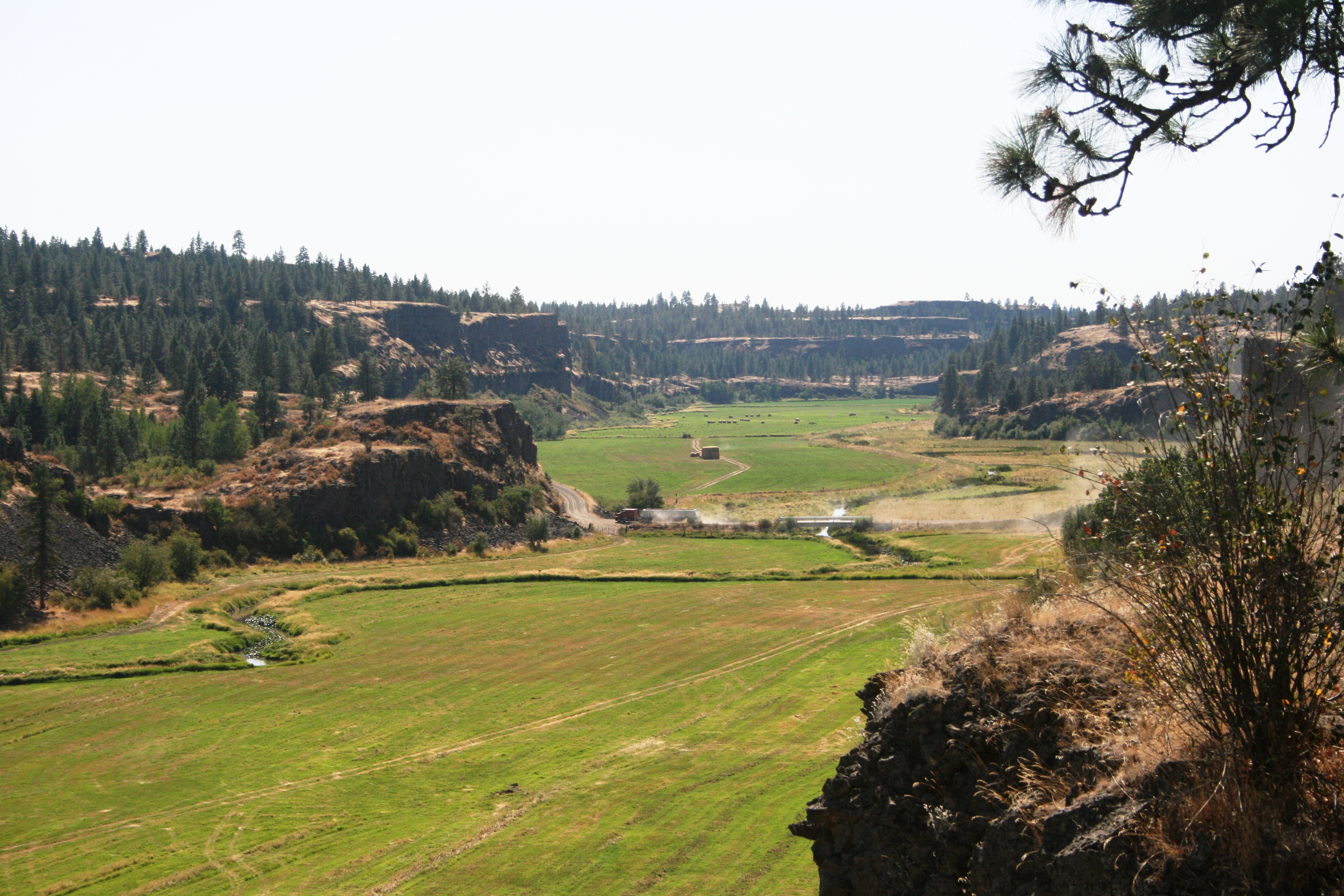
Looking south in Hole in the Ground Coulee, Washington. The upper basalt is a Priest Rapids Member flow lying above a Roza Member flow, while the lower canyon exposes a layer of Grand Ronde basalt.

Absolute dates, subject to a statistical uncertainty, are determined through radiometric dating using isotope ratios such as ^{40}Ar/^{39}Ar dating, which can be used to identify the date of solidifying basalt. In the CRBG deposits ^{40}Ar, which is produced by ^{40}K decay, only accumulates after the melt solidifies.

Magnetostratigraphy is also used to determine age. This technique uses the pattern of magnetic polarity zones of CRBG layers by comparison to the magnetic polarity timescale. The samples are analyzed to determine their characteristic remanent magnetization from the Earth's magnetic field at the time a stratum was deposited. This is possible because, as magnetic minerals precipitate in the melt (crystallize), they align themselves with Earth's current magnetic field.

The Steens Basalt captured a highly detailed record of the Earth's magnetic reversal that occurred roughly 15 million years ago. Over a 10,000-year period, more than 130 flows solidified – roughly one flow every 75 years. As each flow cooled below about 500 °C (932 °F), it captured the magnetic field's orientation-normal, reversed, or in one of several intermediate positions. Most of the flows froze with a single magnetic orientation. However, several of the flows, which freeze from both the upper and lower surfaces, progressively toward the center, captured substantial variations in magnetic field direction as they froze. The observed change in direction was reported as 50⁰ over 15 days.

== Major flows ==
=== Steens Basalt ===
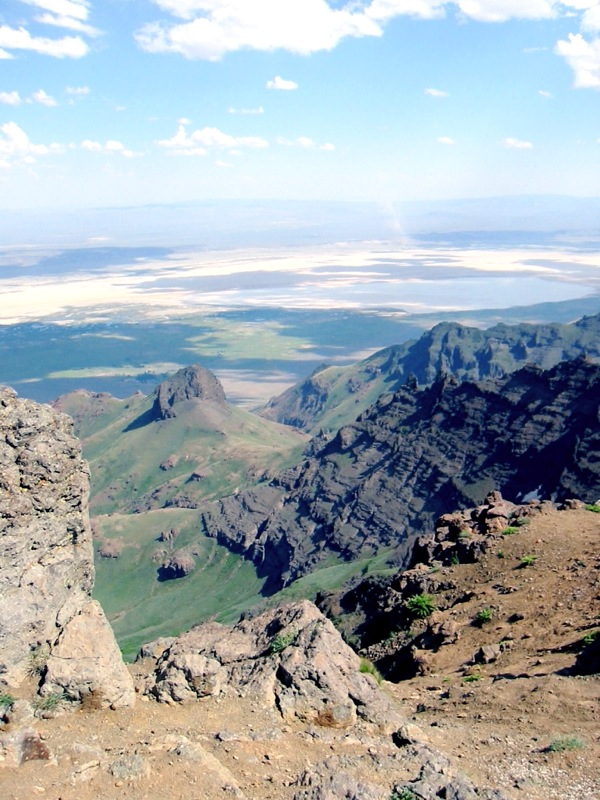
View from the top of Steens Mountain, looking out to Alvord Desert with basalt layers visible on the eroded face.

The Steens Basalt flows covered about 50,000 km^{2} (19,000 sq mi) of the Oregon Plateau in sections up to 1 km (3,300 ft) thick. It contains the earliest identified eruption of the CRBG large igneous province. The type locality for the Steens basalt, which covers a large portion of the Oregon Plateau, is an approximately 1,000 m (3,300 ft) face of Steens Mountain showing multiple layers of basalt. The oldest of the flows considered part of the Columbia River Basalt Group, the Steens basalt, includes flows geographically separated but roughly concurrent with the Imnaha flows. Older Imnaha basalt north of Steens Mountain overlies the chemically distinct lowermost flows of Steens basalt; hence some flows of the Imnaha are stratigraphically younger than the lowermost Steens basalt.

One geomagnetic field reversal occurred during the Steens Basalt eruptions at approximately 16.7 Ma, as dated using ^{40}Ar/^{39}Ar ages and the geomagnetic polarity timescale. Steens Mountain and related sections of Oregon Plateau flood basalts at Catlow Peak and Poker Jim Ridge 70 to 90 km (43 to 56 mi) to the southeast and west of Steens Mountain, provide the most detailed magnetic field reversal data (reversed-to-normal polarity transition) yet reported in volcanic rocks.

The observed trend in feeder dike swarms associated with the Steens Basalt flow are considered to be atypical of other dike swarm trends associated with the CRBG. These swarms, characterized by a maintained trend of N20°E, trace the northward continuation of the Nevada shear zone and have been attributed to magmatic rise through this zone on a regional scale.

=== Imnaha Basalt ===
Virtually coeval with the oldest of the flows, the Imnaha basalt flows welled up across northeastern Oregon. There were 26 major flows over the period, one roughly every 15,000 years. Although estimates are that this amounts to about 10% of the total flows, they have been buried under more recent flows, and are visible in few locations. They can be seen along the lower benches of the Imnaha River and Snake River in Wallowa County.

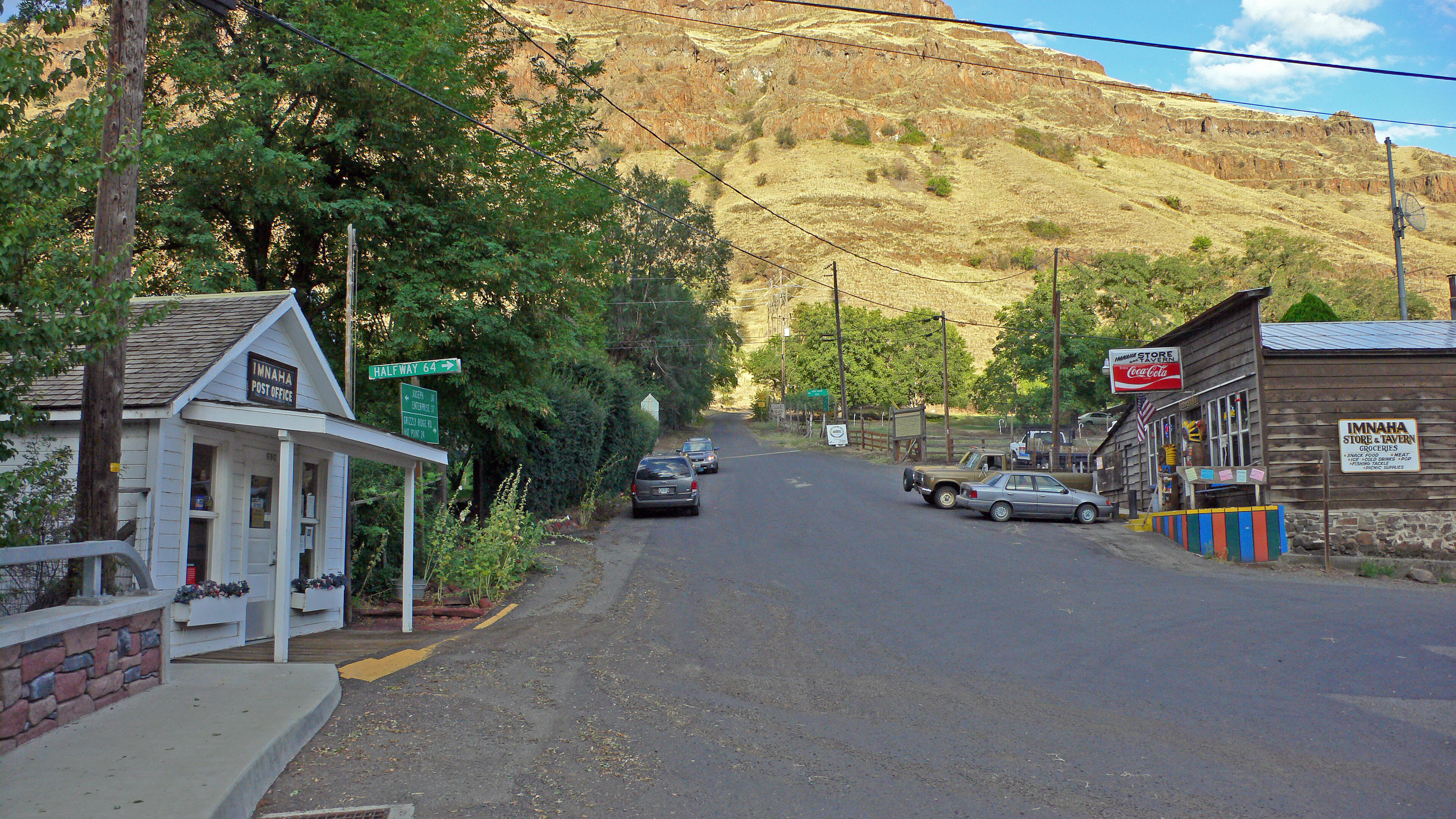
The second oldest flows, the Imnaha Basalt, are exposed at the type locality: Imnaha, Oregon.

The Imnaha lavas have been dated using the K–Ar technique, and show a broad range of dates. The oldest is 17.67±0.32 Ma with younger lava flows ranging to 15.50±0.40 Ma. Although the Imnaha Basalt overlies Lower Steens Basalt, it has been suggested that it is interfingered with Upper Steens Basalt.

=== Grande Ronde Basalt ===
The next oldest of the flows, from 17 million to 15.6 million years ago, make up the Grande Ronde Basalt. Units (flow zones) within the Grande Ronde Basalt include the Meyer Ridge and the Sentinel Bluffs units. Geologists estimate that the Grande Ronde Basalt comprises about 85 percent of the total flow volume. It is characterized by a number of dikes called the Chief Joseph Dike Swarm near Joseph, Enterprise, Troy and Walla Walla through which the lava upwelling occurred (estimates range to up to 20,000 such dikes). Many of the dikes were fissures 5 to 10 m (16 to 33 ft) wide and up to 10 miles (16 km) in length, allowing for huge quantities of magma upwelling. Much of the lava flowed north into Washington as well as down the Columbia River channel to the Pacific Ocean; the tremendous flows created the Columbia River Plateau. The weight of this flow (and the emptying of the underlying magma chamber) caused central Washington to sink, creating the broad Columbia Basin in Washington. The type locality for the formation is the canyon of the Grande Ronde River. Grande Ronde basalt flows and dikes can also be seen in the exposed 2,000-foot (610 m) walls of Joseph Canyon along Oregon Route 3.

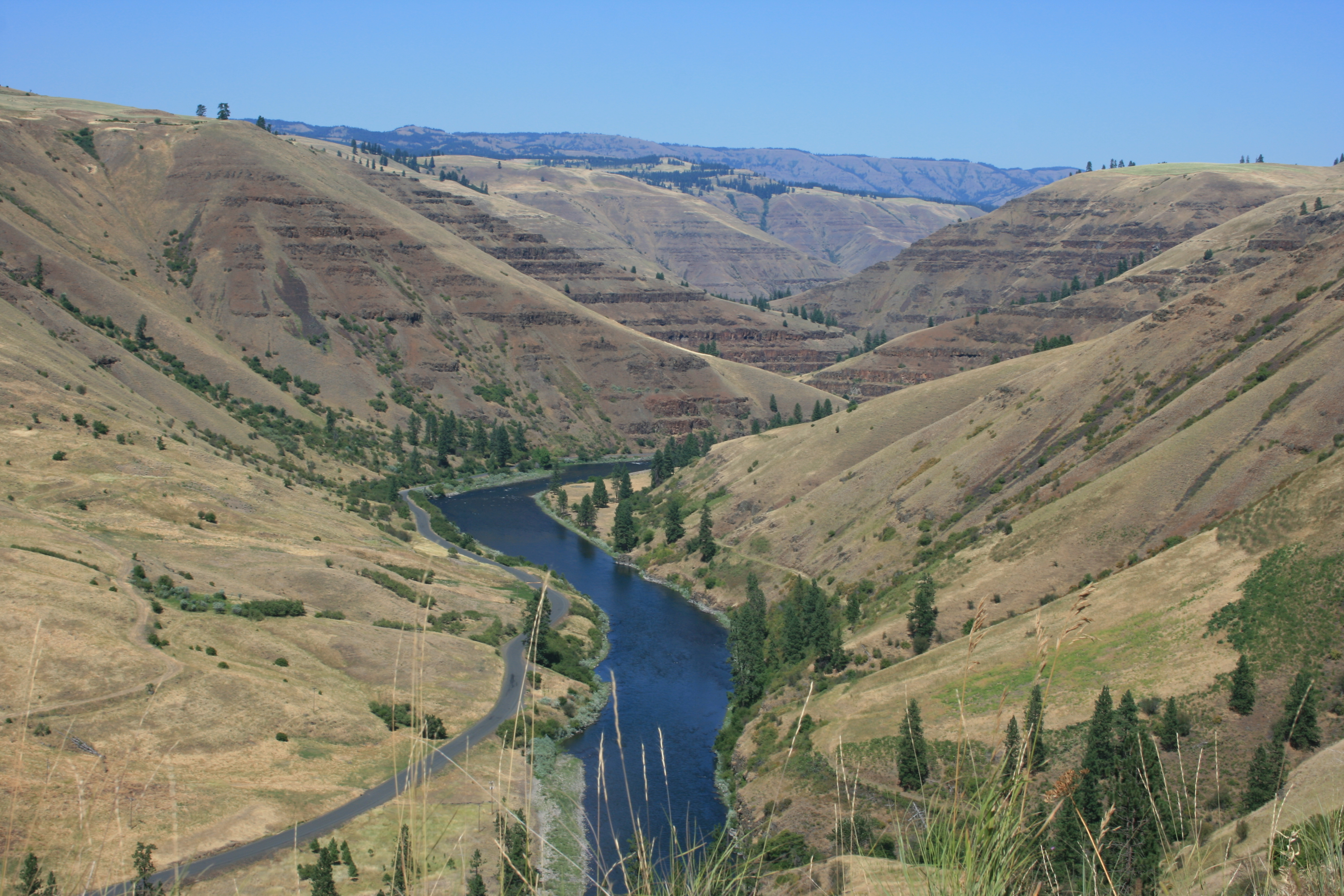
The type locality for the Grande Ronde Basalt lies along the lower Grande Ronde as shown here.

The Grande Ronde basalt flows flooded down the ancestral Columbia River channel to the west of the Cascade Mountains. It can be found exposed along the Clackamas River and at Silver Falls State Park where the falls plunge over multiple layers of the Grande Ronde basalt. Evidence of eight flows can be found in the Tualatin Mountains on the west side of Portland.

Individual flows included large quantities of basalt. The McCoy Canyon flow of the Sentinel Bluffs Member released 4,278 km^{3} (1,026 cu mi) of basalt in layers of 10 to 60 m (33 to 197 ft) in thickness. The Umtanum flow has been estimated at 2,750 km^{3} (660 cu mi) in layers 50 m (160 ft) deep. The Pruitt Draw flow of the Teepee Butte Member released about 2,350 km^{3} (560 cu mi) with layers of basalt up to 100 m (330 ft) thick.

=== Wanapum Basalt ===
The Wanapum Basalt is made up of the Eckler Mountain Member (15.6 million years ago), the Frenchman Springs Member (15.5 million years ago), the Roza Member (14.9 million years ago) and the Priest Rapids Member (14.5 million years ago). They originated from vents between Pendleton, Oregon and Hanford, Washington.

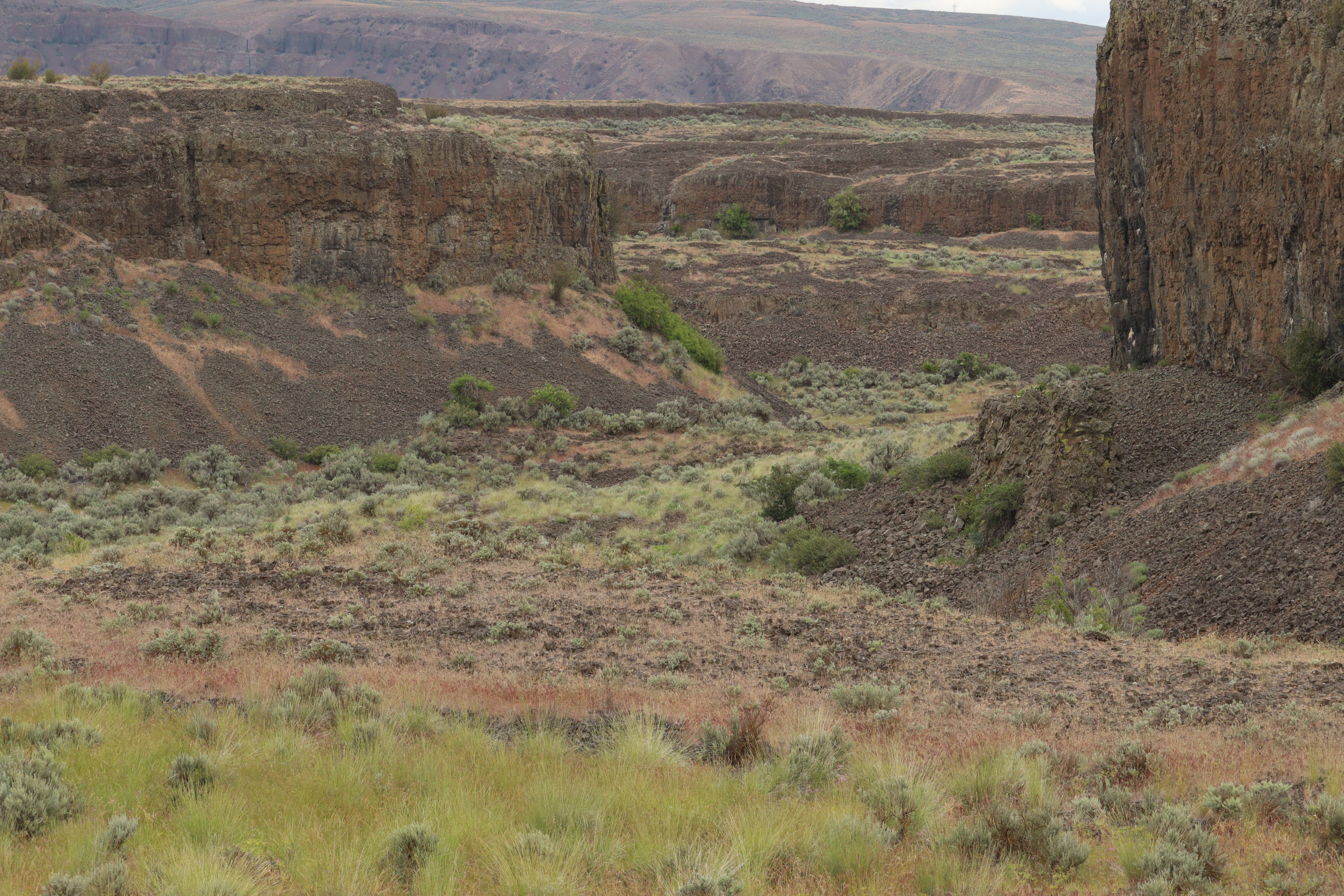
Priest Rapids Member exposed on the walls of Park Lake Side Canyon

The Frenchman Springs Member flowed along similar paths as the Grande Ronde basalts, but can be identified by different chemical characteristics. It flowed west to the Pacific, and can be found in the Columbia Gorge, along the upper Clackamas River, the hills south of Oregon City, and as far west as Yaquina Head near Newport, Oregon – a distance of 750 km (470 mi).

=== Saddle Mountains Basalt ===
The Saddle Mountains Basalt, seen prominently at the Saddle Mountains, is made up of the Umatilla Member flows, the Wilbur Creek Member flows, the Asotin Member flows (13 million years ago), the Weissenfels Ridge Member flows, the Esquatzel Member flows, the Elephant Mountain Member flows (10.5 million years ago), the Bujford Member flows, the Ice Harbor Member flows (8.5 million years ago) and the Lower Monumental Member flows (6 million years ago).

== Related geologic structures ==
=== Oregon High Lava Plains ===
Camp & Ross (2004) observed that the Oregon High Lava Plains is a complementary system of propagating rhyolite eruptions, with the same point of origin. The two phenomena occurred concurrently, with the High Lava Plains propagating westward since ~10 Ma, while the Snake River Plains propagated eastward.

== See also ==
- Grand Coulee
- Channeled scablands
- Wallula Gap
- Interior Plateau
- Basin and Range Province

== Sources ==
- Alt, David (2001). Glacial Lake Missoula & Its Humongous Floods. Mountain Press Publishing Company. ISBN 978-0-87842-415-3.
- Alt, David; Hyndman, Donald (1995). Northwest Exposures: a Geologic Story of the Northwest. Mountain Press Publishing Company. ISBN 978-0-87842-323-1. Not WP:RS.
- Appenzeller, Tim (3 January 1992). "A Conundrum at Steens Mountain". Science. 255 (5040): 31–51. doi:10.1126/science.255.5040.31. PMID 17739912.
- Barry, T. L.; Self, S.; Kelley, S. P.; Reidel, S.; Hooper, P.; Widdowson, M. (2010). "New 40Ar/39Ar dating of the Grande Ronde lavas, Columbia River Basalts, USA: Implications for duration of flood basalt eruption episodes" (PDF). Lithos. 118 (3–4): 213–222. Bibcode:2010Litho.118..213B. doi:10.1016/j.lithos.2010.03.014.
- Bishop, Ellen Morris (2003). In Search of Ancient Oregon: A geological and natural history. Portland, OR: Timber Press. ISBN 978-0-88192-789-4.
- Bjornstad, Bruce (2006). On the Trail of the Ice Age Floods: A Geological Guide to the Mid-Columbia Basin. Sand Point, ID: Keokee Books. ISBN 978-1-879628-27-4.
- Bryan, S.E.; Peate, I.U.; Peate, D.W.; Self, S.; Jerram, D.A.; Mawby, M.R.; Marsh, J.S.; Miller, J.A. (21 July 2010). "The largest volcanic eruptions on Earth" (PDF). Earth-Science Reviews. 102 (3–4): 207–229. Bibcode:2010ESRv..102..207B. doi:10.1016/j.earscirev.2010.07.001.
- Camp, Victor E.; Ross, Martin E. (2004). "Mantle dynamics and genesis of mafic magmatism in the intermontane Pacific Northwest". Journal of Geophysical Research. 109 (B08204) 2003JB002838. Bibcode:2004JGRB..109.8204C. doi:10.1029/2003JB002838.
- Camp, V.E.; Ross, M.E.; Hanson, W.E. (January 2003). "Genesis of flood basalts and Basin and Range volcanic rocks from Steens Mountain to the Malheur River Gorge, Oregon". GSA Bulletin. 115 (1): 105–128. Bibcode:2003GSAB..115..105C. doi:10.1130/0016-7606(2003)115<0105:GOFBAB>2.0.CO;2. ISSN 0016-7606.
- Carson, Robert J.; Pogue, Kevin R. (1996). Flood Basalts and Glacier Floods: Roadside Geology of Parts of Walla Walla, Franklin, and Columbia Counties, Washington (Report). Washington Division of Geology and Earth Resources Information Circular. Vol. 90. Olympia, WA: Washington State Department of Natural Resources.
- Carson, Robert J.; Denny, Michael E.; Dickson, Catherine E.; Dodd, Lawrence L.; Edwards, G. Thomas (2008). Where the Great River Bends: A natural and human history of the Columbia at Wallula. Sandpoint, ID: Keokee Books. ISBN 978-1-879628-32-8.
- Ho, Anita M.; Cashman, Katharine V. (1997). "Temperature constraints on the Ginkgo flow of the Columbia River Basalt Group". Geology. 25 (5): 403–406. Bibcode:1997Geo....25..403H. doi:10.1130/0091-7613(1997)025<0403:TCOTGF>2.3.CO;2.
- Humphreys, Eugene; Schmandt, Brandon (2011). "Looking for mantle plumes". Physics Today. 64 (8): 34. Bibcode:2011PhT....64h..34H. doi:10.1063/PT.3.1217.
- Jarboe, Nicholas A.; Coe, Robert; Glen, Jonathan M.G. (2011). "Evidence from lava flows for complex polarity transitions: the new composite Steens Mountain reversal record". Geophysical Journal International. 186 (2): 580–602. Bibcode:2011GeoJI.186..580J. doi:10.1111/j.1365-246X.2011.05086.x.
- Jarboe, N.A.; Coe, R.S.; Renne, P.R.; Glen, J.M.G.; Mankinen, E.A. (2008). "Quickly erupted volcanic sections of the Steens Basalt, Columbia River Basalt Group: Secular variation, tectonic rotation, and the Steens Mountain reversal". Geochemistry, Geophysics, Geosystems. 9 (Q11010) 2008GC002067: n/a. Bibcode:2008GGG.....911010J. doi:10.1029/2008GC002067.
- Mueller, Marge; Mueller, Ted (1997). Fire, Faults & Floods: A road & trail guide exploring the origins of the Columbia River Basin. Moscow, ID: University of Idaho Press. ISBN 978-0-89301-206-9.
- Reidel, S.P.; Tolan, T.L.; Beeson, M.H. (1994). Swanson, D.A.; Haugerud, R.A. (eds.). Factors that influenced the eruptive and emplacement histories of flood basalt flows: A field guide to selected vents and flows of the Columbia River Basalt Group. Geologic Field Trips in the Pacific Northwest. Vol. V. Seattle, WA: University of Washington. pp. 1–18.
- Reidel, Stephen P. (January 2005). "A lava flow without a source: The Cohasset flow and its compositional members". Journal of Geology. 113 (1): 1–21. Bibcode:2005JG....113....1R. doi:10.1086/425966. S2CID 12587046.
