= Portland–Seattle rivalry =

Rivalry between the U.S. cities of Portland, Oregon and Seattle, Washington

The United States West Coast cities of Seattle, Washington and Portland, Oregon have a city rivalry going back over a century. According to various authors, the Portland–Seattle city rivalry is comparable to that of Charlotte and Atlanta, Cincinnati and Columbus, Cleveland and Pittsburgh, San Antonio and Austin, St. Louis and Chicago, or San Francisco and Los Angeles. Bases for competition include city sports teams, food and drink, regional economic dominance, and even preference for local volcanoes. (Note: CNN pitted Seattle against Portland in a 2012 city rivalries report, in which the Seattle correspondent extolled the virtues of 14,410 foot Mount Rainier on the Seattle skyline over Portland's much smaller Mount Hood. Portland's correspondent claimed Portland's lack of a sales tax made it a better shopping destination.)

== 19th century origins ==
=== Maritime trade ===
The West Coast's 19th-century economy was initially based on maritime trade, at first dominated by sailing ships with the San Francisco–East Coast trade, but then joined by Portland and Seattle as they began to develop their own regional resources and contribute to a national economic network, with "intercity rivalry on the Pacific Coast [that] mirrored rivalries that had grown between other groups of cities at earlier dates" such as Boston, Philadelphia and New York.

=== Railroads ===
The advent of transcontinental rail transportation completed the break from San Francisco's dominance and strengthened the economic rivalry between Portland and Seattle:

[D]uring the last two decades of the nineteenth century Seattle and Portland merchants took over most of the trade with the interior of the Pacific Northwest. With the completion of the Northern Pacific and Great Northern Railroads, the businessmen of the two cities extended their reach into the countryside ... As they broke the hold of San Franciscans over the Pacific Northwest, Seattle and Portland business leaders came into conflict with each other. Portland merchants viewed Seattleites as brash upstarts invading what should be their natural trade territory -- most of the Pacific Northwest, including eastern Washington.

— Mansel G. Blackford, The Lost Dream: Businessmen and City Planning on the Pacific Coast, 1890-1920

The Portland Oregonian newspaper compared Seattle unfavorably to a peaceful Portland when anti-Chinese riots erupted in the 1880s. Portland prided itself as a "model of civility and culture" based on "slow but steady growth" compared to Seattle.

If Portland was a transplanted New England dowager, Seattle was a rambunctious frontiersman who grew rich through a combination of drive, optimism, wit, and occasional good fortune.

— G. Thomas Edwards, Experiences in a Promised Land: Essays in Pacific Northwest History

Cultural institutions and physical infrastructure like paved streets and electrification were built by each city in conscious competition with the other.

== 20th century ==
A work published in 1920 cited the Seattle–Portland rivalry as a "well known" intercity rivalry in a chapter on sectional rivalry in the American West, putting it alongside Minneapolis-St. Paul, Dallas-Fort Worth and San Francisco-Los Angeles.

=== Sports teams ===
Twentieth-century sports team rivalries between the two cities include the Portland Trail Blazers–Seattle SuperSonics basketball rivalry (until the Sonics left Seattle in 2008), and the Portland Timbers–Seattle Sounders rivalry, called by one writer "America's best soccer rivalry".

=== Urban expansion and growth ===
A scholarly book on the growth of the American West stated "Examination of urban growth in the Pacific Northwest confirms that urban rivalry remains a fruitful topic for historians ..."

== 21st century ==
=== Hipster culture ===
Local and national media frequently compare the hipster culture of the two cities. A Slate piece examined how the 2010s comedy television show Portlandia exposed the divide in Seattle and Portland's hipster culture.

=== Cuisine ===
Seattle and Portland have a competitive food culture, with local pride taken in the superiority of each city's beer and brew pubs, donuts, and street food including food trucks.

According to Seattle Metropolitan magazine, "Portland's long been known as the tiny-restaurant innovator, Seattle the land of the big boys."

=== Drug laws ===
After marijuana legalization in both states (via I-502 in Washington and Measure 91 in Oregon) a 2015 Stranger magazine cover story worried that "Washington's pot connoisseurs might [start] smoking Oregon marijuana" and "savvy marijuana tourists will be going to Portland instead of Seattle". (Note: The above-the-fold cover blurb was "Oregon's laws are better than ours")

=== Sports teams ===
The 2013 start of the National Women's Soccer League (NWSL) introduced new teams in both cities, and in 2022 the Portland Thorns-Seattle Reign rivalry was called "the NWSL's biggest rivalry" by Sports Illustrated writer Molly Geary.
