= Points per game =

Sports term

Points per game, often abbreviated PPG, is the average number of points scored by a player or team per game played in a sport, over the course of a series of games, a whole season, or a career. It is calculated by dividing the total number of points by number of games. The terminology is often used in basketball and ice hockey.

For description of sports points see points for ice hockey or points for basketball.

== Calculation and usefulness ==
In games divided into fixed time periods, especially those in which a player may exit and re-enter the game multiple or an unlimited number of times, a player may receive the same credit (in this context, a liability) for participation in a game regardless of how long (i.e., for what portion of the game clock's elapsing) they were actually on the field or court.

For this reason, the points-per-game statistic may understate the contribution of players who are highly effective but used only in certain specific "pinch" or "clutch" scenarios, such that a points-per-unit-time figure (e.g., "points per 48 minutes" in the case of professional basketball) may better represent their effectiveness within the context in which a coach or manager plays them.

Although the points-per-game statistic has the advantage of factoring in the breadth of scenarios in which the player is effective, in that a player effective in many different scenarios will play more minutes per game and therefore contribute more to the team's overall performance, it still fails to distinguish between an ineffective player, an effective "pinch"/"clutch" offensive player, and a player assuming a primarily defensive role in a position whose title does not necessarily make the nature of their role obvious (e.g., basketball forward and star rebounder Dennis Rodman).

== Association football ==
PPG has also been used as an alternative method for ranking association football teams, particularly during the COVID-19 pandemic, as a way to better compare performance when there is a differential in matches played (and thus traditional point-scoring is unsuitable). Major League Soccer used it to decide the standings for the 2020 season, as some teams had played as little as 15 of their planned 23 regular season matches.
