= I-5 rivalry =

National Basketball Association rivalry

- Teams: Portland Trail Blazers; Seattle SuperSonics
- First meeting: October 23, 1970; SuperSonics 141, Trail Blazers 111
- Latest meeting: March 24, 2008; SuperSonics 97, Trail Blazers 84

Statistics
- Total meetings: 192
- All-time series: SuperSonics, 106–102
- Regular season series: SuperSonics, 98–94
- Postseason results: Tied, 8–8
- Longest win streak: SuperSonics, 9 (1971–1972)

Postseason history
- 1978 Western Conference Semifinals: SuperSonics won, 4–2; 1980 Western Conference First Round: SuperSonics won, 2–1; 1983 Western Conference First Round: Trail Blazers won, 2–0; 1991 Western Conference First Round: Trail Blazers won, 3–2

The I-5 rivalry was a National Basketball Association (NBA) rivalry between the Portland Trail Blazers and the Seattle SuperSonics. The two Pacific Northwest cities are 180 miles (290 km) apart and connected by Interstate 5. The rivalry ended in 2008 when the SuperSonics were relocated to Oklahoma City and became the Thunder.

On July 18, 2006, after unsuccessful efforts to persuade Washington state government officials to provide funding to update the SuperSonics' KeyArena, Howard Schultz and Basketball Club of Seattle LLP sold the SuperSonics and their sister team, the Women's National Basketball Association's Seattle Storm for $350 million to Professional Basketball Club LLC (PBC), an investment group that was headed by Oklahoma City businessman Clay Bennett. On April 18, 2008, NBA owners approved a potential SuperSonics' relocation to Oklahoma City in a 28–2 vote by the league's Board of Governors; only Mark Cuban of the Dallas Mavericks and Paul Allen of the Trail Blazers voted against the move. The approval meant the SuperSonics would be allowed to move to Oklahoma City's Ford Center for the 2008–09 season after reaching a settlement with the city of Seattle.

Seattle and Portland have had rivalries based on various sports teams. Of the five major sports leagues in North America, the two cities each currently have franchises in Major League Soccer with the Timbers and the Sounders, which have played annually since the Timbers joined MLS in 2011. Previously, the two cities had various incarnations of the current professional franchises in leagues such as the North American Soccer League and USL. The top women's soccer league in the U.S., the NWSL, features a rivalry between the Seattle Reign and Portland Thorns. Additionally, the Oregon–Washington football rivalry is one of the most played rivalries in NCAA Division I FBS history, and has been played regularly since 1900.

== History ==
=== Early years ===
The first meeting between the Trail Blazers and SuperSonics occurred on September 30, 1970, in a pre-season exhibition game held at the W. F. West High School gymnasium in Chehalis, Washington, midway between Portland and Seattle. The teams were immediately projected to be rivals, owing to the close proximity and existing rivalry between the Pacific Northwest cities. The Trail Blazers were a new expansion team for 1970, while the SuperSonics began play three seasons earlier in 1967.

=== 1977–1979 NBA Finals ===
In 1976–1977, with a 49–33 record, the Trail Blazers reached the playoffs for the first time in franchise history and proceeded to stampede through the postseason. By the time the Blazers had made it to the 1977 NBA Finals, the city of Portland was in the grips of "Blazermania". After losing the first two games of the championship series at the Spectrum against the Philadelphia 76ers, the Trail Blazers won four in a row to bring the trophy to Portland. The championship capped the team's first winning season.

The following season, the Blazers looked like favorites to repeat. The team started with 50 wins in their first 60 games, but due to star center Bill Walton's foot injury, they only managed to go 8–14 the rest of the way. The Blazers still led the league with a franchise-best 58–24 record, earning a first-round bye in the 1978 NBA Playoffs. However, they were defeated by their Pacific Northwest rivals, the Seattle SuperSonics, four games to two. The SuperSonics started 1977–78 with a 5–17 record, but the season turned around when they hired former coach Lenny Wilkens back. The team won 11 of their first 12 games under Wilkens and finished with 47 wins, qualifying for the second straight playoffs. After defeating the Blazers in the Semifinals, the Sonics beat the Nuggets in six games in the Western Conference Finals. They would end up losing in seven games to the Washington Bullets in the 1978 NBA Finals before returning to the 1979 NBA Finals and defeating the Washington Bullets in five games for their first and only NBA title while in Seattle. For Portland, the 1978 playoffs was the last hurrah for the 1977 championship core. After problems with various injuries and a clash with the team's medical doctors, Bill Walton sat out the 1978–1979 season and then was signed by the San Diego Clippers in the off-season, while his "enforcer" and co-star, Maurice Lucas, was traded to the New Jersey Nets during the 1979–80 season.

=== 1990s: NBA Finals appearances ===
In the 1980s, both teams remained competitive, but were mostly playoff fodder. The Sonics made the playoff seven times in the decade, reaching the conference finals twice (both losses to the Lakers). The Blazers made the playoffs nine times, only missing out in the 1981–82 season. In those nine years, the Blazers made it out the first round just twice.

When the calendar turned to the 1990s, so did both teams as NBA Finals contenders. Along the way, the Blazers built a core that would turn the team into title contenders, adding Clyde Drexler, Terry Porter and Jerome Kersey through the draft while signing or trading for players such as Buck Williams and Kevin Duckworth. Like Walton a decade prior, center Sam Bowie had his once-promising career curtailed by a series of leg injuries after being drafted second overall in the 1984 NBA draft, one pick before Michael Jordan. In the 1989–90 season, Trail Blazers surprised the NBA by posting a 59–23 record, good enough for the third seed in the Western Conference. In the playoffs, they swept the Dallas Mavericks in the first round, defeated the San Antonio Spurs in seven games during the second round, and eliminated the Phoenix Suns in six games in the conference finals. However, they were defeated in the 1990 NBA Finals by the Detroit Pistons in five games.

In 1990–91, the Blazers had an even better regular season record at 63–19, highlighted by a 27–3 start to the season. In the Western Conference First Round of the 1991 NBA playoffs, awaiting the Blazers were the 8th–seeded Seattle SuperSonics, a team that featured All-Star guard Ricky Pierce, Eddie Johnson, and second-year star Shawn Kemp. The Trail Blazers won the first two games over the SuperSonics at home at the Memorial Coliseum, but then lost the next two games at the Seattle Center Coliseum. With the series tied at 2–2, the Trail Blazers won Game 5 over the SuperSonics at the Memorial Coliseum, 119–107, to win in a hard-fought five-game series. This would ultimately be the last playoff series between the two franchises until the Sonics moved to Oklahoma City in 2008. Portland was unable to make repeat Finals appearances in 1991 after being upset by the Los Angeles Lakers in six games. They returned to the Finals again the next season, but became the second victim of the Bulls' first three-peat. To date, 1992 represents Portland's last Finals appearance. They returned to the Conference Finals in 2000, but lost to a Shaquille O'Neal and Kobe Bryant led Lakers squad in seven games.

Just as the Blazers championship window was closing, the Sonics run of success was just opening. In 1993–94, coming off nearly making the Finals in 1992–93, they would have their own 63–19 regular season record. They were led by head coach George Karl and the duo Kemp and Gary Payton, the latter who had been on the team since 1990 but struggled in his first two seasons in the NBA. Kemp was named to the All-NBA Second Team, while Payton was named to the All-NBA Third Team, and to the NBA All-Defensive First Team. Rounding out the roster was 2-time Sixth Man of the Year Detlef Schrempf, Kendall Gill, Ricky Pierce, Sam Perkins, Vincent Askew, and defensive sixth man Nate McMillan. Despite their regular season success, the Sonics lost in the first round to the 8th-seed Denver Nuggets (the first 8th seed to beat the #1 seed in NBA history). The next season, they would lose to the Lakers in the First Round as well, despite being heavily favorite. In 1995–96, the Sonics got out of the First Round for the first time since 1992–93 and made their first NBA Finals appearance since 1979. However, like the Blazers in 1992, the Bulls, in Michael Jordan's first full season after retiring to play baseball, started their second three-peat by defeating the Sonics in six games. 1996 was not only their last Finals appearance, but the last time they made a Conference Finals, until the team left for Oklahoma City in 2008.

=== 2007 draft: Oden / Durant ===
Both teams beat long odds to emerge as the winners of the 2007 NBA draft lottery. Portland, with only a 5.3% chance, received the number one selection. Seattle, at a 9.7% chance, won the second pick. Their lottery luck and the presence of two generational prospects in the draft fueled instant hope for the revival of both franchises.

In the 2007 NBA draft, Portland selected Greg Oden as the draft's number one pick. Seattle followed, selecting Kevin Durant at number two.

Cruelly, neither city's fanbase would enjoy success from the draft. Oden was plagued with injuries and would play only 82 total games for the Blazers before being waived in 2012. Durant earned the 2007–2008 NBA Roookie of the Year award with the SuperSonics, but his addition was unable to prevent the team from being relocated to Oklahoma City the following year, where they began play as the Thunder.

=== Hiatus (2008–present) ===
The Blazers' rivalry did not continue with the newly relocated Oklahoma City Thunder, despite that organization's past history in Seattle and both teams continuing to play in the Western Conference Northwest Division. Over the years, Seattle SuperSonics fans would make the trip down to Portland when the Trail Blazers played Oklahoma City, just to boo the Thunder players. Although many disowned the team after the move to Oklahoma City, a small subset of fans continued to support the Thunder version of the team.

Both cities gained Major League Soccer teams in the years since the SuperSonics left, with the Sounders beginning play in 2009 and the Timbers in 2011. The Portland Timbers–Seattle Sounders rivalry, which dates back to the 1970s, has continued the civic rivalry, as has the three-team Cascadia Cup with Vancouver Whitecaps FC (former home of the similarly relocated Vancouver Grizzlies NBA team).

The Blazers eliminated the Thunder from the first round of the 2019 NBA playoffs on a Game 5, 37-foot (11 m) buzzer beater 3 by Damian Lillard. Lillard mockingly waved goodbye to the Thunder after the shot, and would later comment: "What can I say? That was for Seattle." By the 2018–19 Thunder team, there were no players left from the Seattle-era of the team, although Russell Westbrook was drafted a SuperSonic and did promotional draft day photoshoots with SuperSonics' apparel, six days before they officially became the Oklahoma City Thunder.

On October 3, 2022, the Blazers played in a "Rain City Showcase" preseason game versus the Los Angeles Clippers at the newly renovated Climate Pledge Arena in Seattle.

During the NBA's meetings on March 24 and 25, 2026, the league's Board of Governors unanimously voted to explore adding an expansion team in Seattle and Las Vegas, which has paved the path for the revival of not just the Seattle SuperSonics as a new expansion team (while retaining their past history as a franchise), but also the I-5 Rivalry (alongside other rivalries the SuperSonics franchise were involved with) being reborn as well.

== Annual finishes ==
Season	NBA season
W	Wins
L	Losses
%	Winning percentage
Playoffs	Final result in season's playoffs
Series	Record in season's head-to-head matchups
*	Trail Blazers had more regular season wins than SuperSonics
†	SuperSonics had more regular season wins than Trail Blazers
‡	Trail Blazers won season series against the SuperSonics
§	SuperSonics won season series against the Trail Blazers

=== Regular season ===
Season	Trail Blazers					SuperSonics					Series
Season	Team	W	L	%	Playoffs	Team	W	L	%	Playoffs	Series
1970–71	Trail Blazers	29	53	.354		SuperSonics	38†	44	.463		SEA 4–2^{§}
1971–72	Trail Blazers	18	64	.220		SuperSonics	47†	35	.537		SEA 6–0^{§}
1972–73	Trail Blazers	21	61	.256		SuperSonics	26†	56	.317		SEA 4–3^{§}
1973–74	Trail Blazers	27	55	.329		SuperSonics	36†	46	.439		3–3
1974–75	Trail Blazers	38	44	.463		SuperSonics	43†	39	.524	Lost Conference Semifinals	SEA 6–2^{§}
1975–76	Trail Blazers	37	45	.451		SuperSonics	43†	39	.524	Lost Conference Semifinals	3–3
1976–77	Trail Blazers	49*	33	.598	Won NBA Finals	SuperSonics	40	42	.488		POR 3–1^{‡}
1977–78	Trail Blazers	58*	24	.707	Lost Conference Semifinals	SuperSonics	47	35	.549	Lost NBA Finals	POR 3–1^{‡}
1978–79	Trail Blazers	45	37	.549	Lost First Round	SuperSonics	52†	30	.634	Won NBA Finals	SEA 3–1^{§}
1979–80	Trail Blazers	38	44	.463	Lost First Round	SuperSonics	56†	26	.683	Lost Conference Finals	SEA 5–1^{§}
1980–81	Trail Blazers	45*	37	.549	Lost First Round	SuperSonics	34	48	.415		POR 4–2^{‡}
1981–82	Trail Blazers	42	40	.512		SuperSonics	52†	30	.634	Lost Conference Semifinals	3–3
1982–83	Trail Blazers	46	36	.561	Lost Conference Semifinals	SuperSonics	48†	34	.585	Lost First Round	3–3
1983–84	Trail Blazers	48*	34	.585	Lost First Round	SuperSonics	42	40	.512	Lost First Round	POR 4–2^{‡}
1984–85	Trail Blazers	42*	40	.512	Lost Conference Semifinals	SuperSonics	31	51	.378		POR 4–2^{‡}
1985–86	Trail Blazers	40*	42	.488	Lost First Round	SuperSonics	31	51	.378		POR 5–1^{‡}
1986–87	Trail Blazers	49*	33	.598	Lost First Round	SuperSonics	39	43	.476	Lost Conference Finals	POR 4–2^{‡}
1987–88	Trail Blazers	53*	29	.646	Lost First Round	SuperSonics	44	38	.537	Lost First Round	3–3
1988–89	Trail Blazers	39	43	.476	Lost First Round	SuperSonics	47†	35	.573	Lost Conference Semifinals	SEA 4–2^{§}
1989–90	Trail Blazers	59*	23	.720	Lost NBA Finals	SuperSonics	41	41	.500		POR 3–2^{‡}
1990–91	Trail Blazers	63*	19	.768	Lost Conference Finals	SuperSonics	41	41	.500	Lost First Round	POR 4–0^{‡}
1991–92	Trail Blazers	57*	25	.695	Lost NBA Finals	SuperSonics	47	35	.573	Lost Conference Semifinals	POR 4–1^{‡}
1992–93	Trail Blazers	51	31	.622	Lost First Round	SuperSonics	55†	27	.671	Lost Conference Finals	SEA 3–2^{§}
1993–94	Trail Blazers	47	35	.573	Lost First Round	SuperSonics	63†	19	.768	Lost First Round	SEA 4–1^{§}
1994–95	Trail Blazers	44	38	.537	Lost First Round	SuperSonics	57†	25	.695	Lost First Round	SEA 3–2^{§}
1995–96	Trail Blazers	44	38	.537	Lost First Round	SuperSonics	64†	18	.780	Lost NBA Finals	SEA 3–1^{§}
1996–97	Trail Blazers	49	33	.598	Lost First Round	SuperSonics	57†	25	.695	Lost Conference Semifinals	SEA 3–1^{§}
1997–98	Trail Blazers	46	36	.561	Lost First Round	SuperSonics	61†	21	.744	Lost Conference Semifinals	SEA 4–0^{§}
1998–99	Trail Blazers	35*	15	.700	Lost Conference Finals	SuperSonics	25	25	.500		2–2
1999–2000	Trail Blazers	59*	23	.720	Lost Conference Finals	SuperSonics	45	37	.549	Lost First Round	POR 4–0^{‡}
2000–01	Trail Blazers	50*	32	.610	Lost First Round	SuperSonics	44	38	.537		2–2
2001–02	Trail Blazers	49*	33	.598	Lost First Round	SuperSonics	45	37	.549	Lost First Round	POR 3–1^{‡}
2002–03	Trail Blazers	50*	32	.610	Lost First Round	SuperSonics	40	42	.488		POR 4–0^{‡}
2003–04	Trail Blazers	41*	41	.500		SuperSonics	37	45	.451		2–2
2004–05	Trail Blazers	27	55	.329		SuperSonics	52†	30	.634	Lost Conference Semifinals	SEA 3–1^{§}
2005–06	Trail Blazers	21	61	.256		SuperSonics	35†	47	.427		SEA 3–1^{§}
2006–07	Trail Blazers	32*	50	.390		SuperSonics	31	51	.378		2–2
2007–08	Trail Blazers	41*	41	.500		SuperSonics	20	62	.244		2–2

=== Postseason ===
- 1978 Western Conference Semifinals: SuperSonics won, 4–2
- 1980 Western Conference First Round: SuperSonics won, 2–1
- 1983 Western Conference First Round: Trail Blazers won, 2–0
- 1991 Western Conference First Round: Trail Blazers won, 3–2

== See also ==
- List of NBA rivalries
- Portland Timbers–Seattle Sounders rivalry
- Portland–Seattle rivalry
- Dodgers–Padres rivalry (MLB rivalry under the same name)
