= Portland Timbers–Seattle Sounders rivalry =

American soccer rivalry

- Other names: Cascadia Cup
- Location: Pacific Northwest
- Teams: Portland Timbers; Seattle Sounders FC
- First meeting: May 2, 1975; NASL; Portland 0–1 Seattle
- Latest meeting: July 16, 2026; MLS regular season Seattle 1–5 Portland
- Next meeting: August 1, 2026; MLS regular season Portland v Seattle

Statistics
- Total meetings: 145
- Most wins: Seattle (68)
- All-time series: 68–58–19 (Seattle; W-L-D)
- Largest victory: Portland 1–6 Seattle; WACS (July 3, 1985)
- Largest goal scoring: Portland 2–6 Seattle; MLS regular season (August 15, 2021)

Postseason history
- 1975 NASL quarterfinals: Portland won 2–1.; 2004 A-League conference semifinals: Seattle won 3–2 on aggregate.; 2005 USL–1 quarterfinals: Seattle won 3–0 on aggregate.; 2013 MLS conference semifinals: Portland won 5–3 on aggregate.; 2018 MLS conference semifinals: 4–4 on aggregate, Portland won 4–2 on penalties.

The Portland Timbers–Seattle Sounders rivalry is a soccer rivalry between the Portland Timbers and Seattle Sounders FC, both based in the Pacific Northwest region of the United States. The rivalry originated in the North American Soccer League of the 1970s, with both cities reviving expansion teams, and has carried into lower-level leagues, including the A-League and USL First Division. The rivalry moved to Major League Soccer, the top division of soccer in the United States, in 2011, where it has grown into one of the largest in American soccer.

According to many players, the Seattle–Portland rivalry is one of the only true derbies that is present in American men's soccer. The rivalry has since grown into one of the largest and most bitter rivalries in American soccer. Alan Hinton, a former English international and ex-Sounders coach, has compared the rivalry to those seen in the English Premier League. It is considered to be one of the most intense rivalries in the United States. In 2018, Matt Pentz of ESPN FC dubbed the derby "MLS' premier rivalry", stating that the "series' longevity lends it an authenticity that no other rivalry in MLS can match."

Seattle and Portland have had rivalries based on various sports teams. A heated rivalry surrounded the Portland Buckaroos and Seattle Totems of the minor-league Western Hockey League in the 1960s. Later, some fans supported the Thunderbirds or Winterhawks hockey teams. This rivalry "naturally translated into soccer" according to one fan. The two cities also had a rivalry between the SuperSonics and Trail Blazers of the NBA, known as the I-5 rivalry, since both cities are connected by Interstate 5.

== Overall stats ==
As of October 4, 2025

| Competition | Matches | Wins | | Draws |
| Competition | Matches | Portland | Seattle | Draws |
|---|---|---|---|---|
| NASL (1975–1982) | 20 | 7 | 13 | 0 |
| NASL indoor (1980–1982) | 8 | 4 | 4 | 0 |
| WACS/WSA/WSL (1985–1990) | 13 | 6 | 5 | 2 |
| A-League/USL-1 (2001–2008) | 31 | 11 | 16 | 5 |
| MLS (2011–present) | 50 | 20 | 19 | 11 |
| League totals (regular season) | 122 | 47 | 57 | 18 |
| NASL playoffs | 1 | 1 | 0 | 0 |
| A-League/USL-1 playoffs | 4 | 1 | 3 | 0 |
| MLS playoffs | 4 | 3 | 1 | 0 |
| League totals (playoffs) | 9 | 5 | 4 | 0 |
| U.S. Open Cup | 8 | 3 | 5 | 0 |
| U.S. Open Cup totals | 8 | 3 | 5 | 0 |
| Friendlies (all formats) | 5 | 2 | 2 | 1 |
| All-time totals | 144 | 57 | 68 | 19 |

== History ==
=== NASL era ===
The Seattle Sounders and Portland Timbers first played each other on May 2, 1975, in the Timbers' inaugural game. Seattle defeated Portland 1–0 in front of 8,131 at Portland Civic Stadium, now known as Providence Park. The return match, played on July 26, 1975 saw Portland play spoils and defeat the hosts, Seattle 2–1, in front of a crowd of 27,310. A month later, Portland knocks Seattle out of the playoffs in front of a crowd of 31,000.

On June 30, 1979, Seattle defeated Portland 5–1 in the Kingdome in front of a season high 34,000 spectators. Until the 1980s, it would stand as the largest victory in the derby, and it is the largest victory by either side in the top tier of American soccer. In the 5–1 victory, Seattle's Derek Smethurst netted a hat trick.

At the end of the 1982 North American Soccer League season, the Portland Timbers franchise was forced to fold, as team expenditures outpaced club income. Consequently, the 1–0 Sounders victory over the Timbers on August 22, 1982 ended up being the final meeting between the two sides in the North American Soccer League. It would not be for nearly 30 years, in 2011, the two sides would meet against one another in the top flight of American soccer.

==== NASL indoor ====
In the 1980–81 NASL Indoor season the two clubs faced one another for the first time in indoor soccer. On November 21, 1980 in front of 7,885 at Portland's Memorial Coliseum (now called Veterans Memorial Coliseum), the Timbers won, 6–4. The Sounders would claim victory in the next four meetings. Portland won the final three rivalry matches of 1981–82 indoor, including the teams' last-ever indoor match-up, 6–4, on the strength of Dale Mitchell's hat trick on February 5, 1982.

=== WSL/WSA era ===
At the end of the 1983 NASL season, the original Seattle Sounders franchise terminated, with the league itself ceasing operations ahead of the 1985 season. In 1984, a Western Soccer Alliance franchise was granted to the Seattle area for a soccer club in the area that was branded as the Seattle Storm, and went under the F.C. Seattle moniker for a while. The following year, a WSA franchise was also granted to the Portland area, where the rivalry continued through the late 1980s into the early 1990s.

=== USL ===
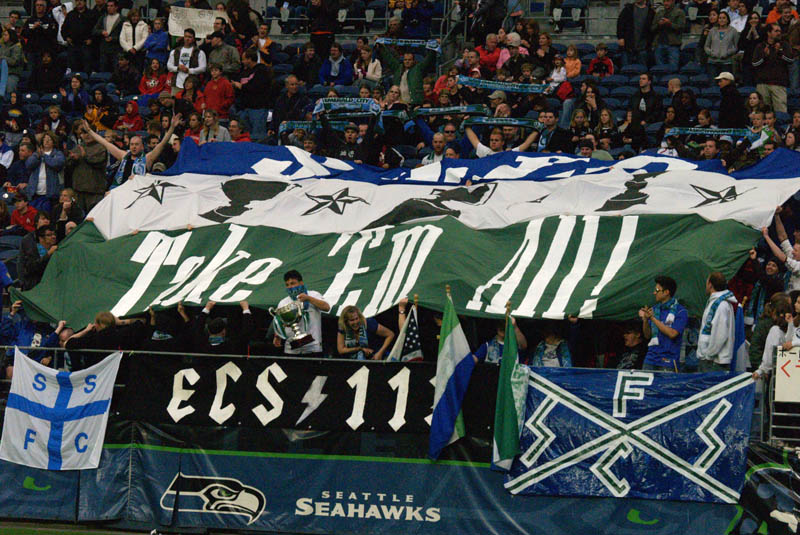
Sounders' fans in Seattle during a match against Portland in 2008

After an 11-year hiatus, the rivalry continued in 2001, when the newly incarnated Portland Timbers hosted the Seattle Sounders on May 11, 2001 at the same stadium where the rivalry began, which was now known as PGE Park. In front of a crowd of nearly 12,300, the hosts walked away with a 2–0 victory.

July 21, 2001, former U.S. National Team player, Brian Ching, would score the only goal in a 1–0 Sounders victory over the Timbers, as over 11,000 would be in attendance in Portland.

Ahead of the 2004 season, supporters of both the Sounders, Timbers, and their rival up the I-5 corridor, the Vancouver Whitecaps, created the Cascadia Cup which would be given to the supporters whose team had a stronger record against the two sides. The first formal Cascadia Cup match between the two resulted in a Timbers victory, defeating the Sounders 2–0 on May 1, 2004. During the four regular-season meetings during that season, the Sounders lost thrice and had one victory over Portland. However, in the 2004 USL First Division Playoffs, their first playoff meeting since 1975, the Sounders won 3–2 on aggregate over Portland, posting a 2–0 home victory in the second leg.

On September 18, 2005, Seattle knocked Portland out of the playoffs for a second straight year, as the Sounders defeated the Timbers 2–0 in Seattle.

In Seattle, the Sounders defeated the Timbers 3–1 on July 22, 2006, in a hotly contested match that accumulated eight yellow cards and one red.

On May 10, 2008, in front of over 10,000 at Qwest Field (now Lumen Field), Seattle and Portland played out a 0–0 draw in the final match the two teams would play each other in Seattle in the USL-1. On August 7, 2008, the Timbers and Sounders played each other for a final time in the Division 2 league, USL-1. Seattle defeated Portland 1–0 on the historic night, in front of a rambunctious 12,332 fans. The high-intensity match also included a total of six cards handed out and one ejection.

=== MLS era ===
On July 1, 2009, Seattle eliminated Portland 2–1 before a sold-out PGE Park crowd in the U.S. Open Cup. Roger Levesque — a player Portland fans have had a particular dislike for — scored Seattle's first goal within the opening minute. Levesque completed a goal celebration, in which he stood still at the top of the Timbers penalty area while Nate Jaqua pretended to chop him down like a tree, ending with Levesque falling flat on his back.

A cold and rainy night on March 11, 2010, Portland defeated Seattle 1–0 in a preseason community shield charity match. The crowd of 18,606 in attendance that night at Qwest Field is one of the largest crowds to attend a preseason game between two U.S. teams in American soccer history.

In hoping to stoke the rivalry for the future 2011 Major League Soccer season — when the Timbers would be joining the Sounders in MLS — Portland unveiled a billboard displaying a Timbers crest and the words Portland, Oregon and Soccer City USA less than a mile from Qwest Field in Seattle. The billboard was broadcast to a nationwide audience on ESPN2 during halftime of the Sounders home match versus Real Salt Lake that evening.

In March 2011, the Timbers defeated the Sounders 2–0 in the preseason Cascadia Summit, a round robin game event involving the two teams and their Canadian rival, Vancouver Whitecaps FC. In their first match as both MLS sides, and the first time since 1982 the two played in the top division of American soccer the Timbers and the Sounders battled to a draw at a rain-soaked Qwest Field in front of 36,593 in the highly anticipated MLS debut of the three-way Cascadia Cup. This was a stadium record crowd to see a regular season MLS match, and included more than 500 traveling Portland fans. The return match, on July 10, 2011 saw Seattle earn a 3–2 road victory.

On October 7, 2012, Seattle hosted Portland at CenturyLink Field in front of 66,452 people, the second-largest stand-alone crowd in MLS history. The Timbers had their second chance of the year to clinch their first Cascadia Cup contested by all three sides, but lost 3–0 to the host Sounders.

In the fourth round of the 2015 U.S. Open Cup, the Sounders hosted the Timbers at the Starfire Sports Complex in Tukwila, Washington. Seattle, the defending champions of the Open Cup, lost 3–1 and ended the match with only six players after three were sent off by the referee with red cards and Obafemi Martins was injured after all three substitutions had been used. The final red card was given to Clint Dempsey for tearing up the notebook of referee Daniel Radford, for which he was suspended an additional three Open Cup matches. The match was later nicknamed the "Red Card Wedding" by fans, a reference to an episode of the television series Game of Thrones with a "red wedding".

From 2015 through 2021, either Portland or Seattle represented the MLS Western Conference in the MLS Cup title game. Seattle won two titles in four appearances, while Portland won one in three; the Timbers also won the 2020 MLS is Back Tournament, held during the COVID-19 pandemic. From 2018 to 2022, the home team won only one of eleven rivalry matches played during the MLS regular season. An August 2021 match at Providence Park ended in a 6–2 Sounders victory, the largest margin in the rivalry's history and the most goals conceded by the Timbers in any league competition. From May 2017 to October 2025, Portland was unbeaten in the 10 regular season away games (5 wins, 5 draws) played at Lumen Field in Seattle.

On August 29, 2021, the Sounders and OL Reign hosted a men's–women's doubleheader with their respective opponents from Portland (the Timbers and Thorns). The women's match, a 2–1 Reign victory, set a National Women's Soccer League attendance record, with 27,248 spectators, and was followed by 45,737 for the Sounders' 2–0 loss to the Timbers. A similar doubleheader was played on June 3, 2023, with 42,054 spectators reported for the Sounders match.

== Supporter groups ==
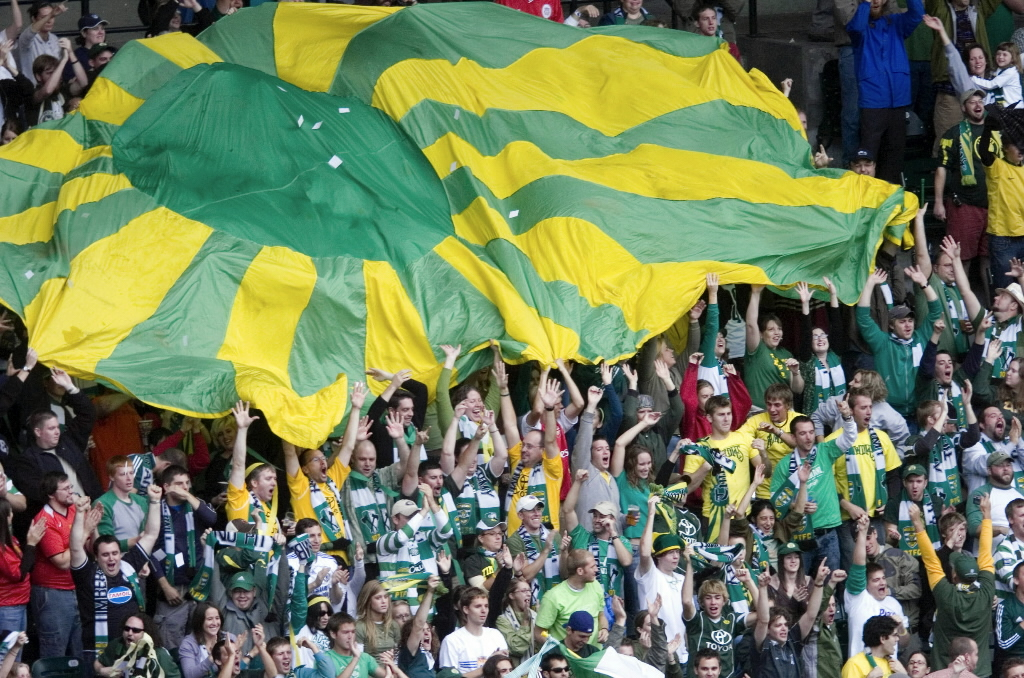
The Timbers' Army, pictured in 2009

A bitter rivalry between the teams' supporter groups exists. The Portland Timbers are supported by the Timbers Army, and Seattle Sounders by the Emerald City Supporters. The spirited groups have always shown a deep amount of resentment toward each other throughout the years. With the proximity of the two cities, traveling fans of both sides witness hostile environments while visiting the opposing stadium. A rare moment of violence broke out in March 2010 after a preseason Timbers win in Seattle, when, three Sounders fans (who were supposedly not associated with any Sounders supporters group) assaulted a Timbers fan, choking and dragging him with his team scarf.

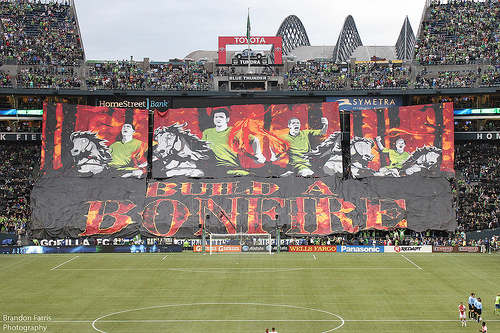
Emerald City Supporter's "Build a Bonfire" tifo at the Sounders FC v. Timbers FC in 2013.

On March 20, 2009, at the Portland MLS expansion rally, League Commissioner Don Garber mentioned what a great region the Pacific Northwest is for soccer, and gave an example by the success of the new MLS team Seattle Sounders FC. However, his comment was met with heavy boos and jeers coming from the Timbers Army surrounding him. Portland mayor, Sam Adams, then offered a challenge to the Seattle mayor for when the Timbers and Sounders meet in 2011.

== Attendance ==
| Rnk | Date | Competition | Attendance | Venue |
|---|---|---|---|---|
| 1 | August 25, 2013 | MLS | 67,385 | CenturyLink Field |
| 2 | October 7, 2012 | MLS | 66,452 | CenturyLink Field |
| 3 | August 30, 2015 | MLS | 64,358 | CenturyLink Field |
| 4 | July 13, 2014 | MLS | 64,207 | CenturyLink Field |
| 5 | August 21, 2016 | MLS | 53,302 | CenturyLink Field |

== Players and transfers ==
A large portion of the Sounders-Timbers rivalry can be seen on the soccer field itself. Before Seattle made the jump to MLS, many on-field rivalries between the players existed. As the years progressed, this would only enhance the level of competition and intensify the matches. An example of this was the notable rivalry between Timbers defender Scot Thompson and Sounders striker Roger Levesque. Levesque played in Seattle from 2006 to 2012, while Thompson played in Portland from 2004 to 2010.

Another reason the rivalry intensified was the transfer of star players between the two teams. While many players transferred to the other rival city from when the Timbers resumed play in 2001, the most memorable was the signing of Portland's all time assist leader, and fan favorite Hugo Alcaraz-Cuellar to Seattle in 2007. That same season, Seattle star Andrew Gregor signed with Portland, thus creating tensions on the field, as the players became familiar with each other. While playing for the Sounders in 2003, Gregor had said "A lot of the guys, we know each other from years back, and we don't get along and stuff. It's always exciting."

NASL and USL matches between the teams were intense and more physical than those of other teams in the leagues. Former Sounders head coach Sigi Schmid said in 2010 that Seattle, Portland, and Vancouver playing in the same league again will be "something that's going to be one of the key features of MLS". The first of these was Seattle fan favorite Mike Fucito who came to Portland via the Montreal Impact on April 20, 2012.

=== Seattle, then Portland ===
| Name | Pos | Seattle | | | Portland | | |
| Name | Pos | Career | Apps | Goals | Career | Apps | Goals |
|---|---|---|---|---|---|---|---|
| (United States) Roger Goldingay | FW | 1974 | | | 1975–76 | 15 | 0 |
| (United States) Hank Liotart | MF | 1974–76 | 45 | 2 | 1976–77 | 28 | 2 |
| (England) David Butler | FW | 1974–78 | 97 | 34 | 1979 | 20 | 6 |
| (Scotland) John Bain | MF | 1983 | 24 | 2 | 1989–90 | | |
| (United States) Peter Hattrup | FW | 1984–89 | | | 1990 | | |
| (United States) Daryl Green | DF | 1986–89 | | | 1990 | | |
| (United States) Billy Crook | DF | 1988 | | | 1990 | | |
| (Scotland) Ian MacLean | DF | 1989 | 1 | 1 | 1990 | | |
| (United States) Scott Benedetti | FW | 1990 | | | 2001–05 | 96 | 6 |
| (United States) Chugger Adair | FW | 1997 | 19 | 5 | 2002 | 20 | 2 |
| (United States) Mark Baena | FW | 1998–99 | 44 | 41 | 2001 | 24 | 13 |
| (United States) Greg Howes | MF | 2000 | 27 | 17 | 2001–02 | 40 | 12 |
| (United States) Darren Sawatzky | FW | 2000 | 28 | 16 | 2001 | 22 | 5 |
| (United States) Rees Bettinger | FW | 2001 | 23 | 5 | 2002 | 5 | 0 |
| (United States) Scott Bower | MF | 2001 | 1 | 0 | 2002 | 4 | 0 |
| (United States) Andrew Gregor | MF | 2002 | 46 | 16 | 2004 | 13 | 2 |
| (United States) Alex Bengard | MF | 2003 | 23 | 3 | 2004 | 24 | 5 |
| (United States) Andrew Gregor | MF | 2005–06 | 39 | 8 | 2007–08 | 37 | 8 |
| (United States) Stephen Keel | DF | 2006 | 10 | 1 | 2009–10 | 52 | 1 |
| (United States) Kevin Forrest | FW | 2008–09 | 9 | 0 | 2009 | 10 | 0 |
| (United States) Mike Fucito | FW | 2009–11 | 23 | 3 | 2012 | 12 | 0 |
| (Democratic Republic of the Congo) Steve Zakuani | FW | 2009–13 | 100 | 19 | 2014 | 20 | 1 |
| (United States) Andrew Weber | GK | 2012–13 | 6 | 0 | 2014–15 | 3 | 0 |
| (United States) Trey Muse | GK | 2019-21 | | | 2023 | | |

=== Portland, then Seattle ===
| Name | Pos | Portland | | | Seattle | | |
| Name | Pos | Career | Apps | Goals | Career | Apps | Goals |
|---|---|---|---|---|---|---|---|
| (Scotland) John Bain | MF | 1978–82 | 148 | 45 | 1983 | 24 | 2 |
| (England) David Butler | FW | 1979 | 20 | 6 | 1983 | 1 | 0 |
| (United States) Grant Gibbs | DF | 1985–87 | | | 1988–90 | | |
| (United States) Todd Strobeck | GK | 1985–90 | | | 1993–95 | | |
| (United States) Brent Goulet | FW | 1986–87 | | 9 | 1987 | 5 | 2 |
| (United States) Scott Benedetti | FW | 1986–89 | | | 1990 | | |
| (United States) Joey Leonetti | FW | 1988 | | | 1996 | | |
| (United States) Dick McCormick | MF | 1988–90 | | | 1994–96 | 52 | 6 |
| (United States) Kasey Keller | GK | 1989 | 10 | 0 | 2009–11 | 93 | 0 |
| (United States) Garrett Smith | DF | 1989 | | | 1990 | | |
| (United States) Wade Webber | DF | 1989 | | | 1990 | | |
| (United States) Billy Crook | DF | 1990 | | | 1994–96 | | |
| (United States) Peter Hattrup | FW | 1990 | | | 1994–95 | | |
| (United States) Shawn Medved | FW | 1990 | | 10 | 1994–95 | | 7 |
| (United States) Darren Sawatzky | FW | 2001 | 22 | 5 | 2002–04 | 67 | 22 |
| (United States) Greg Howes | MF | 2001–02 | 40 | 12 | 2007 | 21 | 5 |
| (United States) Ben Somoza | MF | 2002 | 21 | 1 | 2003–06 | 60 | 2 |
| (United States) Jake Sagare | MF | 2002–04 | 72 | 5 | 2005–06 | 29 | 0 |
| (Mexico) Hugo Alcaraz-Cuellar | MF | 2002–06 | 131 | 10 | 2007–08 | 41 | 3 |
| (United States) Andrew Gregor | MF | 2004 | 13 | 2 | 2005–06 | 39 | 8 |
| (Scotland) Adam Moffat | MF | 2011 | 4 | 0 | 2013 | 6 | 0 |
| (United States) Kenny Cooper | FW | 2011 | 34 | 8 | 2014 | 24 | 6 |
| (United States) Troy Perkins | GK | 2011–2012 | 51 | 0 | 2015 | 4 | 0 |

== Cups ==
Between 2004 and 2008, the USL Seattle Sounders, Portland Timbers, and Vancouver Whitecaps competed for the supporter-created Cascadia Cup, to be awarded to the club that finished with the best record in each season series between the three teams. The Cascadia Cup was created to celebrate the strong rivalries between each of the three clubs. Seattle won the Cascadia Cup twice in these five years while Portland never won. Seattle was not involved in the 2009 or 2010 competitions, both of which were won by Portland. While both Seattle and Portland consider Vancouver to be a rival, both of the U.S. fanbases consider their rivalries with Vancouver more cordial than with one another. In a 2011 story on the rivalry by Sports Illustrated writer Grant Wahl, one Timbers Army member said about Vancouver fans, "It's hard to dislike them because they're so nice", and an Emerald City Supporters member added, "They're like the nice cousin that's never going to offend anyone at a party." The MLS versions of the Whitecaps, Sounders and Timbers resumed contesting the Cascadia Cup, beginning with the 2011 season.

== Results ==
For statistical purposes, matches that went to shoot-outs are counted as draws and denoted with an '*'.

=== NASL era ===
| Season | Date | Competition | Stadium | Home team | Result | Away team | Attendance | Series | Ref |
|---|---|---|---|---|---|---|---|---|---|
| 1975 | May 2 | NASL | Civic Stadium | Portland Timbers | 0–1 | Seattle Sounders | 6,913 | SEA 1–0–0 | |
| 1975 | July 26 | NASL | Civic Stadium | Portland Timbers | 2–1 | Seattle Sounders | 27,310 | Tied 1–1–0 | |
| 1975 | August 2 | NASL | Memorial Stadium | Seattle Sounders | 3–2 | Portland Timbers | 17,925 | SEA 2–1–0 | |
| 1975 | August 12 | NASL playoffs | Civic Stadium | Portland Timbers | 2–1 | Seattle Sounders | 31,523 | Tied 2–2–0 | |
| 1976 | April 25 | NASL | Kingdome | Seattle Sounders | 1–0 | Portland Timbers | 24,983 | SEA 3–2–0 | |
| 1976 | August 7 | NASL | Civic Stadium | Portland Timbers | 0–3 | Seattle Sounders | 17,049 | SEA 4–2–0 | |
| 1977 | April 30 | NASL | Kingdome | Seattle Sounders | 3–2 | Portland Timbers | 25,237 | SEA 5–2–0 | |
| 1977 | June 11 | NASL | Civic Stadium | Portland Timbers | 3–0 | Seattle Sounders | 15,746 | SEA 5–3–0 | |
| 1978 | June 10 | NASL | Civic Stadium | Portland Timbers | 0–0* | Seattle Sounders | 15,526 | SEA 5–3–1 | |
| 1978 | July 31 | NASL | Kingdome | Seattle Sounders | 3–2 | Portland Timbers | 22,042 | SEA 6–3–1 | |
| 1979 | June 9 | NASL | Civic Stadium | Portland Timbers | 2–1 | Seattle Sounders | 12,175 | SEA 6–4–1 | |
| 1979 | July 31 | NASL | Kingdome | Seattle Sounders | 5–1 | Portland Timbers | 34,012 | SEA 7–4–1 | |
| 1980 | April 30 | NASL | Kingdome | Seattle Sounders | 1–0 | Portland Timbers | 12,278 | SEA 8–4–1 | |
| 1980 | June 14 | NASL | Civic Stadium | Portland Timbers | 0–0* | Seattle Sounders | 10,131 | SEA 8–4–2 | |
| 1981 | April 4 | NASL | Kingdome | Seattle Sounders | 1–1* | Portland Timbers | 24,604 | SEA 8–4–3 | |
| 1981 | June 13 | NASL | Civic Stadium | Portland Timbers | 2–1 | Seattle Sounders | 15,316 | SEA 8–5–3 | |
| 1981 | August 15 | NASL | Kingdome | Seattle Sounders | 1–2 | Portland Timbers | 16,747 | SEA 8–6–3 | |
| 1982 | April 9 | NASL | Kingdome | Seattle Sounders | 0–1 | Portland Timbers | 14,286 | SEA 8–7–3 | |
| 1982 | July 24 | NASL | Civic Stadium | Portland Timbers | 1–4 | Seattle Sounders | 8,488 | SEA 9–7–3 | |
| 1982 | July 31 | NASL | Kingdome | Seattle Sounders | 3–0 | Portland Timbers | 13,380 | SEA 10–7–3 | |
| 1982 | August 22 | NASL | Civic Stadium | Portland Timbers | 0–1 | Seattle Sounders | 9,517 | SEA 11–7–3 | |

==== NASL Indoor ====
| Season | Date | Competition | Stadium | Home team | Result | Away team | Attendance | Series | Ref |
|---|---|---|---|---|---|---|---|---|---|
| 1980 | November 21 | NASL | Memorial Coliseum | Portland Timbers | 6–4 | Seattle Sounders | 7,885 | POR 1–0–0 | |
| 1980 | December 18 | NASL | Kingdome | Seattle Sounders | 5–4 | Portland Timbers | 4,163 | Tied 1–1–0 | |
| 1980 | December 24 | NASL | Memorial Coliseum | Portland Timbers | 5–10 | Seattle Sounders | 4,712 | SEA 2–1–0 | |
| 1981 | January 9 | NASL | Kingdome | Seattle Sounders | 3–2 | Portland Timbers | 8,301 | SEA 3–1–0 | |
| 1981 | December 4 | NASL | Kingdome | Seattle Sounders | 5–3 | Portland Timbers | 7,023 | SEA 4–1–0 | |
| 1981 | December 21 | NASL | Memorial Coliseum | Portland Timbers | 8–5 | Seattle Sounders | 6,165 | SEA 4–2–0 | |
| 1982 | January 20 | NASL | Memorial Coliseum | Portland Timbers | 5–4 | Seattle Sounders | 3,666 | SEA 4–3–0 | |
| 1982 | February 5 | NASL | Kingdome | Seattle Sounders | 4–6 | Portland Timbers | 9,476 | Tied 4–4–0 | |

=== Alliance era ===
| Season | Date | Competition | Stadium | Home team | Result | Away team | Attendance | Series | Ref |
|---|---|---|---|---|---|---|---|---|---|
| 1985 | June 30 | WACS | Memorial Stadium | F.C. Seattle | 0–2 | F.C. Portland | 2,212 | POR 1–0–0 | |
| 1985 | July 3 | WACS | Civic Stadium | F.C. Portland | 1–6 | F.C. Seattle | 2,906 | Tied 1–1–0 | |
| 1985 | July 31 | WACS | Memorial Stadium | F.C. Seattle | 0–0 | F.C. Portland | 1,000 | Tied 1–1–1 | |
| 1986 | July 3 | WSA | Civic Stadium | F.C. Portland | 1–3 | F.C. Seattle | 1,124 | SEA 2–1–1 | |
| 1986 | July 26 | WSA | Renton Memorial Stadium | F.C. Seattle | 1–1 | F.C. Portland | | SEA 2–1–2 | |
| 1987 | March 28 | WSA | Civic Stadium | F.C. Portland | 2–1 | F.C. Seattle Storm | 1,343 | Tied 2–2–2 | |
| 1987 | May 9 | WSA | Memorial Stadium | F.C. Seattle Storm | 1–0 | F.C. Portland | 2,500 | SEA 3–2–2 | |
| 1988 | May 14 | WSA | Cronin Field | F.C. Portland | 1–3 | Seattle Storm | 710 | SEA 4–2–2 | |
| 1988 | July 9 | WSA | Memorial Stadium | Seattle Storm | 3–2 | F.C. Portland | 9,000+ | SEA 5–2–2 | |
| 1989 | June 3 | WSL | Memorial Stadium | Seattle Storm | 2–3 | Portland Timbers | 3,875 | SEA 5–3–2 | |
| 1989 | July 12 | WSL | Civic Stadium | Portland Timbers | 1–0 | Seattle Storm | 4,887 | SEA 5–4–2 | |
| 1990 | July 18 | APSL | Memorial Stadium | Seattle Storm | 0–3 | Portland Timbers | 6,100 | Tied 5–5–2 | |
| 1990 | July 29 | APSL | Civic Stadium | Portland Timbers | 1–0 | Seattle Storm | | POR 6–5–2 | |

=== A-League/USL era ===
Cascadia Cup Match‡

| Season | Date | Competition | Stadium | Home team | Result | Away team | Attendance | Series | Ref |
|---|---|---|---|---|---|---|---|---|---|
| 2001 | May 11 | A-League | PGE Park | Portland Timbers | 2–0 | Seattle Sounders | 12,295 | POR 1–0–0 | |
| 2001 | May 12 | A-League | Memorial Stadium | Seattle Sounders | 2–1 | Portland Timbers | 2,112 | Tied 1–1–0 | |
| 2001 | July 13 | A-League | Memorial Stadium | Seattle Sounders | 0–0 | Portland Timbers | 3,253 | Tied 1–1–1 | |
| 2001 | July 21 | A-League | PGE Park | Portland Timbers | 0–1 | Seattle Sounders | 11,055 | SEA 2–1–1 | |
| 2002 | May 4 | A-League | PGE Park | Portland Timbers | 0–2 | Seattle Sounders | 8,775 | SEA 3–1–1 | |
| 2002 | May 5 | A-League | Memorial Stadium | Seattle Sounders | 4–1 | Portland Timbers | 2,756 | SEA 4–1–1 | |
| 2002 | June 23 | A-League | PGE Park | Portland Timbers | 1–0 | Seattle Sounders | 3,890 | SEA 4–2–1 | |
| 2002 | July 19 | A-League | Memorial Stadium | Seattle Sounders | 2–1 | Portland Timbers | 2,595 | SEA 5–2–1 | |
| 2003 | May 1 | A-League | PGE Park | Portland Timbers | 0–1 | Seattle Sounders | 5,993 | SEA 6–2–1 | |
| 2003 | May 2 | A-League | Seahawks Stadium | Seattle Sounders | 2–0 | Portland Timbers | 5,017 | SEA 7–2–1 | |
| 2003 | May 18 | A-League | Seahawks Stadium | Seattle Sounders | 1–0 | Portland Timbers | 3,945 | SEA 8–2–1 | |
| 2003 | August 9 | A-League | PGE Park | Portland Timbers | 0–1 | Seattle Sounders | 6,831 | SEA 9–2–1 | |
| 2003 | August 10 | A-League | Seahawks Stadium | Seattle Sounders | 1–3 | Portland Timbers | 2,990 | SEA 9–3–1 | |
| 2003 | August 18 | A-League | PGE Park | Portland Timbers | 1–0 | Seattle Sounders | 6,329 | SEA 9–4–1 | |
| 2004 | May 1‡ | A-League | PGE Park | Portland Timbers | 2–1 | Seattle Sounders | 6,891 | SEA 9–5–1 | |
| 2004 | May 15‡ | A-League | Seahawks Stadium | Seattle Sounders | 0–1 | Portland Timbers | 3,907 | SEA 9–6–1 | |
| 2004 | July 17‡ | A-League | Qwest Field | Seattle Sounders | 3–4 | Portland Timbers | 3,457 | SEA 9–7–1 | |
| 2004 | July 24‡ | A-League | PGE Park | Portland Timbers | 0–2 | Seattle Sounders | 4,267 | SEA 10–7–1 | |
| 2004 | September 1 | A-League playoffs | PGE Park | Portland Timbers | 2–1 | Seattle Sounders | 4,863 | SEA 10–8–1 | |
| 2004 | September 5 | A-League playoffs | Qwest Field | Seattle Sounders | 2–0 | Portland Timbers | 3,490 | SEA 11–8–1 | |
| 2005 | April 30‡ | USL | Qwest Field | Seattle Sounders | 1–2 | Portland Timbers | 6,351 | SEA 11-9-1 | |
| 2005 | July 8‡ | USL | Starfire Sports Complex | Seattle Sounders | 4–2 | Portland Timbers | 3,204 | SEA 12–9–1 | |
| 2005 | July 12 | U.S. Open Cup | PGE Park | Portland Timbers | 2–0 | Seattle Sounders | 2,462 | SEA 12–10–1 | |
| 2005 | August 7‡ | USL | PGE Park | Portland Timbers | 1–0 | Seattle Sounders | 4,227 | SEA 12-11-1 | |
| 2005 | August 20‡ | USL | PGE Park | Portland Timbers | 1–1 | Seattle Sounders | 8,242 | SEA 12–11–2 | |
| 2005 | September 16 | USL playoffs | PGE Park | Portland Timbers | 0–1 | Seattle Sounders | 5,667 | SEA 13–11–2 | |
| 2005 | September 18 | USL playoffs | Starfire Sports Complex | Seattle Sounders | 2–0 | Portland Timbers | 2,543 | SEA 14–11–2 | |
| 2006 | June 2‡ | USL | Qwest Field | Seattle Sounders | 0–0 | Portland Timbers | 2,251 | SEA 14–11–3 | |
| 2006 | June 3‡ | USL | PGE Park | Portland Timbers | 3–1 | Seattle Sounders | 6,149 | SEA 14–12–3 | |
| 2006 | July 21‡ | USL | PGE Park | Portland Timbers | 1–2 | Seattle Sounders | 6,215 | SEA 15–12–3 | |
| 2006 | July 22‡ | USL | Qwest Field | Seattle Sounders | 3–1 | Portland Timbers | 2,993 | SEA 16–12–3 | |
| 2007 | May 5 | USL | Qwest Field | Seattle Sounders | 1–0 | Portland Timbers | 8,247 | SEA 17–12–3 | |
| 2007 | May 11‡ | USL | PGE Park | Portland Timbers | 2–2 | Seattle Sounders | 5,722 | SEA 17–12–4 | |
| 2007 | June 26 | U.S. Open Cup | Starfire Sports Complex | Seattle Sounders | 2–1 | Portland Timbers | 711 | SEA 18–12–4 | |
| 2007 | August 1‡ | USL | Qwest Field | Seattle Sounders | 2–0 | Portland Timbers | 3,287 | SEA 19–12–4 | |
| 2008 | April 26‡ | USL | PGE Park | Portland Timbers | 2–0 | Seattle Sounders | 9,894 | SEA 19–13–4 | |
| 2008 | May 10‡ | USL | Qwest Field | Seattle Sounders | 0–0 | Portland Timbers | 10,184 | SEA 19–13–5 | |
| 2008 | August 7‡ | USL | PGE Park | Portland Timbers | 0–1 | Seattle Sounders | 12,332 | SEA 20–13–5 | |
| 2009 | July 1 | U.S. Open Cup | PGE Park | Portland Timbers | 1–2 | Seattle Sounders FC | 16,382 | SEA 21–13–5 | |
| 2010 | June 30 | U.S. Open Cup | PGE Park | Portland Timbers | 1–1* | Seattle Sounders FC | 15,422 | SEA 21–13–6 | |

=== MLS era ===
Cascadia Cup Match‡

| Season | Date | Competition | Stadium | Home team | Result | Away team | Attendance | Series | Ref |
|---|---|---|---|---|---|---|---|---|---|
| 2011 | May 14‡ | MLS | Qwest Field | Seattle Sounders FC | 1–1 | Portland Timbers | 36,593 | Tied 0–0–1 | |
| 2011 | July 10‡ | MLS | Jeld-Wen Field | Portland Timbers | 2–3 | Seattle Sounders FC | 18,627 | SEA 1–0–1 | |
| 2012 | June 24‡ | MLS | Jeld-Wen Field | Portland Timbers | 2–1 | Seattle Sounders FC | 20,438 | Tied 1–1–1 | |
| 2012 | September 15‡ | MLS | Jeld-Wen Field | Portland Timbers | 1–1 | Seattle Sounders FC | 20,438 | Tied 1–1–2 | |
| 2012 | October 7‡ | MLS | CenturyLink Field | Seattle Sounders FC | 3–0 | Portland Timbers | 66,452 | SEA 2–1–2 | |
| 2013 | March 16‡ | MLS | CenturyLink Field | Seattle Sounders FC | 1–1 | Portland Timbers | 40,150 | Tied 2–1–3 | |
| 2013 | August 25‡ | MLS | CenturyLink Field | Seattle Sounders FC | 1–0 | Portland Timbers | 67,385 | SEA 3–1–3 | |
| 2013 | October 13‡ | MLS | Jeld-Wen Field | Portland Timbers | 1–0 | Seattle Sounders FC | 20,674 | SEA 3–2–3 | |
| 2013 | November 2 | MLS Cup playoffs | CenturyLink Field | Seattle Sounders FC | 1–2 | Portland Timbers | 38,507 | Tied 3–3–3 | |
| 2013 | November 7 | MLS Cup playoffs | Jeld-Wen Field | Portland Timbers | 3–2 | Seattle Sounders FC | 20,674 | POR 4–3–3 | |
| 2014 | April 5‡ | MLS | Providence Park | Portland Timbers | 4–4 | Seattle Sounders FC | 20,814 | POR 4–3–4 | |
| 2014 | July 9 | U.S. Open Cup | Starfire Sports Complex | Seattle Sounders FC | 3–1 | Portland Timbers | 4,233 | Tied 4–4–4 | |
| 2014 | July 13‡ | MLS | CenturyLink Field | Seattle Sounders FC | 2–0 | Portland Timbers | 64,207 | SEA 5–4–4 | |
| 2014 | August 24‡ | MLS | Providence Park | Portland Timbers | 2–4 | Seattle Sounders FC | 20,814 | SEA 6–4–4 | |
| 2015 | April 26‡ | MLS | CenturyLink Field | Seattle Sounders FC | 1–0 | Portland Timbers | 41,451 | SEA 7–4–4 | |
| 2015 | June 16 | U.S. Open Cup | Starfire Sports Complex | Seattle Sounders FC | 1–3 | Portland Timbers | 4,022 | SEA 7–5–4 | |
| 2015 | June 28‡ | MLS | Providence Park | Portland Timbers | 4–1 | Seattle Sounders FC | 21,144 | SEA 7–6–4 | |
| 2015 | August 30‡ | MLS | CenturyLink Field | Seattle Sounders FC | 2–1 | Portland Timbers | 64,358 | SEA 8–6–4 | |
| 2016 | July 17‡ | MLS | Providence Park | Portland Timbers | 3–1 | Seattle Sounders FC | 21,144 | SEA 8–7–4 | |
| 2016 | August 21‡ | MLS | CenturyLink Field | Seattle Sounders FC | 3–1 | Portland Timbers | 53,302 | SEA 9–7–4 | |
| 2016 | August 28‡ | MLS | Providence Park | Portland Timbers | 4–2 | Seattle Sounders FC | 21,144 | SEA 9–8–4 | |
| 2017 | May 27‡ | MLS | CenturyLink Field | Seattle Sounders FC | 1–0 | Portland Timbers | 47,362 | SEA 10–8–4 | |
| 2017 | June 13 | U.S. Open Cup | Starfire Sports Complex | Seattle Sounders FC | 2–1 | Portland Timbers | 3,937 | SEA 11–8–4 | |
| 2017 | June 25‡ | MLS | Providence Park | Portland Timbers | 2–2 | Seattle Sounders FC | 21,144 | SEA 11–8–5 | |
| 2017 | August 27‡ | MLS | CenturyLink Field | Seattle Sounders FC | 1–1 | Portland Timbers | 51,796 | SEA 11–8–6 | |
| 2018 | May 13 | MLS | Providence Park | Portland Timbers | 1–0 | Seattle Sounders FC | 21,144 | SEA 11–9–6 | |
| 2018 | June 30‡ | MLS | CenturyLink Field | Seattle Sounders FC | 2–3 | Portland Timbers | 47,521 | SEA 11–10–6 | |
| 2018 | August 26‡ | MLS | Providence Park | Portland Timbers | 0–1 | Seattle Sounders FC | 21,144 | SEA 12–10–6 | |
| 2018 | November 4 | MLS Cup playoffs | Providence Park | Portland Timbers | 2–1 | Seattle Sounders FC | 21,144 | SEA 12–11–6 | |
| 2018 | November 8 | MLS Cup playoffs | CenturyLink Field | Seattle Sounders FC | 3–2 (a.e.t.) | Portland Timbers | 39,542 | SEA 13–11–6 | |
| 2019 | June 12 | U.S. Open Cup | Cheney Stadium | Seattle Sounders FC | 1–2 | Portland Timbers | 6,280 | SEA 13–12–6 | |
| 2019 | July 21‡ | MLS | CenturyLink Field | Seattle Sounders FC | 1–2 | Portland Timbers | 50,072 | Tied 13–13–6 | |
| 2019 | August 23‡ | MLS | Providence Park | Portland Timbers | 1–2 | Seattle Sounders FC | 25,218 | SEA 14–13–6 | |
| 2020 | August 23 | MLS | Providence Park | Portland Timbers | 0–3 | Seattle Sounders FC | 0 | SEA 15–13–6 | |
| 2020 | September 6 | MLS | CenturyLink Field | Seattle Sounders FC | 1–2 | Portland Timbers | 0 | SEA 15–14–6 | |
| 2020 | September 23 | MLS | Providence Park | Portland Timbers | 2–1 | Seattle Sounders FC | 0 | Tied 15–15–6 | |
| 2020 | October 22 | MLS | CenturyLink Field | Seattle Sounders FC | 1–1 | Portland Timbers | 0 | Tied 15–15–7 | |
| 2021 | May 9 | MLS | Providence Park | Portland Timbers | 1–2 | Seattle Sounders FC | 0 | SEA 16–15–7 | |
| 2021 | August 15‡ | MLS | Providence Park | Portland Timbers | 2–6 | Seattle Sounders FC | 25,218 | SEA 17–15–7 | |
| 2021 | August 29‡ | MLS | Lumen Field | Seattle Sounders FC | 0–2 | Portland Timbers | 45,737 | SEA 17–16–7 | |
| 2022 | July 9‡ | MLS | Lumen Field | Seattle Sounders FC | 0–3 | Portland Timbers | 47,722 | Tied 17–17–7 | |
| 2022 | August 26‡ | MLS | Providence Park | Portland Timbers | 2–1 | Seattle Sounders FC | 25,218 | POR 18–17–7 | |
| 2023 | April 15‡ | MLS | Providence Park | Portland Timbers | 4–1 | Seattle Sounders FC | 25,218 | POR 19–17–7 | |
| 2023 | June 3‡ | MLS | Lumen Field | Seattle Sounders FC | 0–0 | Portland Timbers | 42,054 | POR 19–17–8 | |
| 2023 | September 2‡ | MLS | Lumen Field | Seattle Sounders FC | 2–2 | Portland Timbers | 37,037 | POR 19–17–9 | |
| 2024 | May 12‡ | MLS | Providence Park | Portland Timbers | 1–2 | Seattle Sounders FC | 25,218 | POR 19–18–9 | |
| 2024 | August 31‡ | MLS | Providence Park | Portland Timbers | 1–0 | Seattle Sounders FC | 25,218 | POR 20–18–9 | |
| 2024 | October 19‡ | MLS | Lumen Field | Seattle Sounders FC | 1–1 | Portland Timbers | 36,341 | POR 20–18–10 | |
| 2025 | May 17‡ | MLS | Providence Park | Portland Timbers | 1–1 | Seattle Sounders FC | 25,218 | POR 20–18–11 | |
| 2025 | Oct 4‡ | MLS | Lumen Field | Seattle Sounders | 1–0 | Portland Timbers | 32,913 | POR 20–19–11 | |
| 2026 | July 16‡ | MLS | Lumen Field | Seattle Sounders FC | 1-5 | Portland Timbers | | TBD | |
| 2026 | August 1‡ | MLS | Providence Park | Portland Timbers | 2-1 | Seattle Sounders FC | | TBD | |

=== Notable friendlies ===
| Season | Date | Competition | Stadium | Home team | Result | Away team | Attendance | Series | Ref |
|---|---|---|---|---|---|---|---|---|---|
| 1979 | March 23 | NASL preseason | Renton Stadium | Seattle Sounders | 1–0 | Portland Timbers | 3,922 | SEA 1–0–0 | |
| 2002 | February 27 | International Exhibition | University of Washington | Sounders / Timbers Select | 0–1 | United States | | – | |
| 2002 | April 28 | Canterbury Cup | Sammamish High School | Seattle Sounders | 4–1 | Portland Timbers | | SEA 2–0–0 | |
| 2010 | March 11 | Community Shield | Qwest Field | Seattle Sounders FC | 0–1 | Portland Timbers | 18,606 | Tied 1–2–0 | |
| 2011 | March 4 | Cascadia Summit | Starfire Sports Complex | Seattle Sounders FC | 0–2 | Portland Timbers | 3,100 | POR 2–2–0 | |
| 2022 | January 26 | Desert Showcase | Kino Sports Complex | Portland Timbers | 0–0 | Seattle Sounders FC | 2,000 | POR 2–2–1 | |

=== Western Conference standings finishes ===
Sounders Timbers

| P. | 2011 | 2012 | 2013 | 2014 | 2015 | 2016 | 2017 | 2018 | 2019 | 2020 | 2021 | 2022 | 2023 | 2024 | 2025 |
|---|---|---|---|---|---|---|---|---|---|---|---|---|---|---|---|
| 1 | | | 1 | 1 | | | 1 | | | | | | | | |
| 2 | 2 | | | | | | 2 | 2 | 2 | 2 | 2 | | 2 | | |
| 3 | | 3 | | | 3 | | | | | 3 | | | | | |
| 4 | | | 4 | | 4 | 4 | | | | | 4 | | | 4 | |
| 5 | | | | | | | | 5 | | | | | | | 5 |
| 6 | 6 | | | 6 | | | | | 6 | | | | | | |
| 7 | | | | | | 7 | | | | | | | | | |
| 8 | | 8 | | | | | | | | | | 8 | | | 8 |
| 9 | | | | | | | | | | | | | | 9 | |
| 10 | | | | | | | | | | | | | 10 | | |
| 11 | | | | | | | | | | | | 11 | | | |
| 12 | | | | | | | | | | | | | | | |
| 13 | | | | | | | | | | | | | | | |
| 14 | | | | | | | | | | | | | | | |
| 15 | | | | | | | | | | | | | | | |

• Total: Seattle with 11 higher finishes, Portland with 4.

== See also ==
- Portland–Seattle rivalry
  - Portland Thorns–Seattle Reign rivalry
  - I-5 rivalry
- Portland Timbers–Vancouver Whitecaps rivalry
- Seattle Sounders–Vancouver Whitecaps rivalry
