= David Alt =

- Born: September 17, 1933; St. Louis, Missouri, United States
- Died: April 26, 2015 (aged 81); Missoula, Montana, United States
- Occupation(s): Author, geologist

David Alt (September 17, 1933 – April 26, 2015) was an American geologist, teacher, writer, storyteller and author.

== Career ==
Alt was the author of more than thirty books, including several titles in the Roadside Geology series published by Mountain Press.

He earned his Ph.D. in 1961 from the University of Texas, and joined the Department of Geology at The University of Montana in Missoula, Montana in 1965. He became professor Emeritus at The University of Montana in 2002.

He died on April 26, 2015, in Missoula.

== Lake Missoula Floods ==
Alt helped to interpret and explain to a wide audience the cataclysmic glacial Missoula Floods through articles and his book Glacial Lake Missoula and Its Humongous Floods (Mountain Press, 2001. ISBN 978-0878424153).
