= G. Thomas Edwards =

American historian (1931–2018)

- Born: Glenn Thomas Edwards; June 14, 1931
- Died: October 7, 2018 (aged 87)
- Occupations: Historian; professor

Glenn Thomas Edwards (June 14, 1931 – October 7, 2018) was an American historian. He taught at Whitman College from 1964 to 1998, and was named the William Kirkman Professor of History.
