= Ricardo Cobo =

Ricardo Cobo may refer to:

- Ricardo Cobo (politician)
- Ricardo Cobo (musician)
