= Grande Ronde River Bridge =

- U.S. National Register of Historic Places
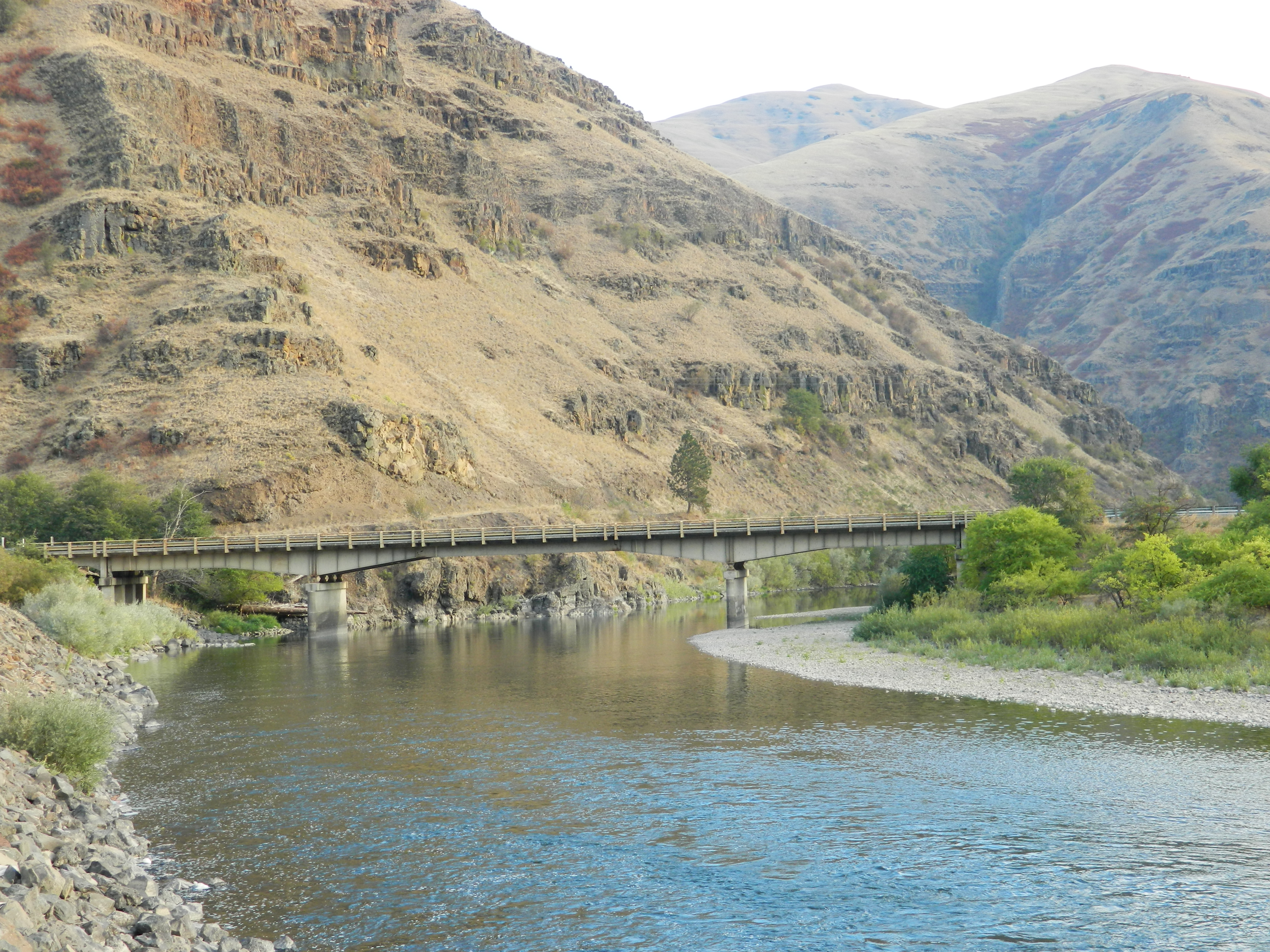

- Location within Washington (state) Location within the United States
- Location: On State Route 129, about 23 miles (37 km) southwest of Asotin
- Nearest city: Asotin, Washington
- Coordinates: 46°02′30″N 117°15′09″W
- Area: less than one acre
- Built: 1941
- Built by: Washington State Highway Department; Henry Hagman; Clinton Bridge Company
- Engineer: R. W. Finke
- Architectural style: Riveted Steel Girder
- MPS: Bridges of Washington State MPS
- NRHP reference No.: 95000262
- Added to NRHP: March 28, 1995

The Grande Ronde River Bridge, near Asotin in Asotin County in southeast Washington, is a riveted steel girder bridge which was built in 1941. It is notable as the first, or one of the first, steel girder bridges in the Washington State highway system, and was a prototype for later ones. It was listed on the National Register of Historic Places in 1995.

It brings Washington State Route 129 over the Grande Ronde River, about 13 miles (21 km) south of Anatone, Washington and 23 miles (37 km) southwest of Asotin. It is 283 feet (86 m) long in total, with a center suspended span 55 feet (17 m) long between two 30 feet (9.1 m) cantilever spans. On each side is a 24 feet (7.3 m) reinforced concrete T-beam approach span and a steel anchor arm span 60 feet (18 m) long.

It was built for the Washington State Highway Department by contractor Henry Hagman using steel fabricated by the Clinton Bridge Company of Clinton, Iowa. R. W. Finke was the bridge engineer.

Its NRHP nomination states:

Although the bridge is lacking overt artistic features, its design is particularly appropriate to the unique character of the location. The simple horizontal lines of the bridge complement the basalt outcrops rising abruptly in layered formations from the valley floor. The bridge's configuration and type of construction appear to have been an excellent engineering solution for this particular river crossing.
