= Washington State Route 129 =

State highway in Asotin County, Washington, US

State Route 129
- A map of Asotin County with SR 129 highlighted in red

Route information
- Maintained by WSDOT
- Length: 42.55 mi (68.48 km)
- Existed: 1964–present

Major junctions
- South end: OR 3 at Oregon state line near Anatone
- North end: US 12 in Clarkston

Location
- Country: United States
- State: Washington
- Counties: Asotin

Highway system
- State highways in Washington; Interstate; US; State; Scenic; Pre-1964; 1964 renumbering; Former
← SR 128	→ SR 131

State Route 129 (SR 129) is a state highway in Asotin County, Washington, United States. It travels north–south at the southeastern corner of the state, connecting with Oregon Route 3 (OR 3) at the Oregon state line south of Anatone. The 43-mile (69 km) highway then follows the Snake River, which marks the Idaho state border, north to Clarkston and terminates at U.S. Route 12 (US 12). SR 129 also has a short spur route that connects to a separate intersection with US 12 in Clarkston.

The highway primarily serves as a connection between Clarkston, Asotin, and Enterprise, Oregon. An existing road connecting Clarkston to Asotin was incorporated into the state highway system in 1923 as a branch of State Road 3 and extended south to the Oregon border as part of Primary State Highway 3 in the 1940s. During the 1964 state highway renumbering, the Clarkston branch of PSH 3 was split into SR 128 and SR 129.

== Route description ==
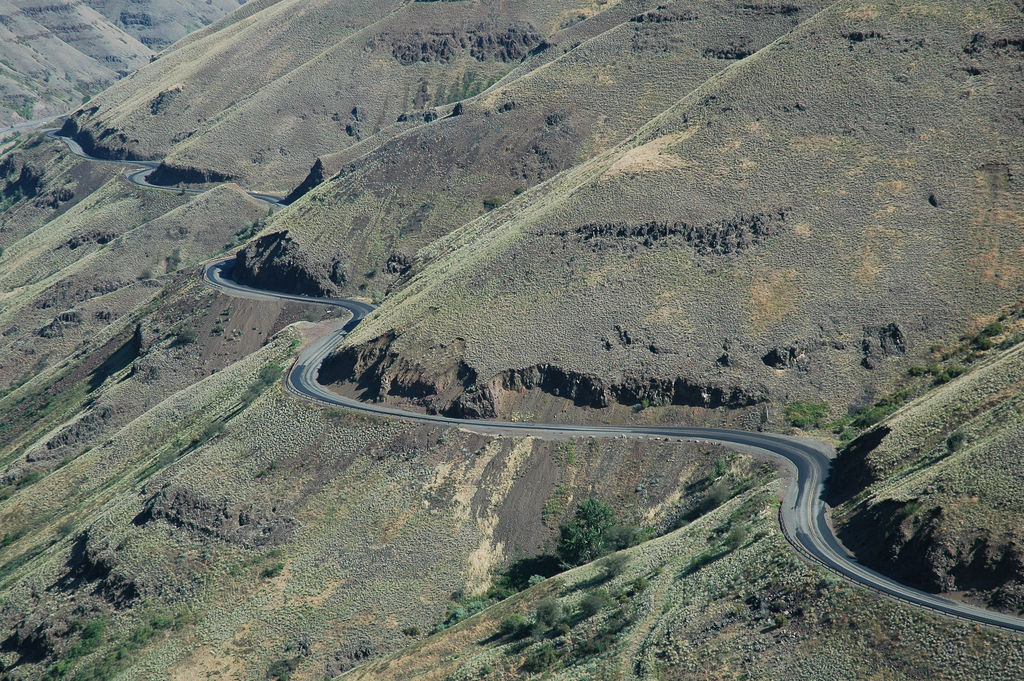
SR 129 near Fields Spring State Park

SR 129 begins at the Oregon state line near Flora, Oregon, as a continuation of OR 3, which travels south towards Enterprise, the seat of Wallowa County, Oregon. The highway travels north along the east side of Buford Canyon and makes a switchback turn to the south to cross Buford Canyon on the north side of the state line. SR 129 then makes another switchback turn and travels north along the west side of Buford Creek, following the canyon below Buford Ridge. After approximately 3 miles (5 km), the highway crosses over the Grande Ronde River and enters the bottom of Rattlesnake Canyon, which it follows northeast towards a fork in the stream. SR 129 then turns south at a switchback and begins ascending from the canyon floor on Rattlesnake Grade, making nine turns and reaching an elevation of 2,400 feet (730 m).

The highway continues northeast along a ridge overlooking Rattlesnake Creek and passes through a forested area around Fields Spring State Park, a recreation area near Rattlesnake Summit at an elevation of 3,965 feet (1,209 m). SR 129 makes a gradual turn to the north and enters the rural plateau on which the community of Anatone sits. The highway then travels northeast along Mill Creek and Ayers Gulch, making a brief turn due east near Dwight Halsey Road before continuing north towards Asotin. On the southern outskirts of the city, SR 129 begins a series of switchback turns while descending from the plateau towards Hells Canyon on the Snake River. The roadway turns south and crosses a gully while turning northwesterly; it then makes a sharp turn to the east after passing the city cemetery and continues through another zig-zag turn before reaching the Asotin city limits.

SR 129 enters Asotin near the county fairgrounds and meanders around a residential neighborhood before turning north onto Washington Street at the east end of downtown. The highway then turns west onto 1st Street, passing north of the downtown strip and the county courthouse. 1st Street remains parallel to the Snake River, accessed via Chief Looking Glass Park on the city's waterfront, and SR 129 continues northwest out of the city along the river as Riverside Drive. The highway continues northeast along the river bank and a parallel bicycle path towards Clarkston, passing downhill from residential areas on the west and the Lewiston–Nez Perce County Airport to the east in Idaho.

At the south end of Clarkston near Swallows Park, SR 129 intersects Fleshman Way in a dogbone interchange on the western approach to the Southway Bridge. Fleshman Way passes over SR 129 and continues west towards former SR 128 and east across the Snake River to Lewiston, Idaho. The highway continues north from the interchange and enters Clarkston city limits, becoming 5th Street before cutting across to 6th Street. The street passes through downtown Clarkston and splits from 6th Street to follow Diagonal Street as it runs four blocks northeast towards US 12. SR 129 terminates a half-block from the Idaho state line at the intersection with US 12, which provides eastbound connections to downtown Lewiston on Bridge Street; the remaining two-block section of 6th Street is signed as SR 129 Spur and provides connections to westbound US 12.

SR 129 is the southeasternmost highway in Washington state and is maintained by the Washington State Department of Transportation (WSDOT). Most of the rural highway is two lanes wide, with no shoulder, and has a posted speed limit of 50 to 55 miles per hour (80 to 89 km/h) outside of towns and cities. WSDOT conducts an annual survey on state highways to measure traffic volume in terms of annual average daily traffic. Average traffic volumes on SR 129 in 2016 ranged from a minimum of 180 vehicles near the Oregon state line to a maximum of 9,800 in downtown Clarkston.

== History ==
The road connecting Asotin and Clarkston along the Snake River was constructed by the early 1910s and added to the state highway system in 1923 as a branch of State Road 3. The highway branch was later transferred to Primary State Highway 3 in 1937 and split into two highways: one that traveled west from Clarkston to Pomeroy, and another that extended the Asotin road south to the Oregon state line. While an unpaved road had existed along the Oregon extension by the 1920s, a permanent highway was not completed until the 1940s. The Grande Ronde River Bridge opened in 1941 to carry the highway over the Grand Ronde River south of Anatone and was among the first in the state to use steel girders. The Clarkston–Oregon branch of PSH 3 was re-designated as SR 129 in 1964 as part of a statewide highway renumbering.

The Southway Bridge between Clarkston and Lewiston was completed in 1981 by the U.S. Army Corps of Engineers and is maintained by the Asotin and Nez Perce county governments. The bridge's western approach originally terminated SR 129 until Fleshman Way was completed in October 1997. The interchange with SR 129 was reconstructed by the Asotin county government in 2017 at a cost of $4.5 million, adding two roundabouts to replace dangerous ramps.

== Spur route ==
State Route 129 Spur
- Location: Clarkston
- Length: 0.25 mi (400 m)
- Existed: 1970–present

SR 129 has a short spur route near its northern terminus in Clarkston that connects it to westbound US 12. The spur route travels for 0.25 miles (0.40 km) on a two-block section of 6th Street in downtown Clarkston from Maple and Diagonal streets to Bridge Street (US 12). It has an average daily traffic of 2,100 to 2,500 vehicles, according to a WSDOT survey conducted in 2016.

== Major intersections ==
The entire highway is in Asotin County.

Location	mi	km	Destinations	Notes
	0.00	0.00	OR 3 – Enterprise	Continuation beyond Oregon state line
	40.84	65.73	Fleshman Way (Southway Bridge) – Lewiston	Interchange
Clarkston	42.17	67.87	SR 129 Spur to US 12 west – Walla Walla	
Clarkston	42.55	68.48	US 12 east – Lewiston	Northern terminus
1.000 mi = 1.609 km; 1.000 km = 0.621 mi
