= Oregon Route 3 =

State highway in Wallowa County, Oregon, US

Oregon Route 3
- Route 3 highlighted in red

Route information
- Maintained by ODOT
- Length: 43.13 mi (69.41 km)
- Existed: 1932–present
- Component highways: Enterprise–Lewiston Highway No. 11

Major junctions
- South end: OR 82 in Enterprise
- North end: SR 129 near Flora

Location
- Country: United States
- State: Oregon
- Counties: Wallowa

Highway system
- Oregon Highways; Interstate; US; State; Named; Scenic
← US 730	→ I-5

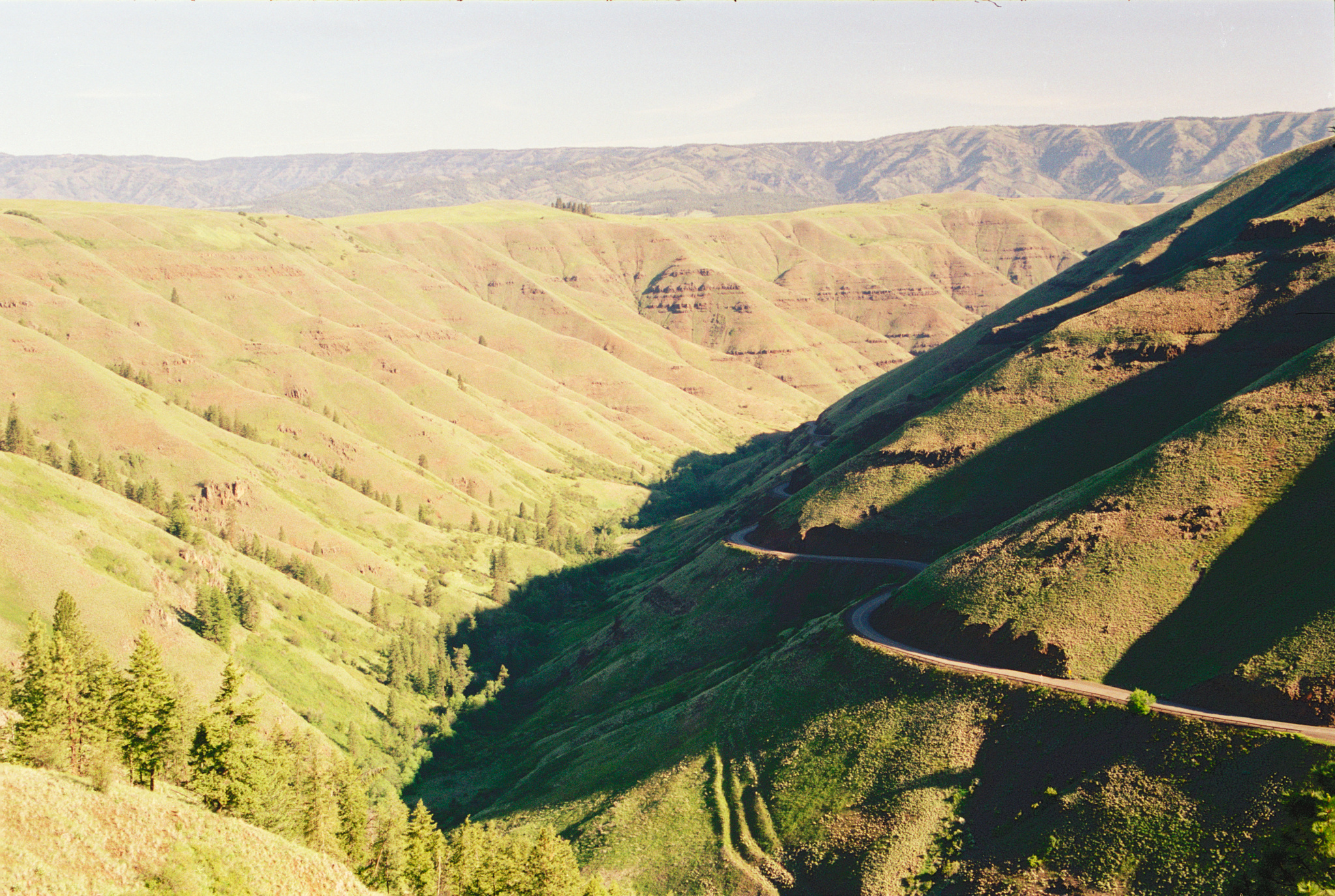
Oregon Route 3

Oregon Route 3 is a state highway in the U.S. state of Oregon. It is located entirely within Wallowa County. OR 3 is the lowest numbered highway in the state of Oregon, of any type (state, federal, or Interstate). OR 3 traverses the Enterprise–Lewiston Highway No. 11 of the Oregon state highway system.

== Route description ==
OR 3 has its southern terminus at a junction with Oregon Route 82 in the city of Enterprise. It runs north/south, passing near the small community of Flora. It terminates at the Washington border. The route continues north through Anatone and Asotin, Washington and into Clarkston, Washington as State Route 129. From Clarkston, U.S. Route 12 provides direct access to Lewiston, Idaho.

== History ==
An earlier routing passed through the community of Paradise, located east of the highway's current location. The highway was numbered to match Washington State Route 129, which had been a branch of Primary State Highway 3, and its predecessor State Road 3, from 1923 to 1964.

== Major intersections ==
Milepoints are as reported by ODOT and do not necessarily reflect current mileage. Z indicates overlapping mileage due to construction longer than established route, and – indicates negative mileage behind established beginning point. Segments that are locally maintained may be omitted. For routes traversing multiple named state highways, each milepoint is preceded by the corresponding state highway number. The entire route is in Wallowa County.

Location	Milepoint	Destinations	Notes
Enterprise	43.19	OR 82 – Elgin, La Grande, Joseph, Wallowa Lake	
	23.49	Summit, elevation 4,693 feet (1,430 m)	
	13.37	Joseph Creek Canyon viewpoint	
	0.00	SR 129	Continuation into Washington
1.000 mi = 1.609 km; 1.000 km = 0.621 mi
