= Interstate Highway Bridge =

U.S. highway bridge between Clarkston, Washington and Lewiston, Idaho

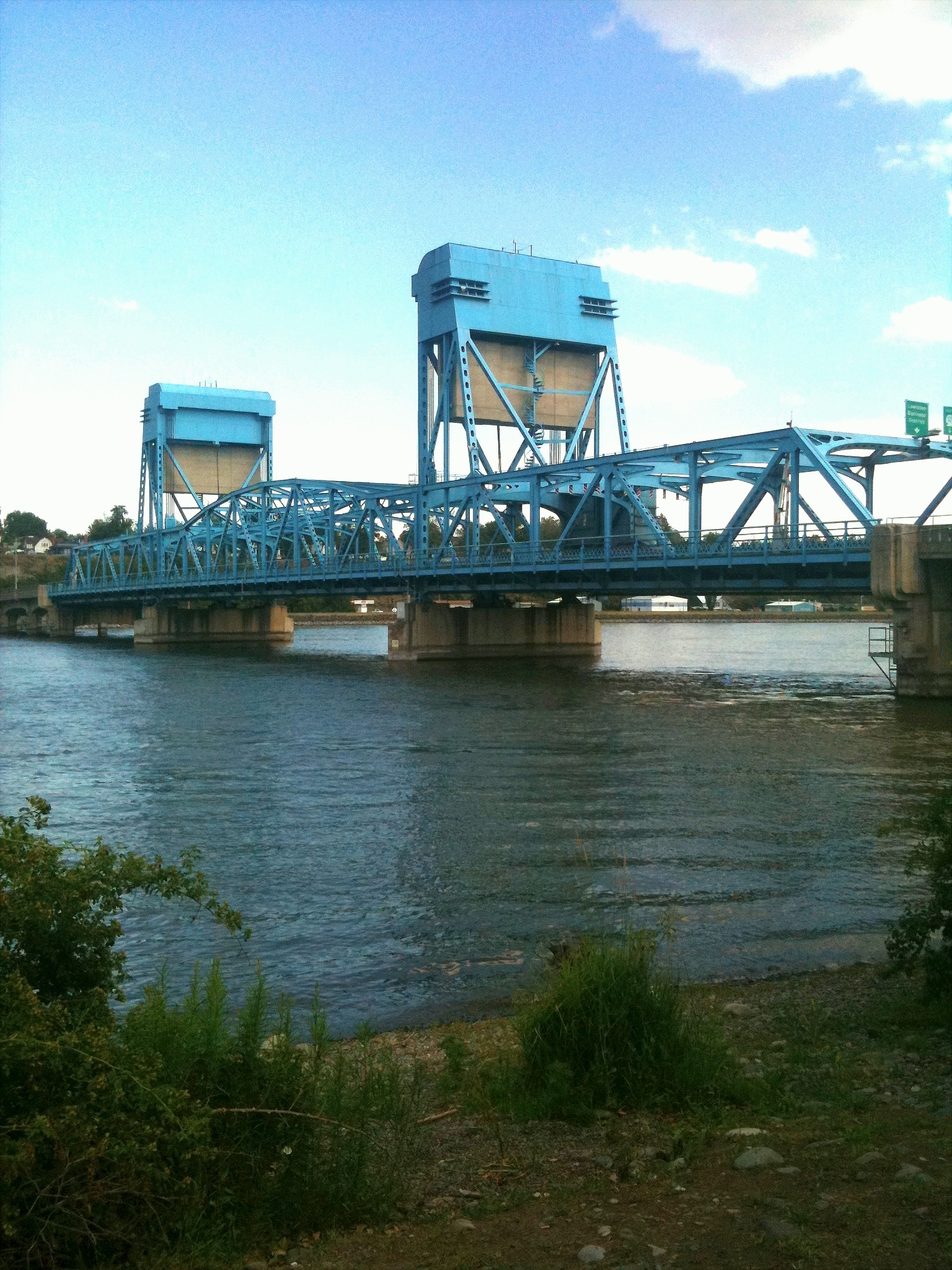
- Looking at the northern side of the Interstate Highway Bridge from Clarkston, Washington
- Coordinates: 46°25′13″N 117°02′11″W
- Carries: US 12 (4 lanes)
- Locale: Clarkston, Washington and Lewiston, Idaho
- Maintained by: Washington State Department of Transportation

Characteristics
- Design: Vertical Lift Truss

Location
- Interactive map of Interstate Highway Bridge

The Interstate Highway Bridge crosses the Snake River, between Clarkston, Washington and Lewiston, Idaho. The bridge carries U.S. Route 12 (US 12) across the state line between Washington and Idaho, and is maintained by the Washington State Department of Transportation. It was built in 1939 and is 1,424 feet (434 m) long. It is nicknamed the "Blue Bridge" locally.

The bridge was the primary route between Lewiston and Clarkston, until the Southway Bridge was constructed in the 1980s.

== Gallery ==
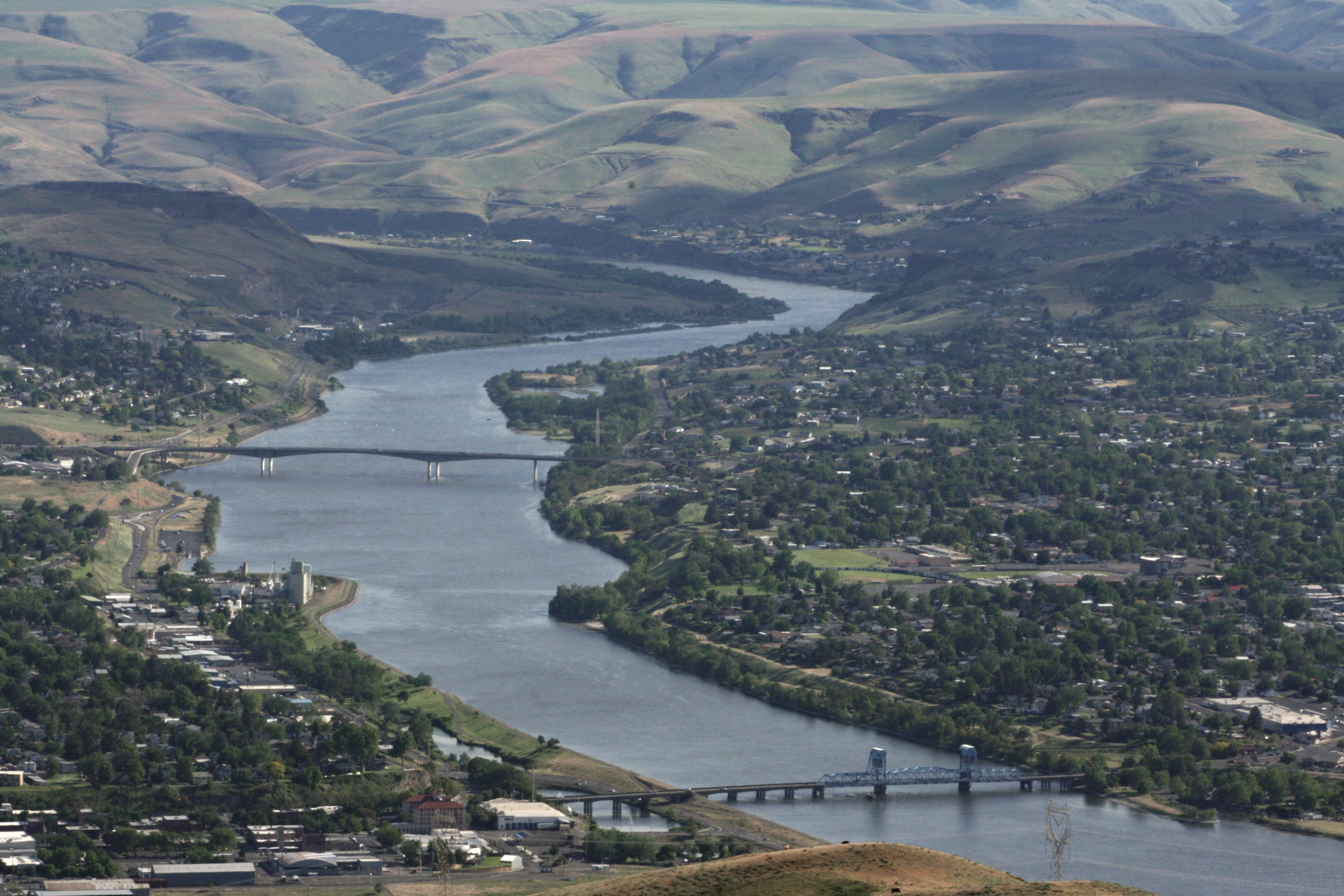
A telephoto view of the Snake River dividing Lewiston, Idaho and Clarkston, Washington. The photographer is atop Lewiston Hill, looking south. The Interstate Highway Bridge is the closer of the two bridges. The Southway Bridge is in the distance.

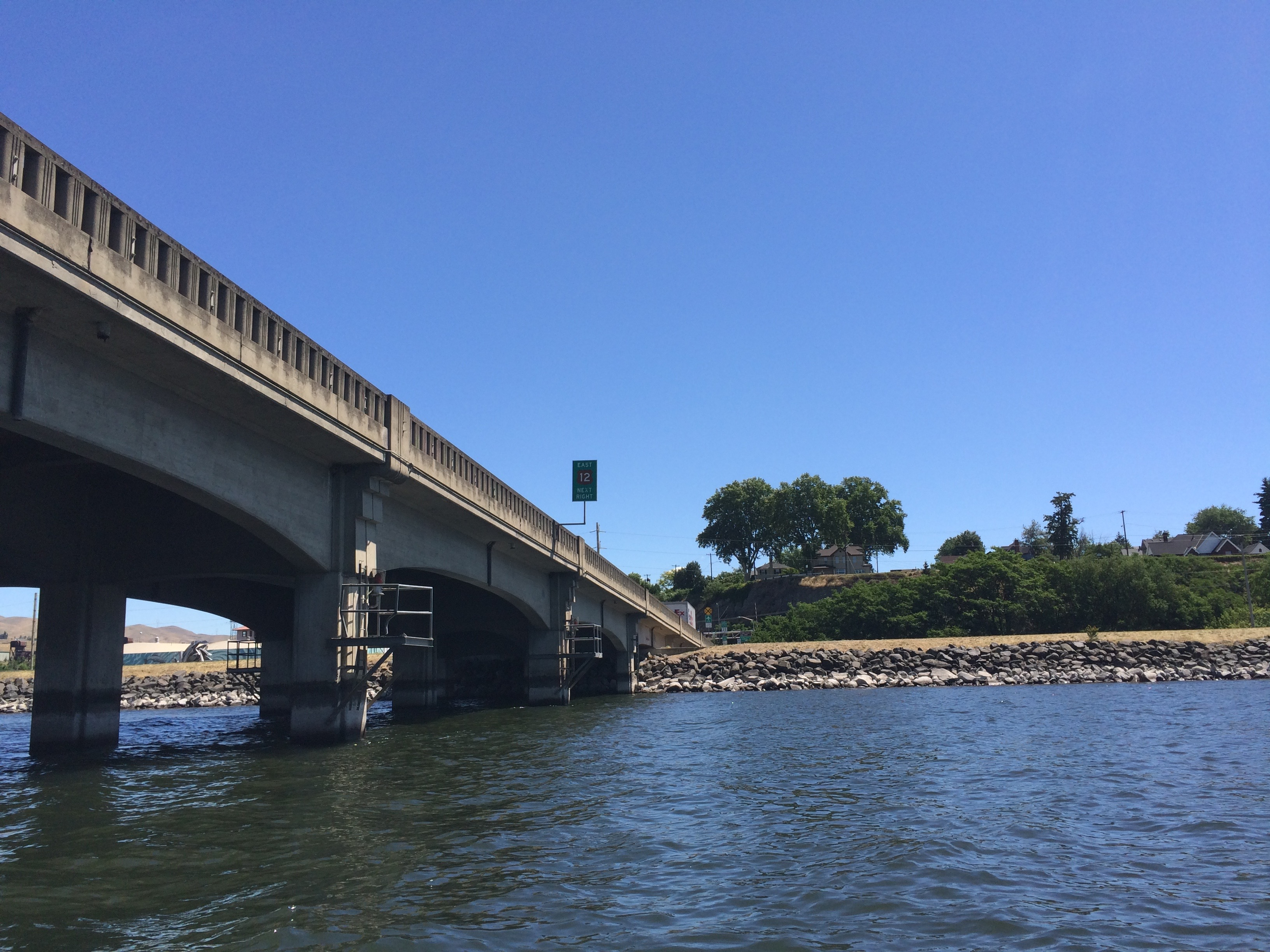
Looking east toward Idaho, from underneath the bridge

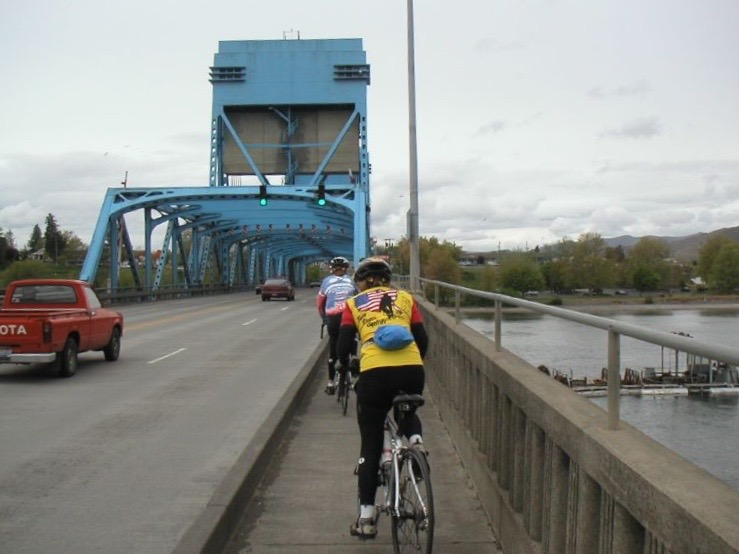
Crossing westbound into Clarkston via bicycle

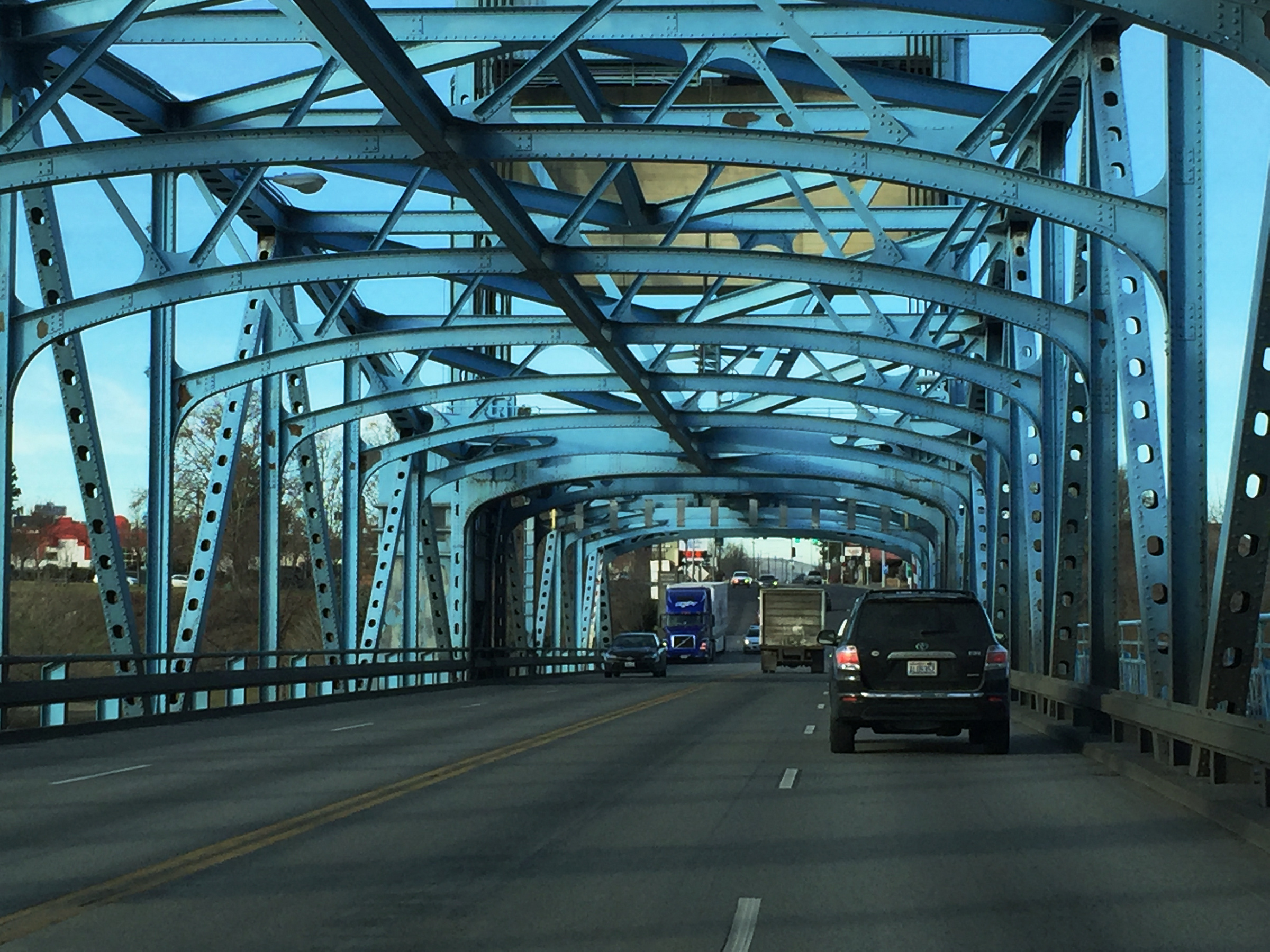
Westbound vehicles entering Washington state

== See also ==
- Lower Granite Lake
