= Paradise, Oregon =

Unincorporated community in the state of Oregon, United States

Coordinates: 45.938205°N 117.221827°W

Paradise is an unincorporated community in Wallowa County, Oregon, United States, about three miles east of Oregon Route 3 and about six miles south of the Oregon-Washington border. It is located on a plateau that overlooks Joseph Canyon. The closest incorporated cities are Enterprise, Oregon and Asotin, Washington at 40 and 45 miles away, respectively. Its elevation is 4114 feet (1254 m).

Paradise formerly had a post office that ran from 1889 to 1942. Paradise was named by Wallowa Valley ranchers Sam Wade, Pres Halley and William Masterson, who entered the area in October 1878 while looking for winter range for their cattle. When they returned to the valley, they told the other settlers of the fine grass available in the "regular paradise" they found. That November, settlers brought a thousand head of cattle to the new range, but the winter was severe and many cattle were lost.

Oregon Route 3 formerly passed through Paradise.
