= Joseph Canyon =

Basalt canyon in the United States

Coordinates: 46°00′31″N 117°02′39″W

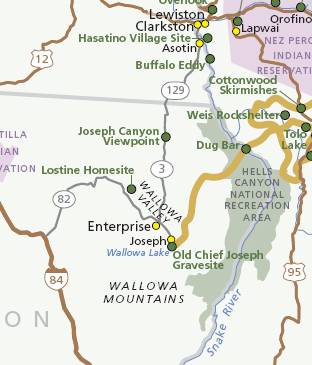
Location in northeastern Oregon, near the Washington and Idaho borders

Joseph Canyon (Nez Perce: an-an-a-soc-um, meaning "long, rough canyon") is a 2,000-foot (610 m)-deep basalt canyon in northern Wallowa County, Oregon, and southern Asotin County, Washington, United States.

== Geography ==
Joseph Canyon contains Joseph Creek, a tributary of the Grande Ronde River, which flows into the Snake River, a tributary of the Columbia. The geology is typical of the Columbia Plateau, formed by the Columbia River Basalt Group, and the exposed canyon walls provide a striking view of flood basalt flows and dikes. The canyon floor contains sediments deposited by the Missoula Floods.

== History ==
The canyon was named after Chief Joseph of the Nez Perce, who is traditionally thought to have been born in a cave on the east bank of Joseph Creek in Asotin County. Prior to European settlement, the Nez Perce used the canyon bottomlands as a travel corridor from summer camp sites in the Wallowa valley to winter camp sites along the Grande Ronde and Snake rivers. Elk, bighorn sheep, and mule deer were plentiful, as well as native plant foods associated with bunchgrass habitat. In later centuries, the Nez Perce grazed horses on the canyon grasslands. Beginning in the late 19th century, pioneer settlers homesteaded in the area, grazing sheep and cattle and planting fruit orchards. However, the rocky terrain prohibited extensive agricultural production.

== Conservation ==
In the late 1990s, the Nez Perce tribe acquired 15,000 acres (61 km^{2}) in the Joseph Creek watershed for conservation. The lands currently provide wildlife habitat for two federally listed threatened species, the bald eagle and the Snake River steelhead, and may provide habitat for the threatened lynx, Townsend's big-eared bat, and mountain quail. Several threatened plant species are also known to exist in the area, including Macfarlane's four-o’clock and Spalding's catchfly. Non-threatened species include bighorn sheep, elk, mule deer, blue grouse, golden eagles, and red-tailed hawks.

=== Access ===
The Joseph Canyon Viewpoint, at a highway pullout along Oregon Route 3, is one of 38 sites that form the Nez Perce National Historical Park. The viewpoint is located approximately 30 miles (48 km) north of Enterprise, Oregon, and 11 miles (18 km) south of the Washington border, in the Wallowa–Whitman National Forest.

The canyon itself is private land of the Nez Perce Tribe, and is used for ranching, hunting, and some grain crops. Other viewpoints include Fields Spring State Park.

== Images ==
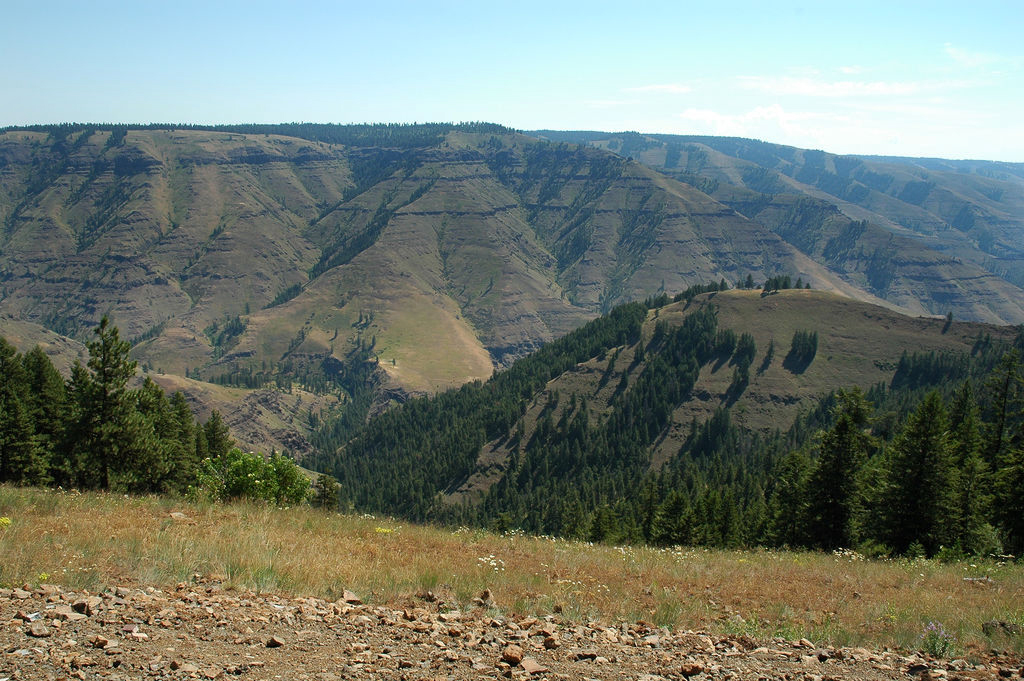
Joseph Canyon as seen from Oregon Route 3

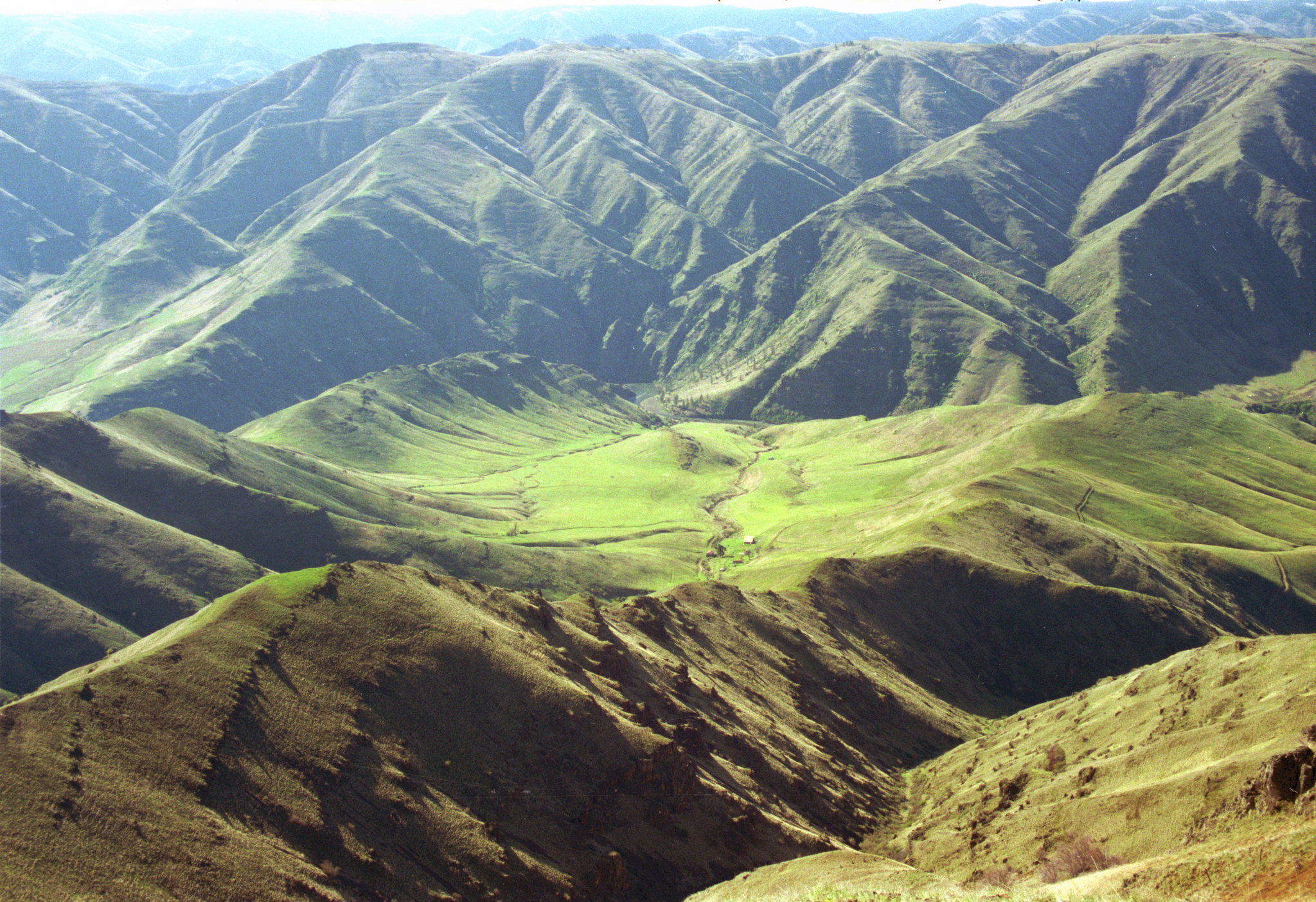
The canyon as seen from Fields Spring State Park

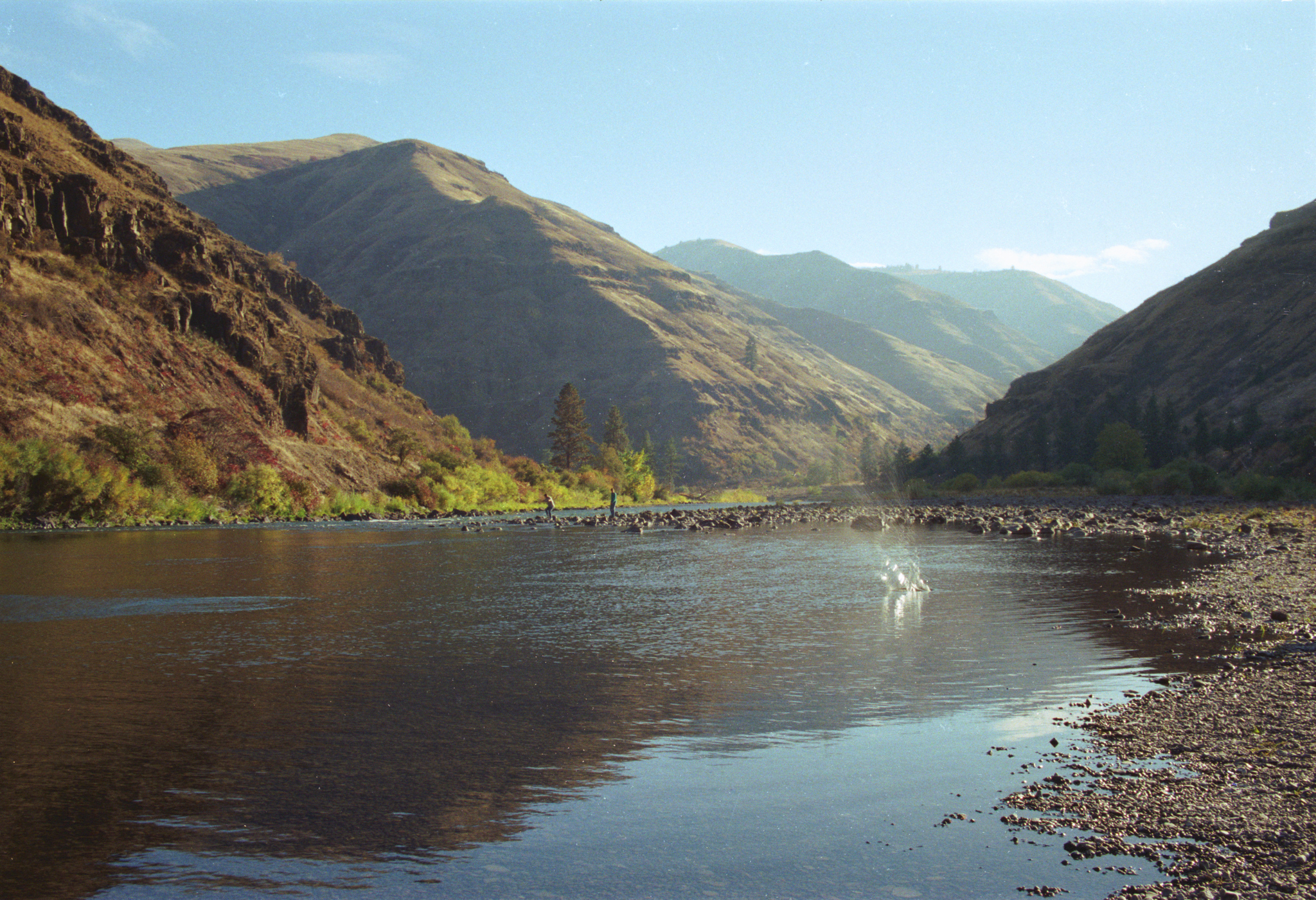
Grande Ronde River in Joseph Canyon
