= Southway Bridge =

Coordinates: 46°23′44.51″N 117°2′26.99″W

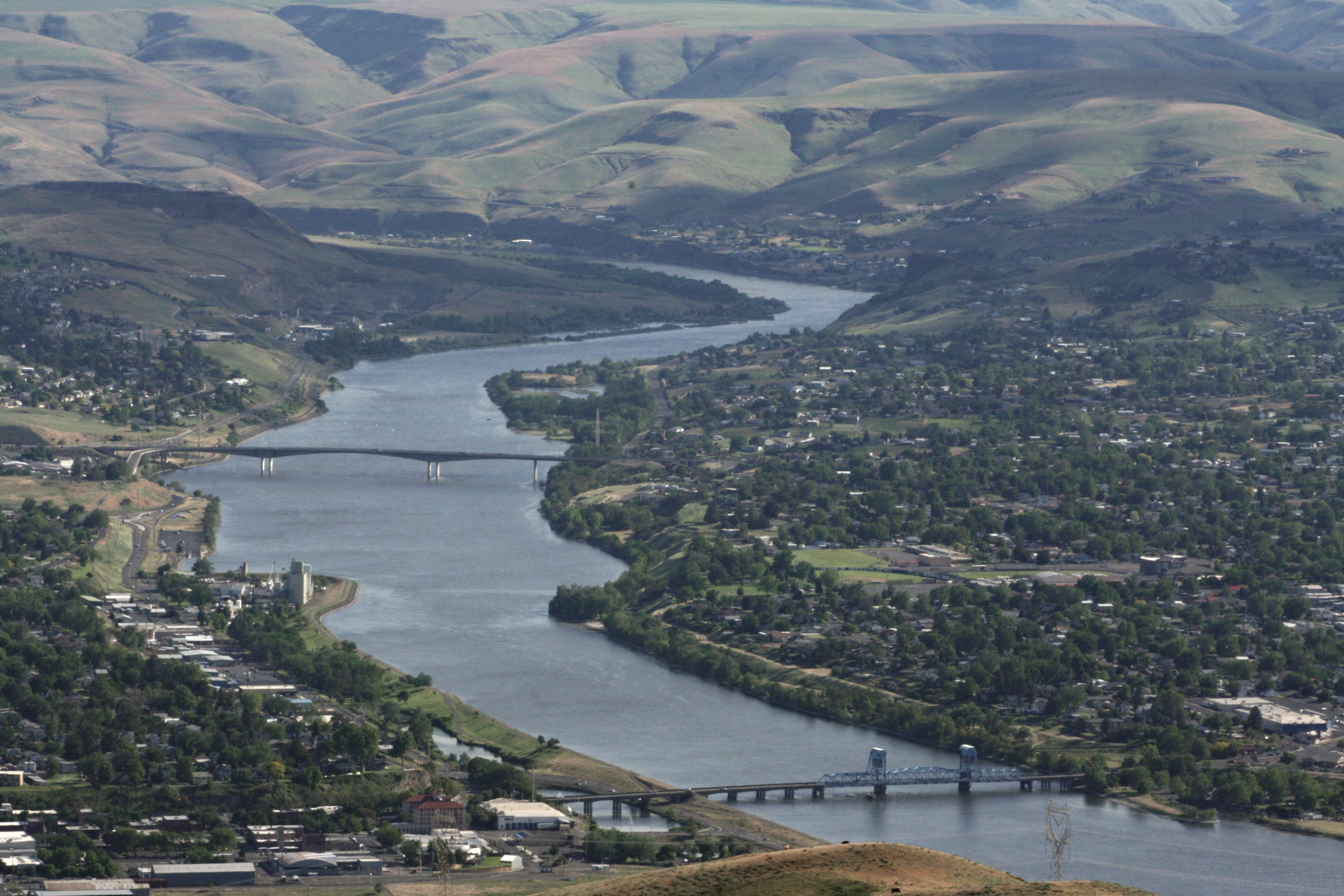
The Southway Bridge near the center of the photograph, with the blue Interstate Highway Bridge at the bottom of the photo

The Southway Bridge is a highway bridge spanning the Snake River between Clarkston, Washington, and Lewiston, Idaho. It connects Fleshman Way in Clarkston with Bryden Canyon Road in Lewiston, and provides residents of the Lewiston Orchards with access to State Route 129, as well as providing Clarkston residents with access to the Lewiston–Nez Perce County Airport. The bridge was opened to traffic on August 3, 1982, at a cost of $21 million, after several delays due to repairs. The Bryden County Road project linking the bridge to the Lewiston Orchards was completed in 1999.

The bridge was built to supplement the Interstate Highway Bridge (nicknamed the "Blue Bridge") to the north, which was sometimes closed to traffic while the bridge was raised to allow large boats to cross underneath.

== Funding ==
A bill to fund the bridge (titled "S. 3563. A bill to authorize the construction of a highway bridge across the Snake River between Clarkston, Washington and Lewiston, Idaho") was introduced in June 1974 by Senators Warren Magnuson, Henry M. Jackson, Frank Church. and James McClure. In the senators' testimony, they cited the inadequacy of the Interstate Highway Bridge for the modern vehicular traffic of the time, and shared concerns about the creation of the new reservoir in the coming years (created by the Lower Granite Dam) which would result in traffic delays due to increased boat traffic under the bridge requiring the raising of the 1939 bridge.

The Lower Granite Dam was completed in 1975, creating a reservoir (Lower Granite Lake) that extended through the Lewiston–Clarkston metropolitan area, raising the surfaces of the Snake River and Clearwater River to 741 feet (226 meters) above sea level.
