= Flora School =

- U.S. National Register of Historic Places
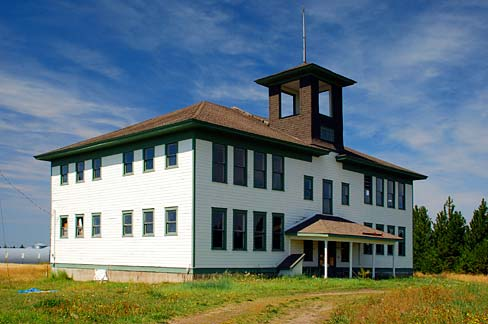
- The former Flora School building in 2009

- Location within Oregon Location within the United States
- Location: 82744 Church St., Flora, Oregon
- Coordinates: 45°54′03″N 117°18′37″W
- Area: 3.4 acres (1.4 ha)
- Built: 1915
- Architectural style: Bungalow/craftsman
- NRHP reference No.: 97000579
- Added to NRHP: June 13, 1997

The Flora School, at 82744 Church St. in Flora, Oregon, is a historic Bungalow/craftsman-style former school building that is listed on the National Register of Historic Places (NRHP). Built in 1915, it was deemed significant for association with education and the community, and for its architecture. It is a 52-by-80-foot (16 m × 24 m) building that, at the time of its 1996 NRHP nomination, had been vacant since 1977 and then had a weathered condition. It was added to the NRHP in 1997.
