= Edward Stephenson (musician) =

Canadian guitarist (born 1976)

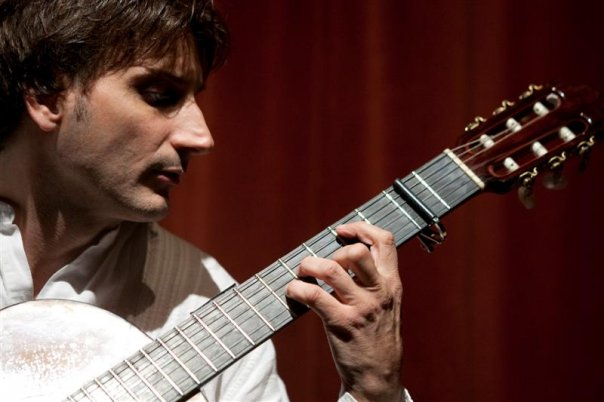
- Stephenson in 2013
- Born: 12 August 1976; Toronto, Canada
- Other names: Eduardo de Rosamaria; Ed Stephenson and the Paco Band
- Occupation: classical flamenco guitarist

Edward Stephenson (born 12 August 1976) is a Canadian flamenco guitarist who has toured throughout North America since he was sixteen. He is also the founder of the Paco Band, the North Carolina Guitar Quartet, and the Stephenson Guitar Quartet.

== Life and career ==
=== Early years ===
Stephenson was born on 12 August 1976, in Toronto. He is the son of Edward Peter Stephenson, who passed when he was nine years of age. His mother, Rosemarie, raised him and his sister Darlene until she remarried to Robert Grinton when Ed was thirteen. In his early teens, Ed won the Canadian Music Competition and the Kiwanis Music Competition. His early studies were with Ivan Maracle in Toronto, Canada who prepared Ed for his audition for Aaron Shearer at the Peabody Conservatory. He started his collegiate studies at the Peabody Conservatory, in Baltimore, Maryland, as an undergraduate student. Later, he relocated to North Carolina to complete his degree at the University of North Carolina School of the Arts under the direction of Aaron Shearer.

Stephenson performed at the grand opening of the Stevens Center in Winston-Salem under the direction of Leonard Bernstein, with Isaac Stern as the soloist, and Gregory Peck as the master of ceremonies. Guests in attendance included Agnes de Mille, Cliff Robertson, Governor James Hunt, President Gerald Ford and Lady Bird Johnson.

Edward Stephenson was a recipient of the University of North Carolina School of the Arts Special Award in Music (1995)

Stephenson has performed with the North Carolina Symphony, the Raleigh Symphony, the North Carolina Theater, North Carolina Bach Festival, and the Raleigh Ringers.

Stephenson has a cameo appearance on the reality TV show Lizard Lick Towing in 2014.

Stephenson has held faculty positions at Meredith College in Raleigh, North Carolina Methodist University in Fayetteville, North Carolina and University of Mount Olive in Mount Olive, North Carolina.

== Discography ==
- KYPOYKA - Ukrainian Children's Songs and Stories
- Winter Branches - North Carolina Guitar quartet(Liscio Recordings) (1997)
- "INO" Live - Ed Stephenson and the Paco band (2008)
- Vivaldi Concerto in D major - Ed Stephenson (2009)
- Esencia - Ed Stephenson and the Paco band (Liscio Recordings) (2011)
- A Paco Band Christmas - Ed Stephenson and the Paco band (2014)
- Rosamaria - Ed Stephenson and the Paco band (2015)
- Eduardo de Rosamaria Cuarteto de Guitarras (2026)
