= Aaron Shearer =

American guitarist (1919–2008)

Aaron Shearer (6 September 1919 – 21 April 2008) was an American classical guitarist known primarily as a pedagogue.

== History ==
He was born in Anatone, Washington to Nettie Pearl Moody and Floyd David Shearer, and was a guitar pupil of Sophocles Papas.

He has been director of the guitar programs at both Peabody Conservatory and North Carolina School of the Arts. He held an honorary doctorate from Duquesne University where he was a faculty member at the Mary Pappert School of Music from 1996 till his death in 2008.

His former students include Manuel Barrueco, Ricardo Cobo, David Tanenbaum, Thomas Kikta, David Starobin, Bruce Casteel, Christopher Berg and Edward Stephenson.

Shearer has many publications, including his well-known Classical Guitar Technique method books, his three-volume Learning the Classic Guitar series and his newly released The Shearer Method-Classic Guitar Foundation with DVD and CD.

== Family ==
He was the son of Floyd and Nettie Moody Shearer. Aaron had two older brothers, Buford Carl Shearer who died in 1988 and Gwen Dean Shearer who died in 1987.

== Selected publications ==
- The Shearer Method- Classic Guitar Foundations - with DVD and CD (2012)
- "Aaron Shearer: A Life With The Guitar-DVD" (2004)
- Learning the Classic Guitar - Part 1 (1990)
- Learning the Classic Guitar - Part 2 (1990)
- Learning the Classic Guitar - Part 3 (1991)
- Slur, Ornament, and Reach Development Exercises - Supplement 1 (1960)
- Basic Elements of Music Theory for the Guitar - Supplement 2 (1965)
- Scale Pattern Studies for Guitar - Supplement 3 (1965)
- Classic Guitar Technique - Volume I (1963)
- Classic Guitar Technique - Volume II (1969)
- Guitar Note Speller (1959)
- Three Tremolo Studies for Guitar Solo (1965)
