= Lower Granite Lake =

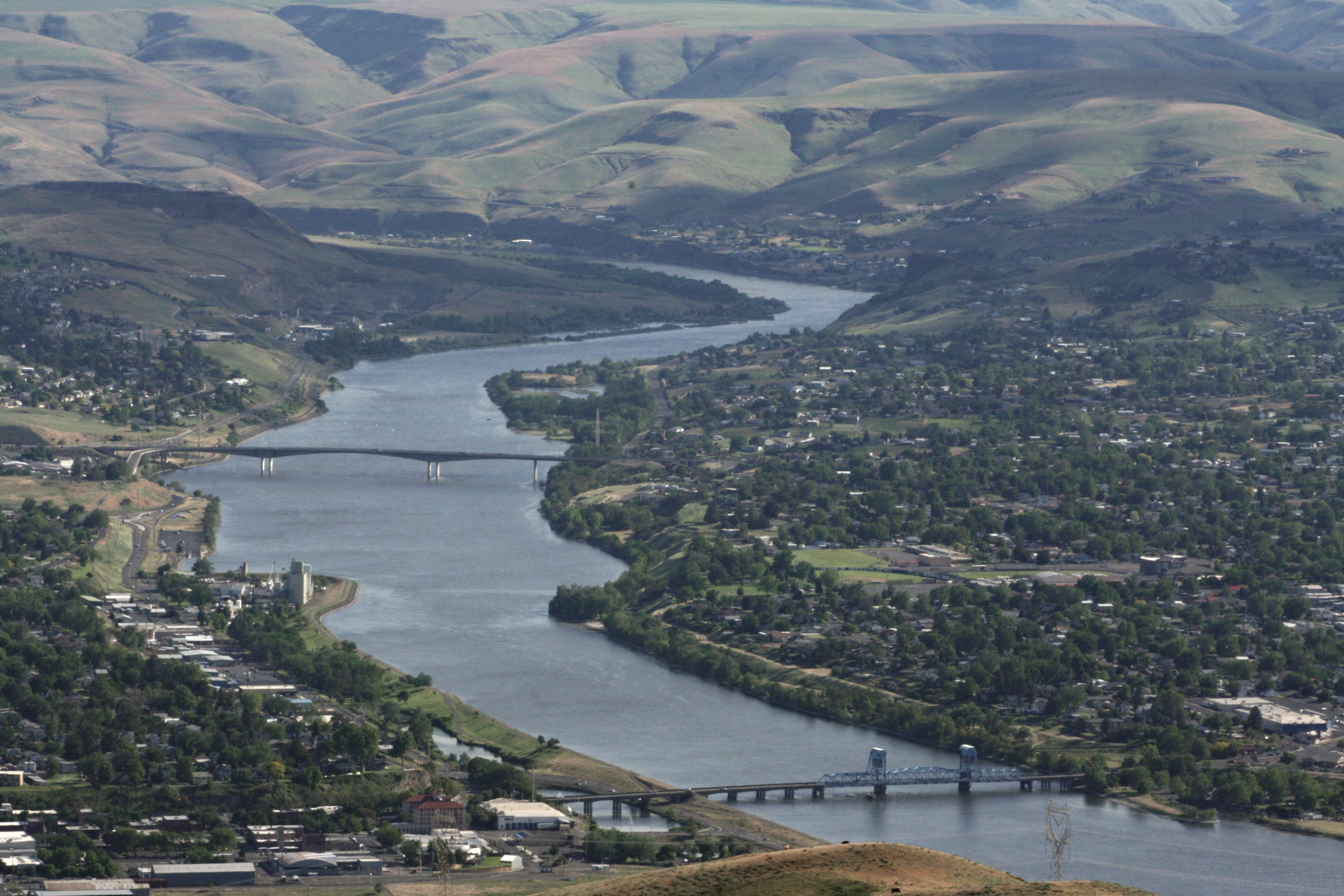
- A view of Lower Granite Lake/Snake River from Lewiston Hill. The city of Lewiston, Idaho is on the left with Clarkston, Washington on the right. The Interstate Highway Bridge is in the foreground and the Southway Bridge in the center of the photograph.

- Location within the United States
- Coordinates: 46.426468°N 117.124779°W

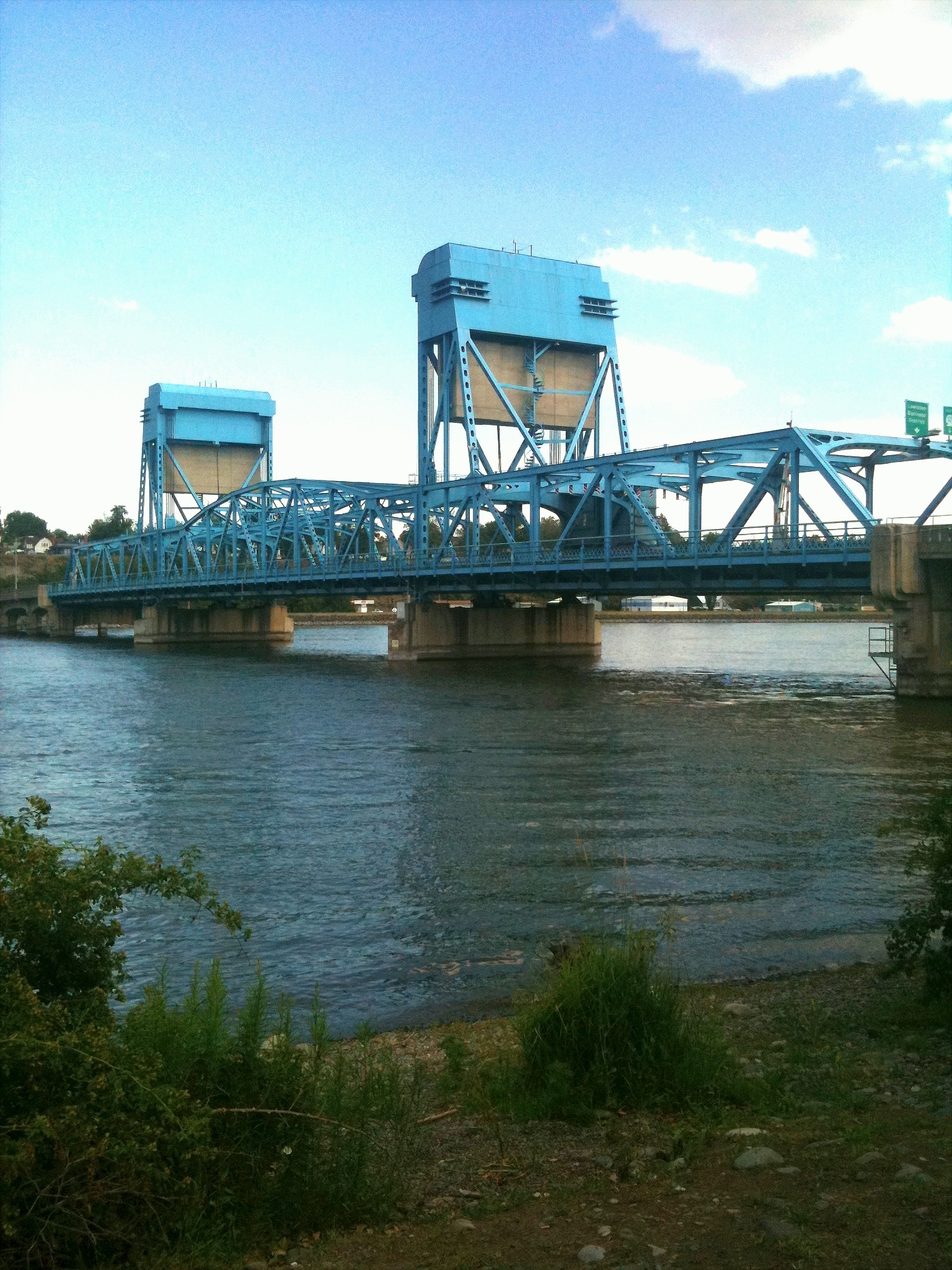
The Lower Granite Lake was created in 1975. Since the Interstate Highway Bridge between Lewiston, Idaho and Clarkston, Washington was high enough, the new lake did not overwhelm the bridge.

Lower Granite Lake is a reservoir created by Lower Granite Dam. The dam is a concrete gravity run-of-the-river dam in the northwest United States. On the lower Snake River in southeastern Washington, it bridges Whitman and Garfield counties. Opened 51 years ago in 1975, the dam is located 22 miles (35 km) south of Colfax and 35 miles (56 km) north of Pomeroy.

Lower Granite Dam is part of the Columbia River Basin system of dams, built and operated by the United States Army Corps of Engineers; power generated is distributed by the Bonneville Power Administration.

Behind the dam, Lower Granite Lake extends 39 miles (63 km) east to Lewiston, Idaho and Clarkston, Washington, and allowed the Lewiston–Clarkston metropolitan area to become a port. The first barge to Portland on the 374-mile (602 km) navigation route was loaded with wheat and departed Lewiston on August 9, 1975.'

== Bridges ==
- Southway Bridge - crosses between Lewiston, Idaho and Clarkston, Washington
- Interstate Highway Bridge - also crosses between Lewiston and Clarkston, carrying U.S. Route 12 between the cities
- Red Wolf Crossing - crosses between Clarkston and Whitman County, Washington, carrying Washington SR 128

== Photos ==
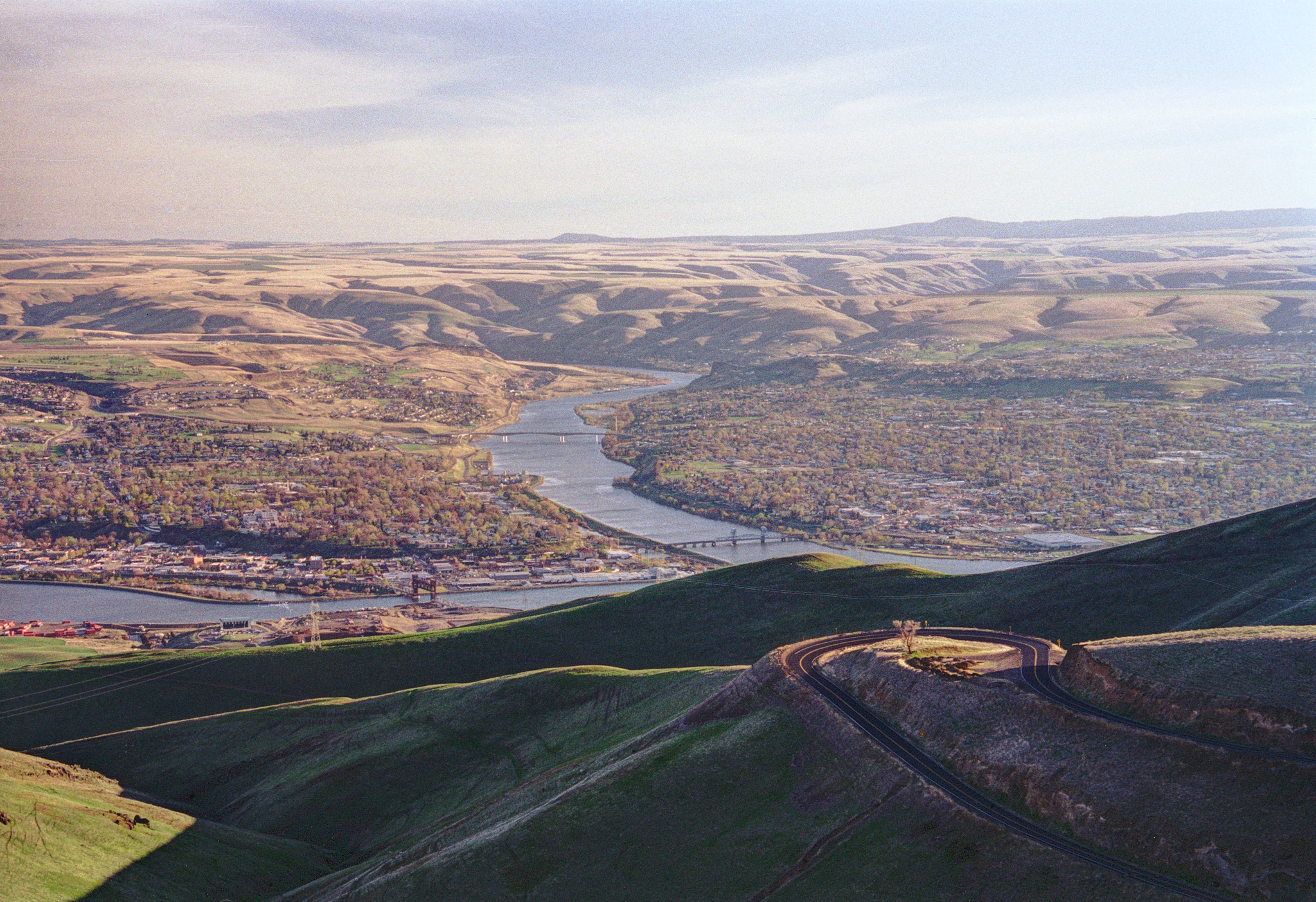
Another photo of the lake from Lewiston Hill, which shows the Clearwater River to the left (in Idaho) and the Snake River in the center. Washington state is to the right.

- commons:Category:Confluence of the Snake River and the Clearwater River
