= Ricardo Cobo (politician) =

Colombian politician

Ricardo Hernando Cobo Lloreda is a Colombian businessman and politician who served as mayor of Cali from 1998 to 2000.
