= Lewiston Hill =

Escarpment in Idaho, United States

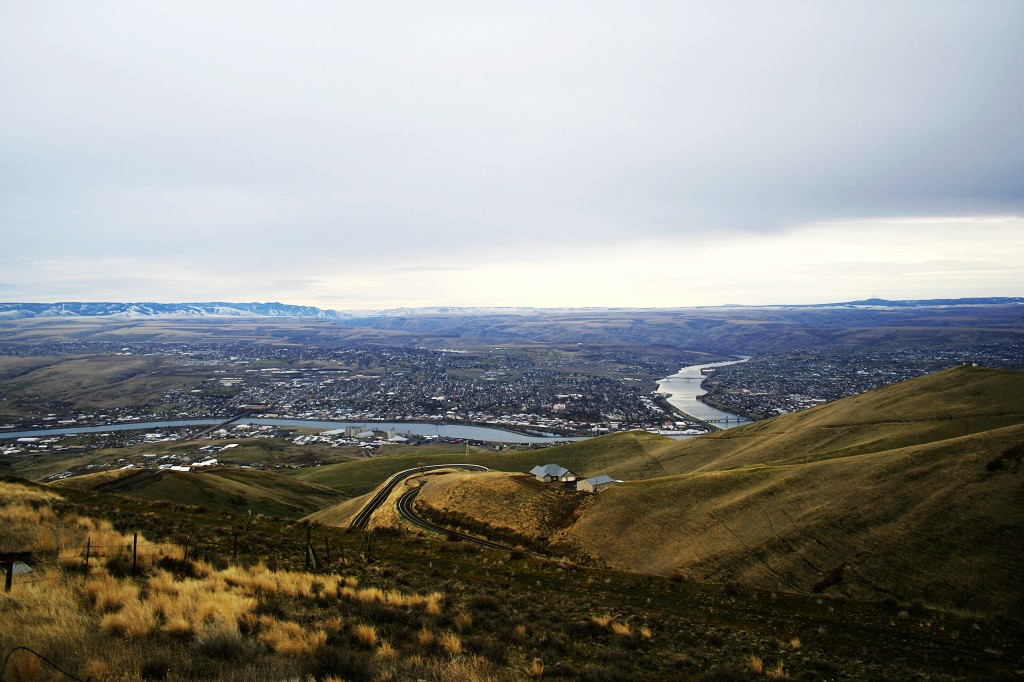
- Looking south from the top in 2006

- Location within the United States Location within Idaho
- Elevation: 2,756 feet (840 m)
- Length: 5.3 miles (8.5 km)
- Traversed by: US 95
- Max gradient: 7 %

Third Approach
- Location: Nez Perce County, Idaho, U.S.
- Coordinates: 46.4602°N 117.0162°W

Lewiston Hill (also known as the "Clearwater Escarpment") is a large sloping escarpment in the northwest United States, located immediately north of the confluence of the Clearwater and Snake rivers in north central Idaho.

Residents of the nearby cities of Lewiston, Idaho, and Clarkston, Washington, typically refer to "Lewiston Hill" as the mostly unfarmed land north of the city limits of the respective cities, but still remaining visible from the cities. At the top of the escarpment is a notable agricultural region known as the Palouse.

The border between Lewiston Hill and the Palouse is at an approximate elevation of 2,756 feet (840 m) above sea level, as measured at a rest area at the junction of U.S. Routes 95 and 195. At the foot of the hill is the eastern end of Lower Granite Lake, at the confluence of the Clearwater and Snake rivers; its typical surface elevation is 741 feet (226 m), yielding a vertical drop of 2,015 feet (614 m) to the water.

Just below the summit of the escarpment and north of both city centers, there are corresponding initials for Lewiston (L) and Clarkston (C), painted white.

== Highways ==
- – U.S. Route 95
- – U.S. Route 195
- – SH 128

=== Old Spiral Highway ===
Branching off of State Highway 128 (just east of the Washington-Idaho transition from Washington State Route 128), the "Old Spiral Highway" and former ten-mile (16 km) segment of U.S. Route 95 climbs two thousand feet (610 m) above the riverbank north of the confluence of the Snake and Clearwater rivers. The summit is at 2,756 ft (840 m), following a very twisty road (64 curves) that was opened in 1917. It was the primary route north for sixty years, and received an award as one of the best-engineered stretches of mountain highway at the time. Studies for a replacement route were begun in the mid-1960s; it was decommissioned in 1977, when the current alignment of U.S. Route 95 was opened.

The 1950s rock and roll hit by singer-songwriter Charlie Ryan titled "Hot Rod Lincoln" tells of an actual race on that hill. The lyrics of the song were changed variously to say San Pedro or The Grapevine in later versions, but the Ryan claimed at later performances that he was inspired by Lewiston Hill.

In 1990, the fifth stage of the Ore-Ida Women's Challenge cycling race went through Lewiston and ended with a climb up the Old Spiral Highway.

The north end of the Old Spiral Highway joins with U.S. Routes 95 and 195 on the Washington-Idaho border.

=== U.S. Route 95 up Lewiston Hill ===
The newer multi-lane grade of U.S. Route 95 ascending the slope to the north of Lewiston is often simply referred to as "Lewiston Hill" by local residents. Constructed from 1975 to 1977, it yields a straighter and steeper sweeping "Z" descent to the east, then back to the southwest, and is approximately seven miles (11 km) in length.

== Gallery ==
Old Spiral Highway (left) and current US 95 (right)
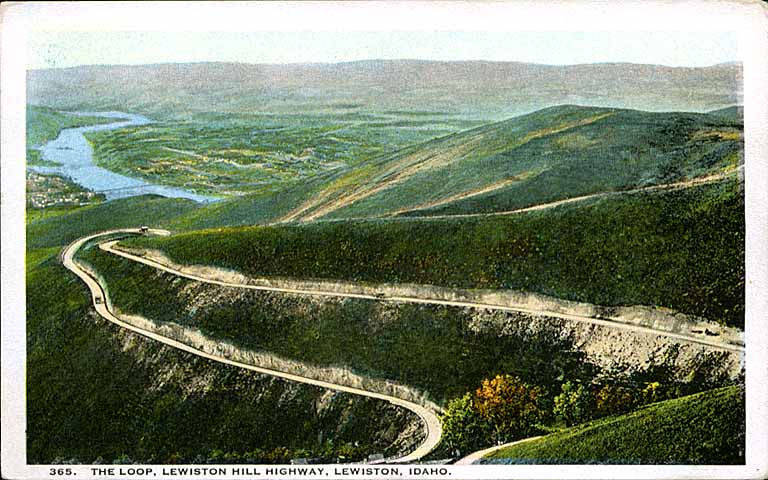
Lewiston Hill Highway, circa 1920

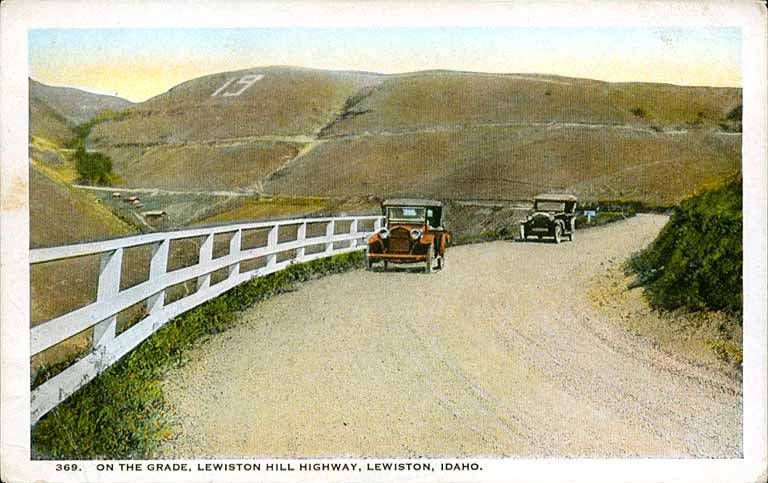
Old Spiral Highway, near Lewiston, Idaho, circa 1920

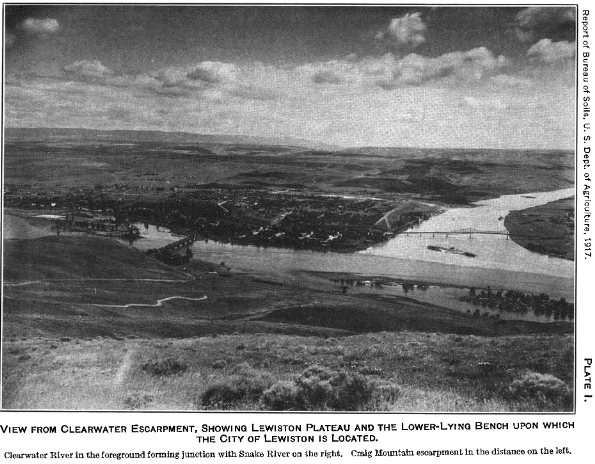
View from Clearwater Escarpment, showing Lewiston Plateau and the lower-lying bench upon which the City of Lewiston is located, 1917

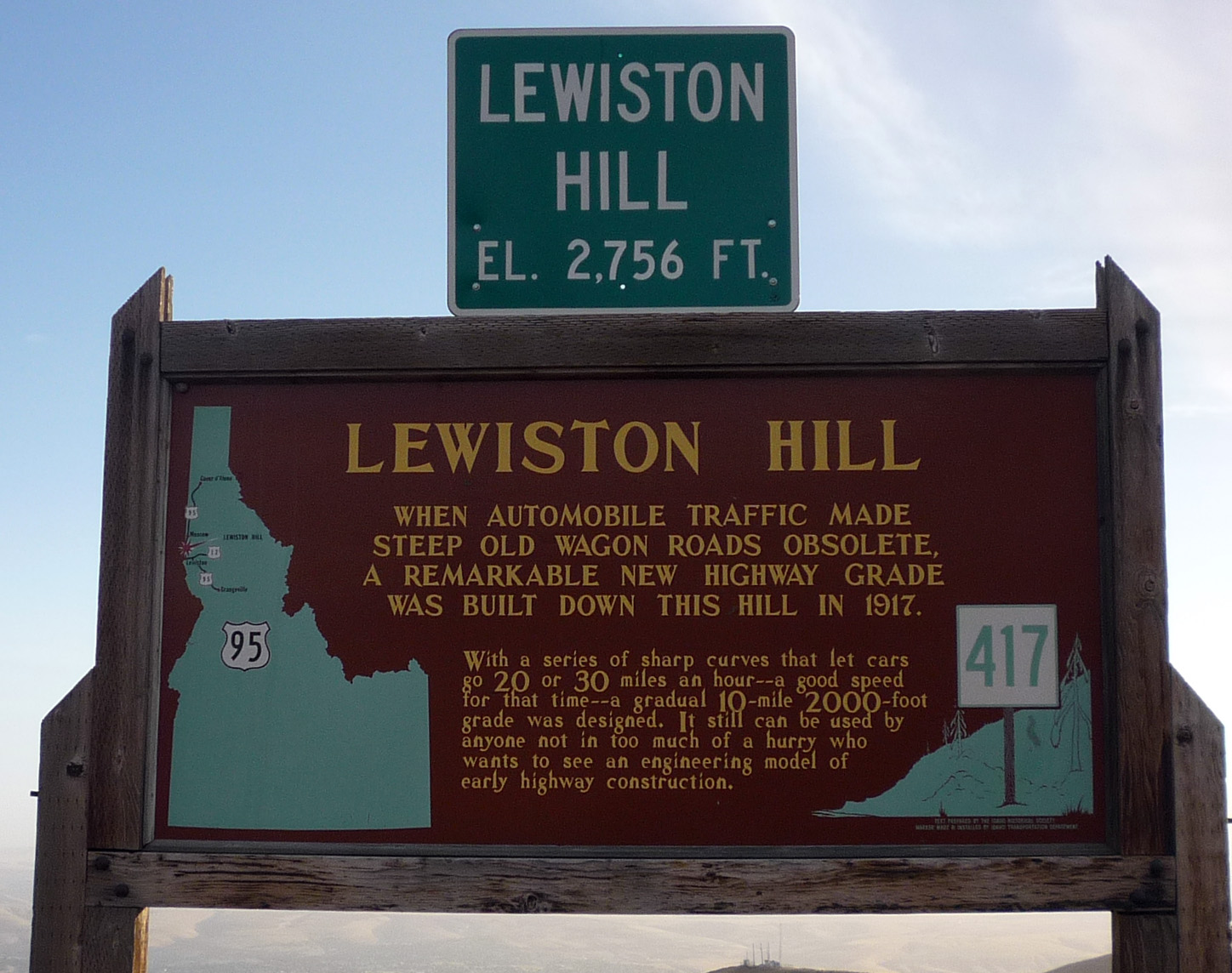
Sign at top of Lewiston Hill
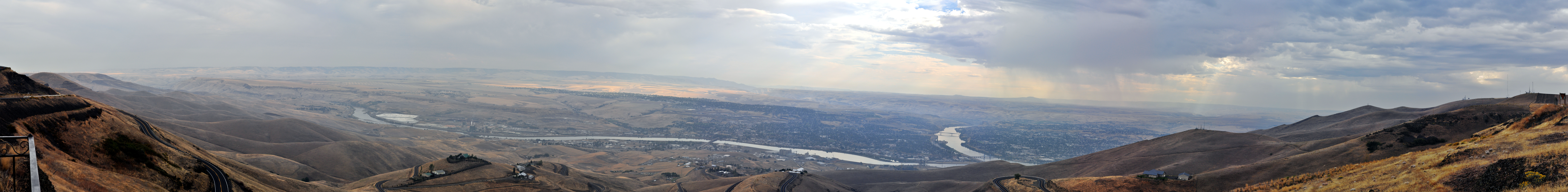
Lewiston Hill from top of hill
