= Fields Spring State Park =

State park in Washington State, United States

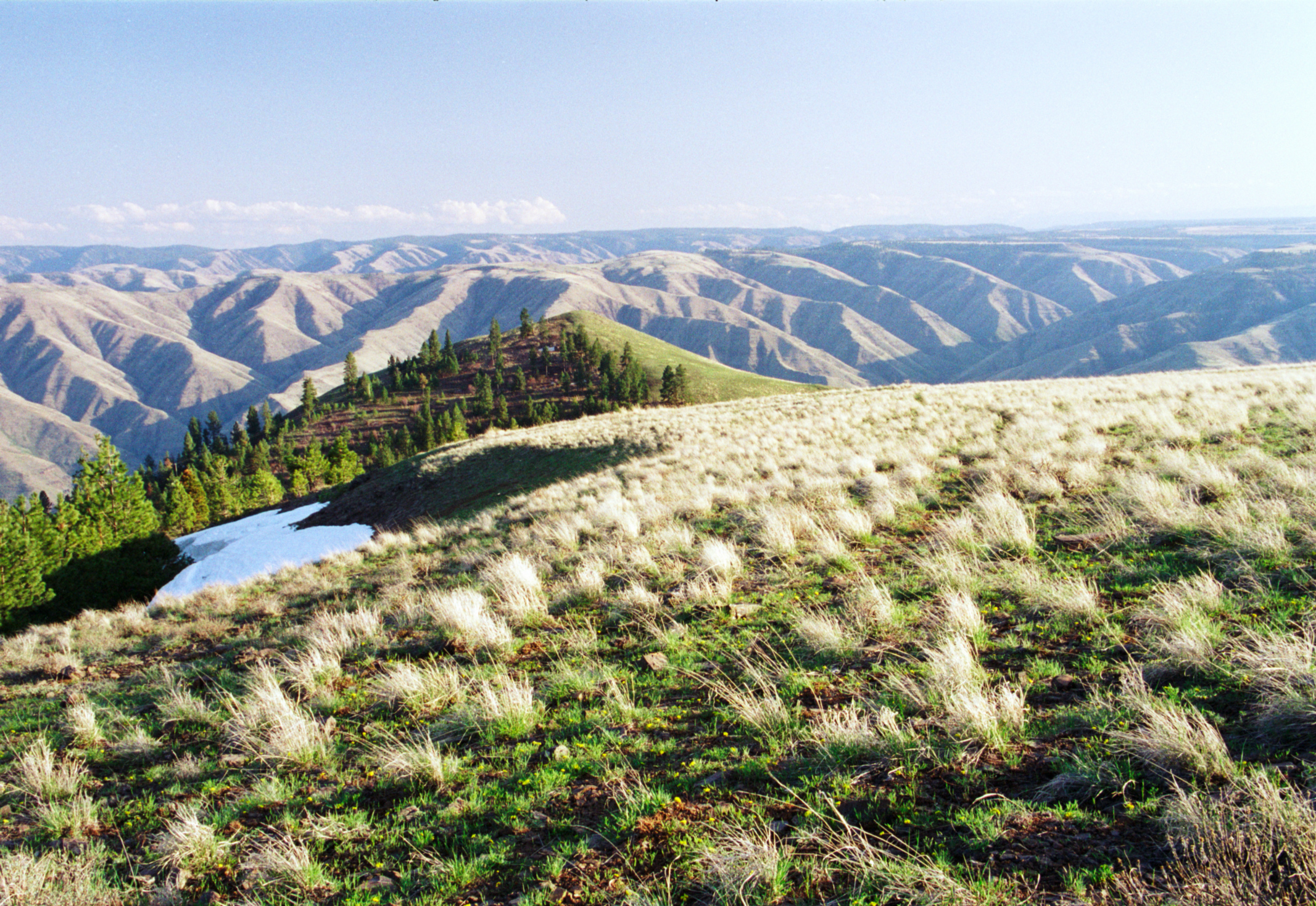
- View from Puffer Butte

- Location within Washington (state) Location within the United States
- Location: Asotin County, Washington, United States
- Coordinates: 46°04′52″N 117°10′11″W
- Area: 826 acres (334 ha)
- Elevation: 3,960 ft (1,210 m)
- Established: 1930
- Administrator: Washington State Parks and Recreation Commission
- Website: Official website

Fields Spring State Park is a 828-acre (3.35 km^{2}) public recreation area in the northwest United States, located in southeastern Washington on State Route 129, four miles (6 km), south of Anatone.

Near the tripoint with Idaho and Oregon, the state park offers various routes to the top of Puffer Butte and its scenic views of the Wallowa Mountains and the Grande Ronde River and Snake River basins. The park was initially developed by members of the local chapter of the Isaac Walton League and workers with the Works Progress Administration.

== Activities and amenities ==
The park features camping, trails for hiking, biking, and cross-country skiing, athletic fields, and picnicking facilities as well as the Puffer Butte and Wohelo retreat centers.

In the late 1950s and early 1960s, a rope tow for alpine skiing was operated at the park by a private ski club.
