= Flora, Oregon =

Unincorporated community in Oregon, US

- Unincorporated community
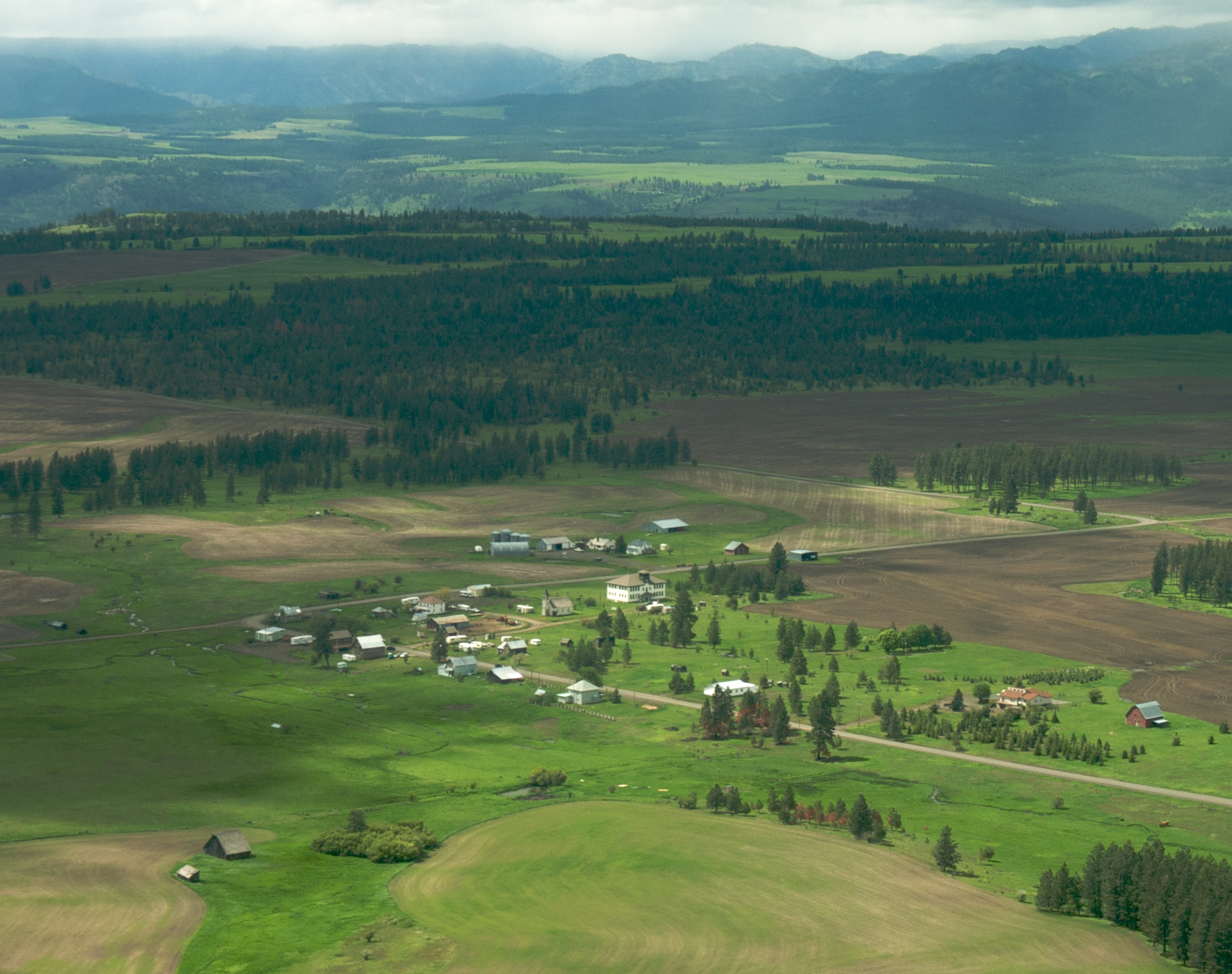
- Flora, Oregon, in 2008

- Location within Oregon
- Coordinates: 45°54′01″N 117°18′36″W
- Country: United States
- State: Oregon
- County: Wallowa
- Elevation: 4,350 ft (1,330 m)

Flora is an unincorporated community in Wallowa County, Oregon, United States. It is located about 35 miles north of Enterprise, just off Oregon Route 3, and is considered a ghost town. Its elevation is 4350 ft. The community includes 6 mines.

== History ==
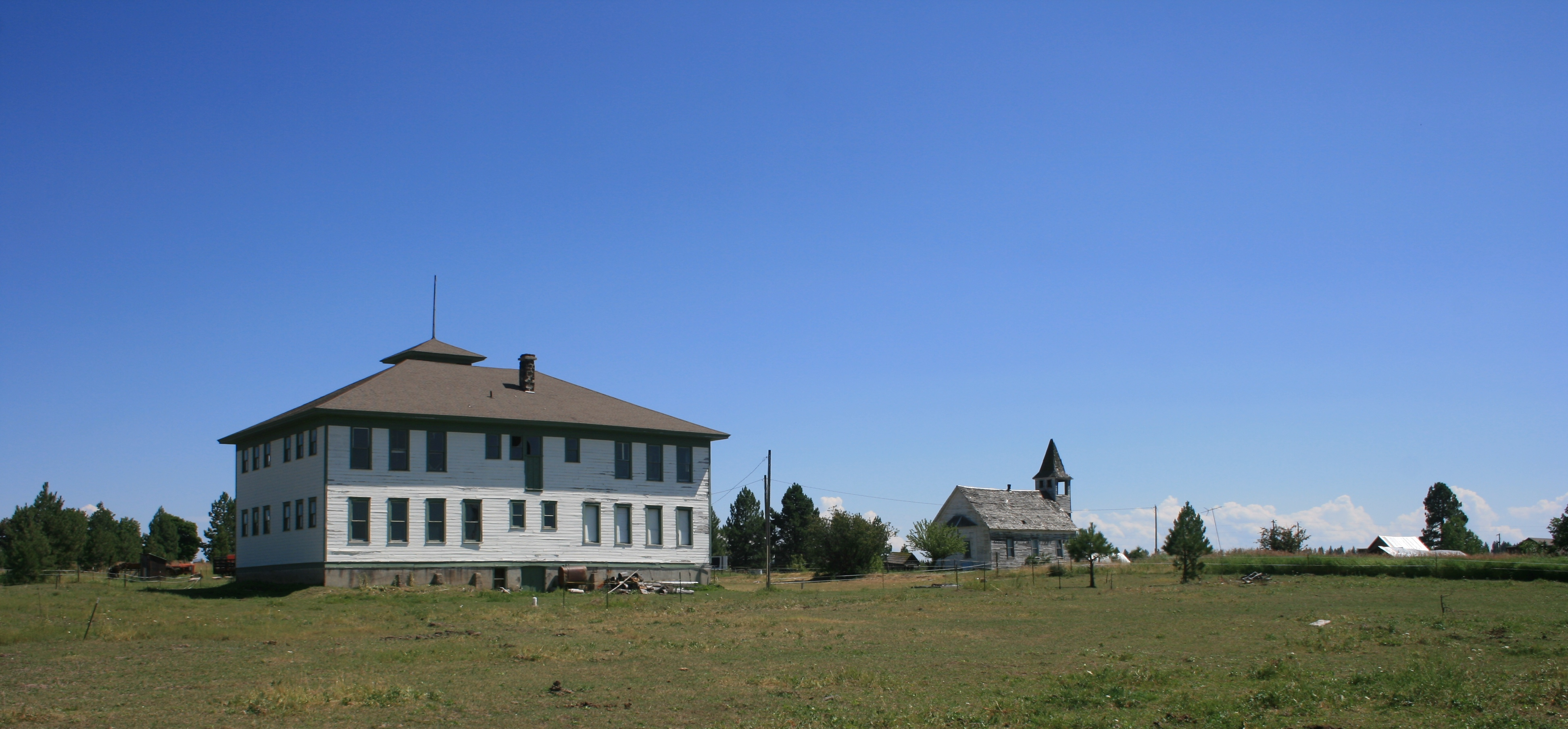
Flora School Education Center

Flora was platted on April 7, 1897. By 1910, it had a population of 200 residents and an eight-room school. It is considered "the most substantial town to fail" in the Northeast Oregon region.

The community was named after the daughter of the first postmaster, A. D. Buzzard. Flora post office operated from 1890–1966. The Flora School, built in 1915, is on the National Register of Historic Places. Now known as the Flora School Education Center, the schoolhouse has been restored as a pioneer arts education center.

== See also ==
- List of ghost towns in Oregon
- Lists of ghost towns in the United States
