= Ricardo Cobo (musician) =

- Born: 1961 (age 64–65); Colombia
- Education: Florida State University, North Carolina School of the Arts, Peabody Conservatory
- Occupations: Professor and Guitar player

Ricardo Cobo (born 1961 in Cali, Colombia to Lebanese parents) is a classical guitarist, considered one of the leading guitarists of his generation. He gave his professional debut with the Orquesta Filarmónica de Bogotá at age seventeen. Cobo was the first Latin American to win the Guitar Foundation of America's International Concert Artist Competition (in 1987) according to the foundation's website, and to date, only one other Latin American-born guitarist has won the prestigious award.

Cobo's touring schedule has taken him from New York's Carnegie Hall and Alice Tully Hall to Korea's Ho Ham Hall, Los Angeles' Ambassador Auditorium, Madrid's Teatro Real, and Zaragoza's Palacio Real, to Venezuela's Teresa Carreño, and his native Colombia's National Library. At his Phillips Gallery solo debut, The Washington Post called his playing "mesmerizing...fiery...sultry...Cobo crafted note-perfect essences of beauty." In 2006, after his performance at the Alexandria Guitar Festival, the Post called him "one of the finest guitarists of our time [...] Cobo has the smoldering sensuality of Latin music deep in his blood."

Cobo can be heard on his solo recordings of classical and children's music, his orchestral and crossover recordings, and in various commercial releases. They include 2000's critically acclaimed Guitar Lullaby, out on Ellipsis Arts and Latin American Guitar Music, out on Naxos. Cobo has also recorded Leo Brouwer's 3rd and 4th guitar concertos, and his performance of Brouwer's "Concerto de Toronto" with the San Antonio Symphony was called "extrovert, lyrical and rhythmically alive...Cobo's performance was characterized by generosity of spirit, to say nothing of knockout virtuosity."

Cobo's virtuosity is widely recognized, and in 2012, Alhambra Guitars partnered with him to create a signature "Ricardo Cobo" guitar. Cobo can be seen performing on his Alhambra on the guitar-maker's website.

Cobo has been decorated by his country, receiving Colombia's "Order of Cañasgordas" and the "Order of Belalcazar" for outstanding merit in cultural affairs.

Cobo began his guitar studies in his hometown of Cali, Colombia and first traveled abroad to study at Aspen Music Festival. He later enrolled at Peabody Conservatory in Baltimore to study with famous guitar teacher Aaron Shearer. When Shearer transferred to North Carolina School of the Arts, Cobo went him and obtained his bachelor's degree in guitar performance. He would later study with Bruce Holzman in Florida State University.

== Discography ==
- Tales For Guitar, 1994, Essay Recordings
- Leo Brouwer, Concertos 3 & 4, Essay Recordings, 1995
- Brouwer, Guitar Music, Vol. 1, Naxos, 1998
- Walking on Water, 1999
- Guitar Lullaby, 2000, Ellipsis
- Latin American Guitar Music, 2003, Naxos
- Greatest Hits For String Quartet, Ricardo Cobo and members of Philharmonia Virtuosi, 1994, Essay Recordings

== Education ==
- Cobo attended Peabody Conservatory in Baltimore and later North Carolina School of the Arts where he obtained his bachelor's in guitar performance. He has a PhD from Florida State University.
