= Anatone, Washington =

Unincorporated community in Washington, United States

- Census-designated place
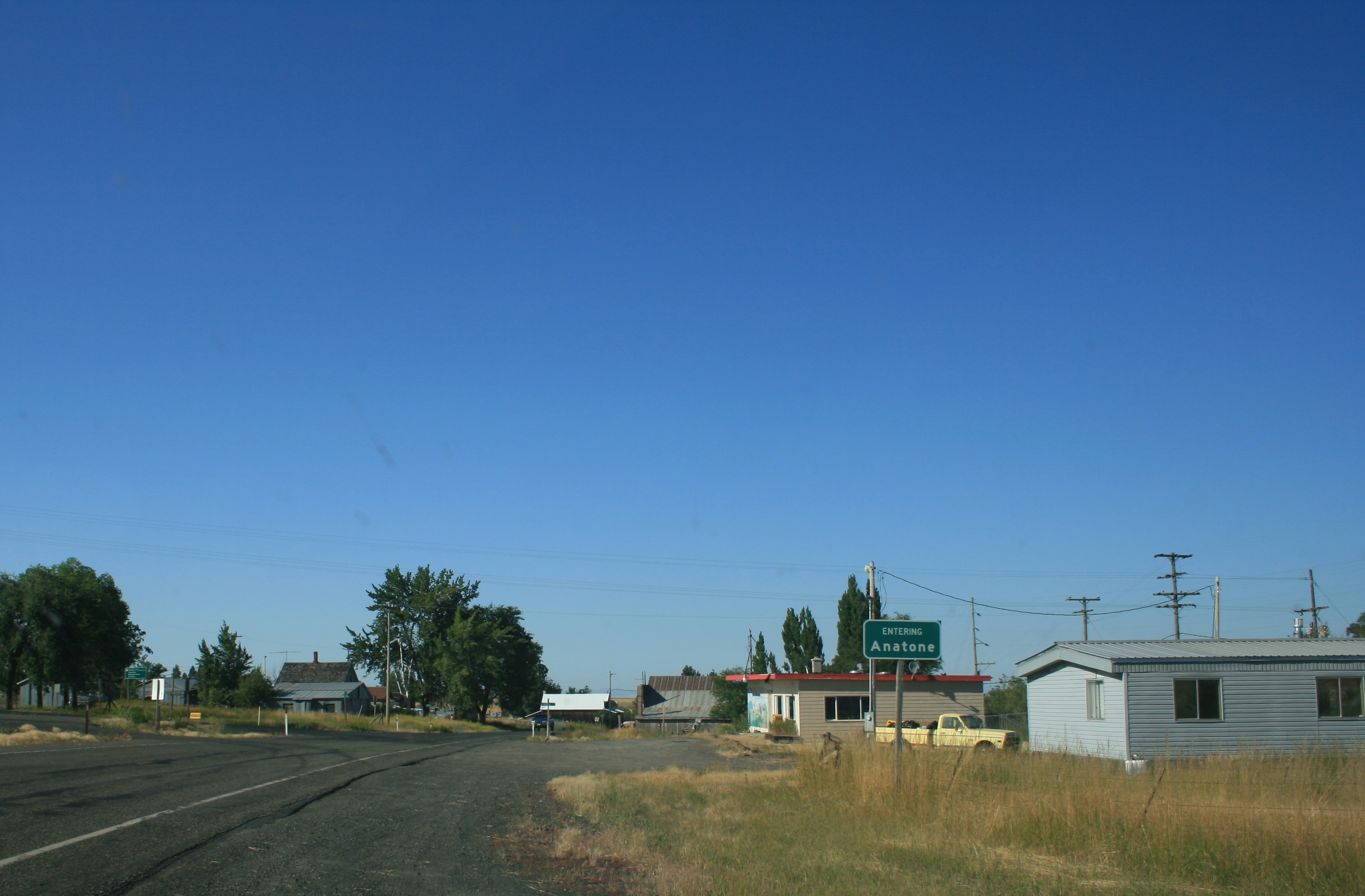
- South entrance in 2011

- Location within Washington (state)
- Coordinates: 46°08′08″N 117°07′57″W
- Country: United States
- State: Washington
- County: Asotin
- Elevation: 3,560 ft (1,090 m)

Population (2010)
  - Total: 38 (estimated)
- Time zone: UTC-8 (Pacific (PST))
  - Summer (DST): UTC-7 (PDT)
- ZIP Code: 99401
- Area code: 509
- GNIS feature ID: 2807173

Anatone (/ˈænətoʊn/) is a census-designated place in Asotin County, Washington. As of the 2020 census, Anatone had a population of 25.

== History ==
Anatone was first settled in 1878 by Daniel McIvor and Charles Isecke. It was named for a Nez Perce woman. It is a working class agricultural area near the tripoint with Idaho and Oregon, primarily growing wheat. The only commercial service available in the area (as of January 2025) is Millie's Grille, located on State Highway 129 (building formerly Anatone Trading Post & Cafe).

== Geography ==
Anatone is part of the Lewiston, ID-WA Metropolitan Statistical Area, and is approximately 24 miles (40 km) south of Clarkston on State Route 129.

== Demographics ==
Historical population
Census	Pop.	Note	%±
2020	25		—
U.S. Decennial Census

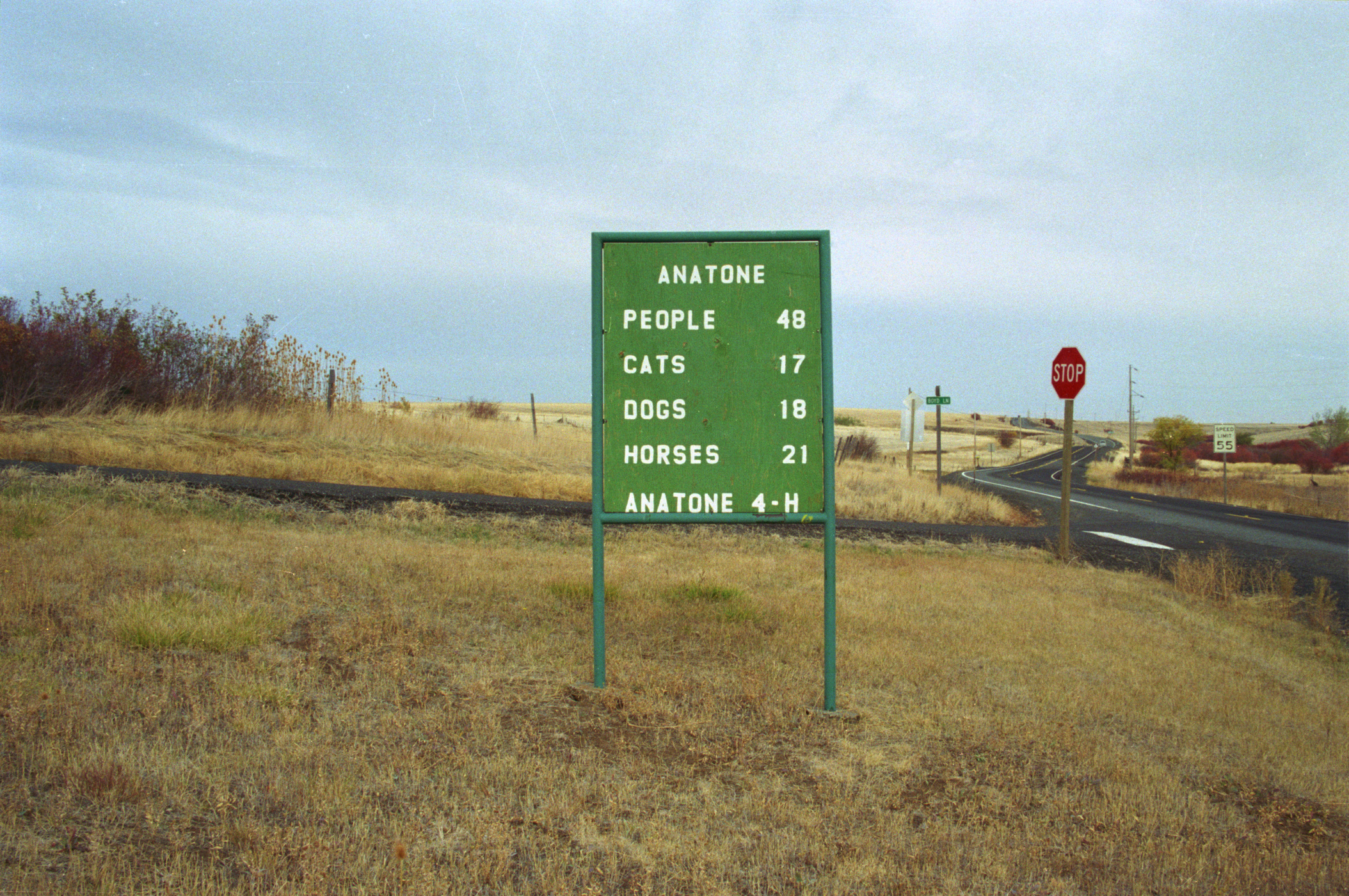
Anatone, WA (2001)

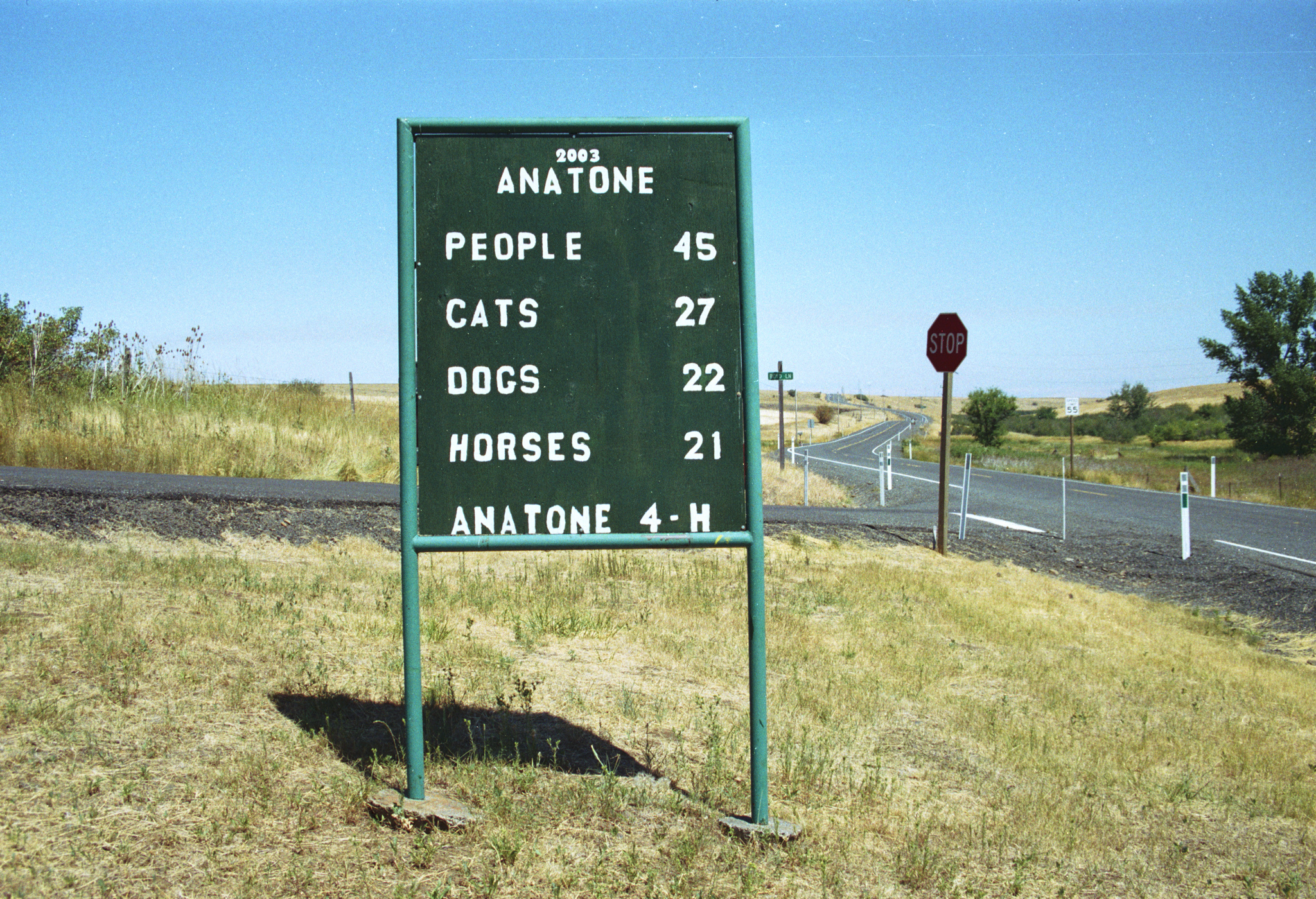
Anatone, WA (2003)

Anatone first appeared as a census designated place in the 2020 U.S. census.

=== Racial and ethnic composition ===
Anatone CDP, Washington – Racial and ethnic composition Note: the US Census treats Hispanic/Latino as an ethnic category. This table excludes Latinos from the racial categories and assigns them to a separate category. Hispanics/Latinos may be of any race.
Race / Ethnicity (NH = Non-Hispanic)	Pop 2020	2020
White alone (NH)	23	92.00%
Black or African American alone (NH)	0	0.00%
Native American or Alaska Native alone (NH)	0	0.00%
Asian alone (NH)	0	0.00%
Native Hawaiian or Pacific Islander alone (NH)	1	4.00%
Other race alone (NH)	0	0.00%
Mixed race or Multiracial (NH)	0	0.00%
Hispanic or Latino (any race)	1	4.00%
Total	25	100.00%

=== 2000 census ===
In 2000, an estimated 221 people lived in areas served by the Anatone Post Office, in 167 housing units. As of January 1, 2010, there was a count of 38 people in the town of Anatone.

== Climate ==
According to the Köppen Climate Classification system, Anatone has a Humid continental climate, abbreviated "Dsb" on climate maps.

Climate data for Anatone
Month	Jan	Feb	Mar	Apr	May	Jun	Jul	Aug	Sep	Oct	Nov	Dec	Year
Record high °F (°C)	58 (14)	63 (17)	71 (22)	87 (31)	90 (32)	97 (36)	104 (40)	104 (40)	100 (38)	85 (29)	72 (22)	58 (14)	104 (40)
Mean daily maximum °F (°C)	33 (1)	38.5 (3.6)	45 (7)	53.7 (12.1)	62.3 (16.8)	70 (21)	80.4 (26.9)	79.6 (26.4)	70.2 (21.2)	58.6 (14.8)	44.3 (6.8)	35.2 (1.8)	55.9 (13.3)
Mean daily minimum °F (°C)	18.6 (−7.4)	23 (−5)	26.8 (−2.9)	32 (0)	38 (3)	44.1 (6.7)	48.5 (9.2)	47.8 (8.8)	41.4 (5.2)	35 (2)	27.9 (−2.3)	22 (−6)	33.8 (1.0)
Record low °F (°C)	−26 (−32)	−24 (−31)	−10 (−23)	2 (−17)	20 (−7)	26 (−3)	30 (−1)	29 (−2)	12 (−11)	0 (−18)	−18 (−28)	−32 (−36)	−32 (−36)
Average precipitation inches (mm)	2.64 (67)	1.82 (46)	1.98 (50)	1.77 (45)	2.09 (53)	2.1 (53)	0.7 (18)	0.83 (21)	1.14 (29)	1.71 (43)	2.36 (60)	2.39 (61)	21.54 (547)
Average snowfall inches (cm)	22.2 (56)	14.7 (37)	11.1 (28)	2.6 (6.6)	0.8 (2.0)	0 (0)	0 (0)	0 (0)	0 (0)	1 (2.5)	8.7 (22)	17.5 (44)	78.5 (199)
Average precipitation days (≥ 0.01 inch)	12	9	10	9	9	8	4	4	5	7	10	11	98

== Parks and recreation ==
Fields Spring State Park is four miles (6 km) south of Anatone on State Route 129.

== Notable people ==
- Aaron Shearer, classical guitarist
