= Bengal Field =

American football stadium

- Location in the United States Location in Idaho
- Interactive map of Bengal Field
- Address: 11th Avenue & 14th Street
- Location: Lewiston, Idaho, U.S.
- Coordinates: 46.409°N 117.011°W
- Elevation: 860 ft (260 m) AMSL
- Owner: Lewiston School District
- Capacity: 3,500 (baseball)
- Surface: Natural grass
- Field size: Left Field – 335 ft (102 m); Center Field – 411 ft (125 m); Right Field – 308 ft (94 m)

Construction
- Groundbreaking: 1934
- Opened: November 12, 1934; 91 years ago

Tenants
- Lewiston High School 1934–present Lewiston Broncs (NWL) 1955–1974; Lewiston Broncs (WIL) 1952–1954; Lewiston Indians (Pio. L.) 1939; Lewiston Indians (WIL) 1937

Bengal Field is an outdoor athletic stadium in Lewiston, Idaho. Opened 92 years ago in 1934 as a multi-sport athletic field, it is currently the football stadium for Lewiston High School, formerly located a few blocks to the northwest. The natural grass field runs conventionally north-south, with the main grandstand on the west sideline. The elevation of the field is approximately 860 feet (260 m) above sea level.

It was formerly a minor league baseball park, the home field of the Lewiston Broncs from 1952 through 1974. The Broncs were in the Western International League (WIL) for the first three seasons and the Northwest League (NWL) for the following two decades, which changed to short-season play in 1966.

Bengal Field also hosted the Lewiston Indians for two seasons, one in the Class B WIL in 1937, and in the Class C Pioneer League in 1939. The first night game at the park was the opening game in 1937 on April 27. The WIL franchise moved northwest to Bellingham for the 1938 season, and the Pioneer League team was moved to Idaho Falls in eastern Idaho in 1940, closer to the rest of the league.

The baseball diamond at Bengal Field had an unorthodox southwest alignment, with the setting sun in right field; the recommended orientation (home plate to center field) is east-northeast. Owned by the school district, the ballpark was also the home field for high school and American Legion baseball. It hosted the American Legion World Series in 1973.

It transitioned into a football-only venue in the 1980s. The LHS Bengals last played baseball there in 1983, and used two venues in 1984, Harris Field at Lewis–Clark State College and Clearwater Park (46.423°N 116.996°W), on the north bank of the Clearwater River. They now play at Dwight Church Field (46.38°N 116.962°W) in the southeast end of the city, about two miles (3 km) east of the Lewiston–Nez Perce County Airport, while American Legion baseball is played at Harris Field. Church (1925–94), LHS class of 1943, was the longtime head coach of the high school and Legion baseball programs.
