= Pullman–Moscow Regional Airport =

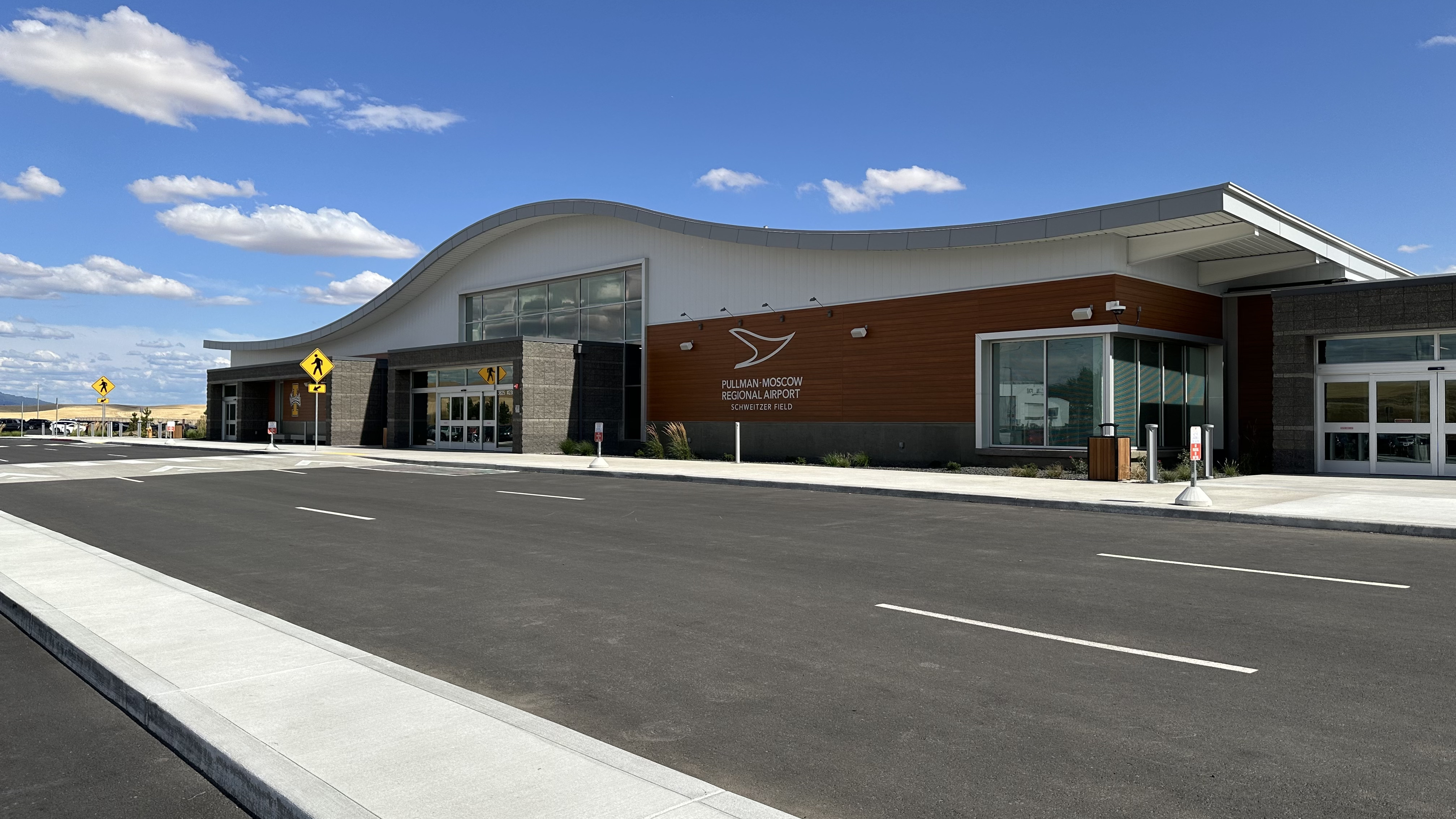
- Terminal exterior in August 2024
- IATA: PUW; ICAO: KPUW; FAA LID: PUW

Summary
- Airport type: Public
- Owner: Pullman–Moscow Regional Airport Board
- Serves: Pullman-Moscow Combined Statistical Area
- Location: Pullman, Washington
- Time zone: Pacific Standard (UTC−8)
  - Summer (DST): Pacific Daylight (UTC−7)
- Elevation AMSL: 2,567 ft (782 m)
- Coordinates: 46.744°N 117.108°W
- Website: flypuw.com

Maps
- FAA airport diagram
- Location in Washington Location in the United States

Runways
Direction	Length		Surface
Direction	ft	m	Surface
5/23	7,101	2,164	Asphalt

Statistics
- Aircraft operations (2014): 29,350
- Based aircraft (2018): 71
- Total passengers (12 months ending Oct 2017): 119,000
- Source: Federal Aviation Administration

Pullman–Moscow Regional Airport (IATA: PUW, ICAO: KPUW, FAA LID: PUW) is a public airport in the northwest United States, located in Pullman, Washington, four miles (6 km) west of Moscow, Idaho. The airport is near State Route 270, and has a single 7,101-foot (2,164 m) runway, headed northeast–southwest (5/23), which entered service in October 2019. The former runway (6/24) was 6,730 feet (2,051 m) and aligned with Moscow Mountain (4,983 feet (1,519 m)) twelve miles (20 km) to the northeast, the highest summit in the area.

The rural airport in the Palouse region is the primary air link for its two land-grant universities, Washington State University in Pullman and the University of Idaho in Moscow. In addition to scheduled service from Alaska Airlines (through its Horizon Air subsidiary), both universities use the airport for jet charters for their intercollegiate athletic teams.

Seattle air traffic control, 250 miles (400 km) west, manages commercial traffic for the airport. The nearest major airport is Spokane International, approximately ninety miles (145 km) to the north, and Lewiston is about 25 miles (40 km) south.

The Federal Aviation Administration (FAA) National Plan of Integrated Airport Systems for 2017–2021 categorized the airport as a non-hub primary commercial service facility.

== History ==
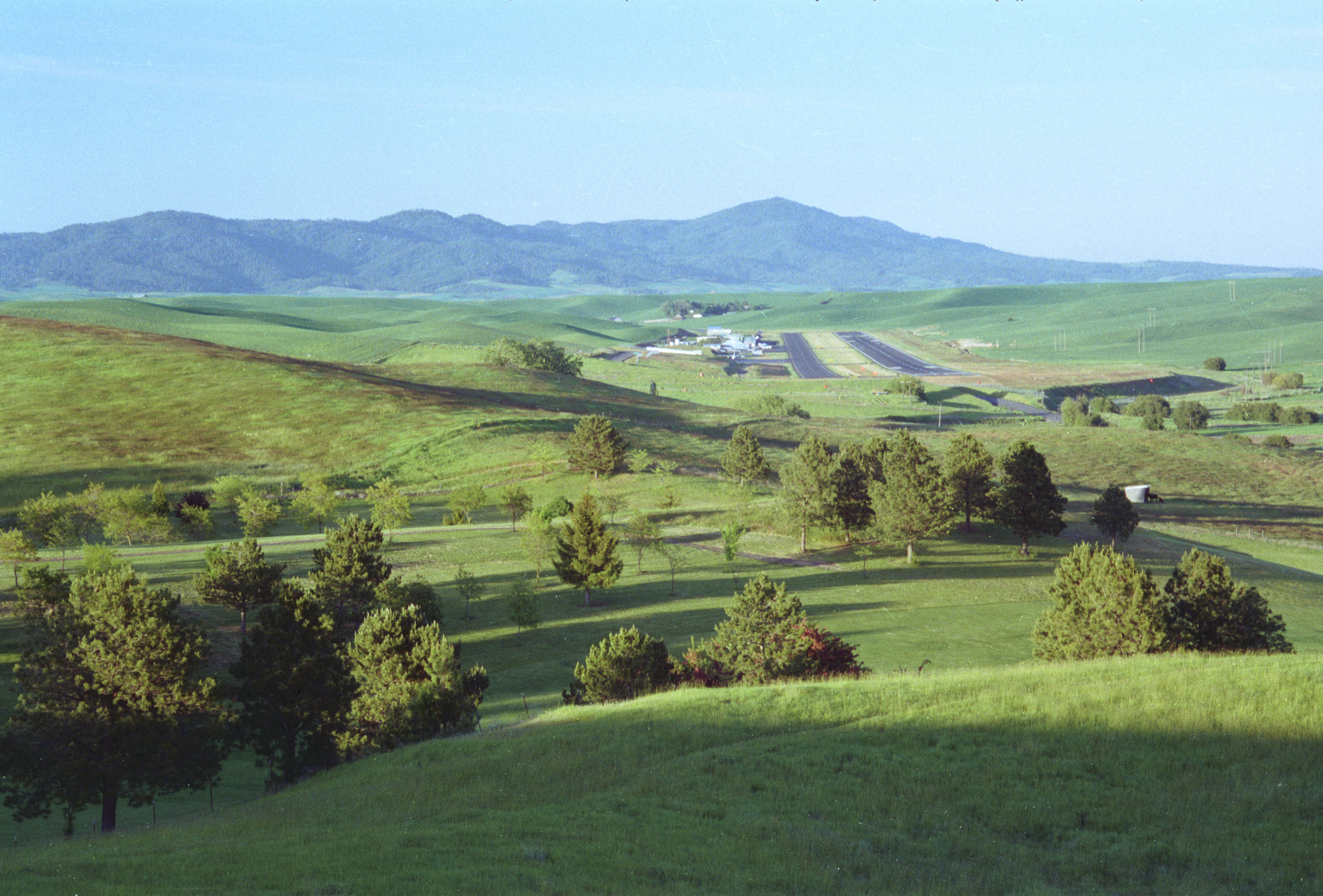
View from southwest in 2000 of taxiway and runway 6, aligned with Moscow Mountain in Idaho

Aviation at the site began in the 1920s as a grass strip, which was later improved by the Civilian Conservation Corps (CCC) and Works Progress Administration (WPA); the runway was first paved in 1946, and lengthened to 6,800 feet (2,070 m) in 1968 with an 1,800-foot (550 m) extension to the west.

Horizon Air (marketed and sold as Alaska Airlines) is the sole commercial airline serving the airport, flying Embraer 175 jet aircraft. Its limited service to Pullman–Moscow began 45 years ago in December 1981 with Fairchild F-27 aircraft (Friday & Sunday), and daily service (along with Lewiston) in March 1983, on F-27 and Metroliner aircraft. Service to Portland, Spokane, and Boise was ended in 1997.

Horizon (later folded into the Alaska brand) now offers four to five daily scheduled flights to Seattle–Tacoma. Historically, flight schedules had sometimes included a stop at Lewiston, but currently all scheduled flights to Seattle are non-stop. Flights to Boise returned August 2021 with service five times a week; it was suspended in May 2024 and is scheduled to return in August due to a lack of demand outside of the school year. Alaska moved to all-jet service to Pullman–Moscow in November 2022, replacing Q400 turboprops with Embraer 175 jets.

Prior to Horizon, Cascade Airways (1969–1986) was the main carrier at the airport, starting Palouse service in late 1971, and had over 16,500 boardings at Pullman–Moscow in 1977. Hughes Airwest supplied service in the early 1970s, Gem State Airlines in the late 1970s, and United Express for over two years, from May 1988 to September 1990.

From the late 1960s to the mid-1970s, a regional airport for the Quad Cities (Lewiston–Clarkston, Moscow–Pullman) was explored, but the city council of Lewiston withdrew its support of the study in October 1974. Lewiston–Nez Perce County Airport is about 25 miles (40 km) south.

== Facilities and aircraft ==
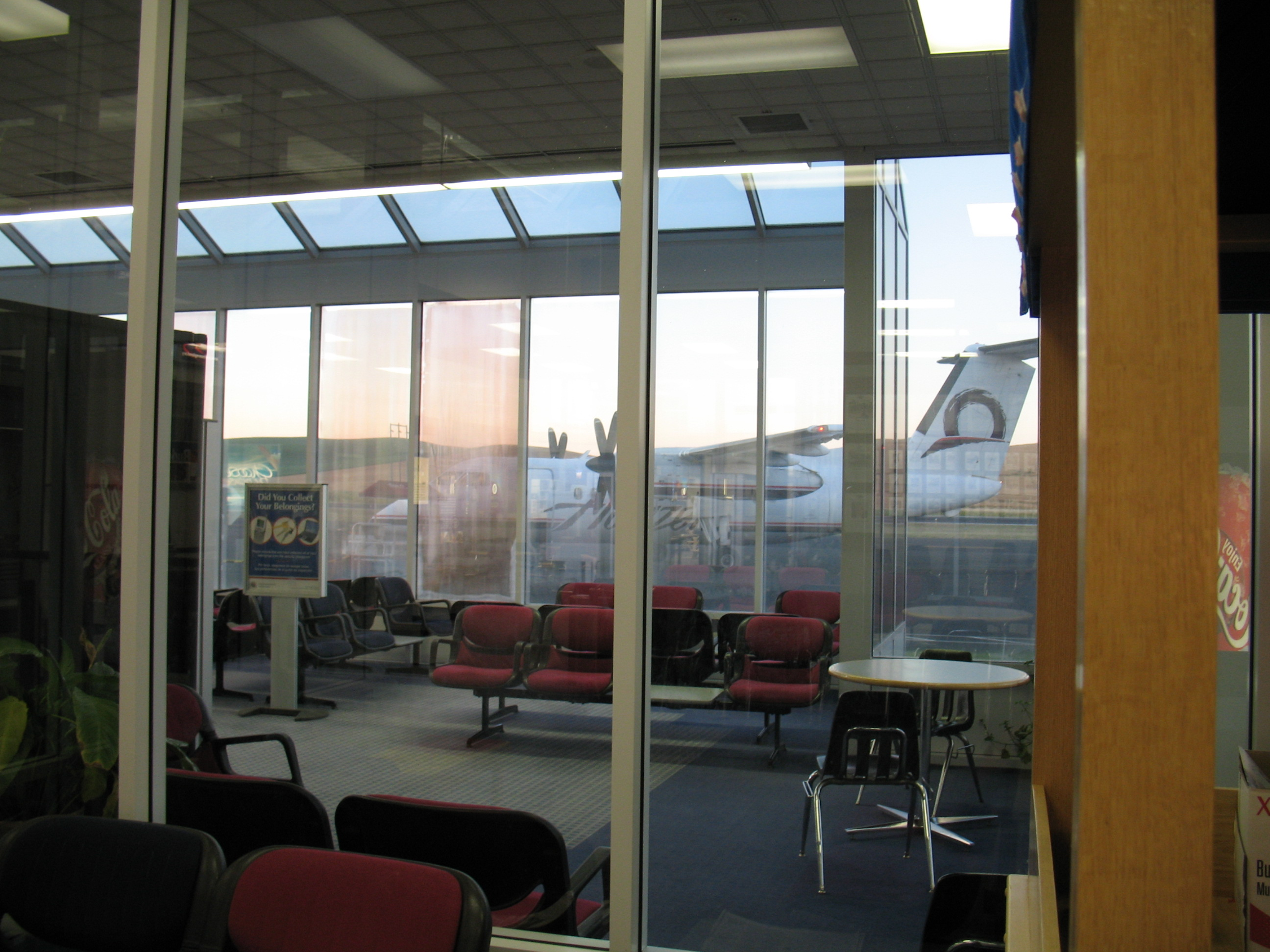
PUW post-security waiting area in 2006

Pullman–Moscow Regional Airport covers an area of 467 acres (1.89 km^{2}) at an elevation of 2,567 feet (782 m) above sea level. It has one asphalt paved runway designated 5/23, which opened in October 2019 and measures 7,101 by 100 feet (2,164 m × 30 m).

The airport was annexed by the City of Pullman in August 1988, and ground was broken in April 1989 to replace the undersized (1,500 square feet (140 m^{2})) and outdated passenger terminal of 1957. Constructed in under ten months, the 8,000-square-foot (740 m^{2}) terminal opened in February 1990 at a cost of $2.7 million, with a formal dedication and airshow in May. It was a single large room, divided between pre- and post-security areas by a single security checkpoint and glass walls. The waiting area occupied all space beyond the checkpoint but was not commonly used for waiting, as most passengers passed through the security checkpoint immediately before boarding. Both passenger gates were ground-level doors to the tarmac; passengers boarded via the fold-down aircraft-door stairs, or airstairs (for larger charter aircraft). Gate 1 on the east side of the terminal was used by Horizon Air.

A vending machine in the terminal area sells canned local Cougar Gold cheese made by the nearby Washington State University.

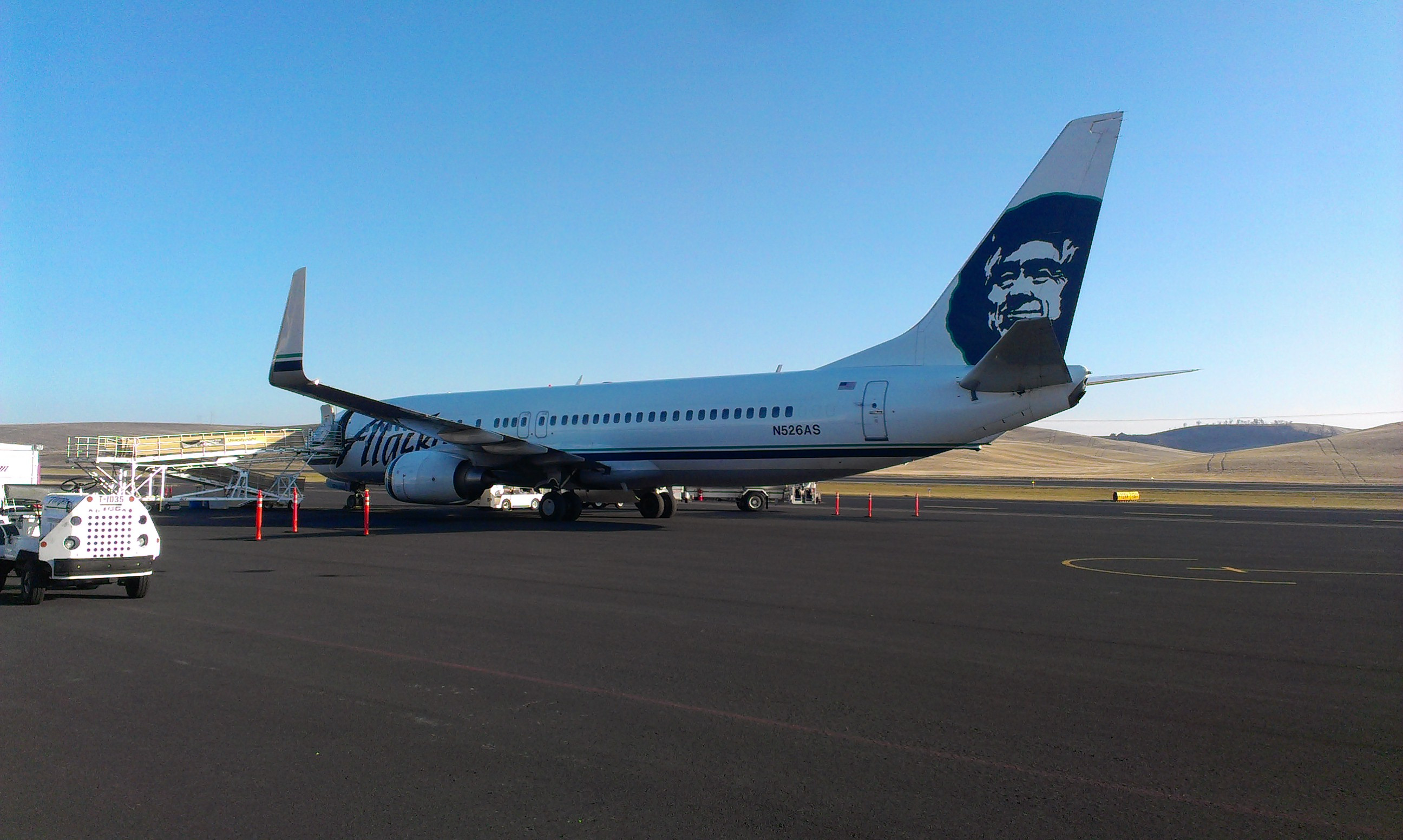
A charter flight at PUW in 2013

To the west, a significantly larger passenger terminal opened on May 22, 2024, at a cost of $92 million to construct. The terminal building is 47,000 square feet (4,400 m^{2}) and includes three jet bridges, a new baggage carousel, new restaurant and outdoor spaces, as well as a separate space for university charters. It was developed alongside runway adjustments that had taken seven years to plan; an expansion with an additional 5,000 square feet (460 m^{2}) opened on August 15, 2024. Construction of the new terminal began in August 2022 and was completed in December 2023. The security area has a larger queueing area, a TSA PreCheck entrance, and additional screening equipment.

The public airport shares the runway with a fixed-base operator, Interstate Aviation, which conducts chartered air service and flight school. Local engineering firm Schweitzer Engineering Laboratories owns and operates private hangars at the airport.

For the 12-month period ending January 1, 2014, the airport had 29,350 aircraft operations, an average of 80 per day: 85% general aviation, 14% scheduled commercial, 1% air taxi, and <1% military. Occasionally, the airport has accepted Boeing 737 aircraft on Alaska Airlines charter flights. In January 2018, there were 71 aircraft based at this airport: 60 single-engine, 7 multi-engine, 3 jet, and 1 glider.

== Airline and destinations ==
Airlines	Destinations	Refs.
Alaska Airlines	Boise, Seattle/Tacoma	

Destinations map
Destinations from Pullman–Moscow Regional Airport
Red = Year-round destination
Blue = Future destination

=== Top destinations ===
Busiest domestic routes out of PUW (July 2025 – June 2026)
Rank	City	Passengers	Carriers
1	Seattle–Tacoma, Washington	61,170	Alaska
2	Boise, Idaho	7,840	Alaska

== Accidents and incidents ==
- On December 28, 1981, a twin-engine Cessna 402 crashed 1.5 miles (2.5 km) north of the airport during a morning snowstorm, killing its pilot, Richard R. Flanagan, the sole occupant. A cargo flight from Spokane to Lewiston, it had diverted to Pullman due to a weather closure at Lewiston.
- On August 8, 2024, a Cessna 182, operating a flight originating from Pullman-Moscow Regional Airport, crashed near Augusta, Montana, killing three.

== See also ==
- List of airports in Washington
