= Lewiston Indians =

- 1939; Lewiston, Idaho

Minor league affiliations
- Previous classes: Class C
- Previous leagues: Pioneer League

Team data
- Previous parks: Bengal Field

The Lewiston Indians were a minor league baseball team in the western United States, based in Lewiston, Idaho. They played in the Pioneer League during the 1939 season, at the Class C level, and were not affiliated with any Major League Baseball (MLB) team. The team's home ballpark was Bengal Field.

== History ==
The Indians were one of the six original teams of the Pioneer League when it was formed in 1939. The team was managed by Herb Sanders, who had pitched in the minor leagues for 12 seasons between 1923 and 1937, and helped to found the Pioneer League. The Indians finished in last place and did not continue past 1939; Lewiston did not have another minor league team until 1952, the Lewiston Broncs.

== Season records ==
Season	Manager(s)	W–L	Win %	Finish	Playoffs	Ref
1939	Herb Sanders	53–71	.427	6th	no playoffs held	

== All-stars ==
Season	Name & Position
1939	Mike Reser, OF

== Notable players ==
Three members of the team appeared in the major leagues; pitcher Lou Garland (1931 Chicago White Sox), outfielder Don White (Philadelphia Athletics in 1948 and 1949), and pitcher Hal Erickson (1953 Detroit Tigers).

== See also ==
- Lewiston Indians players
