= Northwest Children's Home =

Treatment center in Idaho, United States

Northwest Children's Home is a residential treatment center in Lewiston, Idaho for children with emotional disorders, with a facility in Lewiston. It was founded in 1908.

It also provides schooling to its residents and, on a contract basis, to students with emotional disorders sent by their school districts.
