= Lewiston High School (Idaho) =

Public high school in Idaho, US

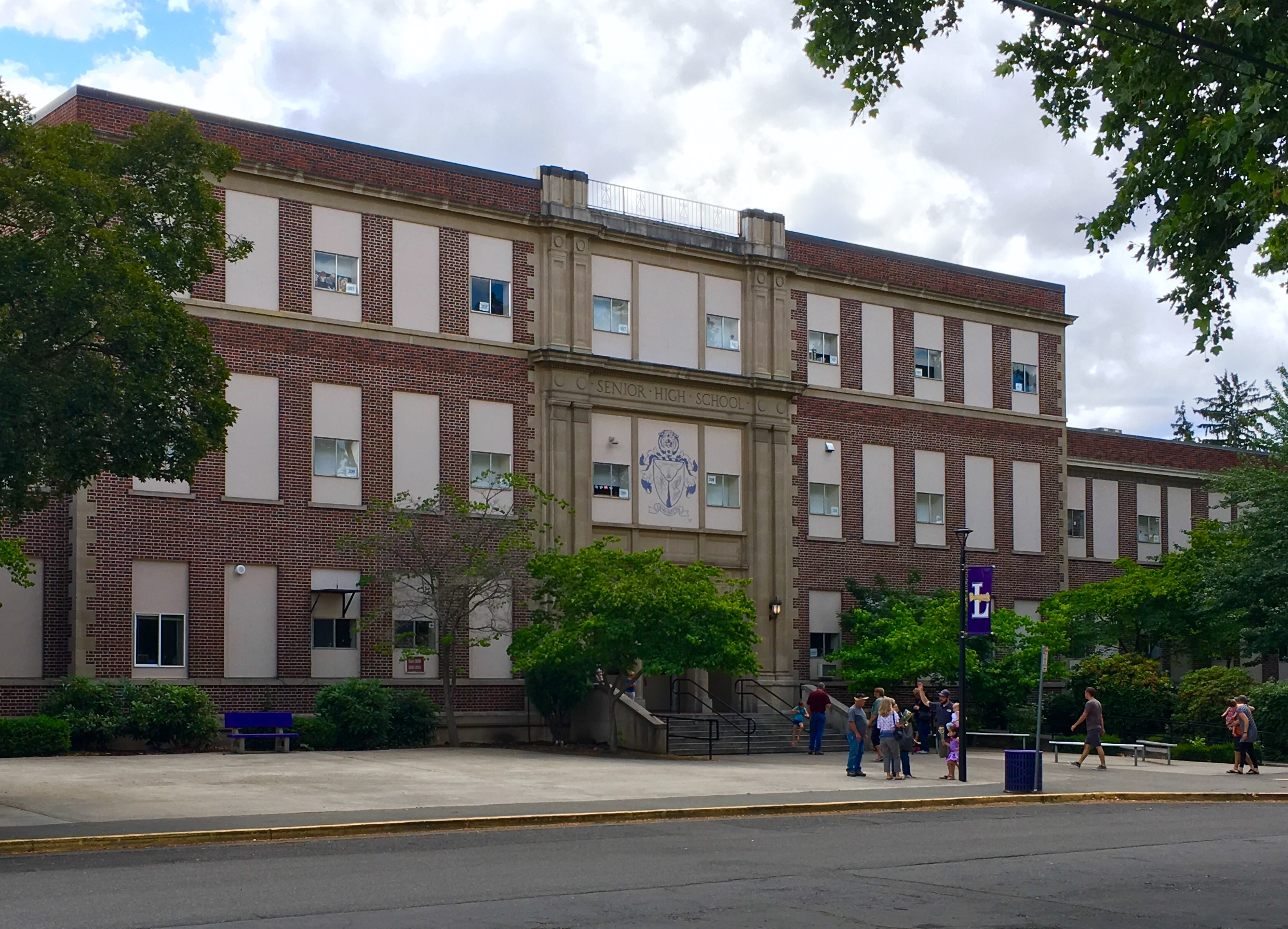
- North entrance of former campus

Location
- 3201 Cecil Andrus Way; Lewiston, Idaho; U.S. 46.388°N 116.973°W

Information
- Type: Public
- Established: 1888, 1928, 2020 (current)
- School district: Lewiston S.D. #1 (340)
- Principal: Kevin Driskil
- Teaching staff: 76.30 (FTE)
- Grades: 9–12
- Enrollment: 1,288
- Student to teacher ratio: 17.55
- Colors: Purple and gold
- Athletics: IHSAA Class 5A
- Athletics conference: Inland Empire League (IEL 5A)
- Mascot: Joe Bengal
- Rivals: Clarkston, Moscow, Coeur d'Alene
- Newspaper: The Bengal's Purr
- Yearbook: The Bengal
- Feeder schools: Jenifer Middle; Sacajawea Middle
- Elevation: 1,400 ft (425 m) AMSL
- Website: www.lewistonschools.net/o/lhs

Lewiston High School is a four-year public high school in Lewiston, Idaho, the only traditional high school in the Lewiston School District. The school's mascot is the Bengal, and the school colors are purple and gold.

== History ==
Lewiston High School was established in 1888. The first publicly known reference to the Bengal mascot was in the local newspaper in early 1925, in reference to the Lewiston basketball team. The former compact campus opened in 1928, and LHS athletics were conducted at various venues in the city.

In 2020, the 1928 building built on 1114 Ninth Avenue closed after 92 years of service. The new campus was built on 3201 Cecil Andrus Way, approximately two miles (3 km) southeast of the former campus.

== Demographics ==
As of 2026, Lewiston High School has a student population of 1,288 that is 0.2% Pacific Islander, 0.6% Asian, 0.6% black, 1.5% Native American, 4.7% Hispanic, 5.3% multiracial, and 87.1% white. The graduation rate is 92%.

== Athletics ==
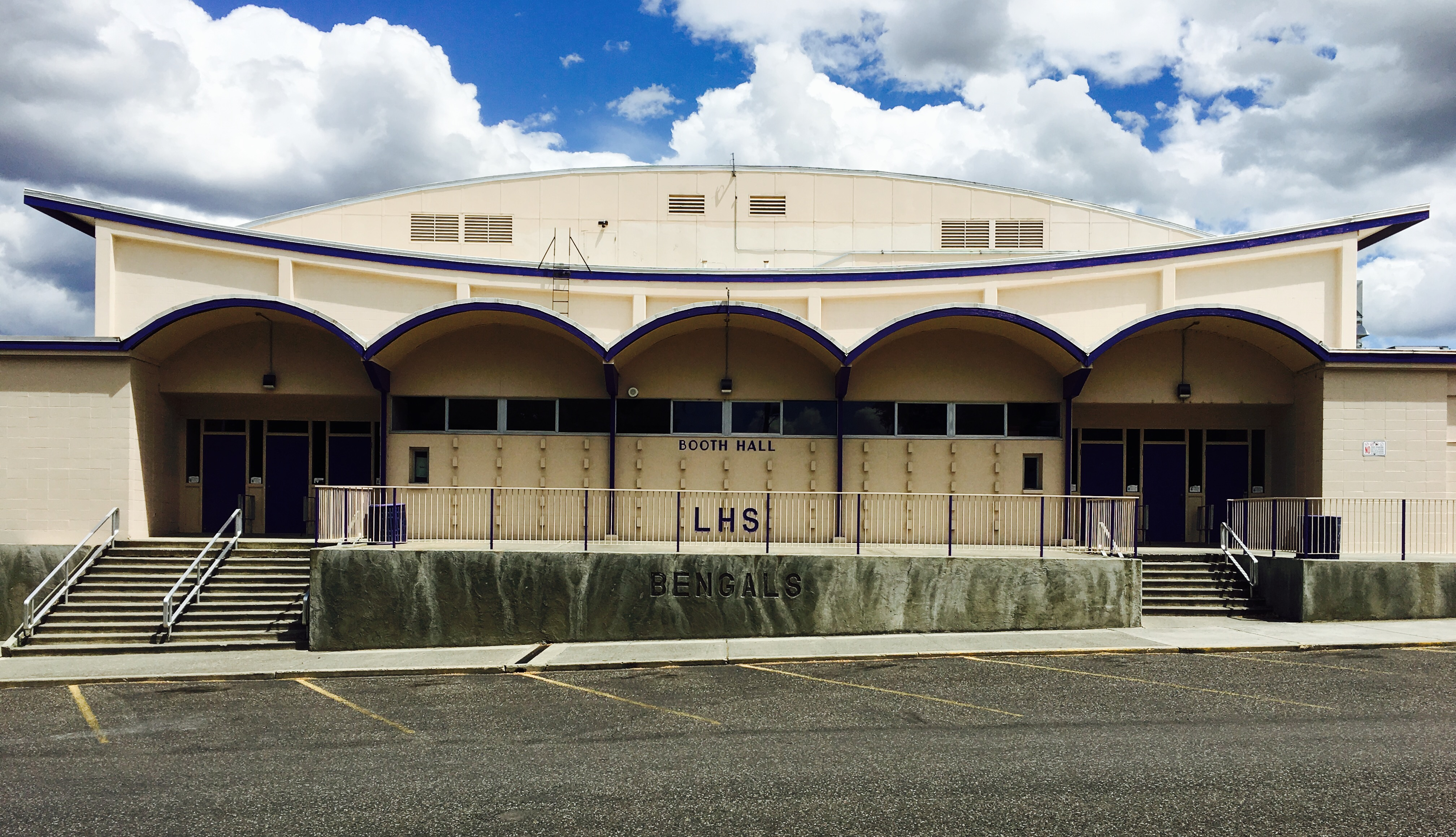
Booth Hall, former gymnasium building in 2016

Lewiston competes in IHSAA Class 5A with the 2nd largest schools in the state, and its conference is the Inland Empire League (5A) with Moscow, Sandpoint, and Lakeland; Lewiston has long-term rivalries with adjacent high schools Clarkston and Moscow, about thirty miles (50 km) north on the adjoining Palouse. The football rivalry with Clarkston started 120 years ago in 1906, and was formerly played on Thanksgiving day.

During football season, Lewiston hosts the "Battle of the Bridges," a football game in which the Lewiston Bengals go against Clarkston High School's Bantams.

During basketball season, Lewiston High School hosts the "Golden Throne" game against Clarkston. The winning school is decided on student-section spirit (cheers, rule-following, sportsmanship, etc.) and points scored during the basketball game. The winning school is given the "Golden Throne," which is a golden toilet placed upon a stand with each year in plaques with the winning school's colors as the year's background.

=== State titles ===
Boys

- Football (2): 1993, 1996 (A-1 Div.II, now 4A)
- Basketball (4): 1926, 1943 (north), 1948, 2009
- Baseball (12): 1947, 1949, 1971, 1972, 1973, 1977, 1979 1984, 1986, 1993, 1995, 2006
  (baseball records not kept by IHSAA, state tourney in late 1940s, canceled in 1950, re-introduced in 1971)
- Track (5): 1918, 1919, 1920, 1938, 1956
- Golf (5): 1971, 1984, 1986, 1987, 1995
- Tennis (1): 2013
- Wrestling (1): 2012

Girls

- Volleyball (2): 2012, 2013
- Golf (3): 1999, 2010, 2012
- Basketball (3): 1976, 2011, 2012

== Notable alumni ==
- Jeep Brett (class of 1932), NFL end
- Jimmy Farris (class of 1996), NFL wide receiver
- Mike Kingsley, member of the Idaho House of Representatives
- Brad Lebo, Arena Football League quarterback
- Robert D. Leeper, Idaho Supreme Court justice (attended, transferred)
- David Leroy (class of 1965), state attorney general and lieutenant governor
- Robin Lund, Major League Baseball pitching coach
- Lori McCann, member of the Idaho House of Representatives
- Jake Scott (class of 1999), NFL guard
