= Lewiston–Nez Perce County Airport =

Airport in Idaho, United States

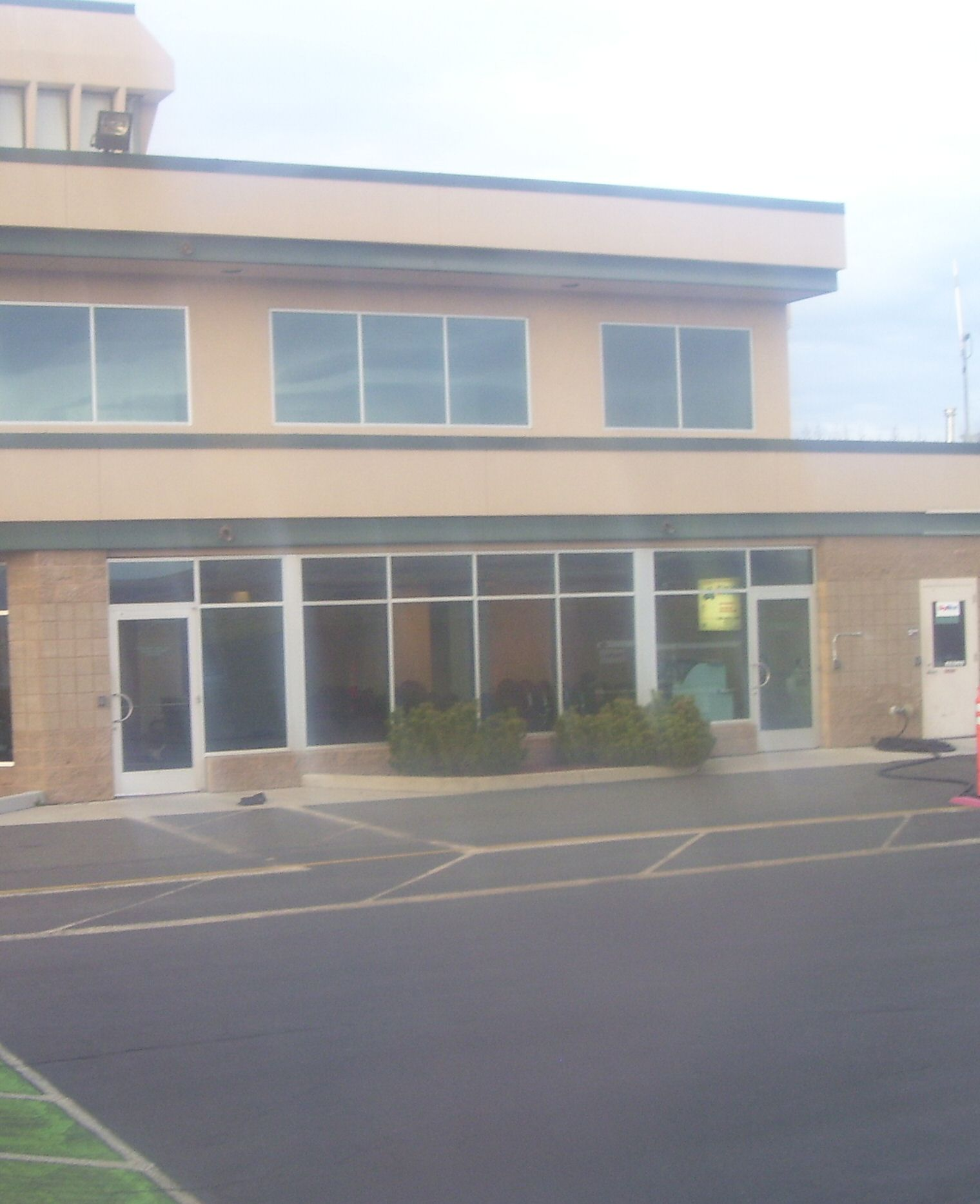
- Terminal in March 2006
- IATA: LWS; ICAO: KLWS; FAA LID: LWS; WMO: 72783

Summary
- Airport type: Public
- Owner: City of Lewiston & Nez Perce County, Idaho, U.S.
- Serves: Lewiston-Clarkston metropolitan area
- Elevation AMSL: 1,442 ft (440 m)
- Coordinates: 46°22′28″N 117°00′55″W

Map
- Location in Idaho Location in the United States

Runways
Direction	Length		Surface
Direction	ft	m	Surface
8/26	6,511	1,985	Asphalt
12/30	5,002	1,525	Asphalt

Statistics (2018)
- Aircraft operations: 28,751
- Based aircraft: 145
- Source: Federal Aviation Administration

Lewiston–Nez Perce County Airport (IATA: LWS, ICAO: KLWS, FAA LID: LWS) is a public airport in the northwest United States, in north-central Idaho. Owned by the city of Lewiston and Nez Perce County, it is in an elevated area of the city two miles (3 km) south of downtown, approximately 700 vertical feet (210 m) above the Snake and Clearwater rivers.

The National Plan of Integrated Airport Systems for 2011–2015 categorized it as a primary commercial service airport. Federal Aviation Administration records indicate the airport had 64,379 passenger boardings (enplanements) in calendar year 2008, 62,210 in 2009, and 61,737 in 2010.

== History ==
Dedicated in 1928, the airport began as a Chamber of Commerce project in 1931, and the original runway was paved in 1942. Jet service arrived in October 1969 after the completion of the 6,500-foot (1,980 m) runway 8/26. The air traffic control tower, southeast of the terminal, was commissioned in September 1974.

Zimmerly Air Transport began scheduled service in 1944 at Lewiston, flying intrastate routes in Cessna Airmasters, and then became Empire Airlines in 1946, and moved to Boeing 247 prop aircraft. Two years later it changed to larger Douglas DC-3 prop aircraft, and was then acquired by Seattle's West Coast Airlines in 1952.

Lewiston was served by West Coast's Fairchild F-27 turboprops in the 1960s. West Coast then merged with Bonanza Air Lines and Pacific Air Lines to form Air West in 1968; the San Francisco–based airline was subsequently acquired by Howard Hughes in April 1970, and was soon renamed Hughes Airwest.

Early jet service was flown by Hughes Airwest Douglas DC-9-10s and McDonnell Douglas DC-9-30s and later by Cascade Airways BAC One-Elevens, supplemented with turboprop aircraft operated by both airlines. Hughes Airwest merged into Republic Airlines in October 1980, which then subsequently cut back its jet service in Idaho and elsewhere in the western U.S. According to its August 1, 1982 system timetable, Republic was operating just two daily departures from the airport, both with Douglas DC-9-10 jets, with nonstop service to Spokane (GEG) with this flight continuing on direct to Seattle (SEA) as well as nonstop service to Boise (BOI) with this flight operating direct no change of plane service to Twin Falls, ID (TWF), Salt Lake City (SLC) and Burbank, CA (BUR) in the Los Angeles area. Republic's final flight to Lewiston was in September 1982, and the airline ended its southern Idaho and eastern Washington service the following April. Cascade, based in Spokane, served Lewiston from 1973, until it ceased operations in 1986. According to the Official Airline Guide (OAG), Cascade was operating international service of a sorts into the airport in early 1985 with a direct flight once a week from Calgary via an intermediate stop in Spokane.

The short-lived Gem State Airlines of Coeur d'Alene served Lewiston for eleven months, until November 1979. Mountain West Airlines of Boise served Lewiston for less than three months before folding in early March 1981. Big Sky Airlines of Billings briefly served Lewiston in 1979. All three commuter air carriers operated turboprop aircraft into the airport.

Adjacent to the west, Bryden Canyon municipal golf course was built in the early 1970s, and opened in March 1975. Just west of runway 8/26 is the private Lewiston Country Club, which moved to the site in 1974 with a new 18-hole course. Its previous nine-hole course of 1927, nearby to the north and west of Bryden Canyon, was closed and later developed into residential housing.

From the late 1960s to the mid-1970s, a regional airport for the Quad Cities (Lewiston–Clarkston, Moscow–Pullman) was explored, but the city council of Lewiston withdrew its support of the study in October 1974. The Pullman–Moscow airport is about 25 miles (40 km) north.

=== Airline service in the 1970s ===
According to the Official Airline Guide (OAG), the only airline serving Lewiston in the spring of 1975 was Hughes Airwest with four daily jet flights, three operated with the McDonnell Douglas DC-9-30 and one operated with the smaller Douglas DC-9-10, with nonstop service from Boise (BOI) and Spokane (GEG), one stop service from Salt Lake City (SLC), Seattle (SEA) and Twin Falls, ID (TWF), and direct no change of plane service from the John Wayne Airport (SNA) in Orange County, CA as well as direct from Phoenix (PHX) and Tucson (TUS) in Arizona.

Gem State Airlines also provided non-stop service to Boise and Pullman in the late 1970s.

=== Airline service in 1985 ===
The Official Airline Guide lists two airlines serving Lewiston in early 1985 including Cascade Airways operating British Aircraft Corporation BAC One-Eleven jets and Beechcraft 1900C turboprops with nonstop service from Boise (BOI), Pasco, WA (PSC), Pullman, WA (PUW), Seattle (SEA), Spokane (GEG) Walla Walla, WA (ALW) and Yakima (YKM), and Horizon Air operating as an independent air carrier with nonstop Fairchild Swearingen Metroliner turboprop service from Boise (BOI) Pasco (PSC), Pullman (PUW), Seattle (SEA) and Spokane (GEG). The OAG lists a combined total of 20 flights every weekday operated by the two airlines into the airport at this time primarily flown with small commuter propjet aircraft. In addition, the OAG lists only one Cascade Airways BAC One-Eleven jet flight a day into the airport at this time which was a direct one stop service from Seattle via an intermediate stop in Pasco.

=== Airline service in 1995 ===
According to the Official Airline Guide, two airlines were serving Lewiston in the spring of 1995 including Empire Airlines (which was based in Coeur d'Alene, ID at the time and is currently based in Hayden, ID) with this commuter air carrier operating Fairchild Swearingen Metroliner turboprops on nonstop flights from Boise (BOI) and Coeur d'Alene (COE), and Horizon Air operating code sharing service on behalf of Alaska Airlines with de Havilland Canada DHC-8 Dash 8 and Fairchild Swearingen Metroliner turboprops with nonstop flights from Boise (BOI), Portland, OR (PDX), Pullman (PUW) and Seattle (SEA). The OAG lists a combined total of 27 flights every weekday operated by the two airlines into the airport at this time, all flown with propjet aircraft.

== Facilities ==
The airport covers 865 acres (3.5 km^{2}) at an elevation of 1,442 feet (440 m). It has two asphalt runways: 8/26 is 6,511 by 150 feet (1,985 m × 46 m) and 12/30 is 5,002 by 100 feet (1,525 m × 30 m).

In the year ending January 1, 2012, the airport had 35,425 aircraft operations, average 97 per day: 77% general aviation, 13% air taxi, 8% airline and 2% military. 145 aircraft were then based at the airport: 81% single-engine, 10% helicopter, 8% multi-engine, and 1% jet.

== Incidents ==
On September 17, 2021, a Boeing 737-800 owned by United Airlines tipped over at LWS when deboarding the aircraft. Passengers were deboarding from the back of the plane, but the aircraft lacked a tail-stand for the back of the plane. The additional weight from the passengers caused the plane to tip.

== Airlines and destinations ==
=== Passenger ===
Airlines	Destinations
Delta Connection	Salt Lake City, Seattle/Tacoma

Destinations map
Destinations from Lewiston-Nez Perce County Airport
Red = Year-round destination
Green = Seasonal destination
Blue = Future destination

=== Cargo ===
Airlines	Destinations
Ameriflight	Seattle–Boeing
FedEx Express	Spokane
Western Air Express	Boise

Horizon Air served Lewiston from March 1983 to August 2018 with scheduled passenger flights initially as an independent air carrier and later via a code sharing agreement on behalf of Alaska Airlines. SkyWest Airlines started service to Lewiston in June 1996 as Delta Connection but only for a year, and then returned with Delta Connection service in January 2005.

According to the Flight Aware website, SkyWest currently operates code sharing passenger service from the airport as the Delta Connection with Embraer 175 regional jets on behalf of Delta Air Lines.

== Top destinations ==
Busiest routes from LWS (September 2024 – August 2025)
Rank	City	Passengers	Carrier
1	Seattle, WA	19,860	Delta Connection
2	Salt Lake City, UT	16,840	Delta Connection
3	Denver, CO	8,030	United Express

== See also ==
- List of airports in Idaho
