= Lewiston School District =

School district in Idaho, United States

Lewiston School District #1

Location
- 3317 12th Street Lewiston, Idaho, 83501; United States
- Coordinates: 46.3822°N 116.9702°W

District information
- Type: Public
- Established: 1880; 145 years ago
- Superintendent: Lance Hansen (2021–present)
- Budget: $41 million
- NCES District ID: 1601860

Students and staff
- Students: 4,578 (2020-2021)
- Student–teacher ratio: 16.01
- Athletic conference: Inland Empire League (Class 5A)

Other information
- Website: www.lewistonschools.net

Lewiston School District #1 is the school district in Lewiston, Idaho. It has seven elementary schools, two middle schools, one high school, and one alternative high school. Established 145 years ago in 1880 by the territorial legislature, the school district is the state's oldest; it preceded Idaho statehood by ten years.

== Schools ==
=== High schools ===
- Lewiston High School (2020, grades 9–12; previous 1928, 1888)
- Tammany High School, (1937)

=== Middle schools ===
(grades 6–8)

- Jenifer Middle School (1959)
- Sacajawea Middle School (1959)

=== Elementary schools ===
(grades K–5)

- Camelot (1969)
- Centennial (1962)
- McGhee (1948)
- McSorley (1966)
- Orchards (1956)
- Webster (1948)
- Whitman (1948)
