= Lewiston, Idaho =

Lewiston
- City
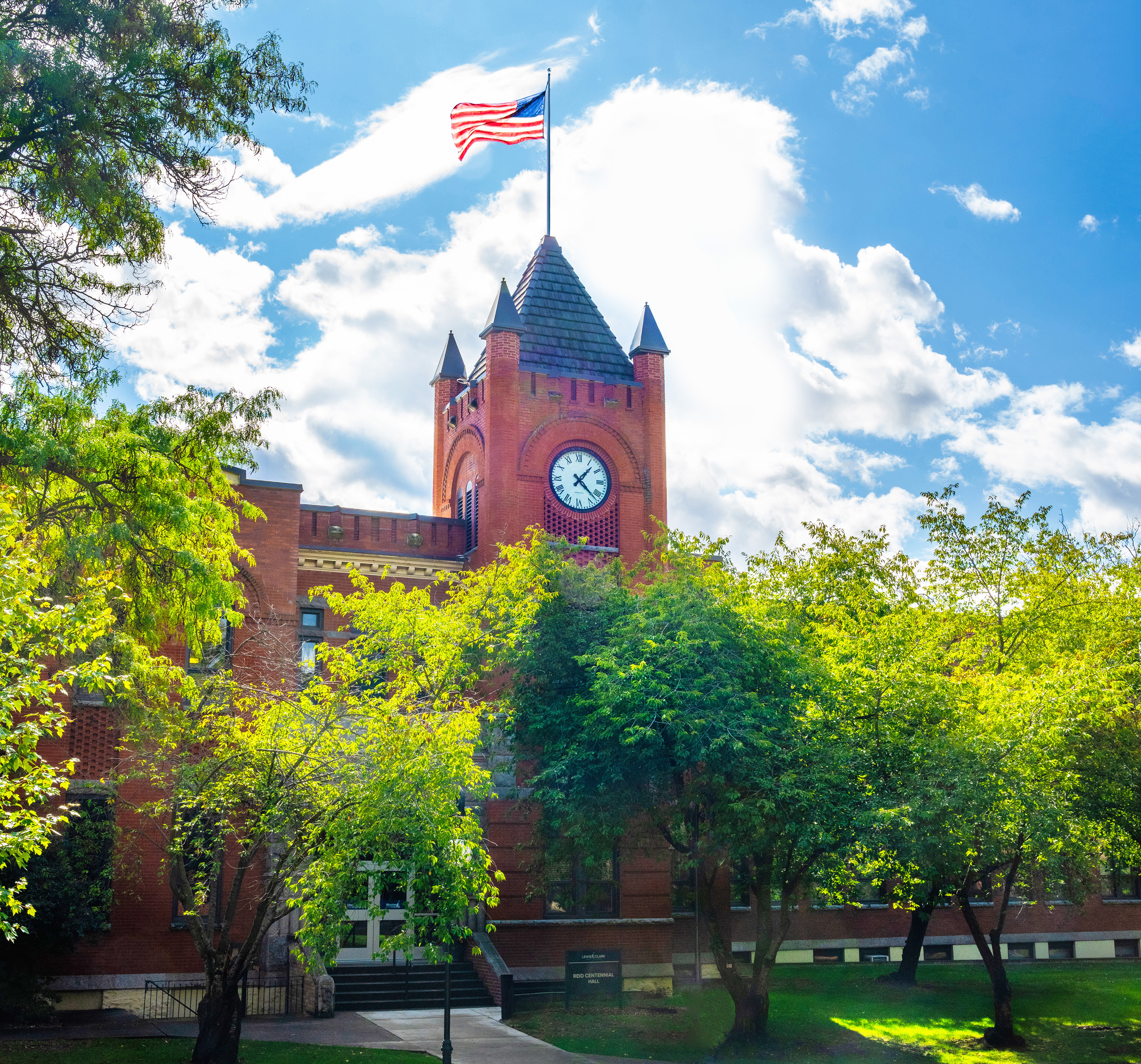
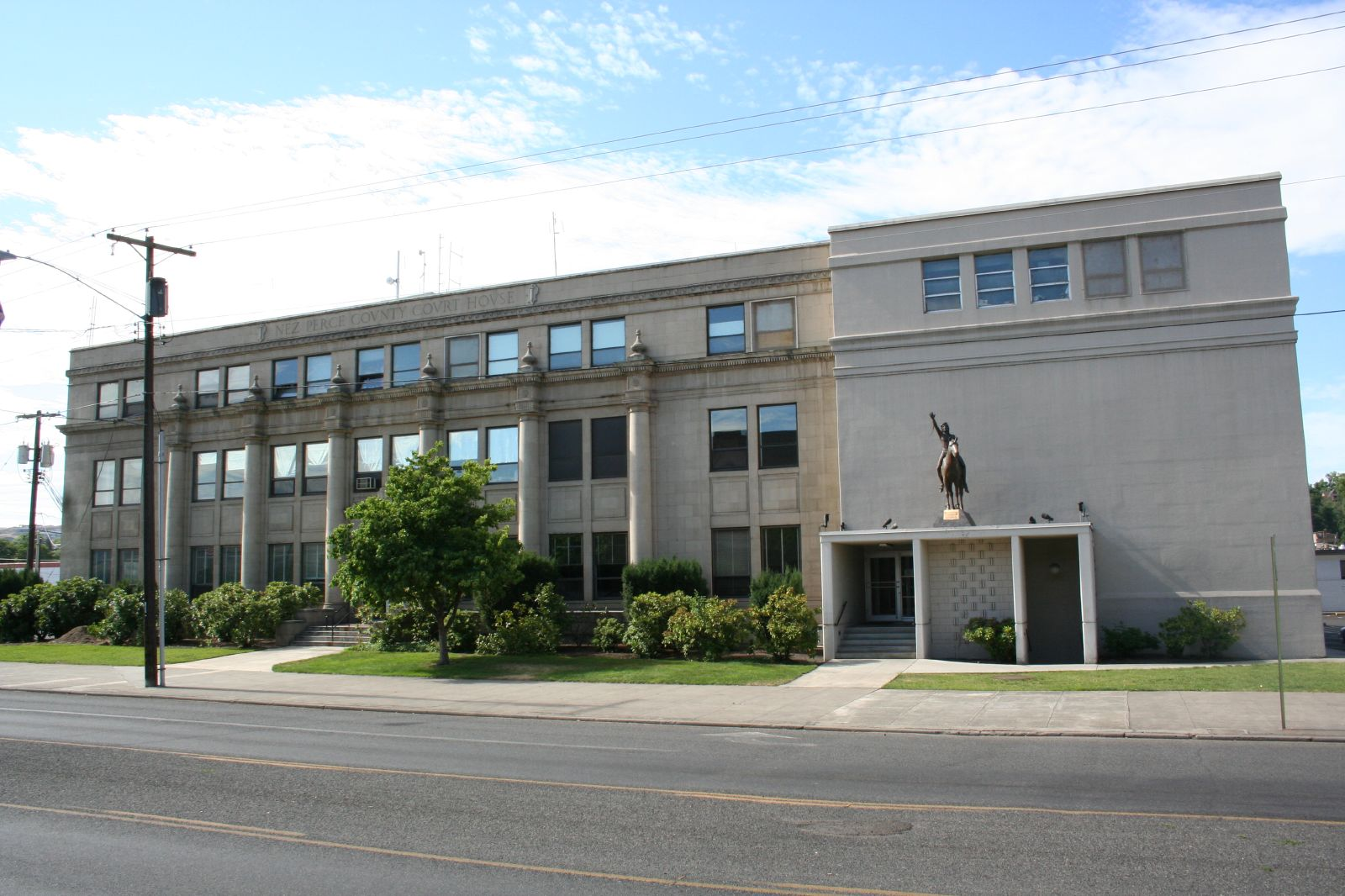
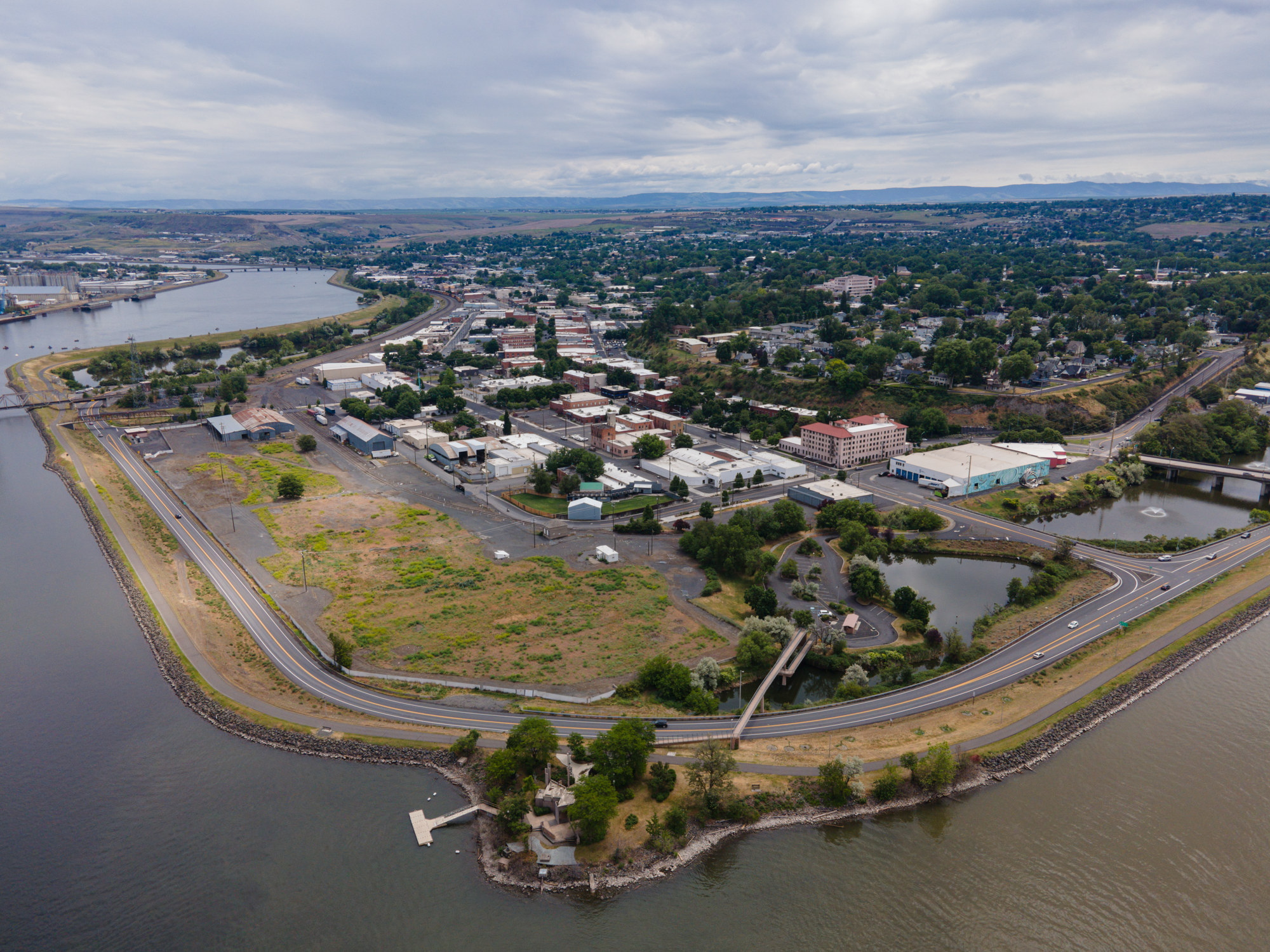
- Reid Hall Clock Tower at Lewis–Clark State College Nez Perce County Courthouse Aerial of Lewiston and the Port of Lewiston

- Seal
- Nicknames: L-Town, River City
- Location of Lewiston in Nez Perce County, Idaho

- Location in the United States Location in Idaho
- Coordinates: 46.41°N 117.02°W
- Country: United States
- State: Idaho
- County: Nez Perce
- Founded: 1861; 165 years ago
- Incorporated: 1861
- Named for: Meriwether Lewis

Government
  - Type: Strong-Mayor
  - Mayor: Dan G. Johnson

Area
  - City: 18.10 sq mi (46.89 km^{2})
  - Land: 17.30 sq mi (44.81 km^{2})
  - Water: 0.80 sq mi (2.08 km^{2})
- Elevation: 745 ft (227 m)

Population (2020)
  - City: 34,203
  - Density: 1,895.1/sq mi (731.71/km^{2})
  - Metro: 61,476 (US: 365th)
- Time zone: UTC−8 (PST)
  - Summer (DST): UTC−7 (PDT)
- ZIP code: 83501
- Area codes: 208, 986
- FIPS code: 16-46540
- GNIS feature ID: 0396788
- Website: www.cityoflewiston.org

Lewiston is a city in and the county seat of Nez Perce County, Idaho, United States, in the state's north central region. It is the third-largest city in the northern Idaho region, behind Post Falls and Coeur d'Alene, and the twelfth-largest in the state. Lewiston is the principal city of the Lewiston, ID-WA Metropolitan Statistical Area, which includes all of Nez Perce County and Asotin County, Washington. As of the 2020 census, the population of Lewiston was 34,203, up from 31,894 in 2010.

Lewiston is located at the confluence of the Snake River and Clearwater River, thirty miles (50 km) upstream and southeast of the Lower Granite Dam. Dams and locks on the Snake and Columbia Rivers make Lewiston reachable by some ocean-going vessels. The Port of Lewiston is Idaho's only seaport, and is the farthest inland port linked to the Pacific Ocean. The Lewiston–Nez Perce County Airport serves the city by air.

Lewiston was founded in 1861 in the wake of a gold rush which began the previous year near Pierce, northeast of Lewiston. The city was incorporated by the Washington Territorial Legislature in January 1863. In March 1863, Lewiston became the first capital of the newly created Idaho Territory. Its stint as seat of the new territory's government was short-lived, inasmuch as a resolution to move the capital south to Boise was passed by the Idaho Territorial Legislature on December 7, 1864.

Lewiston's main industries are agriculture, paper, and timber products, and light manufacturing. Ammunition manufacturing maintains a very important and growing presence in Lewiston, being the headquarters of ammunition makers CCI and Speer Bullet. The city is the primary regional transportation, retail, health care, and entertainment center of the surrounding area and serves as a recreation destination for the Hells Canyon National Recreation Area.

Lewiston is home to Lewis–Clark State College, a public undergraduate college. Community events in Lewiston include the Dogwood Festival, Hot August Nights, and the Lewiston Roundup.

== History ==
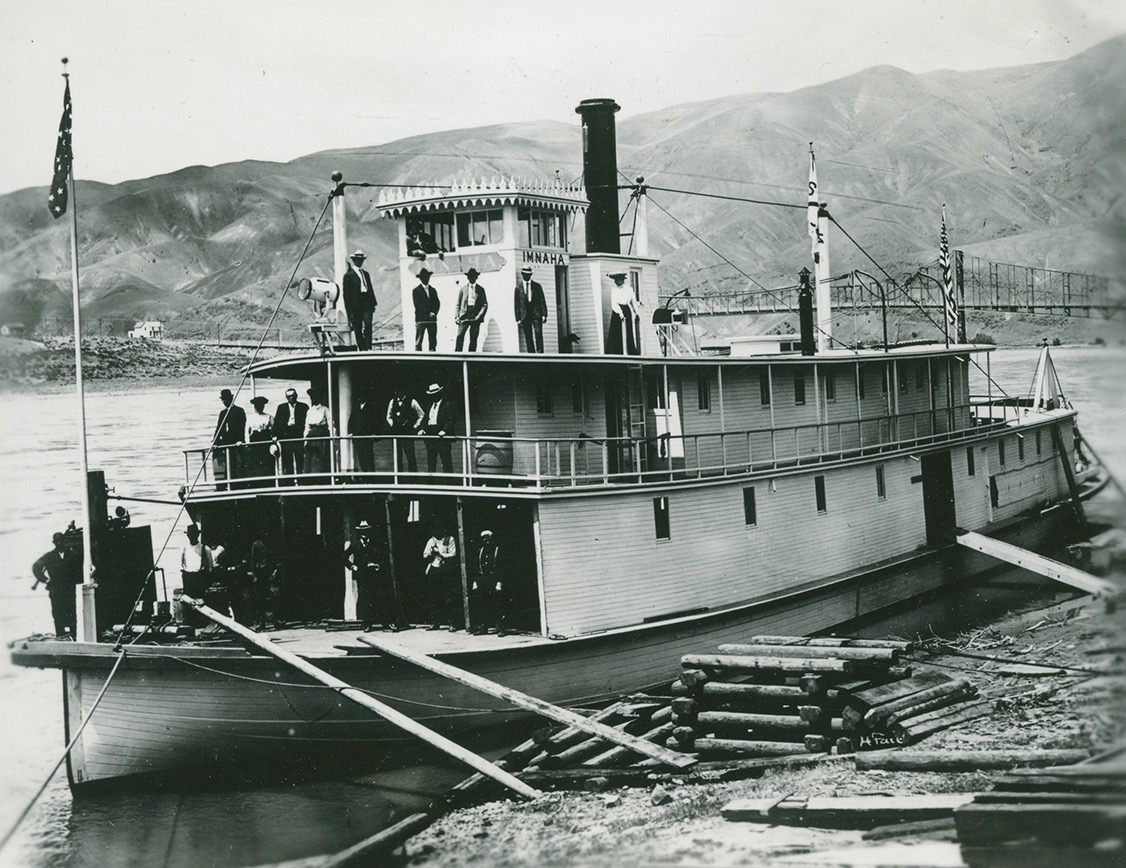
The Imnaha sternwheeler loading cordwood fuel, 1903

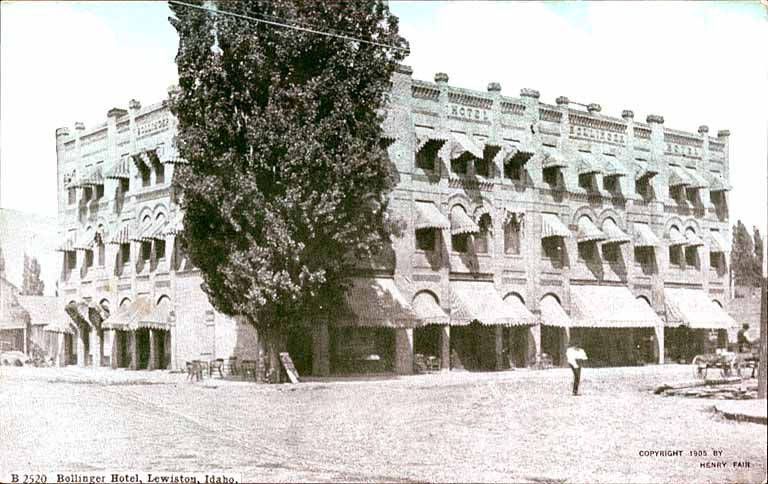
The Bollinger Hotel in 1905. This building was destroyed by fire in 1997.

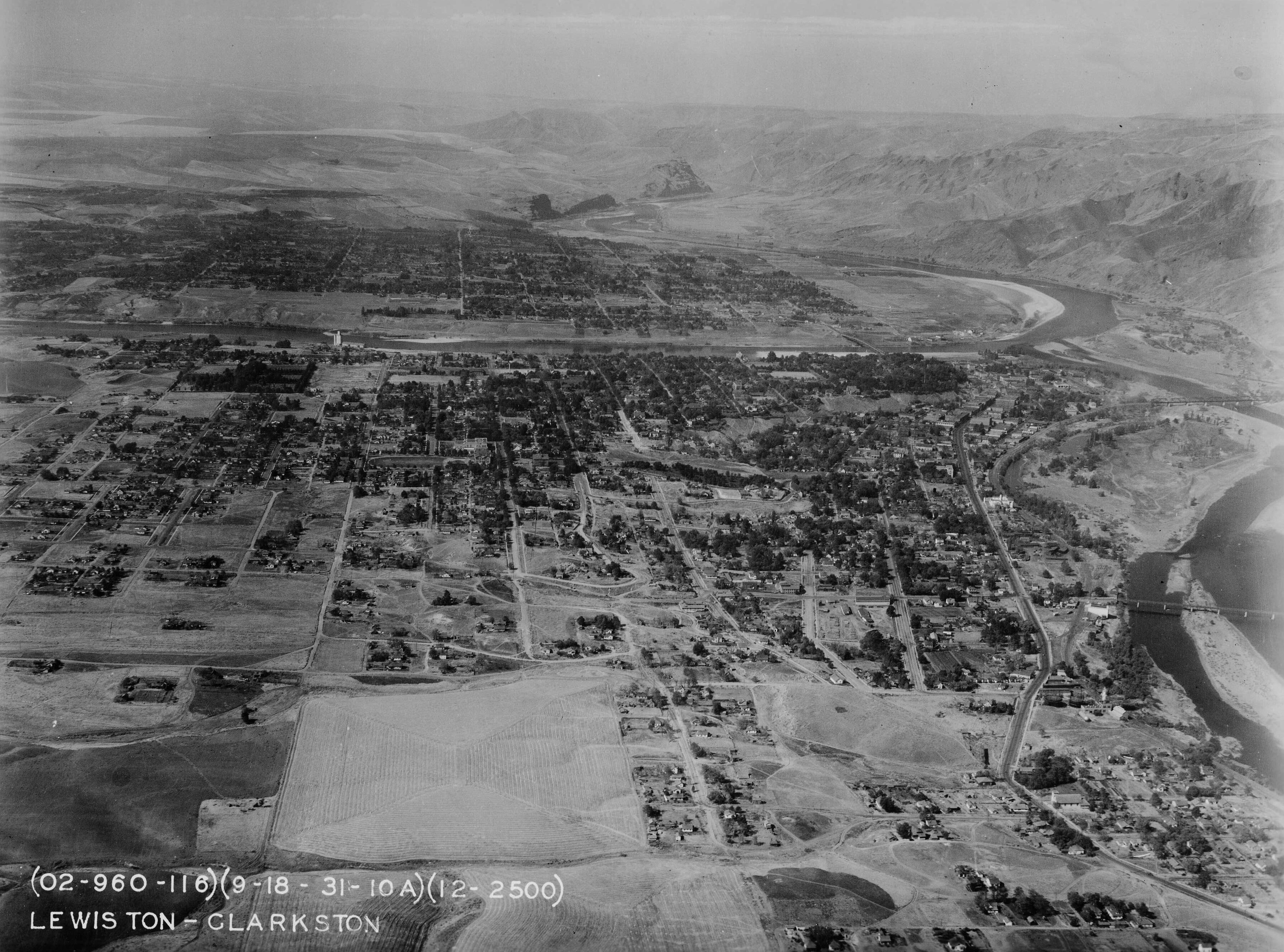
Lewiston, 1936

In August 1860, Elias D. Pierce snuck onto the Nez Perce reservation disguised as an itinerant trader and found gold there. Thousands trespassed into the reservation in search of the gold, and the illegal white encampment of Lewiston was founded in 1861 on the sovereign territory of the Nez Perce. The settlement is believed to have been named after Meriwether Lewis, who camped at the site in October 1805. In local lore, it is claimed that the Nez Pierce word for the area was "Tsceminicum." The Oregon Steam Navigation Company was founded to ferry gold prospectors to the squatter camp and ignored orders from the Nez Perce and U.S. military authorities to cease operations.

In December 1861, Washington Territory illegally annexed large regions of the Nez Perce reservation, including Lewiston, naming it Nez Perce County. In 1862, when it became clear there was no gold in Lewiston, much of the population pushed deeper into Nez Perce territory hunting for new discoveries. However, Lewiston became the first capital of the Idaho Territory in 1863 following the legalization of the occupation. Acting Idaho governor Clinton De Witt Smith was prevented from reaching Lewiston by Plains Indians, and was forced to go by sea to reach the territory. Upon his eventual arrival in the Idaho Territory in 1864 he named Boise the new capital, to the annoyance of the people of Lewiston. In 1877, the town was briefly affected by the Nez Perce War.

The City of Lewiston’s high reservoir failed on January 18, 2023. The failure caused flooding with the release of approximately three million US gallons (11,000,000 L; 2,500,000 imp gal) of water.

== Geography ==
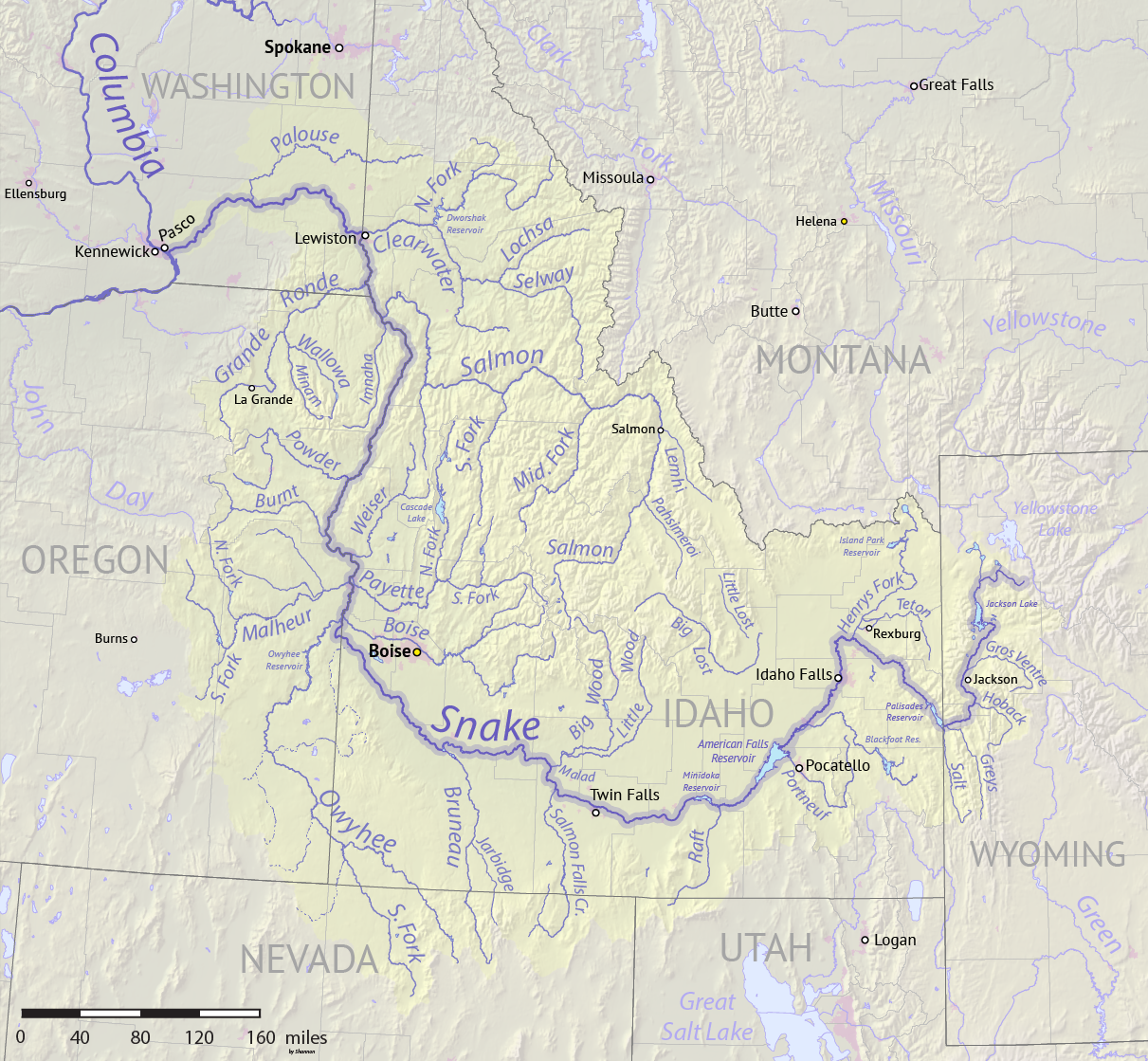
Snake River watershed

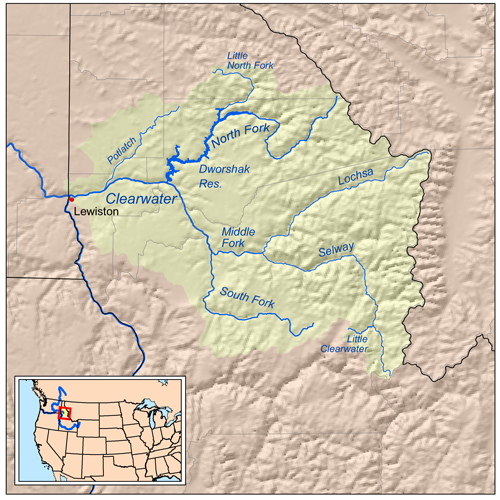
Clearwater River drainage in north central Idaho

Lewiston is located at the confluence of the Snake and Clearwater rivers. Immediately west of Lewiston is the smaller twin city of Clarkston, Washington. The north-flowing Snake River departs Hells Canyon and forms the state boundary with Washington, while west-flowing Clearwater River defines the northern border of the city. At their confluence at the city's northwest corner, the lower Snake River turns west into Washington, and after passing four dams, empties into the Columbia River at Burbank.

About Thirty miles (50 km) northwest of the city is the Lower Granite Dam, the last and upper-most of the four dams on the lower Snake River. It was completed 51 years ago in 1975, creating a reservoir, Lower Granite Lake that stretches to Lewiston.

According to the U.S. Census Bureau, the city has a total area of 18.04 square miles (46.72 km^{2}), of which 17.23 square miles (44.63 km^{2}) is land and 0.81 square miles (2.10 km^{2}) is water. Downtown Lewiston, at elevations between 740 feet (230 m) and 780 feet (240 m), is only slightly higher in elevation than the river, about 741 ft (226 m), which was thirty feet (9 m) lower prior to the completion of the Lower Granite Dam. Away from downtown the terrain gains elevation quickly, as the steep riverbank highway of U.S. 95 north of Lewiston ascends to 2,756 feet (840 m).

The lowest point in the state of Idaho is located on the Snake River in Lewiston, where it meets the Clearwater and flows west into Washington. The populated areas in Idaho with the lowest elevations are along (or near) the Clearwater River, from Lowell at 1,486 feet (453 m) to Lewiston.

=== The Orchards ===
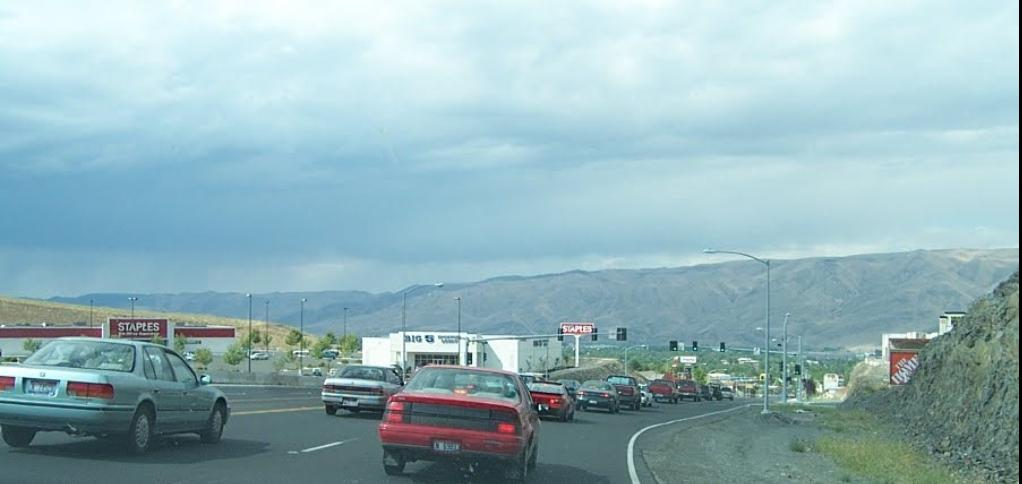
Traffic heading down "Thain Grade" in 2002. This is the road connecting the Lewiston Orchards with the lower elevation area of downtown Lewiston. Lewiston Hill can be seen on the opposite side of the Clearwater River and around the bend of the Snake River.

The heavily residential southern half of the city is referred to as "The Orchards". This area is much higher in elevation than downtown, at about 1,400 ft (425 m), and is named for the fruit orchards that previously covered the area. Formerly unincorporated, it was annexed in late 1969, which nearly doubled the city's population and doubled the area of the city. The original farming development took up 9,000 acres (14.1 sq mi), with the residential neighborhood spanning roughly 8 to 9 square miles as of 2020. There is little sign of any orchards today, although there is a wide proliferation of fruit trees in the backyards of many residences in this area of town. The Lewiston-Nez Perce County Airport is located on the western edge of the Orchards plateau at 1,438 feet (438 m) above sea level, with Bryden Canyon Road providing westbound access via the Southway Bridge into Clarkston. As of 2000, the area has a population of approximately 18,500 people .

=== Climate ===
Lewiston experiences a semi-arid climate (Köppen BSk) with occasionally cold, but short winters, mostly influenced by mild Pacific air, and hot, dry summers. The monthly daily average temperature ranges from 35.2 °F (1.8 °C) in December to 75.8 °F (24.3 °C) in July; the temperature reaches 100 °F (38 °C) on 7.7 afternoons, 90 °F (32 °C) on 42 afternoons, and does not rise above freezing on 14 afternoons annually. The last year that Lewiston did not reach 100 °F (37.8 °C) was back in 1995. Precipitation averages 12.31 inches (31 cm) annually, including an average seasonal snowfall of 10.5 inches (27 cm).

At 195 days, the growing season is relatively long, with the average window for freezing temperatures being October 23 thru April 10. The plant hardiness zone of Lewiston is 7b with some pockets of 8a. Temperatures below 0 °F (−18 °C) are quite rare. Extreme temperatures range from −23 °F (−31 °C) on December 13, 1919 to 117 °F (47 °C) on July 27, 1939. Tornadoes are very rare with only three tornadoes being reported in Nez Perce County since 1950, and the only significant tornado was an F2 in Lapwai on May 8, 1962.

Climate data for Lewiston–Nez Perce County Airport, Idaho (1991−2020 normals, (Note: Mean monthly maxima and minima (i.e. the highest and lowest temperature readings during an entire month or year) calculated based on data at said location from 1991 to 2020.) extremes 1881−present)
Month	Jan	Feb	Mar	Apr	May	Jun	Jul	Aug	Sep	Oct	Nov	Dec	Year
Record high °F (°C)	66 (19)	72 (22)	80 (27)	98 (37)	104 (40)	115 (46)	117 (47)	115 (46)	108 (42)	94 (34)	77 (25)	67 (19)	117 (47)
Mean maximum °F (°C)	56.1 (13.4)	59.4 (15.2)	69.1 (20.6)	79.1 (26.2)	88.9 (31.6)	96.2 (35.7)	103.8 (39.9)	103.5 (39.7)	95.2 (35.1)	80.0 (26.7)	63.0 (17.2)	55.5 (13.1)	105.3 (40.7)
Mean daily maximum °F (°C)	42.1 (5.6)	47.0 (8.3)	55.1 (12.8)	62.3 (16.8)	72.0 (22.2)	79.0 (26.1)	90.8 (32.7)	90.1 (32.3)	79.5 (26.4)	63.0 (17.2)	48.7 (9.3)	40.8 (4.9)	64.2 (17.9)
Daily mean °F (°C)	36.2 (2.3)	39.3 (4.1)	45.4 (7.4)	51.5 (10.8)	60.0 (15.6)	66.5 (19.2)	75.8 (24.3)	75.2 (24.0)	65.9 (18.8)	52.5 (11.4)	41.6 (5.3)	35.2 (1.8)	53.8 (12.1)
Mean daily minimum °F (°C)	30.3 (−0.9)	31.7 (−0.2)	35.7 (2.1)	40.7 (4.8)	48.1 (8.9)	54.0 (12.2)	60.9 (16.1)	60.3 (15.7)	52.3 (11.3)	42.0 (5.6)	34.5 (1.4)	29.5 (−1.4)	43.3 (6.3)
Mean minimum °F (°C)	14.8 (−9.6)	18.2 (−7.7)	24.6 (−4.1)	30.9 (−0.6)	36.2 (2.3)	44.1 (6.7)	50.7 (10.4)	49.9 (9.9)	40.4 (4.7)	28.2 (−2.1)	20.8 (−6.2)	14.5 (−9.7)	7.5 (−13.6)
Record low °F (°C)	−22 (−30)	−18 (−28)	2 (−17)	20 (−7)	23 (−5)	34 (1)	41 (5)	41 (5)	27 (−3)	15 (−9)	−3 (−19)	−23 (−31)	−23 (−31)
Average precipitation inches (mm)	1.13 (29)	1.04 (26)	1.30 (33)	1.44 (37)	1.69 (43)	1.25 (32)	0.47 (12)	0.51 (13)	0.60 (15)	1.08 (27)	1.23 (31)	1.13 (29)	12.87 (327)
Average snowfall inches (cm)	2.7 (6.9)	3.8 (9.7)	0.8 (2.0)	0.0 (0.0)	0.0 (0.0)	0.0 (0.0)	0.0 (0.0)	0.0 (0.0)	0.0 (0.0)	0.0 (0.0)	1.3 (3.3)	4.1 (10)	12.7 (32)
Average precipitation days (≥ 0.01 in)	11.2	9.6	11.7	11.3	10.6	8.9	3.9	3.4	4.7	8.7	11.1	11.1	106.2
Average snowy days (≥ 0.1 in)	2.3	3.1	1.0	0.0	0.0	0.0	0.0	0.0	0.0	0.0	1.0	3.6	11.0
Average dew point °F (°C)	25.3 (−3.7)	27.0 (−2.8)	32.9 (0.5)	33.3 (0.7)	41.0 (5.0)	46.6 (8.1)	46.6 (8.1)	43.7 (6.5)	41.0 (5.0)	39.2 (4.0)	32.5 (0.3)	29.3 (−1.5)	36.5 (2.5)
Source 1: NOAA (dew point 1961–1990)
Source 2: National Weather Service

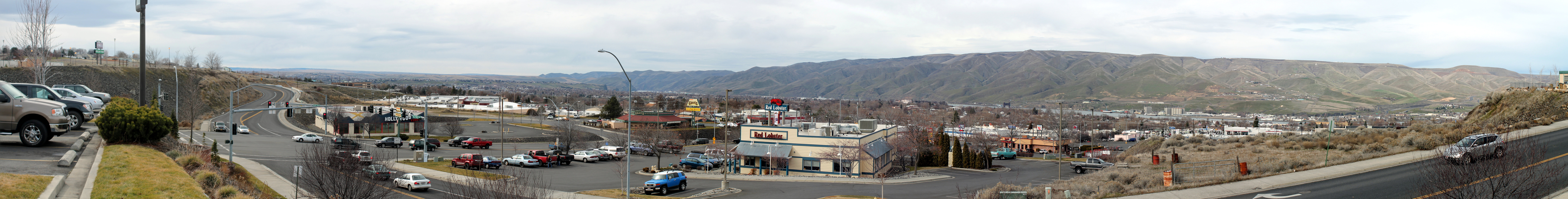
Lewiston and sister city Clarkston, Washington; looking northwest

== Demographics ==
=== 2020 census ===
As of the 2020 census, Lewiston had a population of 34,203. The median age was 39.9 years. 5.4% of residents were under age 5, 21.3% were under 18, and 20.7% were 65 years of age or older. For every 100 females there were 95.2 males, and for every 100 females age 18 and over there were 93.5 males age 18 and over.

99.4% of residents lived in urban areas, while 0.6% lived in rural areas.

There were 14,176 households in Lewiston, of which 27.2% had children under the age of 18 living in them. Of all households, 45.4% were married-couple households, 19.8% were households with a male householder and no spouse or partner present, and 26.4% were households with a female householder and no spouse or partner present. About 31.2% of all households were made up of individuals and 14.3% had someone living alone who was 65 years of age or older.

There were 14,836 housing units, of which 4.4% were vacant. The homeowner vacancy rate was 0.7% and the rental vacancy rate was 5.0%.

Racial composition as of the 2020 census
Race	Number	Percent
White	30,545	89.3%
Black or African American	175	0.5%
American Indian and Alaska Native	630	1.8%
Asian	306	0.9%
Native Hawaiian and Other Pacific Islander	33	0.1%
Some other race	355	1.0%
Two or more races	2,159	6.3%
Hispanic or Latino (of any race)	1,403	4.1%

Historical population
Census	Pop.	Note	%±
1880	739		—
1890	849		14.9%
1900	2,425		185.6%
1910	6,043		149.2%
1920	6,574		8.8%
1930	9,403		43.0%
1940	10,548		12.2%
1950	12,985		23.1%
1960	12,691		−2.3%
1970	26,068		105.4%
1980	27,986		7.4%
1990	28,082		0.3%
2000	30,904		10.0%
2010	31,894		3.2%
2020	34,203		7.2%
U.S. Decennial Census; Orchards annexed in late 1969.

=== 2010 census ===
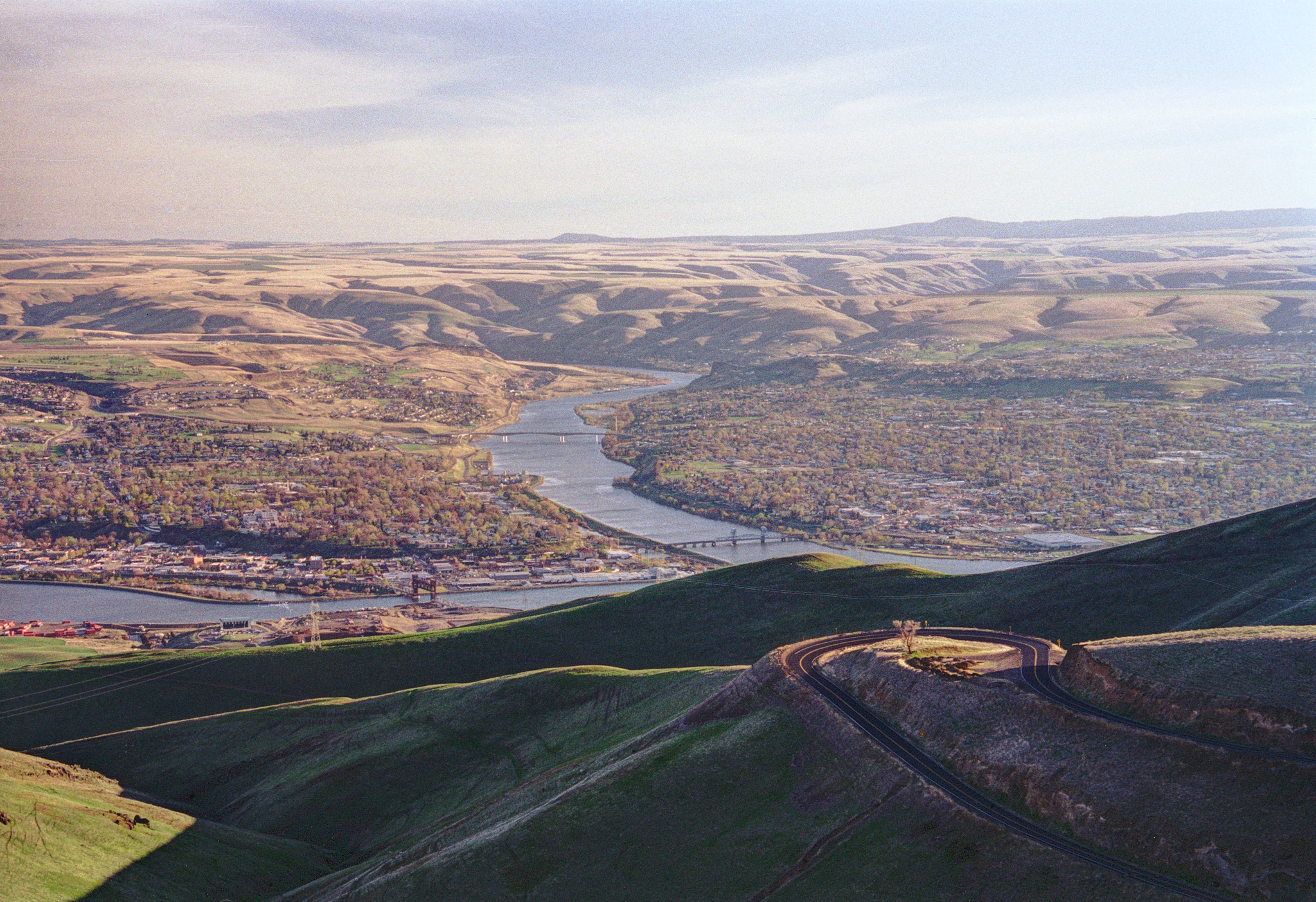
Lewiston (left) and Clarkston (right) anchor a metro area

As of the census of 2010, there were 31,894 people, 13,324 households, and 8,201 families residing in the city. The population density was 1,851.1 inhabitants per square mile (714.7/km^{2}). There were 14,057 housing units at an average density of 815.8 per square mile (315.0/km^{2}). The racial makeup of the city was 93.9% White, 0.3% African American, 1.7% Native American, 0.8% Asian, 0.1% Pacific Islander, 0.7% from other races, and 2.4% from two or more races. Hispanic or Latino of any race were 2.8% of the population.

There were 13,324 households, of which 27.8% had children under the age of 18 living with them, 47.0% were married couples living together, 10.3% had a female householder with no husband present, 4.3% had a male householder with no wife present, and 38.4% were non-families. 30.2% of all households were made up of individuals, and 12.8% had someone living alone who was 65 years of age or older. The average household size was 2.32 and the average family size was 2.87.

The median age in the city was 39.9 years. 21.5% of residents were under the age of 18; 10.8% were between the ages of 18 and 24; 23.8% were from 25 to 44; 25.6% were from 45 to 64; and 18.2% were 65 years of age or older. The gender makeup of the city was 49.2% male and 50.8% female.

=== Historical demographics ===
- 1864 territorial census: 359 (247 men, 58 women, 54 children)
- 1863 territorial census: 414 (306 men, 59 women, 49 children)

== Economy ==
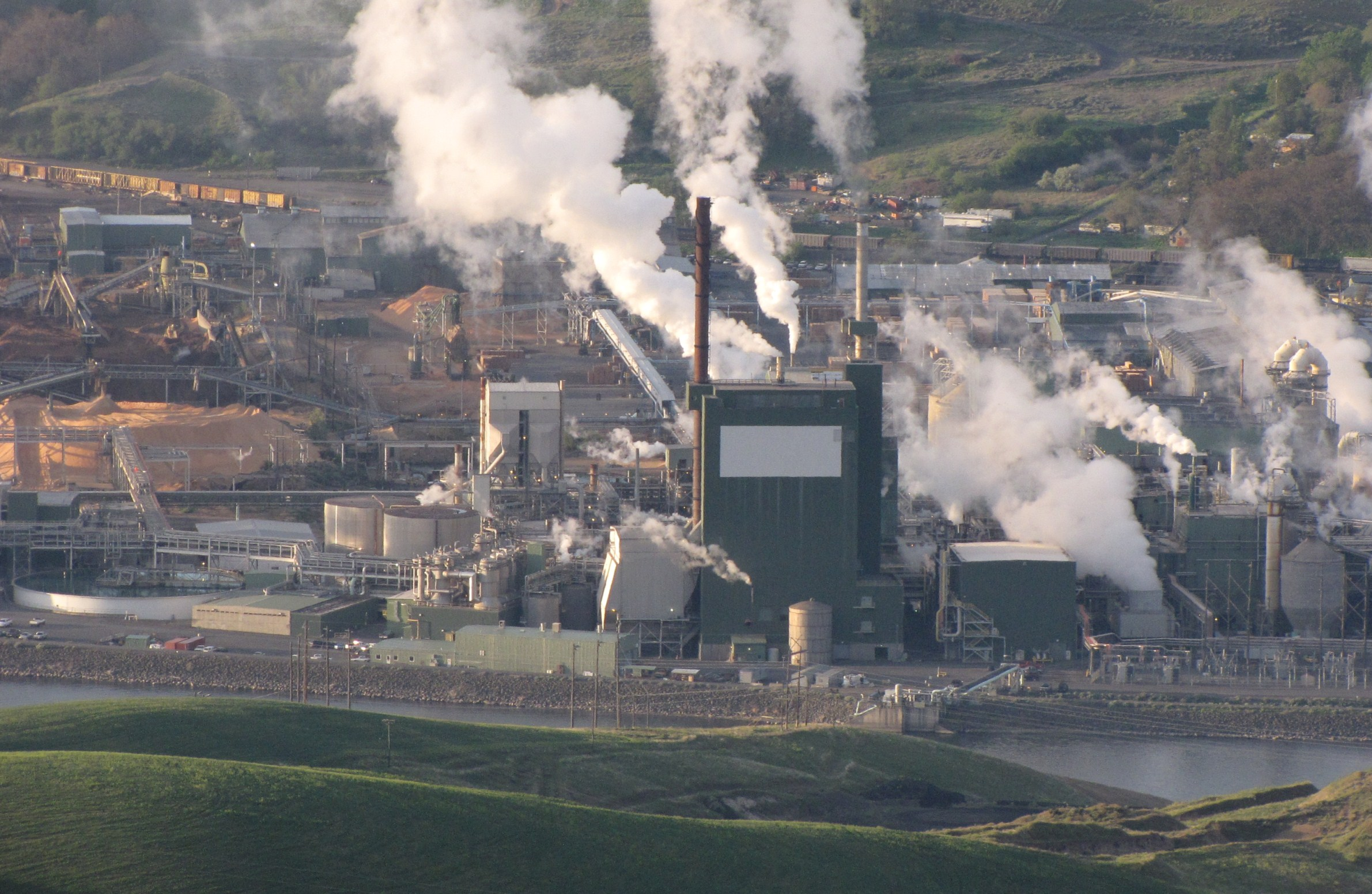
Clearwater Paper's large wood pulp mill, Lewiston, 2010

Lewiston's economy has historically been driven by agriculture and manufacturing activity. Lewiston's location at the confluence of the Snake River and Clearwater River made it a natural distribution point due to its seaport. The Port of Lewiston is Idaho's only seaport and is navigable for barges which transport grain, fuel, legumes, paper, lumber and other goods up and down the Columbia River and out to the Pacific Ocean. About ten percent of the United States' wheat exports transits through the port.

The first barge went to Portland; it was loaded with wheat and departed Lewiston on August 9, 1975.

Lewiston's main industries are agriculture, the paper and timber products from the mill owned and operated by the Clearwater Paper Corporation (until December 2008, a part of the Potlatch Corporation), and light manufacturing.

Paper product manufacturer Clearwater Paper is the largest employer in the manufacturing sector; its pulp and paper mill began operations in late 1950. Ammunition manufacturing maintains an important and growing presence in Lewiston. Ammunition makers CCI and Speer Bullet (both now brands of the Czechoslovak Group) are headquartered in Lewiston. Another ammunition company in Lewiston is Freedom Munitions LLC. Schweitzer Engineering Laboratories, based in Pullman, has a manufacturing facility in Lewiston.

As the metropolitan hub of the Lewis-Clark Valley, Lewiston is the primary regional transportation, retail, health care, wholesale and professional services, and entertainment center. In 2017, the Lewiston, ID–Clarkston, WA metropolitan area had a gross metropolitan product of $2.5 billion. With the presence of Lewis–Clark State College, it is also a center for education and workforce training.

Lewiston's economy is slowly diversifying, which has helped keep the economy stable. Lewiston serves as a recreation destination for the Hells Canyon National Recreation Area.

== Arts and culture ==
In springtime, Lewiston hosts the Dogwood Festival. This celebration is named for the abundant dogwood trees that are in fragrant bloom during the festival. During and shortly after the festival these pink blossoms blow through yards and streets like drifts of snow. The festival also hosts the "Show and Shine" classic car show alongside the other attractions.

During late summer, "Hot August Nights" takes place. This celebration includes concerts by popular 1950s to 1980s musicians, such as .38 Special, Eddie Money, and Loverboy. There's also a show and shine for collectible cars, followed by a night parade along Main Street. During the fall, a number of cottonwood trees release cotton-like clouds of seeds that blow through the air and streets, blanketing them with a snow-like cover.

The town has a large Christmas festival that includes a number of lighted displays in the downtown area. At the site of what was originally the Johann D. C. Thiessen mansion and ranch, now Locomotive Park, so named because of the retired locomotive Steam Engine 92 and Camas Prairie RR Caboose on display in the middle, large trees and pathways are decorated with lights from Thanksgiving to New Year's. These events are sponsored by the Chamber of Commerce, and the displays involved are typically quite impressive and often attract many visitors.

During the Christmas and Easter seasons, the Lewiston Jaycees have two large lighted displays on the Lewiston Hill (technically, the Washington side, and specifically, in Whitman County, above Clarkston in Washington state), visible from nearly everywhere in the valley. The display consists of long strings of ordinary light bulbs, arranged in the shape of a star (Christmas) and a cross (Easter). The same strings of lights are used in both displays, which, when lit, are left burning 24 hours a day through each season.

Every year, with cooperation from the city, Lewis-Clark State College hosts the Avista NAIA World Series for college baseball in May, and the Lewiston Round Up rodeo in September. The Lewiston Round Up is a member of the Big 4 or Big Money 4 (along with Pendleton Round-Up, Walla Walla Fair and Rodeo, and Ellensburg Rodeo) and a top 50 PRCA rodeo.

Lewiston had a popular Northwest League professional baseball franchise from 1952 through 1974. The Lewis-Clark Broncs were affiliated with various major league parent clubs, including the Philadelphia Phillies, Kansas City Athletics, St. Louis Cardinals, Baltimore Orioles, and Oakland Athletics (or A's). A roster check in 1967 showed that 40% of the players and coaches of the Kansas City Athletics had been in Lewiston at one time or another. Reggie Jackson was perhaps the most famous Lewiston Bronc of all-time; Mr. October played twelve games for Lewiston at age 20 in 1966. The Broncs' rosters included Rick Monday, manager John McNamara, Vearl ("Snag") Moore, Thorton ("Kip") Kipper, Antonio Perez, Ron Koepper, Delmer Owen, Dick Green, Bud Swan, Bert Campaneris, John Israel, Dave Duncan, Al Heist, and as a player, later coach-manager Robert ("Gabby") Williams. After years of financial losses, the team was shut down in Lewiston in January 1975, and resurfaced in June in southwestern Idaho as the Boise A's for two seasons.

== Education ==
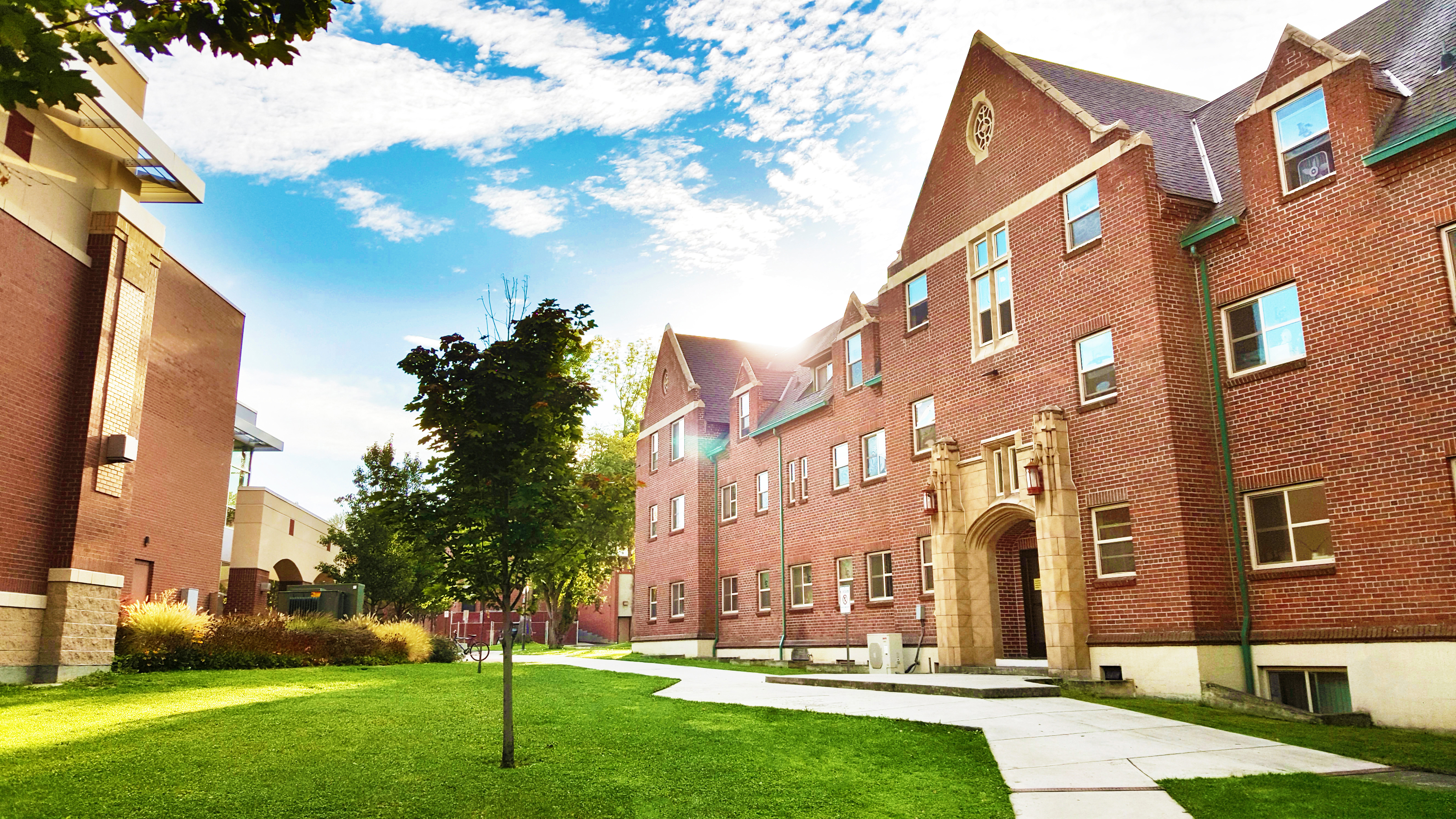
Talkington Hall at Lewis-Clark State College

Lewiston is home to Lewis-Clark State College and the Lewiston School District; the latter operates public secondary schools, which are Lewiston High School, Jenifer Middle School, and Sacajawea Middle School. The seven elementary schools are Whitman, Webster, Centennial, Orchards, Camelot, McGhee, and McSorley.

The Northwest Children's Home has a treatment facility in Lewiston.

The Lewiston School District is Independent School District #1.

Lewis-Clark State College is also the athletic home to the Warriors of the National Association of Intercollegiate Athletics (NAIA); LCSC's Harris Field ballpark hosts the NAIA World Series, of which the Warriors have won 19 national titles in baseball; the first sixteen were under head coach Ed Cheff.

== Media ==
The Lewiston Morning Tribune is a daily newspaper based in Lewiston that serves most of central Idaho and southeastern Washington. It was founded in 1892 and has been published daily since 1898. The city had been the home of the first newspaper in the state, The Golden Age, which began publication in 1862 and later folded. The local television station is KLEW-TV, a CBS affiliate which began broadcasting on December 7, 1955.

== Infrastructure ==
=== Transportation ===
Lewiston is bisected by U.S. Route 12, a major highway that travels west across Washington state and east towards Detroit, Michigan. An interchange with U.S. Route 95 in northeastern Lewiston provides access to northern Idaho and the state's interior. State Highway 128 travels along the north side of the Clearwater River towards industrial areas in Lewiston and Clarkston.

The city government operates a public transit system, named Lewiston Transit, with two routes that run on weekdays and Saturdays. It also provides paratransit service for eligible customers. The system is integrated with Clarkston's system, operated by the Asotin County PTBA, and shares hubs in Lewiston. The transit system was created in 2009 to replace Valley Transit, a separate agency that was dissolved and replaced by the city government.

Nonstop scheduled passenger airline service to Salt Lake City and Seattle–Tacoma is provided by Delta Connection from the Lewiston–Nez Perce County Airport (LWS). The airline signed an agreement with the city government in 2004 to provide a minimum of four daily flights. Lewiston–Nez Perce County Airport is primarily used for general aviation and also hosts limited cargo operations, air ambulances, and other services.

=== Marine access ===
Because of the system of locks and dams on the Columbia River such as the Lower Granite Dam, Lewiston is navigable by some ocean-going vessels and is the eastern terminus of Marine Highway M-84 of the United States Marine Highway Program which connects to the M-5 along the coast at Astoria, Oregon. At 465 miles (750 km) upstream of the Pacific Ocean (at the mouth of the Columbia River, adjacent to Astoria, Oregon), the Port of Lewiston has the distinction of being the most inland seaport east of the West Coast, and Idaho's only seaport.

Also, along much of the Snake River is a system of levees to protect against flooding; most are maintained by the U.S. Army Corps of Engineers.

== Notable people ==
- Austin Arnett – American mixed martial arts fighter
- Bryan Fuller – American screenwriter and television producer (born 1969)
- Julie Gibson – American actress and singer (1913–2019)
- Michael P. Mitchell – American politician (1925–2017)
- Jack O'Connor (writer) – American writer (1902–1978)
- Jake Scott (guard) – American gridiron football player (born 1981)
- Grace Vollmer – American painter (1884–1977)
